= Our Cultural Heart =

Urban regeneration project in Huddersfield, England

Our Cultural Heart is an urban regeneration project located in Huddersfield, West Yorkshire, England. A redevelopment of the Queensgate area of Huddersfield's town centre, the project is expected to cost £200 million. It is part of the Huddersfield Blueprint plans, a 10-year plan for Huddersfield's town centre.

Construction began in the summer of 2024. The first phase of the development, comprising Huddersfield Library Hub and Queensgate Square, opened in September 2026. Opening of the food hall in the Queensgate Market building has been delayed to 2027. The second phase of the development will involve the refurbishment of the former Huddersfield Library on Princess Alexandra Walk as the Huddersfield Museum and Art Gallery. The third phase will see the demolition of the Piazza Centre for the creation of a new urban park.
