= Haddersfield, Jamaica =

Town in Jamaica

Coordinates: 18°24′N 77°01′W

Haddersfield, also known as Huddersfield, is a small town located in the St. Mary parish of Jamaica. It is located at 18°24' N, 77°1' W, close to the small town of 'Retreat' and the mouth of the 'Rio Nuevo', some 10 kilometres east of Ocho Rios. It lies at an altitude of 164 metres above sea level.

== History ==
During the periods 1822–1832 the 33rd Regiment of Foot, recruited from West Yorkshire, was stationed in Jamaica. At the end of the tour 142 men chose to remain in Jamaica, having married and raised families, some of which may have originated from Huddersfield, thereby originating the name. Over 560 officers and men died and were buried in Jamaica during this period, from endemic diseases. On 18 June 1853 the regiment formally became known as "The 33rd (or Duke of Wellington's Regiment)." The regiment's second battalion was again posted to Jamaica (Newcastle Camp) from 18 March 1891 to 10 April 1893.
