= Huddersfield =

Town in West Yorkshire, England

Coordinates: 53°38′42″N 1°46′47″W

- Town
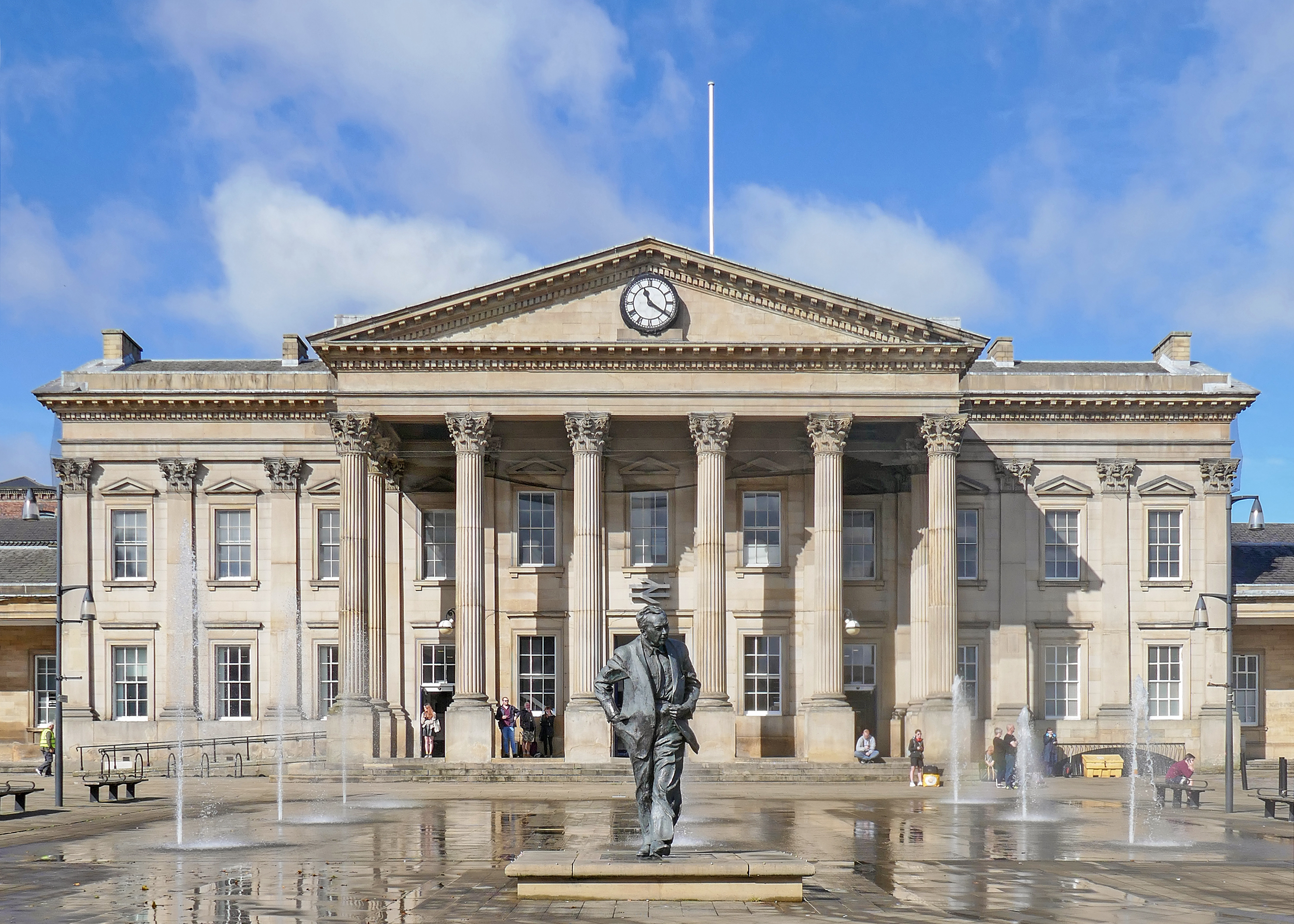
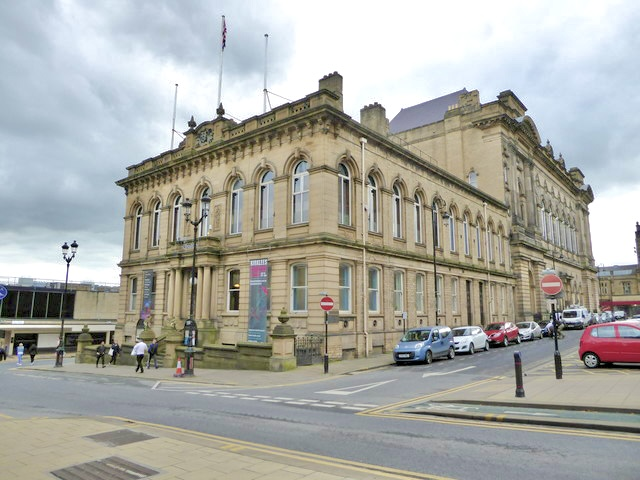
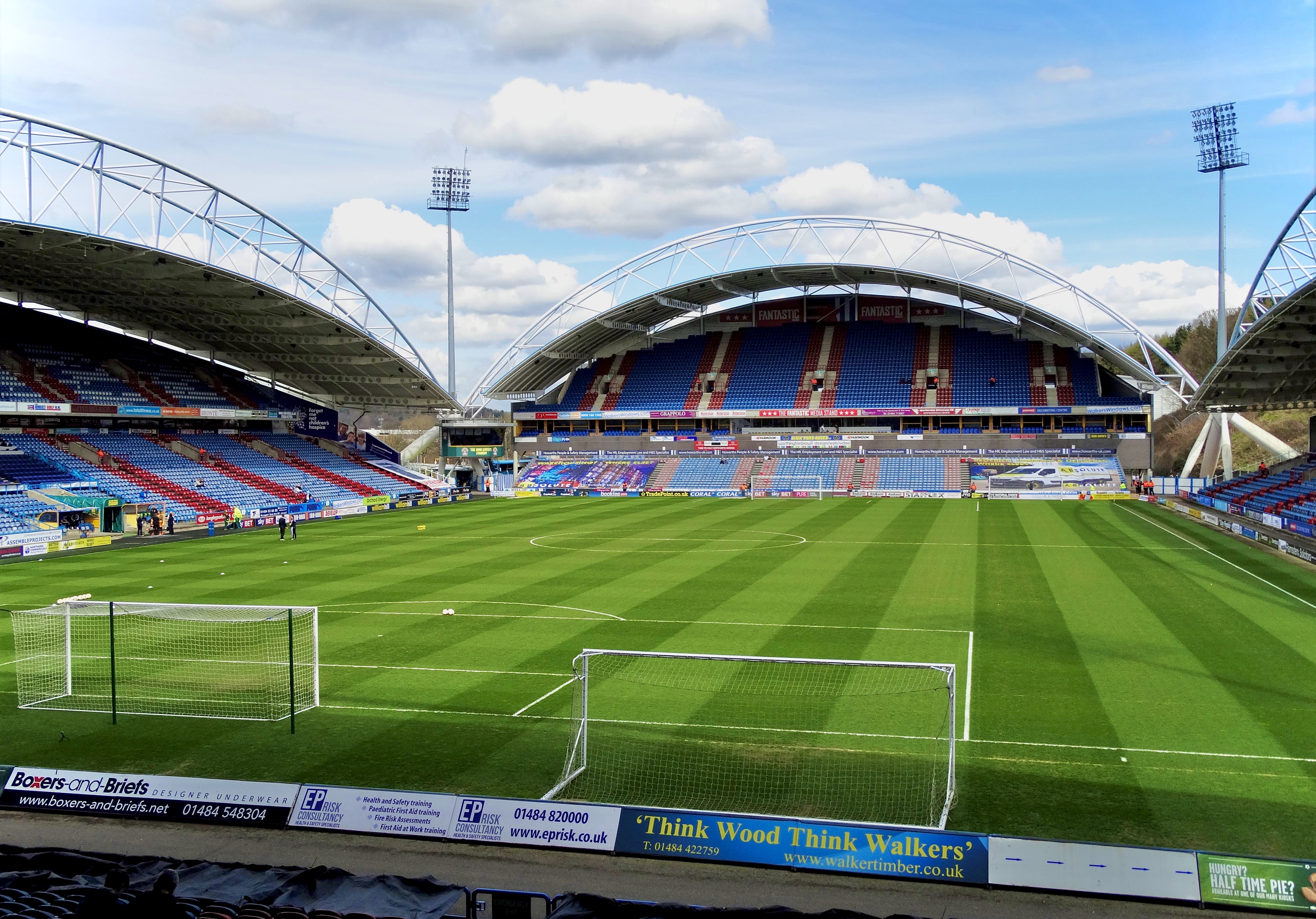
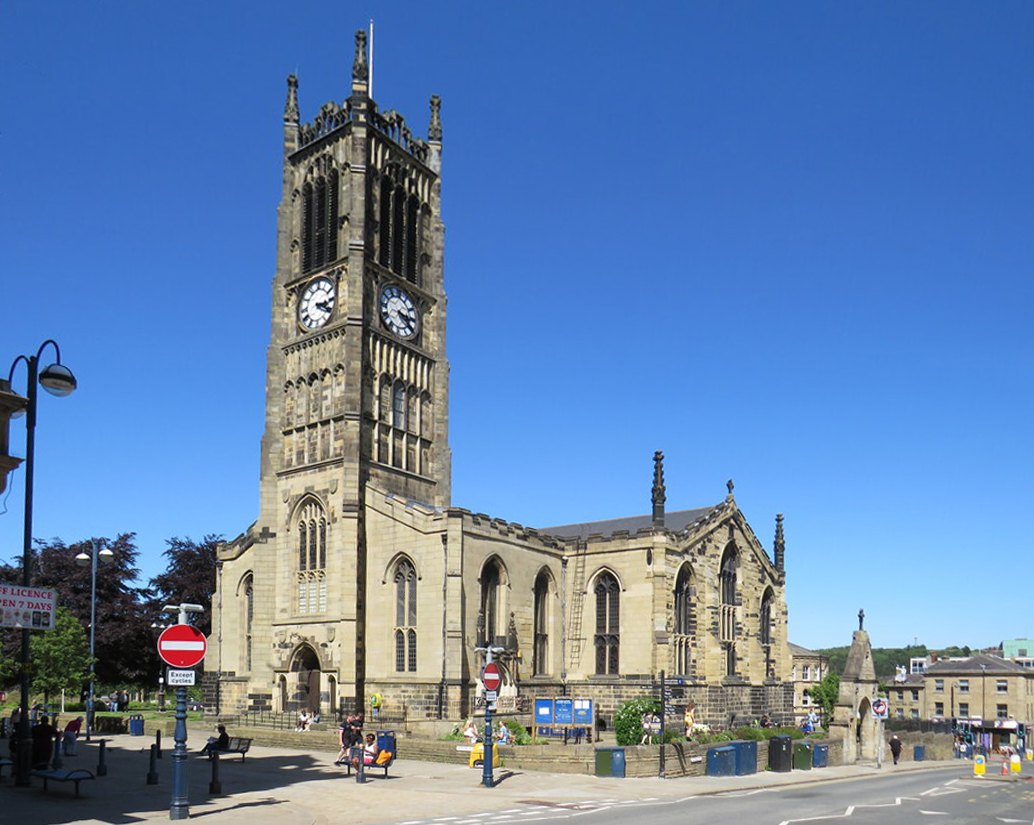
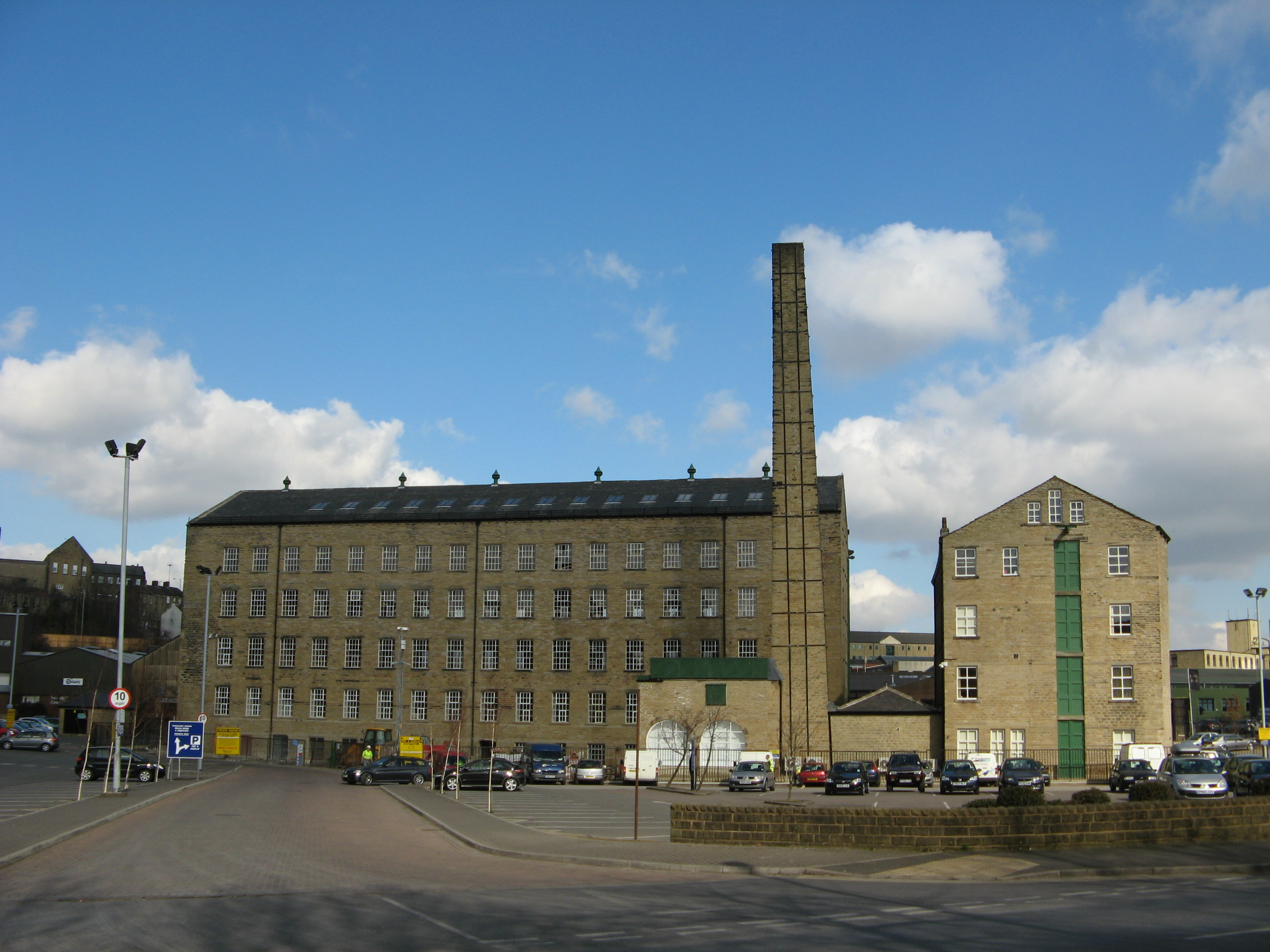
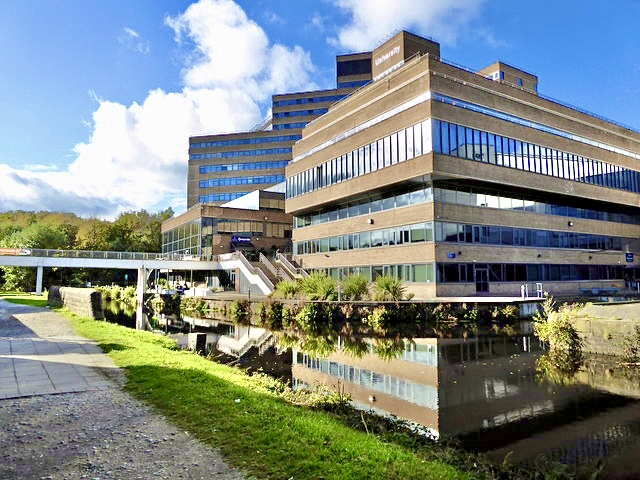
- Railway Station and statue of Harold Wilson Town Hall Accu Stadium St Peter's church Folly Hall Mills University of Huddersfield

- Location within West Yorkshire
- Population: 141,692 (2021 Census)
- OS grid reference: SE145165
- Metropolitan borough: Kirklees
- Metropolitan county: West Yorkshire
- Region: Yorkshire and the Humber
- Country: England
- Sovereign state: United Kingdom
- Areas of the town: List: Aspley; Birkby; Bradley; Cowlersley; Crosland Moor; Dalton; Deighton; Edgerton; Fartown; Fixby; Lindley; Lockwood; Longley; Longwood; Marsh; Milnsbridge; Moldgreen; Oakes; Paddock; Quarmby; Rawthorpe; Tamden; Thornton Lodge; Waterloo
- Post town: HUDDERSFIELD
- Postcode district: HD1-5, HD7-8
- Dialling code: 01484
- Police: West Yorkshire
- Fire: West Yorkshire
- Ambulance: Yorkshire
- UK Parliament: Huddersfield; Colne Valley

Huddersfield is a town in the Metropolitan Borough of Kirklees, West Yorkshire, England. It is the administrative centre and largest settlement in the Kirklees district, in the foothills of the Pennines. The River Holme's confluence into the similar-sized Colne is to the south of the town centre, which then flows into the Calder in the north-eastern outskirts of the town.

The rivers around the town provided soft water required for textile treatment in large weaving sheds; this made it a prominent mill town with an economic boom in the early part of the Victorian era Industrial Revolution. The town centre has much neoclassical Victorian architecture; an example is its railway station, a Grade I listed building described by John Betjeman as "the most splendid station façade in England." It won the Europa Nostra award for architecture.

The town hosts the University of Huddersfield and three colleges: Greenhead College, Kirklees College and Huddersfield New College. It is the birthplace of rugby league with the local team, Huddersfield Giants, playing in the Super League. It also has a professional football team, Huddersfield Town, that currently competes in the EFL League One, as well as two Rugby Union clubs: Huddersfield R.U.F.C. and Huddersfield YM RUFC. Notable people include Labour former British Prime Minister Harold Wilson and film star James Mason.

The town has been classed under Yorkshire, the West Riding of Yorkshire and West Yorkshire for statistics throughout its history. The town's population in 2021 was 141,692; it is in the West Yorkshire Built-up Area. The town is 14 miles (23 km) south-west of Leeds, 12 miles (19 km) west of Wakefield, 23 miles (37 km) north-west of Sheffield and 24 miles (39 km) north-east of Manchester.

== History ==
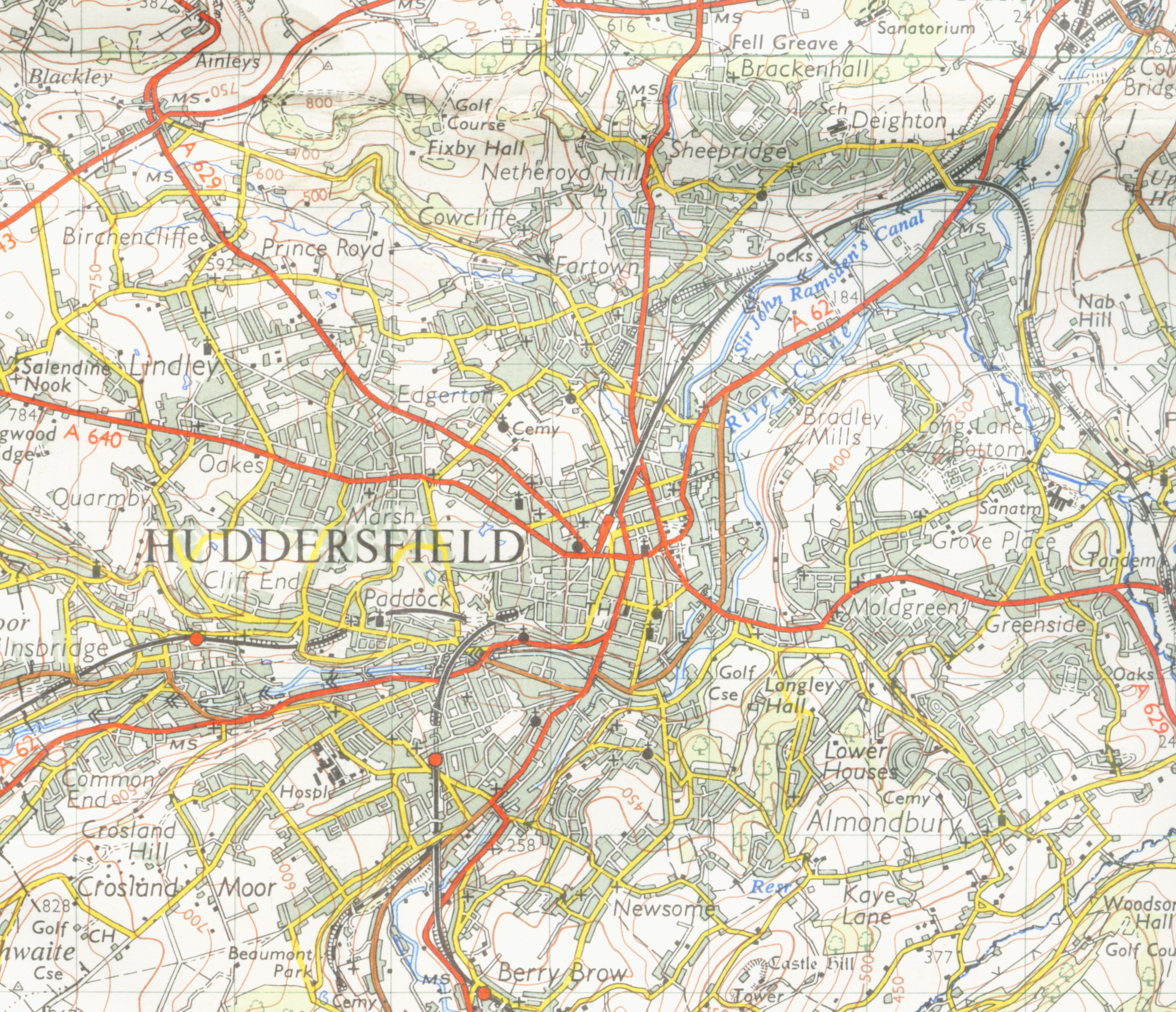
Map of Huddersfield from 1954

=== Iron age and Roman ===
Local settlement dates back over 4,000 years. Castle Hill, a major landmark, was the site of an Iron Age hill fort. The remains of a Roman fort were unearthed in the mid 18th century at Slack near Outlane, west of the town.

=== Toponymy ===
The earliest surviving record of the place name is in the Domesday Book of 1086, Oderesfelt. It appears as Hudresfeld in a Yorkshire charter from 1121 to 1127, and as Huderesfeld in subsidy rolls in 1297. The name meaning has not complicated with the shifts of English, remaining 'Hud(d)er's field'.

The modern name is pronounced without a word-initial /h/ in the local dialect, a trait independently shared by many Norman scribes' dialects of the Domesday Book era (see Old and modern French).

=== Market town and manor ===
Huddersfield has been a market town since Anglo-Saxon times. The market cross is on Market Place.

The manor of Huddersfield was owned by long lease by the de Lacy family until its 1322 takeback by the Crown. In 1599, William Ramsden bought it, and the Ramsden family continued to own the manor, which was known as the Ramsden Estate, until 1920. During their ownership they supported the development of the town. Sir John Ramsden, 3rd Baronet built the Huddersfield Cloth Hall in 1766 and his son the fourth baronet was responsible for Huddersfield Broad Canal in 1780. The Ramsdens endorsed the railway in the first wave of national railway building, in the 1840s.

=== Industrial Revolution ===
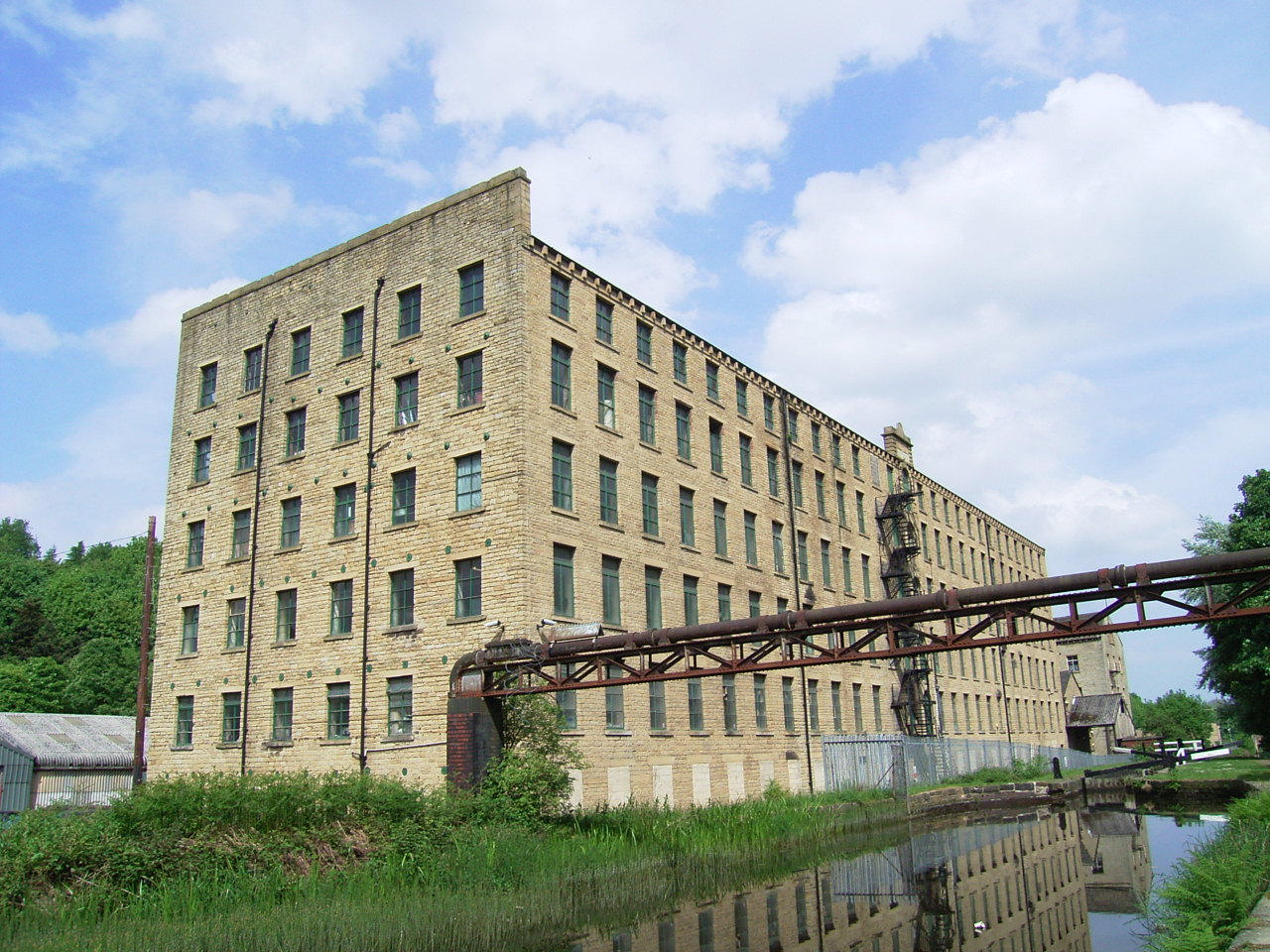
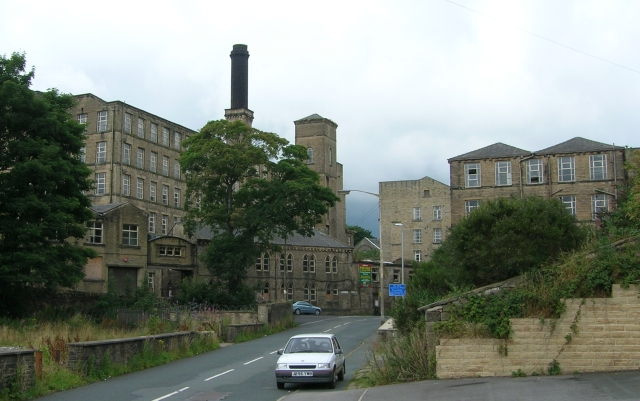
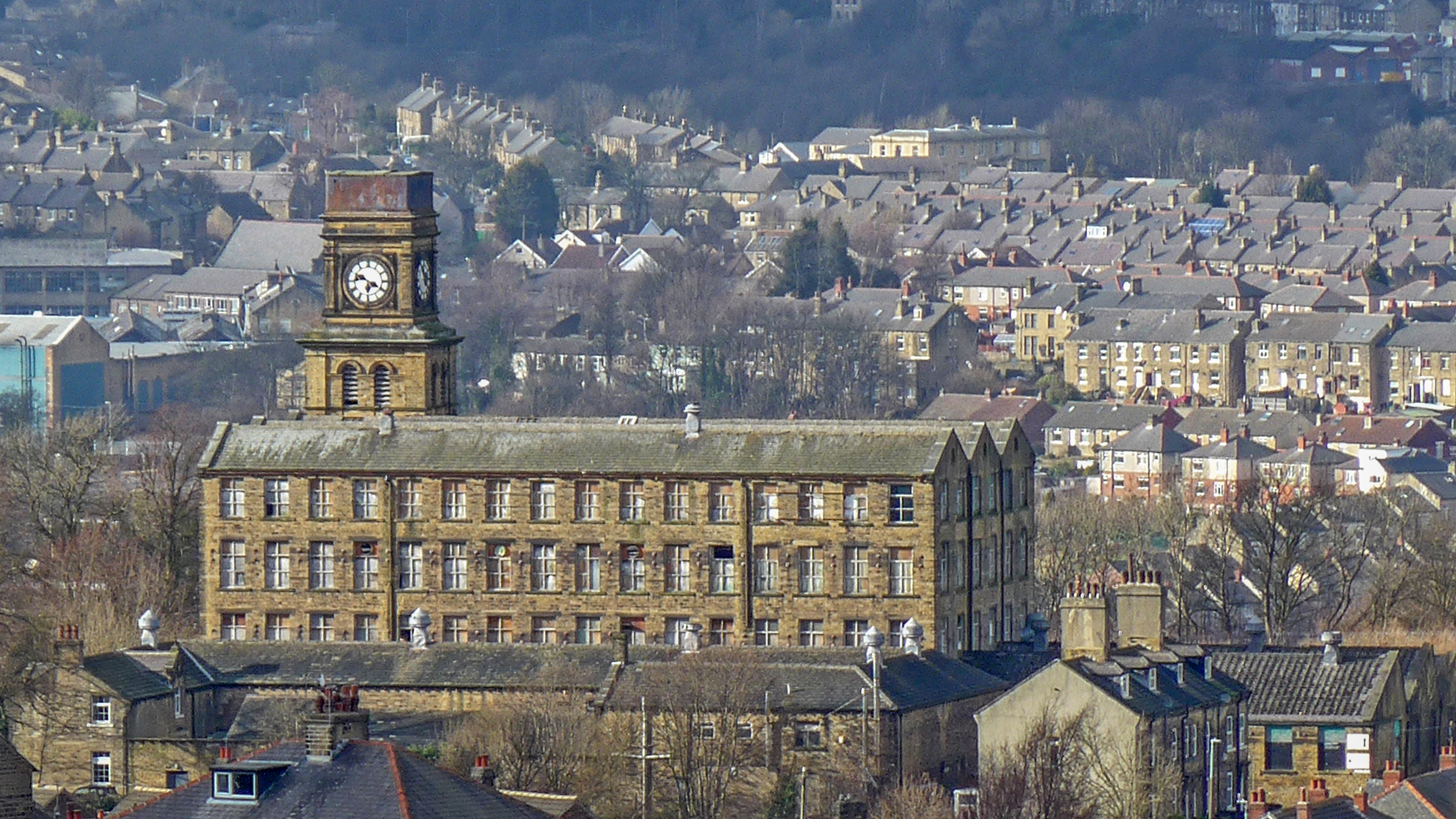
Britannia, Parkwood and Newsome textile mills

Huddersfield was a centre of civil unrest during the Industrial Revolution. Europe saw frequent wars during and after which, as to those most acutely affecting Britain, cloth trade slumped which could be compounded by local crops failure. Many local weavers faced starvation and losing their livelihood due to the new, mechanised weaving sheds. Luddites began destroying the mills, sheds and machinery at such times; one of the most notorious attacks was on Cartwright – a Huddersfield mill-owner who had a reputation for cruelty – and his Rawfolds Mill. Kirkpatrick Sale describes how an army platoon was stationed at Huddersfield to deal with these; at its peak, having about a thousand soldiers and ten thousand civilians. Luddites thus began to focus criminal damage on nearby towns and villages (less well-protected); their most damaging act was to destroy Foster's Mill at Horbury – a village about 10 miles (16 kilometres) east. The government campaign that crushed the movement was provoked by a murder that took place in Huddersfield. William Horsfall, a mill-owner and a passionate prosecutor of Luddites, was killed in 1812. Although the movement faded out, Parliament began to increase welfare provision for those out of work, and introduce regulations to improve conditions in the mills.

=== H. H. Asquith and H. Wilson ===
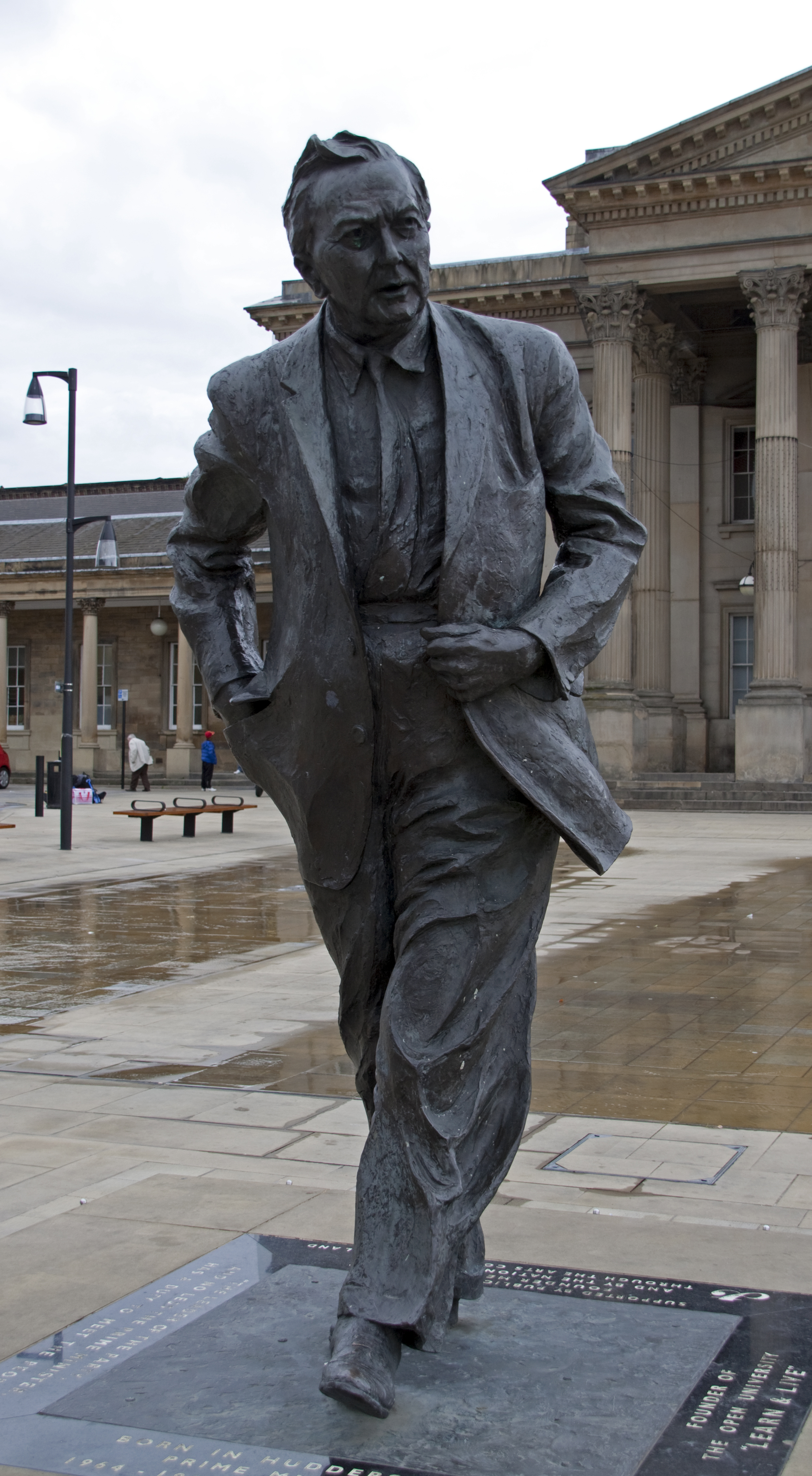
Statue of Sir Harold Wilson on St George's Square

Two Prime Ministers spent part of their childhood in Huddersfield: the Labour Prime Minister Harold Wilson, who was born locally and attended Royds Hall School, and the Liberal Prime Minister H. H. Asquith. Wilson is commemorated by a statue on the forecourt to the town's station.

=== Aristocratic interest discharged ===
In 1920, the corporation bought the Ramsden Estate from that family that had owned much of the town at least as to the reversion of long leases (a minor, overarching interest) since 1599, for £1.3 million. The town became "the town that bought itself." Most of the keynote central building freeholds belong to the local authority, as in a few towns in England such as Basingstoke.

=== LGBTQ+ rights movement ===
On 4 July 1981, Huddersfield held the first pride march outside of London in a move of solidarity with the Gemini Club and its harassment by the local police force and their referral to it as a "cesspit of filth". Upwards of 2,000 gay rights campaigners marched through the town from the football stadium up to Greenhead Park.

=== Urban regeneration ===
Work on the Our Cultural Heart project, a regeneration of Huddersfield town centre, began in 2020. The first phase of the development opened in 2026 with a new library hub and town square.

== Governance ==
Coat of arms of the former County Borough

Huddersfield was incorporated as a municipal borough in the ancient West Riding of Yorkshire in 1868. The borough comprised the thus sidelined civil parishes of Almondbury, Dalton, Huddersfield, Lindley-cum-Quarmby and Lockwood, later dissolved. When the West Riding County Council was formed in 1889, Huddersfield became a county borough, exempt from its control.

A more confined Huddersfield seat than the early 20th century scope has been represented by Labour since its creation in 1983 and is, by size of majority and length of tenure, a strongly-Labour leaning seat.

Kirklees was the first part of the country to have a Green or other environmentalist party councillor – Nicholas Harvey – he was instrumental in protesting against the intended closure of the Settle and Carlisle Railway line. The council has councillors of Labour, Conservative and Liberal Democrat parties; these retained the deposit, reaching more than 5% of the vote in the last general election for an MP who serves in the House of Commons.

Huddersfield expanded in 1937, assimilating parts of the Golcar, Linthwaite, and South Crosland urban districts. The county borough was abolished in 1974 and its former area was combined with that of other districts to form the Metropolitan Borough of Kirklees in West Yorkshire.

Council bids to gain support for city status were rejected by the people in a poll held by the Huddersfield Daily Examiner; the council did not apply for that status in the 2000 or 2002 competitions.

Huddersfield had a strong Liberal tradition up to the 1950s, reflected in several Liberal social clubs. The current Member of Parliament (MP) for the Huddersfield constituency is Harpreet Uppal of the Labour Party.

=== Demographic change ===
The town's population in 1961 had reached 130,652.

The United Kingdom Census 2001 stated that the population of the town's urban sub-area of the West Yorkshire Urban Area was 146,234 and that of the former extent of the county borough was 121,620. The wider South Kirklees had a population of 216,011.

== Geography ==
Huddersfield lies at the confluence of the shallow valley floors of the River Colne and the River Holme, south of the town centre. It is in the eastern foothills of the Pennines, which blend into the moorlands of the South Pennines to the west of the town.

=== Climate ===
As with all of West Yorkshire, a temperate oceanic climate exists, wetter than the low plains rain shadow proper towards East Yorkshire but drier than Cumbria. It is mild for the latitude – overnight frosts are quite frequent in winter yet daytime tends to exceed such temperatures due to onshore breezes from around Britain and as the Gulf Stream moderates temperatures. Summers are usually warm, punctuated by frequent rainy and hot spells. Winters are usually cool and damp, punctuated by frequent cold spells where snow is possible, especially on higher ground. According to the Köppen climate classification, Huddersfield is certified as Cfb.

Climate data for Huddersfield (1991–2020)
Month	Jan	Feb	Mar	Apr	May	Jun	Jul	Aug	Sep	Oct	Nov	Dec	Year
Mean daily maximum °C (°F)	6.3 (43.3)	6.8 (44.2)	9.2 (48.6)	12.2 (54.0)	15.8 (60.4)	18.7 (65.7)	20.3 (68.5)	19.3 (66.7)	17.4 (63.3)	13.1 (55.6)	9.0 (48.2)	6.5 (43.7)	12.9 (55.2)
Mean daily minimum °C (°F)	1.1 (34.0)	1.1 (34.0)	2.3 (36.1)	4.1 (39.4)	6.5 (43.7)	9.3 (48.7)	11.1 (52.0)	11.2 (52.2)	9.3 (48.7)	6.7 (44.1)	3.6 (38.5)	1.4 (34.5)	5.7 (42.3)
Average rainfall mm (inches)	105.3 (4.15)	82.4 (3.24)	75.0 (2.95)	70.8 (2.79)	61.7 (2.43)	81.7 (3.22)	76.2 (3.00)	83.2 (3.28)	77.0 (3.03)	100.8 (3.97)	107.7 (4.24)	119.4 (4.70)	1,041.2 (40.99)
Mean monthly sunshine hours	53.1	64.8	103.7	146.9	180.1	158.2	175.0	159.0	130.8	99.9	59.9	52.9	1,384.1
Source: Met Office

=== Divisions and suburbs ===
After boundary changes in 2004, Huddersfield now covers eight of the twenty-three electoral wards for Kirklees Council. Neighbouring wards in the Colne Valley, Holme Valley, and Kirkburton are often considered to be part of Huddersfield though they are predominantly semi-rural. The very centre of town forms the Newsome ward of councillors. Eight wards make up Huddersfield proper; these with populations, extent and constituent suburbs (mid-year 2005 estimates) are:

Ward	Population	Area (sq mi (km^{2}))	Population density (per sq mi (km^{−2}))	Places covered
Almondbury	16,610	3.863 (10.01)	4,299 (1,660)	Almondbury, Fenay Bridge, Lascelles Hall, Lepton
Ashbrow	17,470	4.366 (11.31)	4,001 (1,545)	Ashbrow, Brackenhall, Bradley, Deighton, Fixby, Netheroyd Hill, Sheepridge
Crosland Moor & Netherton	17,400	2.856 (7.40)	6,092 (2,352)	Beaumont Park, Crosland Moor, Lockwood, Longroyd Bridge, Netherton, South Crosland, Thornton Lodge
Dalton	17,520	4.975 (12.89)	3,521 (1,359)	Colne Bridge, Dalton, Kirkheaton, Moldgreen, Rawthorpe, Upper Heaton, Waterloo
Golcar	17,370	2.375 (6.15)	7,313 (2,824)	Cowlersley, Golcar, Longwood, Linthwaite (part of), Milnsbridge, Salendine Nook
Greenhead	17,620	1.706 (4.42)	10,328 (3,988)	Birkby, Edgerton, Fartown, Hillhouse, Marsh, Paddock
Lindley	17,020	2.737 (7.09)	6,218 (2,401)	Ainley Top, Birchencliffe, Lindley, Mount, Oakes
Newsome and Netherton	17,110	3.233 (8.37)	5,292 (2,043)	Armitage Bridge, Berry Brow, Hall Bower, Lowerhouses, Newsome, Primrose Hill, Springwood, Taylor Hill

=== Green belt ===
Huddersfield is within a green belt region that extends into the Kirklees borough and wider surrounding counties. It is in place to reduce urban sprawl, prevent the towns in the West Yorkshire Urban Area conurbation from further convergence, protect the identity of outlying communities, encourage brownfield reuse, and preserve nearby countryside. This is achieved by restricting inappropriate development within the designated areas, and imposing stricter conditions on permitted building.

The green belt surrounds the Huddersfield built-up area, a much-wooded buffer zone. Larger outlying communities, such as Upper Hopton, Grange Moor, Highburton, Farnley Tyas, Netherton, Honley, Outlane, Slaithwaite and Wellhouse, are exempt from this. Nearby smaller villages, hamlets and rural areas such as Thurgory, Gawthorpe Green, Bog Green, Upper Heaton, Wilberlee, South Crosland, Rushfield Bridge and Bank End see their unbuilt land included in the designation. Much semi-rural land on the fringes forms the rest. It was chiefly defined in the 1960s, and across Kirklees covers about 70%, i.e. 23,050 hectares (57,000 acres) (2017, excluding the Peak District National Park).

A subsidiary aim is to encourage play, sport and leisure, through woodland, moor, streams, green meadows, fields, small bogs. Features are:

- Castle Hill with Victoria Tower
- Coal Pit Scrog and Hall Wood in Lepton
- Blackmoorfoot Reservoir
- Longwood reservoir
- Huddersfield Narrow Canal and the Colne
- The Holme (river and paths)
- Storthes Hall
- Kirkheaton cricket ground
- Beaumont Park: The town's first public park laid out in the early 1880s on land donated by H. F. Beaumont of Whitley Beaumont, a local landowner. The park is listed at Grade II on the Register of Historic Parks and Gardens of Special Historic Interest in England.

West of Marsden, Meltham and Holmbridge, it borders the north limb of the Peak District National Park.

== Demography ==
=== Ethnicity ===
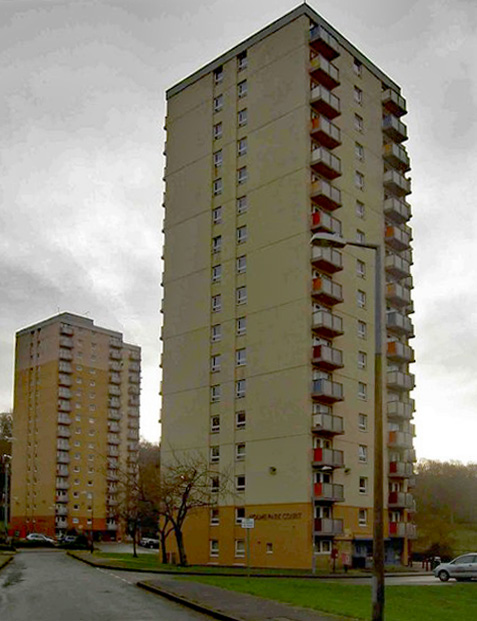
Apartment Block housing in Berry Brow

In 1961, Huddersfield was 2.2% non-White, with it being 1.5% (1,964) Black and 0.7% (874) Asian. As of 2021, the town of Huddersfield's population was enumerated at 141,692; its ethnic makeup was 66% White, 20.4% Asian, 5.6% Black, 5.2% Mixed, 2% Other and 1% Arab.

=== Religion ===
The town has many churches, mosques, temples and synagogues. These include Christian denominations: the Church of England, Baptists, Presbyterians and Congregationalists (sometimes as their main fusion the United Reformed Church), Methodism, Quakers, and the Roman Catholic Church. Buddhism, Hinduism, Islam, the Jehovah's Witnesses, Mormonism and Sikhism all have congregational buildings.

The town's religious makeup was 39% Christian, 37.4% No Religion, 20.4% Muslim, and has small Hindu, Sikh, Buddhist and Jewish communities.

== Economy ==
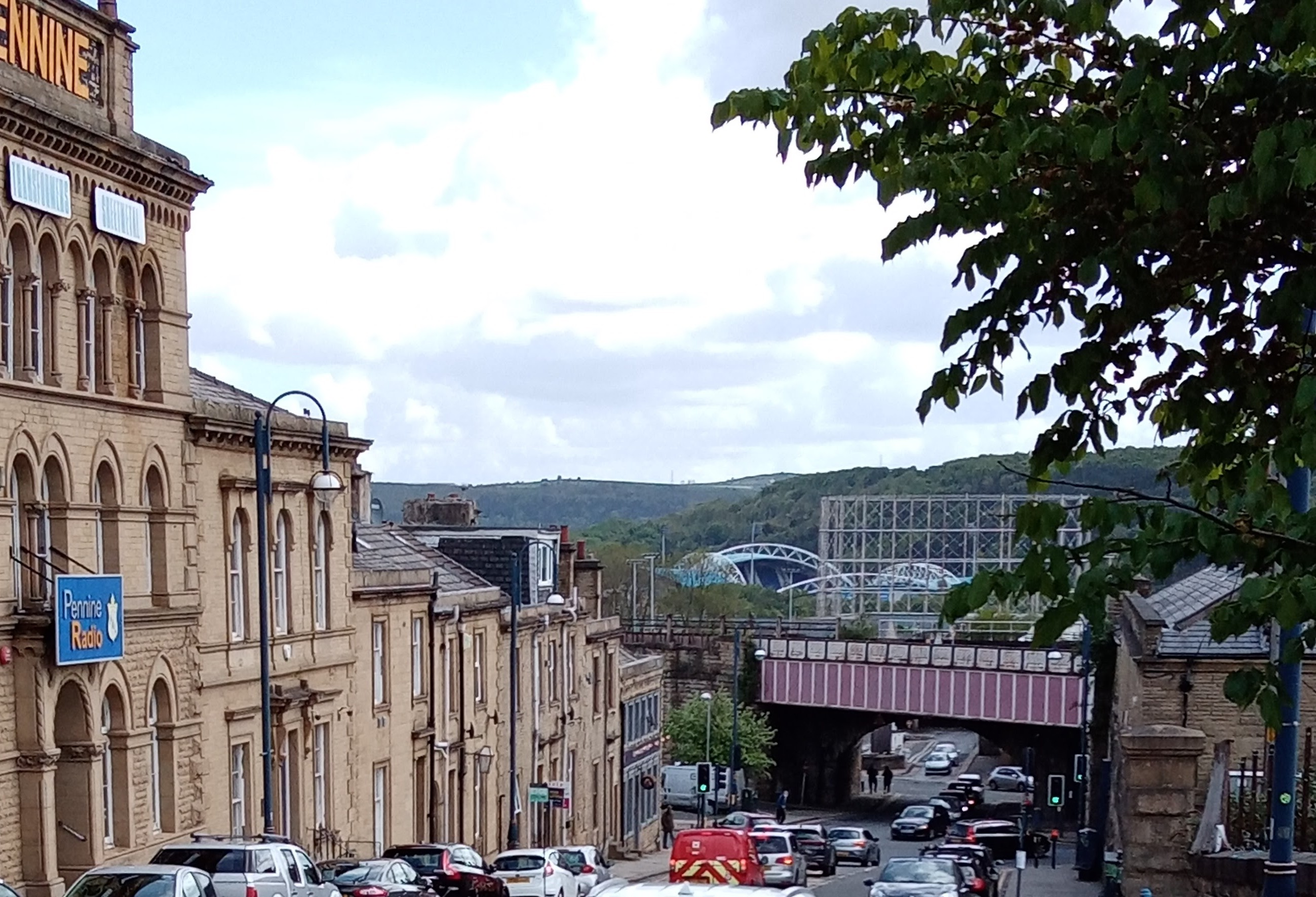
The bridge carrying the railway entering the station, the stadium, gas holder and Kilner bank viewed from the top of Fitzwilliam Street

=== Industry ===
Huddersfield is a manufacturing town, despite the university being the largest employer. Historically the town produced woollen textiles. This area of business, along with the chemical and engineering industries that emerged to support the manufacture of textiles, was the basis of the town's nineteenth and early twentieth century prosperity. The number of people who work in textiles has declined greatly, but the surviving companies produce large quantities of woollen products with little labour.

The town is home to textile, chemical and engineering companies, including Brook Motors Ltd founded by Ernest Brook in 1904. Against conventional wisdom, he started making alternating current electric motors, and he did this in one room with two assistants and starting capital of just £300. On its 50th anniversary in 1954, it employed more than 2,000 people and, with Ernest's sons Frank and Jack in charge, was the largest exclusive producer of AC motors in the world, with had a turnover of £4,500,000. That same year Brook Motors Ltd operated 10 factories in Huddersfield, its biggest being Empress Works on St Thomas's Road, and opened one at Barugh Green, Barnsley.

Other local manufacturers are Cummins Turbo Technologies, founded in 1952 as Holset by Messrs. Holmes and Croset. (turbochargers), David Brown Gear systems (industrial gearing), Huddersfield Fine Worsteds (textiles), Taylor & Lodge (textiles), C & J Antich (textiles), Syngenta AG (agro-chemicals), Pennine Radio Limited (electronics transformers and sheet metalworking) and a large number of niche manufacturers, such as Dual Seal Glass (maker of spandrel glass panels) and Ellis Furniture (producer of kitchen and bathroom furniture). Huddersfield is home to Andrew Jones Pies, a regional award-winning pie-maker, and Mamas and Papas, a manufacturer and retailer of prams, pushchairs and related items and specialist pneumatics supplier Shelley Automation Ltd.

=== Health ===
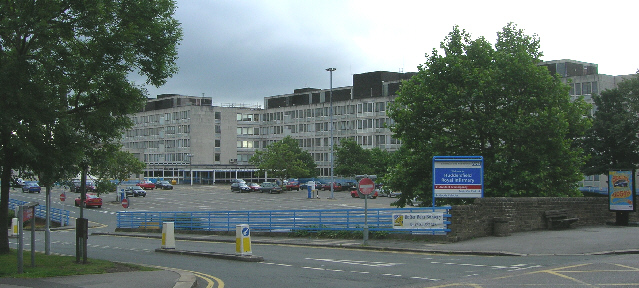
Huddersfield Royal Infirmary

Huddersfield Royal Infirmary is in Lindley. Medical services are split between there and the Calderdale Royal Hospital at Salterhebble, near Halifax. Kirkwood Hospice provides care for the terminally ill, and is dependent on donations and charitable gifts. Princess Royal Hospital provided maternity facilities until the risks of not being able to get an ambulance to A&E in the event of complications were judged to outweigh the benefits of specialist service provision. It now functions as a day clinic, family planning consultation centre and GUM Clinic.

A decision to move most maternity services provided by the Calderdale & Huddersfield NHS Foundation Trust to the Calderdale Royal Hospital ended the provision in 2007, despite strong local opposition. The campaign was led by Save Huddersfield NHS which elected a councillor, Dr Jackie Grunsell in the Crosland Moor ward. In January 2016 plans were announced to close the A&E department of Huddersfield Royal Infirmary and have all emergency cases go to Calderdale Royal instead. This sparked uproar in local communities as it would mean journeys from some areas of over 40 minutes to and from the hospital assuming that the main road into Halifax was not congested, as it frequently is.

The former St. Luke's Hospital in Crosland Moor provided mostly geriatric and psychiatric care. It closed in 2011 and the land was sold to a developer; it is now home to Fitzwilliam Grange, a housing estate.

Platform 1 is a charity established in 2018; it provides a space and advice for men struggling with mental health.

=== Entertainment ===
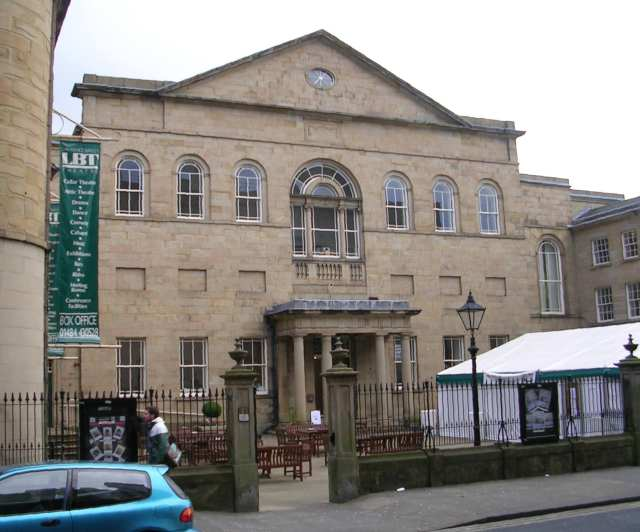
Lawrence Batley Theatre

The Lawrence Batley Theatre, opened in 1994, in what was once the largest Wesleyan Chapel in the world. It presents dance, drama, comedy, music and exhibitions and is the base for Full Body and The Voice, a company concerned with the integration of disabled people into mainstream theatre.

The Accu Stadium (formerly the John Smith's Stadium, Galpharm Stadium and Alfred McAlpine Stadium), is a multi-use sports stadium with a gym, swimming pool, spa and offers sporting classes. It is home to Huddersfield Giants and Huddersfield Town. Adjacent the stadium is an Odeon cinema (formerly UCI).

There are many pubs, restaurants and night clubs. The oldest pub is The Parish, (Note: formerly the Fleece Inn) trading since 1720.

=== Shopping ===
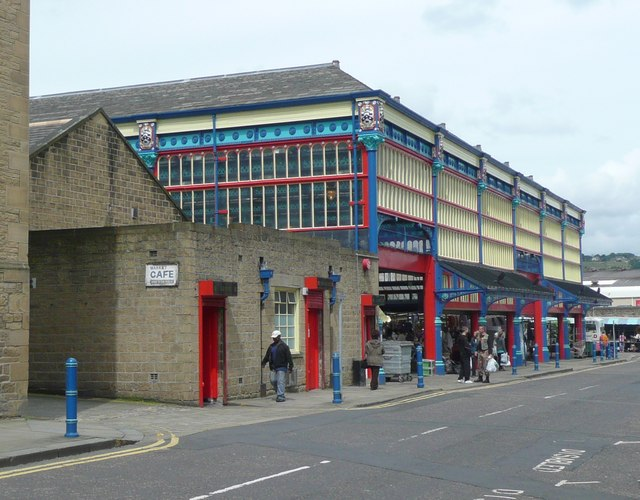
Lord Street Indoor Market

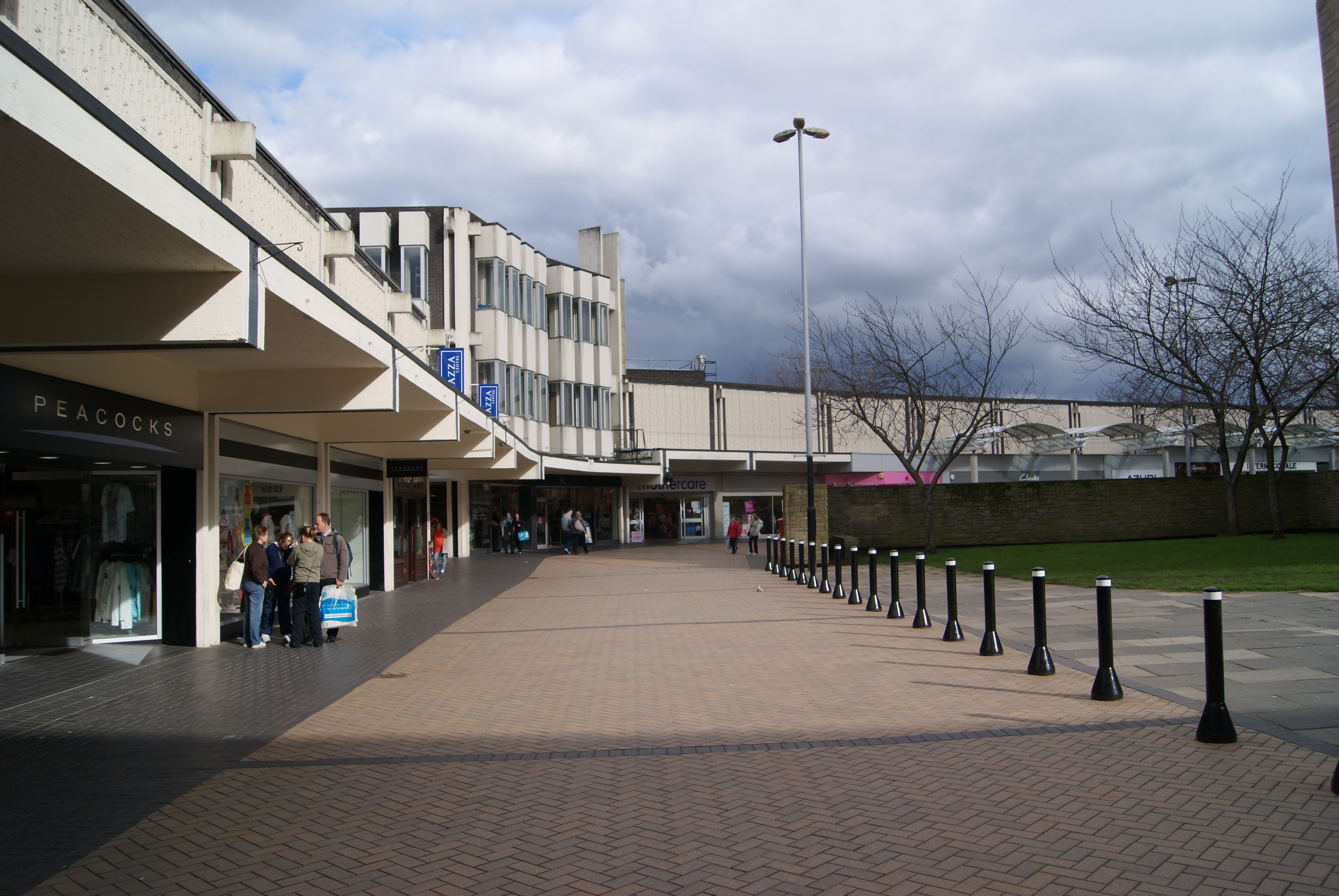
The Piazza Centre

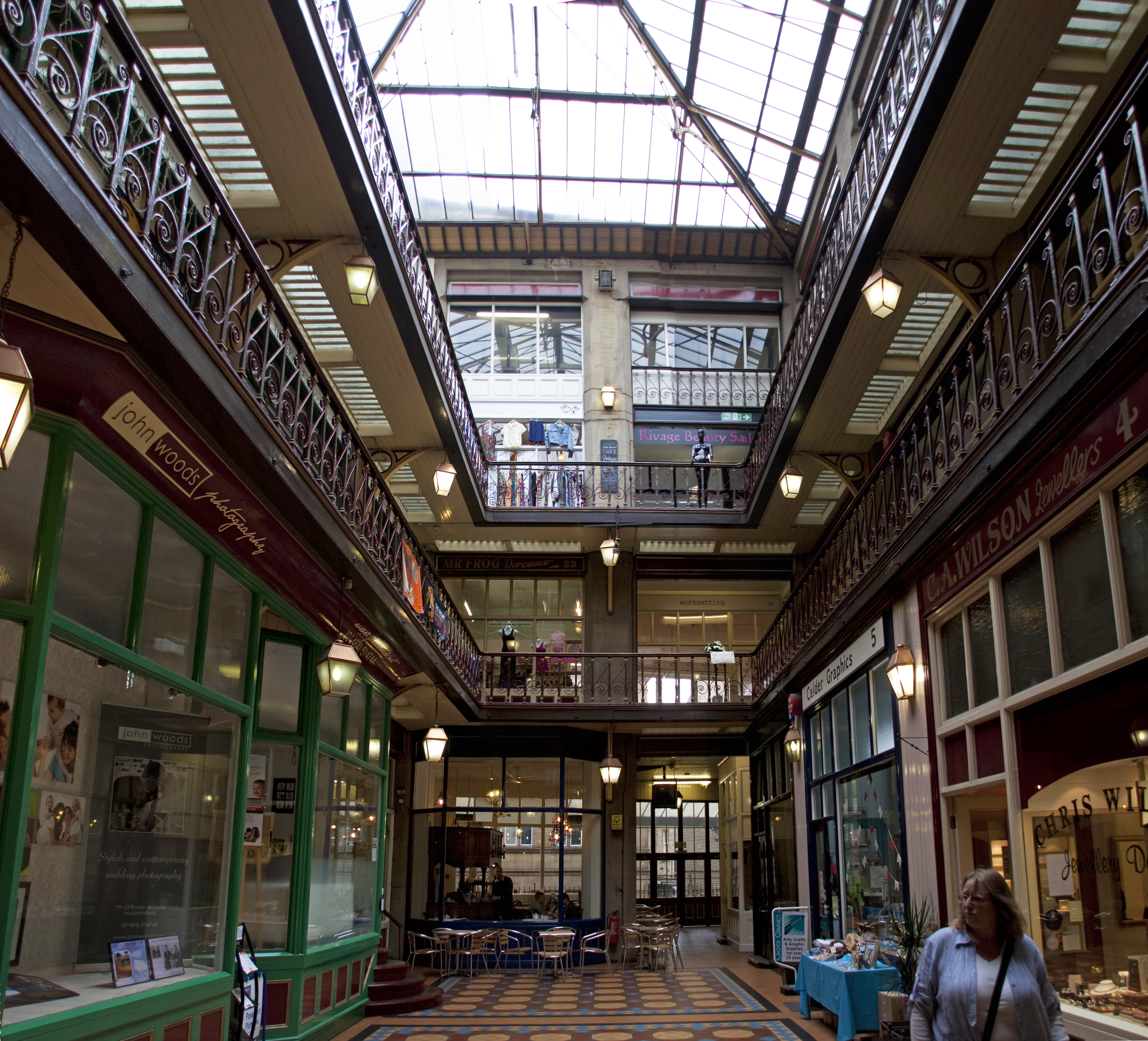
Byram Arcade

Huddersfield has a large and diverse retail shopping area, enclosed within the town's ring road, compared with other towns of its size. There are three shopping areas: Kingsgate, The Packhorse Precinct and The Piazza Centre. The Piazza offers an outdoor shopping mall near the public library, with a grassed area, used for relaxation and events throughout the year such as entertainment, international markets and iceskating in winter. Through the adjacent Market Arcade is a covered market hall, which has listed building status, due in part to its distinctive roof formed by hyperbolic paraboloids. It is adjacent to the town hall and public library. An open market trades next to Tesco, on the other side of the town centre.

The town centre is home to several national high street retailers and chain stores. There are also a variety of small specialist and independent shops, many in the three-storey Victorian shopping arcade, Byram Arcade, on street, Westgate.

However, over the last decade, many shops have closed down causing a general decline of the town centre. Most notability, the closure of British Home Stores (BHS) in 2016 left a large shopping unit empty in The Piazza Centre. In 2019, Marks & Spencer announced 17 closures within the UK, including the Huddersfield store.

== Community and culture ==
=== Music ===
Huddersfield Choral Society founded in 1836, claims to be the UK's leading choral society. Its history was chronicled in the book 'And The Glory', written to commemorate the society's 150th anniversary in 1986 – its title derived from a chorus in Handel's landmark Oratorio Messiah.

The annual Huddersfield Contemporary Music Festival is held in the town, which is also home to the Huddersfield Philharmonic Orchestra and the Huddersfield Singers.

On Christmas Day 1977, the Sex Pistols played their last two British shows, a matinee for the children of striking firefighters, at Ivanhoe's nightclub; this was before embarking on an ill-fated US tour which saw the group's acrimonious collapse. An independent record label, Chocolate Fireguard Records, was founded in 2000 by singer Pat Fulgoni who developed a three-stage community music event, Timeless Festival, in Ravensknowle Park, featuring a range of electronica, hip hop and rock music.

There are other annual music festivals held in the town and surrounding area; examples include the Marsden Jazz Festival, Mrs Sunderland, Electric Spring, Janet Beaumont, the Holmfirth Festivals, and the Haydn Wood (Linthwaite). The Haydn Wood (for under 21s) and Mrs Sunderland festival focus on musical and oratorial performance. The Electric Spring festival is an exploration of electronic and experimental music, featuring the 50-channel, 64-loudspeaker Huddersfield Immersive Sound System (HISS). The Mrs Sunderland Music festival is the second oldest in the United Kingdom, started in 1889, lasting for nine days each year. Free music concerts have been put on for the town, including bands such as the Ordinary Boys, the Script and Elliott Minor. There are many local choirs, youth and adult, an example of the latter being the Honley Male Voice Choir.

Home-grown musical talent of all kinds is complemented by the student intake to the University of Huddersfield's music department. "The Sheriff of Huddersfield" is a song by heavy metal band Iron Maiden on the B-side of their 1986 single "Wasted Years", written about their co-manager Rod Smallwood, leaving his home town of Huddersfield and struggling to settle into life in Los Angeles. Huddersfield is home to thrash metal band Evile, dance rock band Kava Kava, the birthplace of the synthpop musician Billy Currie (of Ultravox and Visage), and the hard rock bassist John McCoy who played with Neo and Gillan.

=== Art ===
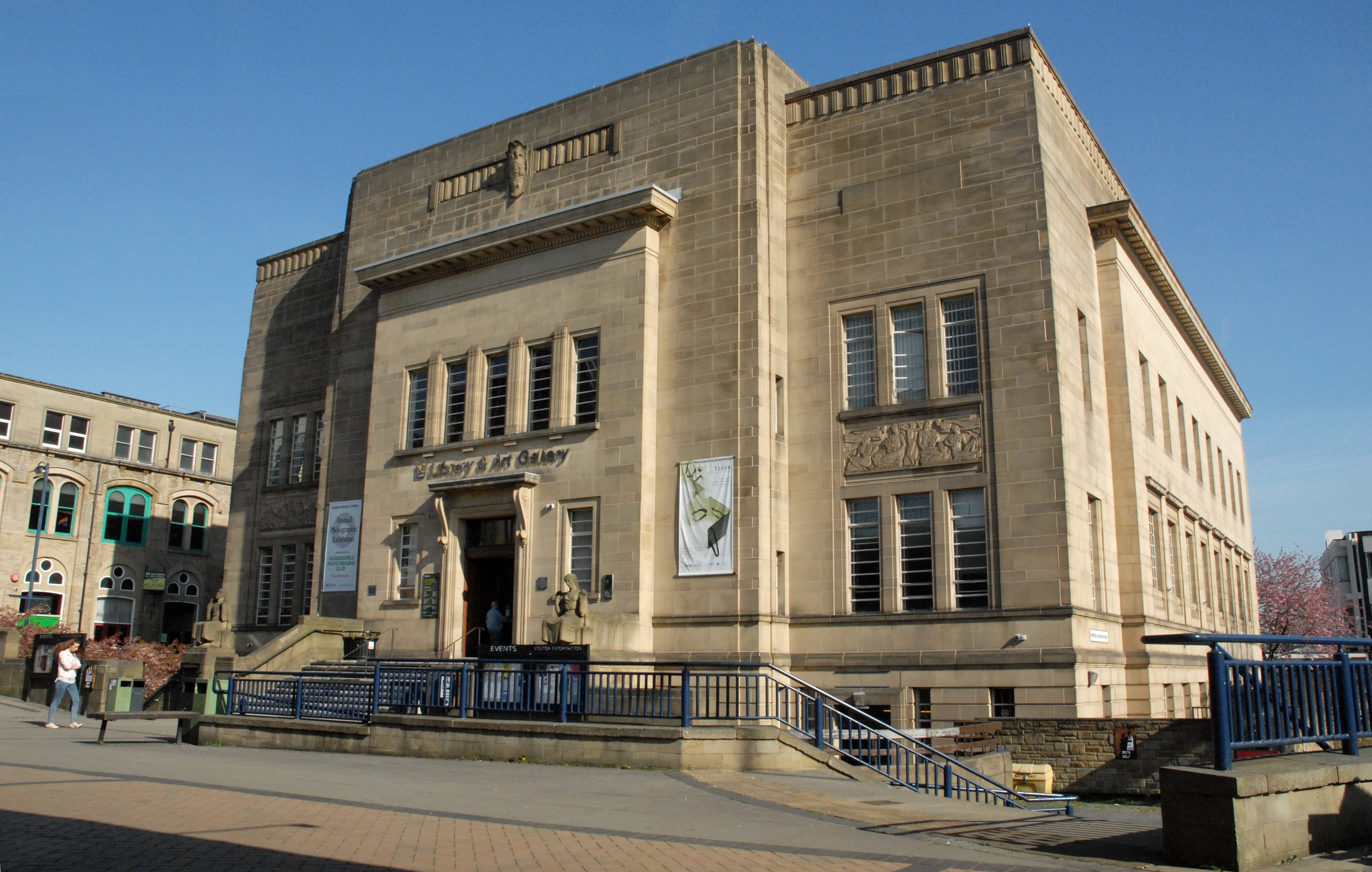
Huddersfield Library & Art Gallery

Huddersfield Art Gallery occupies the top floor of the library at Princess Alexandra Walk. It has an extensive collection, featuring Francis Bacon, L.S. Lowry and Henry Moore, as well as significant regional artists. It has other halls for its temporary exhibitions for established and emerging artists.

Ian Berry was born in Netherton, Huddersfield and was educated in the town and went to Greenhead College and is internationally renowned for his art using only denim jeans and was named as one of the top 30 artists under 30 in the world in 2013. In 1996, aged 11, he won the Huddersfield Daily Examiner 125th Birthday competition that saw his design printed on to mugs, tea towels and posters.

=== Festivals ===
Huddersfield Festival of Light takes place annually in December, usually in the town centre adjacent to the railway station. Each year there is a performance by a theatre company. The finale is a firework display. The 2007 show was performed by French company Plasticiens Volants, which used large inflatable sea creatures in a parade through the streets as they told the story of 'Pearl'. The 2005 and 2008 performances were by the Valencian artists Xarxa Teatre. The 2010 festival featured Belgian company Company Tol and their suspension act – Corazon de Angeles (Angels' Heart) and ended on 5 December with fireworks in St George's Square.

Huddersfield has a long-established Saint Patrick's Day Parade on c. 17 March.

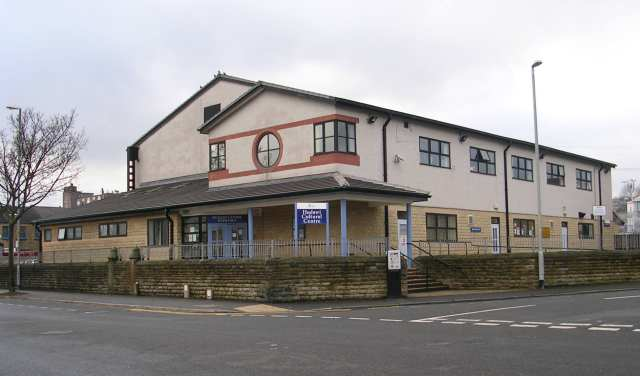
Hudawi Cultural Centre

Huddersfield Caribbean Carnival, in mid-July, begins with a procession from the Hudawi Cultural Centre in Hillhouse, through the town centre to Greenhead Park where troupes display their costumes on stage. Caribbean food, fairground rides and various stalls and attractions are available. A "young blud" stage presents Hip Hop, UK garage, RnB and bassline.

The Huddersfield Literature Festival is held annually in the town; it features author events, creative writing classes and poetry nights, and sometimes creative writing competitions.

Since 2016, the town has a growing one-day Onwards Festival for music and arts. It celebrates local music, art, food and drink. Its spirit is organisation like a pub crawl, moving between venues to experience different tastes of culture. Its first year saw 10 live music acts, an exhibition and some live art performances, with payment for the later events.

== Landmarks and architecture ==
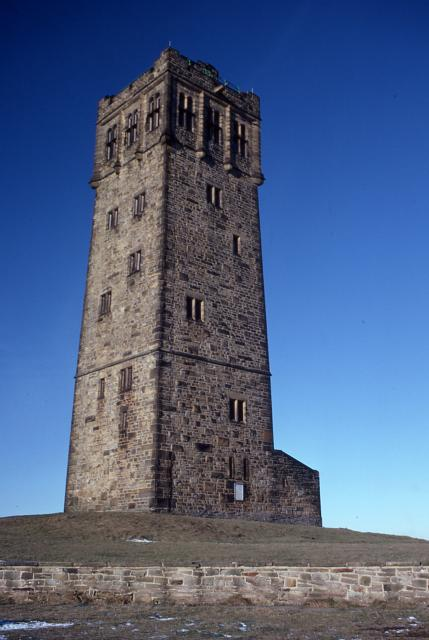
The Victoria Tower on Castle Hill

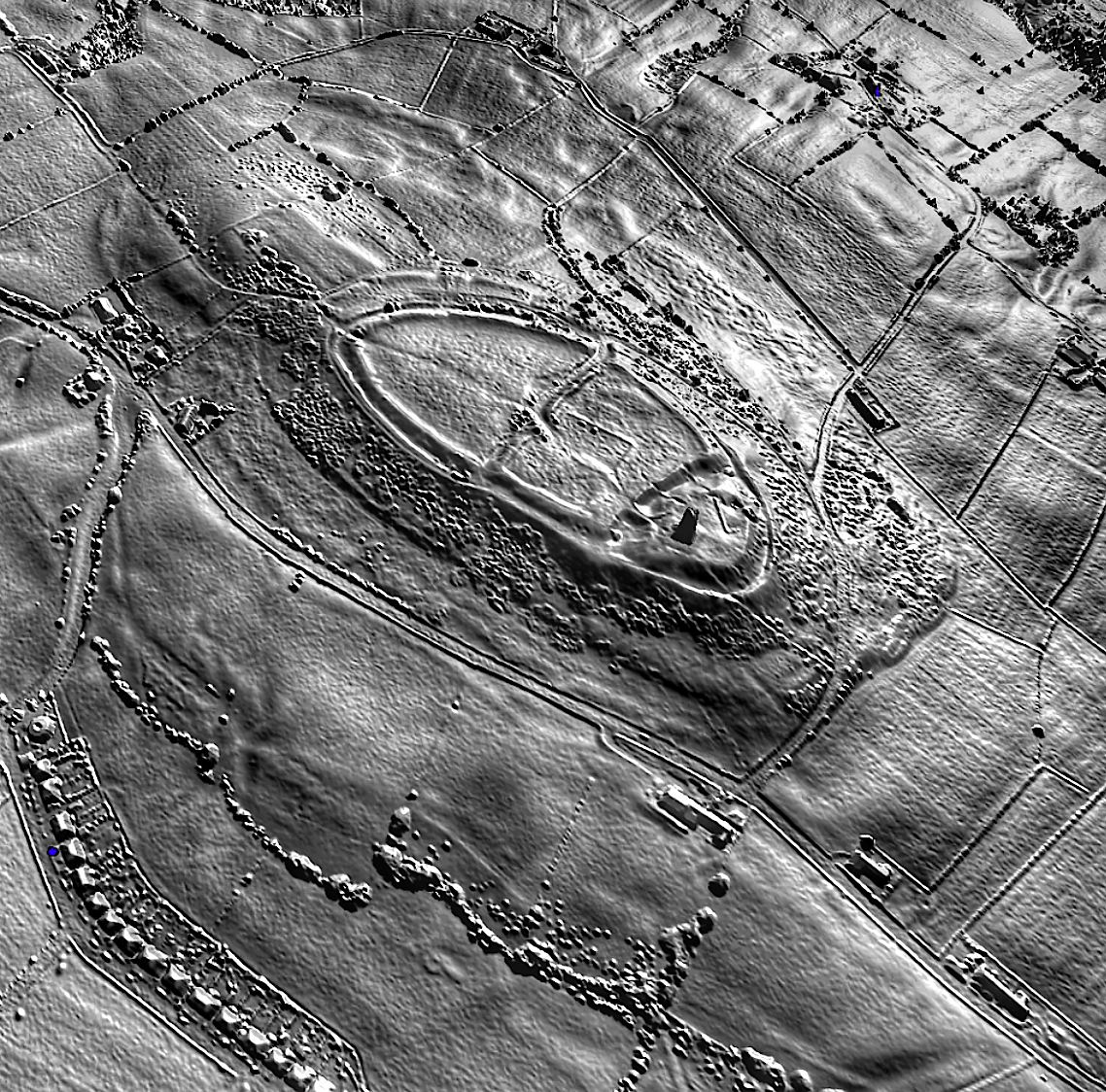
A lidar view of Castle Hill, site of a hill fort, castle and deserted medieval village

Huddersfield has an abundance of Victorian architecture. The most conspicuous landmark is the Victoria Tower on Castle Hill. Overlooking the town, the tower was constructed to mark Queen Victoria's Diamond Jubilee Year in 1897. A picture of the Victoria Tower features on the New Zealand wine Castle Hill.

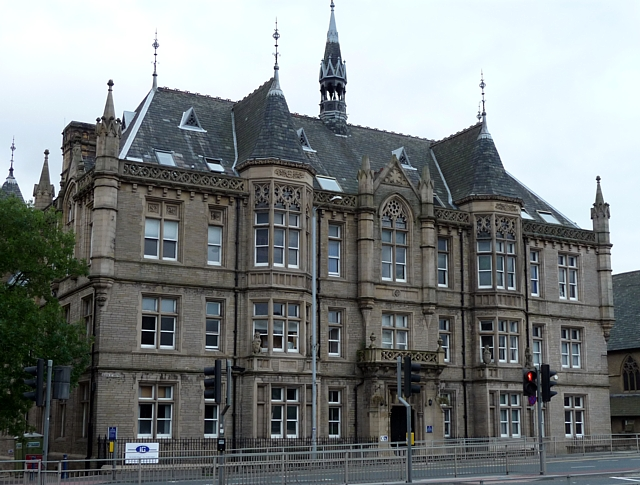
The Ramsden Building

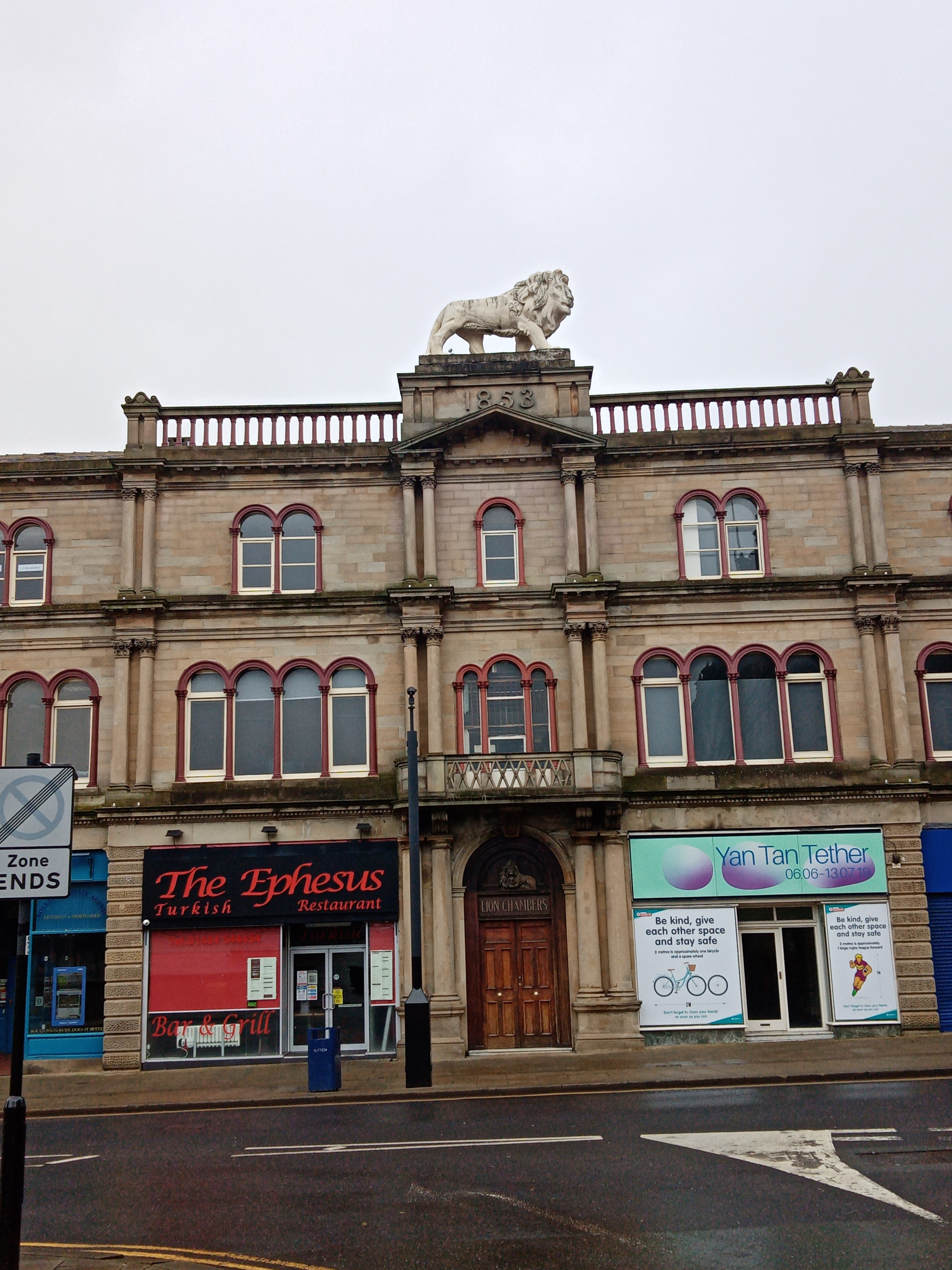
Lion chambers building on St George's Square

Huddersfield Town Hall is a municipal building in the town; it seats up to 1,200 people and hosts events ranging from classical to comedy and from choral to community events.

The colonnaded Huddersfield railway station in St George's Square was once described as 'a stately home with trains in it', and by Sir Nikolaus Pevsner as "one of the best early railway stations in England". A bronze statue of Huddersfield-born Sir Harold Wilson, Prime Minister 1964–1970 and 1974–1976, stands in front of its entrance.

The George Hotel designed by William Wallen was built by Wallen and Charles Child in 1850. The hotel's Italianate façade became Huddersfield's adopted architectural style as the town developed over following decade. The hotel was the site of the birthplace of Rugby league in August 1895.

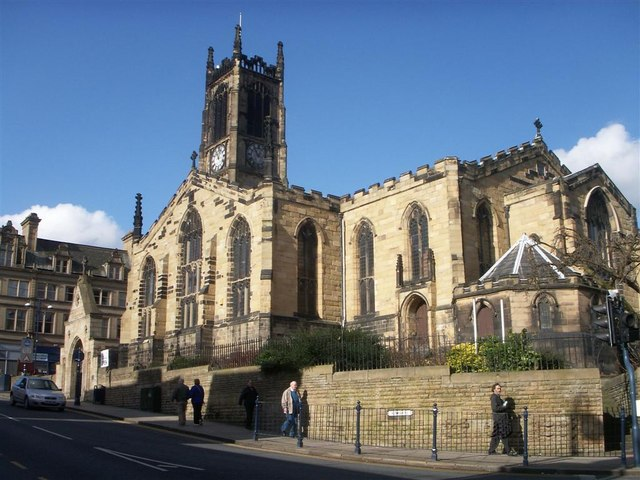
St Peter's Church

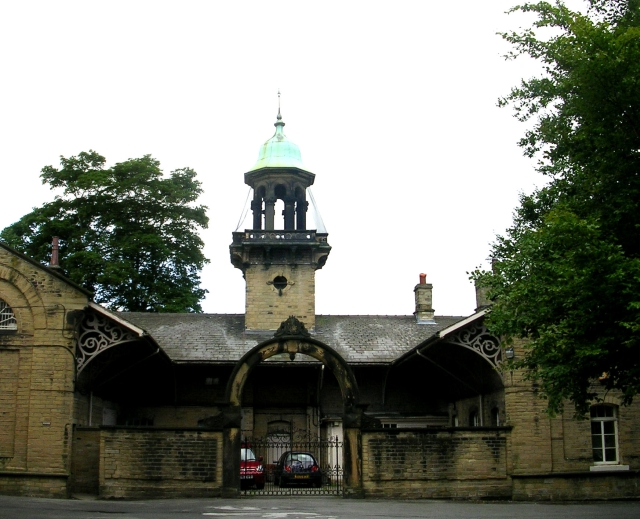
The Tolson Memorial Museum

St Peter's Church (Huddersfield Parish Church) replaced a church of the 11th century and is adjacent to the town centre, on Byram Street near the Pack Horse Centre. The church was built in 1838. Holy Trinity Church, just outside the town centre was built between 1816 and 1819.

The Pack Horse Centre is a covered pedestrianised shopping area constructed over a cobblestone street, Pack Horse Yard, renamed Pack Horse Walk. Pack horses carried merchandise over pack-horse routes across the Pennines before turnpike roads and railways improved transportation. The pedestrian link passes from Kirkgate, across King Street and along Victoria Lane, by the Shambles, to the Piazza and the distinctive market hall at Queensgate, which was built to replace the old Shambles Market Hall in the early 1970s. Next to the Piazza is the Victorian town hall and the 1930s public library.

Beaumont Park about 2 mi (3 km) south of the town centre was bequeathed to the town in the 1880s, by Henry Frederick Beaumont ("Beaumont's of Whitley" estate); it was opened on 13 October 1883, by Prince Leopold, fourth son of Queen Victoria, and his wife Princess Helena of Waldeck and Pyrmont (Duke and Duchess of Albany). It is a fine example of a Victorian era public park with water cascades, bandstand and woodland.

The former St Paul's Church on Queensgate has statutory recognition and protection, (Note: Being a listed building in the initial, mainstream, Grade II class) used for worship from 1831 to 1956. Sir John Ramsden gave its land and his family helped its extension to be built in 1883. The foundation stone was laid by Lady Guendolen Ramsden. The building is now part of the University of Huddersfield.

The St Paul's Street drill hall was designed by Captain William Willey Cooper and completed in 1901.

Greenhead Park, 3/8 mile (600 metres) west of the town centre, is lined with copses of various trees. A multimillion-pound restoration project, funded by the Heritage Lottery fund was finished in autumn 2012.

Ravensknowle Hall, built in the late-1850s, houses the Tolson (Memorial) Museum. The museum was founded in 1919, and was originally a natural history museum. It now also holds galleries on different historical fields, like transport, textiles and the history of the town.

== Filmography and media ==
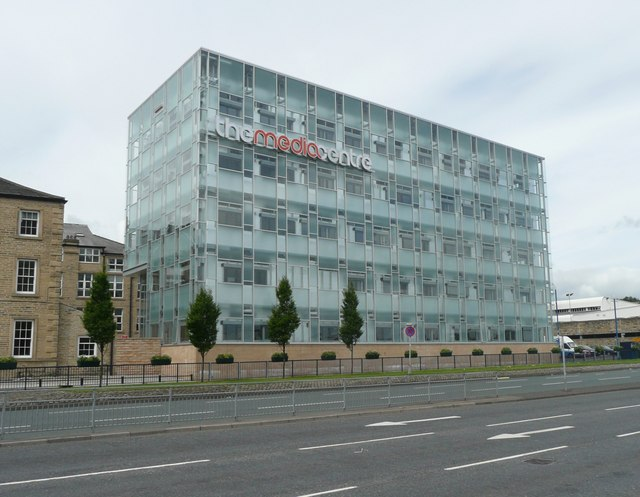
The Media Centre

The feature films Between Two Women and The Jealous God were filmed in and around Huddersfield. There is a Serbian film from 2007 called Hadersfild, a Serbian phonetic spelling of Huddersfield, where a character is from the town.

Television productions in and around the town include:

- Last Of The Summer Wine; filmed mainly in the Holme Valley around Holmfirth; some parts of the Colne Valley including Marsden and Slaithwaite were also used.
- Where the Heart Is filmed in the latter around Slaithwaite.
- Wokenwell, Slaithwaite and Marsden.
- The League of Gentlemen set around Marsden.
- Many of the exteriors of the ITV series Jericho were filmed at the nearby Rockingstone Quarry and some interior work was done at North Light Film Studios at Brookes Mill.
- BBC television series Happy Valley, exteriors and some filming at North Light Film Studios.
- Interiors for the BBC's Jamaica Inn, at North Light Film Studios.
- BBC's Remember Me, North Light Film Studios.
- ITV series Black Work, North Light Film Studios.

== Transport ==
=== Roads ===
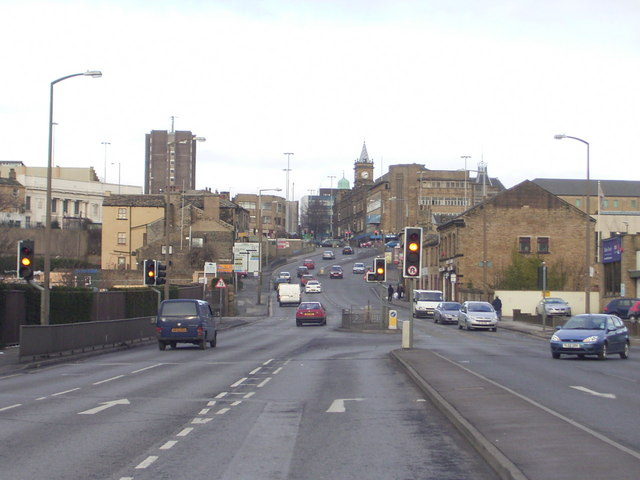
Chapel Hill

Huddersfield is connected to the motorway network via the:

- M1, which passes about 10 mi (16 km) to the east
- M62, which passes about 2 1/2 mi (4 km) to the north; the town is linked to it by three junctions: Mount (A640, J23 – limited access), Ainley Top (A629, J24) and between Brighouse and Cooper Bridge (A644, J25).

Huddersfield Corporation built an inner ring road, part of the A62, in the 1970s. The ring road now defines the boundary of the town's central business district. Its construction ended congestion within, where many roads are pedestrianised.

Main radial roads are the:

- A62 Leeds Road and Manchester Road
- A641 Bradford Road
- A629 Halifax Road
- A640 New Hey Road
- A642 Wakefield Road (in the east, it branches into the A629 Penistone Road).

=== Buses ===
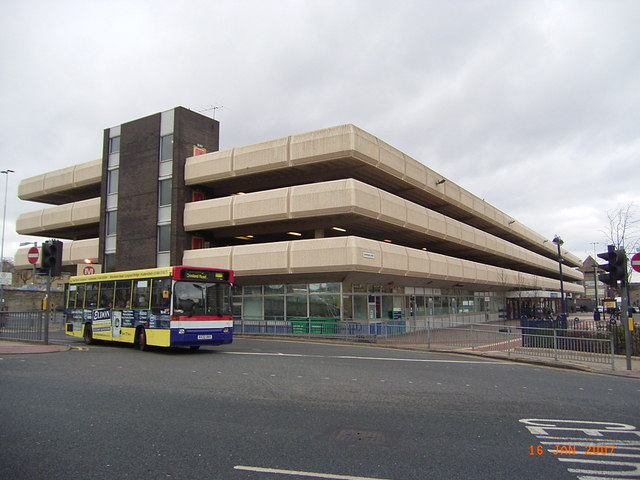
Huddersfield bus station

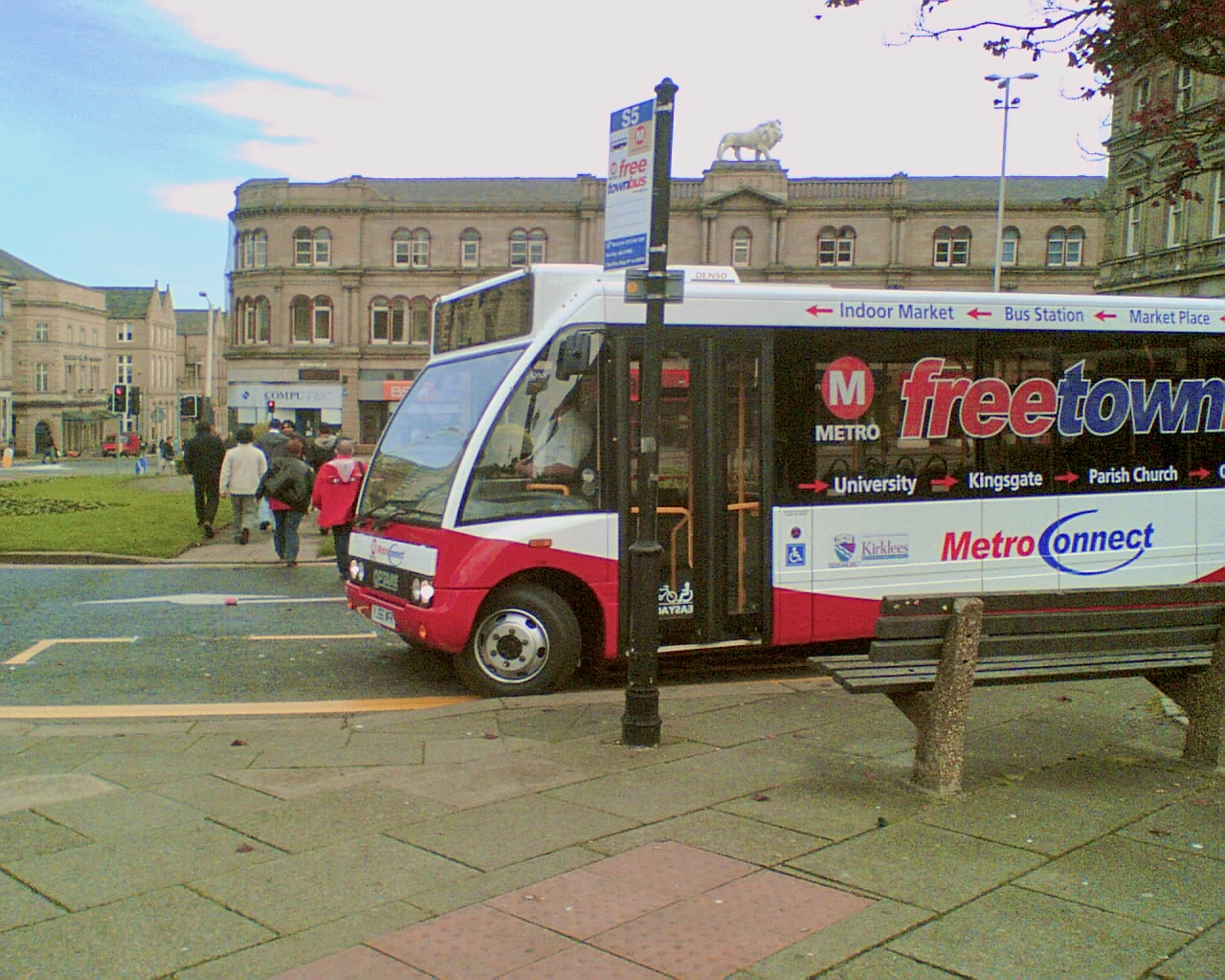
Huddersfield Free Town Bus

A trolleybus network operated from 1933 to 1968. Huddersfield bus station was opened by the Mayor, Councillor Mernagh on 26 March 1974, although it had not yet been completed. It is the busiest bus station in West Yorkshire, with a daily footfall of almost 35,000; most services use the bus station.

Huddersfield's bus operators reflect the national situation; local subsidiaries of three dominant national operators provide most services in the area:

- First Calderdale & Huddersfield provides most local services in the town and some services outside Kirklees with destinations including Bradford, Brighouse and Halifax
- Stagecoach Manchester operates the 184 service as part of the Bee Network to nearby Oldham in Greater Manchester, via Saddleworth
- Arriva Yorkshire provides frequent services to Dewsbury and Leeds
- Team Pennine operates almost all services in the south-east of the town, including a zero-fare town centre bus service, the Free Town Bus
- Other smaller operators include Stotts Coaches and Centrebus.

=== Railway ===
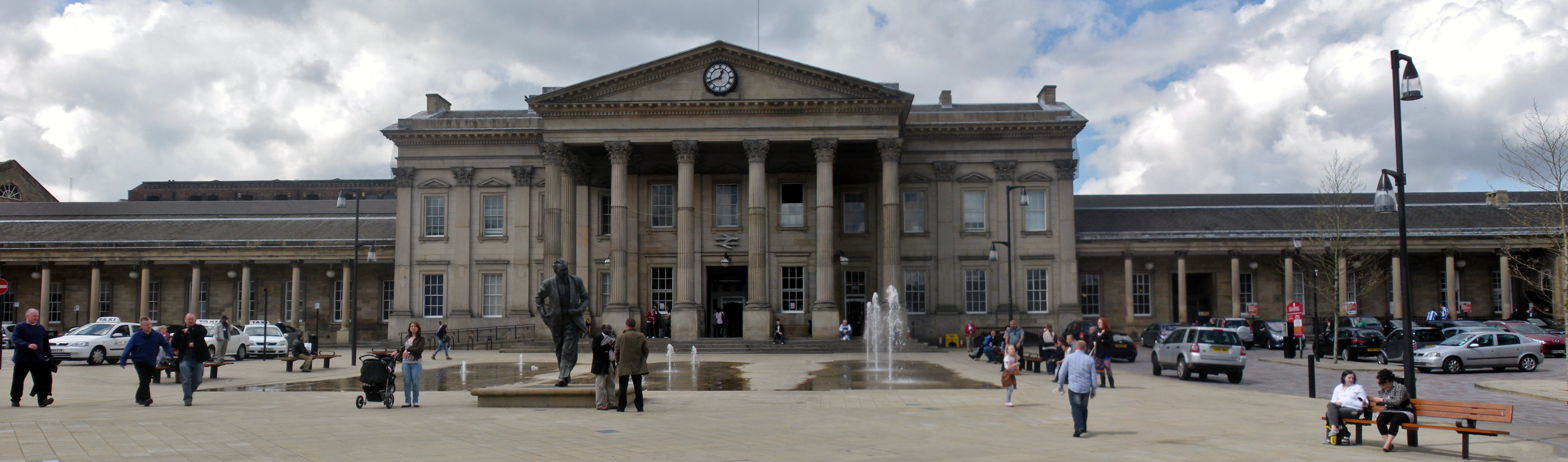
Huddersfield station, in St George's Square

Huddersfield railway station is served by two train operating companies:

- TransPennine Express runs frequent inter-city services to Leeds, Liverpool Lime Street, Manchester Piccadilly, Hull Paragon, Manchester Airport, Newcastle, Redcar Central, Scarborough and York
- Northern Trains links the town with Barnsley, Bradford Interchange, Brighouse, Dewsbury, Halifax, Leeds, Sheffield and Wakefield Kirkgate.

There are no direct services to London; passengers have to change at Leeds or Manchester Piccadilly for ongoing services with London North Eastern Railway or Avanti West Coast respectively.

Two internet-famous cats have frequented the station: black and white Felix and younger pure black Bolt. Merchandise has been produced and a book published.

The train station is currently at the heart of the Transpennine Route Upgrade, which is improving the station and electrifying the line.

=== Canal ===
The Huddersfield Broad Canal, originally the Sir John Ramsden Canal, and the Huddersfield Narrow Canal are both navigable by narrowboat; the broad canal by wider craft, wind around the south side of town.

To the rear of the YMCA, in the Turnbridge section, is an electrically-operated road bridge; it is still in use, to raise the road and allow boat traffic to pass. This bridge originally used a windlass.

== Education ==
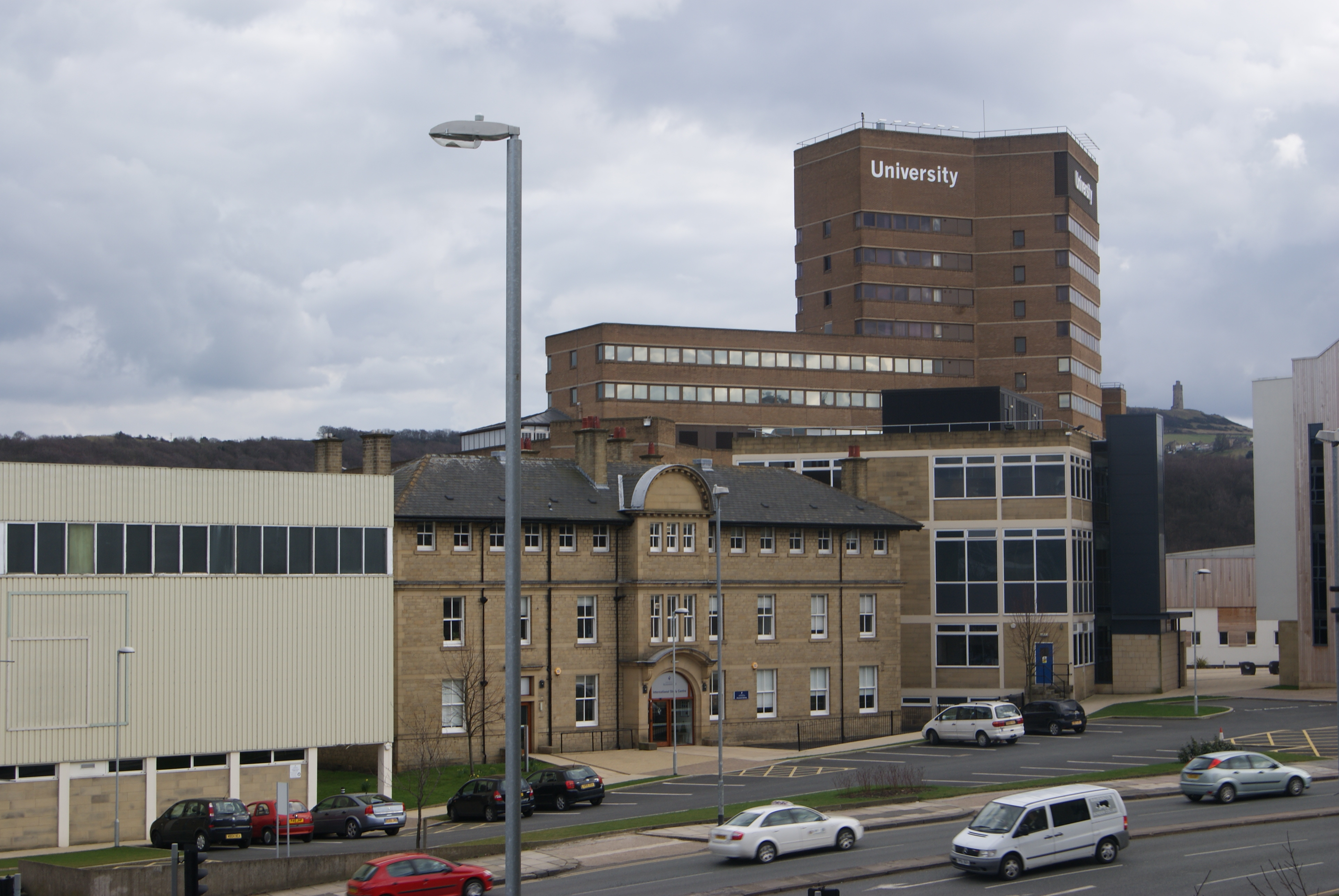
University of Huddersfield

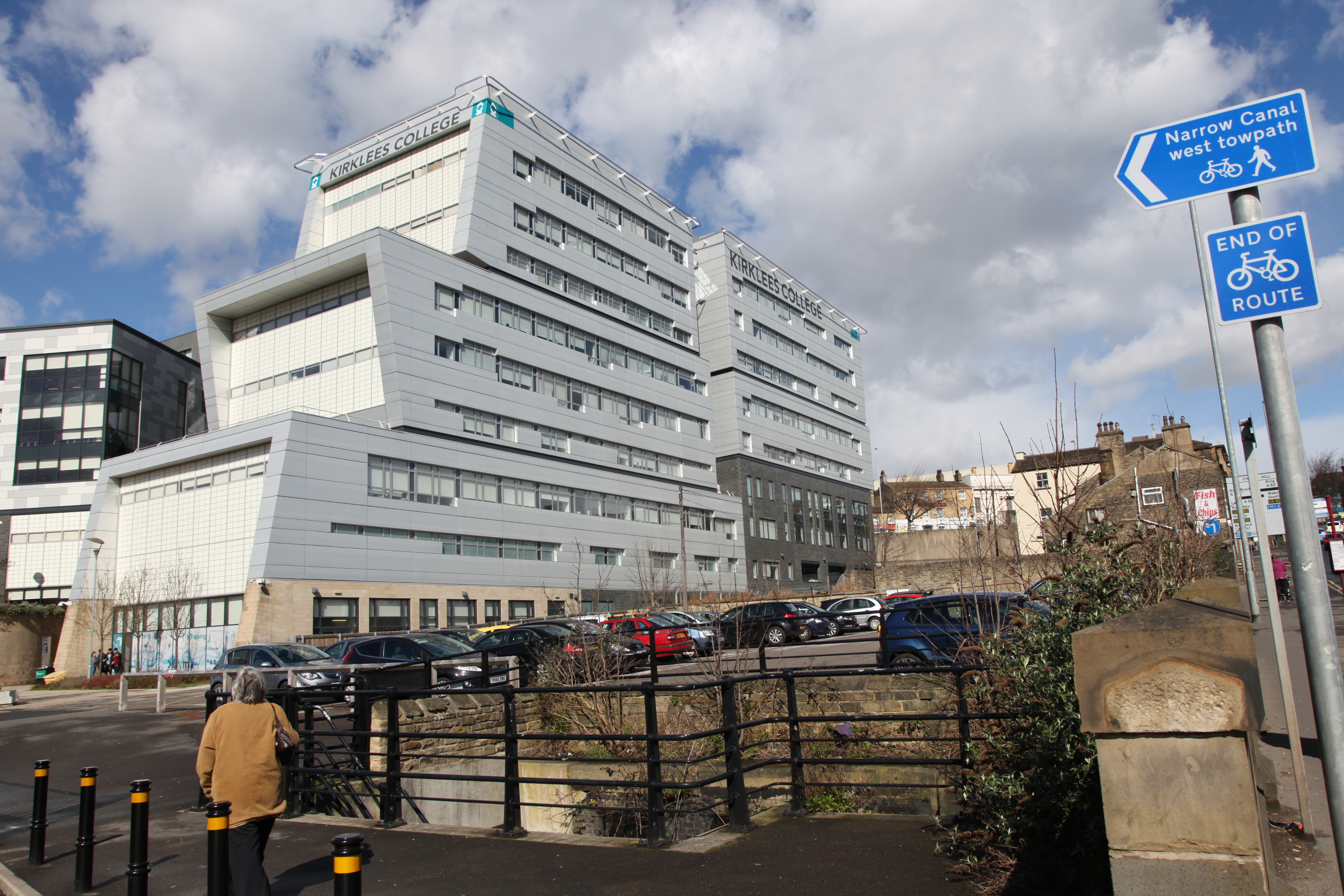
Kirklees College

As well as primary and secondary schools, which cover compulsory and sixth form education for the town's population, Huddersfield has two sixth form colleges: Huddersfield New College at Salendine Nook and Greenhead College west of the town centre. Huddersfield Grammar School is the only independent school for secondary education up to age 16.

The town has a further education college, Kirklees College, formed following the merger of Dewsbury College and Huddersfield Technical College. Its one establishment of higher education is the University of Huddersfield, whose chancellor until 2019 was the former Prince Andrew. The actor Patrick Stewart, from Mirfield, is emeritus chancellor.

== Sport ==
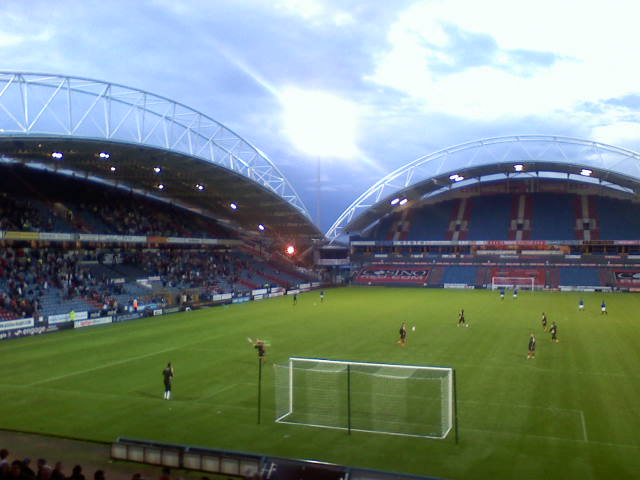
John Smith's Stadium, also known as the Kirklees Stadium and the Huddersfield Giants' Stadium

Association and rugby league football codes are the main spectator sports in Huddersfield. The Accu Stadium is home to both professional clubs in the town. The rugby club left its Fartown home to share the association football club's ground at Leeds Road, both clubs then left Leeds Road in 1994 to share the stadium. The town also has Rugby Union clubs and the Huddersfield Rams Aussie Rules club. In May 2022, the town made national and world headlines when its 2 professional sports teams both played in finals in London on the same weekend on 28/29 May

=== Association Football ===
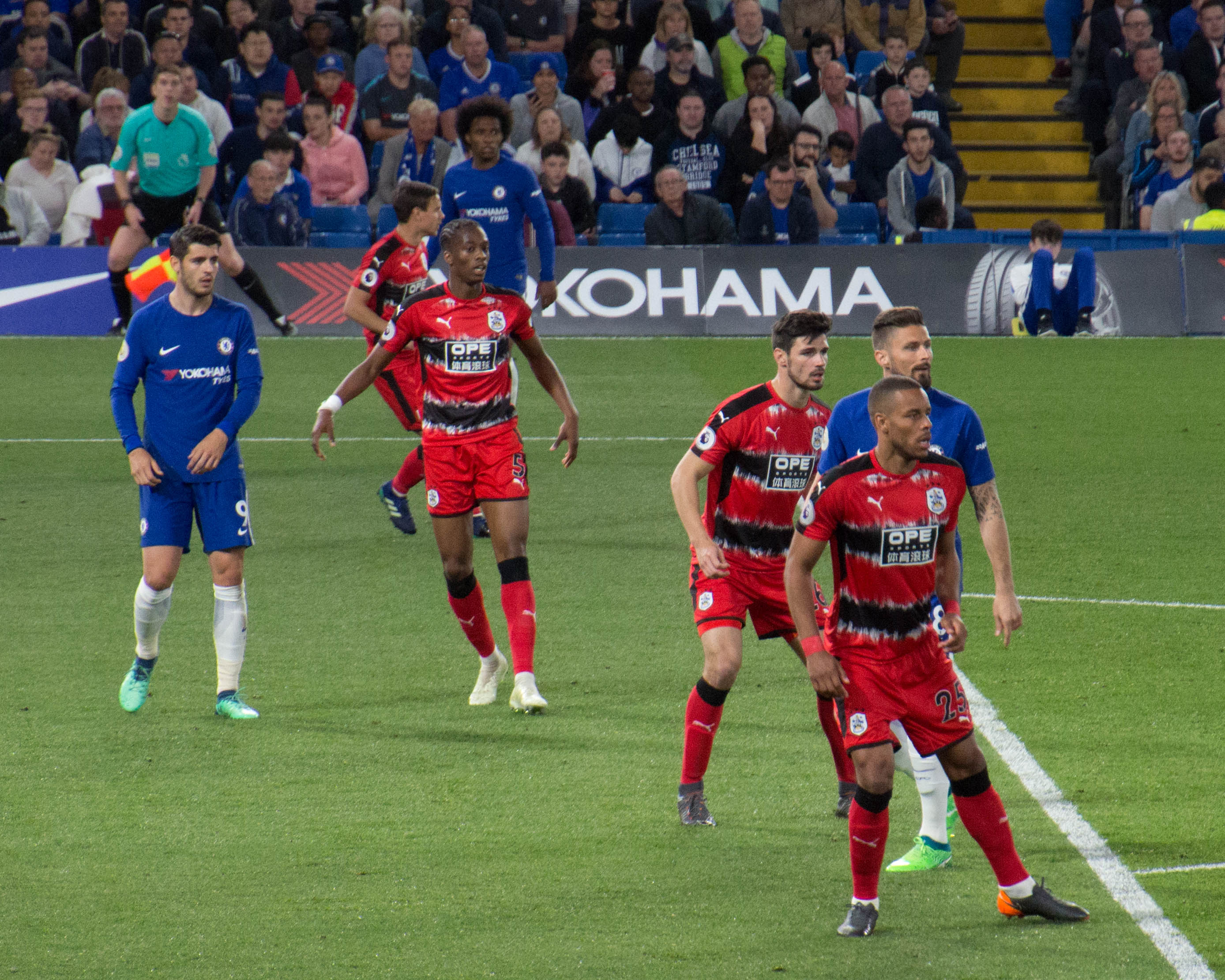
Huddersfield Town playing away at Chelsea in the Premier League (2018)

Its professional association football team, Huddersfield Town is the town's senior association football team, founded in 1908; for most seasons, they play in League One, the second highest league of the sport nationally. In 1926, the club became the first in England to win three successive league titles, a feat only four other clubs have matched.

In 1921–22, Huddersfield won the FA Cup and, between 1923 and 1926, became the first club to win the League Championship three times in a row; an achievement matched only by four other teams. After several decades in lower divisions, Huddersfield Town FC returned to top flight football in 2017, when the club entered the Premier League for the first time.

Notable ex-players include Scottish international Denis Law, Ray Wilson, a World Cup winner with England in 1966 and Trevor Cherry, England international. Herbert Chapman, Bill Shankly, Neil Warnock and Steve Bruce are notable former Huddersfield Town managers.

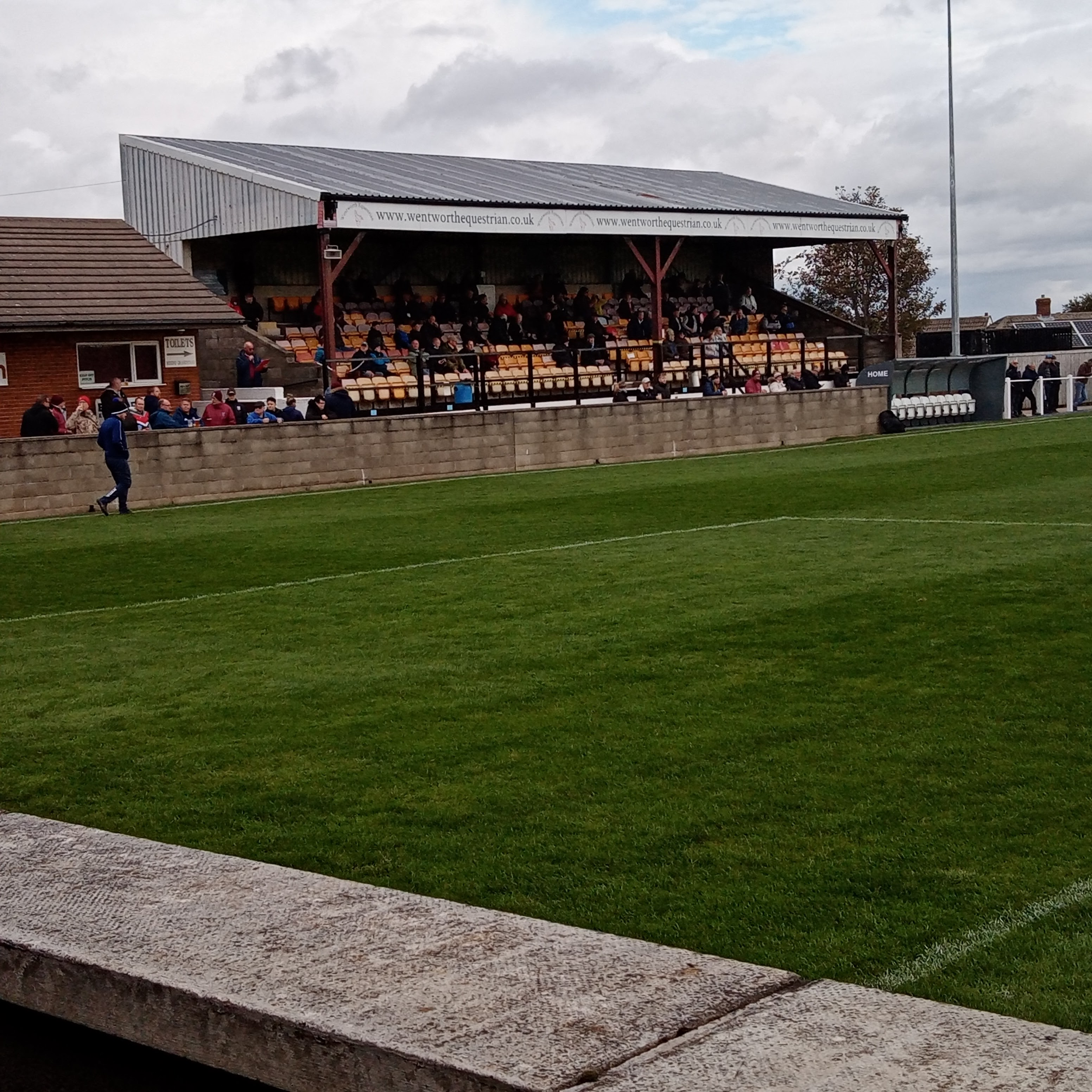
Emley A.F.C. play at the Welfare Ground

Also within the town boundaries is Emley A.F.C. who were formed when the original Emley FC left for Wakefield who play in the Northern Counties East Football League and Golcar Utd who also compete in the NCEL league and share the "HD derby" with Emley. Shelley are also within the town's boundaries and most recently played in the West Yorkshire Association Football League having previously played alongside Emley and Golcar in the North West Counties Football League Division 1 North.

=== Rugby ===
Rugby was first played in the town in 1848 and the Huddersfield Athletic Club, formed in 1864 and played its first rugby game in 1866. The town was the birthplace of rugby league. On 29 August 1895, 22 northern clubs met in the George Hotel and voted to secede from the Rugby Football Union and set up the 'Northern Rugby Football Union' which became the Rugby Football League in 1922. The Rugby League Heritage Centre was in the George Hotel's basement before the hotel closed in 2013.

==== League ====
Following the split of 1895, Huddersfield became a focus for rugby league. HAC's direct successors, the Huddersfield Giants, who played at the famous Fartown Ground until 1992 before sharing with the Football club, play in the Super League. It is the top division in Europe. Huddersfield Rugby Union Football Club play in National Division Three North and Huddersfield Y.M.C.A. RUFC play in North 1 East. Huddersfield Giants, the town's rugby league club, has won the Rugby Football League Championship seven times, most recently in 1961–62, and the Challenge Cup six times, the last time in 1952–53.

The town is also home to the Huddersfield Underbank Rangers, who play in the Rugby League Conference. The club is based in Holmfirth and formed in 1884. It has launched the careers of many professional players including Harold Wagstaff, Paul Dixon and Eorl Crabtree.

==== Union ====
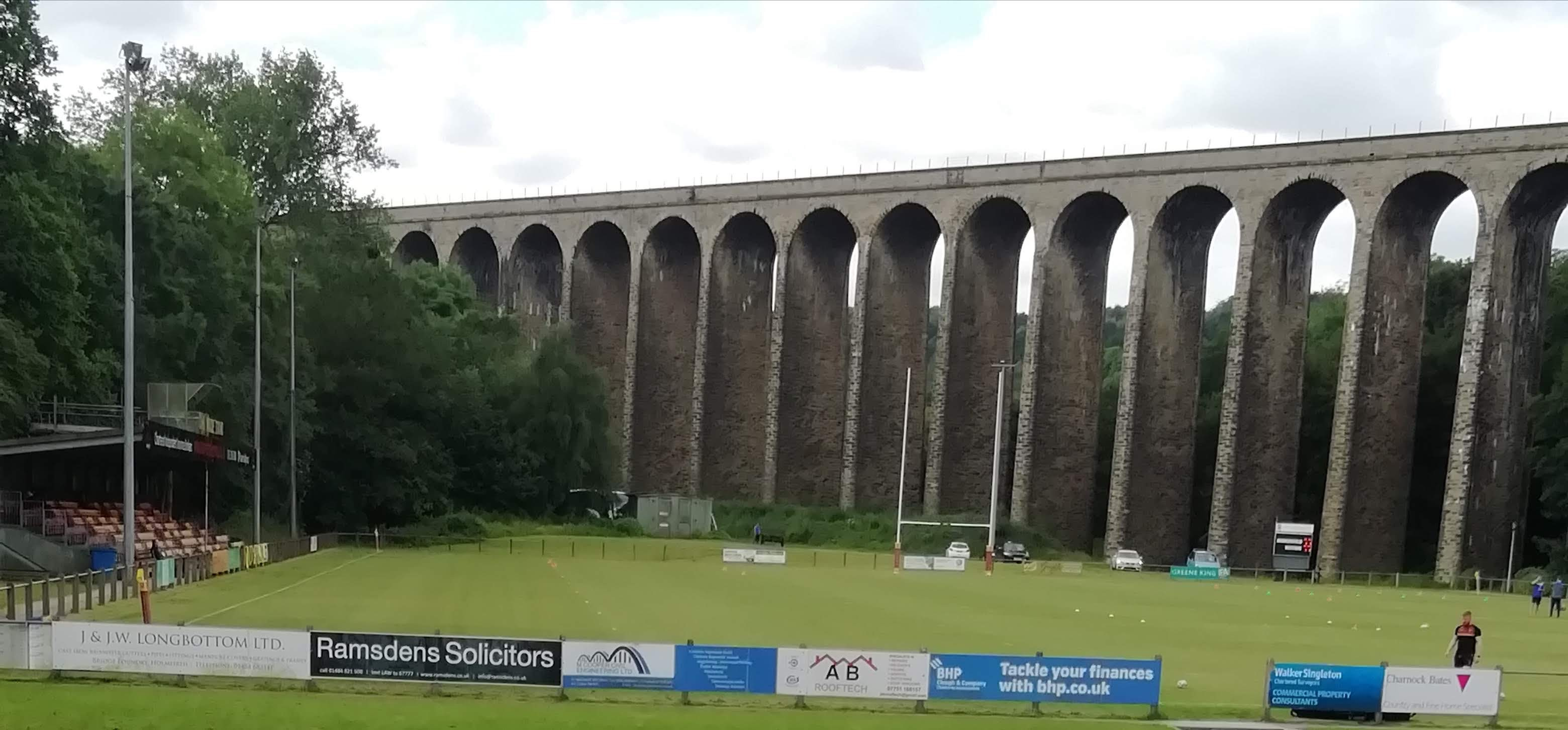
Huddersfield RUFC's Lockwood Park, under the viaduct carrying the Penistone Line

After 1895, rugby union was played exclusively under the Northern Rugby Football Union until 1909 when Huddersfield Old Boys were formed to play under rugby union rules, playing nomadically at five grounds until buying farmland at Waterloo in 1919 and, in 1946, renaming the club Huddersfield RUFC. In 1969, the club was at the forefront of a revolution in English rugby when it became the first club in the country to organise mini and junior rugby teams. The innovation spread and almost every club in the country has a thriving junior section providing a production-line of home-grown talent. Junior players at Huddersfield number over 200.

In 1997 the Waterloo junior grounds were sold and the 26-acre (11-hectare) former Bass Brewery site at Lockwood Park was purchased for its replacement. With the assistance of a £2 million grant from Sport England, the club has transformed it into a major sports complex, conference centre and business park.

=== Aussie rules ===
Huddersfield Rams Aussie Rules was formed in 2008. The club played its first season in 2009 and won the Aussie Rules UK National League – Central Division and took part in the North West Division in 2010.

=== Other ===
The Huddersfield Cricket League was founded in 1891. Huddersfield has produced multiple Yorkshire CCC cricketers including 14 internationals, such as Alec Coxon, Billy Bates and Chris Balderstone.

Huddersfield has a number of field hockey teams, many of which train at the Lockwood Park sports complex on the all-weather pitch.

Motorcycle speedway racing was staged in Huddersfield in the UK pioneer year of 1928. A venue in the town staged four or five meetings. James Whitham is a former 'British Superbike Champion'. Lepton born Tom Sykes joined the Yamaha Motor Italia World team in the 2009 World Superbike season after spells in British Supersports & British Superbikes in which he finished 4th in the 2009 Season. He won his first race in World Superbikes in one of two wildcard meetings and is the 2013 World Superbike Champion.

On 6 July 2014, stage 2 of the 2014 Tour de France from York to Sheffield passed through the town.

Tasmanian Rugby is a Huddersfield Boxing Day Tradition.,

== List of civic honours and freedoms ==
Thirty-four people and one military (infantry) regiment have been granted the Freedom of Huddersfield, between 1889 and 1973.

- Wright Mellor JP DL – (25 September 1889)
- Henry Frederick Beaumont JP DL – (28 August 1894)
- Lt Col Sir Albert Kaye Rollit LLD DLC LittD JP DL – (28 August 1894)
- James Nield Sykes JP – (12 March 1895)
- Joseph Woodhead JP – (28 October 1898)
- Sir Joseph Crosland Knt JP DL – (28 October 1898)
- Major Charles Brook – (23 May 1901)
- Major Harold Wilson – (23 May 1901)
- Sir Thomas Brooke Bart JP DL – (25 July 1906)
- Rev Robert Bruce MA DD – (25 July 1906)
- William Brooke JP – (15 October 1913)
- John Sykes JP – (15 October 1913)
- William Henry Jessop JP – (18 September 1918)
- Earnest Woodhead MA JP – (18 September 1918)
- George Thomson JP – (18 September 1918)
- Benjamin Broadbent CBE MA JP – (18 September 1918)
- John Arthur Brooke MA JP – (18 September 1918)
- James Edward Willans JP – (18 September 1918)
- Admiral of the Fleet Earl Beatty GCB OM GCVO DSO – (24 July 1920)
- The Rt Hon H. H. Asquith Earl of Oxford and Asquith, and Viscount Asquith – (6 November 1925)
- Sir William Pick Raynor Knt JP – (17 December 1926)
- Wilfrid Dawson JP – (25 July 1934)
- Rowland Mitchell JP – (25 July 1934)
- James Albert Woolven JP Chevalier de la Légion d'honneur – (25 July 1934)
- Sir Bernard Law Montgomery Field-Marshal GCB DSO – (26 October 1945)
- Joseph Barlow JP – (23 June 1949)
- Duke of Wellington's Regiment (West Riding) – (2 July 1952)
- Sidney Kaye LLB – (19 November 1957)
- Alderman Arthur Gardiner OBE JP – (11 October 1960)
- Alderman Harry Andrew Bennie Gray CBE JP – (11 October 1960)
- Sir Malcolm Sargent MusD(Dunelm) MusD(Oxon)(Hons) LLD(Liverpool) Hon RAM Hon FRCO FRCM FRSA – (13 October 1961)
- The Rt Hon Harold Wilson OBE MP Prime Minister and First Lord of the Treasury – (1 March 1968)
- Alderman Douglas Graham CBE – (5 March 1973)
- Alderman Reginald Harmley MBE JP – (5 March 1973)
- Alderman Clifford Stephenson – (5 March 1973)

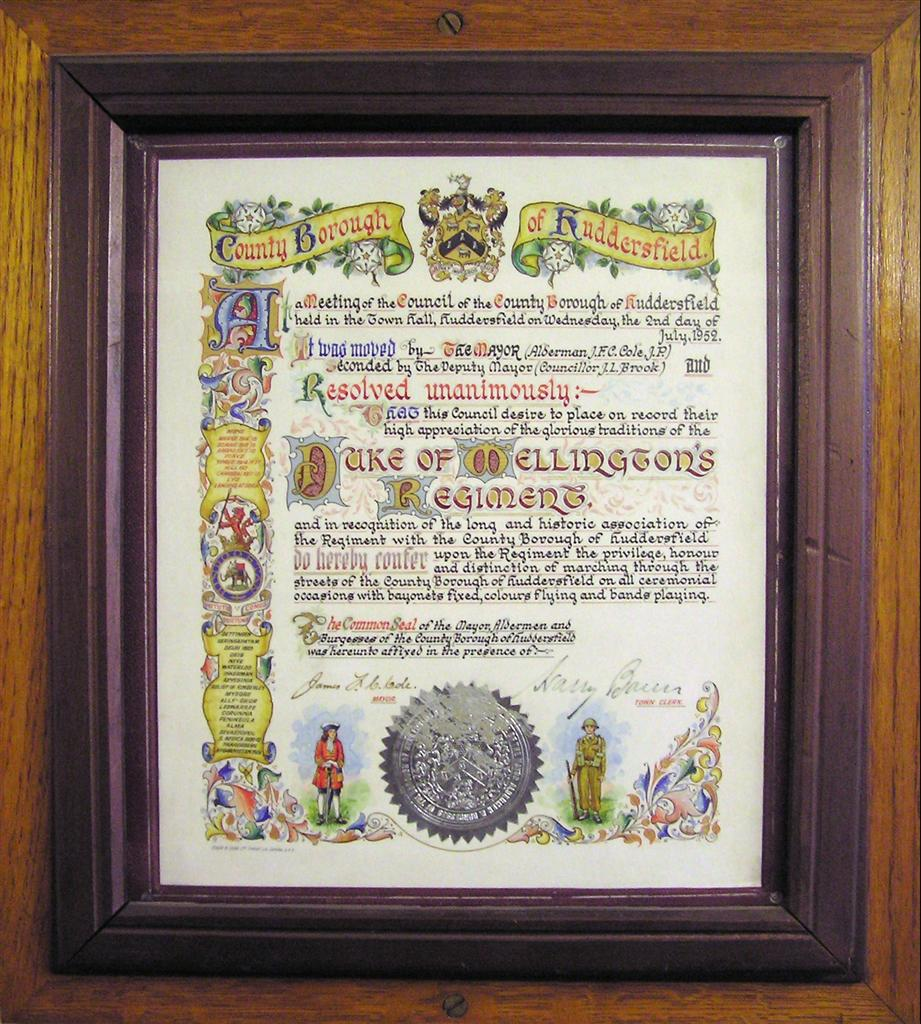
DWR Freedom Scroll

On 2 July 1952, in recognition of historic ties and links with the Duke of Wellington's Regiment (West Riding), the Huddersfield County Borough had conferred on the regiment the Freedom of the Town. This gave the regiment the right to march through the town with 'flags flying, bands playing and bayonets fixed'. Many of the town and district's male residents had served in the regiment during its long history. This right was technically lost when merged with Dewsbury to form Kirklees MBC. On 25 March 1979, the latter gave the Freedom of Kirklees to the 3rd battalion of the Yorkshire Volunteers; this being the Duke of Wellington's Territorial Army unit.

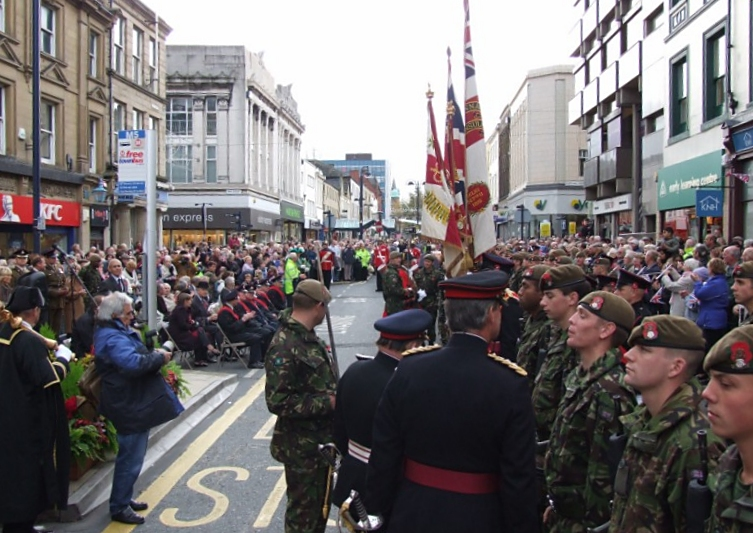
Conferring the Freedom of Huddersfield on the Yorkshire Regiment, 25 October 2008

When the 'Dukes' were amalgamated with the Prince of Wales's Own Regiment of Yorkshire and the Green Howards' to form the Yorkshire Regiment on 6 June 2006, the right to march became extinct. The Regiment requested a resumed right to march. The right given by Kirklees to the 3rd battalion of the Yorkshire Volunteers did not permit any transfer to heirs or successors and effectively ceased when the battalion was amalgamated into the East and West Riding Regiment; since 2006, it has been known as the Yorkshire Regiment's 4th Battalion. Kirklees Metropolitan Borough Council amended the original 'Freedom' and transferred it to the Yorkshire Regiment, at a Freedom parade on 25 October 2008.

== Notable people ==
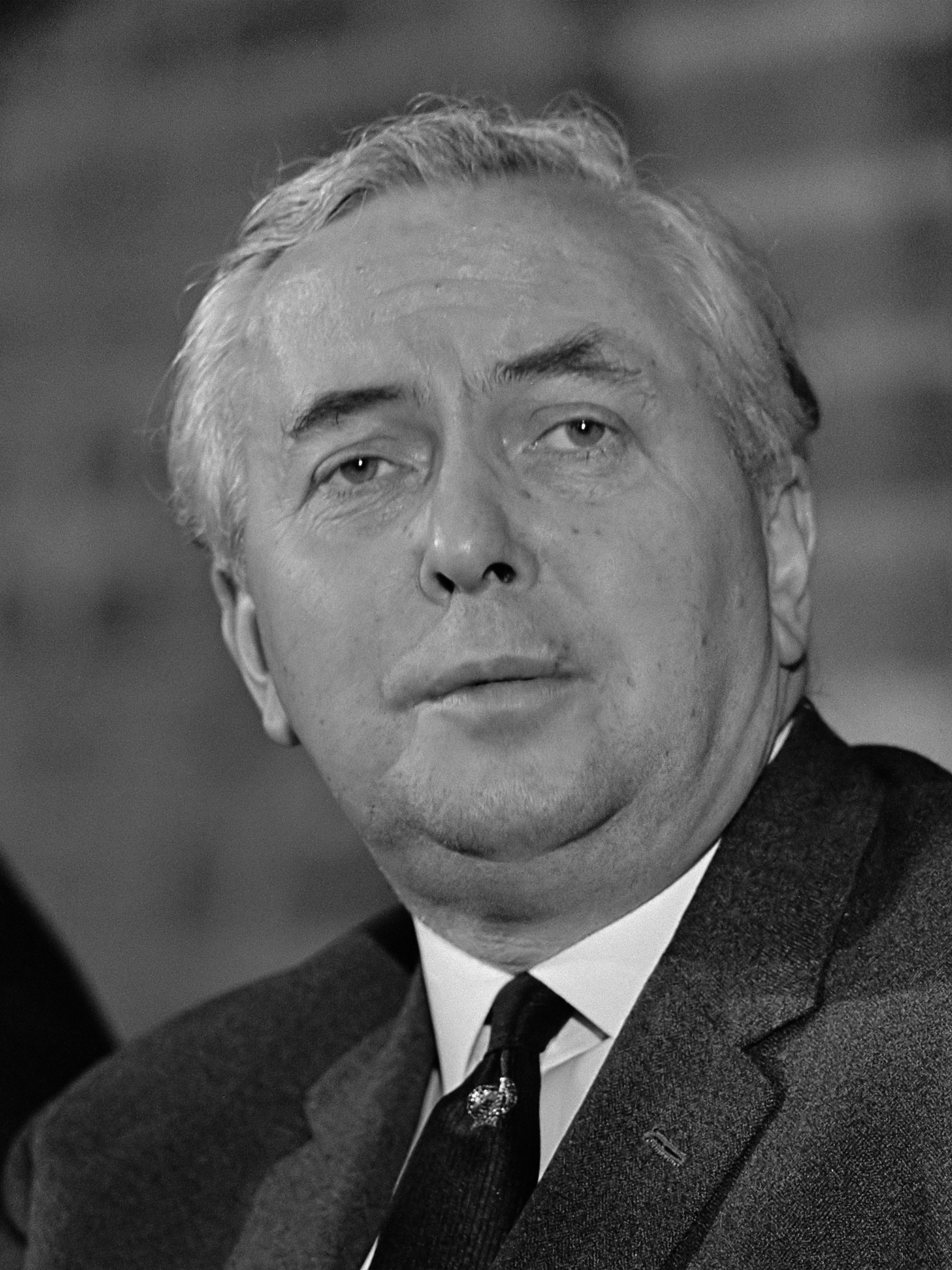
Harold Wilson, former Prime Minister of the United Kingdom

A number of national and internationally famous people originate from Huddersfield. Actors include Joanna Christie, James Mason, Gorden Kaye and Keith Buckley. TV playwright Sally Wainwright's award-winning dramas such as Happy Valley have made the Colne and Calder valley towns well known to television viewers. Some people have also become known through their association with Huddersfield, though they were not born there. These include the Mirfield-born actor ("life-long" Huddersfield Town F.C. supporter and Chancellor of Huddersfield University from 2004 to 2015), Patrick Stewart; the dancer, entertainer and TV presenter Roy Castle, who was born in Scholes; the York-born Olympic gold medal-winning swimmer, Anita Lonsbrough; and the Brighouse born inventor Wilf Lunn, who was raised in Rastrick. Other famous people whose association with Huddersfield is not as notable or well-known, though they were raised there, include H. H. Asquith (born in Morley), who served as the Liberal Prime Minister of the United Kingdom between 1908 and 1916. The actress Lena Headey, who was born in Bermuda, grew up in Shelley from the age of five. Harold Wilson, the only Labour Prime Minister to have formed Labour administrations after four general elections, was born at Warneford Road, Milnsbridge, in the western suburbs, on 11 March 1916. When Wilson was eight, he visited London and a much-reproduced photograph was taken of him standing on the doorstep of 10 Downing Street. Wilson attended Royds Hall Grammar School (now a comprehensive school).

=== Notable people born in and near to Huddersfield ===
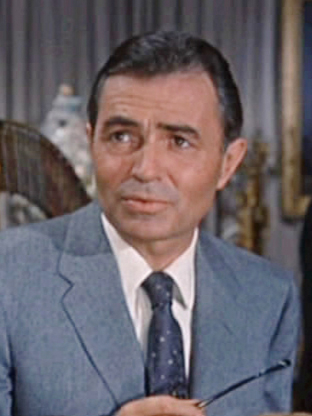
Film actor James Mason

- Catherine Aird, crime novelist
- Simon Armitage, Marsden-born poet, playwright and novelist.
- Chris Balderstone, first-class cricketer and professional footballer.
- Lawrence Batley, entrepreneur and philanthropist. The Lawrence Batley Theatre on Queen Street is named after him.
- Christina Beardsley, priest and advocate for transgender inclusion in the Church of England
- Ephraim Beaumont, American politician; Wisconsin State Assemblyman.
- Richard Beaumont, actor.
- Ian Berry, artist who uses denim as his medium.
- Andy Booth, former professional footballer for Huddersfield Town and Sheffield Wednesday.
- David Borrow, Labour politician and Member of Parliament.
- Tim Bricheno, English guitarist and songwriter.
- Sir William Broadbent, neurologist and Physician in Ordinary to Queen Victoria and King Edward VII
- Sir David Brown, managing director of David Brown Ltd.
- Keith Buckley, Actor who co-starred with fellow Huddersfield born actor James Mason in the film Spring and Port Wine and played Sir Henry Morton Stanley in the Emmy Award-winning The Search for the Nile.
- Charles Clough, geologist and cartographer.
- Fraizer Campbell, professional footballer who has played for several teams including Huddersfield Town.
- Joanna Christie, actress who appeared in the Netflix original series "Narcos".
- Trevor Ó Clochartaigh, Irish republican and Sinn Féin senator for Galway West.
- Eorl Crabtree, former professional rugby league footballer and television pundit.
- Billy Currie, multi-instrumentalist and member of Ultravox and Visage.
- Richard Earnshaw, first-class cricketer
- Marcus Ellis, badminton player, bronze medalist at the 2016 Summer Olympics
- James Hanson (Baron Hanson), Conservative life-peer and industrialist (co-founder of Hanson plc).
- Tom "Razor" Hardwick, guitarist of English rock bands Chubby and the Gang, Big Cheese and Violent Reaction.
- Benjamin Hick, civil and mechanical engineer, art collector and patron.
- Sir Harold Percival Himsworth, scientist.
- George Hirst, test and first-class cricketer for England and Yorkshire County Cricket Club.
- Shakespeare Hirst, actor, art collector and Shakespearean scholar.
- Nina Hossain, journalist and ITN television presenter
- Derek Ibbotson, Olympic athlete.
- Francis Ernest Jackson, painter, draughtsman, poster designer and lithographer.
- Cameron Jerome, professional footballer for Derby County.
- Gorden Kaye, BAFTA-nominated comic actor.
- Zöe Lucker, actress.
- James Mason, actor who gained international fame in Hollywood.
- Jermaine McGillvary, rugby league player for Huddersfield Giants and England.
- Vivek Murthy. 19th and 21st Surgeon General of the United States.
- Sir Walter Parratt, composer and organist.
- DJ Q, disc jockey, radio presenter and producer.
- Wilfred Rhodes, test and first-class cricketer for England and Yorkshire County Cricket Club.
- Brian Shaw, ballet dancer.
- Rod Smallwood, music manager.
- Jon Stead, professional footballer.
- Sir Patrick Stewart, actor known for Star Trek: The Next Generation and the Shakespearean stage.
- Tom Sykes, World Superbike Champion.
- D. R. Thorpe, political biographer.
- Sally Wainwright, English television writer, producer, and director.
- John Whitaker, equestrian and former Olympian.
- Jodie Whittaker, actress.
- Harold Wilson, Baron Wilson of Rievaulx, Labour politician and twice Prime Minister of the United Kingdom.
- Haydn Wood, composer and violinist.
- John Woodhead, businessman and former mayor of Cape Town.

== See also ==
- Haddersfield, Jamaica, locally referred to and named after Huddersfield
- Huddersfield Ben, dog from the area in the 1860s that was the progenitor of the Yorkshire Terrier breed of dog
- Kirklees Incinerator
- Huddersfield power station.
