= Coat of arms of Huddersfield =

Local coat of arms

The Coat of Arms of the Borough of Huddersfield

The Coat of arms of Huddersfield was the official symbol of the local government of Huddersfield (the Corporation of Huddersfield). The borough was abolished in 1974, 106 years after its incorporation in 1868, under the provisions of the Local Government Act 1972 whereby control was ceded to Kirklees Metropolitan Council and West Yorkshire Metropolitan County Council.

== Symbolism ==
The arms were granted by the College of Arms by letters patent dated 12 October 1868 to the Mayor, Aldermen, and Burgesses of the Borough of Huddersfield. The design was partly based on the arms of the family of Ramsden of Byrom, owners of the manors of Almondbury and Huddersfield:

Argent on a chevron between three fleurs-de-lis Sable, as many rams' heads couped at the neck of the first.

The crest of a ram's head is similar to that granted to the borough of Barrow-in-Furness in the previous year; this also referred to the Ramsden family arms.

The arms feature the motto Juvat Impigros Deus which is Latin for "God helps the diligent," also rendered as "God Helps the Industrious," and the common form, "God Helps Them That Help Themselves."

== Blazon ==
The formal description, or blazon, of the arms is:

Or on a chevron between three Rams passant Sable as many towers argent. And for the Crest on a Wreath of the Colours a Rams head couped argent armed Or gorged with a collar sable in the mouth A Sprig of the Cotton-tree slipped and fructed proper. Motto: Juvat Impigros Deus.

== Sources ==
- W. H. Fox-Talbot, The Book of Public Arms, 2nd edition, London 1915
- W. C. Scott-Giles, Civic Heraldry of England and Wales, 2nd edition, London, 1953
- G. Briggs, Civic and Corporate Heraldry, London, 1971
