= Piazza Centre =

Shopping centre in Huddersfield, England

Coordinates: 53°38′39.83″N 1°46′50.21″W

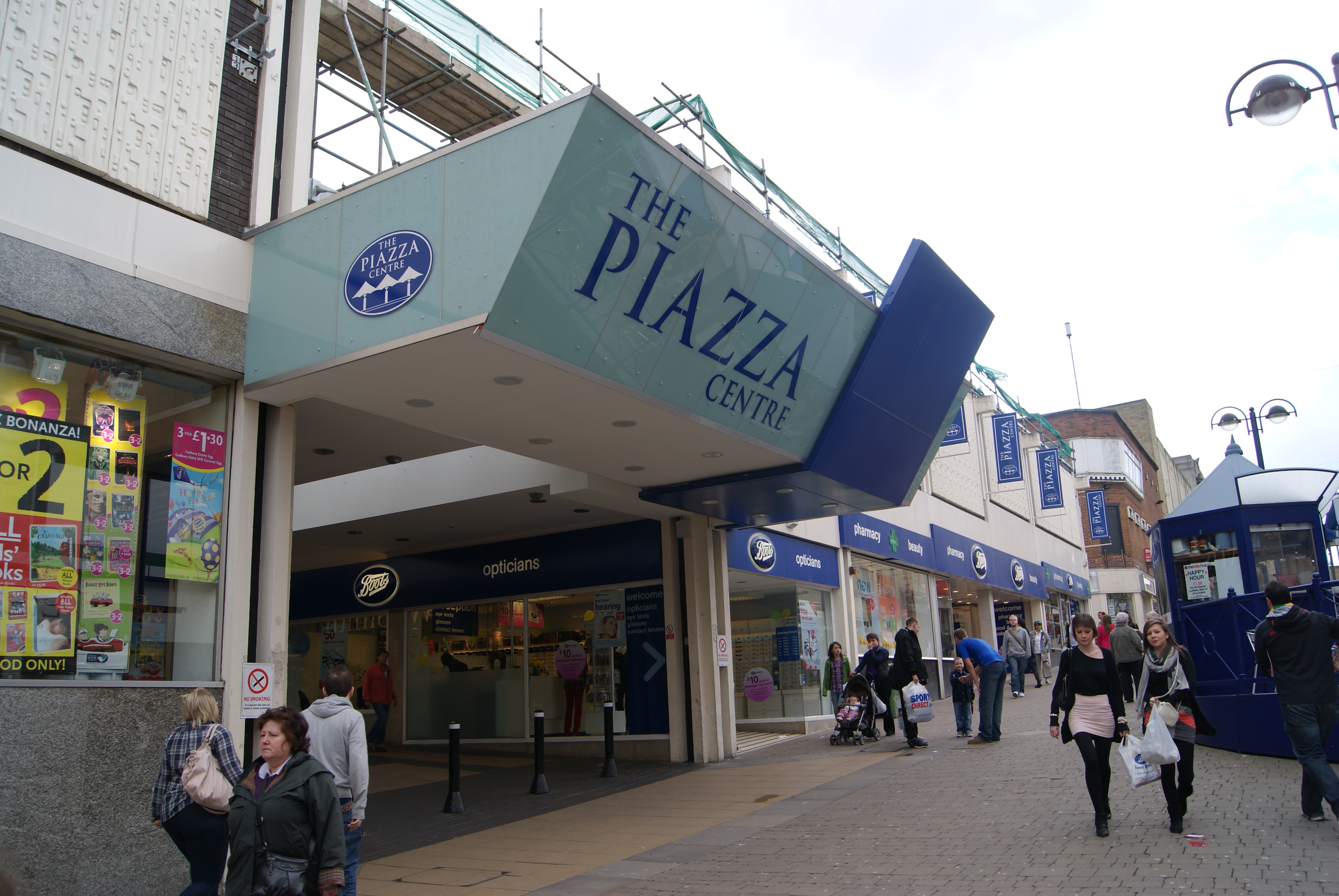
The entrance to the Piazza Centre from King Street

The Piazza Centre is a shopping centre in Huddersfield, West Yorkshire, England.

== History ==
The Piazza Centre was built on the site of the Market Hall, which was demolished in 1970.

A town regeneration plan published by Kirklees Council in June 2019 which proposed demolishing the Piazza Centre. Historic England issued a Certificate of Immunity from Listing in November 2022, guaranteeing that the shopping centre would not be statutorily listed within the next five years.

In 2021, Huddersfield Art Gallery was temporarily relocated to the Piazza Centre to allow work to take place on the original building. A campaign has since launched to oppose the demolition of the Piazza Centre, arguing that the spaces within it are beneficial to local arts communities.
