= Edgerton, Huddersfield =

Coordinates: 53.654668°N 1.801466°W

Edgerton
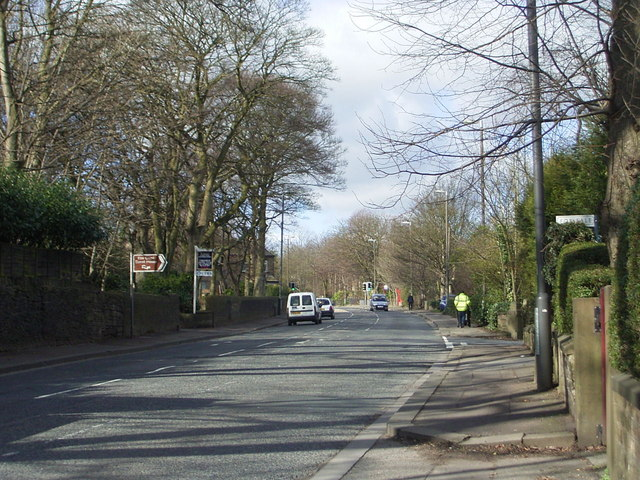
- Edgerton Road in Edgerton

- Location within West Yorkshire
- Metropolitan borough: Kirklees
- Metropolitan county: West Yorkshire
- Region: Yorkshire and the Humber
- Country: England
- Sovereign state: United Kingdom
- Post town: Huddersfield
- Postcode district: HD1
- Dialling code: 01484
- Police: West Yorkshire
- Fire: West Yorkshire
- Ambulance: Yorkshire
- UK Parliament: Huddersfield

Edgerton is a suburb of the town of Huddersfield in West Yorkshire, England. The suburb is located along the A629 road, also known as Edgerton Road, from Huddersfield to Halifax. It is some 1 mile (1.6 km) west of the town centre. It is the location of many of the towns largest and most imposing houses, as well as the town's principal cemetery.

Although the place name has been traced back to the 14th century, Edgerton started its development in the early 19th century, when three substantial Georgian houses were built in the area. One of these houses, Edgerton Hill, survives today as the town's Ukrainian Club. By 1896, Huddersfield Corporation Tramways had built one of its pioneering steam tram lines through Edgerton. This was succeeded in turn by electric trams, trolley buses and motor buses.

Politically, Edgerton forms part of the Greenhead ward of the metropolitan borough of Kirklees and is within the Huddersfield parliamentary constituency. It is bordered to the north by the suburb of Birkby, to the east by the town centre, to the west by Lindley and to the south by Marsh.

== Gallery ==
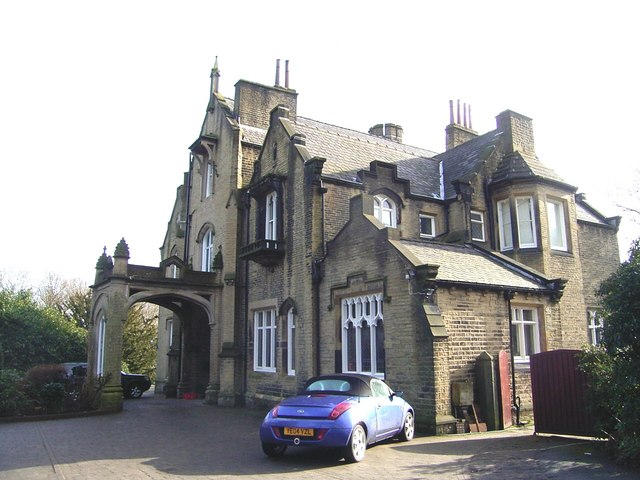
Lunnclough Hall, one of the many mansions in Edgerton

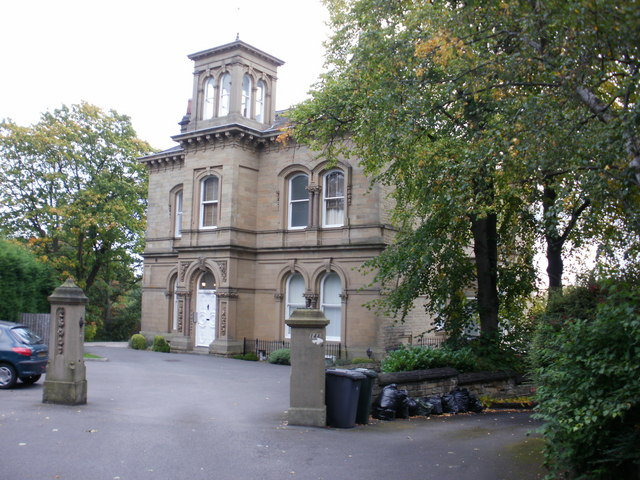
Bremen House is another of the area's listed buildings

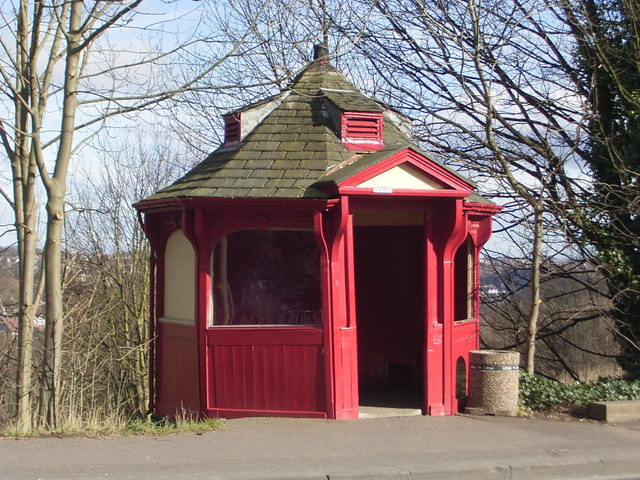
A shelter that dates back to the town's steam trams

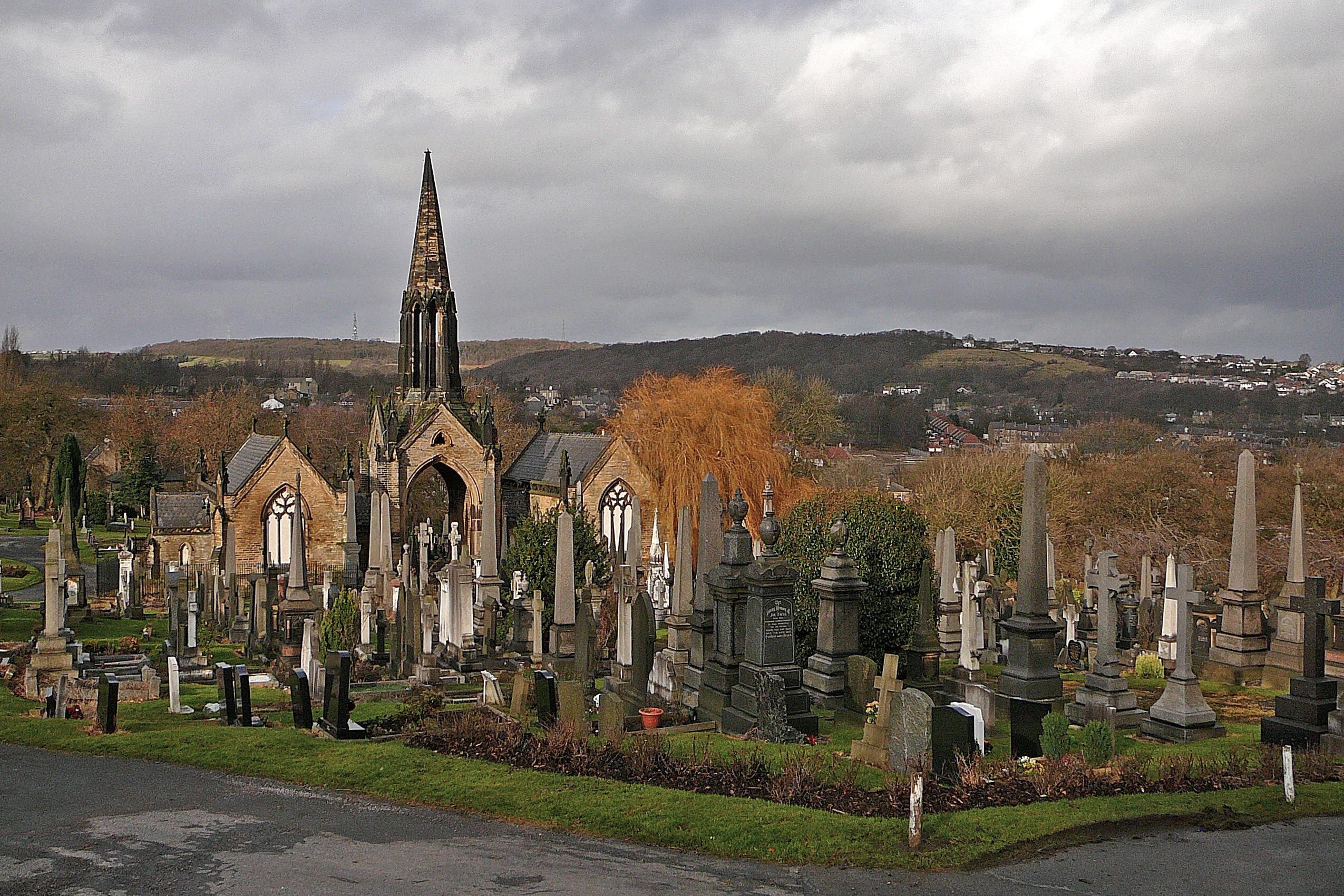
Edgerton Cemetery, with Cowcliffe behind

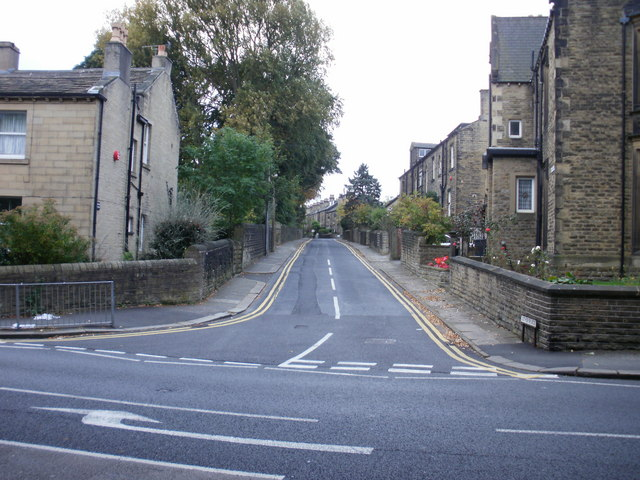
Luther Place, just off Edgerton Road

== See also ==
- Listed buildings in Huddersfield (Greenhead Ward)
