= Listed buildings in Huddersfield (Greenhead Ward) =

Greenhead is a ward of Huddersfield in the metropolitan borough of Kirklees, West Yorkshire, England. It contains 258 listed buildings that are recorded in the National Heritage List for England. Of these, four are listed at Grade II*, the middle of the three grades, and the others are at Grade II, the lowest grade. The ward is to the west and north of the centre of town of Huddersfield, it is mainly residential, and includes the districts and suburbs of Birkby, Edgerton, Fartown, Gledholt, Highfields, Hillhouse, Longwood, Marsh, Paddock, and Thornton Lodge.

Most of the listed buildings are houses and associated structures, and these include many large houses along and near to the A629 road, which contains New North Road, Edgerton Road, and Halifax Road. In the ward are Greenhead Park and Edgerton Cemetery, and these contain listed buildings. The other listed buildings include churches and items in churchyards, an aqueduct and a lock on the Huddersfield Narrow Canal, a bridge over the River Colne, a viaduct, bridges and chutes associated with the railway, a milestone, a public house, mill buildings, a former tram shelter, a school, war memorials, and a telephone kiosk.

== Key ==
Grade	Criteria
II*	Particularly important buildings of more than special interest
II	Buildings of national importance and special interest

== Buildings ==
Name and location	Photograph	Date	Notes	Grade
23–27 Bay Hall, Birkby; 53.65722°N 1.78763°W		16th century	A group of three houses with a timber framed core, restored and partly encased in stone in 1895. They have stone slate roofs, Nos. 23 and 25 have two storeys and No. 27 has one, and there is a lean-to outshut at the rear with a catslide roof. Some windows have single lights, others are mullioned, and there is an oriel window containing a tripartite casement. One gable is jettied and has exposed timber framing and a finial, and another is tile-hung.	II
75–79 Birkby Hall Road, Birkby; 53.66005°N 1.79236°W	—	1719	A group of three stone houses with stone slate roofs and bargeboarded gables, three gables facing the road, and two storeys. There are some single-light windows, and the other windows are mullioned with simple hood moulds. The doorway of No. 77 has a chamfered surround and a lintel with a four-centred arch and an inscription, and the doorway of No. 79 has a flat lintel with an achievement and initials.	II
Gledholt; 53.64664°N 1.80063°W	—	1720	A large house, incorporating some medieval fabric, but dating mainly from later alterations and extensions. It is rendered, with stone gutter brackets, and a stone slate roof. There are two storeys, and an L-shaped plan, with two ranges at right angles. At the entrance is a 20th-century porch and a doorway with an initialled and dated four-centred arch. The garden front has a moulded eaves cornice, and contains a doorway with Tuscan half-columns and a segmental pediment. Along the front is a verandah. The windows vary; some are sashes, some are casements, and some are mullioned.	II
Birkby Grange, Birkby Hall Road, Birkby; 53.65985°N 1.79639°W		18th century	A stone house that has a stone slate roof with coped gables, cut kneelers, and ball finials. There are two storeys and an attic, a front of five bays, and a two-storey extension to the left with a loggia. The doorway in the centre of the main block has a moulded surround, an oblong fanlight, a pulvinated frieze, and a cornice. The windows are casements with plain surrounds. In the east gable end is a Venetian window, and the west end contains a Diocletian window.	II
7 Bay Hall, Birkby; 53.65700°N 1.78731°W	—	18th century	A roughcast house that has a stone slate roof with coped gables on cut kneelers, and two storeys. The doorway has a moulded surround and a fanlight. In both floors is a tripartite sash window, the upper floor contains a four-light mullioned window, and there is a staircase window at the rear.	II
9 Bay Hall, Birkby; 53.65699°N 1.78753°W	—	18th century	A roughcast house that has a stone slate roof with coped gables on kneelers, and two storeys. The doorway has Tuscan half-columns, an oblong fanlight and an entablature. Most of the windows are mullioned, including a six-light staircase window, and the others are sashes, one tripartite.	II
4 Wheathouse Road, Birkby; 53.65802°N 1.79079°W	—	18th century	A stone house with a stone slate roof and two storeys. The windows vary, and include casement windows with long lintels, and two two-light mullioned windows.	II
Coach house, Gledholt; 53.64689°N 1.80029°W	—	18th century	The coach house is in stone, with a band, and a hipped stone slate roof. There are two storeys and six bays, the fourth bay projecting slightly under a pediment containing an oval oculus. In this bay is a segmental-headed carriage entrance and two more oculi, and to the left is a doorway with a moulded surround and a semicircular fanlight. The other bays contain windows with round-arched heads and impost blocks.	II
4–8 Mount Road, Marsh; 53.64918°N 1.80549°W	—	18th century	A terrace of five rendered cottages, with a stone slate roof and coped gables on cut kneelers. There are two storeys, a catslide roof at the rear, and a lean-to extension. The windows are mullioned, with some mullions removed.	II
Offices, Birkby Grange; 53.65966°N 1.79674°W	—	Mid or late 18th century	The building is in stone and has a stone slate roof with coped gables. The main range has three storeys, and the entrance front is gabled with three bays. In the centre is a carriage entrance with a depressed arch, a keystone and impost blocks. The windows are sashes, and in the top floor is a loading door. The sides have four bays and contain mullioned windows. The other offices have two storeys and an L-shaped plan.	II
56 Crescent Road, Fartown; 53.66017°N 1.78951°W	—	1789	A stone house with stone gutter brackets and a stone slate roof, catslide at the rear. There are two storeys, it contains four-light mullioned windows, and a dated plaque.	II
The Old Cottage, 58 Crescent Road, Fartown; 53.66020°N 1.78941°W	—	1789 (probable)	A stone house with stone gutter brackets and a stone slate roof. There are two storeys and a rear outshut. In the upper floor are two three-light mullioned windows, and the ground floor contains a four-light mullioned window.	II
Colne Aqueduct; 53.64088°N 1.79943°W	—	1793–98	The aqueduct carries the Huddersfield Narrow Canal over the River Colne. It is in stone and consists of a single skew arch, with the east side curved. The aqueduct has a band, coping on the west side, and a parapet and a milestone on the east side.	II
Paddock Lock; 53.64125°N 1.79903°W		1794–98	This is lock No. 5E on the Huddersfield Narrow Canal. It has stone coped walls, a single wooden head gate, and double tail gates. There is a wooden footbridge, steps at the tail end, and a stone overflow weir with a cascade at the tail.	II
1 Birkby Fold, Birkby; 53.65835°N 1.79878°W	—	18th or early 19th century	A stone house at the end of a terrace, it has a stone slate roof and two storeys. There is one single-light window, and the other windows are mullioned.	II
2 Birkby Fold, Birkby; 53.65833°N 1.79887°W	—	18th or early 19th century	A stone house in a terrace, it has a stone slate roof and two storeys. The house contains two ranges of three-light mullioned windows.	II
3 Birkby Fold, Birkby; 53.65832°N 1.79895°W	—	18th or early 19th century	A stone house in a terrace, it has a stone slate roof and two storeys. The house contains two sash windows in the upper floor, and a tripartite sash window in the ground floor.	II
4 Birkby Fold, Birkby; 53.65830°N 1.79904°W	—	18th or early 19th century	A stone house at the end of a terrace, it has a stone slate roof and two storeys. The windows are mullioned.	II
5 Birkby Fold, Birkby; 53.65821°N 1.79930°W	—	18th or early 19th century	A stone house at the end of a terrace, it has a stone slate roof and two storeys. The windows are mullioned, with a two-light window in the ground floor and a three-light window in the upper floor.	II
6 Birkby Fold, Birkby; 53.65818°N 1.79926°W	—	18th or early 19th century	A stone house in a terrace, it has a stone slate roof and two storeys. The house contains three-light mullioned windows, and the doorway has a porch with an inscription.	II
7 Birkby Fold, Birkby; 53.65814°N 1.79923°W	—	18th or early 19th century	A stone house in a terrace, it has a stone slate roof and two storeys. The windows are mullioned with three lights, and contain sashes.	II
8 Birkby Fold, Birkby; 53.65811°N 1.79919°W	—	18th or early 19th century	A stone house at the end of a terrace, it has a stone slate roof and two storeys. The windows are mullioned with three lights, and contain sashes.	II
9 Birkby Fold, Birkby; 53.65808°N 1.79930°W	—	18th or early 19th century	A stone house with a stone slate roof and two storeys. There is one casement window, and the other windows are mullioned with two lights.	II
Former coach house to 75–79 Birkby Hall Road, Birkby; 53.66001°N 1.79269°W	—	18th or early 19th century	The coach house was extended to the west in the late 19th century, and has been converted for residential use. It is in stone with stone gutter brackets, a stone slate roof, and gables with bargeboards. The older part contains segmental coach house doors, and in the west part are later openings.	II
158 Birkby Hall Road, Birkby; 53.66024°N 1.79541°W	—	18th or early 19th century	A rendered stone house with a stone slate roof, catslide at the rear. There are two storeys, and the windows are mullioned.	II
75 Birkby Lodge Road, Birkby; 53.65819°N 1.79872°W	—	18th or early 19th century	A stone house with stone gutter brackets, a stone slate roof, and two storeys. The windows are mullioned, with two two-light windows in the upper floor (one mullion removed), and a three-light window in the ground floor.	II
79 Birkby Lodge Road, Birkby; 53.65838°N 1.79876°W	—	18th or early 19th century	A stone house with a stone slate roof, and two storeys. The windows are mullioned, with some lights blocked, and some mullions removed.	II
83 Birkby Lodge Road, Birkby; 53.65866°N 1.79906°W	—	18th or early 19th century	A rendered stone house with stone gutter brackets, a stone slate roof, and two storeys. There are two three-light mullioned windows in each floor.	II
60 Crescent Road, Fartown; 53.66019°N 1.78934°W	—	18th or early 19th century	A stone house with a stone slate roof and two storeys. In the ground floor is a blocked carriage arch, and the upper floor contains a three-light mullioned window.	II
62 Crescent Road, Fartown; 53.66020°N 1.78929°W	—	18th or early 19th century	A stone house with a stone slate roof and two storeys. The windows are mullioned; in the upper floor is a three-light window, and the ground floor contains a four-light window with two mullions removed.	II
64 Crescent Road, Fartown; 53.66021°N 1.78922°W	—	18th or early 19th century	The house is rendered and has a stone slate roof and two storeys. The windows are mullioned with three lights, and contain sash windows.	II
Clough Lodge, 128 Halifax Old Road; 53.66138°N 1.78715°W	—	18th or early 19th century	A stone house with red brick at the rear, modillions to the gutter in the main part, stone gutter brackets at the rear, and a stone slate roof. There are two storeys, three bays, and a rear wing. In the centre is a gabled porch, the windows are sashes, paired in the outer bays, and at the rear is a staircase window.	II
Stables, Rose Hill; 53.65949°N 1.80322°W	—	18th or early 19th century	The former stables are rendered and have a stone slate roof with coped gables. They have two storeys and an irregular plan. The front facing the road is gabled and has single-storey flanking wings, the left wing with a canted bay window. In the centre is a doorway with flanking windows under a continuous hood mould. Above are two circular windows with square hood moulds, and in the gable is a clock. Elsewhere, there are mullioned windows.	II
Holy Trinity Church, Highfields; 53.64990°N 1.79306°W		1816–19	The church, designed by Thomas Taylor in Gothic style, is in sandstone with a slate roof. It consists of a nave with a clerestory, north and south aisles, a chancel, a north organ chamber, a south vestry, a crypt under the nave, and a west tower. The tower has four stages, angle buttresses, a west doorway, clock faces, and an embattled parapet with corner pinnacles. The body of the church also has embattled parapets, and the east window has five lights.	II*
Outer gate piers, Holy Trinity Church; 53.64926°N 1.79349°W	—	1816–19 (probable)	The gate piers are at the entrance to the churchyard from Trinity Street. They are in stone and have chamfered conical caps. The gates are in cast iron.	II
123 Halifax Old Road; 53.65869°N 1.78583°W	—	Early 19th century	A shop in stone with stone gutter brackets and a stone slate roof. There are two storeys, a shop window in the ground floor, and a three-light mullioned window in the upper floor.	II
125 Halifax Old Road; 53.65874°N 1.78587°W	—	Early 19th century	A shop in stone with stone gutter brackets and a stone slate roof. There are two storeys, a shop window in the ground floor, and a three-light mullioned window in the upper floor.	II
29 Bay Hall, Birkby; 53.65734°N 1.78711°W	—	Early 19th century	A stone house with a stone slate roof. There are two storeys and three bays, and the windows are sashes.	II
31 Bay Hall, Birkby; 53.65737°N 1.78700°W	—	Early 19th century	A stone house with a stone slate roof. There are two storeys, and the windows are tripartite sashes.	II
6 Wheathouse Road, Birkby; 53.65797°N 1.79089°W	—	Early 19th century (probable)	A stone house with a stone slate roof and two storeys. In the ground floor is a four-light mullioned and transomed window, and the upper floor contains a four-light mullioned window.	II
111 Wasp Nest Road, Fartown; 53.66115°N 1.78331°W	—	Early 19th century	A stone house at the end of a terrace, with a stone slate roof and two storeys. The windows are mullioned with three lights.	II
113 Wasp Nest Road, Fartown; 53.66119°N 1.78333°W	—	Early 19th century	A stone house in a terrace, with a stone slate roof and two storeys. The windows are mullioned with three lights.	II
115 Wasp Nest Road, Fartown; 53.66124°N 1.78335°W	—	Early 19th century	A stone house in a terrace, with stone gutter brackets, a stone slate roof, and two storeys. The windows are mullioned with three lights.	II
117 Wasp Nest Road, Fartown; 53.66128°N 1.78337°W	—	Early 19th century	A stone house at the end of a terrace, with stone gutter brackets, a stone slate roof, and two storeys. The windows are mullioned with four lights.	II
6 and 8 Dingle Road and barn, Marsh; 53.64730°N 1.80546°W	—	Early 19th century	A farmhouse and barn in one range, they are in stone, and have a stone slate roof with coped gables. There are two storeys, and the windows are mullioned.	II
139 and 141 Luck Lane, Marsh; 53.64605°N 1.81272°W	—	Early 19th century	A pair of stone houses with a sill band, stone gutter brackets, and a stone slate roof, catslide to the rear, and with coped gables. There are two storeys, one range of casement windows, and the other windows are mullioned, including a twelve-light window in the upper floor.	II
66 and 68 Westbourne Road, Marsh; 53.65168°N 1.80459°W	—	Early 19th century	A pair of shops in stone, with stone gutter brackets and a stone slate roof. There are two storeys, and each shop has one bay. In the ground floor are modern shop fronts, and the upper floor contains two three-light mullioned windows.	II
The Nook, 20 Beech Street, Paddock; 53.64383°N 1.80971°W	—	Early 19th century	A stone house with stone gutter brackets, a stone slate roof, and two storeys. In the upper floor are two casement windows, and the ground floor contains a four-light mullioned window with two mullions removed.	II
63 Hilltop Road, Paddock; 53.64168°N 1.80359°W	—	Early 19th century	A stone house with a stone slate roof and two storeys. There is one casement window, and the other windows are mullioned, with a four-light window in the ground floor and two two-light windows in the upper floor. In each floor is a blocked doorway with a window inserted.	II
5 Colne Street, Thornton Lodge; 53.64196°N 1.79955°W	—	Early 19th century	A workshop in stone, with a stone slate roof and two storeys. It contains two doorways and mullioned windows.	II
Mill east of Britannia Mill; 53.64018°N 1.80989°W	—	Early 19th century	The mill is in stone, with stone gutter brackets, and a slate roof with coped gables. There are four storeys, fronts of eleven bays, and sides of three bays. In the gable ends are Venetian windows.	II
Kirke House; 53.64327°N 1.80606°W	—	1828	This was originally All Saints Church, a Commissioners' church designed by John Oates in Gothic style. The chancel was enlarged in 1878–79, and the church is now redundant and largely in ruins. It is built in sandstone, and consists of a nave, a south porch, a chancel with a south chapel, and a west tower. The tower has three stages, buttresses, clock faces, and an embattled parapet with corner pinnacles. The chancel has been converted into a house.	II
Tomb of John Oates; 53.64301°N 1.80592°W	—	1831	The tomb is in the churchyard of All Saints Church, later Kirke House, and is that of John Oates, the architect who designed the church. It is in stone, and has a hipped top, canted sides, and panelled sides.	II
Highfield Funeral Home, Trinity Road, Highfields; 53.64981°N 1.79460°W	—	Early or mid 19th century	The building is in stone with a band, a moulded eaves cornice, and a hipped stone slate roof. There are two storeys and seven bays. The doorway has a moulded surround and a segmental pediment, and the windows are sashes.	II
Trinity House, Highfields; 53.64962°N 1.79375°W		Early or mid 19th century	The building is in stone with a moulded eaves cornice and blocking course, and a hipped slate roof. There are two storeys and a basement, and 17 bays. The outer two bays and the middle five bays project, the latter under a pediment with a moulded surround and an oculus in the tympanum. There are three doorways; the outer ones have moulded surrounds, and the central doorway has Tuscan pilasters, a fanlight, a frieze with sculpted wreaths, and a moulded cornice. The windows are sashes.	II
46–52 Luck Lane, Marsh; 53.64918°N 1.81036°W	—	Early or mid 19th century	A terrace of stone houses with a sill band, stone gutter brackets, and a stone slate roof. There are two storeys, and the windows are a mix of casement windows and mullioned windows.	II
Railway bridge, Church Street; 53.64300°N 1.80862°W		1845–49	The bridge was built by the Huddersfield and Manchester Railway to carry the road over the railway. It is in gritstone, and consists of a single segmental skewed flying arch springing directly from the rock of the cutting. The bridge has an impost band, rusticated voussoirs, a carriageway band, and a parapet with rounded coping and steel handrails. The parapet ends in projecting piers.	II
Railway tunnel portals 53.64354°N 1.79821°W	—	1845–49	The portals are at the west entrance to Gledholt Tunnels. The north portal is the older of the two, the portal to the south tunnel being added in 1882–86. They are built in gritstone, and each portal has a semicircular arch with voussoirs, flanked by piers and wing walls. Above the arches is moulding and a parapet.	II
Paddock Railway Viaduct; 53.64129°N 1.79892°W		1848–49	The viaduct carries the railway over the valley of the River Colne. The central part consists of four wrought iron lattice girder trusses on stone piers with moulded bases and imposts. There are six round stone arches with bands and coping on the north side and five on the south.	II
Milestone outside 163 Trinity Street; 53.65069°N 1.79756°W		1848	This consists of a stone with a rounded top, inscribed with initials and the date.	II
Birkby Lodge, Birkby Lodge Road; 53.65797°N 1.79665°W	—	Mid 19th century	The house, which was partly remodelled and extended in 1900 by Edgar Wood, is in stone with a hipped slate roof. There are two storeys, four bays on the front with a shallow canted bay window extending to the left, and the flat-roofed extension on the right. In the third bay, steps with vase-shaped balusters and moulded handrails lead up to a porch with Tuscan pilasters. The extension contains nine small oblong windows on the front and two in the end.	II
Ellerslie, 200 Blacker Road, Edgerton; 53.65448°N 1.79757°W	—	Mid 19th century	A stone house with quoins, and a slate roof with coped gables on kneelers. There are two storeys and attics, and a front of three bays. In the left bay is a two-storey canted bay window with foliate impost bands, carved panels between the storeys, moulded cornices, and a hipped roof. In the middle bay is a gabled porch with finials and a pointed arch, flanked by pink granite colonnettes, and behind it is a three-storey tower surmounted by a deeply moulded bracketed cornice. In the right bay are two French casement windows, and the other windows are sashes, most with hood moulds.	II
Gate piers, Ellerslie; 53.65394°N 1.79688°W	—	Mid 19th century	The gate piers at the Blacker Road entrance to the house are in stone. Each pier is square at the base, rising to become octagonal, with the sides gabled, and with a pyramidal top.	II
Logde, Ellerslie; 53.65387°N 1.79715°W	—	Mid 19th century	The lodge is in stone and has a slate roof with coped gables. There are two storeys and two bays, the left bay wider and gabled. In the left bay is a canted bay window with a moulded cornice and a blocking course, and above is a paired sash window divided by a colonnette with a foliate capital. The right bay contains sash windows, the upper one in a gabled dormer. The porch is gabled and has colonnettes with foliate capitals.	II
Beechwood, Bryan Road, Edgerton; 53.65875°N 1.80702°W	—	Mid 19th century	A large house, later used for other purposes, it is in stone with angle pilasters, a sill band, a moulded eaves cornice on fluted stone brackets, a blocking course, and a hipped slate roof. There are two storeys and an attic, a front of five bays, and a canted bay on the left corner. In the centre is an Ionic porch, the capitals of the columns decorated with fruit, an entablature with a pulvinated frieze, a dentilled frieze, a blocking course, and a balcony with cast iron railings. The doorway has a semicircular fanlight, moulded voussoirs, moulded imposts, and a vermiculated keystone. The windows are sashes with moulded surrounds, those in the ground floor with moulded cornices.	II
Gate piers, Beechwood; 53.65886°N 1.80623°W	—	Mid 19th century	The gate piers at the entrance to the drive are in stone. They have a square plan, they are panelled, and have moulded caps.	II
Cleveland House, Cleveland Road, Edgerton; 53.65510°N 1.80665°W	—	Mid 19th century	A stone house with rusticated quoins, a string course, a modillion eaves cornice, a parapet with a pediment shape in the centre containing a sculpture, and a hipped slate roof. There are two storeys and three bays. In the centre is a Doric porch with a full entablature, including metopes, and above is it ornamental cresting. The doorway has a semicircular fanlight, moulded voussoirs and imposts, and a vermiculated keystone. Above the doorway is a French window with a moulded surround and a moulded cornice on gadrooned consoles. The outer bays contain two-storey canted bay windows containing sashes, with Tuscan piers and entablatures, with sculpted panels between the storeys.	II
Gate piers, Cleveland House; 53.65468°N 1.80649°W	—	Mid 19th century	The gate piers at the entrance to the drive are in stone. They have a square plan and panelled sides. On the fronts the panels have sculptures in relief, each pier has a crocketed frieze and a moulded cornice, and one pier has the remains of a torchère.	II
Sunny Bank, 2 and 4 Cleveland Road, Edgerton; 53.65454°N 1.80718°W	—	Mid 19th century	A stone house with a band, a moulded eaves cornice and blocking course, and a hipped slate roof. There are two storeys and seven bays. The two doorways have panelled pilasters, roundels in the capitals, and cornices, and the windows are sashes.	II
Mount Edgerton, 1 and 2 Edgerton Road, Edgerton; 53.65469°N 1.80266°W	—	Mid 19th century	A terrace of stone houses with a moulded eaves cornice and blocking course, and a hipped stone slate roof. There are two storeys and seven bays, the middle three bays projecting under a pediment-shaped blocking course containing a sculpted wreath, and a single-storey single-bay extension to the east. The windows are sashes, those in the ground floor with moulded surrounds and a pediment-shaped blocking course. There are two porches with Ionic columns and a full entablature.	II
2 and 4 Edgerton Road, Edgerton; 53.65331°N 1.79694°W	—	Mid 19th century	A stone house with a stone slate roof, two storeys and three bays. The central doorway has a plain surround, an oblong fanlight, and a moulded cornice, and the windows are sashes.	II
Crannum Lodge, 6 and 6A Edgerton Road, Edgerton; 53.65397°N 1.79823°W	—	Mid 19th century	A pair of stone houses with a string course, stone brackets to the eaves, a tile roof, and two storeys and attics. In the centre is a three-storey tower with a machicolated and modillioned eaves cornice. On the ground floor is a gabled porch flanked by columns with crocketed capitals. In the middle floor is an oriel window with mullioned and transomed windows, and the top floor contains a three-light window with a hood mould. At the right end is a semi-octagonal projection with a hipped roof containing two-light mullioned windows. In the bays to the left of the projection and of the tower are mullioned windows, and in the attics are dormers with finials.	II
Gate piers, 6 and 6A Edgerton Road; 53.65347°N 1.79779°W	—	Mid 19th century	The gate piers at the entrance to the drive are in stone with a square plan. They are panelled, with blind tracery, and have pyramidal caps.	II
8 Edgerton Road, Edgerton; 53.65386°N 1.79836°W	—	Mid 19th century	A stone house with eaves brackets, and a tile roof with crow-stepped gables on moulded kneelers. There are two storeys and attics, and a front of three bays, the middle bay projecting under a gable. This bay contains a gabled porch, over which is a mullioned and transomed oriel window, and above that is a sash window with a trefoiled arch. In the left bay over the ground floor windows is a trefoil parapet, and in the upper floor of the right bay is a three-arched arcade. The garden front contains a canted bay window.	II
Gate piers, 8 Edgerton Road; 53.65361°N 1.79827°W	—	Mid 19th century	The gate piers at the entrance to the drive are in stone with a square plan. They are panelled, with blind tracery, and have pyramidal caps.	II
Clyde House, 10 Edgerton Road, Edgerton; 53.65397°N 1.79876°W		Mid 19th century	A stone house with rusticated quoins, a moulded and modillioned eaves cornice, and a balustraded parapet with urn finials. There are two storeys and five bays. In the outer bays are canted bay windows, with Tuscan piers, dentilled entablatures in the ground floor, and moulded window surrounds in the upper floor. In the centre is a tripartite sash window with panelled pilasters, and a dentilled cornice on scrolled consoles. Flanking this are doorways with chamfered surrounds, panelled pilasters, segment-headed fanlights with elaborate keystones, and triangular dentilled pediments on scrolled consoles. The upper floor contains sash windows with moulded surrounds.	II
Gate piers, 10 and 12 Edgerton Road; 53.65393°N 1.79902°W	—	Mid 19th century	There is a pair of gate piers at the entrance to both gardens, and these are linked by a dwarf stone wall with moulded coping. Each pier has a square section, panels decorated with swags of fruit and flowers in relief, at the top is a segmental pediment on each face, with carving in the tympani, and an urn finial.	II
Gate piers, 16 Edgerton Road; 53.65429°N 1.79959°W	—	Mid 19th century	The gate piers are in stone. The pair flanking the entrance are chamfered, they have panels with carved swags of fruit and flowers in relief, and on the top are ogee caps and urn finials. A dwarf wall joins them to a third pier that has an elaborate torchère.	II
17 Edgerton Road, Edgerton; 53.65462°N 1.80202°W	—	Mid 19th century	A stone house with quoins, an embattled parapet, and a slate roof. There are two storeys and an attic, and three bays, the left bay wider, projecting, and gabled. The left bay contains a two-storey canted bay window, the lights with pointed heads, and above is a single-light attic window. The doorway has a fanlight with a pointed head, and the windows in the right two bays are mullioned with two lights and hood moulds.	II
Carnassarie and Hazel Grove, 18 and 20 Edgerton Road, Edgerton; 53.65527°N 1.80209°W	—	Mid 19th century	A pair of stone houses with rusticated angle pilasters, a modillioned eaves cornice, a blocking course, and a hipped slate roof. There are two storeys, and the two houses are symmetrical around one central bay. The next two bays each project forward, and the main block of three bays, which is segmentally-bowed, projects further, with the outermost bay recessed. In the central bay is a doorway with a pediment on a moulded cornice, and the middle bay of each bowed section contains a doorway with Tuscan pilasters, a full entablature, and cornices with pendants. The windows are sashes, some tripartite.	II
Gate piers, 18 and 20 Edgerton Road; 53.65490°N 1.80225°W	—	Mid 19th century	There are two piers flanking the entrance to the drive, linked to similar end piers by dwarf stone walls with chamfered coping. Each pier has a square section, a deeply moulded cornice, and a cap consisting of a semicircular acroteria each with incised geometric ornament.	II
19 and 21 Edgerton Road; 53.65476°N 1.80384°W	—	Mid 19th century	A pair of stone houses that have slate roofs, and two storeys. There are four bays, the outer bays projecting under gables with bargeboards. In the ground floor of each is a canted bay window with a moulded cornice and an embattled parapet, and in the upper floor is a sash window with a hood mould. The inner bays have coped gables on kneelers, with stone finials, and contain mullioned and transomed cross windows with hood moulds.	II
Edgerton Villa, 24 Edgerton Road, Edgerton; 53.65517°N 1.80280°W	—	Mid 19th century	A stone house with rusticated quoins, a moulded eaves cornice and blocking course, and a slate roof with coped gables. There are two storeys and three bays. In the centre is a doorway with Tuscan pilasters, a full entablature and a blocking course. To the left is a canted bay window with a moulded cornice, and the other windows are sashes.	II
Gate piers, 24 Edgerton Road; 53.65501°N 1.80284°W	—	Mid 19th century	The gate piers at the entrance to the drive are in stone and have a square plan. They are panelled and have moulded cornices.	II
Edgerton Hill, Edgerton Road, Edgerton; 53.65389°N 1.80112°W	—	Mid 19th century	A stone house with a moulded eaves cornice and blocking course, and a hipped stone slate roof. There are three storeys, and a south front of three bays. On this front is a porch with Ionic columns, a full entablature, and an open pediment, in the sides are round-headed windows with moulded imposts, voussoirs and keystones, and the double doors have a semicircular fanlight. The windows are sash windows, and in the east front is a two-storey semicircular bay window.	II
Willow Bank, 1 Halifax Road, Edgerton; 53.65542°N 1.80558°W	—	Mid 19th century	A stone house with raised quoins, embattled parapets, and a slate roof with coped gables, cut kneelers, and finials. There are two storeys and attics, and four bays. The windows are mullioned with hood moulds, some with transoms, and the lights have various shaped heads. The ground floor of the first two bay projects, and has a balustrade with pierced quatrefoils, and a gargoyle. In the second bay is a porch with a moulded and cusped arch, and flanked by paired columns. The third bay is gabled and contains an oblong bay window, and in the attic are two gabled dormers. At the west end is a tower, square at the base, octagonal in the upper part, with lancet windows and an embattled parapet.	II
Archway to garden, 1 Halifax Road; 53.65551°N 1.80500°W	—	Mid 19th century	The archway, now blocked, is in stone, and consists of a chamfered four-centred arch. It has an embattled parapet and is flanked by embattled turrets.	II
Gate piers, 1 Halifax Road; 53.65586°N 1.80611°W	—	Mid 19th century	The gate piers flanking the entrance to the drive are in stone. They have moulded plinths, and sunk panels with trefoiled heads and trilobe tracery. On one pier is a cast iron finial decorated with mythological beasts, globes and crowns.	II
Retaining wall, 1 Halifax Road; 53.65547°N 1.80541°W	—	Mid 19th century	The retaining wall in front of the house is in stone and has an embattled parapet. At the ends are polygonal embattled piers surmounted by wrought iron torchères.	II
Colthouse and Glenwood, 2 and 2A Halifax Road, Edgerton; 53.65569°N 1.80465°W	—	Mid 19th century	Stone houses with a sill band, they have a moulded and modillioned eaves cornice, and a hipped stone slate roof. There are two storeys, four bays, and a two-storey canted bay window on the right. The entrance is in the right return, and has double doors with Tuscan pilasters, a full entablature, and a blocking course. The windows are sashes with moulded surrounds.	II
Gate piers, 2 Halifax Road; 53.65546°N 1.80480°W	—	Mid 19th century	The gate piers at the entrance to the drive are in stone and have a square plan. They are panelled and have pyramidal caps. The gates are in cast iron and have elaborate foliage patterns.	II
3 Halifax Road, Edgerton; 53.65585°N 1.80622°W		Mid 19th century	Originally the lodge to Willow Bank, it is in stone, and has a slate roof with coped gables on cut kneelers, and finials. There is one storey and an attic, with a gabled porch on the front facing the drive. On the front facing the road is a canted bay window, and above it is a two-light mullioned window.	II
4A and 4B Halifax Road, Edgerton; 53.65733°N 1.80778°W	—	Mid 19th century	A stone house that has a slate roof with coped gables on kneelers. There are two storeys and attics, and a front of four bays. The left bay is wider, projecting and gabled, and contains a canted bay window with a hipped roof, and there is a four-light mullioned window above. In the next bay is a gabled porch, and the upper floor of the bay to the right of this is corbelled out and rises to an attic dormer. In the upper floor of the right bay is a canted oriel window with a hipped roof, and there are two small lights in the attic.	II
Gate piers, 4A and 4B Halifax Road; 53.65694°N 1.80782°W	—	Mid 19th century	The gate piers at the entrance to the drive are in stone. They have a square plan, they are chamfered, and have pyramidal caps.	II
Hungerford House, 5 Halifax Road, Edgerton; 53.65578°N 1.80678°W	—	Mid 19th century	A stone house with corner pilasters, a band, a moulded and bracketed eaves cornice, and a hipped slate roof. There are two storeys, three bays, and an extension to the south. The porch has Tuscan columns and a full entablature, and the doorway has a semicircular fanlight, and moulded imposts and voussoirs. The windows are sashes with moulded surrounds, in the ground floor with moulded cornices, and there is a canted bay window.	II
Gate piers, 5 Halifax Road; 53.65605°N 1.80656°W	—	Mid 19th century	The gate piers at the entrance to the drive are in stone and have a square plan. They are panelled, and have pointed caps.	II
6 Halifax Road, Edgerton; 53.65732°N 1.80833°W	—	Mid 19th century	Originally the lodge to The Grange, it is in stone, and has a slate roof with ornamental ridge tiles, and gables with wavy pierced bargeboards and a finial. There is one storey and an attic, and a gabled doorway that has an arched and cusped fanlight. The windows are mullioned and transomed cross windows with hood moulds.	II
Gate piers, 6 Halifax Road; 53.65731°N 1.80850°W	—	Mid 19th century	The gate piers at the entrance to the drive are in stone and have a square plan. They are chamfered, with sunk roundels on the front, and they have geometrically shaped tops.	II
Gate piers, 7 Halifax Road; 53.65666°N 1.80767°W	—	Mid 19th century	The gate piers at the entrance to the drive are in stone and have a square plan. They contain blind traceried panels, and at the top are deep cornices and ball finials.	II
Lamp post, 7 Halifax Road; 53.65648°N 1.80871°W	—	Mid 19th century	The lamp post is in the garden of the house and is in cast iron. It has a gadrooned base, a bulbous fluted stem, an elaborate cross bar, and an octagonal lamp with ornamental cresting.	II
Ash Leigh, 9 Halifax Road, Edgerton; 53.65688°N 1.80884°W	—	Mid 19th century	A stone house with rusticated quoins, a moulded and bracketed eaves cornice, a blocking course pedimented in the centre with a wreath, and a hipped slate roof. There are two storeys and three bays. In the centre is a porch with Ionic columns, a full entablature and a blocking course, and a doorway with an oblong fanlight. To the left is a canted bay window, and to the right is a tripartite sash window, both with Tuscan piers and full entablatures. The upper floor contains sash windows with moulded surrounds.	II
Gate piers, 9 Halifax Road; 53.65703°N 1.80823°W	—	Mid 19th century	The gate piers at the entrance to the drive are in stone. They are panelled, and each has a moulded cornice.	II
Lamp post, 9 Halifax Road; 53.65690°N 1.80863°W	—	Mid 19th century	The lamp post is in the garden of the house and is in cast iron with a moulded stone plinth. It is fluted, and has a moulded base and cross bar, and a globe light.	II
Trafford House, 11 Halifax Road, Edgerton; 53.65702°N 1.80900°W	—	Mid 19th century	A stone house with rusticated quoins, a bracketed and moulded eaves cornice, a blocking course, partly pedimented and containing a sculpted wreath, and a hipped slate roof. There are two storeys and four bays. The porch has Ionic columns, a full entablature and a blocking course, and to the right is a canted bay window with Tuscan piers and a full entablature. The windows are sashes with moulded surrounds, those in the ground floor with Tuscan piers and entablatures.	II
Oakley House, 1 Hungerford Road, Edgerton; 53.65591°N 1.80712°W	—	Mid 19th century	A stone house on a plinth, with corner buttresses, string courses, and a slate roof with coped gables and ornamental cresting. There are two storeys and attics, and an irregular plan. The doorway has a pointed arch and a hood mould, and the windows are casements with flat lintels and chamfered relieving arches. On the garden front is a shallow two-storey oblong bay window with a hipped tile roof.	II
Gate piers, 1 Hungerford Road; 53.65600°N 1.80749°W	—	Mid 19th century	The gate piers flanking the entrance to the drive are in stone. They have a square plan, and each pier has a gabled cap with blind decoration.	II
Oakwood, 2 Hungerford Road, Edgerton; 53.65611°N 1.80822°W	—	Mid 19th century	A stone house with string courses, a bracketed eaves cornice, and a hipped slate roof. There are two storeys and a main front of four bays, the left two bays projecting. The porch in the angle has nine pink granite columns with an openwork balustrade, moulded voussoirs, carved keystones and a dentilled and modillioned cornice. Steps with quadrant walls carrying gadrooned urns lead up to the doorway that has a moulded surround, and colonnettes with foliage capitals. The windows are round-arched sashes, paired in the upper floor with colonnettes, and single in the ground floor with dentilled and modillioned cornices. The north front has three bays, and contains a canted bay window.	II
Gate piers, 2 Hungerford Road; 53.65601°N 1.80780°W	—	Mid 19th century	There are two pairs of gate piers. They are in stone, with a square plan, chamfered corners, and moulded conical tops.	II
Bryancliffe, 3 Hungerford Road, Edgerton; 53.65546°N 1.80781°W	—	Mid 19th century	A stone house with quoins, a sill band, a moulded modillioned eaves cornice, a blocking course, and a hipped slate roof. There are two storeys and five bays, the middle bay projecting slightly. The central porch has Ionic columns with carved fruit on the capitals, a full entablature and a blocking course, and the doorway has a semicircular fanlight, moulded imposts and voussoirs, and a vermiculated keystone. The windows are sashes in moulded surrounds, those in the ground floor with segmental dentilled pediments. In the garden front is a canted bay window with Tuscan piers.	II
Gate piers, 3 Hungerford Road; 53.65575°N 1.80846°W	—	Mid 19th century	The gate piers at the entrance to the drive are in stone and have a square plan. They are panelled, and have blocking courses, and a band of foliage carving under moulding cornices. Flanking the gate piers are quadrant walls.	II
Lamp post, 3 Hungerford Road; 53.65550°N 1.80823°W	—	Mid 19th century	The lamp post by the drive in the garden is in cast iron. It has an elaborate moulded base and capital, a fluted stem, and an octagonal glass lamp.	II
Somervill, 4 Hungerford Road, Edgerton; 53.65590°N 1.80892°W	—	Mid 19th century	A stone house with a moulded string course, a bracketed eaves cornice, and a hipped slate roof. There are two storeys and a front of three bays. The left bay projects, and has a coped gable and a finial. In the ground floor is a canted bay window with an openwork parapet and a moulded cornice. The upper floor contains a Venetian window with a moulded surround and sculpted cresting. Steps flanked by quadrant walls with gadrooned urns lead up to a porch in the middle bay. This has four columns and a semicircular arch which has a keystone carved with a mask in relief, and foliage sculpting in the spandrels, and a semicircular pediment with foliage in the tympanum. In the upper floor is a round-arched sash window. The right bay contains a Venetian window in the ground floor and a sash window above.	II
Gate piers, 4 Hungerford Road; 53.65576°N 1.80871°W	—	Mid 19th century	The gate piers at the entrance to the drive are in stone and have a square plan. They have round-headed panels, bracketed cornices, and at the top are semicircular panels.	II
2, 4, 6 and 6A Imperial Road, Edgerton; 53.65431°N 1.80212°W	—	Mid 19th century	A terrace of four stone houses with a moulded eaves cornice and a slate roof with coped gables. There are two storeys and eight bays. In the left bay is a two-storey canted bay window and the right bay contains a two-storey oblong bay window with tripartite sash windows. The other windows are single-light sashes, and the doorways have Tuscan pilasters, fanlights, full entablatures and blocking courses.	II
Gate and gate piers, 2 and 2A Kaffir Road; 53.65626°N 1.80466°W	—	Mid 19th century	The gate piers at the entrance to the drive are in stone, they have a square plan and are chamfered. The piers contain panels with pointed heads, and have moulded caps. Flanking the piers are walls, each containing three blind four-centred arches.	II
Gate piers, 4 Kaffir Road; 53.65632°N 1.80479°W	—	Mid 19th century	The gate piers at the entrance to the drive are in stone. They have a square plan, they are chamfered, and have moulded cornices.	II
6A Kaffir Road, Edgerton; 53.65636°N 1.80379°W	—	Mid 19th century	A stone cottage that has a slate roof with coped gables and ball finials. There is one storey and a basement, and three bays. Steps lead up to a central porch which has a pointed doorway. In the outer bays are casement windows, and the right return is a canted bay window.	II
Gate piers, 6 Kaffir Road; 53.65643°N 1.80498°W	—	Mid 19th century	The gate piers at the entrance to the drive are in stone. They have a square plan, they are chamfered, and have moulded pyramidal caps.	II
Gate piers, 8 Kaffir Road; 53.65647°N 1.80525°W	—	Mid 19th century	The gate piers at the entrance to the drive are in stone. They are cylindrical and have moulded caps and ball finials.	II
Gate piers, 10 Kaffir Road; 53.65653°N 1.80542°W	—	Mid 19th century	The gate piers at the entrance to the drive are in stone. They have a square section, they are chamfered, and have moulded caps.	II
Hollinhurst, 12 Kaffir Road, Edgerton; 53.65655°N 1.80429°W	—	Mid 19th century	A stone house with a band, a modillion eaves cornice, and a hipped slate roof. There are two storeys and attics, and three bays. In the centre is a Tuscan porch with a full entablature and a blocking course, and the round-arched doorway has a moulded surround and a keystone. The windows are sashes, those in the ground floor with moulded cornices.	II
Gate piers, 12 Kaffir Road; 53.65673°N 1.80607°W	—	Mid 19th century	The gate piers at the entrance to the drive are in stone. They have a square section, they are chamfered, and have moulded caps.	II
Holmwood, 14 Kaffir Road, Edgerton; 53.65658°N 1.80447°W	—	Mid 19th century	A stone house with a sill band, a modillion eaves cornice, and a hipped slate roof. There are two storeys and attics, and five bays. Three steps lead up to a central Tuscan porch with a full entablature and a blocking course, and the round-arched doorway has a moulded surround and a keystone. The windows are sashes, in the ground floor they have moulded cornices, and the middle window in the upper floor has a moulded surround.	II
Woodlands, 16 Kaffir Road, Edgerton; 53.65670°N 1.80482°W	—	Mid 19th century	A stone house with a sill band, bracketed eaves, and a slate roof. There are two storeys and attics, and the windows are round-arched or segmental-arched sashes with various surrounds. The west bay projects and is gabled, and in the ground floor is an oblong bay window with Tuscan piers, a moulded cornice and blocking course. In the angle between the bays is a three-storey tower with a bracketed eaves cornice and a hipped tile roof with a weathervane.	II
Brantwood, 20 and 24 Kaffir Road, Edgerton; 53.65687°N 1.80570°W	—	Mid 19th century	A stone house with decorative eaves, and a slate roof with gables and ornamental bargeboards. There are two storeys and attics, and the windows are bipartite and tripartite sashes with trefoil heads. On the house are two two-storey canted bay windows with hipped roofs. There are two gabled porches with ornate bargeboards, trefoiled arches and columns with foliate capitals, and the doors have trefoil fanlights.	II
Roseneath, 1 Luther Place, Edgerton; 53.65458°N 1.80198°W	—	Mid 19th century	A stone house on a corner site that has a slate roof with coped gables on kneelers. There are two storeys and an attic. On the front facing Edgerton Road is a two-storey canted bay window, the lights with pointed heads, blind traceried panels between the storeys, and a coved cornice. In the attic is a sash window with a hood mould. The doorway is on the Luther Place front, and this also contains a gabled wing and mullioned windows with hood moulds.	II
2 Luther Place, Edgerton; 53.65458°N 1.80163°W	—	Mid 19th century	A stone house with stone consoles to the eaves, and a stone slate roof with coped gables. There are two storeys, a double-depth plan, and a symmetrical front of three bays. The central doorway has an oblong fanlight, and the windows are sashes.	II
Two pairs of gate piers, 4 Murray Road, Edgerton; 53.65594°N 1.79656°W	—	Mid 19th century	The gate piers at the two entrances to the grounds of the house are in stone. They have trefoil-headed panels, gabled tops, and crocketed finials.	II
Burleigh House and Elm Crest, 1 and 2 Queens Road, Edgerton; 53.65456°N 1.79972°W	—	Mid 19th century	A pair of semi-detached houses in stone with a slate roof, gables and ornamental bargeboards. There are two storeys, attics and basements, and a front of three bays. In the centre is a porch with gables on three sides and cusped arches, and in the upper floor is a sash window with a cusped arch. The left bay contains a multi-storey canted bay window, in the attic is a lancet window, and in the right bay are sash windows.	II
Sedgefield, 9 Queens Road, Edgerton; 53.65514°N 1.79792°W	—	Mid 19th century	A stone house that has a slate roof with coped gables, two storeys and attics. On the front are two canted bay windows, one with a hipped roof, and the other with an embattled parapet. The left bay is recessed and gabled, and in the angle is a two-storey porch with an arched doorway. The windows are sashes, some with hood moulds.	II
Gate piers, 9 Queens Road; 53.65495°N 1.79809°W	—	Mid 19th century	The gate piers at the entrance to the drive are in stone. They have a square plan and pyramidal caps.	II
5 and 7 Regent Road, Edgerton; 53.65368°N 1.80262°W	—	Mid 19th century	A pair of mirror image houses in stone with a sill band, a moulded eaves cornice and blocking course, and a hipped slate roof. There are two storeys and four bays. The doorways in the central bays each has a semicircular fanlight, three-quarter columns, a moulded cornice on ornamental brackets, and a blocking course. Each house has a canted bay window in the ground floor and sash windows with moulded surrounds above.	II
9 Regent Road, Edgerton; 53.65362°N 1.80290°W	—	Mid 19th century	A stone house with a band, stone brackets to the eaves, and a slate roof. There are two storeys and attics, and three bays, the outer bays gabled with finials. In the middle bay is a porch with a moulded cornice, and a doorway with a moulded surround, a fanlight, and an ornamental hood mould, and above it is a single-light window with a moulded surround. The left bay contains paired sash windows, those in the ground floor with round arched heads, moulded voussoirs and imposts, and a pier with a Romanesque capital. Above are two roundels, a window, and in the gable is an oculus. The right bay projects slightly, and contains a canted bay window with a moulded cornice, above it is a paired sash window in a segmental-headed frame, and in the attic is a round-arched sash window.	II
Gate piers, 9 Regent Road; 53.65354°N 1.80291°W	—	Mid 19th century	In front of the house are three gate piers linked to the house by dwarf walls. The piers are in stone with a square plan, and have incised panels, friezes with roundels, and pyramidal caps.	II
3 Thornhill Road, Edgerton (Ravensdean); 53.65723°N 1.80943°W	—	Mid 19th century	A stone house with a modillion eaves cornice and a slate roof. There are two storeys, and an entrance front of three bays, with a tower in the middle bay. The tower has three storeys, rusticated quoins in the lower two storeys and pilasters above, and a pyramidal roof. The ground floor contains a doorway with a semicircular fanlight, foliate impost blocks, and vermiculated voussoirs. In the middle floor is a window that has a balcony on gadrooned consoles, and the top floor contains a window with an apron containing a rosette. and an entablature. The other windows on the front are sashes. The garden front has two bays, the west bay gabled and containing a canted bay window.	II
Gate piers to 12 Thornhill Road; 53.65608°N 1.81089°W	—	Mid 19th century	The gate piers flanking the entrance to the drive are in stone. They have a square section, they are chamfered, and each has a geometrically shaped top.	II
121 Halifax Old Road; 53.65859°N 1.78577°W		Mid 19th century	A stone building, partly demolished, with paired stone gutter brackets, a stone slate roof, and two storeys. It contains an entrance that has a depressed carriage arch with moulded voussoirs, and imposts, above it is a sash window, and to the right is a blocked doorway with three-quarter Tuscan columns, an entablature, and a blocking course.	II
5–17 Clare Hill, Highfields; 53.65250°N 1.78498°W		Mid 19th century	A terrace of stone houses with a moulded eaves cornice and a slate roof. There are two storeys, and each house has two bays. The windows are sashes, and each doorway has a moulded surround, an oblong fanlight, and a cornice.	II
140 Fitzwilliam Street, Highfields; 53.64884°N 1.79179°W	—	Mid 19th century	A stone house on a corner site, with a moulded eaves cornice and a hipped slate roof. There are two storeys and a basement, two bays on each front, and a curved corner between. Steps lead up to the doorway that has Tuscan pilasters and a full entablature, and the windows are sashes. Cast iron railings enclose the basement area, and flank the steps.	II
142 Fitzwilliam Street, Highfields; 53.64884°N 1.79189°W	—	Mid 19th century	A stone house in a row, with a moulded eaves cornice and a slate roof. There are two storeys and a basement, and two bays. Five steps lead up to the doorway that has Tuscan pilasters and a full entablature, and the windows are sashes. Cast iron railings enclose the basement area, and flank the steps.	II
144 Fitzwilliam Street, Highfields; 53.64882°N 1.79200°W	—	Mid 19th century	A stone house at the end of a row, with a moulded eaves cornice and a hipped slate roof. There are two storeys and two bays. The doorway has Tuscan pilasters and a full entablature, and the windows are sashes. To the right of the doorway is a round-arched passage entry converted into a window, with moulded imposts and voussoirs.	II
Claremont Cottage, 69 New North Road, Highfields; 53.65098°N 1.79288°W	—	Mid 19th century	A stone house that has a slate roof with coped gables on kneelers, bargeboards, and finials. There are two storeys, and three stepped gabled bays. One of the windows has a single light, and the others are mullioned, some with hood moulds. In the left bay is a canted bay window, and the middle bay contains a doorway with a hood mould.	II
72 New North Road, Highfields; 53.65154°N 1.79276°W	—	Mid 19th century	A stone house with a dentilled frieze and cornice, a moulded eaves cornice on paired brackets, and a hipped slate roof. There are two storeys and a symmetrical front of three bays. In the centre is a porch with square Tuscan columns, an entablature and a parapet with circles in relief. Flanking the porch are segmental bay windows with Tuscan piers, an entablature, and a parapet with circles in relief. The upper floor contains round-arched sash windows, paired in the outer bays, with moulded sills, imposts, voussoirs, and keystones.	II
Wall to 72 New North Road; 53.65147°N 1.79289°W	—	Mid 19th century	Extending along the front of the grounds is a dwarf coped stone wall pierced by circles with plain raised frames. The wall contains two pairs of gate piers and an end pier, each of which is panelled and has a cornice and a pyramidal cap.	II
73 New North Road, Highfields; 53.65110°N 1.79283°W	—	Mid 19th century	A stone house that has a tile roof, and gables with Gothic bargeboards. There are two storeys and an attic, and a gabled front of one bay. In the ground floor is a canted bay window with a blind traceried parapet, the upper floor contains a three-light mullioned window with a stepped hood mould, and there is a small attic window. In the right return is an arched porch, with an oriel window above, and a mullioned and transomed window.	II
Lyndhurst, 74 and 76 New North Road, Highfields; 53.65170°N 1.79297°W	—	Mid 19th century	A pair of mirror image houses in stone with a string course, deeply projecting eaves, and a slate roof. There are two storeys and four bays. The inner bays are gabled, and contain canted bay windows, with mullioned and transomed windows, and a traceried parapet with a moulded rail. In the upper floor are three-light windows in a giant relieving arch. The outer bays contain gabled porches with elaborate bargeboards and trefoiled side lights, and the doorways have four-centred arched heads.	II
Vermont, 75 New North Road, Highfields; 53.65119°N 1.79302°W	—	Mid 19th century	A stone house with a moulded eaves cornice and blocking course, and a slate roof. There are two storeys and three bays. Steps lead up to a central doorway that has Tuscan three-quarter columns, a fanlight, a cornice, and a blocking course, and above it is a sash window. To the left is a two-storey oblong bay window with tripartite windows, and to the right is a two-storey canted bay window with Tuscan piers, and both have moulded cornices between the storeys.	II
Two pairs of gate piers, 75 New North Road; 53.65127°N 1.79282°W	—	Mid 19th century	The gate piers at the two entrances to the grounds of the house are in stone. They are panelled and have cornice caps.	II
77 and 79 New North Road, Highfields; 53.65131°N 1.79319°W	—	Mid 19th century	A pair of stone houses with a moulded eaves cornice and a slate roof. There are two storeys and a symmetrical front of four bays. In the middle bays are doorways with oblong fanlights, Tuscan half-columns, cornices, and blocking courses, and the windows are sashes.	II
Gate piers, 77 and 79 New North Road; 53.65140°N 1.79307°W	—	Mid 19th century	There is a pair of gate piers at the entrance to both gardens. Each pier has a square plan, sunk panels with round-headed tops, a cornice, and a semicircular cap.	II
Temperance Hall, 78 New North Road, Highfields; 53.65182°N 1.79321°W	—	Mid 19th century	The building is in stone with rusticated corner pilasters, a moulded sill band, a moulded eaves cornice, and a blocking course with carved wreaths. There are two storeys and a symmetrical front of three bays, the middle bay projecting slightly. In the centre is an Ionic porch with a full entablature and a blocking course, and the doorway has a fanlight. Flanking the porch are canted bay windows with Tuscan piers, cornices and blocking courses, and in the upper floor are sash windows with moulded surrounds and sunk aprons.	II
Wall to 78 New North Road; 53.65172°N 1.79338°W	—	Mid 19th century	Extending along the front of the garden is a dwarf coped stone wall. This contains two cylindrical stone gate piers with cornices and segmental caps. Between the piers is a cast iron overthrow.	II
80 New North Road, Highfields; 53.65205°N 1.79363°W	—	Mid 19th century	A stone house with rusticated quoins, and a slate roof with coped gables on kneelers, and finials. Between the gables is a parapet with blind trefoil-headed arches. There are two storeys and attics, and three bays. Steps lead up the a central doorway with a four-centred arched head, a hood mould, and an embattled parapet. It is flanked by canted bay windows with embattled parapets, in the upper floor are paired sash windows with hood moulds, and the attics contain small pointed lights.	II
Wall to 80 New North Road; 53.65198°N 1.79379°W	—	Mid 19th century	Extending along the front of the garden is a stone coped wall containing sections of balustrade with vase-shaped balusters. There are five octagonal piers with pyramidal caps.	II
81 and 83 New North Road, Highfields; 53.65143°N 1.79336°W	—	Mid 19th century	A pair of stone houses that have slate roofs with coped gables on cut kneelers with gablets. There are two storeys and basements, and a symmetrical front of four bays. The middle bays are wider and gabled, and contain canted bay windows in the ground floor and basements. These have sash windows with shaped heads, decorated imposts, and moulded cornices. In the upper floor are paired sash windows with pointed heads and colonnettes between, and in the attics are quatrefoils. Steps lead up to porches in the outer bays with chamfered posts, trefoiled arches and gables, and above are trefoil-headed windows.	II
Gate piers, 81 and 83 New North Road; 53.65147°N 1.79318°W	—	Mid 19th century	The gate piers are in stone. Each pier has a square base, rising to become octagonal, and a conical cap.	II
82 and 82A New North Road, Highfields; 53.65217°N 1.79390°W	—	Mid 19th century	A pair of mirror image houses in stone, with a moulded eaves cornice and a hipped slate roof. There are two storeys and four bays. The middle two bays project, and contain four giant pilasters carrying a full entablature and a pediment. In the outer bays, steps with ornate cast iron balustrades lead up to doorways. The windows are sashes, those in the ground floor with moulded surrounds.	II
Wall to 82 New North Road; 53.65210°N 1.79402°W	—	Mid 19th century	Extending along the front of the garden is a dwarf stone coped wall. It contains three pairs of gate piers that are panelled and have pedimented caps.	II
84 New North Road, Highfields; 53.65230°N 1.79412°W		Mid 19th century	A stone house with quoins, a moulded eaves cornice, a blocking course with a central panelled die, and a hipped slate roof. There are two storeys, and a symmetrical front of three bays. The central doorway has Ionic pilasters and a full entablature, and it is flanked by canted bay windows with Tuscan piers, moulded cornices, and a blocking course with acroteria. In the upper floor are sash windows with moulded surrounds.	II
Wall to 84 New North Road; 53.65222°N 1.79424°W	—	Mid 19th century	Extending along the front of the garden is a dwarf stone coped wall. It contains five gate piers that are panelled and have cornices and pyramidal caps.	II
86 New North Road, Highfields; 53.65240°N 1.79435°W		Mid 19th century	The end house of a row of three, it is in stone with a parapet and a slate roof. There are two storeys and attics, and two bays. The right bay projects slightly, and is gabled with kneelers and a vase-shaped finial, and it contains a triangular cusped window. Below is a two-storey canted bay window with decorative panelling between the floors and an embattled parapet. In the left bay is a doorway with a four-centred arch, flanked by buttresses, and with a gable containing a trefoil, and in the upper floor is a mullioned sash window with a hood mould.	II
88 New North Road, Highfields; 53.65244°N 1.79442°W	—	Mid 19th century	A stone house in the middle of a row of three, it has an embattled parapet and a slate roof. There are two storeys and attics, and three bays. The outer bays project slightly, and are gabled with kneelers and a vase-shaped finial, and they each contain a triangular cusped window. The windows are mullioned sashes, bipartite in the upper floor and with three lights in the ground floor. They have hood moulds, and between the floors in the outer bays is decorative panelling. In the middle bay is a doorway with a four-centred arch, flanked by buttresses, and with a gable containing a trefoil.	II
89 and 91 New North Road, Highfields; 53.65200°N 1.79451°W	—	Mid 19th century	A pair of stone houses with slate roofs. There are two storeys and attics, and a symmetrical front of four bays. The outer bays are gabled, containing in the ground floor canted bay windows with segmental-headed sash windows and parapets with quatrefoils. In the upper floors are paired round-headed sash windows with hood moulds, and in the attics are dormers. The middle bays have doorways with segmental-headed fanlights, half-columns with acanthus capitals, and parapets with quatrefoils, and above are segmental-headed windows.	II
Gate piers and wall, 89 and 91 New North Road, Highfields; 53.65209°N 1.79432°W	—	Mid 19th century	Running along the front of the gardens is a dwarf stone wall containing seven stone gate piers. Each pier is chamfered, and has geometrical ornament and a moulded cap.	II
90 New North Road, Highfields; 53.65248°N 1.79451°W	—	Mid 19th century	The end house of a row of three, it is in stone with a parapet and a slate roof. There are two storeys and attics, and two bays. The left bay projects slightly, and is gabled with kneelers and a vase-shaped finial, and it contains a triangular cusped window. Below is a two-storey canted bay window with decorative panelling between the floors and an embattled parapet. In the right bay is a doorway with a four-centred arch, flanked by buttresses, and with a gable containing a trefoil, and in the upper floor is a mullioned sash window with a hood mould.	II
Wall in front of 86, 88 and 90 New North Road; 53.65240°N 1.79456°W	—	Mid 19th century	Running along the front of the gardens is a dwarf stone wall containing five pairs of stone piers with trefoil-headed panels and moulded caps.	II
92 New North Road, Highfields; 53.65277°N 1.79503°W		Mid 19th century	A stone house with quoins, a cornice over the ground floor, a moulded eaves cornice on moulded consoles, and a hipped slate roof. There are two storeys, five bays, and sash windows. The central doorway has a shouldered lintel, vermiculated voussoirs, moulded imposts, and panels to the sides. Above it is a window with a moulded cornice on consoles. In the outer bays the windows are paired. In the ground floor they have segmental heads, moulded surrounds, keystones, and cornices on consoles, and the upper floor windows are round-headed with moulded imposts and voussoirs, keystones, moulded cornices, panelled jambs, and plinths.	II
Wall to 92 New North Road; 53.65268°N 1.79514°W	—	Mid 19th century	Extending along the front of the garden is a stone wall with moulded coping, and it consists of linked moulded circles. The wall contains five panelled piers with moulded caps.	II
93 and 95 New North Road, Highfields; 53.65213°N 1.79476°W	—	Mid 19th century	A pair of stone houses with a slate roof, two storeys and attics, and a symmetrical front of five bays, the outer and middle bays gabled. The windows are sashes, in the attic they have pointed-arched heads, in the upper floor the heads are cusped, and the windows are paired in the gabled bays. In the ground floor are canted bay windows in the outer bays, with moulded cornices and parapets. In the middle bay is a three-light window with a hood mould, and flanking it are doorways with moulded pointed aches and hood moulds.	II
Gate piers, 93 and 95 New North Road; 53.65218°N 1.79447°W	—	Mid 19th century	There is a pair of gate piers at the entrance to both gardens. Each pier has a square plan and is chamfered, and has a large cap with semicircular-arched fronts containing sculpted floral ornament. On the top is a cast iron fleur-de-lys finial.	II
96 and 98 New North Road, Highfields; 53.65299°N 1.79553°W	—	Mid 19th century	A pair of stone houses with rusticated quoins, a moulded eaves cornice, and a hipped slate roof. There are two storeys and six bays, the outer bays projecting slightly. The windows are sashes, some tripartite, and in the ground floor they have moulded surrounds. The doorways have Tuscan pilasters and entablatures.	II
Gate piers and wall, 96 and 98 New North Road; 53.65287°N 1.79573°W	—	Mid 19th century	The dwarf wall along the front of the gardens is in stone with coping. The gate piers are rusticated, and have plain cornices with a fret pattern, and square caps.	II
Ivedene, 97 New North Road, Highfields; 53.65229°N 1.79506°W	—	Mid 19th century	A stone house with a slate roof. There are two storeys and attics, and three gabled bays with cast iron finials, the middle bay narrower and recessed. In the middle bay is a porch with polished granite columns, segment-headed arches, and an elaborate cast iron balustrade. The windows are sashes with hood moulds, and in the right bay is a two-storey canted bay window that has a parapet with quatrefoils.	II
Gate piers, 97 New North Road; 53.65243°N 1.79490°W	—	Mid 19th century	The gate piers at the entrance to the garden are in stone. They have a square plan, with panelled sides, moulded cornices, and conical caps with finials.	II
118 Trinity Street, Highfields; 53.64853°N 1.79167°W	—	Mid 19th century	A rendered stone house in a terrace, with a band, a moulded eaves cornice and a slate roof with a coped gable. There are two storeys and two bays. The round-arched doorway in the left bay has a moulded surround, a keystone and a moulded hood on scrolled ornamental brackets. The windows are sashes with voussoirs and keystones, in the right bay they are paired. In the upper floor they have segmental heads, and in the ground floor they have round heads, and between them is a colonnette with an acanthus capital.	II
120 Trinity Street, Highfields; 53.64856°N 1.79175°W	—	Mid 19th century	A stone house in a terrace, with paired stone gutter brackets, and a slate roof. There are two storeys and an attic, and two bays. The doorway in the left bay has a moulded cornice on ornamental brackets, the windows are sashes with moulded surrounds, and there is a gabled dormer.	II
122 and 124 Trinity Street, Highfields; 53.64880°N 1.79231°W	—	Mid 19th century	A pair of stone houses on a corner site, with a moulded eaves cornice and a hipped slate roof. There are two storeys and four bays. The two doorways each has Tuscan pilasters, a full entablature and a blocking course. The windows are sashes, and on the east front are two two-storey canted bay windows with entablatures, and Tuscan piers in the ground floor.	II
126 Trinity Street, Highfields; 53.64888°N 1.79252°W	—	Mid 19th century	A stone house with a moulded eaves cornice and a hipped slate roof. There are two storeys and four bays. The left bay contains a two-storey canted bay window with Tuscan piers, an entablature in the ground floor, a cornice to the upper floor, and fielded panels between. The windows are sashes, and there is a porch with Romanesque capitals, a full entablature, and a blocking course.	II
141–161 Trinity Street, Highfields; 53.65036°N 1.79693°W		Mid 19th century	A terrace of stone houses with a moulded eaves cornice and blocking course, and a slate roof. There are two storeys, and each house has two bays. The windows are sashes, some with moulded surrounds. There are canted bay windows in some houses, with Tuscan piers, moulded cornices and acroteria. Some houses have doorways with Tuscan pilasters and entablatures, and the others have plain surrounds and moulded cornices. There are passage entrances, most with moulded voussoirs and imposts.	II
156 Trinity Street, Highfields; 53.65029°N 1.79582°W	—	Mid 19th century	A stone house on a corner site, with a moulded eaves cornice and blocking course, and a slate roof with coped gables. There are two storeys, two bays, and a rear extension. The doorway in the left bay has Ionic pilasters, a full entablature, and a blocking course containing a wreath in relief. Above it is a sash window with a moulded surround, and in the right bay is a two-storey canted bay window with Tuscan piers, entablatures between the floors, and a blocking course containing a wreath in relief. In the extension is a Venetian window.	II
158 and 160 Trinity Street, Highfields; 53.65036°N 1.79597°W	—	Mid 19th century	A pair of stone houses with quoins, a moulded eaves cornice and blocking course, and a slate roof. There are two storeys, and four bays. The middle two bays project slightly and at the top the blocking course is pediment-shaped and contains an anthemion in relief. The doorways in the middle bays have Tuscan pilasters, full entablatures, and blocking courses, each with an acroterion in relief. The windows are sashes and in the left bay is a canted bay window.	II
162 and 164 Trinity Street, Highfields; 53.65044°N 1.79618°W	—	Mid 19th century	A pair of stone houses with quoins, a moulded eaves cornice and blocking course, and a slate roof. There are two storeys, and four bays. The middle two bays project slightly and at the top the blocking course is pediment-shaped and contains an anthemion in relief. The doorways in the middle bays have Tuscan pilasters, full entablatures, and blocking courses, each with an anthemion in relief. The windows are sashes with moulded surrounds.	II
163 Trinity Street, Highfields; 53.65064°N 1.79767°W	—	Mid 19th century	A stone house at the end of a terrace, with a parapet containing openwork over the left bay, and a slate roof. There are two storeys and attics, and two bays. In the narrow left bay, steps lead up to a doorway with a pointed fanlight containing tracery. The windows have chamfered surrounds, mullions, and ornamental tracery. In the right bay is a canted bay window with an openwork parapet and there are two gabled dormers.	II
Gate piers, 163 Trinity Street; 53.65068°N 1.79754°W	—	Mid 19th century	The gate piers at the entrance to the garden are in stone. They have a square plan, they have traceried panels, and pointed tops.	II
165 Trinity Street, Highfields; 53.65076°N 1.79805°W	—	Mid 19th century	A stone house at the end of a terrace, with a moulded eaves cornice and blocking course, and a slate roof. There are two storeys and a symmetrical front of three bays. The central doorway has Tuscan columns, an entablature and a blocking course. The window are sashes, and there are two canted bay windows, each with Tuscan piers, a moulded cornice, and a blocking course with acroteria in relief.	II
166–190 Trinity Street, Highfields; 53.65065°N 1.79674°W	—	Mid 19th century	A terrace of stone houses with a moulded eaves cornice and blocking course, and a slate roof. There are two storeys, one house has three bays, and the others have two. The windows are sashes, and some houses have canted bay windows. The doorways vary, some with moulded surrounds and moulded cornices, and others with Tuscan pilasters or half-columns, and an entablature. Most of the houses have round-arched passage entrances with voussoirs and imposts.	II
167–177 Trinity Street, Highfields; 53.65088°N 1.79837°W	—	Mid 19th century	A terrace of seven stone houses with a moulded eaves cornice and blocking course, and a slate roof. There are two storeys, each house has two bays, and the windows are sashes. The outer two houses have doorways with Tuscan columns and an entablature, and the doorways of the other houses have plain surrounds and segmental pediments. Between Nos. 171 and 173 is a segmental carriage arch with moulded imposts and voussoirs.	II
60 Bradford Road, Hillhouse; 53.65533°N 1.78199°W	—	Mid 19th century	A stone house at the end of a terrace, with a moulded eaves cornice and a slate roof. There are two storeys and two bays. The doorway has Tuscan pilasters, an entablature and a blocking course, and to the left is a passage entrance with a chamfered surround. To the right is a canted bay window with a moulded cornice and a blocking course, and in the upper floor are sash windows.	II
62 Bradford Road, Hillhouse; 53.65540°N 1.78199°W	—	Mid 19th century	A stone house in a terrace, with a moulded eaves cornice and a slate roof. There are two storeys and two bays. The doorway has Tuscan pilasters, an entablature and a blocking course, and to the left is a passage entrance with a chamfered surround. To the right is a canted bay window with a moulded cornice and a blocking course, and in the upper floor are sash windows.	II
64 Bradford Road, Hillhouse; 53.65547°N 1.78199°W	—	Mid 19th century	A stone house in a terrace, with a moulded eaves cornice and a slate roof. There are two storeys and two bays. The doorway has Tuscan pilasters, an entablature and a blocking course, and to the left is a passage entrance with a chamfered surround. To the right is a canted bay window with a moulded cornice and a blocking course, and in the upper floor are sash windows.	II
66 Bradford Road, Hillhouse; 53.65553°N 1.78199°W	—	Mid 19th century	A stone house in a terrace, with a moulded eaves cornice and a slate roof. There are two storeys and two bays. The doorway has Tuscan pilasters, an entablature and a blocking course, and to the left is a passage entrance with a chamfered surround. To the right is a canted bay window with a moulded cornice and a blocking course, and in the upper floor are sash windows.	II
68 Bradford Road, Hillhouse; 53.65559°N 1.78199°W	—	Mid 19th century	A stone house in a terrace, with a moulded eaves cornice and a slate roof. There are two storeys and two bays. The doorway has Tuscan pilasters, an entablature and a blocking course, and to the left is a passage entrance with a chamfered surround. To the right is a canted bay window with a moulded cornice and a blocking course, and in the upper floor are sash windows.	II
70 Bradford Road, Hillhouse; 53.65566°N 1.78198°W	—	Mid 19th century	A stone house in a terrace, with a moulded eaves cornice and a slate roof. There are two storeys and two bays. The doorway has Tuscan pilasters, an entablature and a blocking course, and to the left is a passage entrance with depressed arch a chamfered surround. To the right is a modern shop front, and in the upper floor are sash windows.	II
72 Bradford Road, Hillhouse; 53.65572°N 1.78197°W	—	Mid 19th century	A stone house in a terrace, with a moulded eaves cornice and a slate roof. There are two storeys and two bays. The doorway has a fanlight, Tuscan pilasters, an entablature and a blocking course, and to the left is a passage entrance with a blind semicircular fanlight, moulded voussoirs and imposts. To the right is a canted bay window with segmental-headed sash windows, moulded imposts, a moulded cornice and a blocking course, and in the upper floor are sash windows.	II
74 Bradford Road, Hillhouse; 53.65578°N 1.78196°W	—	Mid 19th century	A stone house in a terrace, with a moulded eaves cornice and a slate roof. There are two storeys and two bays. The doorway has a fanlight, Tuscan pilasters, an entablature and a blocking course, and to the left is a passage entrance with a blind semicircular fanlight, moulded voussoirs and imposts. To the right is a canted bay window with segmental-headed sash windows, moulded imposts, a moulded cornice and a blocking course, and in the upper floor are sash windows.	II
76 Bradford Road, Hillhouse; 53.65584°N 1.78195°W	—	Mid 19th century	A stone house in a terrace, with a moulded eaves cornice and a slate roof. There are two storeys and two bays. The doorway has a fanlight, Tuscan pilasters, an entablature and a blocking course, and to the right is a passage entrance with a blind semicircular fanlight, moulded voussoirs and imposts. To the left and in the upper floor are sash windows.	II
78 Bradford Road, Hillhouse; 53.65591°N 1.78193°W	—	Mid 19th century	A stone house in a terrace, with a moulded eaves cornice and a slate roof. There are two storeys and two bays. The doorway has a fanlight, Tuscan pilasters, an entablature and a blocking course, and to the left is a passage entrance with a blind semicircular fanlight, moulded voussoirs and imposts. To the right and in the upper floor are sash windows.	II
80 Bradford Road, Hillhouse; 53.65598°N 1.78194°W	—	Mid 19th century	A stone house in a terrace, with a moulded eaves cornice and a slate roof. There are two storeys and two bays. The doorway has a fanlight, Tuscan pilasters, an entablature and a blocking course, and to the left is a passage entrance with a blind semicircular fanlight, moulded voussoirs and imposts. To the right and in the upper floor are sash windows.	II
82 Bradford Road, Hillhouse; 53.65603°N 1.78193°W	—	Mid 19th century	A stone house in a terrace, with a moulded eaves cornice and a slate roof. There are two storeys and two bays. The doorway has a fanlight, Tuscan pilasters, an entablature and a blocking course, and the windows are sashes.	II
84 Bradford Road, Hillhouse; 53.65609°N 1.78192°W	—	Mid 19th century	A stone house in a terrace, with a moulded eaves cornice and a slate roof. There are two storeys and two bays. The doorway has a fanlight, Tuscan pilasters, an entablature and a blocking course, and the windows are sashes.	II
86 Bradford Road, Hillhouse; 53.65615°N 1.78190°W	—	Mid 19th century	A stone house at the end of a terrace, with a moulded eaves cornice and a slate roof. There are two storeys and a basement, and two bays. The doorway has a fanlight, Tuscan pilasters, an entablature and a blocking course, and the windows are sashes.	II
Former Church Hall, Clara Street, Hillhouse; 53.65820°N 1.78248°W	—	Mid 19th century	The former church hall of Hillhouse United Reformed Church, is in stone and has a slate roof with coped gables on moulded kneelers. There are two storeys, and the gable end faces the street. In the centre is a doorway with a chamfered surround, and the windows have two lights and cusped pointed arches with oculi in the spandrels. In the attic is a quatrefoil oculus, now blocked.	II
132 Luck Lane, Marsh; 53.64543°N 1.81344°W	—	Mid 19th century	Originally a lodge, the house is in stone, with bands, rusticated angle pilasters, and a stone slate roof with bargeboarded gables. There are two storeys, and the south front has two bays. The left bay projects under a gable, and contains a canted bay window with a moulded cornice and a parapet, and in the upper floor are paired round-headed sash windows with a colonnette between. The east front is also gabled, and contains a round-arched window with an elaborate cornice, and above it is a sculpted plaque with a moulded surround and a pedimented cornice. In the angle is a porch that has pilasters with elaborate capitals, a full entablature, and a doorway with a segmental head.	II
Royds Mount, Luck Lane, March; 53.64765°N 1.81358°W	—	Mid 19th century	A stone house that has a slate roof with coped gables on kneelers, two storeys and attics. The east front has three bays, the left bay is gabled, and contains a gabled two-storey canted bay window. Above the ground floor of this is a moulded cornice, and between the storeys is trefoil decoration. In the right bay is an oblong single-storey bay window, and the middle bay contains a gabled porch with three trefoil-headed arches on columns. In the south front is a verandah of four arched bays with a balustrade of quatrefoils. The left bay of this front contains a canted single-storey bay window with an embattled parapet, and above it is an oriel window. The windows in the house have colonnettes with foliate capitals between the lights.	II
Two lamp posts, Royds Mount; 53.64758°N 1.81331°W	—	Mid 19th century	The lamp posts stand opposite the corners of the east front of the house, and have octagonal stone plinths with chamfered tops. The stands are in cast iron, and have moulded bases, spirally fluted stems, capitals, and globe lights.	II
Marsh Liberal Club, New Hey Road, Marsh; 53.65162°N 1.81349°W	—	Mid 19th century	The building is in stone with rusticated angle pilasters, a moulded eaves cornice and blocking course, and a hipped stone slate roof. There are two storeys and three bays, the middle bay projecting under a pediment-shaped blocking course containing a sculpted wreath. In the centre is a Tuscan porch with an entablature, and the doorway has an oblong fanlight. Flanking the porch are canted bay windows with Tuscan piers and an entablature, and in the upper floor are sash windows with moulded surrounds.	II
54 and 56 Church Street, Paddock; 53.64274°N 1.80455°W	—	Mid 19th century	A pair of stone houses with a sill band, a modillion eaves cornice and a stone slate roof. There are two storeys, and the windows are sashes.	II
Westfield, 58, 58A and 58B Church Street, Paddock; 53.64276°N 1.80481°W	—	Mid 19th century	A stone house with a moulded eaves cornice and blocking course, and a slate roof. There are two storeys and three bays. The central doorway has Tuscan pilasters, an entablature, and a pediment-shaped blocking course, and the windows are sashes.	II
59 Church Street, Paddock; 53.64255°N 1.80574°W	—	Mid 19th century	A stone house in a terrace, with a sill band, stone gutter brackets, and a stone slate roof. There are two storeys and two bays. The windows are sashes, and the doorway has a fanlight with glazing bars.	II
61 Church Street, Paddock; 53.64256°N 1.80586°W	—	Mid 19th century	A stone house in a terrace, with a sill band, stone gutter brackets, and a stone slate roof. There are two storeys and two bays. The windows are sashes, and the doorway has a fanlight with glazing bars.	II
73 Church Street, Paddock; 53.64258°N 1.80594°W	—	Mid 19th century	A stone house in a terrace, with a sill band, stone gutter brackets, and a stone slate roof. There are two storeys and two bays. The windows are sashes. The doorway has a moulded surround and a fanlight with glazing bars, and to the left is a carriage entrance with a depressed arch.	II
75 Church Street, Paddock; 53.64258°N 1.80604°W	—	Mid 19th century	A stone house in a terrace, with a sill band, stone gutter brackets, and a stone slate roof. There are two storeys and two bays. The windows are sashes.	II
93–99 Church Street, Paddock; 53.64268°N 1.80672°W	—	Mid 19th century	Four stone houses in a terrace, with stone gutter brackets and a stone slate roof. There are two storeys and each house has two bays. The windows are sashes, and each house has a doorway that has fanlight with glazing bars, plain surrounds, and moulded cornices. To the left of each doorway is a passage entrance with a semicircular blocked fanlight, some converted into windows, and all with voussoirs and moulded imposts.	II
101 Church Street, Paddock; 53.64270°N 1.80688°W	—	Mid 19th century	A stone house in a terrace, with stone gutter brackets and a stone slate roof. There are two storeys and two bays. The windows are sashes, and the doorway has a fanlight with glazing bars, Tuscan pilasters, and a dentilled entablature. To the left is a passage entrance with a semicircular blocked fanlight, voussoirs and moulded imposts.	II
103 Church Street, Paddock; 53.64272°N 1.80706°W	—	Mid 19th century	A stone house in a terrace, with stone gutter brackets and a stone slate roof. There are two storeys and two bays. The windows are sashes, and the doorway has a fanlight with glazing bars, Tuscan pilasters, and a dentilled entablature.	II
105 Church Street, Paddock; 53.64273°N 1.80713°W	—	Mid 19th century	A stone house in a terrace, with stone gutter brackets and a stone slate roof. There are two storeys and two bays. The windows are sashes, and the doorway has a fanlight with glazing bars, Tuscan pilasters, and a dentilled entablature. To the left is a former passage entrance converted into a window, with a semicircular blocked fanlight, voussoirs and moulded imposts.	II
107 Church Street, Paddock; 53.64273°N 1.80724°W	—	Mid 19th century	A stone house at the end of a terrace, with a moulded eaves cornice and a stone slate roof. There are two storeys and two bays. The windows are sashes, the ground floor window with a moulded surround. The doorway has a moulded surround, and a moulded cornice on consoles.	II
26 and 28 West View, Paddock; 53.64166°N 1.80894°W	—	Mid 19th century	A stone house with a moulded eaves cornice, a blocking course, and a hipped slate roof. There are two storeys and three bays. The doorway has Tuscan half-columns, a moulded cornice and a blocking course, and the windows are sashes.	II
Wall and gate posts, Gledholt Methodist Church; 53.65153°N 1.80075°W	—	Mid 19th century	The dwarf walls that enclose the grounds of the church and school are in stone with ornamental cast iron railings. They contain three pairs of stone gate piers, with panels, moulded cornices, and pedimented caps.	II
Gates and gate piers, Royds Hall School; 53.64525°N 1.81343°W	—	Mid 19th century	The gate piers flanking the entrance to the drive are in rusticated stone, and have foliage carving in roundels and below the cornices. On the sides are buttresses, and on each pier is an elaborate cast iron torchère on grotesque legs. Outside the piers are double quadrant walls with fielded panels.	II
The Apostolic Church; 53.65058°N 1.79247°W	—	Mid 19th century	The church is in stone with rusticated quoins, a moulded eaves cornice and a blocking course, and a hipped slate roof. There are two storeys and four bays. The windows are sashes with sills on moulded brackets, two pairs have segmental heads and the others have moulded surrounds.	II
The Croppers Arms; 53.65148°N 1.80828°W		Mid 19th century	The public house is in stone with a band, stone gutter brackets, and a stone slate roof. There are two storeys and six bays. The doorway has Tuscan pilasters and an open triangular pediment on fluted brackets, and the windows are sashes.	II
St John's Church, Birkby; 53.65587°N 1.78825°W		1851–53	The church, designed by William Butterfield, is in stone with slate roofs. It consists of a nave with a clerestory, north and south aisles, southwest and northwest porches, a chancel, and a southeast steeple. The steeple has a tower with four stages, an openwork parapet, octagonal corner pinnacles, and a tall octagonal spire with three tiers of gabled lucarnes, a crocketed finial, and a weathervane. The windows contain Geometrical tracery.	II*
Wall around St John's Church, Birkby; 53.65594°N 1.78759°W	—	1851–53	Surrounding part of the churchyard is a dwarf stone wall with simple iron railings.	II
Bridge over River Colne; 53.64065°N 1.80085°W		1853	The bridge carries Birkhouse Lane over the River Colne. It is in stone, and consists of two segmental arches. The bridge has cutwaters, a band, and a parapet, and on it is an inscribed plaque.	II
Gatehouse, Edgerton Cemetery; 53.65361°N 1.79338°W		1853–55	The gatehouse at the entrance to the cemetery is in stone with a slate roof, two storeys and three bays. The left bay is gabled, and has a canted bay window with an embattled parapet in the ground floor. The middle bay contains a four-centred arch, and the right bay consists of a three-storey tower with an embattled parapet. The windows are mullioned, or mullioned and transomed with hood moulds. On each side are gateways, each with three arches, the middle arch larger, with buttresses, and at the ends are octagonal turrets with pyramidal caps.	II
Mortuary Chapel, Edgerton Cemetery; 53.65426°N 1.79424°W		1853–55	There are two chapels, now derelict, with an archway between them, in stone. The chapels have diagonal buttresses, slate roofs with parapetted gables, openwork parapets along the sides, and crocketed finials at the corners. The window tracery is Decorated in style. The archway is rib vaulted, and surmounted by an octagonal spire that has openwork with crocketed gables in the lower part.	II
Walls, Edgerton Cemetery; 53.65378°N 1.79274°W	—	c. 1853–55	Stretching along the east side of the cemetery are dwarf stone walls. They contain piers with trefoil-headed panels and moulded caps.	II
Lunnaclough Hall, 6 and 8 Kaffir Road, Edgerton; 53.65637°N 1.80339°W	—	1855	A large house extended in 1889, it is in stone and has a slate roof with coped gables. The centre part has three storeys, the outer parts have two storeys, and there is a single-storey extension to the south. The main front has three gabled bays, and in the centre is a porte-cochère with octagonal buttresses and crocketed ogee caps, and a four-centred arch on each side with pierced spandrels. The doorway has a four-centred arch, sidelights and a fanlight set in a larger four-centred arch. The windows vary; some are mullioned, some are mullioned and transomed, and some are sashes with cusped heads, and most have hood moulds.	II
Stoneleigh, Bryan Road, Edgerton; 53.65939°N 1.80637°W	—	1860	The house has been much altered and extended, including the addition of a billiard room in 1891. The house is in stone and has a tile roof with shaped gables, two storeys and attics. The windows are mullioned and transomed, most with relieving arches. The porch is gabled and has arches on the front and sides on columns with foliate capitals. Behind the porch rises a three-storey tower with a pyramidal roof, and at the rear is a conservatory.	II
Britannia Mill; 53.64005°N 1.81099°W		1861	The mill is in stone with stone gutter brackets, and a triple-pitched slate roof. There are six storeys, and fronts of 25 and six bays. Two of the bays contain loading doors, in one of which they have round-arched heads and rusticated surrounds, and at the top is a parapet containing a dated panel.	II
Hebble House, walls and gates, 84 Bradford Road, Hillhouse; 53.65500°N 1.78251°W	—	Mid to late 19th century	A stone house on a chamfered plinth, with a Welsh slate roof and sash windows. There are two storeys, and attic and cellar, and two bays, the right bay projecting and gabled. In the left bay, steps lead up to a round-arched doorway with a fanlight, an architrave with pilasters, and a cornice, and in the upper floor is a window. The right bay contains paired windows in the ground and upper floors, and a narrow window in the attic. Throughout, the capitals, keystones, consoles, and hood moulds have highly decorative carvings. In front of the house are walls, gate piers with domical finials, and iron railings and gates.	II
Fernbrook, 4 Murray Road, Edgerton; 53.65590°N 1.79619°W	—	1867	A stone house that has a slate roof with coped gables. There are two storeys and an attic, and three bays, the left bay gabled. The middle bay is narrow and recessed, and has a projecting gabled porch, flanked by paired columns with folate capitals, and there are two-arched arcades on the sides. In the right bay is a canted bay window with a moulded cornice. Elsewhere, the windows are sashes, tripartite in the ground floor of the left bay, with colonnettes; all the windows have hood moulds.	II
Bremen House, 16 Edgerton Road; 53.65443°N 1.79934°W		1868	A stone house in Italianate style, it has moulded bands, a moulded and bracketed eaves cornice, and a hipped slate roof. There are two storeys and three bays, the middle bay rising to form a three-storey tower. The doorway has columns in pink granite with foliate capitals, moulded panels, a semicircular fanlight with a keystone, moulded voussoirs, and foliage carving in the imposts and spandrels. The top floor of the tower has angle pilasters, a full entablature, and round-arched windows with moulded voussoirs, imposts and keystones. The windows are sashes, round-headed in the ground floor, and with segmental heads in the upper floor.	II
Wood Field, stable and coach house block, 17 Queens Road, Edgerton; 53.65488°N 1.79678°W	—	c. 1870	A large house in sandstone that has a slate roof with coped gables, kneelers and finials. There are two storeys, attics and a basement, single-storey projections, and an irregular plan. The porch is gabled and arched, the windows are mullioned with hood moulds, and there are gabled dormers with finials. To the north are a stable and a coach house block in similar style.	II
Gate piers, 17 Queens Road; 53.65454°N 1.79631°W	—	c. 1870	The gate piers flanking the entrance to the drive are in stone. They have a square plan, a shield on the front, and gabled tops.	II
Cote Royd, 7 Halifax Road, Edgerton; 53.65667°N 1.80869°W	—	1874	A stone house that has a slate roof with coped gables on cut kneelers with ball finials. There are two storeys and attics, and a front of three bays, the left bay gabled. The ground floor projects at the north end under a foliate parapet. The porch has a moulded pointed arch and a hood mould. The windows are modillioned sashes with chamfered surrounds and hood moulds. In the garden front are two gables, and it contains a single-storey semicircular bay window, and a two-storey canted bay window with an embattled parapet.	II
Former tram shelter 53.65474°N 1.80137°W		Late 19th century	The former tram shelter in Edgerton Road is timber framed and planked, with console-shaped brackets to the eaves, and a pyramidal slate roof with terracotta finials and flat-topped louvres. In the lower part are moulded panels, and above are depressed arches with moulded spandrels. The entrance has a shaped lintel and a pedimented gable on large consoles.	II
Wall and gate piers, Birkby Junior School; 53.65935°N 1.78427°W	—	Late 19th century	The grounds of the school are enclosed by dwarf stone walls on the northwest side. They contain three pairs of stone gate piers, each square in section at the base, cylindrical in the centre, and with pyramidal caps.	II
Rose Hill, Birkby Hall Road; 53.65923°N 1.80312°W		Late 19th century	The house is in stone and has hipped tile roofs and two storeys, and the windows are mullioned and transomed. It was partly redecorated in 1909 by Edgar Wood and J. Henry Sellars. The external part of the redecoration is a long canted mullioned and transomed window with a parapet and an idiosyncratic moulded pattern.	II*
Birkby Junior School; 53.65937°N 1.78402°W		1877	The school, which was extended in 1881–82, is in Gothic style. It is in stone and has a half-hipped slate roof, and timber framed gables on coved jetties. There is a two-storey main block and single-storey wings. By the main block is a three-storey tower with a machicolated parapet, above which is open timberwork carrying clock faces an all sides, and an octagonal slated spire. Most of the windows are casements in chamfered surrounds with mullions, some also with transoms, and some with rose windows above. In the extension, most of the windows have pointed heads.	II
Railway bridge, Hillhouse Lane; 53.65574°N 1.77941°W		1880	The bridge carries the railway over Hillhouse Lane. It is in stone and consists of a high tunnel-like bridge with a segmental arch, a keystone, impost blocks and a parapet. On the bridge is a dated panel.	II
Bandstand, Greenhead Park; 53.64835°N 1.79559°W		1883	The bandstand has a stone base, the superstructure is in timber, and the roof is slated. There is an octagonal base with five steps, a chamfered plinth, and a low balustrade. On this are eight columns carrying an octagonal roof with a cupola and an iron weathervane. The columns have Japanese-style openwork lattice and brackets.	II
Conservatory, Greenhead Park; 53.64811°N 1.79270°W		1884	The conservatory is in timber on a brick plinth, and is completely glazed. It has a hipped roof and a clerestory, also with a hipped roof, and finials. At the rear is a wing with a pitched roof.	II
Park gates and gatepiers, Marsh Fold; 53.65083°N 1.80083°W	—	1884	At the Marsh Fold entrance to Greenhead Park are four gate piers in stone on moulded plinths. The piers are chamfered, with buttresses, foliate cornices, and pyramidal caps.	II
Park gates and gatepiers, Trinity Street; 53.64849°N 1.79238°W		1884	At the Trinity Street entrance to Greenhead Park are five gate piers in stone on moulded plinths. The piers are chamfered, with buttresses, foliate cornices, and pyramidal caps.	II
Trinity Street Lodge; 53.64832°N 1.79237°W		1884	The lodge at the Trinity Street entrance to Greenhead Park is in stone, with deeply overhanging eaves, and a half-hipped slate roof, with tile cresting, gables with bargeboards, and a cast iron weathervane. There is one storey and an attic. The porch has four bulbous columns and arches, and there is a canted bay window, over which is a balcony. The other windows include a two-light mullioned window, and an attic dormer with a modillioned eaves cornice. On the chimney breast is an inscribed plaque.	II
Fountain, Greenhead Park; 53.64901°N 1.79705°W	—	1888	The drinking fountain in the centre of the park stands on four steps, and has a base with four projecting semicircular bowls. From each corner rise paired fluted Tuscan columns carrying semicircular arches with keystones, moulded voussoirs, a fluted frieze, and a moulded cornice. On the top is an ogee corona with fleur-de-lys finials.	II
Gledholt Methodist Church; 53.65167°N 1.80084°W		1889–90	The church is in stone with a hipped slate roof and two storeys. On the front are angle pilasters, a full entablature, and a balustrade with vase-shaped balusters and piers with urn finials. The front has five bays, the middle bay with paired Ionic pilasters, and at its top is a triangular pediment. The windows are sashes, in the ground floor with round-arched heads, rusticated voussoirs, and moulded keystones. To the left is a recessed bay containing a doorway with a depressed arch. On the right is a recessed four-storey tower with a balustrade, and angle turrets with niches and pediments. The top storey is octagonal, and has an octagonal lead cupola with a finial.	II
Railway Coal Chutes, Tramway, Walls and Gates; 53.65787°N 1.77876°W		1900	The structure was built by the London and North Western Railway for the Huddersfield Corporation Tramways and consists of 40 coal chutes. These are in carried in a timber framework, divided by piers of blue engineering brick with stone bands, and the chutes are in iron. The boundary walls are in stone and each has two gateways with square gate piers with pyramidal tops.	II
Azo House, Birkby Lodge Road; Cruden, Birkby Hall Road; 53.65934°N 1.79902°W	—	1903	A pair of semi-detached houses on a corner site designed by Edgar Wood, with entrances to both roads. They are in stone with slate roofs, gables and overhanging eaves, and have two storeys and attics. The windows are mullioned and transomed, and there are two two-storey canted bay windows, one with a flat top, and the other rising higher with a parapet. One doorway has a flat top on console-shaped brackets, and the other has attachments in Arts and Crafts style.	II
Boer War Memorial, Greenhead Park; 53.64848°N 1.79320°W		1905	The war memorial consists of the life-size bronze statue of a soldier in uniform standing and holding a rifle. The statue is on a pedestal of Aberdeen granite with a moulded cornice and base, on a square plinth, on a base of two steps. On the front of the pedestal and the base are bronze plaques with inscriptions and the names of those lost in the Second Boer War.	II
Former Birkby Baptist Church; 53.65929°N 1.79225°W		1910	The former Baptist church is in stone, and has a slate roof with overhanging eaves. It consists of a nave, north and south aisles, north and south transepts, an undercroft, a southwest porch with a hipped roof, and a squat northwest tower. The tower has two stages, a canted chapel on the north side, gargoyles, an embattled parapet, and a pyramidal roof with a wooden finial. Along the sides of the church are dormers, and the window tracery has Art Nouveau features. To the north of the church is a minister's house with canted bay windows and embattled parapets.	II
Wall and railings, Former Birkby Baptist Church; 53.65938°N 1.79249°W	—	c 1910	The grounds of the former church are enclosed by dwarf stone walls and regularly spaced piers with caps. Between the piers are cast iron railings, some with Arts and Crafts-style finials.	II
Fartown and Birkby war memorial 53.66193°N 1.78836°W		1921	The war memorial is in Norman Park. It consists of a tall granite pedestal with panelled sides and a cornice, on a platform of two steps. Standing on the pedestal is the life-size bronze statue of an infantry soldier with a rifle, and on the sides are plaques in black polished granite with inscriptions, and the names of those lost in the two World Wars.	II
Huddersfield War Memorial, Greenhead Park; 53.64759°N 1.79787°W		1922–24	The war memorial stands on a circular platform on The Belvedere, an artificial mound in the park. It is in sandstone, and was designed by Sir Charles Nicholson. The memorial consists of a column with a Tuscan colonnade behind. The column has a complex shaft with pilasters and half-columns, on a cruciform pedestal, on a square base of two steps. At the top is a deep cornice and a gilded cross, and on the front of the pedestal is an inscription. The colonnade is semicircular and two columns deep, with an ambulatory and an entablature, and it ends in paired piers with pilasters.	II*
St Cuthbert's Church; 53.66111°N 1.79313°W		Mid 1920s	The west end of the church was completed in 1956. It is built in stone with a grey slate roof, and consists of a nave and a chancel under one roof, a lower south aisle, a lobby and entrance at the west end, and a north vestry. At the west end is a niche containing a bell.	II
Telephone kiosk 53.65188°N 1.79360°W	—	1935	The telephone kiosk to the south of 80 New North Road is of the K6 type, designed by Giles Gilbert Scott. Constructed in cast iron with a square plan and a dome, it has three unperforated crowns in the top panels.	II
