= Paddock, Huddersfield =

Suburb of Huddersfield, West Yorkshire, England

Coordinates: 53.643°N 1.809°W

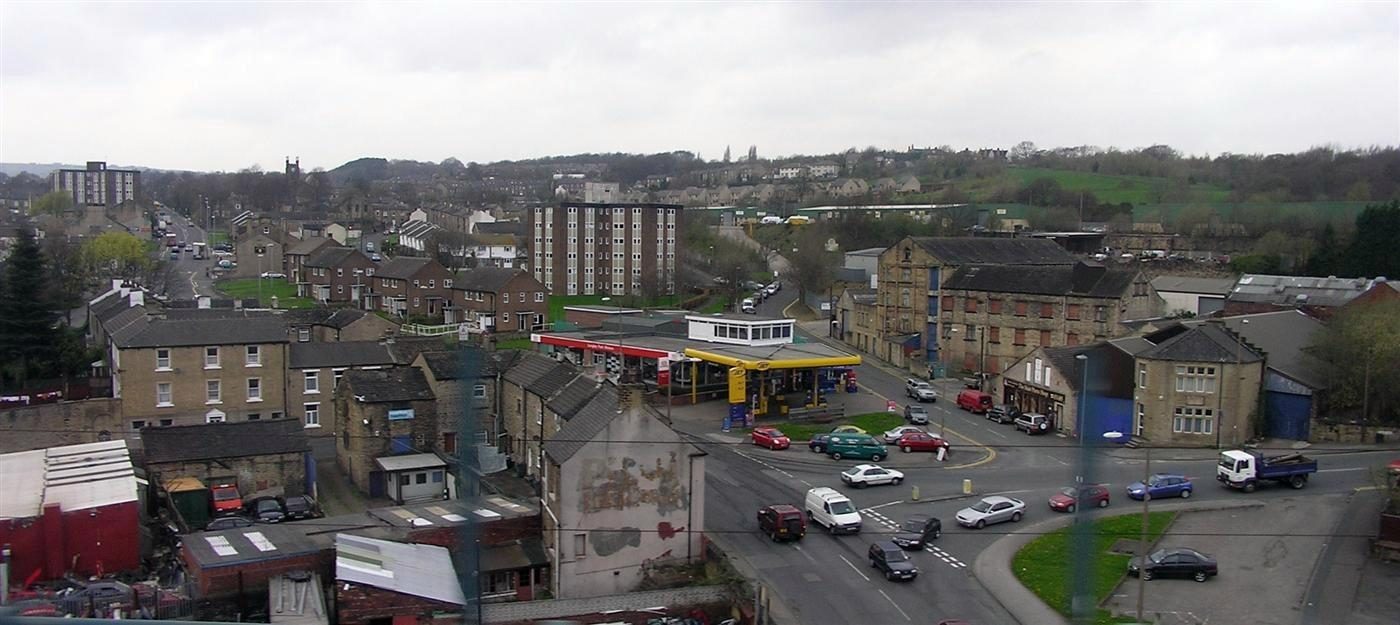
View of Paddock from a train passing over the Longroyd Bridge Viaduct

Paddock is a district of Huddersfield, West Yorkshire, England. It is situated 1-mile (1.6 km) to the south-west of the town centre.

The Paddock Ward had a population of 14,875 according to the 2001 Census.

Paddock's secondary school, Royds Hall, was attended by the former Prime Minister of the United Kingdom Harold Wilson. A 2017 Ofsted report found that the school had over 1,100 students.

== Notable people ==
- Robert Baldick, French literature scholar
- Willie Watson, English cricketer went to school in Paddock and played for the Paddock cricket team
- Harold Wilson, Prime Minister went to school in Paddock and was born in nearby Milnsbridge

== See also ==
- Listed buildings in Huddersfield (Greenhead Ward)
