= Cowcliffe =

Coordinates: 53.668°N 1.790°W

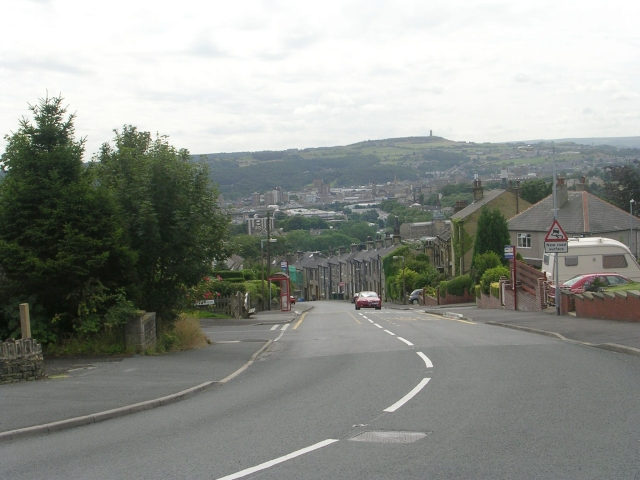
- Cowcliffe Hill Road, looking south

- Location within West Yorkshire
- Metropolitan borough: Kirklees
- Metropolitan county: West Yorkshire
- Region: Yorkshire and the Humber
- Country: England
- Sovereign state: United Kingdom
- Post town: HUDDERSFIELD
- Postcode district: HD2
- Dialling code: 01484
- Police: West Yorkshire
- Fire: West Yorkshire
- Ambulance: Yorkshire
- UK Parliament: Huddersfield

Cowcliffe is an area of Huddersfield, West Yorkshire, England.

It is situated between Fixby and Birkby based around Cowcliffe Hill Road. Cowcliffe is a discernible village, though the boundaries are not clear and is somewhat isolated from the rest of Huddersfield – only two buses an hour go through the area, destined for either Halifax and Huddersfield (First Halifax services 549).

The area is home to a pub, St. Hilda's Parish Church, Cowcliffe Methodist Church, a shop, a park and a club with bowling green.. At the west border of the area is Huddersfield Golf Club, to the north is Fixby (the golf course is known locally as Fixby Golf Course), to the south and east are Birkby and Fartown.

The ITV drama series Where The Heart Is shot a small number scenes in Cowcliffe's park in 2002, not long after the park had had a facelift from Kirklees Metropolitan Council, who installed goalposts and a designated play area.

At the top of North Cross Rd, a large house known locally as the Castle was renovated from a derelict state in the mid-1980s by a local developer and an 3 home estate built on the former gardens and the properties named after Castle features.

Cowcliffe Hill Road was once the main coach road from London to Gretna Green.

Notable former residents of Cowcliffe include the retired footballers Marcus Stewart and Chris Marsden.
