= Greenhead Park =

Urban park in West Yorkshire, England

Coordinates: 53.6482°N 1.7961°W

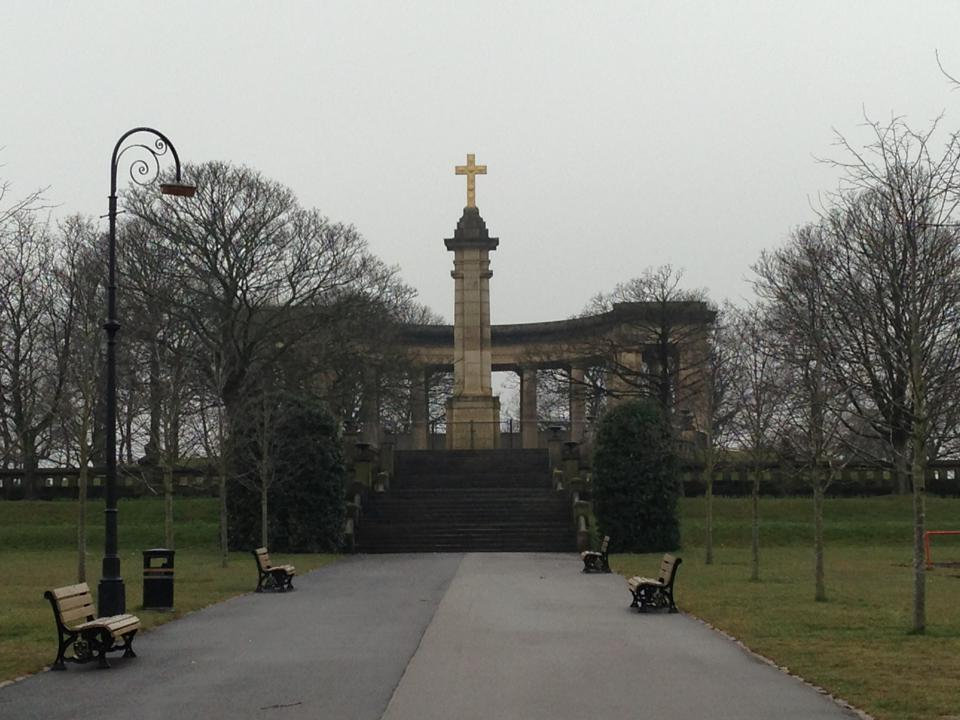
The war memorial in Greenhead park, as seen from the entrance.

Greenhead Park is an urban park located 0.5 miles (0.8 km) west of the town centre of Huddersfield, West Yorkshire, England. It is one of the largest parks in Huddersfield and was originally opened in 1884. It is an English Heritage grade II listed property and is also in a Conservation Area.

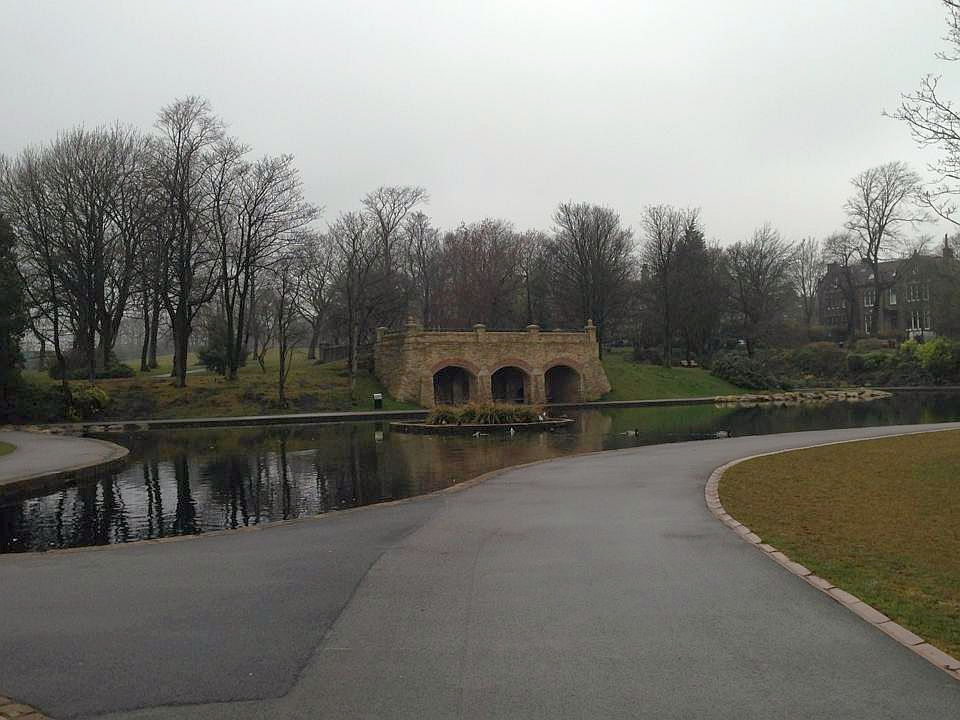
Part of the restoration project

It is a very popular park, attracting an estimated 250,000 visitors each year. It is popular with visitors from all walks of life, including students at lunchtime from the local colleges—Greenhead College and Kirklees College. The park features tennis courts, a skate park, play area and the last remaining paddling pool in Kirklees. Greenhead Park is also home to Huddersfield Pétanque Club.

== History ==
Efforts to make a public park in this part of Huddersfield began more than 15 years before its opening on 27 September 1884. It was Alderman Thomas Denham, who initially privately leased 15 acres of land from the owners so that the people of Huddersfield could enjoy access to it in 1870. Then, in 1881, the Huddersfield Corporation made a deal with the Ramsden Estate for a purchase of 30 acres of land and that is when initial development began of the park we know today.

== Events ==
The annual Caribbean Carnival event has been held in the park each summer for many years, along with many other popular events. In 2009, A £5 million restoration project, funded by the Heritage Lottery Fund, began to improve the park, and over the course of the next 2 years the park was transformed into a wonderful place to visit. Existing buildings were fully restored, a new play area created, one of the original lakes reinstated, boundary railings and gates replaced. It was completed in autumn 2012.

2012 sees the full scale return to the park of a number of large events, starting with Mumford and Sons on 2 June, followed by a 3-day Concerts in the Park the weekend after (8, 9 & 10 June), with more events lined up over the summer.

Throughout the year there's a range of other, regular events, including parkrun at 9 am every Saturday morning, Nordic walking on Fridays, and wildlife club. Greenhead Park is a short distance from where William Eastwood and his wife Mary lived at Eastwoods Yard behind their drapers shop on Manchester Street (now Market Street) where they also bred Broken haired Terriers (now called Yorkshire Terriers) including the famous Huddersfield Ben (1865 - 1871) Sold to Jonas & Mary Ann Foster of Bradford in 1867, he was a prolific winner and more importantly an outstanding stud dog and is still remembered worldwide as 'The Father of the Breed'.

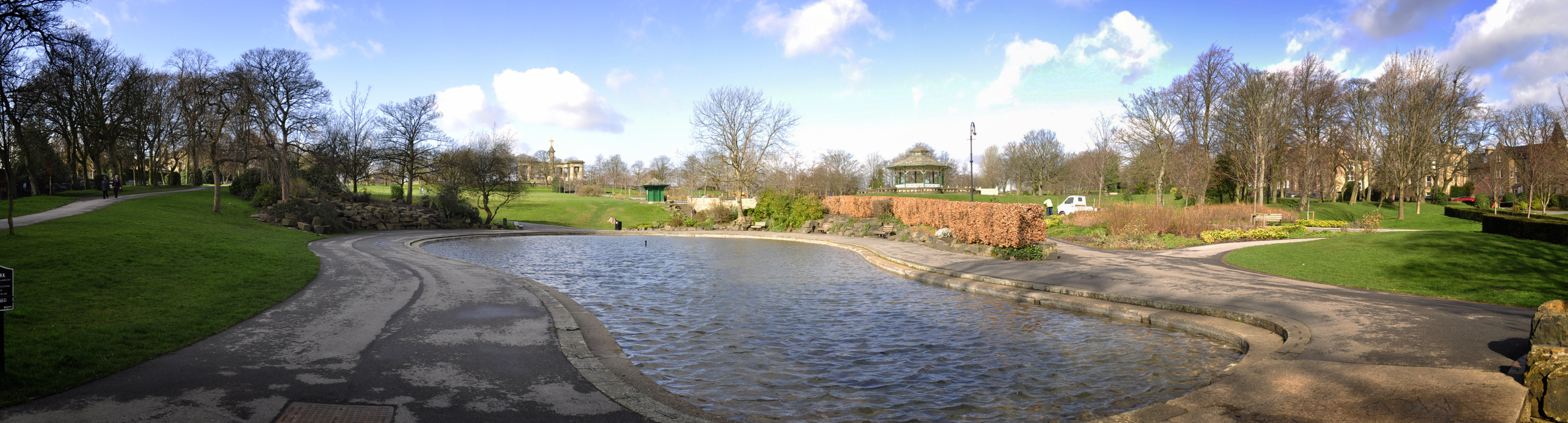
Greenhead Park, 2014

== See also ==
- Listed buildings in Huddersfield (Greenhead Ward)
