= National Lottery Heritage Fund =

Fund distributing money raised by the UK National Lottery

Non-departmental public body overview
- Formed: 1994
- Jurisdiction: United Kingdom
- Headquarters: Cannon Bridge House, 25 Dowgate Hill, London; 51.5077°N 0.0737°W
- Employees: 300
- Minister responsible: Stephanie Peacock, Parliamentary Under-Secretary of State for Sport, Media, Civil Society and Youth
- Non-departmental public body executives: Simon Thurley, Chairperson; Eilish McGuinness, Chief Executive
- Parent department: Department for Culture, Media and Sport
- Parent organisation: National Heritage Memorial Fund
- Website: www.heritagefund.org.uk

The National Lottery Heritage Fund, formerly the Heritage Lottery Fund (HLF), distributes a share of National Lottery funding, supporting a wide range of heritage projects across the United Kingdom.

== History ==
The fund's predecessor bodies were the National Land Fund, established in 1946, and the National Heritage Memorial Fund, established in 1980. The current body was established as the "Heritage Lottery Fund" in 1994. It was re-branded as the National Lottery Heritage Fund in January 2019.

== Activities ==
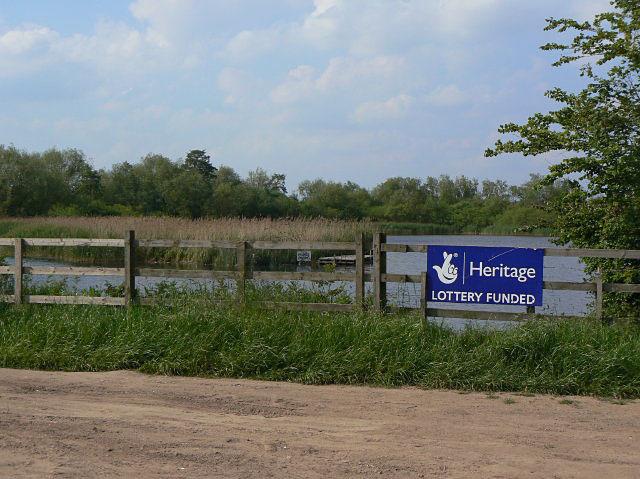
This sign indicates a Heritage Lottery funded project

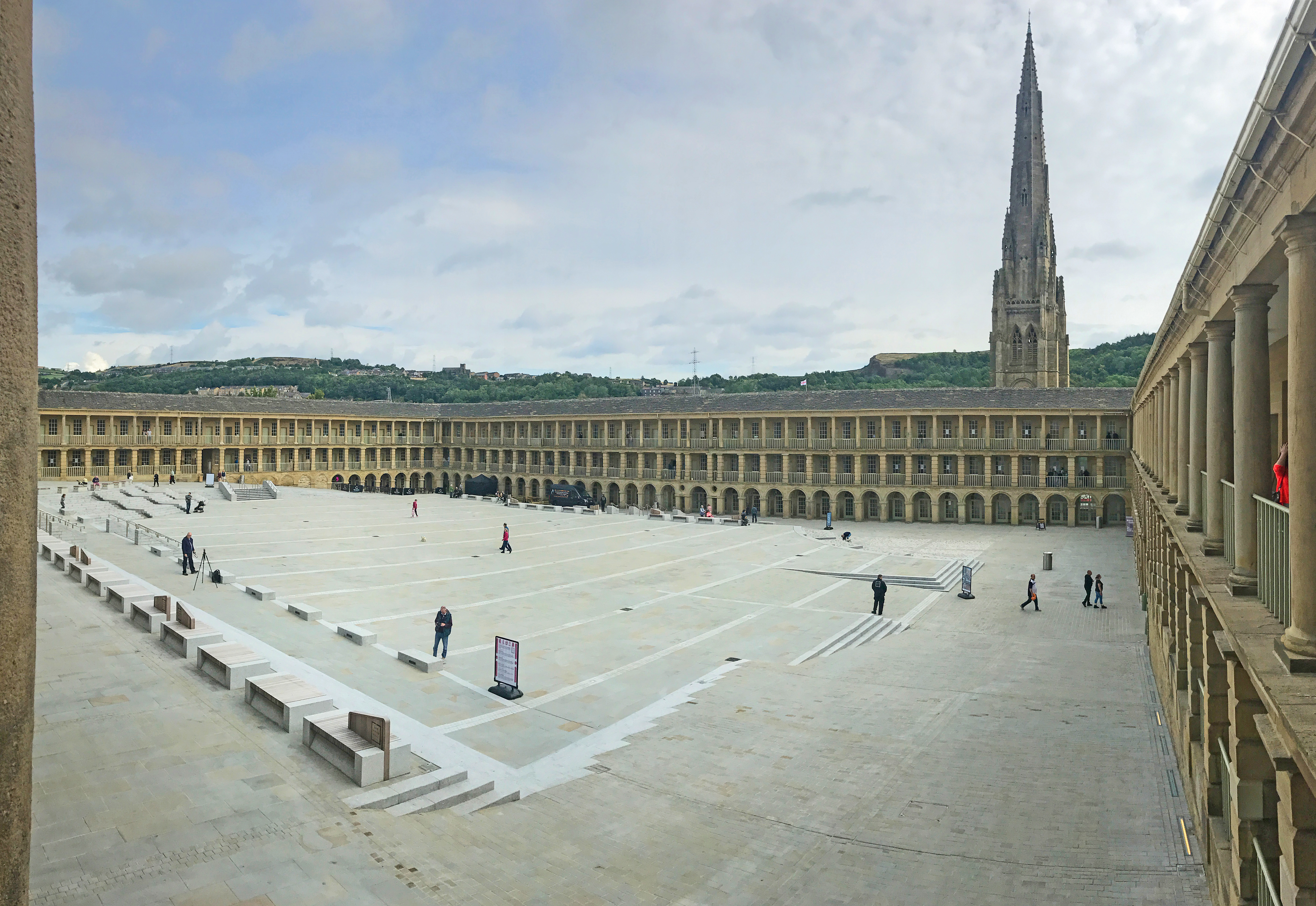
A Heritage Grant saw the renovation of Piece Hall in Halifax, West Yorkshire

The fund's income comes from the National Lottery, which is managed by Allwyn Entertainment. Its objectives are "to conserve the UK's diverse heritage, to encourage people to be involved in heritage and to widen access and learning". As of 2019, it had awarded £7.9 billion to 43,000 projects.

In 2006, the National Lottery Heritage Fund launched the Parks for People programme with the aim to revitalize historic parks and cemeteries. From 2006 to 2021, the Fund had granted £254 million to 135 projects.

In January 2019 it simplified its funding schemes under one banner – National Lottery Grants for Heritage – with awards from £3,000 to £5 million. Funding requests for projects over £5 million will be considered as part of two time-limited national competitions to be held in 2020–21 and 2022–23.

Its funding routes include the Digital Skills for Heritage Fund, a £3.5m fund for grants to support digital volunteering in the heritage sector, launched in November 2021.

== Structure ==
The chair of the trustees is appointed by the Prime Minister; René Olivieri served as interim chair from January 2020 following Sir Peter Luff's retirement at the end of 2019. Dr Simon Thurley CBE, former Chief Executive of English Heritage, became the chair of trustees on 1 April 2021.

The Chief Executive from July 2016 to December 2021 was Ros Kerslake OBE, former CEO of The Prince's Regeneration Trust. In August 2021, the Fund announced that Ros Kerslake would be stepping down at the end of 2021. The Chief Executive since January 2022 is Eilish McGuinness.

The Fund's head office is in London, and it has offices elsewhere in the UK, specifically in Exeter, Nottingham, Cambridge, Birmingham, Newcastle upon Tyne, Manchester, Leeds, Edinburgh, Cardiff, and Belfast.

== Major projects ==
Major projects have included:

- Restoration of the Kennet and Avon Canal in Somerset – awarded £25 million in 1996
- Restoration of Heaton Park in Manchester – awarded £8.5 million in 1999
- Creation of the National Waterfront Museum in Swansea – awarded £11 million in 2002
- Refurbishment of the Kelvingrove Art Gallery and Museum in Glasgow – awarded £13 million in 2002
- Restoration of Greenhead Park in Huddersfield – awarded £3.8 million in 2005
- Renovation of the Piece Hall in Halifax – awarded £13 million in 2012
- Acquisition of Titian's Diana and Callisto for the National Gallery London and National Galleries of Scotland – awarded £3 million in 2012
