= Huddersfield Corporation Tramways =

Tramway operator in England

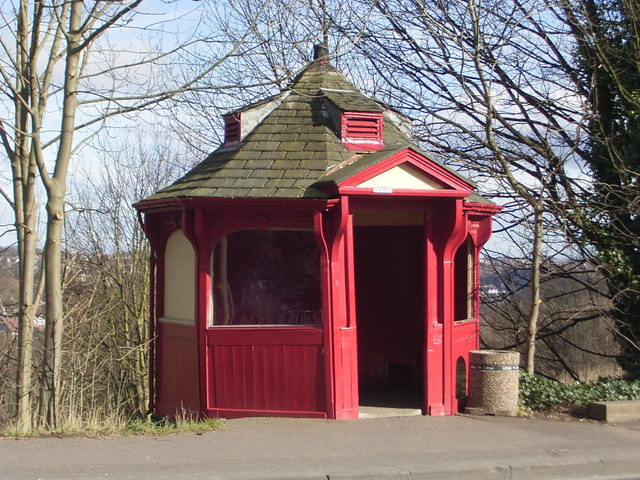
- A tram shelter on Edgerton Road, built in 1896, which was restored in 2015

Operation
- Locale: Huddersfield
- Open: 11 January 1883
- Close: 29 June 1940
- Status: Closed

Infrastructure
- Track gauge: 4 ft 7 3/4 in (1,416 mm)
- Propulsion systems: Horse, Steam and Electric

Statistics
- Route length: 39.12 miles (62.96 km)

Huddersfield Corporation Tramways operated a tramway service in Huddersfield, England, between 1883 and 1940. It initially used steam locomotives pulling unpowered tramcars, but as the system was expanded, a decision was taken to change to electric traction in 1900, and the first electric trams began operating in February 1901. The system was built to the unusual gauge of 4 ft 7 3/4 in (1,416 mm), in the hope that coal wagons from neighbouring coal tramways, which used that gauge, could be moved around the system. This did not occur, but two coal trams were used to delivered coal to three mills.

A number of extensions to the system were made until 1923, and some doubling of track took place in 1924, but a decision to trial trolleybuses was made in 1931/32, and the first tram route to be converted closed in 1933. Thereafter, lines were closed as the new infrastructure was erected, and the final tram ran on 29 June 1940. None of the vehicles survived into preservation.

== History ==
Construction of tramways in England was covered by the Tramways Act 1870 (33 & 34 Vict. c. 78), which allowed local authorities to own the infrastructure, but did not allow a municipal authority to run the service. Huddersfield received authorisation for their system in 1880, and construction began in 1881. When they then advertised for an operator, no interest was shown, and so they applied to the Board of Trade for a licence to operate the service themselves. This was granted, on the proviso that should a company subsequently express interest, and make a reasonable offer for the cars and associated plant, then Huddersfield would cease to operate the system. Trials were carried out using a steam tramway locomotive on Chappel Hill on 13 November 1882, and a Board of Trade inspection on 29 November resulted in 10 miles (16 km) of track being declared fit for purpose.

Services started on 11 January 1883. Huddersfield was the first local authority in England to operate its own tramcar services, as well as own the tramlines. The benefits of this were mostly felt by the employees, notably in being required to work fewer hours per day than employees of neighbouring systems run by private companies. Huddersfield corporation employees worked 8-hour days, compared to 14–16 for private employers.

Part of the system nearly became cable-hauled, as the Hallidie cable company offered to build and run a section. However, having laid a cable conduit between the tracks and begun work on the foundations of a building to hold the winding-engine, they pulled out of the project, and the corporation ran steam trams along the tracks. Horse trams were used on the route to Moldgreen until 1888 when they were replaced by steam trams. The tram engines were four-wheeled Wilkinson type machines. Wilkinson owned an engineering works in Wigan, and tried out a vertical-boilered locomotive on the local tramway. He secured sufficient orders that manufacture of his designs were carried out by Beyer, Peacock, and Company in Manchester, Thomas Green & Son in Leeds and Black, Hawthorn & Company in Gateshead. Passengers were carried in four-wheeled, open-top cars. Those from the Ashbury Railway Carriage and Iron Company Ltd could seat 38, and those from the Starbuck Car and Wagon Company could seat 34.

As patronage of the system increased, the corporation ordered some larger tramcars from G. F. Milnes & Co. of Birkenhead. These were bogie vehicles with a covered upper deck and could seat 62 passengers. The tram engines were underpowered to haul the new tramcars, and so 15 new locomotives were ordered from Kitson and Company of Leeds, with another 10 from Thomas Green & Son. When the system opened, the main depot was in Northumberland Street, but a new depot on Great Northern Street was opened in July 1887, with capacity for 30 locomotives and 30 tramcars. The depot included engineering facilities, as the corporation built two additional locomotives there.

The unusual track gauge of 4 ft 7 3/4 in (1,416 mm) was chosen because there were a number of coal tramways in the locality, and the corporation planned to run coal wagons around the system in addition to the passenger trams. The concept had been demonstrated to be feasible on the Portsmouth and Glasgow systems, both of which used the same gauge, but such trains did not run on the Huddersfield tramlines while there was steam haulage. In order to protect their investment, the corporation obtained an act of Parliament, the Huddersfield Corporation Act 1897 (60 & 61 Vict. c. xxvi), which enshrined their right to operate the system. 1897 was also the first year in which the tramways made an operating profit, and did not have to be supported with money from the rates. In 1900, a line to Slaithwaite was opened, which included a 3-mile (4.8 km) section which ran through the Urban District of Linthwaite. Linthwaite built the tracks for this section and then leased them for £1,125 per year to Huddersfield, who ran the steam trams over them. This was a more common model for tramway operation than Huddersfield's owner/operator model.

=== Electric services ===
The opening of the line to Slaithwaite required additional rolling stock, and it was this that ultimately led to the decision to electrify the whole system. Reports were produced by the Tramways Department, the Electricity Department and by the Borough Engineer, Mr K. F. Campbell. Campbell suggested building a new power station, car sheds and offices at Longroyd Bridge, and this was accepted by the corporation. They obtained powers in the Huddersfield Corporation Tramways Order 1900 and borrowed £47,780, (equivalent to £5,078,000 in 2025) to modernise and electrify the system in 1900. The main contractors were Greenwood & Batley of Leeds. 25 new tramcars were ordered from G. F. Milnes, who had by this time moved to new works at Hadley in Shropshire. Each car ran on two four-wheeled bogies, had an open upper deck, and seating for 56 passengers. The downstairs saloon was heated, with crimson velvet cushions and curtains at the windows.

The power station was formally opened on 7 February 1901. 150 guests were invited to the event, including the managers of other local tramway systems. The Board of Trade then made an inspection of the tracks, and electric services started running from Huddersfield railway station in St. George's Square to Outlane and Lindley both via Marsh and Edgerton on 14 February 1901. The first phase included the conversion of five routes, and these were completed by the end of February. A second phase was completed between February and July 1902, when the rest of the lines were converted. This phase included an extension to Honley of the existing tracks to Berry Brow. Honley was the first place served which was outside the Borough of Huddersfield.

A further 36 tramcars were ordered from the British Electric Car Co of Trafford Park, Manchester. These were of two designs, seating 51 and 55 passengers. They had an open-topped upper deck and ran on a four-wheeled truck. They were better suited to the steeply graded routes than the larger bogie cars. In 1903, nine more tramcars were purchased, bringing the total to 70 cars. Roofs began to be fitted to the upper decks from November 1902. When the system was converted to electric traction, the gauge was retained, as the corporation still hoped to use the steam tram locomotives to haul coal wagons around the system. In anticipation of such a service, a branch was built from the Outlane route to Wellington Mills, owned by Martin Sons & Co. The branch reached 1,245 feet (379 m) above sea level near the mills. Negotiations to allow a connection from the Bradford Road route to the coal chutes at Hillhouse Sidings took rather longer, but after three years of negotiation, the London and North Western and Lancashire and Yorkshire Joint Railway finally agreed, and the connection was made. Two electric coal trams were built, each with Westinghouse motors and Westinghouse-Newall magnetic track brakes. They could carry 10 tons of coal and were first demonstrated on 2 September 1904. Subsequently, Gosport Mill and Lindley Mill, both on the Outlane route, also took delivery of coal by the tramway. Each year around 12,000 tons of coal was delivered, and the cars covered some 9,000 miles (14,000 km).

=== Expansion ===
A series of extensions to the system took place between 1903 and 1914, and several sections were converted from single track to double track. These necessitated the acquisition of 36 more tramcars, which were purchased from the United Electric Car Company at Preston, Lancashire. During the First World War, the tramways experienced some difficulties, particularly with maintenance. Staffing shortages were helped by employing women as conductors, but they were not used to drive the trams, as some of the routes were thought to be too arduous for them. The employment of women-only lasted until 1919. After the end of the war, several more extensions were made, including one from Smithy to Brighouse, which included the only stretch of track on its own right of way, where it crossed fields to reach Clough Lane, Fixby. A final extension to the Leeds Road football ground was opened in August 1923, although further doubling of tracks took place in 1924 as part of a road-widening programme.

A new depot at Longroyd Bridge was completed in July 1921, capable of holding 100 tramcars. The fleet was expanded by the purchase of 38 more tramcars between 1919 and 1932, again obtained from Preston, although the United Electric Car Co had been taken over by Dick, Kerr & Co. in 1917, and Dick, Kerr had become part of English Electric in 1918. The final eight were fully upholstered, and fitted with air brakes.

== Closure ==
In 1931/32, Huddersfield began looking at using trolleybuses, and the tramway route to Almondbury was chosen for an experiment. Once approval from Parliament was obtained, the trams were withdrawn, the roadway was reconstructed, and new overhead wiring was erected. The new service opened on 4 December 1933, and the corporation quickly decided to convert the routes to Lindley, Outlane, and Waterloo. All three routes were opened on 11 November 1934. An order was then placed for a further 85 trolleybuses, and they were gradually brought into use as the tramway routes were converted.

Tram services ended completely on 29 June 1940. The closing ceremonies were somewhat muted, due to the blackout and other restrictions caused by the hostilities of the Second World War. In the early years, the tram service had been supported from the rates, at a cost of £73,041, but it was profitable from 1906 onwards, generating £87,027 for the corporation, which was used for rate relief. After closure, all of the trams were scrapped, and none survived.

== Bibliography ==
- Joyce, J; et al. (1986). British Trolleybus Systems. Ian Allan. ISBN 978-0-7110-1647-7.
- Klapper, Charles (1974). The Golden Age of Tramways (2nd ed.). David & Charles. ISBN 978-0-7153-6458-1.
