= Birkby, Huddersfield =

Suburb in Hudersfield in West Yorkshire, England

Coordinates: 53.662°N 1.801°W

Birkby
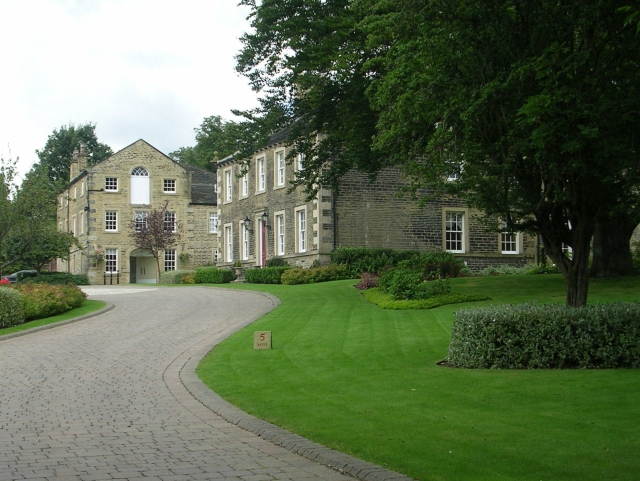
- Birkby Grange

- Location within West Yorkshire
- OS grid reference: SE 138 180
- Metropolitan borough: Kirklees
- Metropolitan county: West Yorkshire
- Region: Yorkshire and the Humber
- Country: England
- Sovereign state: United Kingdom
- Post town: HUDDERSFIELD
- Postcode district: HD2
- Dialling code: 01484
- Police: West Yorkshire
- Fire: West Yorkshire
- Ambulance: Yorkshire
- UK Parliament: Huddersfield

Birkby is a large multi-cultural suburb close to the town centre in Huddersfield, in the Kirklees borough of West Yorkshire, England. It has a population of 6,700.

An affluent suburb during Victorian times, Birkby sits in the Grimescar Valley, a greenbelt area of Huddersfield. Birkby contains Norman Park, a small park with a play area and war memorial, which commemorates those who died in the First World War.

== History ==
The name Birkby is not recorded until 1561, when it was spelt Byrkebye. The origin of the name is uncertain. It is probably of Old Danish origin, from birk "birch tree" and by "settlement".

From the study of old Ordnance Survey maps, much of the district of Birkby remained largely rural well into the 20th century, with the original settlement lying close to the town centre. Bay Hall, a local historic house dates from the 16th century but was largely restored in 1895, as a date plaque on the residence indicates. Birkby can effectively be bisected into two distinct areas, St Johns Road being the main thoroughfare. Birkby is generally more affluent to the north and west of the main thoroughfare. This can be seen with a comparison of a south Birkby postcode HD2 2RT having an average home price of £121,892 and a northern Birkby postcode of HD2 2DU having an average home price of £450,000, although this shows anomalies and is not a general trend. Recently, Birkby has seen significant residential development, as the Hopkinson's Valve Works has been redeveloped for housing.

On Sunday 12 May 2002, an arson attack took place at 40 Osborne Road, Birkby, killing eight people, including a six-month-old girl. All had been sleeping whilst the house was deliberately set on fire. One of the arsonists, Shahid Mohammed, who had fled to Pakistan, was found guilty of eight counts of murder on 6 August 2019 and was motivated by an inter-family dispute. His accomplices, Shaied Iqbal, Nazar Hussain and Shakiel Shazad, were convicted in 2003. Det Ch Supt Nick Wallen said after the verdict concerning Shahid Mohammed that the incident remains the largest single event of multiple murders that West Yorkshire Police has investigated.

== Amenities and buildings ==
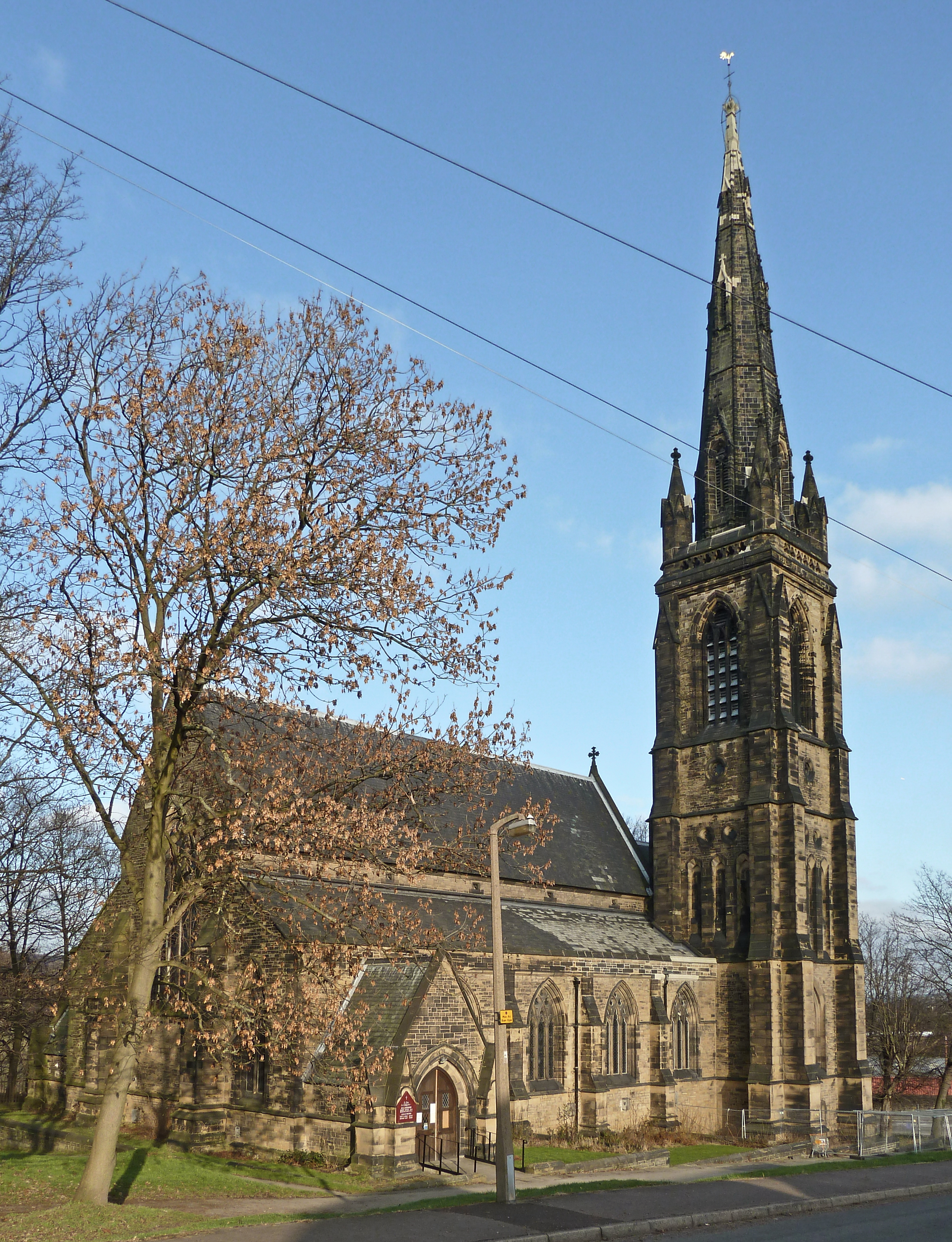
St John the Evangelist church

It has a catholic primary school, St. Patrick's, as well as Birkby Infant and Nursery School, located on Blacker Road. Birkby Junior School is located to the east of Birkby and is addressed as Fartown, Huddersfield. Birkby is a semi-rural area, home to a large white and Asian population, having four mosques. Elsewhere, the suburb contains two Church of England chapels, a Buddhist centre, as well as a meetinghouse for the Church of Jesus Christ of Latter-day Saints. The centre of Birkby, located around the east of Blacker Road and the north of St John's Road, has a high concentration of Asian retailers and food outlets, serving the local Asian community.

== See also ==
- Listed buildings in Huddersfield (Greenhead Ward)
