= James Pritchett =

James Pritchett may refer to:

- James Pritchett (actor) (1922–2011), American actor
- James Pritchett (footballer) (born 1982), football player for New Zealand
- James Pigott Pritchett (1789–1868), British (York) architect
- James Pigott Pritchett Jr (1830–1911), British (Darlington) architect
