= Beaumont Park =

Suburb of Huersfield, West Yorkshire, England

Coordinates: 53.62778°N 1.80793°W

Beaumont Park is a suburb of Huddersfield in the Metropolitan Borough of Kirklees, West Yorkshire, England, located between Netherton, Crosland Moor and Lockwood.

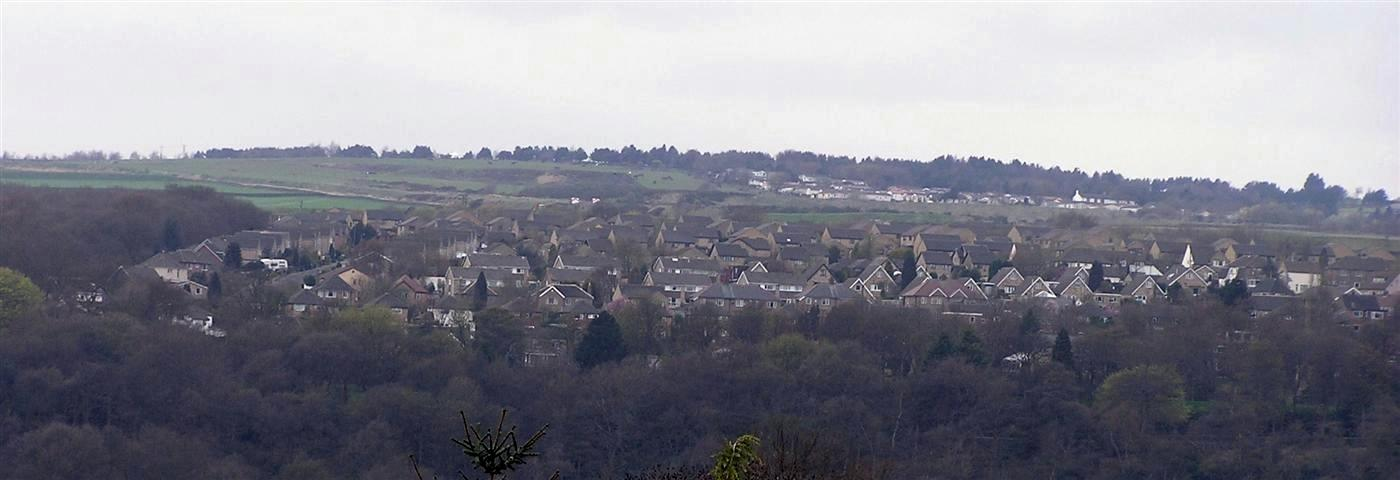
View of the housing area of Beaumont Park, Huddersfield

The area's housing is situated around the periphery of Dungeon Wood, a medium-sized woodland and recreational park bequeathed to the people of Huddersfield in 1879 by the Beaumonts of Whitley estate (Henry Fredrick Beaumont. Adjacent to the park is Beagle Woods, a popular walking venue. The wood is home to a kennels with a working pack of English Beagle hounds.

== Public park ==
The park was officially opened on 13 October 1883, by Prince Leopold, fourth son of Queen Victoria, and his wife Princess Helena of Waldeck and Pyrmont (The Duke and Duchess of Albany). It was Huddersfield's first public park and is a fine example of a Victorian park. The park is maintained by Kirklees Council with assistance from a group of volunteers called the Friends of Beaumont Park who are interested in returning the grounds to their former glory, and have instigated many improvements to the park including a new bandstand and water cascades.

In 2011 the park was awarded a first 'Green Flag Award' by the Environmental charity Keep Britain Tidy organisation and has retained it each subsequent year.

== See also ==
- Listed buildings in Crosland Moor and Netherton
