= Listed buildings in Brearton =

Brearton is a civil parish in the county of North Yorkshire, England. It contains four listed buildings that are recorded in the National Heritage List for England. All the listed buildings are designated at Grade II, the lowest of the three grades, which is applied to "buildings of national importance and special interest". The parish contains the village of Brearton and the surrounding area. All the listed buildings are in the village, and consist of a church and three houses.

== Buildings ==
Name and location	Photograph	Date	Notes
East View; 54.04412°N 1.50909°W	—	Late 18th to early 19th century	The house is in magnesian limestone, with a projecting eaves band, and a pantile roof with four eaves courses of stone slate. There are two storeys and two bays. In the centre is a doorway, to its left is a blocked doorway, and the windows are three-light horizontally-sliding sashes. All the openings have tripartite lintels.
Eagle House; 54.04305°N 1.51241°W	—	1833	The house, which is in the style of the 17th century, is in gritstone, with a string course, a moulded eaves course, and a grey slate roof with gable copings and kneelers with pyramid finials. The central doorway has a moulded surround, a four-centred arch and a dated lintel. Above the doorway is a crest, and the windows are deeply recessed, chamfered and mullioned, with three lights and hood moulds.
Brearton Hall; 54.04349°N 1.51112°W		Early to mid 19th century	The house is in magnesian limestone with a stone slate roof. There are two storeys and fronts of three and two bays. The central doorway has a decorative fanlight, and the windows are sashes with flat arches of splayed voussoirs, and projecting stone sills.
St John's Church; 54.04418°N 1.50747°W		1836	The church, designed by J. P. Pritchett, is in magnesian limestone with gritstone dressings, on a plinth, and has a chamfered eaves cornice, and a purple slate roof with gable copings and shaped kneelers. There is a rectangular plan with three bays. The doorway at the west end has an ogee head and a hood mould, above which is a pilaster rising to a gabled bellcote with a crocketed finial.
