= Thornton Lodge =

Suburb of Huddersfield, West Yorkshire, England

Coordinates: 53.638°N 1.798°W

Thornton Lodge is a suburb of Huddersfield, West Yorkshire. It borders Crosland Moor to the west, Lockwood to the south, and Longroyd Bridge to the north. It mostly comprises suburban housing and some small shops, with industrial units around the area bordering Longroyd Bridge.

== Geography ==
The housing area lies approximately 1 mile (1.6 km) south-west of Huddersfield town centre, on the southern slope of the Colne Valley's eastern end, overlooking the A62 Leeds to Manchester road.

== History ==
Thornton Lodge was originally a country manor that belonged to the Thornton family of Yorkshire who had owned properties in the area since at least 1686. The house is now a ruined, almost derelict shell of its former self.

== Infrastructure ==
The major employers within this area are involved in the clothing, textile, and engineering industries.

The nearest rail services are available at Lockwood railway station.

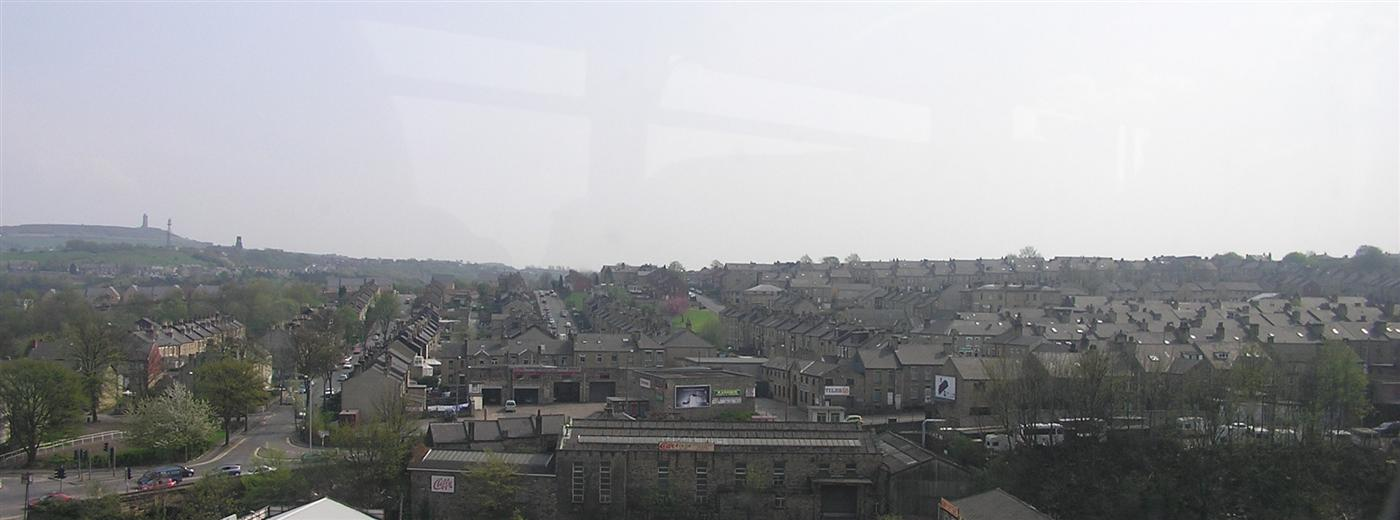
Thornton Lodge click on photo to enlarge it

== See also ==
- Listed buildings in Crosland Moor and Netherton
