= Boston Cemetery =

Cemetery in Lincolnshire, England

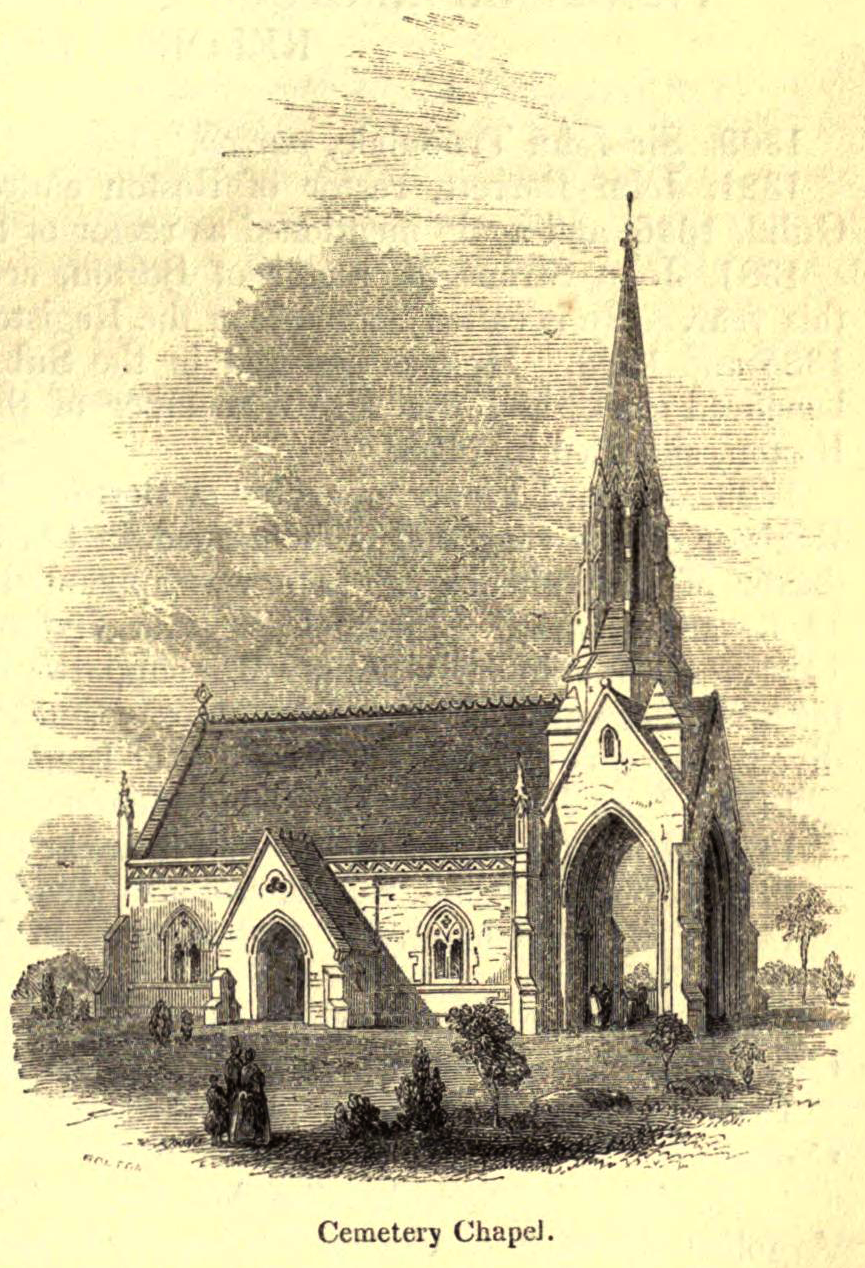
- 1856 engraving of Pritchett's chapel
- Interactive map of Boston Cemetery

Details
- Established: 1855
- Location: Boston, Lincolnshire
- Country: England
- Coordinates: 52.9888°N 0.0274°W
- No. of interments: 38,000
- Website: Boston Cemetery
- Find a Grave: Boston Cemetery

Boston Cemetery is a cemetery located in Boston, Lincolnshire in England. The cemetery dates back to 1855 and was laid out by Darlington architect James Pigott Pritchett junior.

== History ==
In 1854, a competition was held to design two chapels, a lodge and entrance gates for the new Boston Cemetery. The first prize was won by Pritchett & Sons of York, the firm of James Pigott Pritchett senior, but it was his son James Pigott Pritchett junior, who had just established his own firm in Darlington, who attended the meeting in July 1854 and was commissioned to prepare plans. He provided the layout for the grounds and plans for the twin chapels and a lodge, all in the gothic style.

The layout of the cemetery, lodge and Anglican chapel remain intact, though the nonconformist chapel was demolished in 1961.

== Notable burials ==
- Herbert Ingram, founder of The Illustrated London News

== War Graves ==
The cemetery contains the war graves of 82 Commonwealth service personnel. There are 50 from World War I and 30 from World War II. The graves from the former war are scattered throughout the cemetery, most of those from the latter war are in a special war graves plot, behind which is a memorial to civilians of Boston who died by enemy action in the same war. There is also one non-war grave in the war graves plot.

One of the most curious graves is that of Major Walter George Burnett Dickinson (1858–1914) who died of a heart attack 36 hours after the beginning of the First World War whilst requisitioning horses in the Boston area. Due to CWGC rules this still qualifies as an official "war death", making him, on paper at least, the first Major to die serving in the war.

Another grave is that of Linley Moreton Phillips, an Australian civilian prisoner of war in Ruhleben internment camp from 1914 to 1918, who died on ship returning to Boston.
