= Crosland Moor =

Coordinates: 53.632912°N 1.814863°W

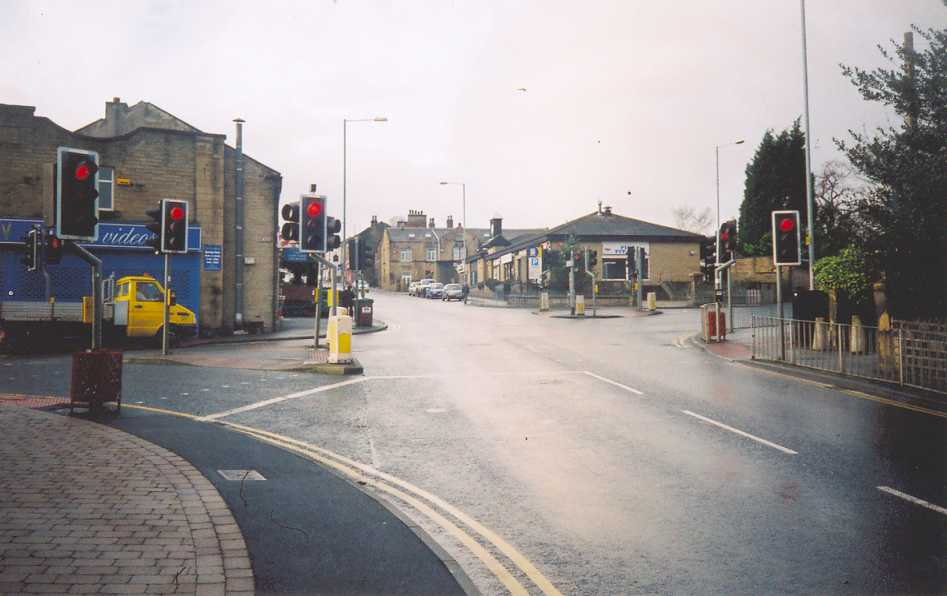
- View of the Blackmoorfoot Road/Park Road junction

- Location within West Yorkshire
- Population: 18,723 (Ward. Crosland Moor and Netherton. 2011 census)
- OS grid reference: SE1234015170
- Metropolitan borough: Kirklees
- Metropolitan county: West Yorkshire
- Region: Yorkshire and the Humber
- Country: England
- Sovereign state: United Kingdom
- Post town: HUDDERSFIELD
- Postcode district: HD4
- Dialling code: 01484
- Police: West Yorkshire
- Fire: West Yorkshire
- Ambulance: Yorkshire
- UK Parliament: Colne Valley

Crosland Moor is a district of the town of Huddersfield, West Yorkshire, England.

== Location ==
It begins 1 mile (1.6 km) to the south west of Huddersfield town centre. Crosland Moor begins at the junction of the Manchester Road A62 and Blackmoorfoot Road the main thoroughfare. The area rises up the hillside to overlook the areas of Milnsbridge and Golcar in the Colne Valley. The name is derived from the local landowners the Crosland family, who owned much of the area in 15th and 16th centuries. Their home Crosland Lodge, and business holdings at Crosland Moor Mill were situated in the area.

The Walpole and Balmoral Avenue housing estates are also a part of Crosland Moor. The area (including Crosland Hill and Beaumont Park) is bordered by Lockwood, Netherton, Linthwaite, Milnsbridge, Paddock and Thornton Lodge.

== Political ==
The electoral ward of Crosland Moor and Netherton is in the Huddersfield constituency. The area of Crosland Moor includes Beaumont Park, Crosland Hill and Walpole and has a population of 9,085 according to the 2001 census. The ward was renamed Crosland Moor and Netherton in time for the 2011 Census. Its population at the Census was 18,723.

== St Luke's Hospital ==
The former St. Luke's Hospital was situated alongside Blackmoorfoot Road. It was originally a workhouse for the poor and needy of the area in the 19th century. This ended up being a hospital that included the headquarters for the Calderdale & Huddersfield NHS Trust, a psychiatric unit and also other services such as physiotherapy. The hospital closed in December 2010 and over time, all the buildings on that site have been demolished and the site has been fenced off. However, in 2015 a plan to regenerate the hospital site with up to 200 homes, a retail unit and a small neighbourhood centre have been approved by councillors.

== Education ==
Moor End Academy (formally Moor End Technology College) is Crosland Moor's secondary school based on Dryclough Road near Beaumont Park, the secondary school is very big and is probably the most popular school for children and teenagers who live in Crosland Moor Oak Primary School is also on Dryclough Road. Beaumont Primary Academy is a new school based near the same grounds of Moor end.

== Beaumont Park ==
At the end of Dryclough Road, Beaumont Park, Huddersfield's first park, begins. Opened in 1883, the park mainly consists of woodland and is on a hillside that looks over the Holme Valley and the Lockwood railway viaduct. It is currently being restored to its former glory by the Friends of Beaumont Park. Housing around the park is some of the most expensive in Huddersfield.

== William Horsfall and the Luddites ==
Along Blackmoorfoot Road beyond the junction with Dryclough Road was the spot where in April 1812 mill owner William Horsfall was shot and killed by the Luddites George Mellor, William Thorpe, Thomas Smith and Benjamin Walker. They objected to the introduction of machinery at Horsfall's mill in Marsden. Walker turned informer, and the other three were hanged. A side street where the incident occurred was named after Horsfall (William Horsfall Street).

== Airfield ==
Just off Blackmoorfoot Road beyond the Crosland Heath Golf Course is the Crosland Moor airfield which was established by the David Brown Engineering Works based in Lockwood. Even further up the road is Huddersfield's Observatory which is situated high over the town for good views of the sky at night.

Before the airfield is the Wellfield quarry where Crosland Hill Sandstone comes from. According to the Building Research Establishment it is a durable stone not affected by acid rain or air pollution.

== See also ==
- Listed buildings in Crosland Moor and Netherton
