= St John's Church, Brearton =

Grade II church in North Yorkshire, England

Coordinates: 54°02′39″N 1°30′27″W

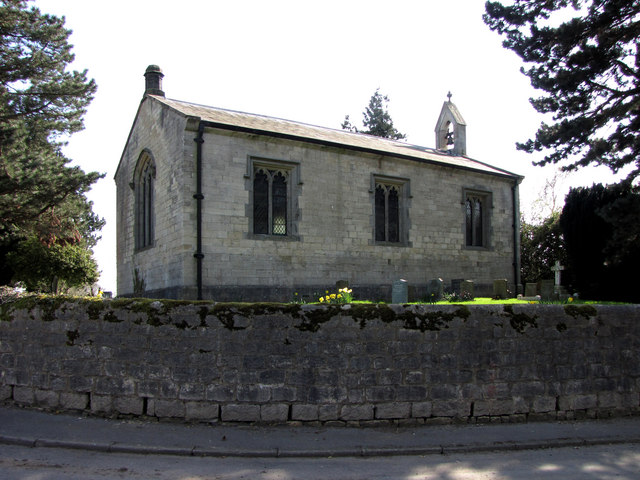
The church, in 2010

St John's Church is an Anglican church in Brearton, a village in North Yorkshire, in England.

The building was commissioned by Thomas Duncombe in 1836, and designed by James Pigott Pritchett. It originally seated 150 worshippers. The building was Grade II listed in 1987.

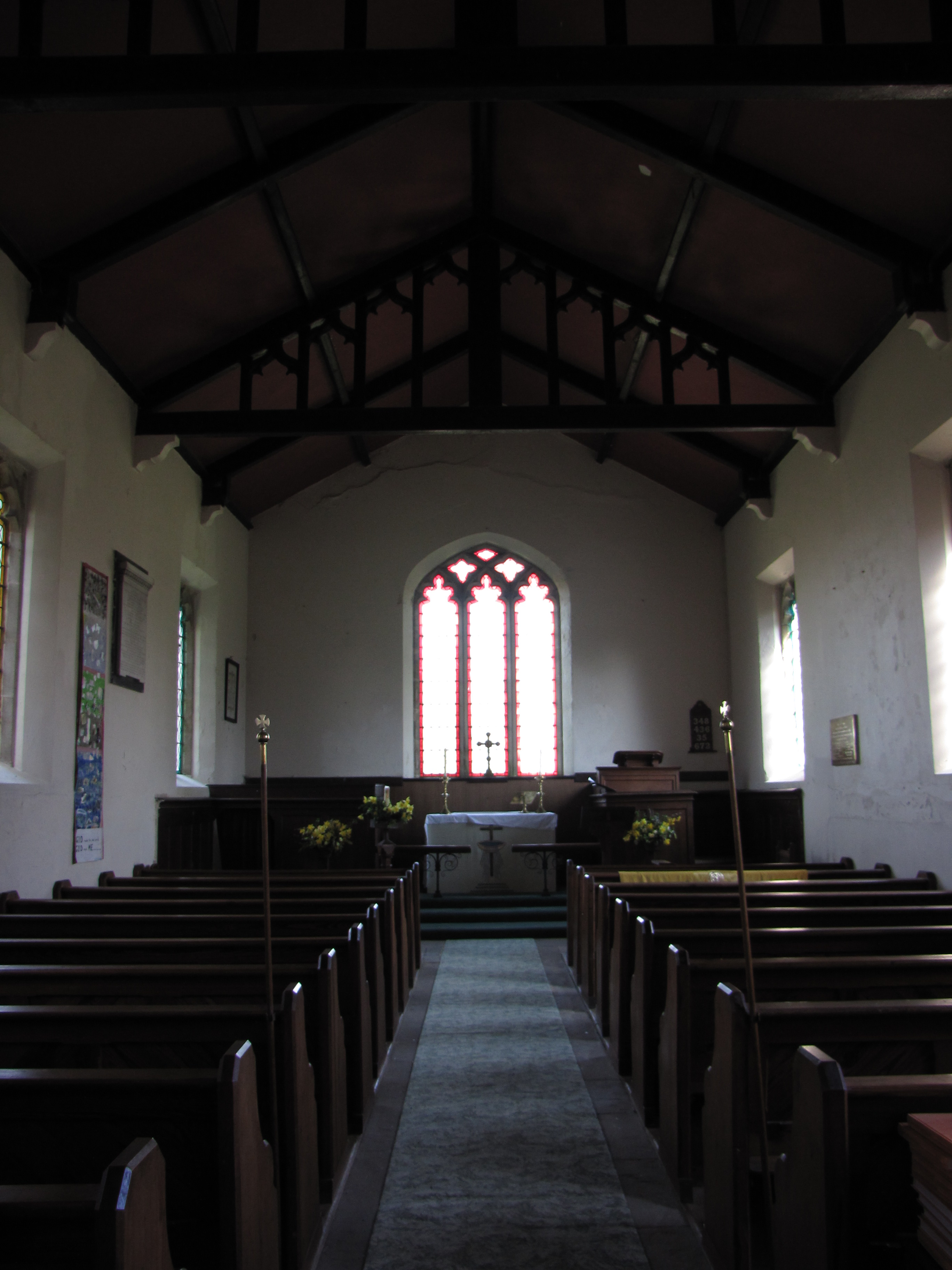
View from the nave into the chancel

The church is built of magnesian limestone with gritstone dressings, on a plinth, and has a chamfered eaves cornice, and a purple slate roof with gable copings and shaped kneelers. There is a rectangular plan with three bays. The doorway at the west end has an ogee head and a hood mould, above which is a pilaster rising to a gabled bellcote with a crocketed finial. Inside, the north-east corner is partitioned off as a vestry. There is a reading desk, a pulpit and an octagonal font.

== See also ==
- Listed buildings in Brearton
