= Listed buildings in Crosland Moor and Netherton =

Crosland Moor and Netherton is an unparished area and a ward in the metropolitan borough of Kirklees, West Yorkshire, England. It contains 103 listed buildings that are recorded in the National Heritage List for England.

Of these, one is listed at Grade II*, the middle of the three grades, and the others are at Grade II, the lowest grade. Crosland Moor is a district of the town of Huddersfield, and Netherton is a village to the southwest of the town. The ward also contains the districts of Beaumont Park, Lockwood and Thornton Lodge, and the village of South Crosland. The districts of the town are residential, and around the villages are areas of countryside.

Most of the listed buildings are houses and associated structures, farmhouses and farm buildings. The other listed buildings include churches, chapels and associated structures, cattle troughs and a drinking trough, a pinfold, shops, a hotel, brewery buildings, a mill building and works, a school, milestones, a canal bridge, a well, a former mechanics' institute, and a former town hall.

== Key ==
Grade	Criteria
II*	Particularly important buildings of more than special interest
II	Buildings of national importance and special interest

== Buildings ==
Name and location	Photograph	Date	Notes	Grade
Crosland Hall; 53.63034°N 1.82381°W		Early 16th century (possible)	Originally timber framed, the house was later encased in stone. It has a stone slate roof, two storeys, a hall range of two gabled bays, and an extension to the east. The gabled bays contain mullioned and transomed windows, and elsewhere the windows are mullioned or have single lights. The central doorway has a moulded surround and a shallow-arched monolithic head, and is flanked by doorways with chamfered surrounds and hood moulds. The gables on the front have gargoyles, and in the east gable end is a taking-in door.	II*
Fold Farmhouse; 53.61304°N 1.81470°W	—	17th century	The farmhouse is in stone, rendered at the front, and has a stone slate roof with coped gables. There are two storeys, and a front of two gabled bays. The doorway has a stone surround, and the windows are recessed and mullioned, those in the upper floor with hood moulds.	II
The Green; 53.63274°N 1.79635°W	—	17th century (or earlier)	The earliest part of the house is the west part, the east part dating probably from the 18th century, and refronted in the 19th century. The building is rendered, and has a stone slate roof. The west part may have a timber framed core, there are two storeys, and the gable end faces the road with ornamental bargeboards. There is a mullioned window on the side, and the other windows are modern. The east part has quoins, stone brackets to moulded gutters, two storeys and an attic. The doorway and windows, which are sashes, have raised surrounds and moulded imposts, and in the attic is a gabled dormer with a round-arched casement window. At the rear are sash windows, mullioned windows, and a mullioned and transomed stair window.	II
Sun End Farmhouse and barn 53.61035°N 1.82652°W	—	17th or 18th century	The oldest part is the barn, which was largely rebuilt in the 19th century, retaining some of its internal timbers, and the farmhouse dates from the early 19th century. The buildings are in stone and have a stone slate roof with coped gables and moulded kneelers. The house has two storeys and a sill band. Most of the windows are modern, and there is a mullioned window with two lights blocked in the south end wall. The barn has round-headed doorways, and three outshuts.	II
67 and 69 Crosland Hill Road, Crosland Moor; 53.63169°N 1.82479°W	—	18th century	A pair of houses and a barn in a terrace, they are in stone and have a stone slate roof with coped gables and kneelers. The houses have two storeys, in the ground floor are two tripartite sash windows, and the upper floor contains two three-light mullioned windows. The barn has one storey and various openings.	II
100–104 Crosland Hill Road, Crosland Moor; 53.63238°N 1.82499°W	—	18th century	A row of three stone houses, No. 104 rendered, that have a stone slate roof with coped gables and moulded kneelers. There are two storeys, mullioned windows in No. 102, and most of the other windows are modern replacements.	II
72 Hanson Road, Lockwood; 53.63053°N 1.80181°W	—	18th century	A stone house with a stone slate roof and two storeys. There is a tripartite casement window in the ground floor, and the other windows are mullioned, with a two-light window in the ground floor, and two three-light windows containing sashes in the upper floor.	II
60 and 62 Meltham Road, Lockwood; 53.63178°N 1.79815°W	—	18th century	A pair of stone houses in a terrace with a stone slate roof. No. 62 has two storeys and No. 64 has two storeys and a basement. The windows are mullioned, with some blocked lights.	II
66 and 68 Meltham Road, Lockwood; 53.63174°N 1.79826°W	—	18th century	A pair of stone houses in a terrace, with stone gutter brackets and a stone slate roof. There are two storeys, and the windows are mullioned, with a three-light window in the ground floor, and a two-light window in the upper floor.	II
70 Meltham Road, Lockwood; 53.63168°N 1.79840°W	—	18th century	A stone house in a terrace, with stone gutter brackets and a stone slate roof. There are two storeys, the doorway is to the right, and there is a three-light mullioned window in each floor.	II
72 Meltham Road, Lockwood; 53.63166°N 1.79847°W	—	18th century	A stone house in a terrace, with stone gutter brackets and a stone slate roof. There are two storeys, the doorway is to the left, and there is a three-light mullioned window, the central lights sashes, in each floor.	II
74 Meltham Road, Lockwood; 53.63164°N 1.79853°W	—	18th century	A stone house at the end of a terrace, with stone gutter brackets and a stone slate roof. There are two storeys, the doorway is to the right, and the window are mullioned, with a three-light and a two-light window in the upper floor, and a four-light window in the ground floor.	II
1 and 2 Butternab Lane and barn, Netherton; 53.61787°N 1.81162°W	—	18th century	Two houses and a barn in one range, No. 1 being the oldest, and No. 2 and the barn dating from the early 19th century. They are in stone with stone gutter brackets and stone slate roofs. No. 1 has two storeys, and contains casement windows. No. 2 has three storeys, one casement window, and the other windows are mullioned. The barn to the east has two storeys and contains various doorways and single-light windows.	II
104 Moor Lane, Netherton; 53.61455°N 1.80767°W		18th century	A house and a barn in one range, they are in stone, and have a stone slate roof with coped gables and moulded kneelers. The barn to the west has one storey, and contains a blocked three-centred arch. To the east, the house has two storeys, and contains mullioned windows with some lights blocked.	II
106 Moor Lane, Netherton; 53.61459°N 1.80747°W	—	18th century	A stone house in a terrace, with a stone slate roof. There are two storeys, and the windows are mullioned with some lights blocked.	II
108 Moor Lane, Netherton; 53.61461°N 1.80735°W	—	18th century	A rendered stone house in a terrace, with a stone slate roof. There are three storeys, and the windows are mullioned, with two lights in the ground floor, and three in the upper two floors.	II
110 Moor Lane, Netherton; 53.61464°N 1.80727°W	—	18th century	A stone house in a terrace, with a stone slate roof. There are two storeys, and the windows are mullioned, with three lights in the ground floor, and two in the upper floor.	II
120 Moor Lane, Netherton; 53.61468°N 1.80708°W	—	18th century	A stone house in a terrace, with a stone slate roof. There are two storeys, and the windows are mullioned with some lights blocked.	II
122 Moor Lane, Netherton; 53.61469°N 1.80699°W	—	18th century	A stone house at the end of a terrace, with a stone slate roof. There are two storeys, and the windows are mullioned, with three lights in the ground floor, and two in the upper floor.	II
40 Midway and barn, South Crosland; 53.61182°N 1.82770°W	—	18th century	A house and barn in a single range, refronted in the 19th century. The buildings are in stone, the house has a modern tile roof, and the roof of the barn is in stone slate. At the rear of the house is a mullioned window with blocked lights, and the barn has an elliptical-headed arch and two round-headed loft windows.	II
41 and 43 Midway, South Crosland; 53.61195°N 1.82824°W	—	18th century	A pair of stone houses with a stone slate roof. There are two storeys, there is one fixed window, and the other windows are mullioned.	II
46–50 Midway, South Crosland; 53.61239°N 1.82820°W	—	18th century	A group of three houses, No. 48 being the oldest. They are in stone with stone slate roofs and two storeys, and No. 50 has a coped gable with moulded kneelers. On the front is a porch with a chamfered lintel, oculi in each wall, and benches inside. Most of the windows are mullioned, some mullions have been removed, and there is a tripartite casement window.	II
52 and 54 Midway, South Crosland; 53.61264°N 1.82842°W	—	18th century	A pair of stone houses, roughcast on the front, they have a stone slate roof with coped gables on kneelers. There are two storeys, the windows in No. 52 are mullioned, and in No. 54 they are modern casements.	II
10 School Hill and outbuilding, South Crosland; 53.61407°N 1.83194°W	—	18th century	The building is in stone and has a stone slate roof with coped gables and moulded kneelers. There are two storeys, and both parts contain mullioned windows with some mullions removed, and some lights blocked. In the outhouse is a stable door.	II
Butterknob Farmhouse and Cottage; 53.62059°N 1.80722°W	—	18th century	The farmhouse and cottage are in stone and have a stone slate roof with a coped gable and moulded kneelers to the east. There are two storeys and a lean-to outshut with a catslide roof on each side. The building has one range of casement windows on the west, and the other windows are sashes.	II
Cattle troughs, Netherton; 53.61356°N 1.81587°W	—	18th century (possible)	A pair of large cattle troughs, they are in stone, and set at right angles to the road.	II
Lower Batter Farmhouse; 53.61419°N 1.83092°W	—	18th century	The farmhouse, which was later extended, is in stone, and has a stone slate roof with coped gables and moulded kneelers. There are two storeys, the windows in the original part are mullioned, and in the extension they are sashes.	II
Nether Moor Farmhouse; 53.61641°N 1.82549°W	—	18th century	The farmhouse is in stone, partly rendered, and has a stone slate roof, hipped at the west end, and with a coped gable and moulded kneelers to the east. There are two storeys, and a single-storey outshut at the rear. Most of the windows in the main block are modern casements, and there are two mullioned windows, one blocked. In the outshut is a mullioned and transomed window. To the rear is an L-shaped barn with a blocked archway.	II
Barn, Pond Farm; 53.61212°N 1.82803°W	—	18th century (probable)	The barn, which faces the road, is in stone with a stone slate roof. It contains various openings with monolithic lintels.	II
School House; 53.61375°N 1.83009°W	—	1762	The house is in stone with a stone slate roof and two storeys. The windows are mullioned, with some mullions removed.	II
Green Fold Farmhouse and barn 53.61171°N 1.82728°W	—	1776	A house and barn in one range, in stone, with a stone slate roof that has a coped gable with a moulded kneeler. The house contains mullioned windows, with some lights blocked. In the barn is a modern porch above which is a datestone, and in the east gable end are pigeon holes and ledges.	II
3 Dockery, Lockwood; 53.63366°N 1.79602°W	—	Late 18th to early 19th century	A stone house at the end of a terrace, with a stone slate roof and two storeys. It contains a range of three-light mullioned windows.	II
4 Dockery, Lockwood; 53.63371°N 1.79603°W	—	Late 18th to early 19th century	A stone house in a terrace, with a stone slate roof and two storeys. It contains a sash window, and the other windows are mullioned, with some mullions removed.	II
5 and 6 Dockery, Lockwood; 53.63378°N 1.79602°W	—	Late 18th to early 19th century	A pair of houses with a stone slate roof and two storeys. They contain a sash window, a single-light window and two two-light mullioned windows.	II
7 and 8 Dockery, Lockwood; 53.63384°N 1.79595°W	—	Late 18th to early 19th century	A pair of stone houses under a shared gable, No. 7 painted, with a stone slate roof. There are two storeys and attics, and the windows are mullioned, with some mullions removed. No. 7 has a modern glazed porch, and No. 8 has a lean-to porch under a catslide roof.	II
44 Lightenfield Lane, Netherton; 53.61172°N 1.81320°W	—	Late 18th to early 19th century	A stone house with a stone slate roof. There are two storeys, and the windows are mullioned, with some blocked lights.	II
13 and 15 Netherton Fold, Netherton; 53.61287°N 1.81451°W	—	Late 18th to early 19th century	Two stone houses with a hipped stone slate roof. There are three storeys, the upper two storeys jettied on moulded corbels. Some of the windows are casements, and the others are mullioned with some mullions removed.	II
Cherry Cottage; 53.61384°N 1.81400°W	—	18th or early 19th century	A stone house with a stone slate roof. There are two storeys, a double depth plan and three bays. The windows are bipartite sashes with stone mullions.	II
Drinking Trough, Crab Tree Well; 53.61257°N 1.83010°W		18th or 19th century	The drinking trough consists of five separate monolithic troughs linked by cast iron conduits. Behind them is a dry stone retaining wall.	II
Green Gate Knoll; 53.61487°N 1.82744°W	—	18th or early 19th century	A house with a barn range to the south and modern extensions. The building is in stone, and has a stone slate roof with a coped gable and moulded kneelers to the west. There are two storeys, and the upper floor contains tripartite casement windows. In the ground floor are two doorways, one blocked, and mullioned windows with some lights blocked, and some mullions removed.	II
Moor Cottage; 53.61550°N 1.80648°W	—	18th or early 19th century	A farmhouse and barn converted into a house, it is in stone with a stone slate roof, and a gable end with applied timber framing. There are two storeys, and between the farmhouse and barn is a 20th-century two-storey porch. There is an earlier wooden porch with a moulded gable, and three round-headed arches with moulded voussoirs and keystones. The windows are mullioned, and there is a canted bay window. In the barn is an elliptical-headed arch, sash windows, and a doorway, and it has a single-storey extension to the east.	II
Pinfold, Crab Tree Well; 53.61247°N 1.83021°W	—	18th or 19th century	The pinfold is in dry stone walling, and has roughly a rectangular plan. There is an arched entrance with monolithic jambs and a lintel.	II
Sunny Bank; 53.61432°N 1.82930°W	—	18th or early 19th century	A house at the end of a terrace, it is in stone, with quoins and a stone slate roof. There are two storeys and three bays, and the windows are casements.	II
Coach house and stables, 198 Meltham Road; 53.62205°N 1.80682°W	—	1822	The coach house and stables are in stone with a stone slate roof. There are two storeys and six bays. The openings include windows and doors, one a stable door. In the coach house is a doorway with a three-centred arch with a dated keystone, and a loft door above.	II
174–190 Blackmoorfoot Road, Crosland Moor; 53.63700°N 1.81162°W	—	Early 19th century	A terrace of stone houses with stone gutter brackets and a stone slate roof. There are two storeys, the windows are mullioned, and No.176 has a projecting modern shop front.	II
194 and 200 Blackmoorfoot Road, Crosland Moor; 53.63687°N 1.81193°W	—	Early 19th century	A stone house with stone gutter brackets, a stone slate roof, and two storeys. There is one single-light window at the rear, and the other windows are mullioned.	II
303 and 305 Blackmoorfoot Road, Crosland Moor; 53.63622°N 1.81284°W	—	Early 19th century	A pair of stone houses in a terrace, with stone gutter brackets, and a stone slate roof. There are two storeys, most of the windows are mullioned, and there is on single-light window.	II
41 and 43 Crosland Hill Road, Crosland Moor; 53.63133°N 1.82424°W	—	Early 19th century	A pair of stone houses with a stone slate roof. There are two storeys, the doorways to the right have stone surrounds, and the windows are mullioned, with some mullions removed.	II
33 and 35 Park Road West, Crosland Moor; 53.63849°N 1.81135°W	—	Early 19th century	A pair of stone houses with a stone slate roof and two storeys. Each house has a doorway to the left with a stone surround, and mullioned windows; a four-light window in the ground floor, and a two-light and a three-light window in the upper floor.	II
100 Bentley Street, Lockwood; 53.63200°N 1.79770°W	—	Early 19th century	A stone house on a corner site, with a moulded eaves cornice, and a hipped slate roof. There are two storeys, and two bays on each front with a curved corner between. The doorway has Tuscan pilasters, a full entablature, and a blocking course. The windows on Bentley Street are sashes, and on Meltham Road they are modern replacements.	II
1 Bridge Street, Lockwood; 53.63249°N 1.79521°W		Early 19th century	A shop in stone with a moulded cornice over the ground floor, a moulded eaves cornice, a blocking course, and a stone slate roof. There are three storeys and two bays. In the ground floor is a contemporary shop front with pilasters and a moulded cornice, and a doorway with a fanlight. The upper floors contain casement windows.	II
5, 15 and 15A Bridge Street, Lockwood; 53.63265°N 1.79535°W		Early 19th century	Three shops in a row, they are in stone, each with a moulded cornice above the ground floor, a moulded eaves cornice and blocking course, and a stone slate roof. There are three storeys, and each shop has two bays. In the ground floor are contemporary shop fronts with pilasters and a moulded cornice, and the upper floors contain sash windows.	II
7 and 13 Bridge Street, Lockwood; 53.63265°N 1.79541°W	—	Early 19th century	Shops in a row, they are in stone, each with a moulded cornice above the ground floor, a moulded eaves cornice and blocking course, and a stone slate roof. There are three storeys, and each shop has two bays. In the ground floor are contemporary shop fronts with pilasters and a moulded cornice, and the upper floors contain sash windows.	II
9, 11 and 11A Bridge Street, Lockwood; 53.63259°N 1.79532°W	—	Early 19th century	Two shops in a row, they are in stone, each with a moulded cornice above the ground floor, a moulded eaves cornice and blocking course, and a stone slate roof. There are three storeys, and each shop has two bays. In the ground floor are contemporary shop fronts with pilasters and a moulded cornice, and the upper floors contain sash windows.	II
19 Bridge Street, Lockwood; 53.63271°N 1.79545°W	—	Early 19th century	A shop in stone with a moulded cornice over the ground floor, a moulded eaves cornice, a blocking course, and a stone slate roof. There are three storeys and two bays. In the ground floor is a contemporary shop front with pilasters and a moulded cornice, and two doorways with fanlights. The upper floors contain sash windows.	II
21 Bridge Street, Lockwood; 53.63279°N 1.79545°W	—	Early 19th century	A stone shop with a sill band, stone gutter brackets, and a stone slate roof. There are two storeys, two bays, a doorway to the right, and shop windows.	II
3 Devonshire Street, Lockwood; 53.63346°N 1.79683°W	—	Early 19th century	A stone house with a stone slate roof, and three storeys. At the rear is a tripartite sash window, and the other windows are mullioned, including a six-light window in the top floor at the front.	II
2–10 Meltham Road, Lockwood; 53.63305°N 1.79572°W		Early 19th century	A terrace of five shops and houses with a sill band, stone gutter brackets, a hipped slate roof, and two storeys. No. 2 is a corner shop with two bays on Meltham Road, one on Swan Lane, and a curved corner containing a doorway. In the ground floor are shop windows, and the upper floor contains sash windows. The other buildings have basements, two bays each, steps leading up to doorways with stone surrounds and fanlights, and most of the windows are sashes. Four of the buildings have cast iron railings surrounding the basement areas.	II
34–40 Meltham Road, Lockwood; 53.63256°N 1.79664°W	—	Early 19th century	A terrace of four stone houses with a sill band, stone gutter brackets, and a stone slate roof. There are two storeys, and each house has two bays, a doorway to the right, with pilasters, a rectangular fanlight, and a segmental pediment, and the windows are sashes.	II
40A, 42 and 44 Meltham Road, Lockwood; 53.63221°N 1.79727°W	—	Early 19th century	A terrace of stone house with stone gutter brackets and a hipped stone slate roof. There are two storeys, eight bays on Meltham Road, two on Bentley street, and a curved corner. The doorways of Nos. 42 and 44 have moulded cornices, and to the left of No. 42 is a passageway door with a blind semicircular fanlight and moulded voussoirs.	II
46 Meltham Road, Lockwood; 53.63192°N 1.79783°W	—	Early 19th century	A stone house in a terrace, with a moulded eaves cornice and a stone slate roof. There are two storeys and three bays. The central doorway has a fanlight and a moulded cornice, and the windows are sashes.	II
198 Meltham Road, Lockwood; 53.62224°N 1.80664°W	—	Early 19th century	A stone house with stone gutter brackets and a stone slate roof. There are two storeys and three bays. The doorway has a rectangular fanlight, the windows on the front are sashes, and at the rear are mullioned windows and a round-arched staircase window.	II
9 and 10 Neale Road, Lockwood; 53.63335°N 1.79633°W	—	Early 19th century	A pair of mirror image stone houses with a stone slate roof. There are two storeys, and each house has two bays. The doorways are in the outer bays, and the windows are mullioned, with two three-light windows in the ground floor and four two-light windows in the upper floor.	II
15 and 17 Swan Lane, Lockwood; 53.63337°N 1.79630°W	—	Early 19th century	A pair of stone houses, with a stone slate roof and two storeys. The windows are mullioned, and each house has a three-light window in the ground floor and two two-light windows in the upper floor.	II
Benvenuto; 53.63277°N 1.80425°W	—	Early 19th century	A pair of stone houses, one rendered, with a stone slate roof. There are two storeys, and the windows are mullioned.	II
Farm buildings, Crosland Hall; 53.63062°N 1.82407°W	—	Early 19th century (probable)	The range of farm buildings is in stone and has a stone slate roof with coped gables. The barn has two storeys, the other buildings have one storey, and they contain various openings.	II
Crosland Hall Cottage; 53.63029°N 1.82430°W	—	Early 19th century	A stone house with a stone slate roof and two storeys. In the upper floor are mullioned windows, two with two lights and two with three lights, and the ground floor has been altered.	II
Crosland Lodge; 53.63899°N 1.80914°W		Early 19th century	A house, later used for other purposes, it is in stone, with an ornamental moulded eaves cornice that becomes pediment-shaped over each bay. It is in Classical style, with two storeys, six bays on the front, and three on the sides. The central porch has four fluted columns, a full entablature rising to a semicircle in the centre, and is approached by steps with ramped flanking walls and dies with sculpted wreaths. The windows are sashes, those in the ground floor with moulded surrounds and cornices.	II
Dryclough Hotel; 53.63276°N 1.81413°W	—	Early 19th century	The hotel, which has been extended at both ends, is in stone with a stone slate roof. There are two storeys, and the extension to the east has one storey. Most of the windows are mullioned, with some lights blocked and some mullions removed, and there is a casement window.	II
Lockwood and Salford Liberal Club; 53.63322°N 1.79680°W	—	Early 19th century	The building is in stone with a stone slate roof and two storeys. There are three four-light mullioned windows in the upper floor and one in the ground floor, and in the ground floor are a bipartite and a tripartite sash window.	II
Office Block, Lockwood Brewery; 53.63063°N 1.79889°W	—	Early 19th century	The office block is in stone with a moulded eaves cornice, parapets, and a stone slate roof. There are two storeys and five bays. In the centre is a porch with paired unfluted Greek Doric columns, a frieze with sculpted wreaths, and a pediment, and the doorway has a moulded surround. The windows are sashes with plain raised surrounds.	II
Principal Building, Park Valley Mills; 53.62509°N 1.80403°W	—	Early 19th century	The building is in stone, and has a slate roof with coped gables. There are four storeys, 17 bays on the front, and four on the sides. In the north gable end is a Venetian window.	II
Woodfield House; 53.62544°N 1.80885°W	—	Early 19th century	A stone house with a sill band, a moulded eaves cornice, and a hipped slate roof. There are two storeys and five bays. In the centre is a Tuscan porch with a pediment, the doorway has a semicircular fanlight, and moulded imposts, and the windows are sashes.	II
Works, Manchester Road; 53.64031°N 1.79741°W	—	Early 19th century	The works are in stone with a moulded eaves cornice, and a slate roof with coped gables. There are two storeys and ten bays. In the centre is a pediment-shaped gable with an oculus with a moulded surround. The works contain two carriage entrances with depressed arches, one blocked.	II
Holy Trinity Church, South Crosland; 53.61127°N 1.82363°W		1827–30	The church was designed by Peter Atkinson junior in Early English style. It is built in stone with a slate roof, and consists of a nave, a south porch, a chancel, a northeast vestry, and a west tower. The tower has clasping buttresses, a plain parapet and large pinnacles with pyramidal caps. The windows in the church are lancets, and inside the church are galleries on three sides.	II
Wall and gates, Holy Trinity Church; 53.61109°N 1.82349°W	—	1827–30 (presumed)	A stone wall extends along the south side of the churchyard, and in the corners are gateways. Each gateway has a pair of piers with ball finials, and between them are ornamental cast iron overthrows, the gate at the southeast also with a lamp. The gates are in cast iron with fleur-de-lys finials.	II
23 Bridge Street, Lockwood; 53.63284°N 1.79553°W	—	1828	A stone shop with a sill band, stone gutter brackets, and a hipped stone slate roof. There are two storeys, two bays on Bridge Street, and a curved bay to the right containing a doorway. In the ground floor are shop windows, and the upper floor contains sash windows.	II
1 Meltham Road, Lockwood; 53.63285°N 1.79561°W		1828	A shop in stone, with a sill band, stone gutter brackets, and a stone slate roof. There are two storeys, and three bays. In the centre is a doorway with a stone surround, flanked by shop windows, and in the upper floor are sash windows.	II
National School, South Crosland; 53.61146°N 1.82261°W	—	1835	The school is in stone, and has a tile roof with coped gables. There is one storey and a U-shaped plan, with a hall range and projecting gabled wings. The windows are lancets, some with voussoirs. Across the front of the school is a low wall with cast iron railings and ornamental finials.	II
25, 27, 29, 33 and 35 Bank End and Lea Lane, Netherton; 53.61103°N 1.81467°W		Early to mid 19th century	Originally three weavers' houses, later divided, they are in stone with moulded gutter brackets, and a stone slate roof. There are four storeys, and each house has two bays. The ground floor has been altered, including the addition of a modern porch. Each of the houses has a two-light and a three-light mullioned window in all three floors.	II
49, 51, 53, 55, 57, 59, 61, 63A and 63B Bank End, Netherton; 53.61055°N 1.81457°W		Early to mid 19th century	A terrace of six weavers' houses, later divided, they are in stone with a stone slate roof. There are three storeys, and a basement to No. 63. Each house has a doorway with a stone surround, most of the windows are mullioned, with some mullions removed, and there are single-light windows.	II
12–18 Netherton Fold, Netherton; 53.61322°N 1.81461°W	—	Early to mid 19th century (probable)	A row of three stone houses, that have a stone slate roof with coped gables. There are two storeys, and each house has two bays. The doorways and windows have stone surrounds, and the windows are sashes.	II
2 Miles Post; 53.61159°N 1.82035°W		Early to mid 19th century	The milestone is on the southeast of the B6108 road south of South Crosland. It consists of an upright stone with a round-headed top, inscribed with the distances to Huddersfield and Meltham.	II
Former stable, Lockwood Brewery; 53.62995°N 1.80000°W	—	1849	The building is in stone with a band, stone gutter brackets, and a stone slate roof. There are two storeys, and the windows are modern. The semicircular-arched entrance has a rusticated surround and a dated keystone with a clock face above. At the is a gable on paired consoles, and this is surmounted by an arched bellcote.	II
Lockwood Baptist Chapel; 53.63369°N 1.79511°W		1850	The chapel is in stone with angle pilasters, a moulded eaves cornice and blocking course, and a slate roof. There are two storeys, an entrance front of three bays, and six bays along the sides. The entrance front has a pedimented gable with an inscribed plaque in the tympanum. In the centre is a Tuscan porch with an entablature, and double doors with a fanlight, and the flanking windows have flat heads and moulded surrounds. In the middle of the upper floor is an overarched Venetian window, and the outer windows have round-arched heads.	II
54 Blackmoorfoot Road, Crosland Moor; 53.63871°N 1.80611°W	—	Mid 19th century	Once a lodge for Crosland Lodge, it is a stone house with an octagonal plan, and a pyramidal stone slate roof with overhanging eaves and bargeboards. There is one storey, and the windows are sashes with hood moulds.	II
100 Blackmoorfoot Road, Crosland Moor; 53.63811°N 1.80846°W		Mid 19th century	Once a lodge for Crosland Lodge, it is astone house with an octagonal plan, and a pyramidal stone slate roof with overhanging eaves and bargeboards. There is one storey, and the windows are sashes with hood moulds.	II
126 Blackmoorfoot Road, Crosland Moor; 53.63757°N 1.81003°W	—	19th century	Once a lodge for Crosland Lodge, it is a stone house in a terrace, with stone gutter brackets and a stone slate roof. There are two storeys, and the windows are mullioned, with four lights in the ground floor and six in the upper floor.	II
65 Bentley Street, Lockwood; 53.63221°N 1.79754°W	—	19th century	A stone house in a terrace, with stone gutter brackets and a stone slate roof. There are two storeys and three bays, and the windows are sashes.	II
24 School Hill, South Crosland; 53.61414°N 1.83282°W	—	19th century	A stone house with a stone slate roof and two storeys. The windows are mullioned, with a six-light window in the ground floor, two three-light window in the upper floor, and a two-light window above a doorway in the right return.	II
271 Manchester Road, Thornton Lodge; 53.63972°N 1.80082°W	—	19th century	A stone house with an octagonal plan, and a pyramidal slate roof with an ornamental wooden valence. There is one storey and a canted end. The windows are paired casements with arched heads in oblong frames with hood moulds.	II
Barn north of 23 Midmay; 53.61102°N 1.82799°W	—	19th century (probable)	The barn is in stone with a stone slate roof, two storeys, and a lean-to outshut along the east side. It contains sash windows, a barn door and a stable door.	II
Birkhouse Lane Bridge; 53.64064°N 1.80086°W		19th century	The bridge carries Birkhouse Lane over the Huddersfield Narrow Canal. It is in red brick with blue headers and dressings, and consists of a single depressed arch. The bridge has a band, a parapet and blue brick coping.	II
Dryclough Farmhouse, barn and cartshed 53.63233°N 1.81625°W	—	19th century (or earlier	The farmhouse, barn and cartshed are in a single range, and are in stone with a stone slate roof. The house has two storeys, and contains mullioned windows. The barn to the west has segmental-headed doorways and a red brick outshut, and the cartshed to the east has one storey and a lean-to roof.	II
Lamp post, Netherton; 53.61404°N 1.81418°W	—	Mid 19th century	The lamp post is at a road junction, and has a stone base, square at the bottom with chamfered corners, bulbous at the top, and with four spur stones at the base. The upper part is in iron, with a moulded plinth, and a stem and cross bar with acanthus ornament.	II
Milestone; 53.62148°N 1.80549°W		19th century	The milestone is on the east side of Meltham Road (B6108 road) opposite the entrance to the drive of No. 198 Meltham Road. It consists of an upright stone with a rounded top, inscribed with the distances to Huddersfield and to Meltham.	II
Netherton Well; 53.61371°N 1.81590°W		19th century	The well-head and its retaining walls are in stone. The well-head has a monolithic sill and lintel, flat coping and pyramidal end stones. The wall has a slightly taller central section, with quadrant walls sloping down to the road. The area in front of the well-head is partly paved, and there is a low wall with chamfered coping.	II
Vicarage, South Crosland; 53.61176°N 1.82231°W	—	Mid 19th century	The vicarage is in stone with a band, and a tile roof with coped gables and moulded kneelers. There are two storeys and a front of three bays, the right bay projecting and gabled. The doorway has a semicircular fanlight in a portal with a blocking course and a pediment-shaped acroterion. The windows are sashes. The east front has two projecting bays with pediment-shaped acroteria.	II
Odd Fellows Hall; 53.61425°N 1.81232°W		1854	The hall is in stone, with a moulded eaves cornice and blocking course, and there are two storeys. The middle three bays project under a pediment with a roundel in the tympanum, under it is a frieze containing the name of the building, and a central doorway. The central portion is flanked by five-bay wings, and the windows are sashes with moulded surrounds.	II
Lockwood Methodist Church; 53.63251°N 1.79763°W		1864	The church, later used for other purposes, is in stone, with rusticated corner pilasters, a bracketed and moulded cornice, and a slate roof. There is one storey, an entrance front of three bays, and five bays along the sides. The entrance front has a pediment and in the tympanum is an inscribed plaque. The central doorway has Tuscan pilasters, a full entablature, moulded imposts and voussoirs, a keystone and spandrels. The flanking windows and the windows along the sides have round-arched heads.	II
Mechanics' Institute; 53.63241°N 1.79708°W		1865	The building is in stone, the ground floor rusticated, with a moulded cornice over the ground floor, a sill band, a moulded eaves cornice with brackets, and a hipped stone slate roof. There are two storeys, a symmetrical front of three bays, and four bays along the sides. In the centre is a doorway with paired Doric columns, a fanlight, and a full entablature with a blocking course. The windows in the ground floor have flat heads, and in the upper floor they have round-arched heads with moulded voussoirs and keystones. Along the top of the building is a frieze with the name of the building.	II
16A and 18 Swan Lane, Lockwood; 53.63386°N 1.79759°W		1866	Originally the town hall, the building is in stone, with a rusticated ground floor on a moulded plinth, a moulded cornice over the ground floor, a moulded sill band and impost band, a moulded eaves cornice, stone gutter brackets, and a hipped slate roof. There are two storeys, six bays on the front, the middle two bays projecting under a pediment containing a cartouche, and two bays on the left side, with a one bay extension. In the ground floor there are six arches containing doorways and windows, and the upper floor contains round-arched sash windows with panelled aprons, moulded voussoirs, and keystones.	II
Lodge, Beaumont Park; 53.62614°N 1.81066°W		1883	The park lodge is in stone on a plinth with chamfered quoins, and deeply overhanging eaves with embossed decoration and wooden brackets, and a Westmorland slate roof. There is one storey and an attic. In the entrance front is a projecting wing with a bow window, a cross window with a moulded surround, and an eaves dormer with a pediment, and there are similar windows elsewhere.	II
