= Odd Fellows Hall, Netherton =

Odd Fellows' Hall
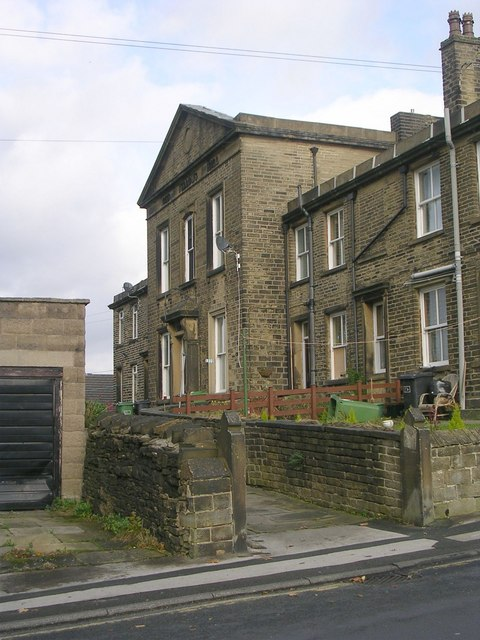

- Location in West Yorkshire
- 53.614149°N 1.8122999°W
- Location: 41, 43, 45, and 47 Moor Lane, Netherton, West Yorkshire
- OS grid reference: SE 12515 13083

History
- Built: 1855
- Built for: Lodge 499 of the Oddfellows' Society

Listed Building – Grade II
- Designated: 29 September 1978
- Reference no.: 1287493

The Odd Fellows' Hall in Netherton, Kirklees is a Grade II Listed building constructed in 1855 by the Odd Fellows Society.

== Architecture ==
The building was designed by James Pigott Pritchett. Development originally begun at Blue Slates, Netherton in summer 1854 but this was halted in December due to problems with the foundations. The new location of the Hall was selected and building was completed in summer 1855.

The building comprises a hall and several cottages in hammer-dressed stone. The front building has a pediment with a central roundel containing the words "Odd Fellows Hall".
