= John Henry Middleton =

British archaeologist and museum director

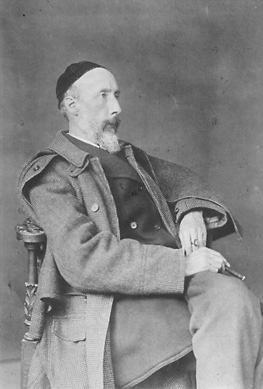
- John Henry Middleton, Director of the Art Museum (Division of the Victoria and Albert Museum) 1893–1896 Photographer R.N.H. Stiles
- Born: 5 October 1846; York, England
- Died: 10 June 1896 (aged 49)
- Education: Exeter College, Oxford; Royal Academy
- Known for: Director of the Fitzwilliam Museum; Director of the Victoria and Albert Museum
- Spouse: Bella Stillman

John Henry Middleton (5 October 1846 – 10 June 1896) was an archaeologist and a museum director.

== Early years ==
He was born in York on 5 October 1846, John Henry Middleton was the only surviving child of John Middleton and Maria Margaret, daughter of James Pigott Pritchett and his first wife, Peggy Maria Terry. As a child, he travelled to Italy where he was initially educated. He acquired a love for Italy and its language, which lasted throughout his life. On returning to Britain his parents settled in Cheltenham, where his father practised as an architect and where he attended Cheltenham College. In 1865, he was matriculated at Exeter College, Oxford. The following year, however, he suffered a severe depression accentuated by the sudden death of a close friend at Oxford. This led to him confining himself to his room for six years. During this time, through reading and study, he laid the foundations of his extensive knowledge of art and archaeology.

== Travels ==
On his recovery, Middleton began a series of journeys around the world. He visited the Americas, including Salt Lake City and the Rocky Mountains, and travelled south from there into Mexico. He travelled in Greece, Asia Minor, Egypt, and North Africa. He undertook a special journey to Fez in Morocco to study the philosophy of Plato as taught there, while there he secured entrance to the Great Mosque by posing as an Islamic pilgrim.

== Architect ==
When he returned to Britain he adopted the profession of an architect and apprenticed in the office of Sir George Gilbert Scott, and then as a partner in his father's business at Storey's Gate, Westminster. After his father's death in 1885, he liquidated the firm and began life as a professional archaeologist.

== Art and archaeology ==
Middleton never ceased to pursue his favourite studies of art and archaeology, and even went through a course in the schools of the Royal Academy. His vast knowledge became well known and brought him many friends including William Morris, with whom Middleton travelled in Iceland. In 1879, he was elected fellow of the Society of Antiquaries, and was a frequent contributor to their publications; in 1894, he was elected as vice-president of the society. He also contributed to the 9th edition of the Encyclopædia Britannica. In 1885, he published his book Ancient Rome, looking at antiquities of Rome, which was followed in 1892 by the Remains of Ancient Rome. From 1886 to 1892, he was Slade professor of fine art at Cambridge. He was given an honorary MA degree at Cambridge in 1886, and in 1887 one from Oxford, followed by a Litt.D. at Cambridge in 1893 and a DCL at Oxford in 1894. He was also honoured with a doctor's degree at the University of Bologna and in 1888 elected a fellow of King's College, Cambridge.

== Museum director ==
In 1889, Middleton was named Director of the Fitzwilliam Museum in Cambridge. As director, he was able to show his knowledge and produced the catalogue Engraved Gems of Classical Times in 1891, Illuminated MSS of Classical and Mediaeval Times in 1892 as well as a catalogue of The Lewis Collection of Gems. Middleton was also appointed as lecturer at the Royal Academy.

In 1892, he was appointed Director of the art collections of the South Kensington Museum (now the Victoria and Albert Museum), at the time the department was in need of reform and reorganisation. He brought in several necessary reforms, but the difficult work coupled with his lifelong depression and drug addiction, increased his despondency and drug use.

He accidentally overdosed on morphia at the age of 49 and died on 10 June 1896. His body was cremated at Woking, and his remains were interred at Brookwood cemetery.

== Family ==
In 1892, he married Bella Stillman, they had one child.

== Sources ==
- L. H. Cust, rev. Richard Smail (2004). "Middleton, John Henry (1846–1896)". Oxford Dictionary of National Biography. Oxford University Press.
- Dictionary of Art Historians
- V&A Directors
