= James Pigott Pritchett Jr =

British architect (1830–1911)

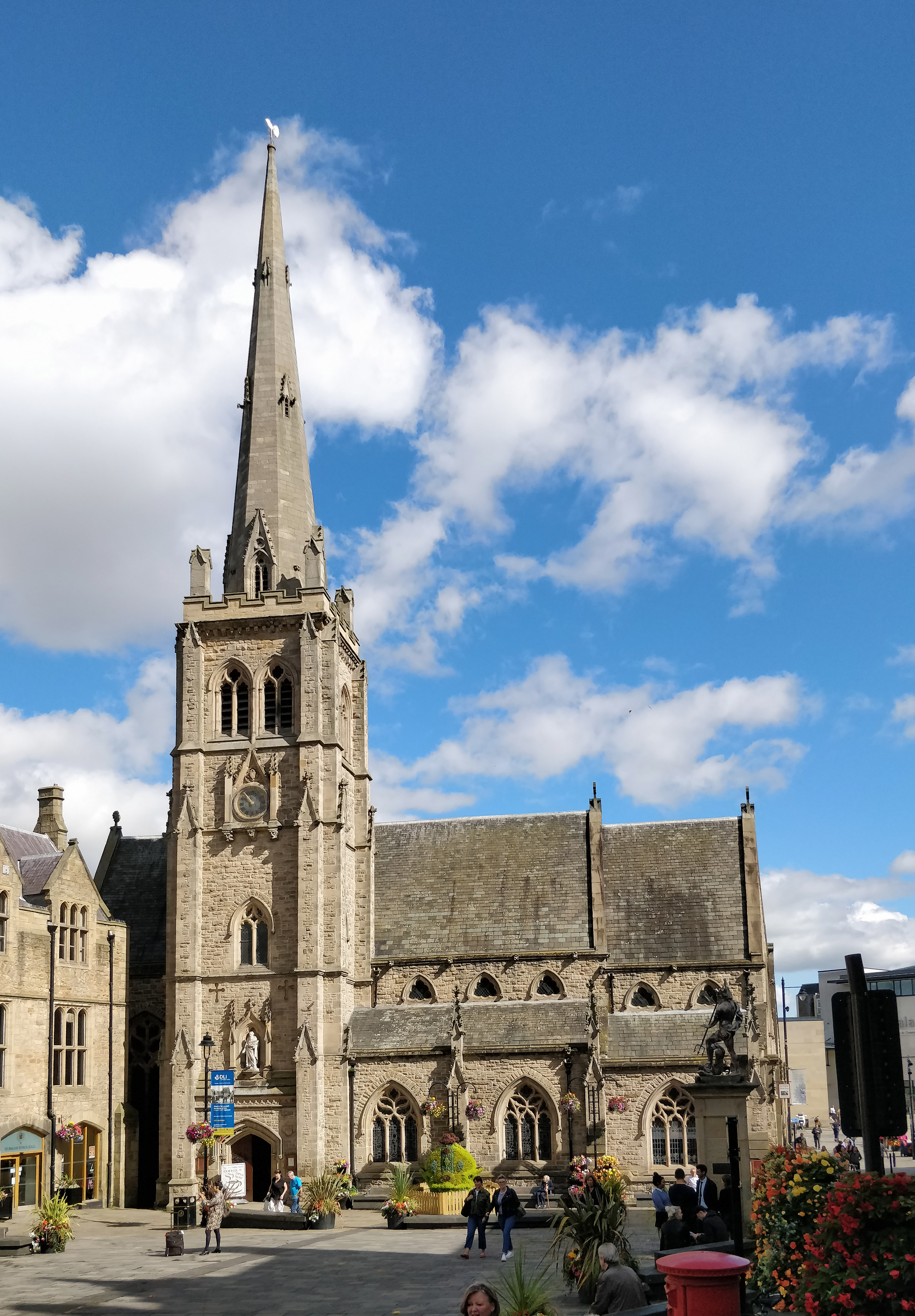
Pritchett's church of St Nicholas, Durham

James Pigott Pritchett FRIBA (14 May 1830 – 22 September 1911), known as J P Pritchett junior or J P Pritchett of Darlington, was a British architect.

== Biography ==
=== Early life ===
He was born in York, the son of architect James Pigott Pritchett senior (1789–1868) and his second wife Caroline Benson. He was educated at St Peter's School, York, before being articled to his father's architectural firm in 1845. He travelled in Europe, the Near East and Africa.

=== Career ===
In 1854, he succeeded to the architectural practice of his brother-in-law John Middleton in Darlington, where he would continue to work until his retirement.

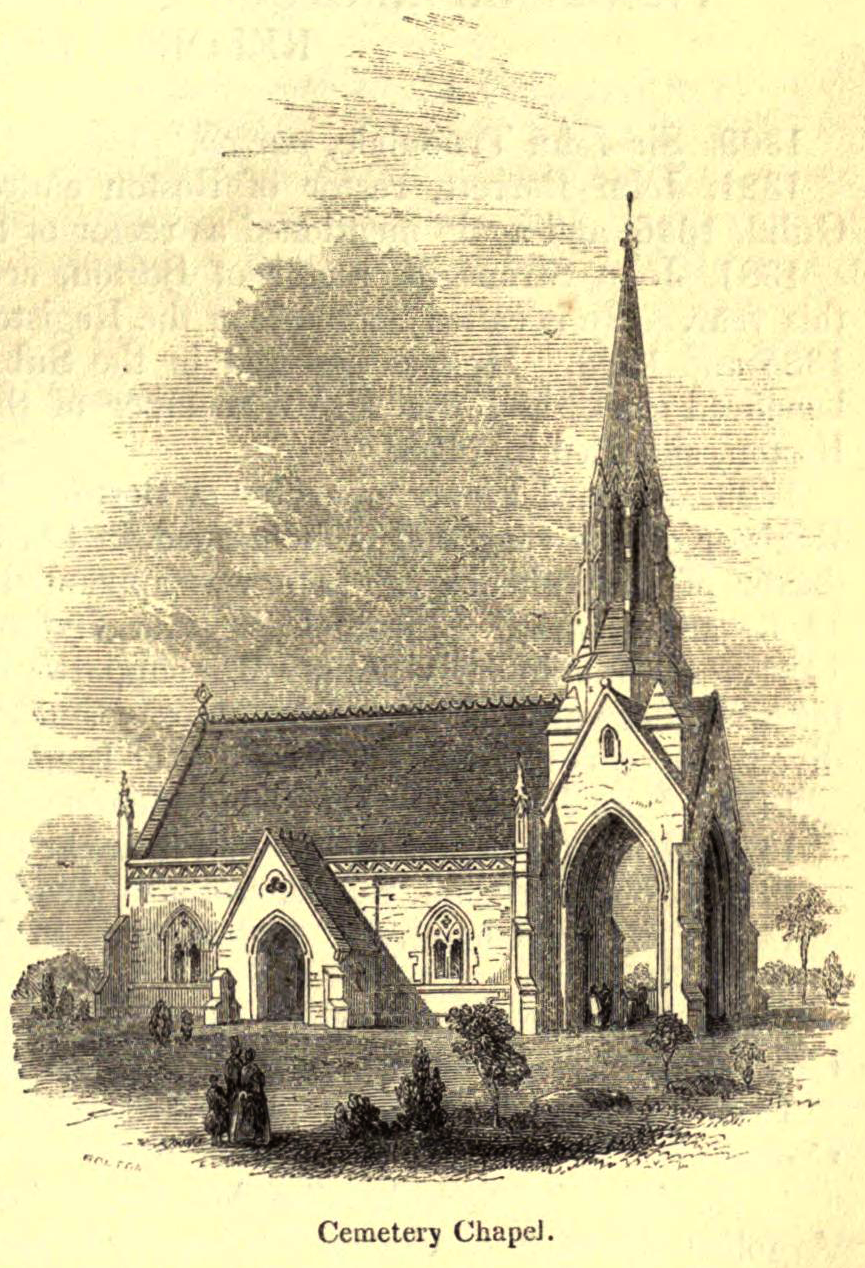
Contemporary engraving of Pritchett's chapel at Boston Cemetery

The same year, his father's firm, Pritchett & Sons of York, won a competition to design two chapels, a lodge and entrance gates for the new Boston Cemetery in Lincolnshire, but it was Pritchett junior who attended the meeting in July 1854 and was commissioned to prepare plans. He provided the layout for the grounds and plans for twin chapels and a lodge, all in the gothic style, which were constructed by 1855 when the Anglican chapel was consecrated and the first interment took place. The layout of the cemetery, lodge and Anglican chapel remain intact, though the identical nonconformist chapel was demolished in 1961.

Also in 1854, Pritchett was engaged to renovate the medieval St Nicholas Church, Durham, and when the building was found to be beyond repair he was commissioned to design a replacement. The new church was opened in 1858 and described by the Illustrated London News as "the most beautiful specimen of church architecture in the north of England".

He constructed over 100 more churches and during his career, and was particularly associated with churches in Darlington, although Nikolaus Pevsner believed that St Nicholas Durham remained among his best. He also designed the chapels and lodge at Darlington West Cemetery and around 20 other cemeteries.

He was a member of the Archaeological Society of Durham and Northumberland, a founding member of the Northern Architectural Association, and a Fellow of the Royal Institute of British Architects.

His son, Herbert Dewes Pritchett (born 1859) joined him in practice in 1880, and became a partner in 1900.

=== Death ===
Pritchett retired around 1910, and died in 1911 at Glendower, Teddington, London. His obituary in the Darlington & Stockton Times referred to him as "an architect of considerable ability". He was buried in Darlington West Cemetery, for which he designed the buildings.

== Notable works ==
- Boston Cemetery, 1855
- St Nicholas Church, Durham, 1858
- St Cuthbert's Church, Darlington (restoration, with George Gilbert Scott), 1864
- St Oswald, Fulford, 1866
- Reeth Evangelical Congregational Church, 1866
- Ilkley Congregational Church, West Yorkshire 1868-69
- Grange Chapel (now West Park United Reformed Church), Sunderland, 1883
