= St John's Church, Darlington =

St John the Evangelist's Church, Darlington
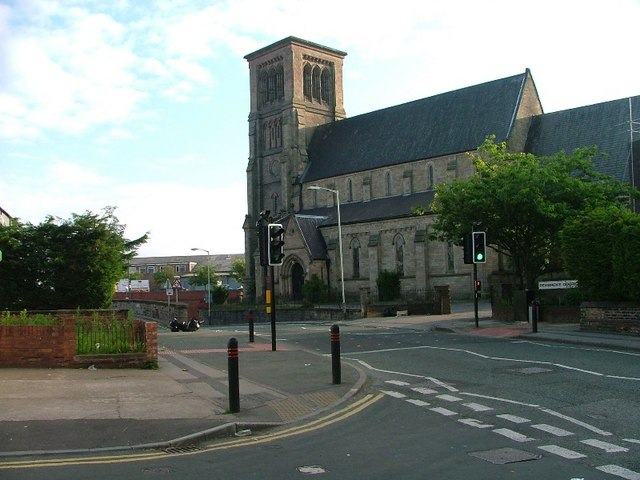
- St John the Evangelist's Church, Darlington

- Location within County Durham
- 54°31′22″N 1°32′35″W
- OS grid reference: NZ 29625 14275
- Location: Darlington
- Country: England
- Denomination: Church of England

History
- Status: Closed
- Dedication: Saint John the Evangelist
- Consecrated: 16 July 1853

Architecture
- Heritage designation: Grade II listed
- Architect: John Middleton
- Groundbreaking: 10 September 1847
- Completed: 3 January 1850
- Closed: 5 February 2023

Specifications
- Length: 106 feet (32 m)
- Width: 50 feet (15 m)
- Height: 60 feet (18 m)

Administration
- Diocese: Diocese of Durham
- Archdeaconry: Auckland
- Deanery: Darlington
- Parish: Saint John Darlington

St John the Evangelist's Church, Darlington is a Grade II listed former Church of England church on Neasham Road, Darlington, County Durham.

== History ==
The church was designed by John Middleton and built between 1847 and 1849. The foundation stone was laid on 10 September 1847 by George Hudson Esq M.P. The design included a spire projected to be 160 feet (49 m) high sitting on the 90 feet (27 m) tower, but this was never added.

The church opened for worship on 3 January 1850.

The debt took some time to pay off, but by 1853 the Bishop of Durham agreed to consecrate the church and it took place on 16 July 1853.

The vestries were added in 1900 by W.S. Hicks.

In December 2022, it was announced the church was to close due to declining congregation numbers and rising running costs, a final service was held on 5 February 2023.

== Organ ==
Initially services were accompanied by a Seraphine. A pipe organ was presented in 1857 by Nathaniel Plews, which was second hand from Bedale church. However, this proved to be unsatisfactory and in 1865 a new organ was installed by Mr. Nicholson of Newcastle upon Tyne which included parts from the old organ. The cost was £150.

This organ was replaced in 1890 when a 2 manual organ was built by H.S. Vincent and Company of Sunderland. The opening recital was given on 18 September 1890 by Philip Armes, organist of Durham Cathedral. A specification of the current organ can be found on the National Pipe Organ Register. It has been awarded a Grade II* listing by the British Institute of Organ Studies.

== Bells ==
The tower contains a ring of 8 bells. Five were installed in 1848 by Charles and George Mears. Three more were added in 1893 by Mears and Stainbank.
