= Longroyd Bridge =

Suburb of Huddersfield, West Yorkshire, England

Coordinates: 53.642°N 1.795°W

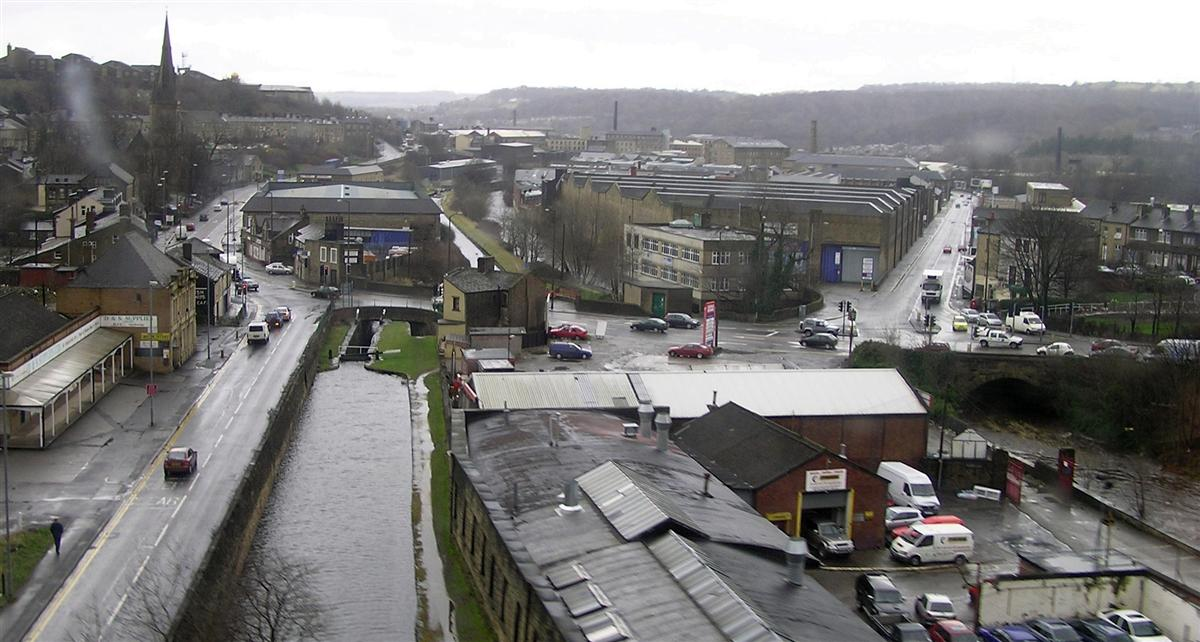
Longroyd Bridge showing route of A62 over the Canal and River Colne

Longroyd Bridge is a suburb approximately 1200 yds (1.1 km) to the southwest of Huddersfield town centre, West Yorkshire, England. The area is composed of industrial and commercial units. There is little housing in the commercial area, though within a few hundred yards are the housing areas of Thornton Lodge and Paddock.

The dominating feature of the area is the viaduct carrying the Sheffield—Huddersfield Penistone Line railway over the valley of the River Colne from the station at Lockwood to Springwood Junction and tunnel where the line continues under Greenhead to arrive at Huddersfield railway station.

Longroyd Bridge is where the A62, Manchester Road, route to Manchester passes over the Huddersfield Narrow Canal and the River Colne, it then travels down through the Colne Valley passing Milnsbridge, Linthwaite, and Slaithwaite to Marsden before crossing the Pennine hills to Oldham and Manchester.

The Huddersfield Narrow canal has been extensively reconstructed over the last few years, with long infilled stretches dug out again. In places this has required major civil engineering work to route the canal under buildings that had been constructed over the canal when it became disused. Also to replace newly constructed lock gates. Within the first year after re-opening the canal drained out, unexpectedly, leaving some narrowboats and leisure craft stranded for several days. Then again in early 2009 there was a leak, which again stranded boats.
