= Lockwood Town Hall =

Municipal building in Lockwood, Huddersfield, West Yorkshire, England

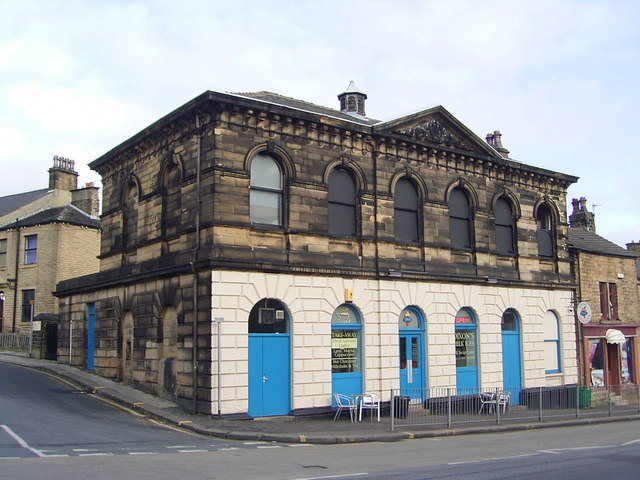
- The building in 2007

- Shown in West Yorkshire
- 53.6339°N 1.7976°W
- Location: Swan Lane, Lockwood, Huddersfield

History
- Built: 1866

Site notes
- Architectural style: Italianate style

Listed Building – Grade II
- Official name: 16A and 18 Swan Lane
- Designated: 29 September 1978
- Reference no.: 1239516

Lockwood Town Hall is a former municipal building in Swan Lane in Lockwood, Huddersfield, West Yorkshire, England. The former town hall, which is currently used as an ice cream factory, is a Grade II listed building.

== History ==
Following significant population growth, largely associated with the arrival of new factories in the area, the Lockwood Local Board was formed in February 1863. The board decided to commission a town hall at an early stage making it the first small local authority to decide to build a town hall. The site the local board selected had been occupied by an old school. The new town hall was designed in the Italianate style, built in ashlar stone from Crossland Hill and was completed in time for a meeting of the local board held on 14 May 1866.

However, the building ceased to be the local seat of government when township was merged into the Huddersfield on the incorporation of Huddersfield as a municipal borough in 1868. The building was later converted into a police station but also continued to be used for public meetings.

The building, which remained in the ownership of Huddersfield Corporation, became an ice cream factory, leased to Dixon's Milk Ices, a business established in the early 1960s. The building was grade II listed in 1978. The building's stonework, which had become discoloured over the years, was cleaned to remove intense soiling in the 1990s.

In 1891, a local milkman, George Frederick Laycock attended Lockwood Town Hall to vote with his goose, which had become fondly attached to Laycock, often joining him on his rounds but also attending the local pubs with him.

== Architecture ==
The design of the two-storey building involves a symmetrical main frontage of six bays facing onto Swan Lane. It is two bays deep, with a later single-storey extension on the North Street side. The ground floor is rusticated, with a cornice above. There are six round headed openings with voussoirs and keystones on the ground floor, and six round headed windows with architraves and keystones on the first floor. The two central bays, which are slightly projected forward, are surmounted by a pediment, with a cartouche with the words "Town 1866 Hall" as well as some sculpted foliage, in the tympanum. The building has a hipped slate roof.

== See also ==
- Listed buildings in Crosland Moor and Netherton
