= Christchurch, Ilkley =

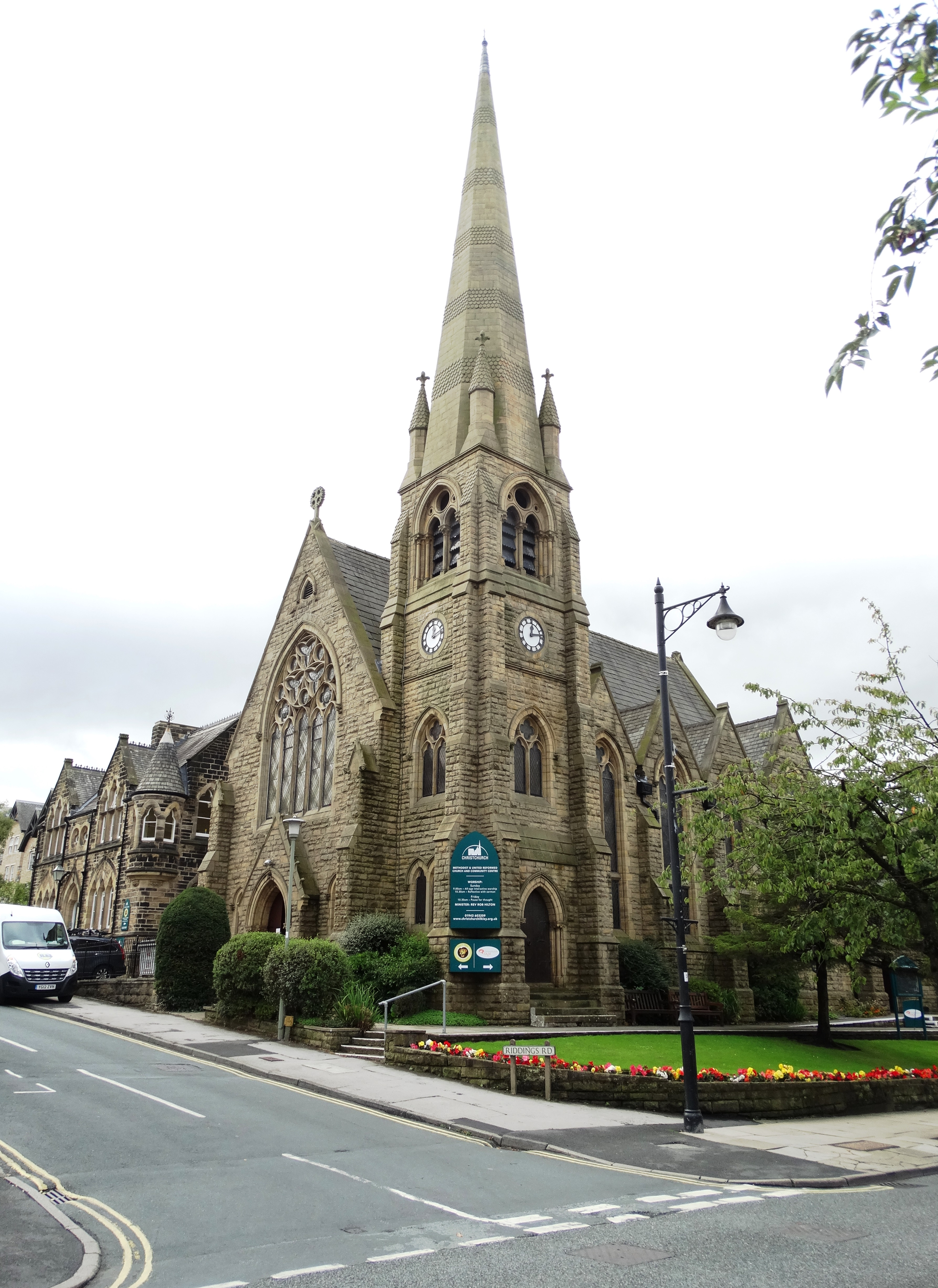
- Christchurch, Ilkley

- Location within West Yorkshire
- 53°55′27.9″N 1°49′28″W
- OS grid reference: SE 11613 47590
- Location: Ilkley, North Yorkshire
- Country: England
- Denomination: United Reformed and Methodist Local Ecumenical Partnership
- Previous denomination: Congregational
- Website: www.christchurchilkley.org.uk

Architecture
- Heritage designation: Grade II listed
- Architect: James Pigott Pritchett Jr
- Groundbreaking: 30 May 1868
- Completed: 16 June 1869

Christchurch, Ilkley is a Grade II listed United Reformed and Methodist ecumenical partnership church in Ilkley, North Yorkshire, England.

== History ==
The foundation stone of the church was laid by James Law, Mayor of Bradford, on 30 May 1868. The architect was James Pigott Pritchett Jr of Darlington and the cost was estimated at £5,000 (equivalent to £490,000 in 2025).

The design comprised a church, school and a church-keeper's house in the early decorated style of Gothic architecture. The main doorway was on Riddings Road. The tower was complete by 1869 but the 130 feet (40 m) spire was to be finished later The church building opened for worship on 16 June 1869.

In 1972 the union between the Presbyterian Church of England and the Congregational Church in England and Wales formed the United Reformed Church and from then it was known as Ilkley United Reformed Church.

Later it formed an ecumenical partnership with Ilkley Methodist Church.

== Organ ==
The church obtained a new organ at a cost of £464 (equivalent to £43,600 in 2025) in 1873 by the builder Forster and Andrews of Hull. This was replaced in 1911 by a new instrument by Harrison and Harrison of Durham. This organ is no longer present in the church.

== Clock ==
The clock by Potts of Leeds was installed in the tower in 1891 at a cost of £110 (equivalent to £12,100 in 2025). It was the gift of Mr. T.P. Muff of Woodbank.

== See also ==
- Listed buildings in Ilkley
