= St Luke's Hospital, Huddersfield =

St. Luke's Hospital
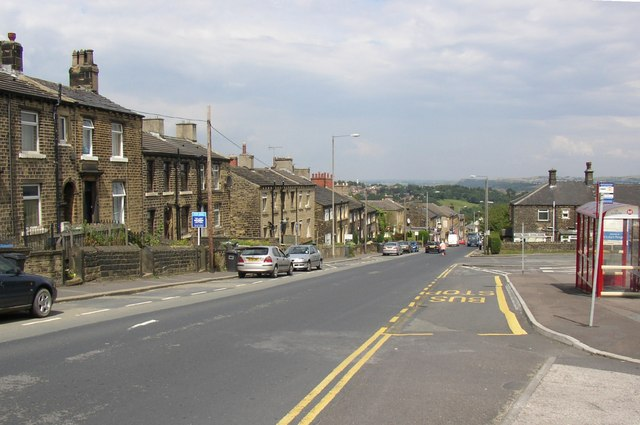
- The former entrance, on the right, to St. Luke's Hospital (now demolished)

- Shown in West Yorkshire

Geography
- Location: Huddersfield, England
- Coordinates: 53.635°N 1.811°W

Organisation
- Type: Mental health

History
- Founded: 1934
- Closed: 2011

St. Lukes Hospital was a large hospital in the English town of Huddersfield; it had approximately 850 beds for patient-care.

== History ==
Formerly a workhouse built in 1872, it was situated in the suburb of Crosland Moor and mostly provided geriatric and psychiatric care. It became St. Luke's Hospital in 1930 but it was not until 1934 before clinical service became generally available.

The hospital joined the National Health Service in 1948. The hospital closed in 2011 and the buildings on the site were partially demolished in early 2015. Planning applications for the 22-acre site include proposals for a mixture of housing and commercial units.
