= South Crosland =

Village in West Yorkshire, England

Coordinates: 53°36′N 1°49′W

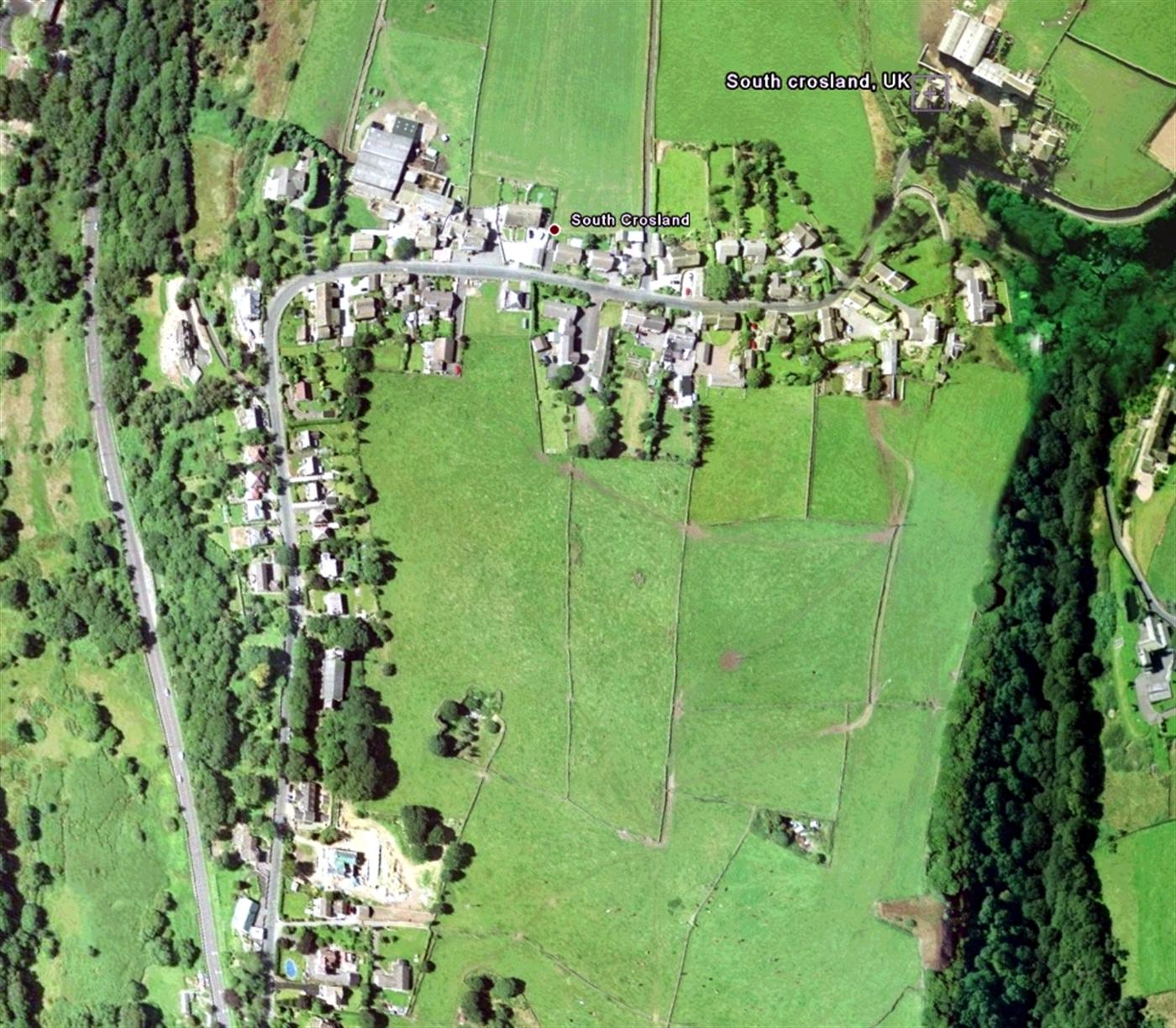
- Aerial view of South Crosland, Huddersfield (2006)

- Location within West Yorkshire
- Metropolitan borough: Kirklees
- Metropolitan county: West Yorkshire
- Region: Yorkshire and the Humber
- Country: England
- Sovereign state: United Kingdom
- Police: West Yorkshire
- Fire: West Yorkshire
- Ambulance: Yorkshire

South Crosland is a village in the metropolitan borough of Kirklees in West Yorkshire, England.

== History ==
South Crosland was formerly a township and chapelry in the parish of Almondbury. In 1866 South Crosland became a separate civil parish, and it became an urban district in 1894 under the Local Government Act 1894. The parish and urban district was abolished under a County Review Order on 1 April 1938, being split between the county borough of Huddersfield, the Meltham urban district, and the Holmfirth Urban District. In 1931 the parish had a population of 2985.

== See also ==
- Listed buildings in Crosland Moor and Netherton
