= York Arms =

Former pub in a listed terrace in York, England

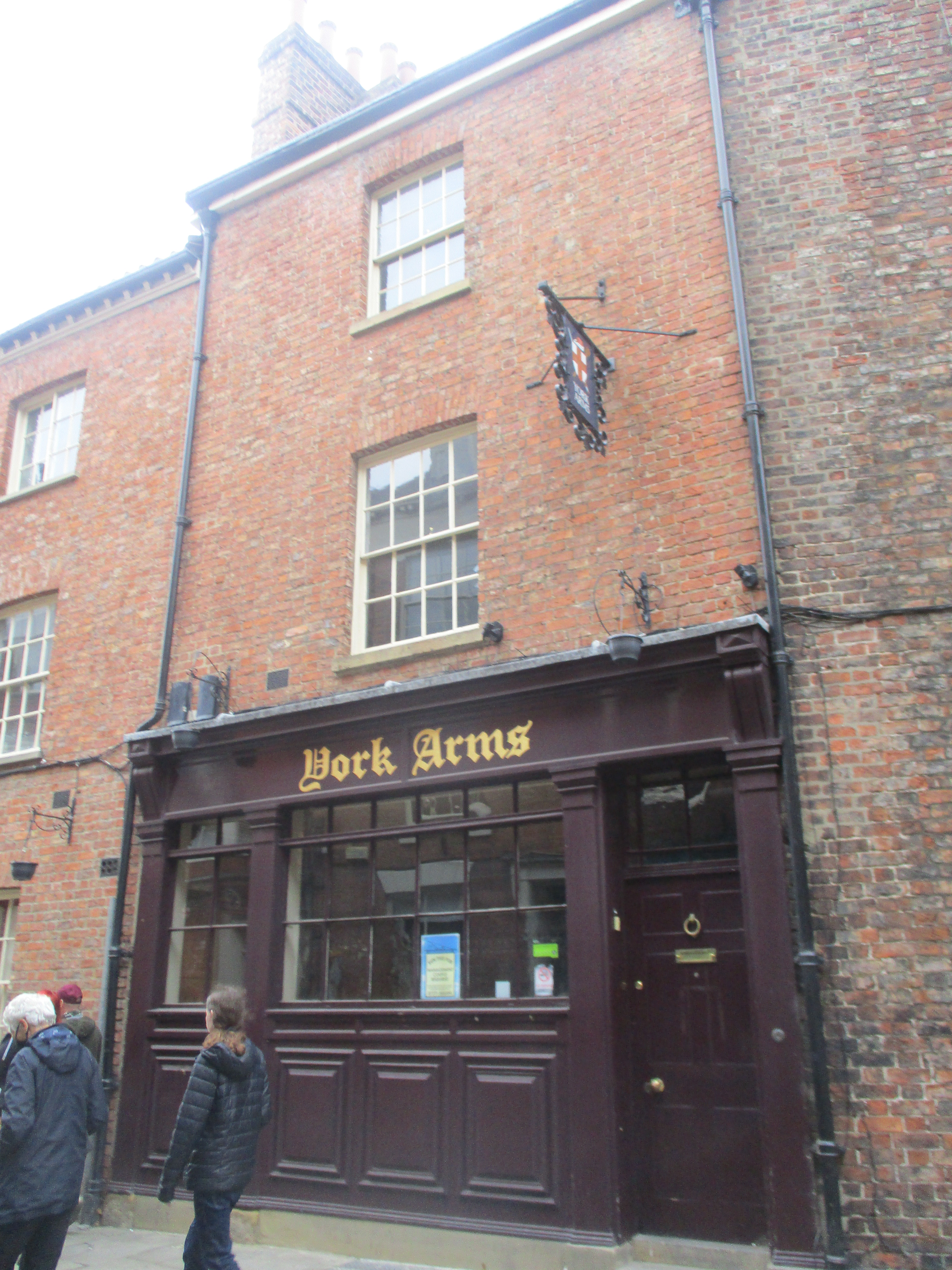
- The building in 2020, about a year after it closed
- Interactive map of the York Arms area
- Alternative names: 22–36 High Petergate and 1 Precentor's Court

General information
- Type: Public house (former)
- Location: 26 High Petergate, York, England
- Coordinates: 53.9624°N 1.0841°W
- Completed: c. 1838 (188 years ago)
- Renovated: c. 1855 (coffee house converted to public house); 20th century (shopfronts to Nos. 30 and 32)

Design and construction
- Architect: James Pigott Pritchett

Listed Building – Grade II
- Official name: York Arms (numbers 24 and 26)
- Designated: 1 July 1968
- Reference no.: 1257609

The York Arms is a historic building on High Petergate in the city of York, England. Designed by James Pigott Pritchett, it forms part of a seven-unit terrace at 24–36 High Petergate, a Grade II listed range dating from 1838 which faces south at No. 26 and is set between early-18th-century properties. The rear elevations on Precentor's Court are included within the same listing and were originally built as residences for canons of the adjacent York Minster.

The York Arms occupied No. 26 until its closure in the summer of 2019, after which it became involved in a High Court legal action. On the northern side of the range, at 1 Precentor's Court, the lodging‑house keeper John Knowles was recorded as living in 1872.

== Architecture ==
The buildings use orange‑grey brick on a painted stone base, with the Precentor's Court side built in orange‑brown brick laid in mixed patterns. No. 24 has a pantile roof, No. 1 Precentor's Court a plain tile roof, and the rest are slated, all with brick chimneys.

The High Petergate front has three storeys and cellars, arranged across nine units, with No. 24 set slightly lower than the others. At the left end, No. 24 has a passage entrance and a main door, each with six panels. No. 26 has a later inn frontage with simple uprights, a wide fascia and a shaped cornice; to the right is a six‑panel door, and to the left a small‑pane window above a raised panelled base. The fronts of Nos. 30 and 32 have panelled uprights, plate‑glass windows with timber sills, and a glazed door under a shallow cornice. The doors to Nos. 28, 34 and 36 are six‑panelled with divided overlights. Most first‑ and second‑floor windows are 16‑pane sashes, except at No. 24, which has two Yorkshire sashes on the top floor. All upper windows have painted stone sills and gently arched brick heads. No. 24 has a shaped eaves cornice, while the others have a simpler moulded one.

No. 1 Precentor's Court has three storeys and cellars with a two‑bay front. Steps lead to a six‑panel door in a timber surround beneath a dentilled hood, with a single fixed pane above. To the left is a blocked cellar opening with a shallow brick arch, and to the right a flat cellar opening with a grille. The ground‑floor window is a 20‑pane sash; the first floor has two small later openings beside a 12‑pane sash; and the second floor has a 16‑pane sash. The upper windows have flat brick heads, and the building finishes with a dentilled eaves cornice.

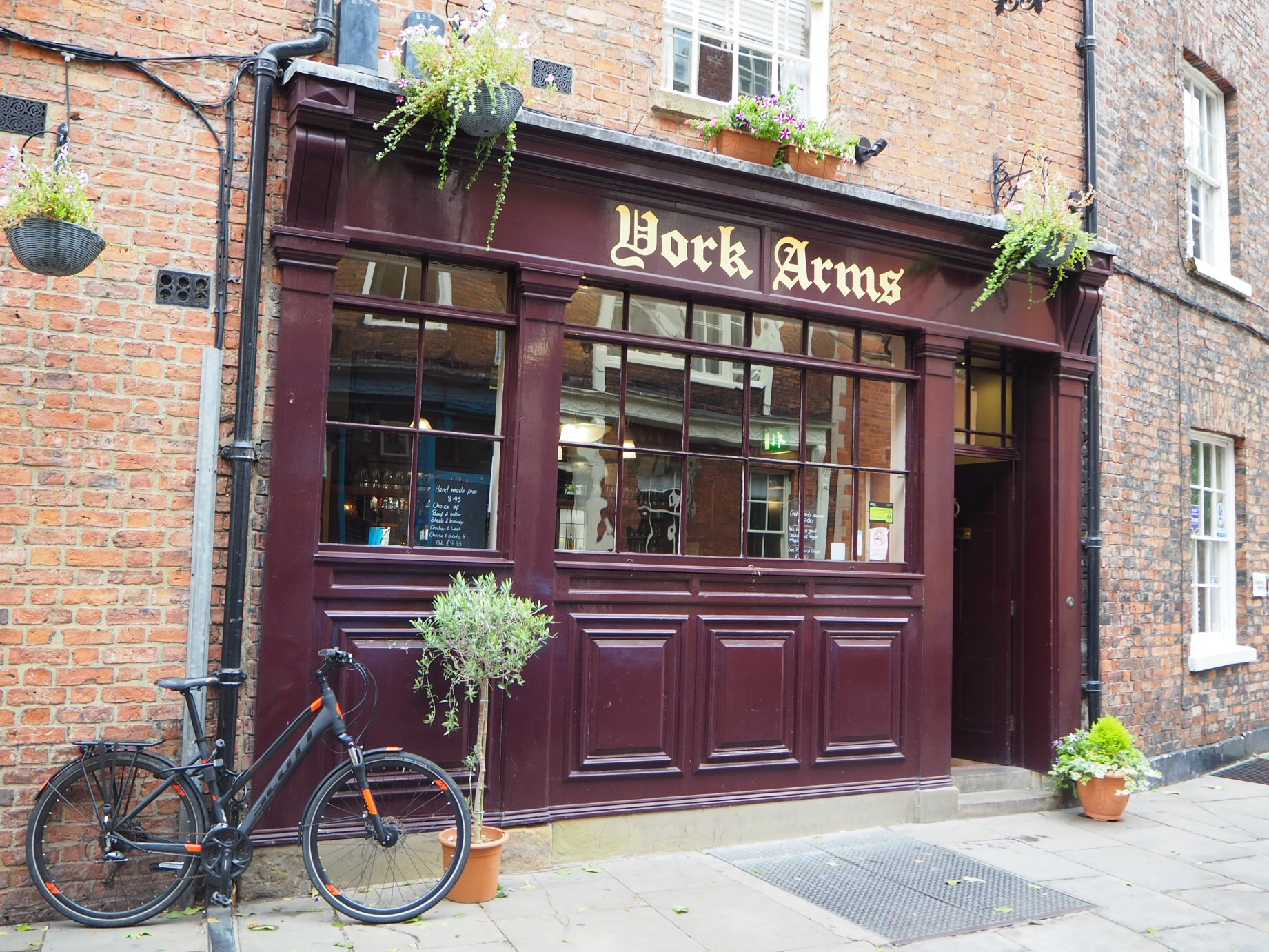
The York Arms in 2018

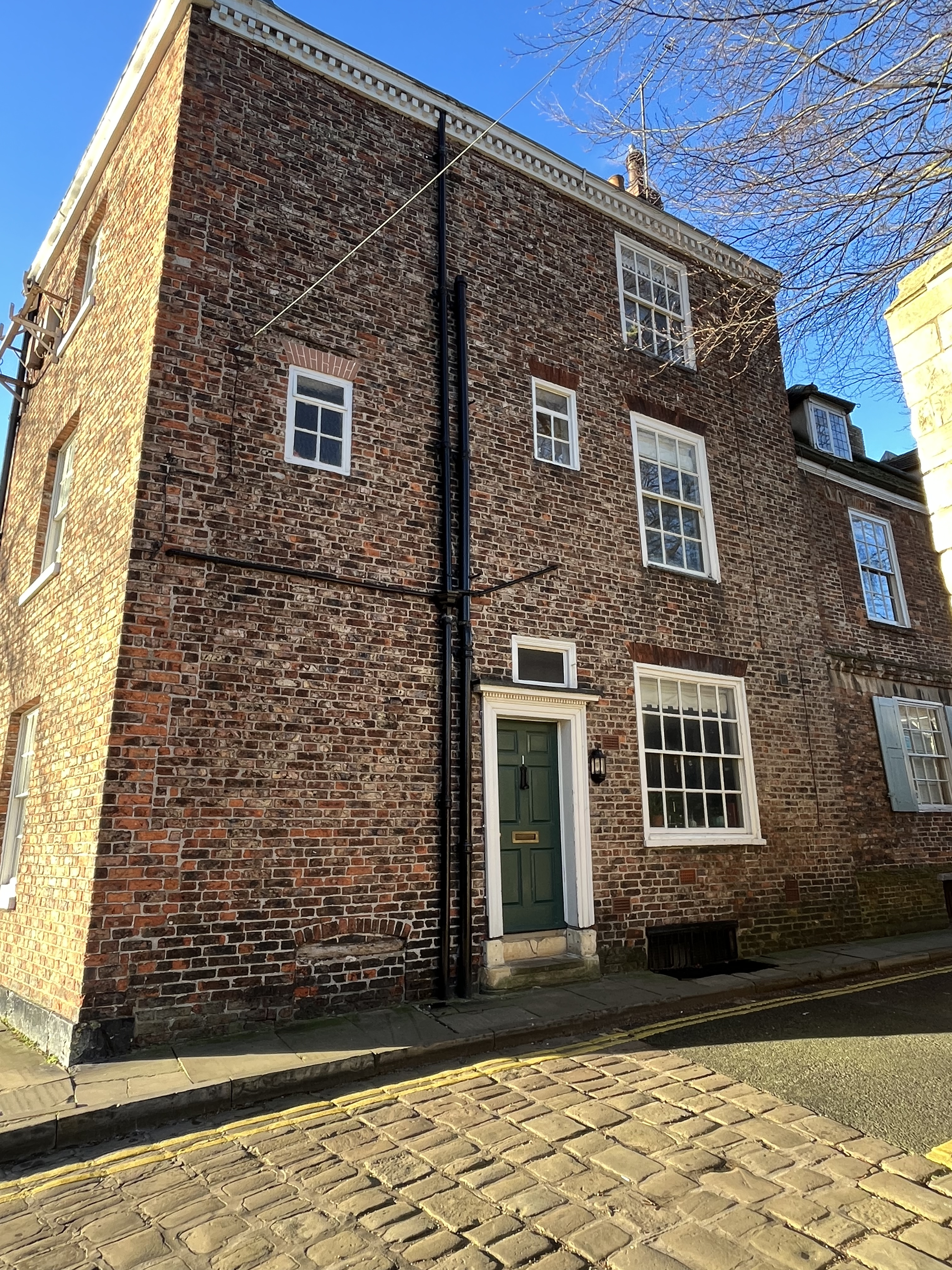
1 Precentor's Court in 2023

== See also ==
- Listed buildings in York (within the city walls, northern part)
