= Crosland Moor Airfield =

Private airfield in West Yorkshire, England

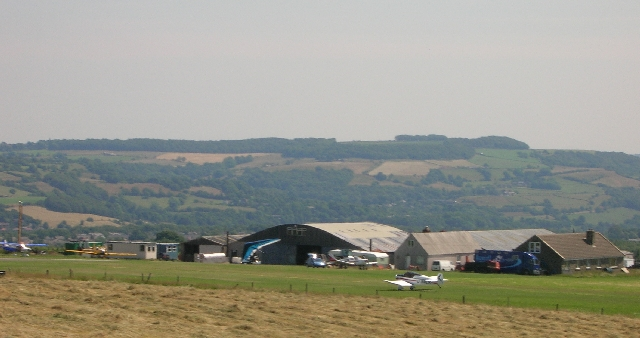
- IATA: none; ICAO: none

Summary
- Airport type: Private
- Owner: Huddersfield International Airport
- Operator: Huddersfield Aviation Ltd.
- Serves: Huddersfield
- Location: Crosland Moor, West Yorkshire, England
- Elevation AMSL: 825 ft / 251 m
- Coordinates: 53°37′16″N 001°49′54″W
- Website: www.croslandmoor-airfield.co.uk

Map
- Location in West Yorkshire

Runways
Direction	Length		Surface
Direction	m	ft	Surface
07/25	750	2,461	Asphalt
- Source: Crosland Moor Airfield

Crosland Moor Airfield is a small privately owned airfield located 1.5 NM (2.8 km; 1.7 mi) south-west of Huddersfield in West Yorkshire, England. The airfield was established by Sir David Brown who owned a local business and flew a de Havilland Dove, registration G-ARDH. It is now run by former professional motorcycle road racer James Whitham.

== Technical information ==
- Runway 07/25 is 750 m (2,461 ft) long, and is part asphalt, part grass. There is a 2.6% slope down runway 07 from the start of the asphalt.
- Elevation: 825 ft (251 m)
- Radio frequency: Huddersfield Radio 128.375 MHz

== Incidents ==
- 6 December 2008 – Piper Cherokee G-BPYO aborted take-off after failing to reach required airspeed due to the pilot inadvertently leaving the carburettor heat on, and overran the runway. One person suffered minor injuries and the aircraft was significantly damaged.
- 1 September 1996 – a WAR Hawker Sea Fury replica, G-BLTG, crashed 250 m (820 ft) south of the runway 07 threshold shortly after take-off killing the 69-year-old pilot, the only person on board.
- May 1988 – a Microlight crashed after misjudging landing when there was a sudden change of wind direction. It landed in a field near the runway, killing the pilot.

== Media appearances ==
The airfield appeared in the Amazon Prime video show The Grand Tour in series 2, episode 9, when a jet engine was tested as part of a successful attempt to break the UK speed record for amphibious vehicles.

== Gallery ==
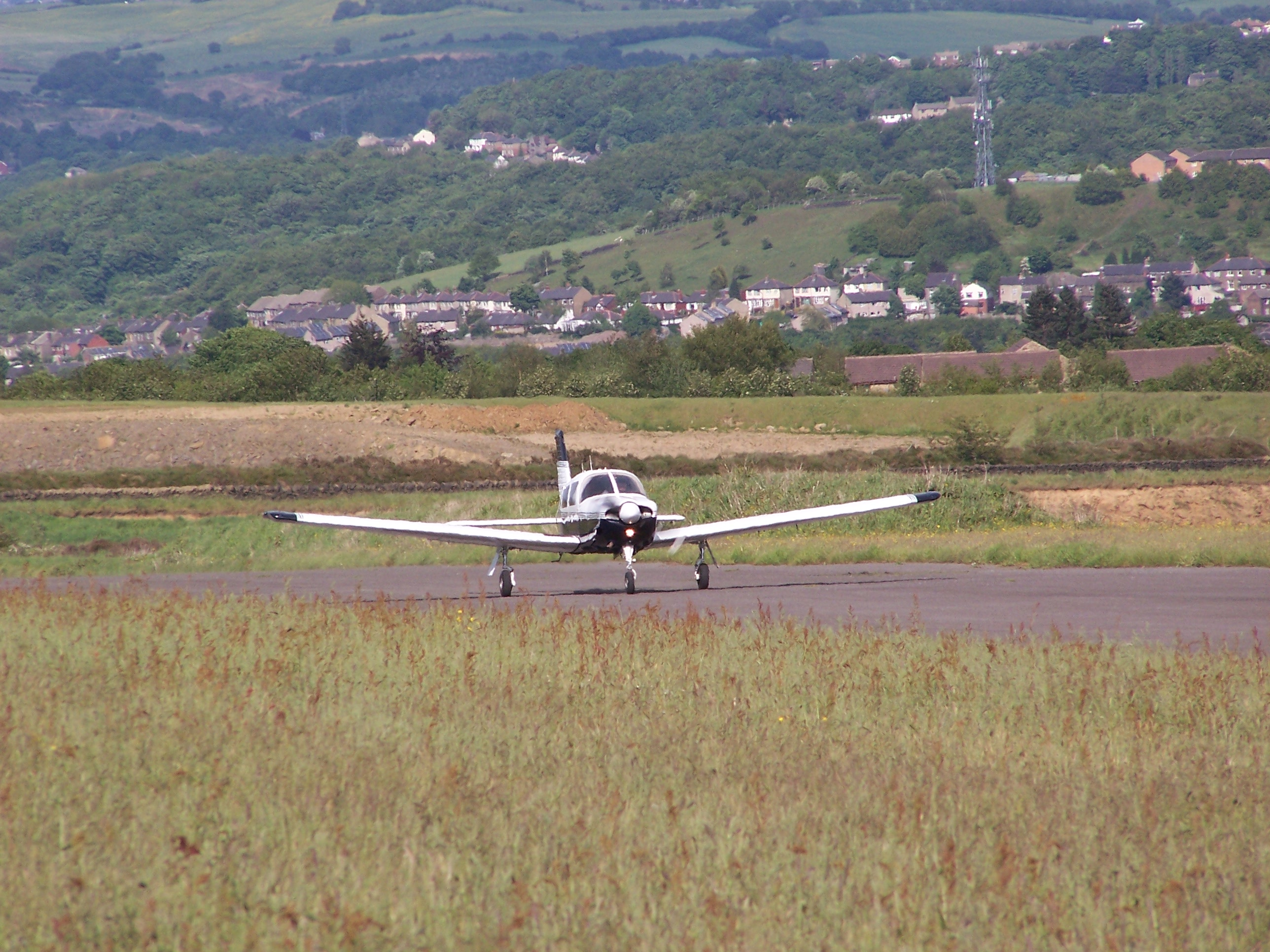
PA-28R (G-IRKB) departing from runway 25
