= John Middleton (architect) =

English architect

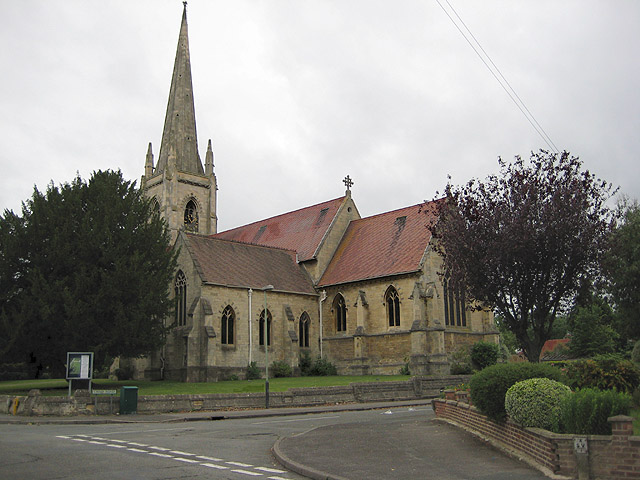
St Mark's Church, Cheltenham designed by John Middleton

John Middleton (1820–1885) was an English architect of the 19th century. He was born in York, in August 1820.

== Career ==
Though only 24, in August 1844 Middleton gained his first contract and was asked to design Cleveland Lodge, an impressive mansion situated directly beneath Roseberry Topping. He was then employed as a retained architect for the Stockton and Darlington Railway (S&DR), and built stations and railway buildings for a number of lines, including the Wear and Derwent Railway (1845), the Middlesbrough and Redcar Railway (1846) and finally the recently re-opened Weardale Railway (1847).

He moved to Cheltenham in 1859 where he designed five Anglican churches, which were All Saints', Holy Apostles, St. Mark's, St. Philip & St. James and St. Stephen's Churches. This move to Cheltenham brought Middleton to the attention of a number of landed gentry in Wales. It was Middleton who designed the Cilgwyn Mansion in Newcastle Emlyn for the Fitzwilliam family in 1884 and it was at Cilgwyn that he died in 1885. It is said locally that his death occurred at the mansion whilst disputing some aspect of the building work on the mansion. It was also Middleton's company that was contracted to build the Canterbury building at the University of Wales, Lampeter, though this was opened in 1887, and as such it is unlikely that Middleton had a great deal direct input on this building, since he died in Wales in 1885.

== Personal life ==
Middleton married Maria Margaret Pritchett, daughter of James Pigott Pritchett, architect of York, and his first wife Peggy Maria Terry. Their only surviving child John Henry Middleton (1846–1896) was appointed director of the Victoria and Albert Museum in 1893.

== Works ==
- Central Hall, Darlington 1846
- St John's Church, Darlington 1847-50
- Middlesbrough railway station 1847
- St. Mark's Church, Cheltenham 1860-66
- All Saints' Church, Cheltenham 1865-68
- Holy Apostles Church, Cheltenham 1865-71
- Mortuary Chapel, High Street, Clearwell, Gloucestershire 1867
- Holy Apostles Old School, London Road, Cheltenham 1872-73
- St. Stephen's Church, Cheltenham 1873-83
- St Philip and St James Church, Leckhampton 1885 (with Prothero and Phillot)
