= Brearton =

Village and civil parish in North Yorkshire, England

Coordinates: 54°02′38″N 1°30′34″W

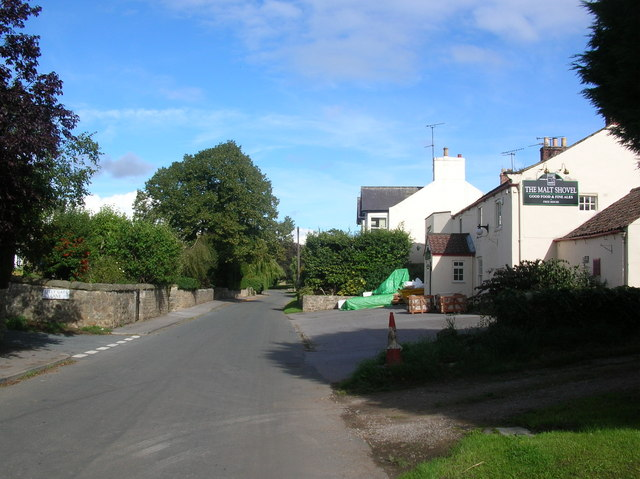
- Brearton and its village pub, the Malt Shovel

- Location within North Yorkshire
- Population: 146 (2011 census)
- OS grid reference: SE322610
- Civil parish: Brearton
- Unitary authority: North Yorkshire
- Ceremonial county: North Yorkshire
- Region: Yorkshire and the Humber
- Country: England
- Sovereign state: United Kingdom
- Post town: HARROGATE
- Postcode district: HG3
- Police: North Yorkshire
- Fire: North Yorkshire
- Ambulance: Yorkshire

Brearton is a village and civil parish in the county of North Yorkshire, England, situated about 3 miles (4.8 km) north of Knaresborough. The village is mentioned in the Domesday Book and its name derives from the Old English Brer-Tun, which means the town where the briars grew.

Until 1974 it was part of the West Riding of Yorkshire. From 1974 to 2023 it was part of the Borough of Harrogate, it is now administered by the unitary North Yorkshire Council.

According to the 2001 census it had a population of 141 increasing at the 2011 census to 146, however, in 2015, North Yorkshire County Council estimated the population to be 150. This small village has just over 40 houses that are situated quite close together. The fields surrounding the village show evidence of Medieval farming. Brearton is located at the end of the road from Nidd and Scotton; it is only accessible by vehicle from the west.

Whilst the village is popular for walkers, there are no shops, but there is one pub, The Malt Shovel, which The Guardian described as having "the best Sunday Lunches in Yorkshire."

St John's Church, Brearton was built in 1836.

== See also ==
- Listed buildings in Brearton
