= Lockwood, Huddersfield =

Suburb of Huddersfield in West Yorkshire, England

Coordinates: 53.63495°N 1.79882°W

Lockwood
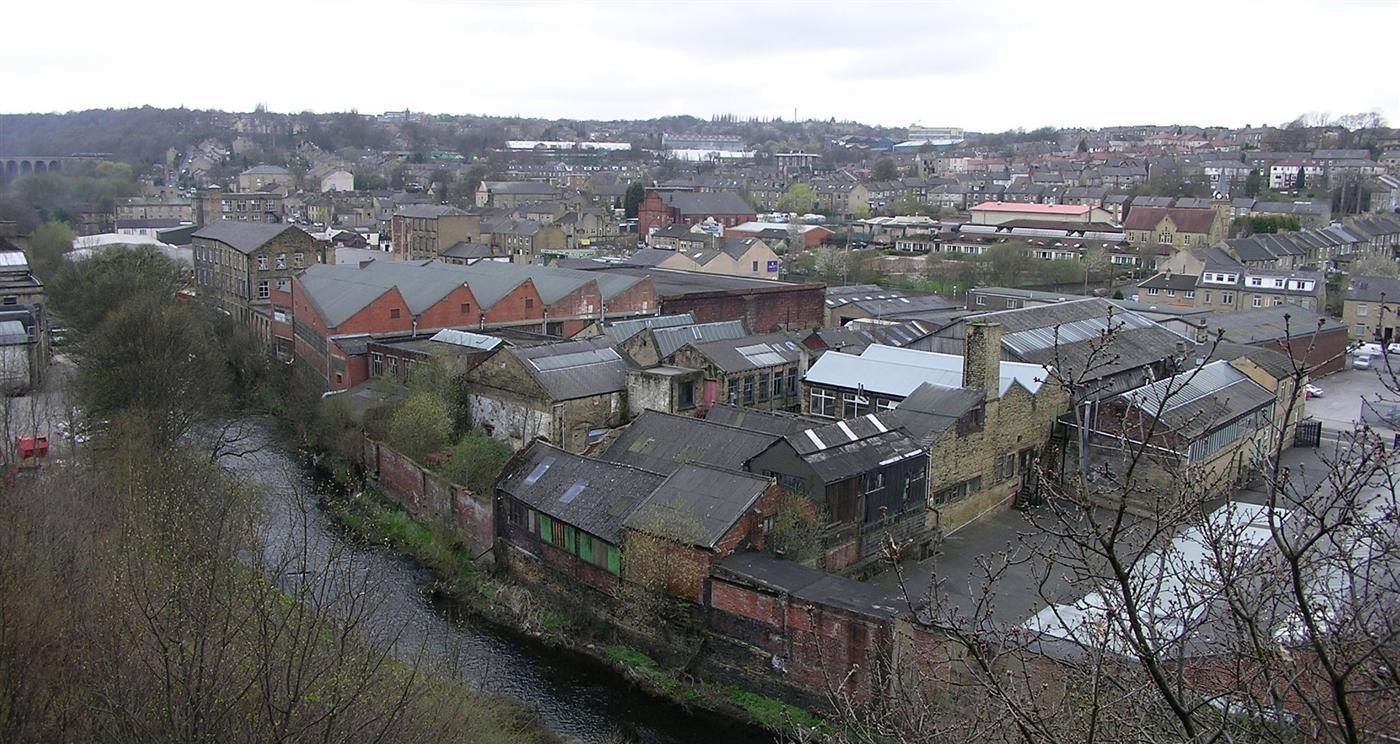
- View of Lockwood, with the viaduct top left and the River Holme below.

- Location within West Yorkshire
- OS grid reference: SE134154
- Metropolitan borough: Kirklees
- Metropolitan county: West Yorkshire
- Region: Yorkshire and the Humber
- Country: England
- Sovereign state: United Kingdom
- Post town: HUDDERSFIELD
- Postcode district: HD1
- Dialling code: 01484
- Police: West Yorkshire
- Fire: West Yorkshire
- Ambulance: Yorkshire
- UK Parliament: Huddersfield

Lockwood is an area of Huddersfield, in the Metropolitan Borough of Kirklees, West Yorkshire, England. It is 0.9 miles (1.4 km) to the southwest of Huddersfield Town Centre, to the west of the River Holme.

== History ==
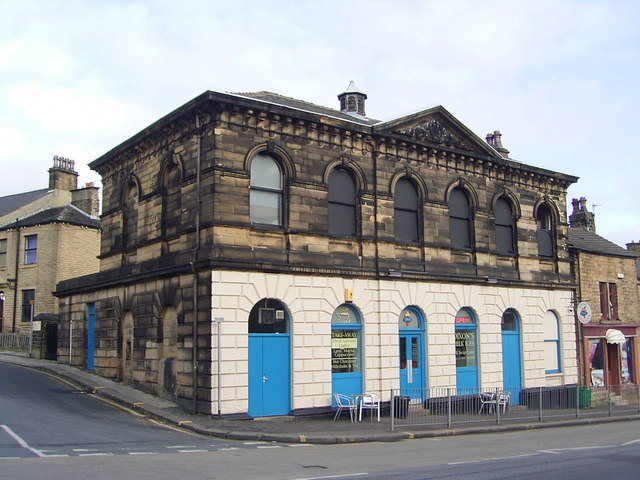
Lockwood Town Hall

Lockwood was originally called North Crosland and part of the Crosland family estate. However, it was taken over by the Lockwood family after a series of disputes between the dynasties. Parts of the area are still known as North Crosland.

Lockwood railway station is on the Penistone Line between Huddersfield and Sheffield. It is situated in Swan Lane, just before the Grade II-listed, 32-arched Lockwood Viaduct, which spans the valley and connects the line to Berry Brow. Prior to the mid-1970s it had its own extensive goods yard, coal yard, sidings and station master's house.

The goods yards were used to service and supply raw materials to the former engineering works of David Brown Ltd. This particular division of David Brown's produced gearboxes for industrial machinery and hydraulic drives and some military armoured vehicles.

A branch line from the station, just before the railway viaduct, went via Armitage Bridge and Netherton to Meltham. This passed Meltham Mills, where David Brown Ltd. had a tractor manufacturing facility. The former station master's house is now a private residence and the goods yards are part of a timber merchant's.

Lockwood is the manufacturing base of locally renowned Dixon's Milk Ices, housed in the former Lockwood Town Hall.

The Huddersfield Rugby Union Football Club, at Lockwood Park, is situated below and to both sides of the railway viaduct, in the former 'Bentley & Shaws' Brewery.

== Lockwood Brewery ==
Timothy Bentley, founder of 'Bentley & Shaws' Lockwood Brewery, is recognised as the inventor of the Stone Square system of brewing beer. This method allowed high levels of carbon dioxide to remain in the beer during fermentation, helping to give it a unique flavour and smoothness when served. The stone used in the brewery came from stone quarries in Elland.

The brewery was taken over by Bass Charrington before it closed down in the late 1960s.

== See also ==
- Listed buildings in Crosland Moor and Netherton
- Listed buildings in Huddersfield (Newsome Ward - outer areas)
