= James Pigott Pritchett =

English architect

- Born: 14 October 1789
- Died: 23 May 1868 (aged 78); York, England
- Occupation: Architect

James Pigott Pritchett (14 October 1789 – 23 May 1868) was an English architect. He lived in London and York and his practice stretched from Lincolnshire to the Scottish borders.

== Personal life ==
Pritchett was born on 14 October 1789 to Charles Pigott Pritchett and Anne née Rogers, and christened 4 January 1790 at St Petrox, Pembrokeshire.

He lived for a time in London, and around 1813 moved to York, where he is recorded as a Congregationalist deacon, and, together with William Ellerby, wrote A History of the Nonconformist Churches of York.

He married Peggy Maria Terry on 22 December 1813 at Beckenham, Kent. They had three sons and a daughter. The eldest son, Richard, became a Congregationalist minister; the second, Charles Pigott Pritchett (1818–1891) was an architect; and in 1844 his daughter, Maria Margaret, married John Middleton (1820–1885), whose only child was the archaeologist and art historian John Henry Middleton (1846–1896), later a director of the Victoria and Albert Museum.

Pritchett's second marriage was to Caroline Benson on 6 January 1829 at Belton, Lincolnshire. They had three sons and two daughters. His eldest son, James Pigott Pritchett Jr (1830–1910), was trained by him as an architect and later set up a practice in Darlington in 1854. Another son, John Benson Pritchett, became a surgeon,

Pritchett died in York on 23 May 1868, aged 78, and was buried in York Cemetery, whose buildings he had designed, on 27 May 1868.

His nephew, George (1824–1912) was also an architect, who was active mainly in Hertfordshire and Essex.

As of January 2021 a project to celebrate the work of James Pigott Pritchett was begun with a website at www.jppritchett.org.uk.

== Practice ==
Pritchett’s practice extended from Lincolnshire to the Scottish borders, with offices in York.

Known work includes:

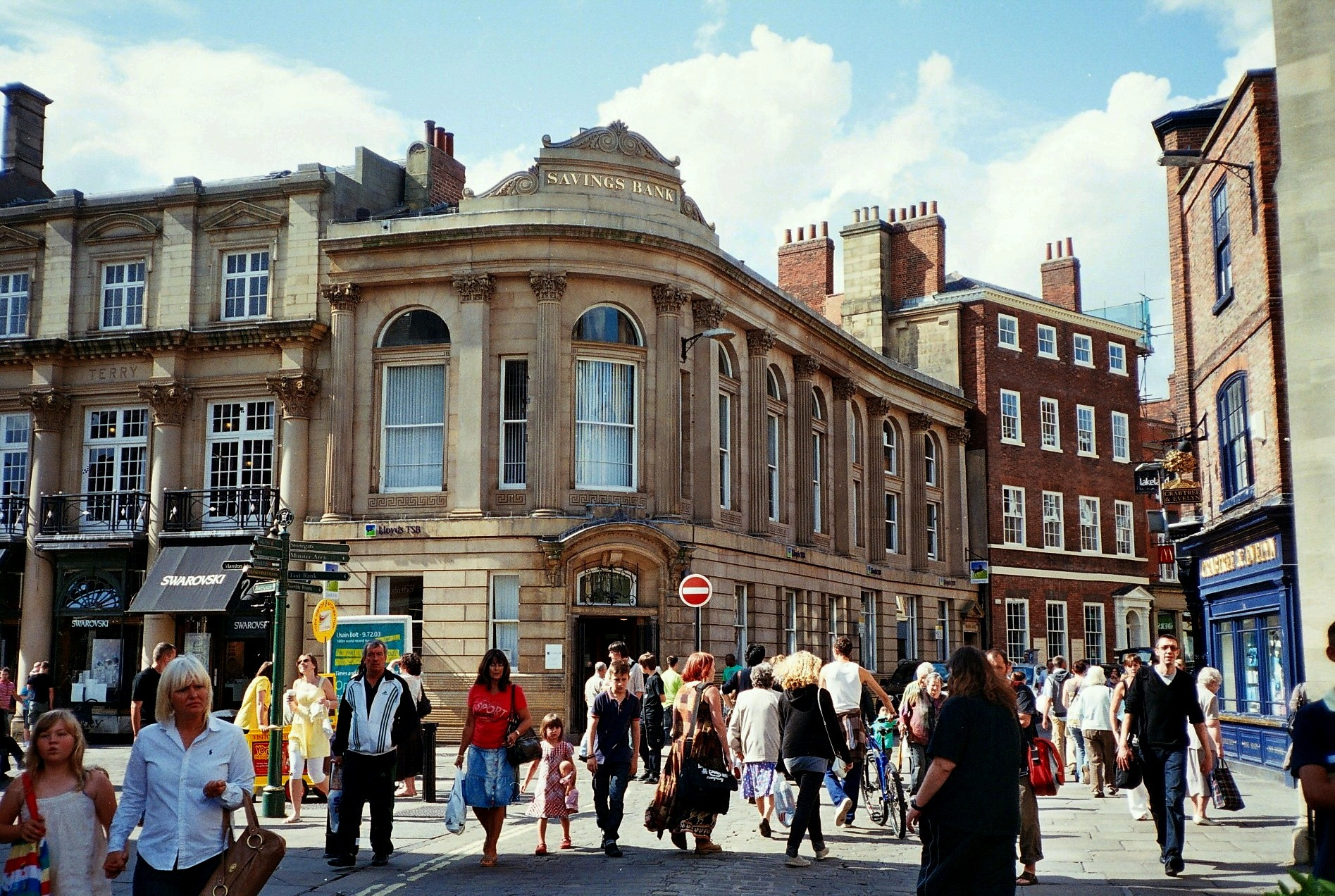
Pritchett's Savings Bank, St Helen's Square, York

- 1816 - Lendal Chapel, York
- 1825 – Saltmarshe Hall, East Riding of Yorkshire
- 1828 – Facade of the York Assembly Rooms in Blake Street
- 1829–30 – York County Savings Bank Building, St Helen's Square, York
- 1834–35 – St Peter's Church, Huddersfield
- 1836 – St John's Church Brearton
- 1836–37 – York Cemetery, York
- 1837 – Holy Trinity church Thorpe Hesley
- c.1838 – 1 Precentor's Court (including today's 24–36 High Petergate)
- 1838 – St James's Church Meltham Mills
- 1839 – St Mary's Church Rawmarsh
- 1840 – Lady Hewley's Almshouses, St Saviourgate, York
- 1840 – Salem Chapel and schoolroom, Burley in Wharfedale
- c.1840 – Gate Helmsley Lunatic Asylum ("Extensions and improvements" for James Martin)
- 1847–48 – Huddersfield railway station
- 1851 – Ebenezer Chapel, York (Primitive Methodist)
- 1854-55 - Odd Fellows Hall, Netherton

Other examples are said to be found in York Minster, Rawmarsh, Brotherton and Meltham Mills.
