= Netherton, Kirklees =

Village in West Yorkshire, England

Coordinates: 53.613°N 1.814°W

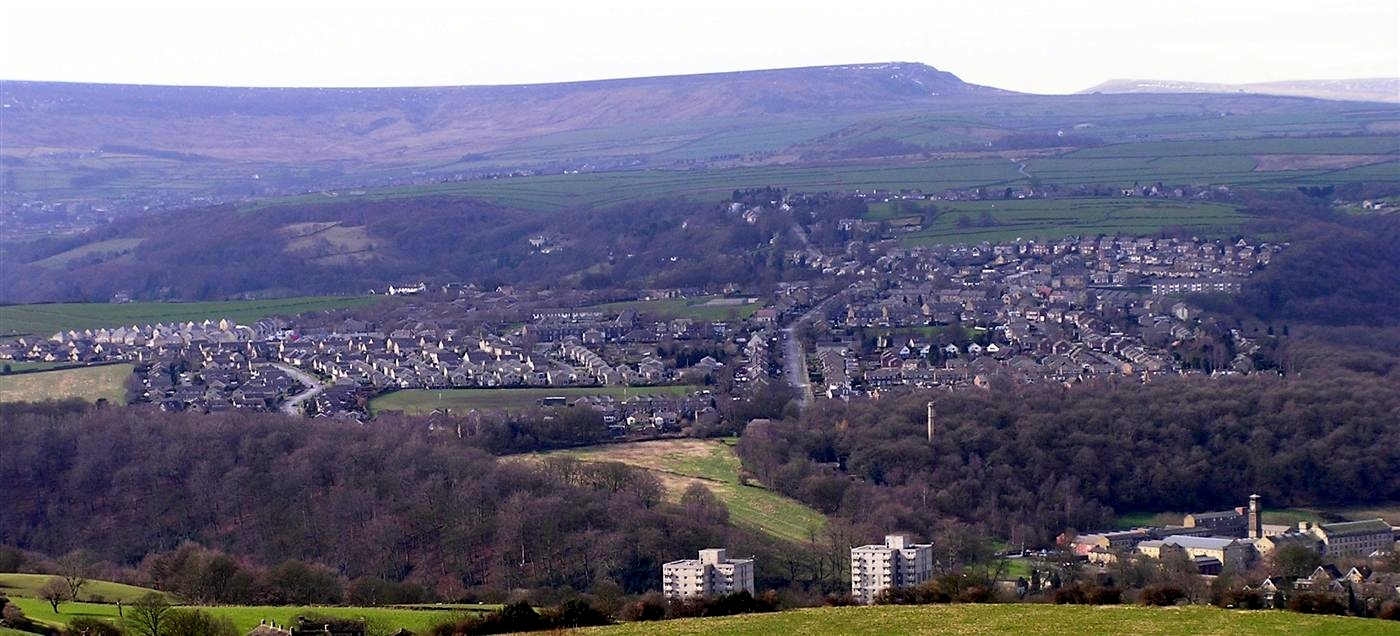
View of Netherton and South Crosland from Castle Hill, Huddersfield

Netherton is a village, near Huddersfield, in the Kirklees metropolitan borough of West Yorkshire, England. It is 2 miles (3 km) south-west of the town centre on the road to Meltham. Netherton together with South Crosland have a population of 3,702 according to the 2001 census.

It is part of the Crosland Moor and Netherton ward of the Colne Valley parliamentary constituency. It has a junior school and an infant school.

It also has a junior football club who play at South Crosland Junior school and Hawkroyd bank. They were also the founder members of the Huddersfield & District Junior football league. It also has a 3 Team open age football team in the Huddersfield District League.

== Notable people ==
- Ian Berry, artist
- Joe Skarz, professional footballer currently at Golcar United
- Sam Hirst, professional cricketer

== See also ==
- Listed buildings in Crosland Moor and Netherton
