= A640 road =

Road in England

A640

Major junctions
- West end: Rochdale; 53.6114°N 2.1637°W
- A58 A671 A664 M62 A663 A672 A6052 A643; A62
- East end: Huddersfield; 53.6470°N 1.7878°W

Location
- Country: United Kingdom

Road network
- Roads in the United Kingdom; Motorways; A and B road zones

The A640 is a road in England which runs between Rochdale in Greater Manchester and Huddersfield in West Yorkshire.

The road's most westbound point as on the edge of Rochdale town centre, at the junction of Drake Street and Manchester Road (A58). From here, the road runs eastward through:

- Newbold
- Belfield
- Firgrove
- Milnrow
- Newhey
- Ogden
- Denshaw
- Buckstones
- Deanhead
- Scammonden
- Outlane
- Huddersfield (Salendine Nook, Oakes and Marsh)

The road eastbound point is at the Trinity Street junction with the A62 at Huddersfield's town centre ring road (Castlegate).

The A640 links both Rochdale and Huddersfield with the M62 Motorway with the road meeting the Motorway's junction 21 (Milnrow for Rochdale) and junction 23 (Outlane for Huddersfield).

The road is often closed during periods of snow due to its remote nature over the Pennine hills.

The road is known as New Hey Road between Marsh, in Huddersfield and the West Yorkshire boundary. In Greater Manchester, the A640 road names include Huddersfield Road, Rochdale Road and Milnrow Road.
