= 2006 Kirklees Metropolitan Borough Council election =

Local election in England

- 4 May 2006

One third of seats (23 of 69) to Kirklees Metropolitan Borough Council 35 seats needed for a majority
	First party	Second party	Third party
Party	Conservative	Labour	Liberal Democrats
Seats won	8	7	4
Seats after	21	20	20
Seat change	▼1	▲2	▼4
Popular vote	29,200	31,076	24,445
Percentage	23.6%	25.1%	19.8%
Swing	▲0.1%	▲0.5%	▼4.0%
	Fourth party	Fifth party	Sixth party
Party	BNP	Green	Save Huddersfield NHS
Seats won	2	1	1
Seats after	3	3	1
Seat change	▲2	Steady	▲1
Popular vote	22,914	10,300	2,827
Percentage	18.5%	8.3%	2.3%
Swing	▲5.3%	▼2.7%	New
- 2006 local election results in Kirklees. Labour in red, Conservatives in blue, Liberal Democrats in yellow, BNP in dark blue, Greens in green and Save Huddersfield NHS in light red.
Majority party before election
No overall control
Majority party after election
No overall control

Elections to Kirklees Metropolitan Borough Council were held on 4 May 2006. One third of the council was up for election and the council stayed under no overall control.

== Council results ==
2006 Kirklees Metropolitan Borough Council election
Party	Candidates						Votes		
Party	Stood	Elected	Gained	Unseated	Net	% of total	%	No.	Net %
Labour	23	7	3	1	▲2	30.4	25.2	31,103	▲0.5
Conservative	23	8	1	2	▼1	34.8	23.6	29,200	▲0.1
Liberal Democrats	23	4	1	5	▼4	17.4	19.8	24,445	▼4.0
BNP	23	2	2	0	▲2	8.7	18.5	22,914	▲5.3
Green	23	1	0	0	0	4.3	8.3	10,300	▼2.7
Save Huddersfield NHS	3	1	1	0	▲1	4.3	2.3	2,827	New
Independent	4	0	0	0	0	0.0	1.6	1,917	▼0.7
English Democrat	1	0	0	0	0	0.0	0.4	436	New
New Party	1	0	0	0	0	0.0	0.3	395	New
Monster Raving Loony	1	0	0	0	0	0.0	0.1	66	▼0.1

== Council Composition ==
Prior to the election the composition of the council was:

↓
25	22	17	3	1	1
Liberal Democrats	Conservative	Labour	Gr	B	I

After the election the composition of the council was:

↓
21	21	19	3	3	1	1
Liberal Democrats	Conservative	Labour	Gr	B	I	S

Party	Previous council	New council
Liberal Democrats	25	21
Conservative	22	21
Labour	17	19
Green	3	3
BNP	1	3
Independent	1	1
Save Huddersfield NHS	0	1
Total	69	69

== Ward results ==
=== Almondbury ward ===
Almondbury
Party	Candidate	Votes	%	±%
Liberal Democrats	Linda Wilkinson	1,854	37.9	+0.9
Conservative	Martin Leonard	1,137	23.3	+1.5
BNP	Susan Auty	615	12.6	+7.0
Labour	Naheed Arshad-Mather	542	11.1	−5.9
Green	Brian Strudwick	377	7.7	−6.8
Independent	Ian Brooke	362	7.4	+3.1
Majority		717	14.7	−
Turnout		4,887	38.6	−8.4
Liberal Democrats hold		Swing		

The incumbent was Linda Wilkinson.

=== Ashbrow ward ===
Ashbrow
Party	Candidate	Votes	%	±%
Labour	Jean Calvert	1,959	43.2	−3.0
Conservative	Andrea Stephenson	1,046	23.1	+0.9
Liberal Democrats	Sandra Gordon-Overton	830	18.3	−11.5
BNP	Christine Thompson	440	9.7	+9.7
Green	Edward Adams	261	5.8	−1.9
Majority		913	20.1	−
Turnout		4,536	35.5	−9.7
Labour hold		Swing		

The incumbent was Jean Calvert.

=== Batley East ward ===
Batley East
Party	Candidate	Votes	%	±%
Labour	Mahmood Akhtar	2,779	49.6	+3.1
Liberal Democrats	Jon Bloom	1,103	19.7	−11.0
BNP	Jillian Exley	869	15.5	+10.0
Conservative	Mohamed Akram	621	11.1	−3.1
Green	Heidi Smithson	232	4.1	+0.9
Majority		1,676	29.9	−
Turnout		5,604	47.9	−11.4
Labour hold		Swing		

The incumbent was Mahmood Akhtar.

=== Batley West ward ===
Batley West
Party	Candidate	Votes	%	±%
Labour	Gwen Grailey	2,209	40.6	+5.9
BNP	Jonathan Pygott	1,169	21.5	+12.3
Liberal Democrats	David Lowe	1,125	20.7	−16.0
Conservative	Sharon Light	735	13.5	−3.3
Green	Timothy Sykes	209	3.8	+1.1
Majority		1,040	19.1	−
Turnout		5,447	44.7	−5.4
Labour gain from Liberal Democrats		Swing		

The incumbent was Geoffrey Alvy who stood down at this election.

=== Birstall and Birkenshaw ward ===
Birstall and Birkenshaw
Party	Candidate	Votes	%	±%
Conservative	Liz Smaje	1,878	37.8	−12.3
Labour	Suzy Brain-England	1,136	22.9	−1.0
BNP	John Christopher Wilkinson	1,101	22.2	+12.3
Liberal Democrats	Jean Tasker	350	7.1	−6.4
Green	Clive Richard Lord	264	5.3	+0.8
Independent	Mark Palfreeman	234	4.7	+4.7
Majority		742	15.0	−
Turnout		4,963	40.9	−7.0
Conservative hold		Swing		

The incumbent was Liz Smaje.

=== Cleckheaton ward ===
Cleckheaton
Party	Candidate	Votes	%	±%
Liberal Democrats	Ann Raistrick	1,761	33.6	−10.3
BNP	Mike Thompson	1,621	30.9	+18.9
Conservative	Harvey Mawston	1,064	20.3	−2.0
Labour	Mohammed Laher	541	10.3	−8.1
Green	Ruth Walker	253	4.8	+1.6
Majority		140	2.7	−
Turnout		5,240	43.9	−6.9
Liberal Democrats hold		Swing		

The incumbent was Ann Raistrick.

=== Colne Valley ward ===
Colne Valley
Party	Candidate	Votes	%	±%
Liberal Democrats	Nicola Turner	1,824	31.7	−8.4
Conservative	Dorothy Lindley	1,765	30.7	+5.2
BNP	Christine Hanson	910	15.8	+9.3
Labour	Helen Singleton	576	10.0	−3.8
Green	Sandra Leyland	431	7.5	−3.2
Save Huddersfield NHS	David Ellis	239	4.2	+4.2
Majority		59	1.0	−
Turnout		5,745	45.7	−4.6
Liberal Democrats gain from Conservative		Swing		

The incumbent was Dorothy Lindley.

=== Crosland Moor and Netherton ward ===
Crosland Moor and Netherton
Party	Candidate	Votes	%	±%
Save Huddersfield NHS	Jackie Grunsell	2,176	35.0	+35.0
Liberal Democrats	Shahida Awan	1,369	22.0	−19.0
Labour	Jamil Akhtar	1,296	20.8	−14.0
Conservative	Judith Roberts	576	9.3	−10.7
BNP	Skye Turner	564	9.1	+9.1
Green	Daniel Greenwood	236	3.8	−0.9
Majority		807	13.0	−
Turnout		6,217	49.4	−4.6
Save Huddersfield NHS gain from Liberal Democrats		Swing		

The incumbent was Shahida Awan

=== Dalton ward ===
Dalton
Party	Candidate	Votes	%	±%
Labour	Angela Ellam	1,447	33.6	+1.1
Liberal Democrats	Eleanor Ritchie	1,272	29.6	−0.1
Conservative	Roger Jessop	674	15.7	+0.2
BNP	Andrew Watson	639	14.9	+9.2
Green	Paul Cooney	271	6.3	−3.6
Majority		175	4.1	−
Turnout		4,303	35.0	−6.6
Labour hold		Swing		

The incumbent was Angela Ellam.

=== Denby Dale ward ===
Denby Dale
Party	Candidate	Votes	%	±%
Conservative	Jim Dodds	2,012	38.4	+3.3
Labour	Graham Turner	1,391	26.5	−8.9
Liberal Democrats	Andrew Brown	558	10.6	−0.6
English Democrat	Paul McEnhill	436	8.3	+8.3
BNP	Nicola King	434	8.3	+2.9
Green	Stephen Turnbull	414	7.9	−5.0
Majority		621	11.8	−
Turnout		5,245	43.2	−8.8
Conservative hold		Swing		

The incumbent was Jim Dodds.

=== Dewsbury East ward ===
Dewsbury East
Party	Candidate	Votes	%	±%
BNP	Colin Auty	1,902	35.6	+23.9
Labour	Eric Firth	1,612	30.2	+5.9
Liberal Democrats	Nisar Choudhary	1,010	18.9	−15.8
Conservative	Robert Haycroft	632	11.8	−2.9
Green	Peter Cunnington	182	3.4	+0.6
Majority		290	5.4	−
Turnout		5,338	43.3	−3.4
BNP gain from Labour		Swing		

The incumbent was Eric Firth.

=== Dewsbury South ward ===
Dewsbury South
Party	Candidate	Votes	%	±%
Labour	Masood Ahmed	2,322	39.6	+9.8
Conservative	Jonathan Scott	1,568	26.7	−19.2
BNP	Robert Ryan	1,457	24.8	+14.7
Liberal Democrats	Bernard Disken	293	5.0	−6.6
Green	Adrian Cruden	229	3.9	+1.2
Majority		754	12.8	−
Turnout		5,869	48.4	−9.5
Labour gain from Conservative		Swing		

The incumbent was Jonathan Scott.

=== Dewsbury West ward ===
Dewsbury West
Party	Candidate	Votes	%	±%
Labour	Mumtaz Hussain	1,966	35.1	+2.7
Liberal Democrats	Kingley Hill	1,861	33.2	−15.8
BNP	Frank Atack	1,216	21.7	+14.6
Conservative	Keith Sibbald	262	4.7	−4.4
Independent	Keith Oldroyd	173	3.1	+3.1
Green	Joan Smithson	127	2.3	−0.2
Majority		105	1.9	−
Turnout		5,605	47.6	−5.2
Labour gain from Liberal Democrats		Swing		

The incumbent was Keith Oldroyd.

=== Golcar ward ===
Golcar
Party	Candidate	Votes	%	±%
Liberal Democrats	Andrew Marchington	1,453	28.9	−10.7
BNP	Robert Walker	1,104	22.0	+22.0
Labour Co-op	Pat Colling	760	15.1	−7.6
Conservative	Jackie Firth	732	14.6	−6.3
Green	Lesley Hedges	558	11.1	−4.9
Save Huddersfield NHS	Mary Granger	412	8.2	+8.2
Majority		349	7.0	−
Turnout		5,019	38.5	−3.3
Liberal Democrats hold		Swing		

The incumbent was Andrew Marchington.

=== Greenhead ward ===
Greenhead
Party	Candidate	Votes	%	±%
Labour	Mohan Sokhal	3,343	57.0	+3.6
Liberal Democrats	Jim O'Reilly	1,089	18.6	−7.1
Conservative	Paul Murphy	608	10.4	−0.7
Green	John Phillips	433	7.4	−2.3
BNP	Stuart Exley	394	6.7	+6.7
Majority		2,254	38.4	−
Turnout		5,867	45.2	−8.3
Labour hold		Swing		

The incumbent was Mohan Sokhal.

=== Heckmondwike ward ===
Heckmondwike
Party	Candidate	Votes	%	±%
BNP	Steve Cass	2,035	36.6	+22.5
Labour	Stephen Hall	1,309	23.5	−5.1
Liberal Democrats	Abdul Qayoom	1,207	21.7	−9.0
Conservative	Amelia Bolton	820	14.7	−8.0
Green	Julian Flynn	194	3.5	−0.5
Majority		726	13.0	−
Turnout		5,565	46.2	−6.8
BNP gain from Liberal Democrats		Swing		

The incumbent was Tabasum Aslam who stood down at this election.

=== Holme Valley North ward ===
Holme Valley North
Party	Candidate	Votes	%	±%
Conservative	Royston Rogers	1,421	24.9	−1.3
Liberal Democrats	David Woodhead	1,288	22.6	−9.9
Independent	Peter Searby	1,148	20.1	−4.9
BNP	Barry Fowler	858	15.1	+15.1
Labour	Keir Tankard	547	9.6	−4.3
Green	Leslie Bailey	370	6.5	−3.9
Monster Raving Loony	Boney Maroney	66	1.2	−0.6
Majority		133	2.3	−
Turnout		5,698	45.5	−7.8
Conservative gain from Liberal Democrats		Swing		

The incumbent was Mike Bower who stood down at this election.

=== Holme Valley South ward ===
Holme Valley South
Party	Candidate	Votes	%	±%
Conservative	Nigel Patrick	2,596	46.4	−1.2
Labour	Chris Chapple	979	17.5	−4.0
Liberal Democrats	John Turner	811	14.5	−3.4
Green	Simon Anscombe	662	11.8	−1.1
BNP	Richard Brown	548	9.8	+9.8
Majority		1,617	28.9	−
Turnout		5,596	41.0	−10.0
Conservative hold		Swing		

The incumbent was Nigel Patrick.

=== Kirkburton ward ===
Kirkburton
Party	Candidate	Votes	%	±%
Conservative	Christine Smith	1,981	37.8	−0.5
Green	Derek Hardcastle	1,903	36.3	+3.5
Labour	Mike Greetham	567	10.8	−5.2
BNP	Russell Scott	457	8.7	+3.5
Liberal Democrats	Gerald Edinburgh	333	6.4	−1.4
Majority		78	1.5	−
Turnout		5,241	42.0	−6.0
Conservative hold		Swing		

The incumbent was Christine Smith.

=== Lindley ward ===
Lindley
Party	Candidate	Votes	%	±%
Conservative	Tony Brice	1,974	34.9	+5.7
Liberal Democrats	Cahal Burke	1,873	33.1	−4.4
Labour	Douglas Morgan	761	13.4	−4.5
BNP	Richard Langford	658	11.6	+11.6
Green	Richard Plunkett	398	7.0	−3.3
Majority		101	1.8	−
Turnout		5,664	42.0	−7.0
Conservative hold		Swing		

The incumbent was Tony Brice.

=== Liversedge and Gomersal ward ===
Liversedge and Gomersal
Party	Candidate	Votes	%	±%
Conservative	David Hall	1,791	35.3	−7.8
BNP	Peter Horsfield	1,643	32.4	+22.5
Labour	Ann Foxton	1,017	20.1	−10.9
Liberal Democrats	Stephen Leigh	393	7.8	−5.2
Green	Gillian Redshaw	226	4.5	+1.6
Majority		148	2.9	−
Turnout		5,070	39.7	−8.3
Conservative hold		Swing		

The incumbent was David Hall.

=== Mirfield ward ===
Mirfield
Party	Candidate	Votes	%	±%
Conservative	Vivien Lees	2,843	43.4	−9.2
BNP	Nick Cass	1,789	27.3	+16.4
Labour	Natalie Pinnock-Hamilton	904	13.8	−9.5
New Party	David Pinder	395	6.0	+6.0
Liberal Democrats	Brian Firth	368	5.6	−4.3
Green	Richard Burton	253	3.9	+0.5
Majority		1,054	16.1	−
Turnout		6,552	45.7	−6.3
Conservative hold		Swing		

The incumbent was Beverley Warby who stood down at this election.

=== Newsome ward ===
Newsome
Party	Candidate	Votes	%	±%
Green	Graham Simpson	1,817	41.9	−1.2
Labour	Mohammad Iqbal	1,140	26.3	+5.4
BNP	Simon Towers	491	11.3	+6.1
Conservative	Neil Drake	464	10.7	+0.2
Liberal Democrats	Kuldip Brar	420	9.7	−7.4
Majority		677	15.6	−
Turnout		4,332	36.4	−6.6
Green hold		Swing		

The incumbent was Sharon Fallows who stood down at this election.
