= Oakes, Huddersfield =

Area of Huddersfield, West Yorkshire, England

Coordinates: 53.653°N 1.830°W

Oakes
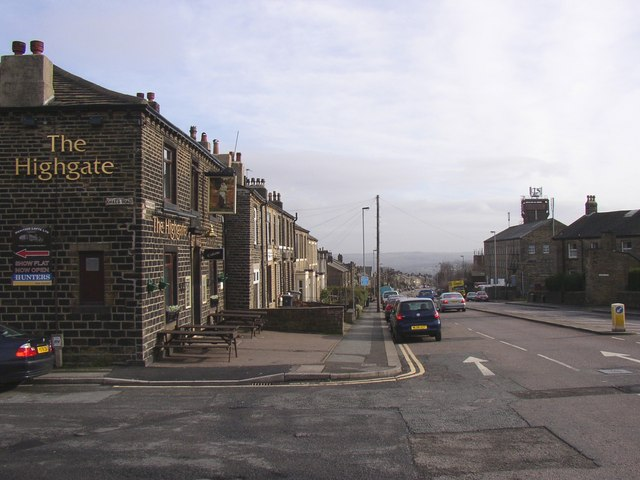
- New Hey Road, the main street of Oakes

- Location within West Yorkshire
- Metropolitan borough: Kirklees
- Metropolitan county: West Yorkshire
- Region: Yorkshire and the Humber
- Country: England
- Sovereign state: United Kingdom
- Post town: HUDDERSFIELD
- Postcode district: HD2
- Dialling code: 01484
- Police: West Yorkshire
- Fire: West Yorkshire
- Ambulance: Yorkshire
- UK Parliament: Huddersfield

Oakes is a district of Huddersfield, West Yorkshire, England. It is situated 2 miles (3 km) to the west of the town centre off the A640 New Hey Road towards the M62 motorway, between Marsh, Lindley, Quarmby and Salendine Nook.

Oakes was a location of the textile industry. Wellington Mills was constructed together with the local Baptist church, a school, and a public house in 1864. The large factories have now closed and are used for other purposes. Oakes Mills has been demolished in 2017 to make room for a supermarket.

== Climate ==
Climate data for Huddersfield/Oakes 1981–2010 (210 metres elevation)
Month	Jan	Feb	Mar	Apr	May	Jun	Jul	Aug	Sep	Oct	Nov	Dec	Year
Mean daily maximum °C (°F)	6.0 (42.8)	6.2 (43.2)	8.8 (47.8)	11.6 (52.9)	15.3 (59.5)	18.1 (64.6)	20.1 (68.2)	19.1 (66.4)	17.0 (62.6)	12.9 (55.2)	8.7 (47.7)	6.1 (43.0)	15.5 (59.9)
Mean daily minimum °C (°F)	0.8 (33.4)	0.5 (32.9)	2.3 (36.1)	3.7 (38.7)	6.1 (43.0)	8.7 (47.7)	10.9 (51.6)	10.9 (51.6)	9.1 (48.4)	6.4 (43.5)	3.3 (37.9)	1.0 (33.8)	5.3 (41.5)
Average rainfall mm (inches)	111.5 (4.39)	70.3 (2.77)	82.2 (3.24)	76.9 (3.03)	62.4 (2.46)	78.2 (3.08)	63.7 (2.51)	81.4 (3.20)	75.8 (2.98)	107.7 (4.24)	104.5 (4.11)	114.0 (4.49)	1,028.4 (40.49)
Average rainy days (≥ 1.0 mm)	15.7	13.2	13.7	10.9	10.9	11.5	10.1	11.9	11.4	14.1	15.8	15.2	154.4
Mean monthly sunshine hours	51.5	64.8	96.0	134.2	167.1	153.5	172.5	161.0	126.6	101.3	57.8	50.2	1,336.3
Source: Met Office

== See also ==
- Listed buildings in Huddersfield (Lindley Ward)
