= Percy Holmes =

English cricketer

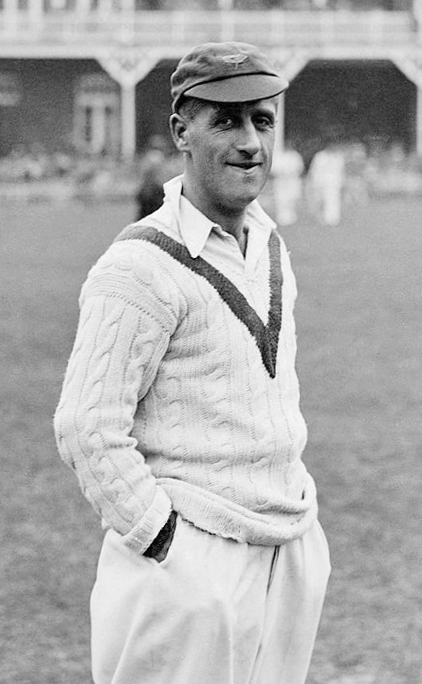

Personal information
- Full name: Percy Holmes
- Born: 25 November 1886; Oakes, Huddersfield, Yorkshire, England
- Died: 3 September 1971 (aged 84); Huddersfield, Yorkshire, England
- Batting: Right-handed
- Bowling: Right-arm medium

International information
- National side: England
- Test debut: 28 May 1921 v Australia
- Last Test: 25 June 1932 v India

Career statistics
Competition	Test	First-class
Matches	7	555
Runs scored	357	30,573
Batting average	27.46	42.11
100s/50s	0/4	67/141
Top score	88	315*
Balls bowled	–	252
Wickets	–	2
Bowling average	–	92.50
5 wickets in innings	–	0
10 wickets in match	–	0
Best bowling	–	1/5
Catches/stumpings	3/–	342/–
- Source: CricInfo, 19 November 2022

Percy Holmes (25 November 1886 – 3 September 1971) was an English first-class cricketer, who played for Yorkshire and England.

Holmes was born in Oakes, Huddersfield, Yorkshire, England. An opening batsman and a fine fielder, Holmes was a late developer who played only a handful of matches for Yorkshire before World War I, but came to immediate prominence after it with 1,886 runs and five centuries in 1919. He was named a Wisden Cricketer of the Year in 1920.

With Herbert Sutcliffe, Holmes formed for fifteen seasons the most prolific opening partnership in first-class cricket, and 69 times they put on 100 runs or more for the first wicket. Their partnership culminated, in 1932 against Essex at Leyton, in a then-world-record stand of 555, beating the previous Yorkshire (and world) record by Brown and Tunnicliffe in 1898 by just one run. Holmes contributed an unbeaten 224 to the partnership, which remained the world-record first-wicket partnership for 44 years. It is still the highest partnership for any wicket in English domestic cricket, and the fifth-highest ever for any wicket in the world.

According to Neville Cardus, Holmes was a jaunty, restless character who believed cricket should be fun. He tended to score quickly and to play shots, such as cuts and pulls, that "more correct" batsmen such as Sutcliffe rarely used.

== International career ==
Holmes' Test cricket career was limited to just seven matches, largely because Jack Hobbs was a fixture in the England team until Holmes was past forty years of age. He was picked and discarded, like many others, as England chopped and changed its eleven in 1921 in a vain attempt to match the Australian cricket team under Warwick Armstrong; in fact, Holmes was top scorer, with thirty out of 112, in the first innings of the first Test at Trent Bridge, but he scored only eight in the second innings, and the match was over inside two days. He had to wait six years before being picked again, for the 1927–28 tour to South Africa under Rony Stanyforth, where he opened with Sutcliffe in all five Tests, making 302 runs, including four scores of more than fifty and a highest of 88, but finishing with a "pair" in the last Test. His seventh and final Test came ten days after his world record stand, when, at forty-five, he was picked for the Lord's match against India in 1932. He made just 6 and 11.

== County career ==
In county cricket, Holmes was reliably prolific. He scored more than 2,000 runs in seven seasons between 1920 and 1930, and more than 1,500 runs in six other seasons. He scored 1,021 runs in the month of June in 1925 at an average of 102, a sequence that included his highest score, 315 not out, at Lord's against Middlesex, at that point the highest score ever made on the ground. In all first-class cricket, he scored 30,573 runs at an average of more than 42 per innings, with 67 centuries: he is 58th on the all-time list of run-getters.

His career with Yorkshire dissolved under a cloud, however, when the Yorkshire Committee, worried about his 46 years and increasing troubles with lumbago, resolved against renewing his contract. A brouhaha was quickly enkindled by the furious Yorkshire members, who put forward a vote of no confidence in the committee, contending that this was no way to treat so true-hearted and prolific a servant of Yorkshire cricket, but the decision stood.
