= Halifax Infirmary =

Halifax Infirmary may refer to:

- Halifax Infirmary, West Yorkshire, a hospital established 1838 in Halifax, West Yorkshire, England, a predecessor of the Royal Halifax Infirmary
- Halifax Infirmary, Nova Scotia, a hospital established 1886 in Halifax, Nova Scotia, Canada, a predecessor of the Queen Elizabeth II Health Sciences Centre
