= Marsh, Huddersfield =

Suburb of Huddersfield, West Yorkshire, England

Coordinates: 53.650°N 1.808°W

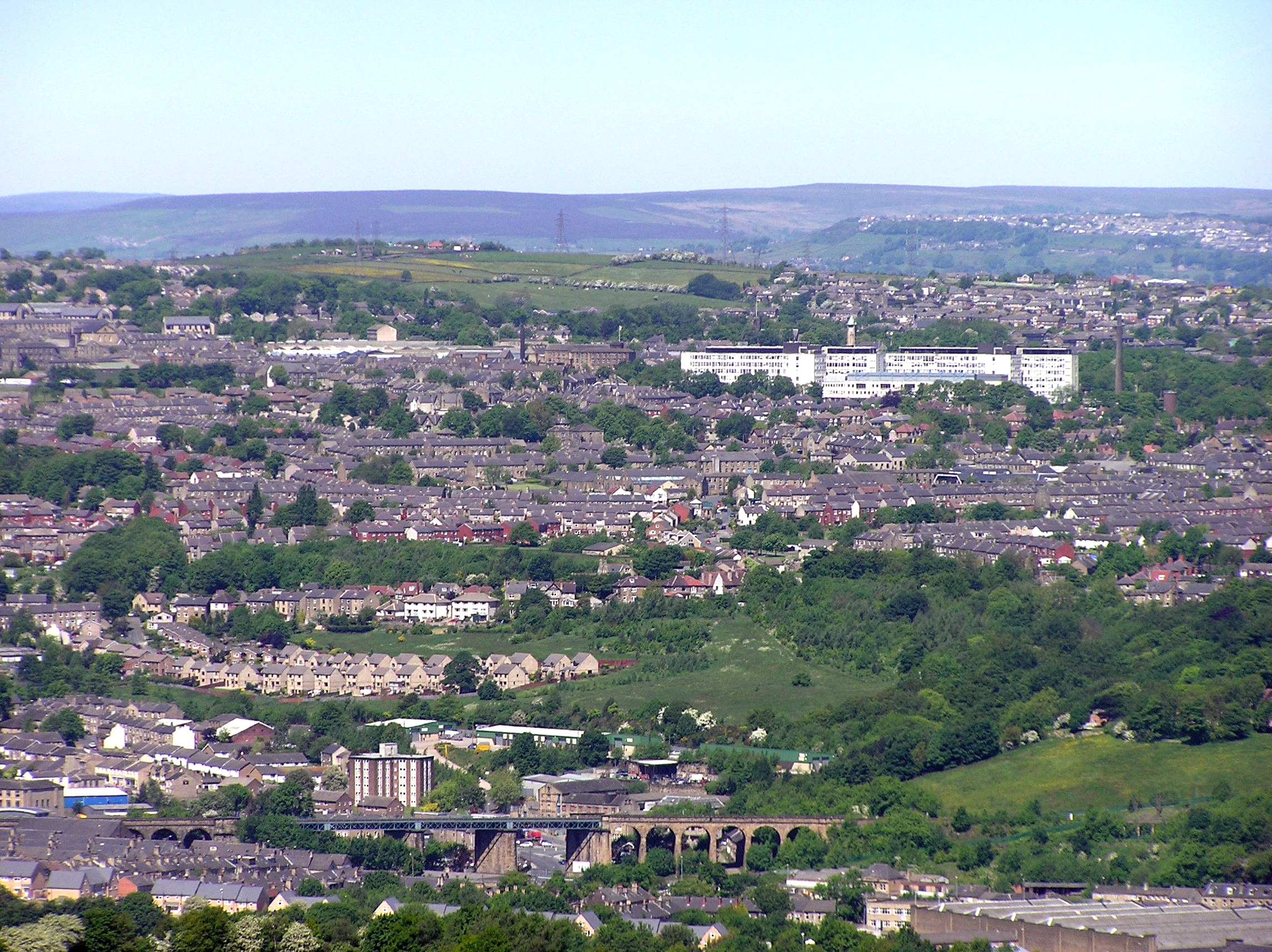
View of Marsh, Paddock and Oakes looking towards Lindley

Marsh is a suburb of Huddersfield, West Yorkshire, England that is situated 0.93 miles (1.5 km) west of the town centre.

At the 2001 census the population was recorded as 4,482. It is said that the area is so-called because it was wetland before it was reclaimed. It used to be known as Paddock-with-Marsh. The A640 road between Huddersfield town centre and Junction 23 of the M62 motorway runs through Marsh. This thoroughfare is known as Westbourne Road and is Marsh's main shopping area. One of Huddersfield's private schools, Huddersfield Grammar, is situated on Luck Lane.

The Yorkshire and England cricketer Wilfred Rhodes and his family lived in Marsh for over 40 years.

The actor James Mason originated from this area before going to Cambridge University and Hollywood.

Holy Trinity Church lies in the eastern part of the suburb, just outside Huddersfield town centre, and was built between 1816 and 1819.

== See also ==
- Listed buildings in Huddersfield (Greenhead Ward)
