= Oakes School =

Listed building in Huddersfield, England

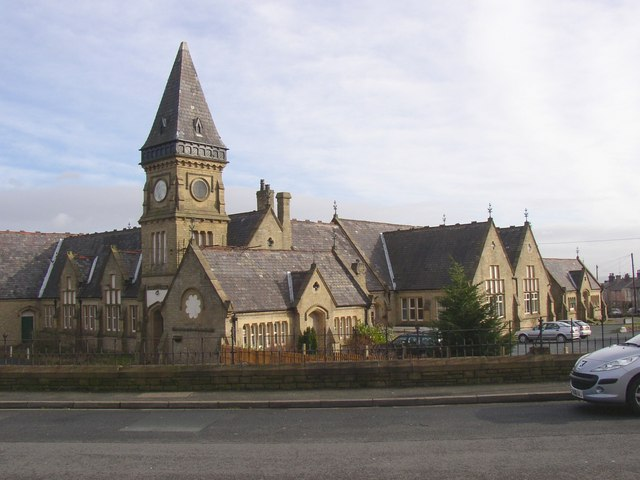
- The school in 2007

- Location within West Yorkshire
- Former names: Wellington Street School

General information
- Status: Derelict
- Type: School (former)
- Architectural style: Victorian
- Location: Oakes Road, Huddersfield, West Yorkshire, England
- Coordinates: 53.6550°N 1.8233°W
- Opened: 1873
- Renovated: 1885

Design and construction
- Architect: Charles Fowler

Renovating team
- Architect: Ben Stocks

Listed Building – Grade II
- Official name: Oakes School
- Designated: 29 September 1978
- Reference no.: 1229575

Oakes School is a Grade II listed former school on Oakes Road in the Oakes area of Huddersfield, West Yorkshire, England. Built in 1873 and extended in 1885, it later became the Wellington Court residential home before standing vacant for many years. The building was destroyed by fire in 2020 and has since been identified as one of the most endangered Victorian‑era buildings in England and Wales.

== History ==
The building was designed by Charles Fowler in 1873. The school was extended by Ben Stocks in 1885. After the school closed it became known as the Wellington Court residential home. In 2018, it was reported that the site would be redeveloped for housing. However the building remained vacant for many years. In 2020, the school was destroyed by fire. The ruins of the school have been compared to Hogwarts from the Harry Potter series. In April 2026, Oakes School was named one of the top 10 most endangered Victorian-era buildings in England and Wales by the The Victorian Society.

== Gallery ==
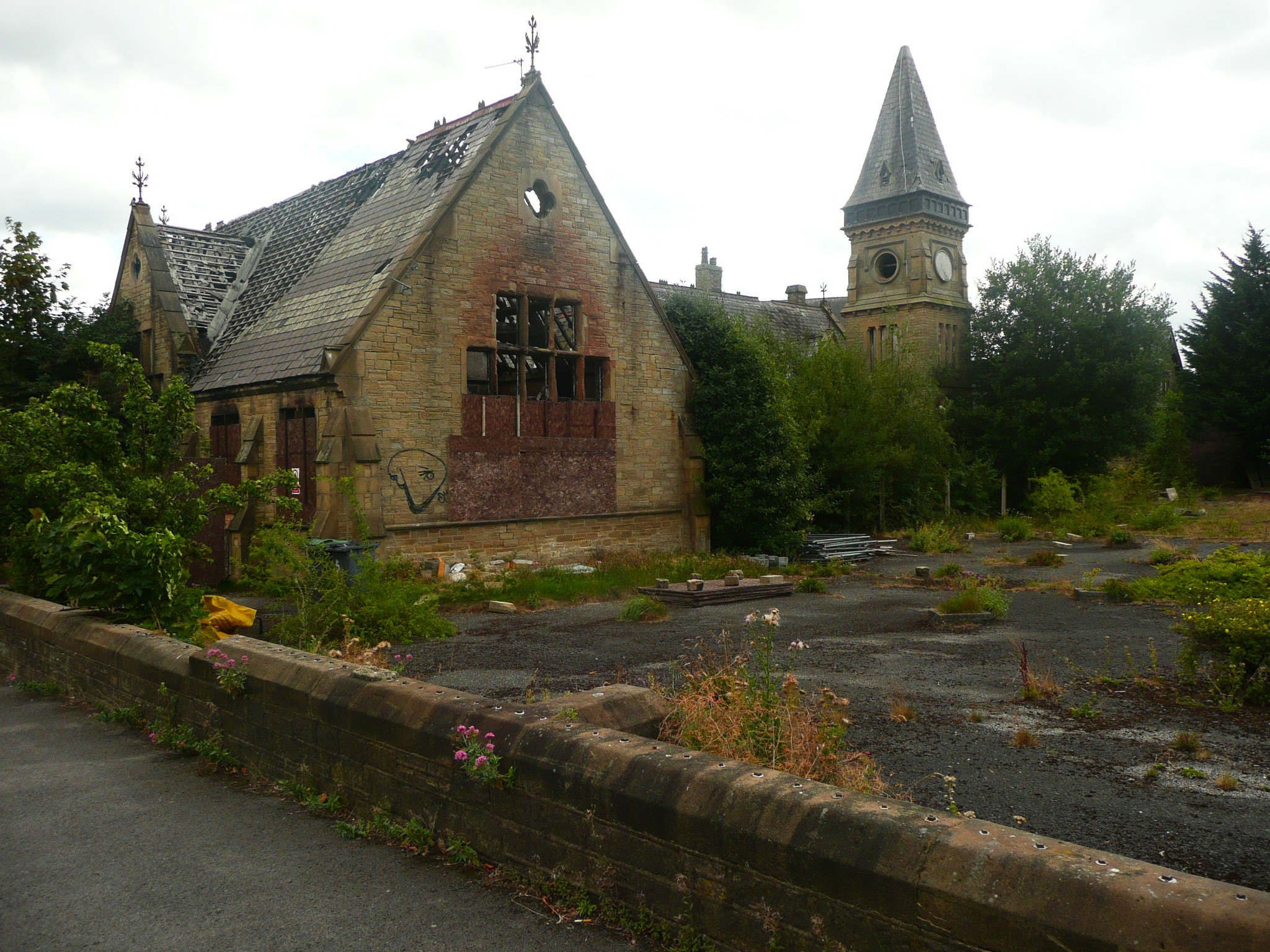
Fire damage in 2022

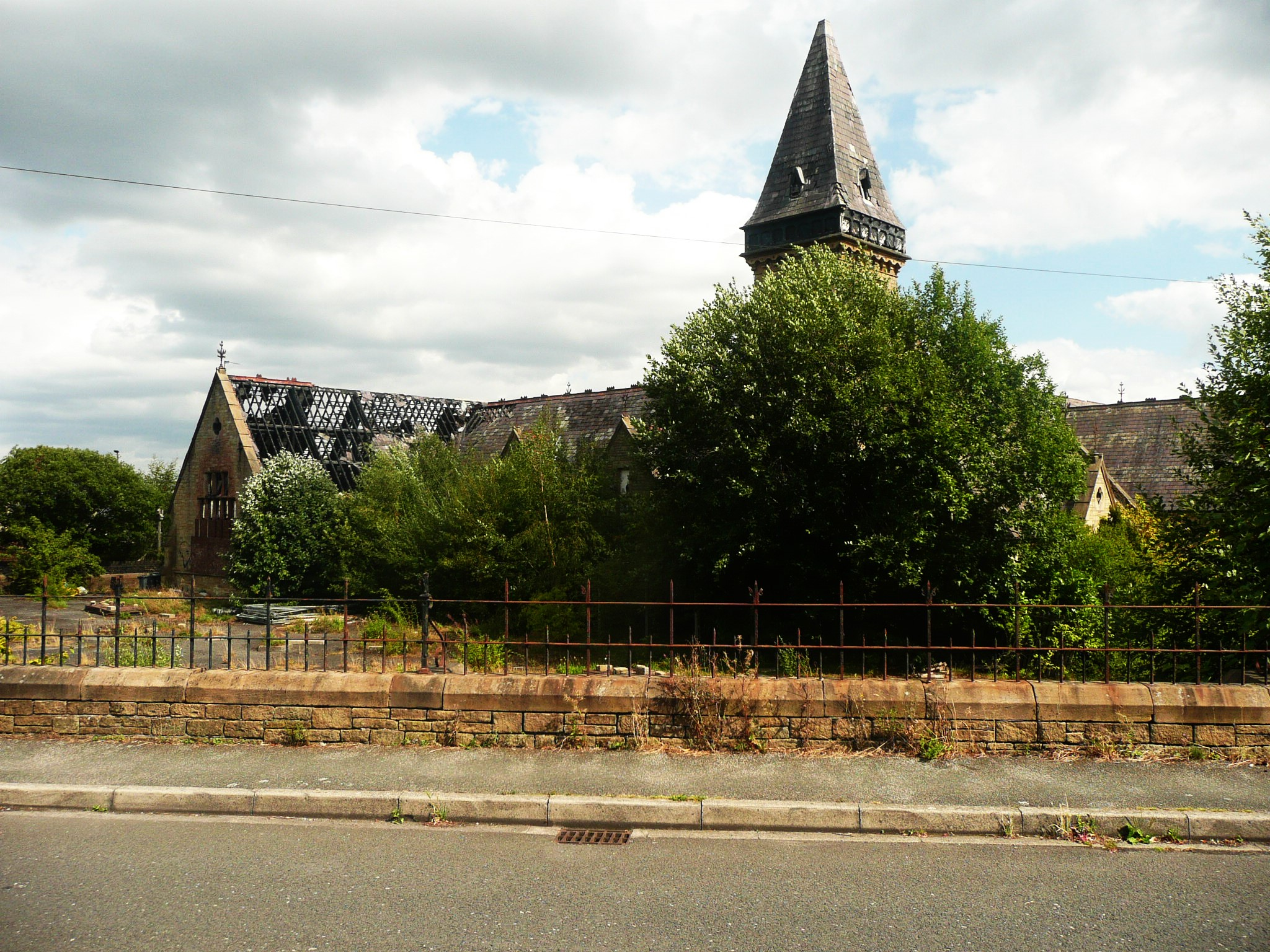
Fire damage in 2022

== See also ==
- List of schools in Kirklees
- Listed buildings in Huddersfield (Lindley Ward)
