= Huddersfield Royal Infirmary =

Coordinates: 53.655°N 1.816°W

- Calderdale and Huddersfield NHS Foundation Trust
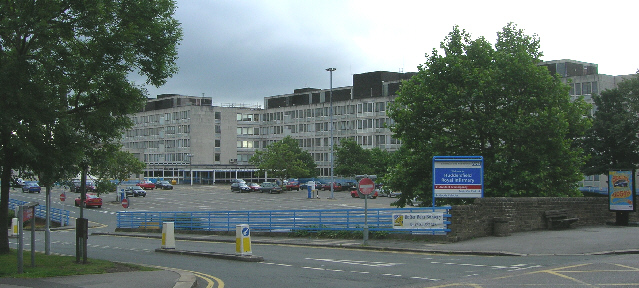
- Huddersfield Royal Infirmary, Lindley.

Geography
- Location: Huddersfield, West Yorkshire, England

Organisation
- Care system: NHS England

Services
- Emergency department: Yes - Trauma Unit
- Beds: 810

History
- Founded: 1965

Links
- Website: http://www.cht.nhs.uk/index.php?id=53
- Lists: Hospitals in England

The Huddersfield Royal Infirmary is a hospital situated in the English town of Huddersfield, part of Calderdale and Huddersfield NHS Foundation Trust. It is situated in the suburb of Lindley and provides general services, emergency services and some specialist services.

== History ==
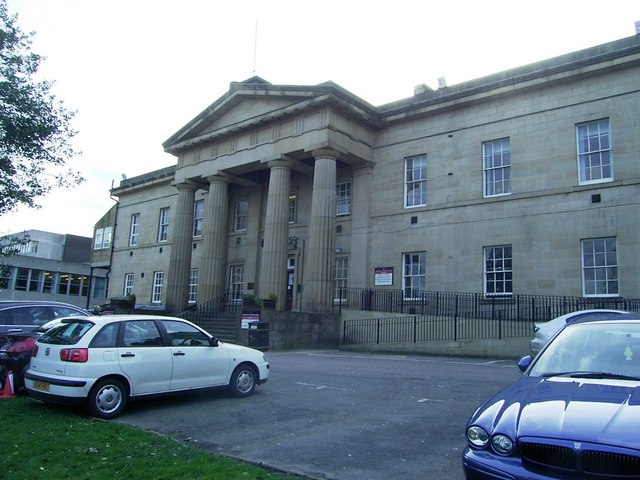
The old Infirmary in New North Road

The original hospital in Huddersfield, which was designed by Joseph Kay and which was located at New North Road, opened in 1831. Additions included the south wing in 1861, the north wing in 1874 and the Carlisle Wing, financed by a gift from Sir Hildred Carlile, in 1898. The foundation stone for a further extension was laid by the Duke of York in 1932; it was opened by Lord Moynihan in 1934.

The infirmary moved to new facilities at Lindley which were completed in 1965 and formally opened by Prime Minister Harold Wilson in January 1967. It became the base for Huddersfield Pharmacy Specials, a business which had been established several years earlier and which produces mainly unlicensed medicines and bespoke creams and ointments, oral liquids, eye drops and injectables.

In April 2006, photovoltaic array panels were installed on the roof of the hospital building, providing it with a renewable source of electricity.

In May 2024, the new Emergency Department opened. The department was designed twice the size as the previous trauma unit. Situated on the hospitals North Drive, the resuscitation room included four private cubicles, and the major injuries area was built significantly larger than previously. The new Emergency Department won the title for the Best New Build and was also the overall winner at the 2024 Huddersfield Civic Society Design Awards.

== See also ==
- List of hospitals in England
