= Charles Fowler =

English architect (1792–1867)

Charles Fowler (17 May 1792 – 26 September 1867) was an English architect, born and baptised at Cullompton, Devon. He is especially noted for his design of market buildings, including Covent Garden Market in London.

== Life ==
=== Education and early work ===
Fowler was born at Cullompton, Devon on 17 May 1792, and baptised there on 26 December 1800. He was educated at Taunton Grammar School. In 1814, after serving an apprenticeship of seven years with John Powning of Exeter, he moved to London and entered the office of David Laing, whom he assisted on the designs for the Custom House. He then set up his own practice, working from an address in Great Ormond Street, and later, from 1830, at 1, Gordon Square.

Fowler generally worked in a classical style, often freely interpreted. Thomas Leverton Donaldson described him as "gifted with a practical rather than an imaginative turn of mind.". An important early work was the Court of Bankruptcy in Basinghall Street, completed in 1821. This was a substantial brick building, raised over a granite basement and stuccoed in imitation of rusticated stonework. It had a courtyard, two sides of which had open arcades, supported on square granite columns.

In 1822 Fowler entered the competition to design the new London Bridge, and won first prize, with a proposal for five-arched bridge. However, the scheme was rejected by a committee of the House of Commons, and the commission awarded to John Rennie. Four years later he rebuilt the bridge across the River Dart at Totnes in his native Devon.

=== Markets ===
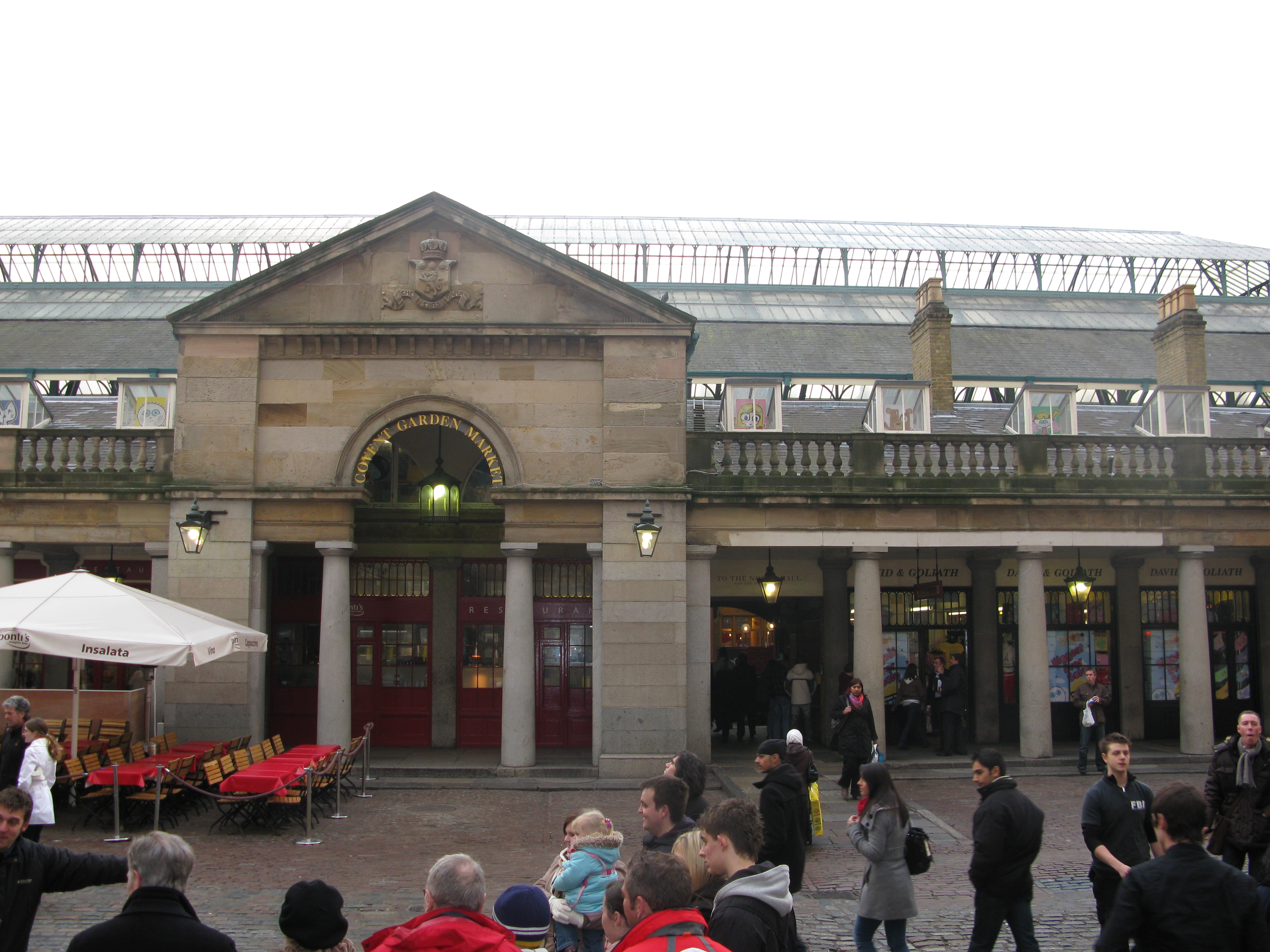
Covent Garden Market

In 1818 Fowler began work on the new market at Gravesend in Kent, with a pair of colonnades, 80 feet long, connected by a covered building at one end.

In around 1826, the Duke of Bedford commissioned him to construct buildings to house the market in the Piazza at Covent Garden, which until then had been accommodated in sheds and hovels. There, as in many other of his buildings, he used Haytor granite mined in Dartmoor, partly for its strength and partly out of a desire to encourage an industry in his native Devon. Just across the Strand, on a site sloping down towards the Thames, he later built Hungerford Market. His involvement with this project predated his designs for Covent Garden, as he had been asked to survey the site as early as 1824, but the act allowing the work and incorporating the company was not enacted until May 1830. Fowler's building was finally opened in 1833. Donaldson praised the way in which Fowler exploited the complex, multi-level site, describing the "playful picturesqueness of the group, where court rose above court, galleries above galleries, and where the series of roofs outtopped each other." In this building, Fowler demonstrated his preference for lightweight construction. He later added an iron roof over the main courtyard. Later in the 19th century the building was demolished to make way for Charing Cross Station.

He later designed the Corn Market at Tavistock (1835) for the Duke of Bedford and the Lower Market at Exeter, where he also supervised the construction of the Higher Market, following the death of its architect.

=== Conservatory at Syon House ===
In 1827 he designed and built a Conservatory at Syon House for the Duke of Northumberland. This ambitious building, which still exists, is composed of several glasshouses of varying width and height, with a total frontage of 230 feet (70 m); the central tropical house is in the form of a Greek cross, with a glass dome 38 feet (12 m) wide.

=== Churches ===
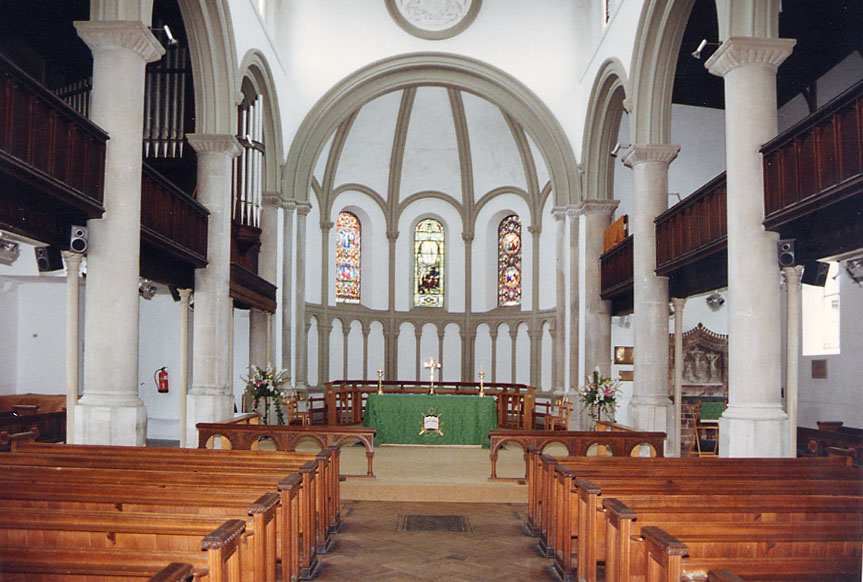
Interior of St Paul, Honiton

At Honiton, Devon, Fowler built the church of St Paul (1837–8) in what Nikolaus Pevsner described as "the Norman style, or at least with plenty of Norman motifs". Fowler's roof there was of an experimental design, incorporating cast-iron ribs supporting a cement and tile covering; this, however, had to be replaced due to the excessive amount of condensation it collected. His other ecclesiastical work included a chapel at Kilburn and several churches in the Gothic style, including:

- Church at Teffont Evias, Wiltshire, later dedicated to St Michael (rebuilding and enlargement, 1824–26)
- St John the Evangelist, Hyde Park, London (1829–32)
- St Andrew's church at Charmouth, Dorset (1836)
- St Mary's church, Bickleigh, Devon (rebuilding and enlargement, 1839)

=== Hospitals ===
In around 1842, after winning a competition, Fowler built the Devon County Lunatic Asylum, designed on a radial plan of the panopticon type pioneered at Millbank Prison. He was also responsible for the London Fever Hospital in Liverpool Road, Islington, a commission he received due to the influence of the Earl of Devon. The circumstances caused some controversy as a competition had already had been held to choose a design, and one by David Mocatta had been formally decided upon by the committee. This however, was set aside and Fowler brought in to carry out the work.

=== Other works ===
He entered many architectural competitions, coming third in the contest for the Nelson monument in Trafalgar Square with a proposal submitted jointly with the sculptor R.W. Sievier. He was architect and surveyor to the Amicable Society, and to the West of England Fire and Life Insurance Office. He was employed by Sir Ralph Lopes, the Bishop of Exeter, and the Courtenay family for whom he executed considerable alterations and additions to Powderham Castle. He was the architect of Oakes School in Huddersfield.

One of his last buildings, constructed in 1852 was the hall of the Wax Chandlers' Company, of which he was a member, and eventually its Master.

=== Institute of British Architects ===
Fowler was a founder-member of the Institute of British Architects, and served as its honorary treasury and later vice-president.

=== Exhibited work ===
He exhibited at the Royal Academy between 1825 and 1847.

=== Later life ===
He retired from architecture in 1853, and died at Great Marlow, Bucks, on 26 September 1867.

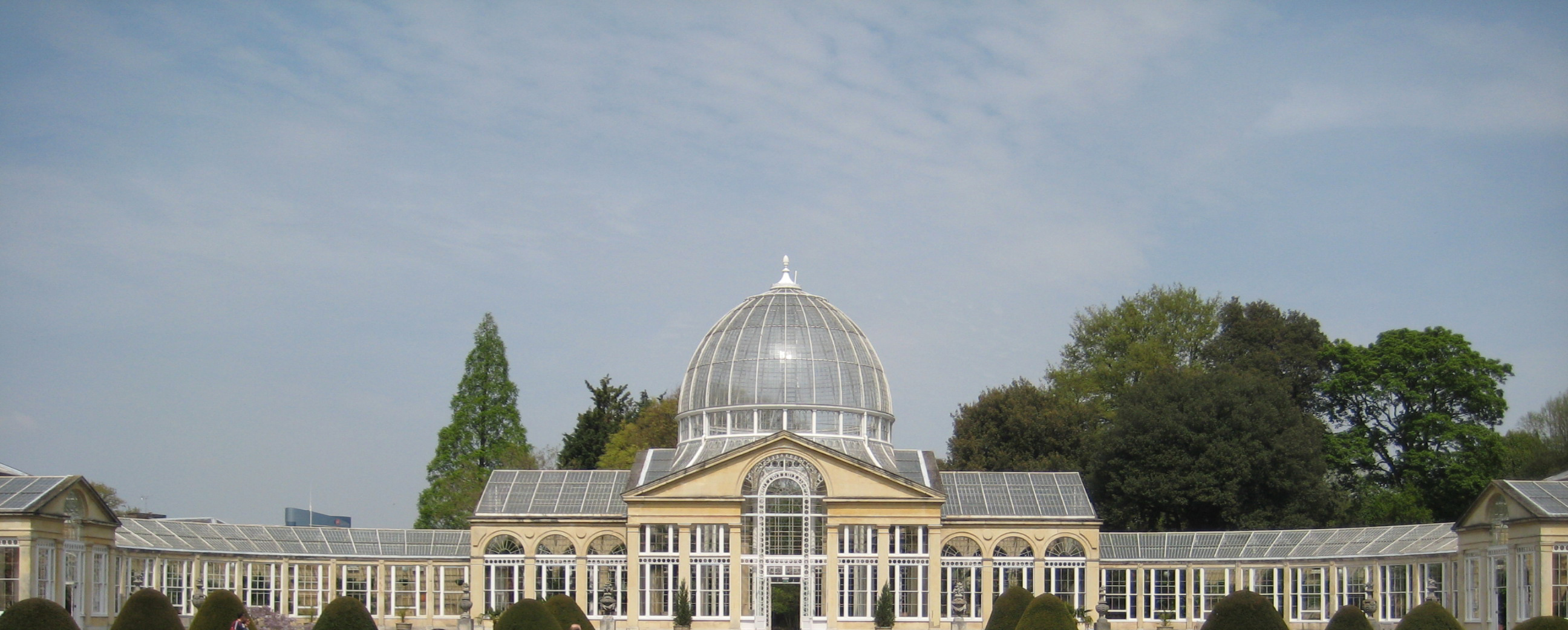
The conservatory, Syon House

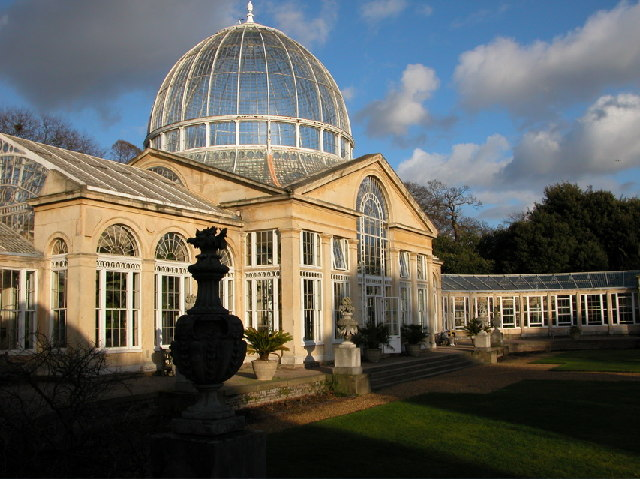
The conservatory, Syon House

== Notes and references ==
- Jeremy Taylor, "Charles Fowler (1792–1867): A Centenary Memoir", Architectural History, 11 (1968), pp. 57–74+108-112 doi:10.2307/1568322
- Chisholm, Hugh, ed. (1911). "Fowler, Charles" . Encyclopædia Britannica. Vol. 10 (11th ed.). Cambridge University Press. p. 760.
