= Royal Halifax Infirmary =

- Calderdale and Huddersfield NHS Foundation Trust
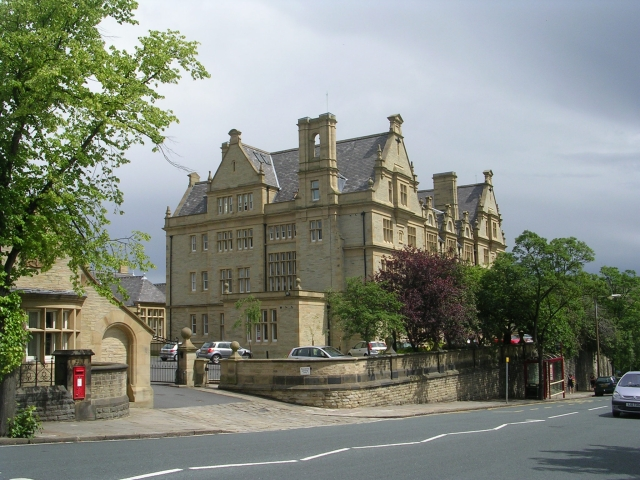
- Part of the Infirmary in 2009 after conversion to residential use

- Shown in West Yorkshire

Geography
- Location: Halifax, West Yorkshire, England, United Kingdom
- Coordinates: 53.71315°N 1.86613°W

Organisation
- Care system: Public NHS

History
- Founded: 1807
- Closed: 2001

Links
- Lists: Hospitals in England

The Royal Halifax Infirmary was a hospital in Halifax, West Yorkshire, England, which opened in 1896 and closed in 2001.

== History ==
=== Earlier hospitals ===
The predecessors of the Royal Halifax Hospital were the Halifax Dispensary (1807-c.1836) in Hatters Close, and the Halifax Infirmary or Halifax Infirmary and Dispensary in Blackwall, opposite Holy Trinity Church, from 1838. George Townsend Andrews, best known as a railway architect, designed the 1838 premises, which were demolished after 1896. The West Yorkshire Archive Service holds the records of both of these institutions in addition to those of the infirmary.

=== From 1896 ===
The infirmary's building in Free School Lane, Halifax, was opened on 28 April 1896 by the Duke and Duchess of York (the future George V and Queen Mary), who also opened the town's Borough Market that day. It is said that Queen Victoria had given permission for it to be named the "Halifax Royal Infirmary" but that the duke announced the wrong name, which was then retained.

It became part of the National Health Service in 1948, and was part of the Calderdale Healthcare NHS Trust, which in 2001 merged into the Calderdale and Huddersfield NHS Foundation Trust. The hospital was closed in 2001 on the opening of the new Calderdale Royal Hospital.

After closure some of the buildings were converted to residential use and known as "The Royal". Eleven blocks of the buildings, and a lodge and elements of the boundary walls, are Grade II listed buildings.

== Notable people ==
- Euphemia Steele Innes, RRC, DN (1874–1955), Scottish nurse. From 1906 to 1907 she was assistant matron at the Royal Halifax Infirmary; from 1912 to 1913 she was matron there.
