= Listed buildings in Huddersfield (Lindley Ward) =

Lindley is a ward of Huddersfield in the metropolitan borough of Kirklees, West Yorkshire, England. It contains 122 listed buildings that are recorded in the National Heritage List for England. Of these, one is listed at Grade I, the highest of the three grades, four are at Grade II*, the middle grade, and the others are at Grade II, the lowest grade. The ward is to the northwest of the centre of Huddersfield, and includes the districts of Birchencliffe, Lindley, Oakes, Quarmby, and Salendine Nook.

Most of the ward is residential, with some of the northern part being rural. In the rural part most of the listed buildings are farmhouses and farm buildings, and in the residential part they are houses and associated structures. The other listed buildings include mill buildings, two guide stones, a boundary stone, a commemorative cross, a public house, churches, chapels and associated structures, and a clock tower. The clock tower was designed by Edgar Wood, who had family connections with the area, and a number of the listed buildings in the 1890s and 1900s were designed by him.

== Key ==
Grade	Criteria
I	Buildings of exceptional interest, sometimes considered to be internationally important
II*	Particularly important buildings of more than special interest
II	Buildings of national importance and special interest

== Buildings ==
Name and location	Photograph	Date	Notes	Grade
Haigh Cross; 53.66592°N 1.83895°W	cntre	1304	The cross commemorates a feud in the 14th century, and it was re-erected in 1808 after being knocked down. It consists of a monolithic stone pillar. The cross is inscribed with coats of arms and inscriptions relating to both events.	II
47 and 49 Quarmby Fold, Quarmby; 53.65170°N 1.82897°W	—	16th century	Part of Quarmby Hall, the building is in stone on a moulded plinth, with a string course, a stone slate roof, catslide to the west, and two storeys. The windows are mullioned or mullioned and transomed, some with hood moulds. On the upper floor is a plaque with a family crest.	II*
59 Quarmby Fold, Quarmby; 53.65174°N 1.82887°W	—	16th century	Part of Quarmby Hall, the building is in stone and has a coped gable on cut kneelers at the front. There are two storeys, and in the main part, the windows are mullioned and transomed. The bay in the left angle has a moulded plinth and a string course, and contains a casement window on the upper floor and a modern window below.	II*
21 Weather Hill Road, Lindley; 53.66335°N 1.83119°W	—	17th or early 18th century	A stone house with a string course on the east, stone gutter brackets, and a stone slate roof catslide at the rear with coped gables on cut kneelers. There are two storeys and the windows are mullioned.	II
Almshouses Archway; 53.66237°N 1.82413°W		17th or early 18th century	The archway to the former almshouses is in stone, and consists of s four-centred arch in an oblong frame. The archway has moulded jambs and with two semicircular recessions along the top.	II
Middle Haigh House, 2 Haigh House; 53.66960°N 1.84203°W	—	17th or early 18th century	The house, which was largely rebuilt in the 19th century, is in stone, partly rendered, and has a stone slate roof. There are two storeys, it contains one three-light mullioned window, and the other windows are 19th-century replacements.	II
Middle Haigh House Farmhouse; 53.66948°N 1.84261°W	—	Early 18th century (or earlier)	A farmhouse and barn in one range, they are roughcast, and have a stone slate roof with a coped gable on a moulded kneeler. There are two storeys, some of the windows are mullioned, and the others are modern. The barn is to the east.	II
10, 11 and 12 Warren House Lane and barn, Ainley Top; 53.66899°N 1.83220°W	—	18th century	The houses and barn are in stone, they have a stone slate roof with coped gable on a moulded kneelers, and two storeys. Some windows are casements, and the others are mullioned with some mullions removed. The barn to the north has barn doors with a segmental arch.	II
Yew Tree, 27 Yew Tree Road, Birchencliffe; 53.66694°N 1.82951°W	—	18th century	A stone house that has a stone slate roof with coped gables and two storeys. The windows are four and six-light mullioned sashes.	II
80 and 82 Cowrakes Lane, Lindley; 53.66172°N 1.83594°W	—	18th century	A pair of rendered houses that have a stone slate roof, catslide at the rear, with coped gables on cut kneelers. There are two storeys, the windows on the upper floor are mullioned with some mullions removed, and the ground floor windows have been altered.	II
43 and 47 East Street, Lindley; 53.66306°N 1.82285°W	—	18th century	A pair of stone houses that have a stone slate roof with coped gables on cut kneelers. There are two storeys, and the windows are mullioned, with some mullions removed from No. 47.	II
7 Oakes Road South, Lindley; 53.65341°N 1.82366°W	—	18th century	A farmhouse and a barn in one range, they are in stone, with stone gutter brackets, and a stone slate roof with coped gables on cut kneelers. The house has two storeys and contains mullioned windows, and in the barn are segmental-headed and flat-headed barn doors, the latter with a re-used lintel.	II
14–18 West Street, Lindley; 53.66247°N 1.82533°W	—	18th century	A row of three stone houses with moulded gutters and a stone slate roof with coped gables on cut kneelers. There are three doorways, the windows are mullioned and the lights have segmental heads, and in the gable end is a Venetian window.	II
46 and 48 West Street, Lindley; 53.66225°N 1.82624°W		18th century	The house, which was later incorporated into a public house, is at the end of a terrace. It is in stone with stone gutter brackets, and a stone slate roof with coped gables on cut kneelers. There are two storeys, two bays, and a rear barn extension. The windows are two-light mullioned sashes, and in the extension are segmental-headed barn doors.	II
20 Thomas Street, Lindley; 53.66174°N 1.82592°W	—	18th century	A stone house with stone gutter consoles, a stone slate roof with coped gables, and two storeys. The windows are mixed, and include casements and sashes, some are mullioned, and at the rear is a six-light staircase window.	II
11 Haigh House Hill and outbuildings, Lindley Top; 53.66810°N 1.84278°W	—	18th century	A stone house that has a stone slate roof and coped gables on cut kneelers. There are two storeys and a single-storey extension to the east. The windows are mullioned with some mullions removed.	II
1 and 1A Kew Hill, Lindley Top; 53.67021°N 1.83790°W	—	18th century	A pair of stone houses with a stone slate roof and two storeys. The windows are mullioned, with some mullions removed, and one light blocked.	II
3, 5 and 11 Quarmby Fold, Quarmby; 53.65156°N 1.82926°W	—	18th century	A group of stone houses with a stone slate roof and two storeys. The ground floor windows have been altered, and on the upper floor are mullioned windows with some mullions removed.	II
13 Quarmby Fold, Quarmby; 53.65159°N 1.82946°W	—	18th century	A stone house with a stone slate roof and two storeys. The windows are mullioned with three lights, and one mullion has been removed.	II
398 New Hey Road, Salendine Nook; 53.65614°N 1.83831°W	—	18th century	A stone house that has a stone slate roof with a coped gable on cut kneelers. There are two storeys, and the windows are mullioned with three or four lights.	II
Hill Grove Farmhouse; 53.66077°N 1.84158°W	—	Mid-18th century	A farmhouse and barn in one range, the barn dating from later in the century. They are in stone, with stone gutter brackets, a stone slate roof with coped gables, and two storeys. The barn contains a doorway with a depressed arch and rusticated voussoirs, an oculus with four keystones, two semicircular lunettes, and an oval plaque.	II
Lower Burn Farmhouse; 53.66804°N 1.81634°W	—	18th century	A stone farmhouse that has a stone slate roof with coped gables on cut kneelers. There are two storeys and three bays. The windows on the front are three-light casements, and at the rear they are mullioned with two or three-lights.	II
Middle Burn Farmhouse; 53.66804°N 1.81793°W	—	18th century	A farmhouse with a barn added in 1798, they are rendered, and have a stone slate roof with a coped gable on cut kneelers. There are two storeys, and the windows are mullioned with some mullions removed. In the barn are modern casement windows.	II
Reap Hirst House; 53.66549°N 1.80652°W	—	18th century	A stone house with raised quoins, a band, stone gutter brackets, and a stone slate roof with coped kneelers on cut kneelers. There are two storeys, a modern porch, and the windows are modern casements in the original openings. In the south end is a blocked door at attic level with a stone balcony cantilevered out below it.	II
Scar Top; 53.66704°N 1.84437°W	—	18th century	The house is rendered, and has a stone slate roof with coped kneelers on cut kneelers. There are two storeys, two bays, and a 19th-century extension at the rear. The windows are modern.	II
The Store; 53.66904°N 1.81911°W	—	18th century	The house is in stone with stone gutter brackets and a stone slate roof, catslide at the rear, with coped gables on cut kneelers. There are two storeys and an L-shaped plan, and the windows are modern casements.	II
Woollen Mill; 53.65926°N 1.84312°W	—	18th century	The mill was extended to the east in the 19th century. It is in stone and has a stone slate roof with coped gables. There are two storeys and five bays. Cantilevered stone steps lead up to a door on the upper floor.	II
Guide stone, Lindley Moor Road; 53.66721°N 1.83921°W		1755	The guide stone is at a road junction, and consists of an upright stone with a rectangular cross-section and a semicircular top. There has been some damage to it, and it is inscribed with elaborate pointing hands, the names of towns and their distances, the date, and the name of the surveyor. The post also carries a benchmark.	II*
Cosy Nook Farmhouse; 53.66734°N 1.80710°W	—	1763	The farmhouse is in stone with a stone slate roof and two storeys. The windows are casements, and there is a round-arched window with a keystone and impost blocks. To the east is a barn, with a single-storey extension to the south and a dated plaque.	II
96–102 Birchencliffe Hill Road, Birchencliffe; 53.66480°N 1.82130°W	—	18th or early 19th century	A row of four stone houses, mainly rendered, with quoins, a sill band, paired stone gutter brackets, and a stone slate roof, catslide at the rear, with coped gables on cut kneelers. There are two storeys and four bays. Most of the windows are mullioned, with some mullions removed, in the centre round-arched window with a keystone and impost blocks, and in the west gable end are blocked oculi.	II
13 Burn Road, Birchencliffe; 53.66535°N 1.82100°W	—	18th or early 19th century	A stone house with a stone slate roof and two storeys. The windows are mullioned and contain sashes.	II
15 Burn Road, Birchencliffe; 53.66541°N 1.82093°W	—	18th or early 19th century	A stone house in a terrace with a stone slate roof, two storeys and one bay. The windows are three-light mullioned sashes.	II
7 Rock Road, Birchencliffe; 53.66539°N 1.82090°W	—	18th or early 19th century	A stone house in a terrace with a stone slate roof, two storeys and one bay. It contains a sash window and a three-light mullioned sash window.	II
9 Rock Road, Birchencliffe; 53.66541°N 1.82104°W	—	18th or early 19th century	A stone house at the end of a terrace with a stone slate roof, and two storeys. It contains a sash window and a three-light mullioned sash window.	II
58–64 Cowrakes Lane, Lindley; 53.66171°N 1.83541°W	—	18th or early 19th century	A terrace of four stone houses with quoins, a band, and a stone slate roof with coped gables on cut kneelers. There are two storeys, and the middle two houses project slightly. The windows are a mix; some are mullioned, some with mullions removed or lights blocked, and there are a casement window, and modern windows in the original openings.	II
1 Weather Hill Road, Lindley; 53.66273°N 1.83096°W	—	18th or early 19th century	A stone house at the end of a row, it has a stone slate roof with a coped gable on cut kneelers. There are two storeys and two bays. In the right bay are casement windows, and the left bay contains four-light mullioned windows.	II
19 Weather Hill Road, Lindley; 53.66322°N 1.83112°W	—	18th or early 19th century	The house is rendered, and has a stone slate roof with coped gables on cut kneelers, and two storeys. The windows on the ground floor are bipartite sashes, and on the upper floor they are mullioned.	II
62 Laund Road, Salendine Nook; 53.65899°N 1.84307°W	—	18th or early 19th century	A stone house in a terrace, it has a stone slate roof with a coped gable. There are two storeys and one bay. The windows are mullioned, with three lights on the upper floor and two on the ground floor.	II
Black Bull Public House; 53.66224°N 1.82636°W		18th or early 19th century	The public house is rendered and has a slate roof, and two storeys. The windows are mullioned, and some mullions have been removed.	II
Boundary stone 53.66532°N 1.84386°W	—	18th or 19th century	The boundary stone, which marks the boundary between Lindley and Old Lindley, is on the southeast side of Lindley Moor Road (A643 road). The stone carries an inscription.	II
25 Yew Tree Road, Birchencliffe; 53.66681°N 1.82967°W	—	Early 19th century (probable)	A stone house with a stone slate roof and two storeys. There is a round-headed window in the gable end and one sash window, and the other windows are mullioned sashes.	II
183 and 185 Quarmby Road, Cliff End; 53.64739°N 1.82550°W	—	Early 19th century	A pair of stone houses with a stone slate roof and two storeys. The windows on the ground floor are modern in the original openings, and on the upper floor they are mullioned.	II
189 Quarmby Road, Cliff End; 53.64739°N 1.82538°W	—	Early 19th century	A stone house with a stone slate roof and two storeys. The windows are two-light mullioned sashes, two on the upper floor, and one on the ground floor.	II
191 Quarmby Road, Cliff End; 53.64744°N 1.82565°W	—	Early 19th century	A stone house with a stone slate roof. There are two storeys, and the windows are mullioned with three lights.	II
93–97 Acre Street, Lindley; 53.65661°N 1.81999°W	—	Early 19th century	A row of three stone houses that have a stone slate roof and two storeys, Nos. 93 and 97 have mullioned windows and the windows in No. 95 have been replaced.	II
75 East Street, Lindley; 53.66287°N 1.82002°W	—	Early 19th century	A stone house in a terrace, with stone gutter brackets, a stone slate roof, and two storeys. The doorway is to the right, above it is a casement window, and the other windows are mullioned with three lights.	II
77 East Street, Lindley; 53.66287°N 1.81996°W	—	Early 19th century	A stone house in a terrace, with stone gutter brackets, a stone slate roof, and two storeys. On the upper floor is a casement window and a three-light mullioned window, and the ground floor contains a later tripartite casement window.	II
79 East Street, Lindley; 53.66287°N 1.81985°W	—	Early 19th century	A stone house at the end of a terrace, with stone gutter brackets, a stone slate roof, and two storeys. On the upper floor are a sash window, a blocked window, and a two-light mullioned window, and the ground floor contains two later casement windows.	II
5 Oakes Road, Lindley; 53.65336°N 1.82378°W	—	Early 19th century	A stone house with a stone slate roof, and two storeys. The windows are mullioned with three lights.	II
1 Temple Street, Lindley; 53.66032°N 1.82373°W	—	Early 19th century	A stone house in a terrace with a stone slate roof. There are two storeys and two bays, and the windows are mullioned. In the right bay is a doorway and a passage door with a two-light window, and in the left bay is a three-light window in each floor.	II
28 and 30 Temple Street, Lindley; 53.66026°N 1.82507°W	—	Early 19th century	A pair of stone houses with a stone slate roof and two storeys. The doorways are to the right, above each is a single-light window, and the other windows are two-light mullioned sashes.	II
3 and 5 Weather Hill Road, Lindley; 53.66271°N 1.83110°W	—	Early 19th century	A pair of stone houses with a sill band, and a stone slate roof with a coped gable on cut kneelers. There are two storeys and four bays, and the windows are sashes.	II
96 West Street, Lindley; 53.66236°N 1.82888°W	—	Early 19th century	A stone house with a stone slate roof and two storeys. On the front are two single-light windows and four two-light mullioned windows, and at the rear are two three-light mullioned windows with some lights blocked.	II
7 and 9 Haigh House Hill, Lindley Top; 53.66848°N 1.84139°W	—	Early 19th century (probable)	A pair of stone houses that have a stone slate roof with coped gables, and two storeys. There is one modern casement window on the upper floor and the other windows are mullioned.	II
Barn South of 5 and 7 Oakes Road South, Oakes; 53.65322°N 1.82413°W	—	Early 19th century	A stone barn with stone gutter brackets, a stone slate roof with coped gables, and two storeys. It contains segment-headed barn doors and a doorway, and there are semicircular lunettes in both fronts.	II
35–39 Quarmby Fold, Quarmby; 53.65185°N 1.82910°W	—	Early 19th century	A row of three stone houses at the end of a terrace, they have a stone slate roof with a coped gable on a cut kneeler. There are two storeys and six bays, and the windows are modern in the original openings.	II
55 Quarmby Fold, Quarmby; 53.65157°N 1.82889°W	—	Early 19th century	A stone house with a stone slate roof and two storeys. There are two doorways, and the windows are mullioned, with one mullion removed.	II
61 Quarmby Fold, Quarmby; 53.65179°N 1.82879°W	—	Early 19th century	The house is rendered, and has a stone slate roof and two storeys. The windows are mullioned with four lights.	II
91 and 93 Moor Hill Road, Salendine Nook; 53.65743°N 1.84204°W		Early 19th century	A pair of stone houses that have a stone slate roof with coped gables, and three storeys. Above the central doorway is a round-arched window with imposts and a keystone. The other windows are sashes, some of which are mullioned. In the right gable end is a blocked first floor window and remaining traces of cantilevered steps.	II
390 New Hey Road, Salendine Nook; 53.65596°N 1.83825°W	—	Early 19th century	A stone house in a group, with stone gutter brackets, a stone slate roof with a coped gable, and two storeys. There is one casement window, one sash window, and the other windows are mullioned.	II
Centre Block and Tower, Acre Mills; 53.65551°N 1.81951°W	—	Early 19th century	The older part is the central block, with the tower dating from the mid-19th century; both parts are in stone. The block has a stone slate roof with coped gables, four storeys and attics, a front of 13 bays, and sides of four bays. Over the middle five bays on the front is a pediment-shaped gable, and a Venetian window in the attic. The tower has a string course, a moulded cornice on console-shaped brackets, and an embattled parapet. The windows are round-arched, with an oculus at attic level.	II
Barn to rear of Briar Mount; 53.66960°N 1.81853°W	—	Early 19th century (probable)	A stone barn with stone gutter brackets and a stone slate roof. There are two storeys and a single-storey extension to the west. The barn contains windows, a segment-headed barn door and a stable door.	II
Coach house west of Fieldhead; 53.65951°N 1.82350°W	—	Early 19th century	The coach house is in stone with stone gutter brackets, and a stone slate roof with coped gables. On the east front is a shallow pediment-shaped gable with a cast iron weathervane, a semicircular lunette, and a shelf. The windows are modern, and in the south gable end is a blocked round-headed window or loading door.	II
Lower Haigh House; 53.66856°N 1.84707°W	—	Early 19th century	A farmhouse and barn in one range, they are in stone with a stone slate roof. There are two storeys and a basement, with buttresses on the north, and the windows are mullioned. The barn to the west has barn doors with a segmental arch.	II
Middle Haigh House, 3 Haigh House; 53.66940°N 1.84213°W	—	Early 19th century	A stone house with a stone slate roof. There are two storeys and the windows are mullioned.	II
187 Quarmby Road, Cliff End; 53.64733°N 1.82537°W	—	1829	A stone house, rendered on the front, that has a stone slate roof with a coped gable. There are two storeys and an attic. The windows on the ground floor are modern in the original openings, and on the upper floor they are mullioned with three lights. The gable end contains a single-light round-arched window with the date and an inscription.	II
St Stephen's Church, Lindley; 53.65889°N 1.82252°W		1829	The church was designed by John Oates in Early English style, and the chancel was added in 1872. The church is built in sandstone with a slate roof, and consists of a nave, a south porch, a chancel with north and south vestries and a north organ chamber, and a west tower. The tower has four stages, angle buttresses, a south door, and an embattled parapet with corner pinnacles. The windows on the sides of the church are lancets and the five-light east window is in Decorated style.	II
Barn adjacent to 72 Laund Road; 53.65926°N 1.84343°W	—	1834	The barn, which has been converted for residential use, is in stone and has a stone slate roof, catslide at the rear. It contains barn doors with a depressed arch and a dated keystone, and above is a semicircular lunette.	II
23 and 25 Temple Street, Lindley; 53.66017°N 1.82473°W	—	Early or mid-19th century	A pair of stone houses with a stone slate roof and two storeys. The doorways are in the outer parts, above is a single-light window, and the other windows are mullioned with two lights.	II
Crosland Road Farmhouse; 53.66323°N 1.83777°W	—	Early or mid-19th century	The farmhouse is in stone with stone gutter brackets, a stone slate roof, and two storeys. The original part and an extension to the west contain mullioned windows, and to the east is an extension with sash windows.	II
Guide post, New Hey Road; 53.65672°N 1.84371°W		Early or mid-19th century	The guide post has been moved from its original position and set in a wall on the north side of the road. It is a monolith with a square section and the top chamfered to form a pediment over each face. It is inscribed with pointing hands and the directions to Lindley and to Longley.	II
Barn adjacent to 29 Quarmby Fold; 53.65203°N 1.82949°W	—	1840	A stone barn with stone gutter brackets, a stone slate roof with coped gables, and two storeys. To the right are segment-headed barn doors with a dated keystone and a semicircular lunette above, and to the left are two windows, a doorway and a loading door above.	II
Salendine Nook Baptist Chapel; 53.65725°N 1.84109°W		1843	In 1893 the porch was added to the chapel, which is in stone with a slate roof. There are two storeys and a basement, three bays on the front, and four on the sides. On the front is a pediment containing an oculus with an inscribed apron below. The ground floor projects and contains two doorways flanked by fluted pilasters with Composite capitals. The doorways have chamfered surrounds, moulded keystones, and carved spandrels. Outside these are round-headed windows with moulded surrounds, keystones and sunk moulded aprons, and above is a parapet with a balustrade. On the upper storey is a Venetian window flanked by round-headed sash windows.	II
Gate piers, 55 New Hey Road; 53.65255°N 1.81617°W	—	Mid-19th century	The gate piers at the entrance to the garden are in stone. They are panelled, and have cornices and semicircular caps.	II
Gate piers, 2 Thornhill Road; 53.65724°N 1.81008°W	—	Mid-19th century	The gate piers at the entrance to the drive are in stone. They are cylindrical, with moulded cornices and ball finials. The gates are in cast iron and have an elaborate arabesque pattern.	II
Gate piers, 3 and 3A Thornhill Road; 53.65700°N 1.81023°W	—	Mid-19th century	The gate piers at the entrance to the drive are in stone. They are chamfered and each has a modillion cornice and pediment-shaped acroteria. They are flanked by quadrant balustrades, with square balusters and a moulded rail with an inverted pyramid shape.	II
Gate piers, 6 Thornhill Road; 53.65684°N 1.81059°W	—	Mid-19th century	The gate piers at the entrance to the garden are in stone. They have square bases, octagonal tops, moulded cornices and pyramidal caps. The gates are in timber.	II
Gate piers, 8 Thornhill Road; 53.65652°N 1.81077°W	—	Mid-19th century	The gate piers at the entrance to the garden are in stone. They are panelled, with moulded plinths, and are decorated with incised circles.	II
248 Quarmby Road, Cliff End; 53.64923°N 1.82530°W	—	Mid-19th century	A stone house with rusticated quoins, a moulded eaves cornice and blocking course, and a hipped slate roof. There are two storeys and three bays. The central doorway has Tuscan pilasters, a full entablature and a blocking course. To the right is a canted bay window, Tuscan piers, an ornamental frieze, and a blocking course, and the windows are sashes.	II
Former coach house adjacent to 35 East Street, Lindley; 53.66288°N 1.82312°W	—	Mid-19th century	The former coach house is in stone with stone gutter brackets, and a stone slate roof. It contains a carriage entrance with a depressed arch, and three oculi.	II
6 Lidget Street, Lindley; 53.65959°N 1.82220°W	—	Mid-19th century	A stone house with rusticated quoins, a moulded eaves cornice, and a hipped slate roof. There are two storeys and three bays. In the centre is a Tuscan porch with a coved cornice, under which are panels containing inset balls, and the windows are sashes.	II
8 Lidget Street, Lindley; 53.65994°N 1.82267°W	—	Mid-19th century	A stone house with a moulded eaves cornice, a blocking course with three panelled dies, and a stone slate roof with coped gables. There are two storeys and two bays. The doorway has an oblong fanlight, and the windows are sashes.	II
Acre House; 53.65635°N 1.81913°W	—	Mid-19th century	A stone house with a band, a moulded eaves cornice, a blocking course, and a hipped slate roof. There are two storeys and four bays. Most of the windows are sashes, some are tripartite, and one has Ionic pilasters. At the rear is a canted bay window with Tuscan piers and an entablature, and the doorway has Tuscan columns and an entablature.	II
Gate piers, Acre House; 53.65593°N 1.81909°W	—	Mid-19th century	The gate piers at the entrance to the grounds are in stone. They have fielded panels, and each pier has a fluted frieze, a modillion cornice, and a plain cap.	II
Brunswick House; 53.66278°N 1.82369°W	—	Mid-19th century	A stone house with corner pilasters, a moulded eaves cornice, a blocking course with a central panel. pediment-shaped to the sides, and a hipped slate roof. There are two storeys and an attic, and a symmetrical front of three bays. In the centre is a Tuscan porch with a full entablature and a blocking course with a sculpted wreath. The doorway has a fanlight, and the windows are sashes.	II
Buckden Mount; 53.65672°N 1.81096°W	—	Mid-19th century	A stone house with string courses, deeply overhanging eaves on cast iron fretwork brackets, and slate roofs. There are two storeys and attics, and a complex plan. The windows are sashes, some with moulded surrounds, and some with hood moulds. Other features include rusticated voussoirs, and moulded impost bands.	II
East Royd; 53.66249°N 1.82136°W	—	Mid-19th century	A stone house with rusticated quoins, a modillioned eaves cornice, a blocking course, and a hipped slate roof. There are two storeys and three bays, the middle bay projecting. On the front is a later porch, and the windows are sashes.	II
Fernleigh; 53.65632°N 1.81132°W	—	Mid-19th century	A stone house with sill bands, stone bracketed eaves, and a slate roof with coped gables. There are two storeys and attics, and a front of four bays. The outer bays are gabled and each contains a canted bay window with a carved and moulded cornice and a parapet with trilobe ornament, and on the upper floor is a sash window with a hood mould. In the centre, the left bay has a hipped and sprocketed truncated pyramidal roof with ornamental iron finials at the corners. The right bay contains an oblong bay window with a parapet, and in the right return is a three-storey tower with a pyramidal roof and iron cresting.	II
Fieldhead; 53.65945°N 1.82308°W	—	Mid-19th century	A stone house with a moulded eaves cornice, a blocking course, and a stone slate roof with a coped gable. There are two storeys and a front of three bays. In the centre is a Tuscan porch with a full entablature and a blocking course. This is flanked by canted bay windows with moulded cornices, and on the upper floor are sash windows. To the left is a two-storey three-bay extension with similar features.	II
Holly Bank; 53.65192°N 1.83042°W	—	Mid-19th century	A stone house with rusticated quoins, a moulded eaves cornice and blocking course, and a hipped stone slate roof. There are two storeys and four bays. The doorway has Ionic pilasters, an oblong fanlight, a full entablature, and a pediment-shaped blocking course with a sculpted wreath. There are two bay windows, one in timber, and the other canted with Tuscan piers. The windows are sashes with moulded surrounds.	II
Gate piers and railings, Marsh Liberal Club; 53.65195°N 1.81340°W	—	Mid-19th century	There are two pairs of stone gate piers, both are panelled, one pair has pyramidal tops, and the other has caps. The railings are in cast iron and have spear finials.	II
Lodge, Oakes School; 53.65491°N 1.82392°W	—	Mid-19th century	The lodge is in stone, and has a slate roof with overhanging eaves and gables with bargeboards on paired brackets. There are two storeys, and the windows are lancets with sashes. On the ground floor is a canted bay window and a timber porch, both with hipped roofs.	II
Gate piers, Park House; 53.65696°N 1.82025°W	—	Mid-19th century	The gate piers are in stone and are panelled. Each pier has a moulded cornice and a vermiculated semicircular top.	II
Portland House; 53.65243°N 1.81630°W	—	Mid-19th century	A stone house with a moulded eaves cornice and blocking course, and a hipped stone slate roof. There are two storeys and three bays, the middle bay projecting under a pediment-shaped blocking course with a sculpted wreath. The door has a modern porch with a full entablature and a blocking course with sculpted wreath, and the windows are sashes.	II
Ravensdean Lodge; 53.65685°N 1.81017°W	—	Mid-19th century	The lodge is in stone with a hipped slate roof and one storey. In the centre is a canted projection with a hipped roof and a bracketed eaves cornice. The windows are round-headed sashes with keystones, moulded voussoirs, and moulded imposts.	II
Rein Wood; 53.64902°N 1.81956°W	—	Mid-19th century	A large stone house with moulded and coped eaves on brackets, a slate roof, and two storeys. On the front are three bays, the outer bays gabled. The porch has a dentilled cornice, and the doorway has a semicircular fanlight, foliage moulded impost bands, moulded voussoirs, and a keystone with an over-life size portrait bust. The outer bays contain two-light sash windows with Tuscan piers and a full dentilled entablature, and to the south is an oblong bay window. The garden front contains a three-storey tower with a hipped roof, two-storey and one-storey oblong bay windows, and a conservatory.	II
Gate piers, Salendine Nook Baptist Chapel; 53.65689°N 1.84191°W	—	Mid-19th century	The gate piers at the two entrances to the churchyard are in stone, they are panelled, and have pyramidal caps. The gates are in cast iron and have spear finials.	II
Springfield; 53.65759°N 1.81023°W	—	Mid-19th century	A stone house with moulded string courses, overhanging eaves, and a hipped slate roof. There are two storeys and a front of three bays. The left bay projects and contains a two-storey canted bay window that has a cornice with machicolations between the storeys, and a moulded cornice with cresting above. Steps with curved walls lead up to the porch that has paired columns with foliate capitals, relief sculpture in the spandrels, and a parapet with urn finials. The windows on the ground floor are casements with depressed arches, and on the upper floor they are sashes with round heads. In the garden front are two bay windows, one canted, the other oblong with a Venetian window.	II
Gate piers, St Stephen's Church; 53.65832°N 1.82221°W	—	Mid-19th century	The gate piers at the entrance to the churchyard from Plover Road are in stone and are panelled. The gates are in cast iron and are ornate.	II
The Wood; 53.67023°N 1.81514°W	—	Mid-19th century	A stone house with a band, a moulded eaves cornice, a parapet, and a stone slate roof. There are two storeys and three bays. The doorway has a moulded surround, an oblong fanlight, and a segmental pediment. The windows are sashes, and there is a staircase window at the rear.	II
Barn, The Wood; 53.67018°N 1.81472°W	—	Mid-19th century	The barn is in stone, and has a stone slate roof with coped gables and two storeys. The middle part of the east front projects under a pediment, under which is a Venetian window and a depressed arch. In the west front is an arched entrance with a blocked surround.	II
Thornhill; 53.65703°N 1.81080°W	—	Mid-19th century	A stone house with a moulded eaves cornice, and a slate roof with coped gables on kneelers. There are two storeys and attics, and a front of three bays, the outer bays gabled and projecting. The doorway in the middle bay has a moulded surround, a fanlight, and a hood mould. In the left bay is a canted bay window with panelled spandrels, a moulded cornice, and a patterned parapet, and in the right bay is an oblong bay window with similar features. The windows are sashes, most with trefoil-headed lights, and in the middle bay is a wrought iron balcony.	II
Front Tower, Wellington Mills; 53.65491°N 1.82561°W		Mid-19th century	The tower is in stone with bands, a moulded eaves cornice on brackets, and a hipped slate roof with ornate cast iron cresting. There are four stages and an attic, and two bays. On the ground floor is a segmental arch with vermiculated voussoirs and moulded imposts, and above it is an inscribed frieze. The archway contains cast iron gates with fleur-de-lys finials, and in the upper stages are round-arched sash windows with keystones.	II
Tall block, Wellington Mills; 53.65486°N 1.82609°W	—	Mid-19th century	The building is in stone, and has a double-pitched stone slate roof with coped gables and a parapet between. There are five storeys, twelve bays on the front and four bays on the sides. The windows are sashes, on the ground floor they are round-arched with vermiculated voussoirs. The tower has string courses, a moulded cornice on large brackets, a blocking course, and a flat top, and it contains lancet windows.	II
Stables, Holly Bank; 53.65176°N 1.83088°W	—	1853	The former stables are in stone, with a band, rusticated quoins, and a stone slate roof with coped gables and finials. There are three storeys and three bays, the middle bay projecting under a shaped gable with a weathervane. On the ground floor are three doorways with fanlights. In the middle bay of the middle floor is a French window with a semicircular head, a keystone and a balcony. There are smaller semicircular-headed windows above and in the outer bays, and an oculus in each outer bay.	II
51 Lidget Street, Lindley; 53.66051°N 1.82358°W	—	1859	A stone shop with a stone slate roof, two storeys and three bays. The top floor contains casement windows. On the ground floor is a yard entry on the left with an initialled and dated lintel, and to the right is a shop front with Tuscan pilasters, a fascia, and a moulded cornice, a doorway with a fanlight, and a window with four round-arched lights and mullions.	II
Lamp post, Salendine Nook Baptist Chapel; 53.65735°N 1.84146°W	—	Mid- to late 19th century	The lamp post is by the west door of the chapel, and is in cast iron. It has an elaborate bulbous base, an ornamented post, and a hexagonal lamp with ornamental cresting.	II
Lindley Methodist Church; 53.66289°N 1.82185°W		1867–68	Additions, including a chancel and a vestry, were made in 1895–96 by Edgar Wood. The church is in stone with a slate roof, and is in Gothic style. It consists of a nave with aisles, a transept, a chancel, and a southwest tower. The tower has a pyramidal roof with a finial.	II
Oakes Baptist Church; 53.65459°N 1.82361°W		1867–68	The church is in stone with a vermiculated basement, rusticated quoins, bands, continuous impost moulding, a moulded eaves cornice, and a slate roof. There are two storeys and a basement, five bays on the front, and six on the sides. On the front, the middle three bays project with flanking pilasters, and there is a full-width pediment containing a semicircular lunette with a vermiculated keystone and acanthus carving in the tympanum. The porch has three-quarter columns and pilasters, and a full entablature with a modillion cornice and blocking course. The windows are sashes, with round heads on the upper floor and segmental heads on the ground floor.	II
Gates, Oakes Baptist Church; 53.65462°N 1.82404°W	—	c. 1867–68	At the main entrance to the churchyard in Oakes Road are a pair of elaborate gates and gate piers in cast iron, and at the entrance in Baker Street there is one simpler gate.	II
Oakes School; 53.65504°N 1.82332°W		1873	The school, which was extended in 1885, is in stone, and has a slate roof with coped gables and iron finials. There is one storey and an attic, and a complex plan with many gables. The doorways have moulded surrounds and hood moulds, the windows are mullioned or mullioned and transomed, and there are some cusped oculi. Above the boys' entrance is a four-stage tower with string courses, clock faces, a machicolated cornice, and a steep pyramidal roof with lucarnes.	II
Walls, Oakes School; 53.65481°N 1.82356°W	—	c. 1873	Enclosing the grounds of the school are dwarf coped stone walls carrying cast iron railings with decorative finials. The gate piers are in stone, and have conical caps.	II
Lych gate, St Stephen's Church; 53.65894°N 1.82203°W		Late 19th century	The lych gate is at the entrance to the churchyard from Lidget Street. The superstructure is in timber on stone plinths, and the roof is in stone slate.	II
St Philip's Church, Birchencliffe; 53.66564°N 1.82109°W		1876–77	The chancel was added in 1879–80. The church is in Decorated style, and is built in sandstone with dressings in freestone and a slate roof with ridge tiles. It consists of a nave, a north aisle, a northwest tower, a chancel, and a south organ chamber. The tower contains a porch, it has diagonal buttresses, and a saddleback roof.	II
Briarcourt; 53.65799°N 1.81730°W		1894–95	A large house designed by Edgar Wood with Arts and Crafts features and later extended, it is in stone with a stone slate roof and coped gables. There are two storeys and attics. On the front is a gabled two-storey porch with ball finials, and above the doorway is a cornice with a decorative cartouche. To the right is a two-storey canted bay window with a parapet, and the other windows are mullioned and transomed.	II
Norman Terrace; 53.65992°N 1.82309°W	—	1898	A terrace of three houses designed by Edgar Wood, they are in stone with overhanging eaves and a stone slate roof. There are two storeys and each house has two bays, the right bay gabled, and the middle gable the largest. The doorways are in the left bay, and each has an oblong fanlight, a plain hood, and a shaped lintel. Above the doorways are two-light casement windows, and the other windows are mullioned and transomed.	II
Wall and gates, Norman Terrace; 53.65994°N 1.82300°W	—	1898	Designed by Edgar Wood, dwarf walls with coping run along the front of the gardens. They contain simple stone piers, and simple timber gates.	II
Gatehouse; 53.65882°N 1.83121°W		1900	The building was designed by Edgar Wood, and is in stone with a stone slate roof and two storeys. On the right is a carriage arch with a moulded surround and a hood mould, and above it is a mullioned window and a gable. Elsewhere are mullioned or mullioned and transomed windows, and the doorway within the archway has a four-centred arched head. To the left is a single-storey extension and at the rear is a tower with a pyramidal roof.	II
Banney Royd; 53.65945°N 1.80974°W	—	1900–01	A house designed by Edgar Wood in Neo-Tudor style with art nouveau features, it is in stone and has a stone slate roof with coped gables. There are two storeys and an irregular plan. The two-storey porch is gabled with a finial, and has diagonal buttresses with moulded cornices. The doorway is round-arched with foliage corbels, a decorative keystone, and a deep hood mould. Above the doorway is a window with a moulded hood mould. The windows are mullioned and transomed.	I
Gate piers, Banney Royd; 53.65877°N 1.81036°W	—	1900–01	The gate piers at the entrance to the drive are in stone, and are simple, with tapering buttresses and ball finials. They are flanked by quadrant walls with chamfered coping.	II
Lindley Clock Tower; 53.65884°N 1.82169°W		1902	The clock tower was designed by Edgar Wood, and the sculpture and roof are by Thomas Stirling Lee. The tower is in stone, and the octagonal pagoda roof is in copper. The tower has diagonal corner buttresses rising to pinnacles with gargoyles, a semicircular stair turret, a clock face on each side, and an arcade below the eaves. The doorway has a lintel with an inscription, a central sculpted figure, further sculpted figures to the sides, and another one above. The windows have art nouveau tracery.	II*
Ridgemount; 53.65827°N 1.81587°W	—	1922–23	A stone house with a stone slate roof, coped gables linked by parapets, and Arts and Crafts features. There are two storeys, and the windows are mullioned and transomed. The porch has an embattled parapet and a door with cornices. At the east end is a broad canted bay window.	II
