= Save Huddersfield NHS =

Minor British political party

Save Huddersfield NHS was a minor British political party registered in 2006. The party campaigned against a proposed reorganisation of National Health Service facilities in the Huddersfield area and was led by Dr. Jackie Grunsell, a local general practitioner and member of Socialist Alternative. The party contested elections to Kirklees Council, West Yorkshire, England in 2006–2008. The party was deregistered in 2010.

== Formation ==
The organisation was initially formed as a pressure group after a public meeting in February 2006 against the Kirklees and Calderdale NHS Trust Board's proposals to close St. Lukes Hospital and transfer services (including maternity care) from Huddersfield to Halifax and Wakefield. The group organised a petition signed by over 50,000 people opposing the changes and three protest marches. On 21 March 2006 Save Huddersfield NHS was registered as a political party with the Electoral Commission.

== Electoral contests ==
The party nominated three candidates to contest the elections to Kirklees Borough Council in May 2006. Dr. Grunsell, the party leader, was elected for Crosland Moor and Netherton ward with a majority of 807, defeating the sitting Liberal Democrat councillor. She claimed her election was due to the electorate's disillusion with "mainstream parties" and warned that "this sends a very clear message to all those parties that you need to fight for the people you represent if you want to maintain your positions – or people who are prepared to stand and fight will take those positions from you." She went to explain that her party would not limit themselves to health issues, but would "fight on other issues".

In the following year the party stood a single candidate, again contesting the Crosland Moor and Neteherton ward. Like Grunsell, the candidate was an active Socialist Party member. He failed to be elected. The 2008 local elections were the last contested by the party: the same candidate contested the same ward as in the previous year. The party slipped into third place, behind the Labour and Conservative parties.

== Loss of council seat ==
Although still listed as leader of Save Huddersfield NHS in April 2010, Grunsell defended her seat on Kirklees Council at the 2010 elections as a Trade Unionist and Socialist Coalition candidate. She was defeated, falling to fourth place with 1472 votes.

== Later developments ==
The broad coalition that gave rise to Save Huddersfield NHS fragmented after the 2010 election, and the party deregistered. In 2014 a group of local activists, several of whom had been involved in the original 2006 movement, and all of whom were incensed by the coalition government's plans to restructure the health service, as well as proposals to close Accident and Emergency Services at Calderdale Royal Hospital, founded a Huddersfield chapter of the national campaign group, Keep Our NHS Public. Its primary aim, according to the secretary, Richard Murgatroyd, is to alert "the public about what is going on and why it matters to local people."

== See also ==
- National Health Action Party
