= Lindley, Huddersfield =

Suburb of Huddersfield, West Yorkshire, England

Coordinates: 53.663077°N 1.825189°W

Lindley
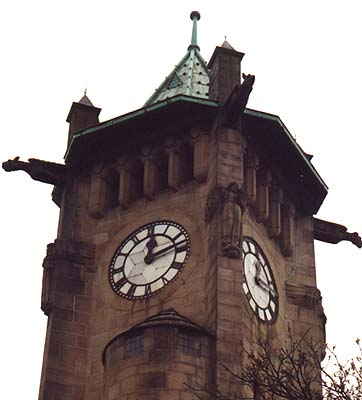
- Lindley Clock Tower

- Location within West Yorkshire
- OS grid reference: SE115185
  - London: 165 mi (266 km) SE
- Metropolitan borough: Kirklees
- Metropolitan county: West Yorkshire
- Region: Yorkshire and the Humber
- Country: England
- Sovereign state: United Kingdom
- Post town: HUDDERSFIELD
- Postcode district: HD3
- Dialling code: 01484
- Police: West Yorkshire
- Fire: West Yorkshire
- Ambulance: Yorkshire
- UK Parliament: Colne Valley

Lindley is a suburb of Huddersfield, within the metropolitan borough of Kirklees in West Yorkshire, England. It is approximately 2 miles (3 km) northwest from Huddersfield town centre.

The Huddersfield Royal Infirmary, Huddersfield's main hospital, is in Lindley. It is run by Calderdale and Huddersfield NHS Foundation Trust. In 1951, the scheme for building the new Infirmary was announced, at an initial cost of £5.5 million. Work started in 1957, but progress was slow. The hospital was officially opened only in 1967, by Prime Minister Harold Wilson, born in Huddersfield. Plans were approved in September 2021 for a new A&E department the existing 1960s A&E was "reaching near the end of its functional life and is no longer fit for purpose" according to the Director of Transformation and Partnerships for CHFT.

== History ==
The name for Lindley comes from the Saxon for "flax meadow" or possibly from the Germanic word 'lind' denoting an area of linden (or lime) trees.

Probably established by the Angles in the 7th century as a farming community, it is mentioned in the Domesday Book of 1086 under the names "Lilleia". In the reign of Edward the Confessor it was owned by Godwin, and in the reign of William the Conqueror it was being cultivated by Ulchel for Ilbert de Lacy, the Sheriff of Hertfordshire and descendant of the French noble family from Lassy. At that time, Lindley consisted of two farmsteads totalling "5 quarantens by 2 quarantens".

The Lindley Clock Tower is the most prominent landmark in Lindley, standing at the junction between Lidget Street and Daisy Lea Lane. This Art Nouveau clock tower was designed by the Manchester architect Edgar Wood in 1900 and erected by James Nield Sykes JP, in 1902. The tower also features four buttress figures, four gargoyles and four friezes. The top of the tower is accessible via the doorway at its foot.

Another key building in Lindley is Lindley Liberal Club, situated adjacent to Lindley Clock Tower. The club has been in existence since its foundation stone was laid on 9 August 1887. The club came into use when building was completed the following year.

Lindley appeared top in a survey carried out in 2006 by the Royal Bank of Scotland. By creating an algorithm factoring aspects such as desirability, return on investment and affordability, the survey results listed the top 10 locations throughout the UK for first time buyers to get on the property ladder.

== Climate ==
Climate data for Huddersfield/Oakes 1981–2010 (210 metres elevation)
Month	Jan	Feb	Mar	Apr	May	Jun	Jul	Aug	Sep	Oct	Nov	Dec	Year
Mean daily maximum °C (°F)	6.0 (42.8)	6.2 (43.2)	8.8 (47.8)	11.6 (52.9)	15.3 (59.5)	18.1 (64.6)	20.1 (68.2)	19.1 (66.4)	17.0 (62.6)	12.9 (55.2)	8.7 (47.7)	6.1 (43.0)	15.5 (59.9)
Mean daily minimum °C (°F)	0.8 (33.4)	0.5 (32.9)	2.3 (36.1)	3.7 (38.7)	6.1 (43.0)	8.7 (47.7)	10.9 (51.6)	10.9 (51.6)	9.1 (48.4)	6.4 (43.5)	3.3 (37.9)	1.0 (33.8)	5.3 (41.5)
Average rainfall mm (inches)	111.5 (4.39)	70.3 (2.77)	82.2 (3.24)	76.9 (3.03)	62.4 (2.46)	78.2 (3.08)	63.7 (2.51)	81.4 (3.20)	75.8 (2.98)	107.7 (4.24)	104.5 (4.11)	114.0 (4.49)	1,028.4 (40.49)
Average rainy days (≥ 1.0 mm)	15.7	13.2	13.7	10.9	10.9	11.5	10.1	11.9	11.4	14.1	15.8	15.2	154.4
Mean monthly sunshine hours	51.5	64.8	96.0	134.2	167.1	153.5	172.5	161.0	126.6	101.3	57.8	50.2	1,336.3
Source: Met Office

== Band ==
Lindley Band was formed in the late 1830s and has been a major band in Huddersfield for most of its history. It was one of the leading bands in the UK from 1880 to 1910. The band were featured in a 2008 episode of Life on Mars and also appeared in a 1950s film called Asylum. It is currently in the first section.

== Schools ==
Lindley Junior and Infants School is situated on George Street next to a housing estate. It caters for age group 4 to 11, with an enrolment of approximately 500 pupils.

== See also ==
- Listed buildings in Huddersfield (Lindley Ward)
