= Salendine Nook =

Area of Huddersfield, West Yorkshire, England

Coordinates: 53.658°N 1.838°W

- Location within West Yorkshire
- OS grid reference: SE107179
- Metropolitan borough: Kirklees
- Metropolitan county: West Yorkshire
- Region: Yorkshire and the Humber
- Country: England
- Sovereign state: United Kingdom
- Post town: HUDDERSFIELD
- Postcode district: HD3
- Dialling code: 01484
- Police: West Yorkshire
- Fire: West Yorkshire
- Ambulance: Yorkshire
- UK Parliament: Huddersfield

Salendine Nook is an area of Huddersfield in West Yorkshire, England. It is 2 miles (3 km) to the north-west of central Huddersfield, and is bordered to the north-east by Laund Hill, Weather Hill and Low Hill and to the south-west by the natural scar of Longwood Edge, above the suburb of Longwood. Longwood Edge affords a panoramic view across the Colne Valley to Crosland Moor on the other side.

Salendine Nook lies between Quarmby and Outlane on a tributary to the textile industries' Packhorse road across the Pennines. Architecturally, the area features traditional weavers' cottages exhibiting vestiges of workshop entrances near the cross roads at its centre as well as dwellings associated with potteries and farms.

Huddersfield New College and Salendine Nook High School are both situated at Salendine Nook, with their playing fields extending out to Longwood Edge.

== History ==
Although there is no record of Salendine Nook in the 1086 Domesday Book nearby Lindley (Lilleia) and Quarmby (Cornebi) are both mentioned, albeit as `waste'. One explanation is that Salendine refers to the greater celandine, part of the poppy family. "Nook" means secluded place or corner. So it is speculated that Salendine Nook was so named because it was a secluded place or corner where the celandine plant grew in abundance.

The first recorded evidence of a dwelling appears in 1522 when reference is made to the dwelling of William Hague of "Salnden", one many clothiers living in the area. The Mortons, who became a major influence in the area, are believed to have settled in Salendine Nook towards the end of the 16th century. In 1558, Edmond de Morton and "a numerous Scotch family", fled from religious persecution in Scotland to find a home south of the border. They settled in a part of Huddersfield known as Salendine Nook.

=== Pottery ===
The Mortons were potters, and the area attracted them because it was the source of a special type of very pure clay worked for the manufacture of earthenware pottery.

The clay was found in the seat-earths in a geological formation known as the Lower Coal Measures at Lockwood Scar, Lindley Moor and Salendine Nook. The clay was extracted and mixed with local river sand to make it suitable for manufacture of pottery. Nearby hilltops provided the perfect site for kilns since the wind aided the flue draught and increased the firing temperature of the oven. Cooking pots, puncheons and jugs were produced for sale in the district. One branch of the family specialising in pot manufacture was known as the "Pot'oon Mortons". In addition to pottery, Mortons took up farming and worked as clothiers.

There is evidence of a pottery business run by Mortons in the early 18th century on the modern housing estate of the Laund Road. The last Morton pottery business closed in the 1980s.

=== Salendine Nook Baptist Church ===
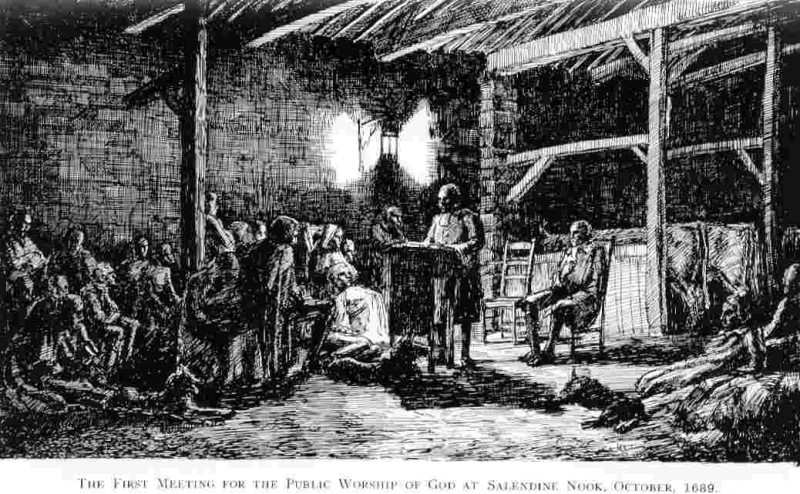
The First Meeting for the Public Worship of God at Salendine Nook, October 1689

One of their descendants, Michael Morton registered his barn in October 1689 as a meeting house for Protestant dissenters and established the building as a religious site, which in time became a Baptist chapel that is still in use today. The Toleration Act of the same year allowed for a degree of religious freedom which had not existed before. Percy Stock in his book Foundations described how difficult the congregation found it to adjust to their new-found freedom:

"The October evening wind flows coldly over the moorland. The houses are few and widely scattered. Lights shine here and there but one is more brilliant than the rest. Men and women are excitedly approaching the light. They are just plain folk, the women with shawls on their heads and clogs on their feet. The scene is in an ancient barn. The door opens and two men come through, one is old, the other of middle age. The old man rises and the service begins as he reads Isaiah Chapter 40 … Comfort Ye My People …The sermon has as its text 'Watchman, what of the night? The Morning cometh' and the speaker recounts the difficulties under which his followers have laboured. At this point he shows them a piece of paper – their licence – and dwells on what this means. The blessed morning has come. The big barn doors are open for public worship and, please God, the open door shall never be taken away again. Finally, he commends them for keeping alight the flame of the blessed Gospel in that place. The meeting ended with the singing of the 124th Psalm – not very well rendered for this was the first time they had ever dared to sing together aloud."

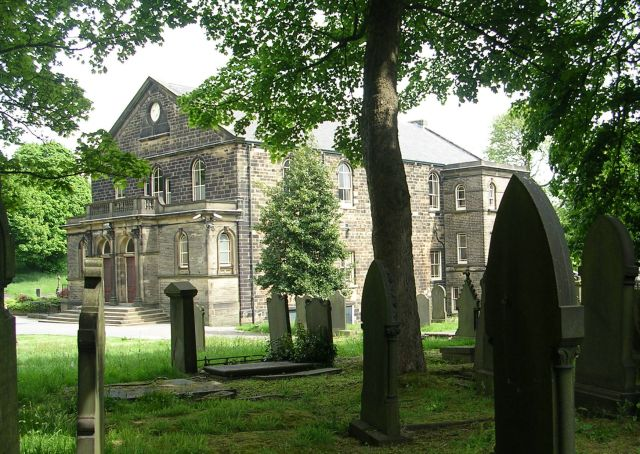
Salendine Nook Baptist Church – Laund Road

A meeting house was opened on the land of Joseph Morton between in 1743, and was replaced by a larger one in 1803. The current Baptist Chapel was built in 1843.

== Notable people ==
John Morton and Samuel Brighouse were two of The Three Greenhorns who emigrated to Canada in 1862 and bought land in the area that today is known as the West End, Vancouver.

== Salendine Nook today ==
Salendine Nook is set in a picturesque location in the outskirts of Huddersfield. It has a wide range of facilities including a number of sports clubs. There reminders of the past in the road names and buildings, such as Kiln Court, Pottery Street, Morton Way, and the chapel. The highschool is also known as 'Sally Nook' to the locals. The 3 main feeder schools are Lindley Juniors, Moorlands Primary and Reinwood Juniors. It is one of the best comprehensives in Kirklees with over 75% achieving C-A*'s. There are about 1300 students in the highschool; that is a vast amount considering the highschool has no 6th form (years 7–11) – but there is a college on the same site, called New College. Many graduates also go to Greenhead College.

== See also ==
- Listed buildings in Huddersfield (Lindley Ward)
