= Quarmby =

District of Huddersfield, West Yorkshire

Coordinates: 53.652°N 1.831°W

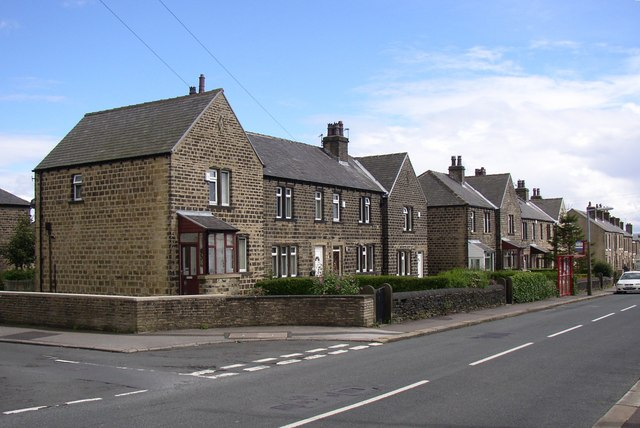
- Houses along Quarmby Road

- Location within West Yorkshire
- Metropolitan borough: Kirklees
- Metropolitan county: West Yorkshire
- Region: Yorkshire and the Humber
- Country: England
- Sovereign state: United Kingdom
- Post town: HUDDERSFIELD
- Postcode district: HD2
- Dialling code: 01484
- Police: West Yorkshire
- Fire: West Yorkshire
- Ambulance: Yorkshire
- UK Parliament: Huddersfield

Quarmby is a district of Huddersfield, West Yorkshire, England. It is situated 2 miles west of Huddersfield town centre between Oakes, Paddock and Longwood.

== History ==
The holders of the manor in the reign of Edward the Confessor 1042–66 were Gamel and Godwin, but the landlord at the time of the Domesday Book was Ilbert de Lacy. The Lacy family in Normandy derived their name from the commune of Lassy, the Lacius or Latius estates in the county of Calvados. The village of Lassy today is near the town of Vire in France. The name, originally Cornbei, is said to have been given by de Lacy.

== Politics ==
Quarmby is part of the Huddersfield constituency for elections to the House of Commons of the United Kingdom, currently represented by Harpreet Uppal (Labour) since 2024.

== See also ==
- Listed buildings in Huddersfield (Lindley Ward)
