= Calderdale Royal Hospital =

NHS hospital in Yorkshire

- Calderdale and Huddersfield NHS Foundation Trust
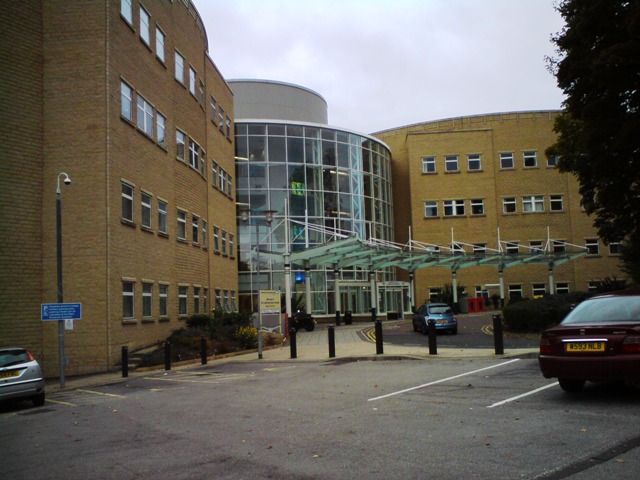

- Shown in West Yorkshire

Geography
- Location: Halifax, West Yorkshire, England
- Coordinates: 53.705°N 1.857°W

Organisation
- Care system: NHS

Services
- Emergency department: Yes

History
- Founded: 2001

Links
- Website: www.cht.nhs.uk/about-us/our-hospitals/calderdale-royal-hospital/
- Lists: Hospitals in England

The Calderdale Royal Hospital is a hospital situated in the English town of Halifax. It is located in the suburb of Salterhebble and provides general services, emergency services and some specialist services including coronary care and the Calderdale and Huddersfield area maternity unit. It is managed by Calderdale and Huddersfield NHS Foundation Trust.

== History ==
The hospital, which replaced the Royal Halifax Infirmary, was procured under a Private Finance Initiative contract in 1998. The new hospital was built by Bovis Lend Lease. The cost of building the hospital, originally budgeted at £34.8 million in 1994, was £103 million by 2001. It started providing services to patients in April 2001 and was officially opened by Princess Anne on 15 March 2004. Facilities management services are provided by ISS.

Proposals to close the Accident and Emergency Department in February 2016 provoked a demonstration of 5,000 people in Huddersfield and a petition signed by 60,000 people against it.

== See also ==
- List of hospitals in England
