= Calderdale and Huddersfield NHS Foundation Trust =

Healthcare trust in England

- Type: NHS foundation trust
- Established: 1 August 2006
- Hospitals: Huddersfield Royal Infirmary; Calderdale Royal Hospital
- Chair: Helen Hirst
- Chief executive: Brendan Brown
- Website: www.cht.nhs.uk

Calderdale and Huddersfield NHS Foundation Trust runs Huddersfield Royal Infirmary, Huddersfield and Calderdale Royal Hospital, Halifax, both in West Yorkshire, England. It became a Foundation Trust in August 2006.

== History ==
The rebuilding of Calderdale Royal Hospital by the Catalyst consortium which now services and maintains the hospital was a Private Finance Initiative costing £103 million.

There were suggestions in 2014 that the A&E Department in Calderdale Royal Hospital could be closed or downgraded. This was opposed by MPs in Halifax. Proposals envisaged one site, probably Huddersfield dealing with urgent cases, having an A&E Department, and more beds, with the other site, probably Halifax, dealing with planned work, and having fewer beds. In 2016 new plans to close the A&E Department in Huddersfield and centralise in Halifax aroused considerable opposition in Huddersfield. In 2017 more detailed plans were produced envisaging the demolition of Huddersfield Royal Infirmary and building a 64-bed planned care hospital nearby. These plans would be financed by private finance initiative funding.

In August 2018, it was announced the plans to close Huddersfield A&E department had been scrapped with a new Emergency department costing £15 million opening on 22 May 2024.

== Performance ==
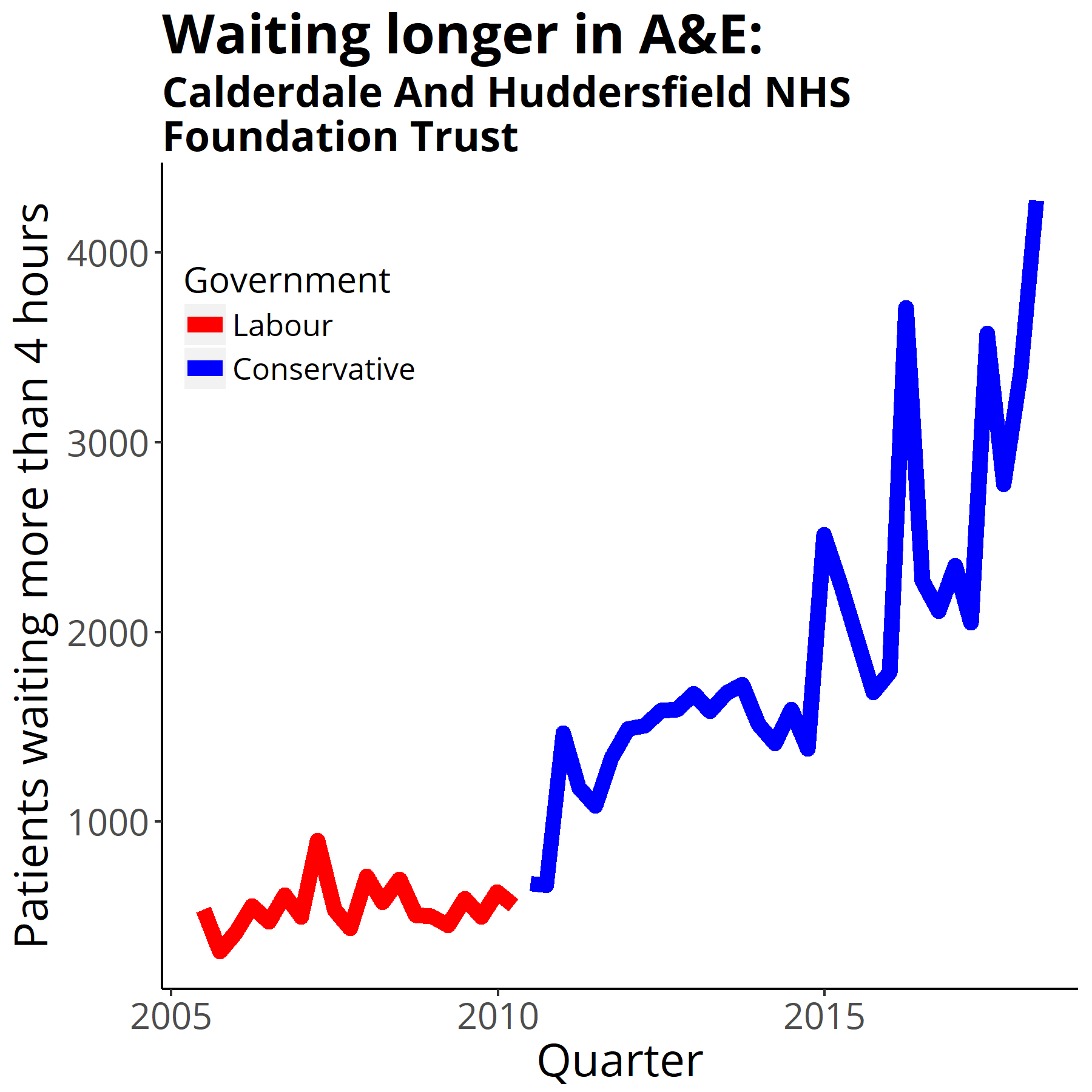
Four-hour target in the emergency department quarterly figures from NHS England Data from https://www.england.nhs.uk/statistics/statistical-work-areas/ae-waiting-times-and-activity/

In December 2013 it was revealed that the Trust had one of the worst figures for delayed discharges in England.

In 2014, the Trust planned to buy a new electronic patient record system and sent 14 members of staff to the US to evaluate the competing systems from Cerner and Allscripts, the final two competing for the £38 million contract shortlisted from eight bidders. A contract was due to be signed in early 2015 with the system implemented in mid-2016. The Trust were criticised by UNISON for sending staff on what was described as a junket, but the Trust said that 13 of the 14 were clinicians and that it was bound to visit all shortlisted suppliers to avoid potential legal repercussions.

In December 2014 the Trust reported a sudden deterioration in its financial position projecting a £4 million deficit at the end of the financial year, despite originally planning for a £3 million surplus.

In April 2015 the Trust lost a contract to manage school nurses in Calderdale in favour of Locala. In 2014 it lost a £4.5 million contract for wheelchair services to private firm Opcare and a contract for termination of pregnancy worth roughly £1 million to the women's charity Marie Stopes International.

== See also ==
- List of NHS trusts
