= The Dante Arms =

Pub in Middleham, North Yorkshire, England

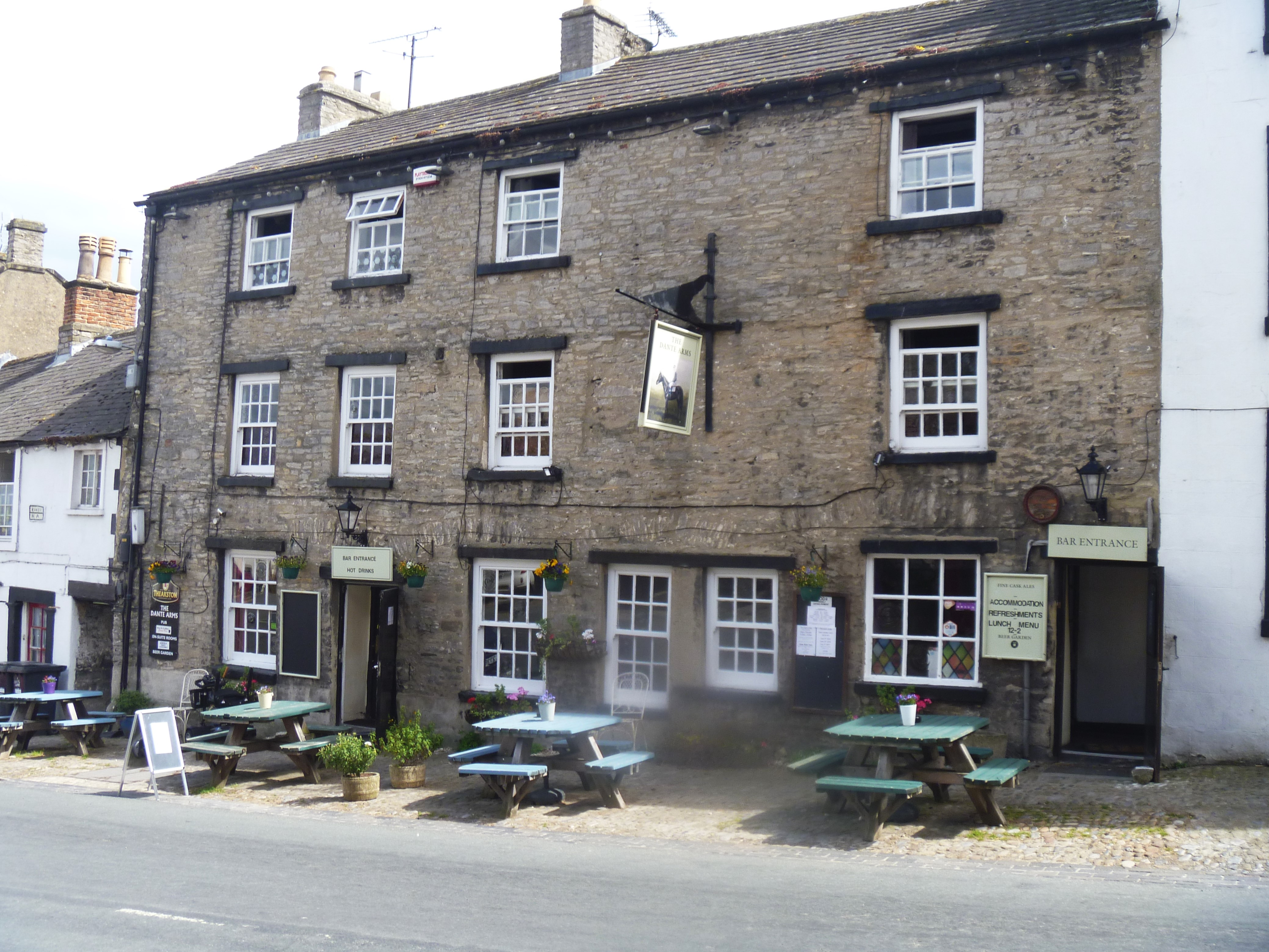
The pub, in 2022

The Dante Arms is a historic pub in Middleham, a town in North Yorkshire, in England.

The pub was constructed in the 19th century as a hotel. It was known as the Black Swan for many years, but was often confused with two other local pubs, The Black Bull and The White Swan. In 2018 it was renamed after Dante, a locally-trained racehorse, which was stabled behind the building. The pub was grade II listed in 1985.

The hotel is built of stone with a stone slate roof. It has three storeys and four bays. On the front are two doorways, and relieving arches of voussoirs over original openings. The windows are sashes.

== See also ==
- Listed buildings in Middleham
