= Middleham Market Cross =

Medieval market cross in Middleham, North Yorkshire, England

- Middleham Market Cross in the lower Market Place
- Interactive map of Middleham Market Cross
- 54.28530°N 1.80572°W
- Location: Market Place, Middleham, North Yorkshire, England
- Grid position: SE 12746 87756

History
- Built: Medieval (14th–15th century)

Site notes
- Architectural style: Medieval stone cross with modern wrought-iron finial
- Restored: Early 20th century

Listed Building – Grade II
- Designated: 15 February 1967
- Reference no.: 1318545

Scheduled monument
- Designated: 18 December 1946
- Reference no.: 1010548

Middleham Market Cross is a medieval market cross standing in the lower Market Place of Middleham, a market town in Wensleydale, North Yorkshire, England. Standing at the junction of the roads leading north, east, and west through the lower town, it is one of two surviving medieval crosses in Middleham, alongside the Swine Cross in the upper market square.

The structure is both a scheduled monument and a Grade II listed building, and is described by Historic England as "an impressive and well preserved example" of a market cross.

== History ==
Middleham's status as a market town dates to 1388–1389, when King Richard II granted Ralph Neville a royal charter to hold a weekly Monday market and an annual fair. A subsequent charter granted in 1479–1480 by Richard, Duke of Gloucester, later King Richard III, authorised two annual fairs and confirmed market tolls for the lordship of Middleham. Weekly Monday markets continued to be held in the town until the 1930s.

The cross in the lower Market Place was erected during the medieval period to mark the focal point of commercial trading and public proclamations. In the early 20th century (circa 1920), a new apex stone was added to the medieval shaft, topped by a newly forged Celtic cross. That Celtic cross-head was later removed and relocated for preservation inside the nearby Church of St Mary and St Alkelda, and a replacement wrought-iron cross was installed at the summit.

The monument was first designated as a scheduled monument on 18 December 1946, and was subsequently designated a Grade II listed building on 15 February 1967.

== Architecture ==
The market cross is constructed of local stone and stands approximately 2.1 metres (6.9 ft) high to the top of its stepped base. Its principal architectural components comprise:

- Stepped plinth: Four worn square stone steps, the lowest and largest measuring 3.5 metres (11 ft) square.
- Base and shaft: Resting atop the steps is a reused medieval hexagonal column capital serving as a socket base, supporting a 2 metres (6.6 ft) tall octagonal stone shaft finished with a moulded cornice.
- Finial: Surmounting the cornice is the 20th-century stone apex block carrying the wrought-iron cross.

== See also ==
- Listed buildings in Middleham
- Swine Cross
