= Swine Cross =

Structure in Middleham, North Yorkshire, England

Coordinates: 54°17′05″N 1°48′28″W

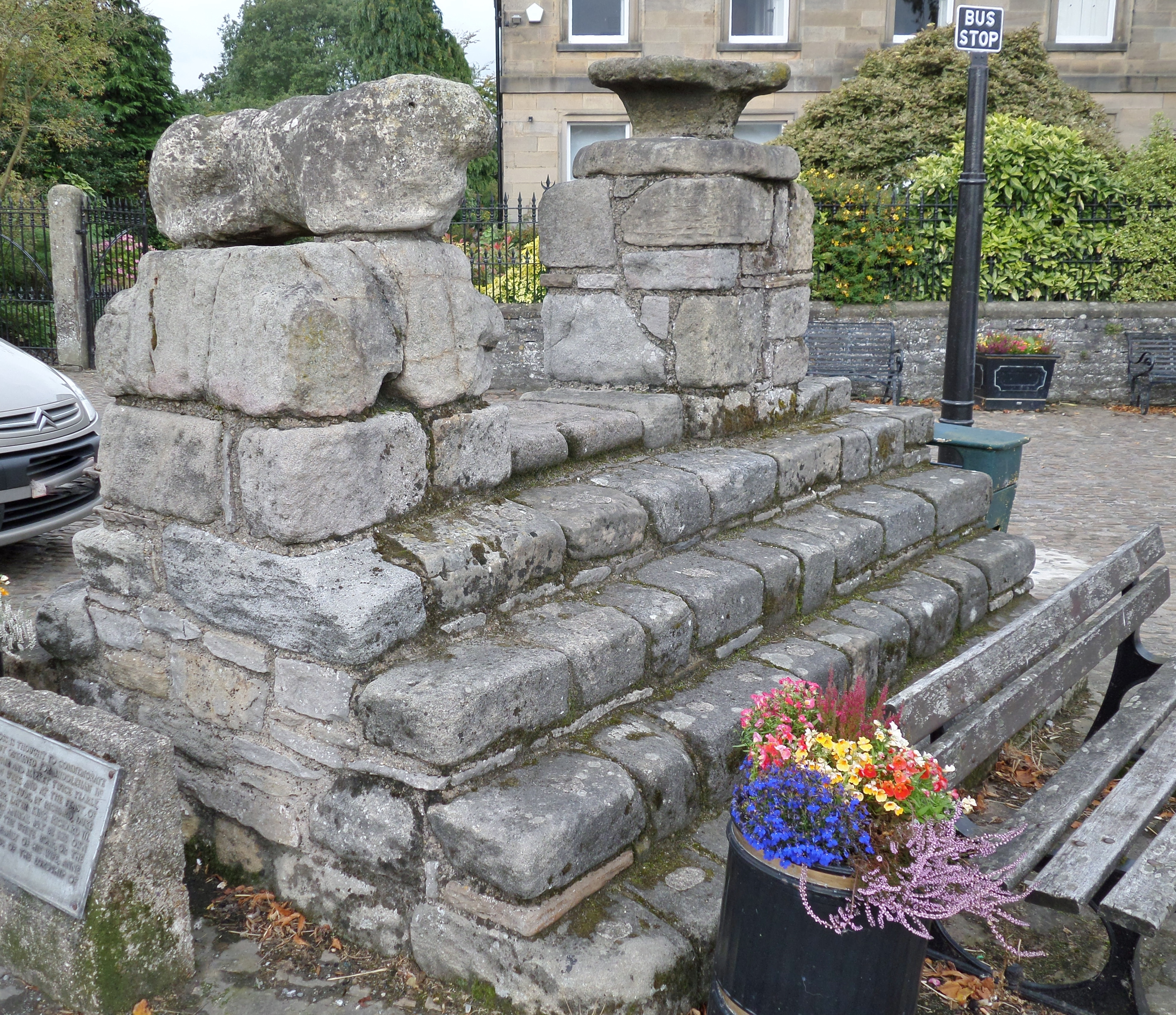
The structure, in 2013

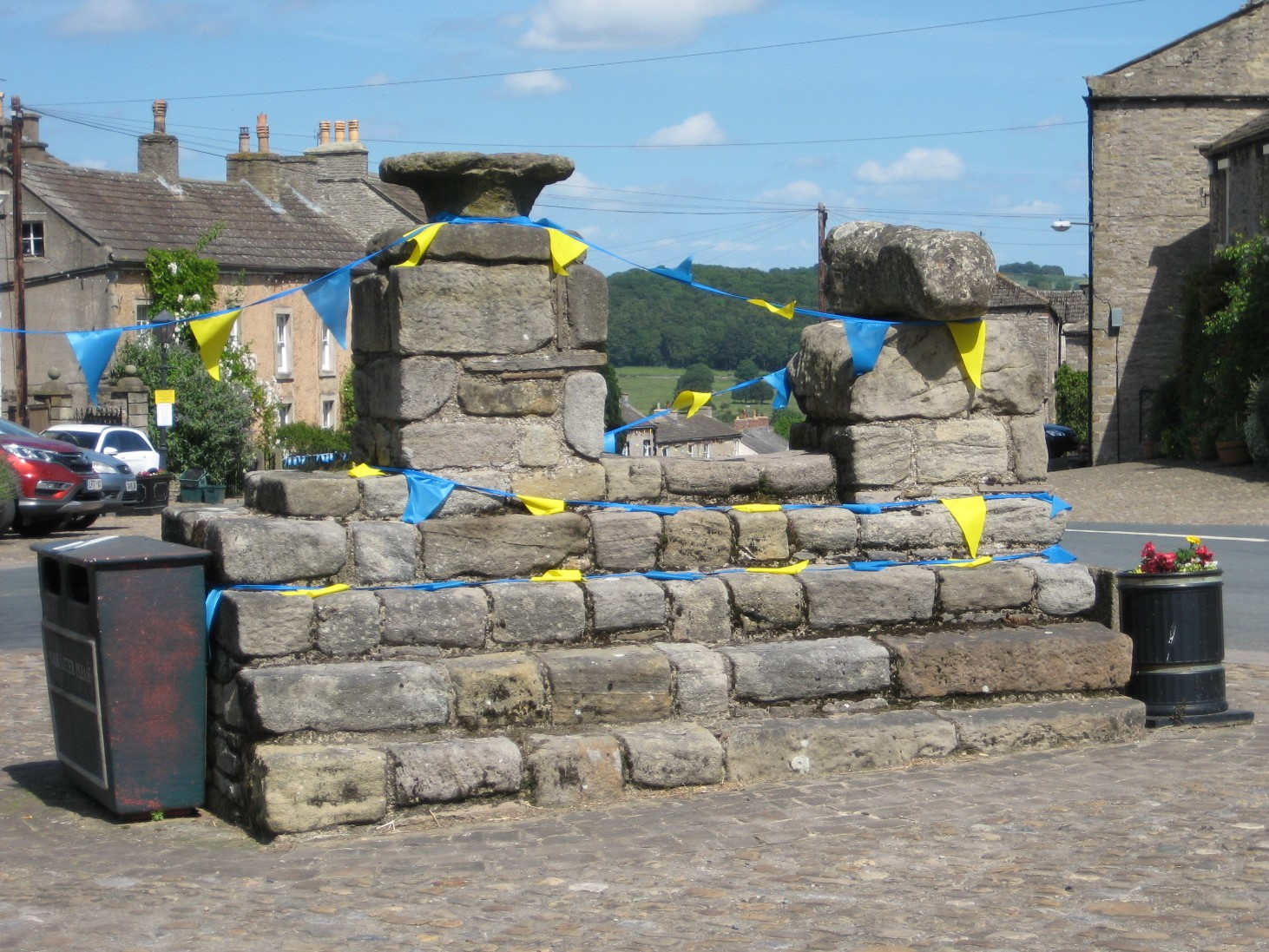
The structure, in 2019

Swine Cross is a historic structure in Middleham, a town in North Yorkshire, in England.

The market cross was constructed in the 15th century in Swine Market. It is believed that it was built to commemorate the award of a twice annual fair and market to the town by the future Richard III of England, in 1479. The cross was grade II listed in 1967, and is also a scheduled monument. The identity of the animal carved on the cross is unclear; it may be a swine, or a white boar, the emblem of the House of Neville, which owned Middleham Castle.

The base of the cross is rectangular, approached by a flight of steps at each end. On it are two pedestals, one with a medieval capital, and the other with a much-worn effigy of a recumbent animal.

== See also ==
- Listed buildings in Middleham
- Middleham Market Cross
