= Middleham Jewel =

Medieval, gold reliquary pendant found at Middleham and now in the Yorkshire Museum

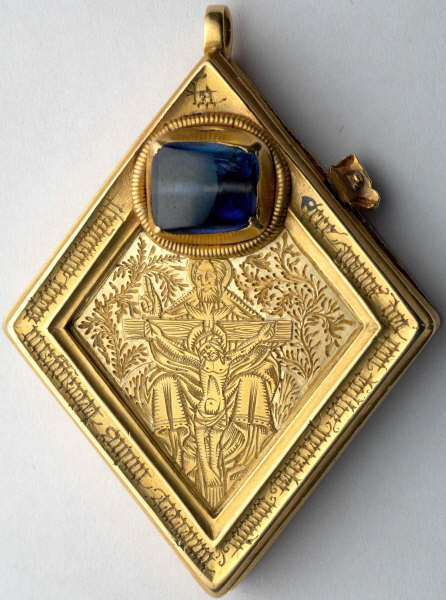
- The Middleham Jewel
- Material: Gold; Sapphire
- Created: late 15th Century
- Period/culture: Medieval
- Discovered: 1985; Middleham Castle, Middleham North Yorkshire
- Present location: Medieval Gallery, Yorkshire Museum, York
- Identification: YORYM: 1991.43

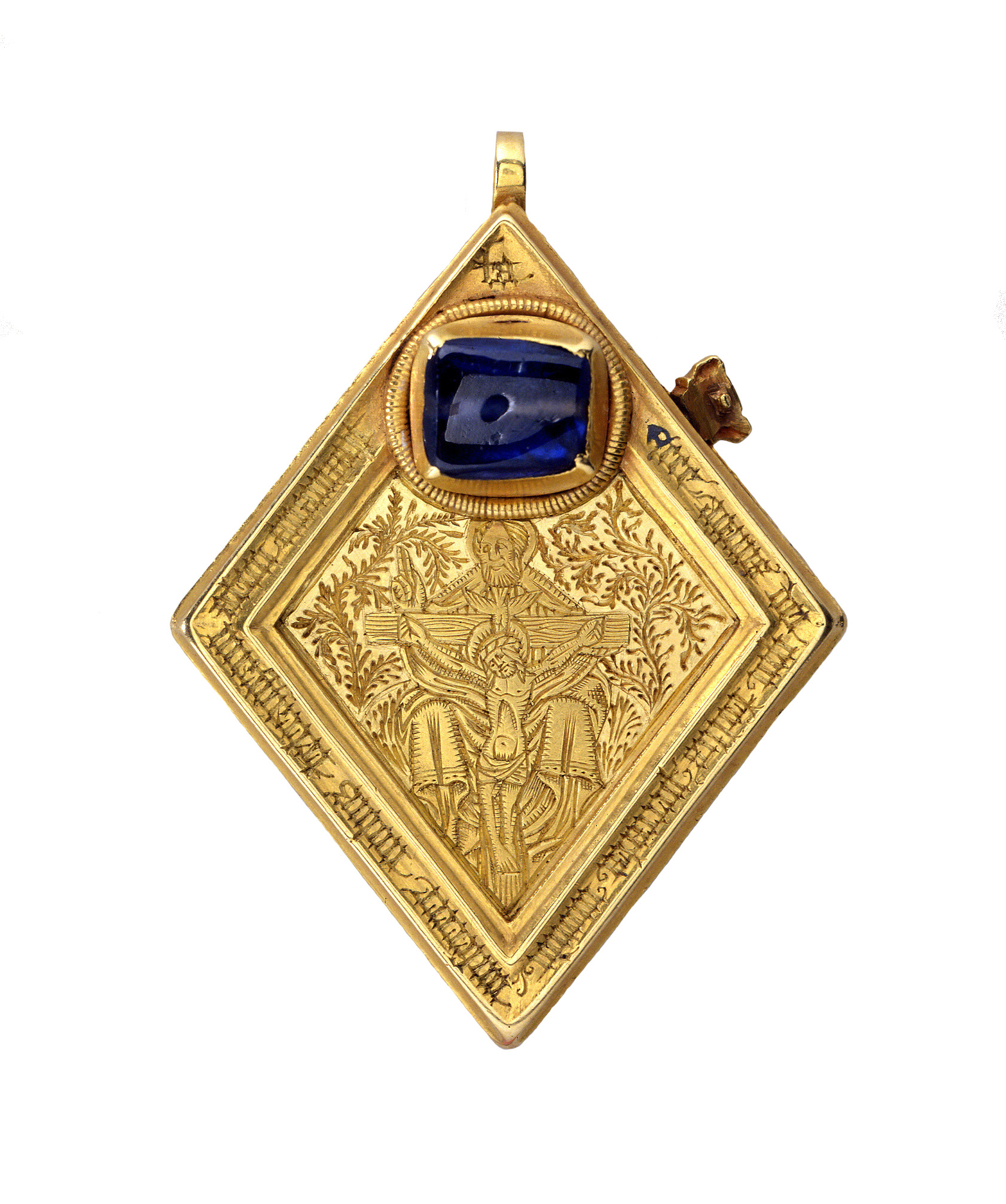
Front of the Middleham Jewel, showing the Trinity (high res).

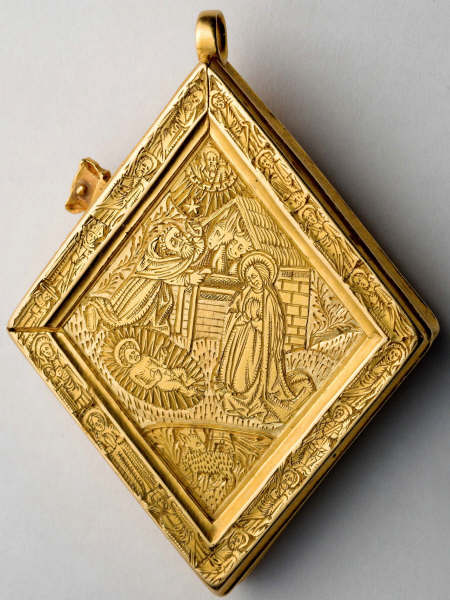
Reverse of the Middleham Jewel, showing the Nativity of Jesus.

The Middleham Jewel is a late 15th-century gold pendant, set with a large blue sapphire stone. Each side of the lozenge-shaped pendant is engraved with a religious scene. It was discovered by a metal detectorist in 1985 near Middleham Castle, the northern home of Richard III, and acquired by the Yorkshire Museum in York for £2.5 million.

== Description ==
The pendant is a 68 grams (2.4 oz) gold pendant with a 10 carats (2.0 g) blue sapphire stone set on one face. It measures approximately 6.4 centimetres (2.5 in) across.

The obverse bears a representation of the Trinity, including the Crucifixion of Jesus, bordered by a Latin inscription "Ecce Agnus Dei qui tollis peccata mundi ... miserere nobis ... tetragramaton ... Ananyzapta" (Translation: "Behold the Lamb of God, that takest away the sins of the world. Have mercy upon us..."), with “Ananyzapta” possibly a magic word intended to protect the user from epilepsy. The reverse bears an engraving of the Nativity, with the Lamb of God, bordered by the faces of fifteen saints, some bearing attributes that allow them to be identified as Saint Peter, Saint George, Saint Barbara, Saint Margaret of Antioch, Catherine of Alexandria, Dorothea of Caesarea and Saint Anne. Suggestions for the others include Saint Augustine of Hippo, Saint Nicholas of Myra, Saint Jerome, Anthony of Padua, Saint Agnes, Saint Cecilia, Saint Clare of Assisi and Saint Helena or Bridget of Sweden. The pendant may originally have been further decorated with enamelling on each face and pearls around the edge.

The back panel slides to reveal a hollow interior, which originally contained three and a half tiny discs of silk embroidered with gold thread. The textile contents identify the jewel as a reliquary, containing a fragment of holy cloth. It would have been worn by a high-status lady as the centrepiece for a large necklace. The sapphire may represent heaven and could have been an aid to prayer.

== Significance ==
A high-status item, it may have been owned by a relative of Richard III, possibly his wife, Anne Neville, his mother, Cecily Neville, or his mother-in-law, Anne Beauchamp (1426–92), widow of Warwick the Kingmaker. The blue colour of the sapphire (related to the Virgin Mary), the presence of several female saints and the depiction of the Nativity scene suggest that the jewel may have been intended to assist childbirth. The sapphire set above the Crucifixion may have been intended to have other magical or medicinal qualities as well, being able to cure ulcers, poor eyesight, headaches and stammers. The two words that follow the main Latin text—Tetragrammaton (the Latinised Hebrew name of God) and Ananizapta—may have been used as a charm against epilepsy.

== Discovery and acquisition ==
The jewel was found in 1985 on a bridle path near Middleham Castle by Ted Seaton using a metal detector. At a treasure trove inquiry it was declared lost or abandoned and sold at Sotheby's in 1986 for £1.4 million, but an export licence was temporarily refused to allow matching funds to be raised. It was acquired by the Yorkshire Museum in York in 1992 for £2.5 million, using funds raised by a public appeal, including £1.7 million from the National Heritage Memorial Fund, £350,000 from John Paul Getty Jr., £180,000 from the National Art Collections Fund, £75,000 from the Headley Trust, £60,000 from the Victoria and Albert Museum, £25,000 from the Goldsmith's Company and £20,000 from members of the public. There were also donations from North Yorkshire County Council, the Richard III Society and the Wolfson Foundation.

== Public display ==
The jewel forms part of the permanent collection of the Yorkshire Museum and has been included in many public exhibitions since its discovery. It first went on public display at the Yorkshire Museum in March 1991, while the export ban was in place but before it was acquired by the museum.

During the 2009–2010 closure of the Yorkshire Museum for a major refurbishment the pendant was displayed in the British Museum as part of the exhibition 'Treasures from Medieval York: England's other capital'. When the museum reopened in August 2010 it was displayed in the Medieval gallery in the exhibition 'Medieval York: The Power and the Glory'. From 2012 to 2013 it was displayed in the 'York 1212: The Making of a City' exhibition, celebrating 800 years since York had received a Royal charter. From March 2015 to January 2016 it featured in the exhibition 'Richard III: Man & Myth'. From 2017 it featured in the 'Medieval York: Capital of the North exhibition'.

A replica is on display at Middleham Castle.
