= Church of St Mary and St Alkelda, Middleham =

Coordinates: 54.2864°N 1.8075°W

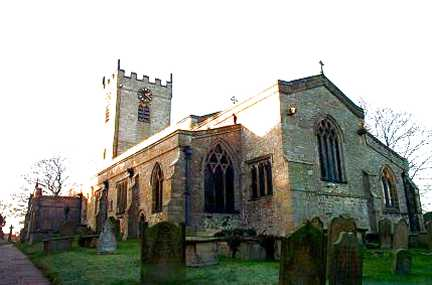
- Church of St Mary and St Alkelda, Middleham
- OS grid reference: SE 12632 87878
- Location: Church Street, Middleham, Leyburn, North Yorkshire, DL8 4PQ
- Country: England
- Denomination: Church of England
- Previous denomination: Roman Catholic Church

History
- Status: Active

Architecture
- Functional status: Parish church
- Years built: 13th century

Specifications
- Capacity: 200

Administration
- Diocese: Diocese of Leeds
- Archdeaconry: Archdeaconry of Richmond and Craven
- Parish: Middleham with Coverdale and East Witton and Thornton Steward

Clergy
- Rector: The Revd Jeffery Payne

The Church of St Mary and St Alkelda is a Church of England parish church in Middleham, Richmondshire, North Yorkshire. The church is a grade I listed building, and it dates from the 13th century.

== History ==
The church was made a collegiate church in 1477 by Richard, Duke of Gloucester (later Richard III). Richard III's young son and heir, Edward of Middleham, Prince of Wales, may possibly have been buried in the church after his death nearby in Middleham Castle in 1484. The collegiate body of the church consisted of a dean, six chaplains, four clerks and six choristers. The church was a Royal Peculiar until 1856, at which point the Dean was replaced by a Rector.

On 15 February 1967, the church was designated a Grade I listed building.

== Clock ==
The current clock with two faces and Cambridge Quarters was built by Potts of Leeds and set going August 1884.

== Present day ==
Today, the church is part of the benefice of "Middleham w Coverdale and E Witton and Thornton St" in the Archdeaconry of Richmond and Craven of the Diocese of Leeds.

The parish stands in the Conservative Evangelical tradition of the Church of England. The benefice has not passed resolutions rejecting the ordination of women.

== New Plaque & Leaflet For Edward of Middleham ==

To mark the 550th anniversary of the birth of Richard III’s son and heir, Edward of Middleham, a new plaque was unveiled in the church by Kingfinder Philippa Langley MBE. The unveiling took place on 8 September 2026. On this day in 1483, Edward of Middleham had been invested Prince of Wales in York. A leaflet about Edward of Middleham, Prince of Wales, and his probable burial in the church accompanies the plaque.

The Church of St Mary and St Alkelda offers prayers and a quiet place of solace and remembrance for all those suffering the loss of a child.

== Notable clergy ==
- Harry Topham, clergyman and cricketer, served as rector from 1903 to 1925

== See also ==
- Grade I listed buildings in North Yorkshire (district)
- Listed buildings in Middleham
