= Wensleydale Hotel =

Building in Middleham, North Yorkshire, England

Coordinates: 54°17′08″N 1°48′20″W

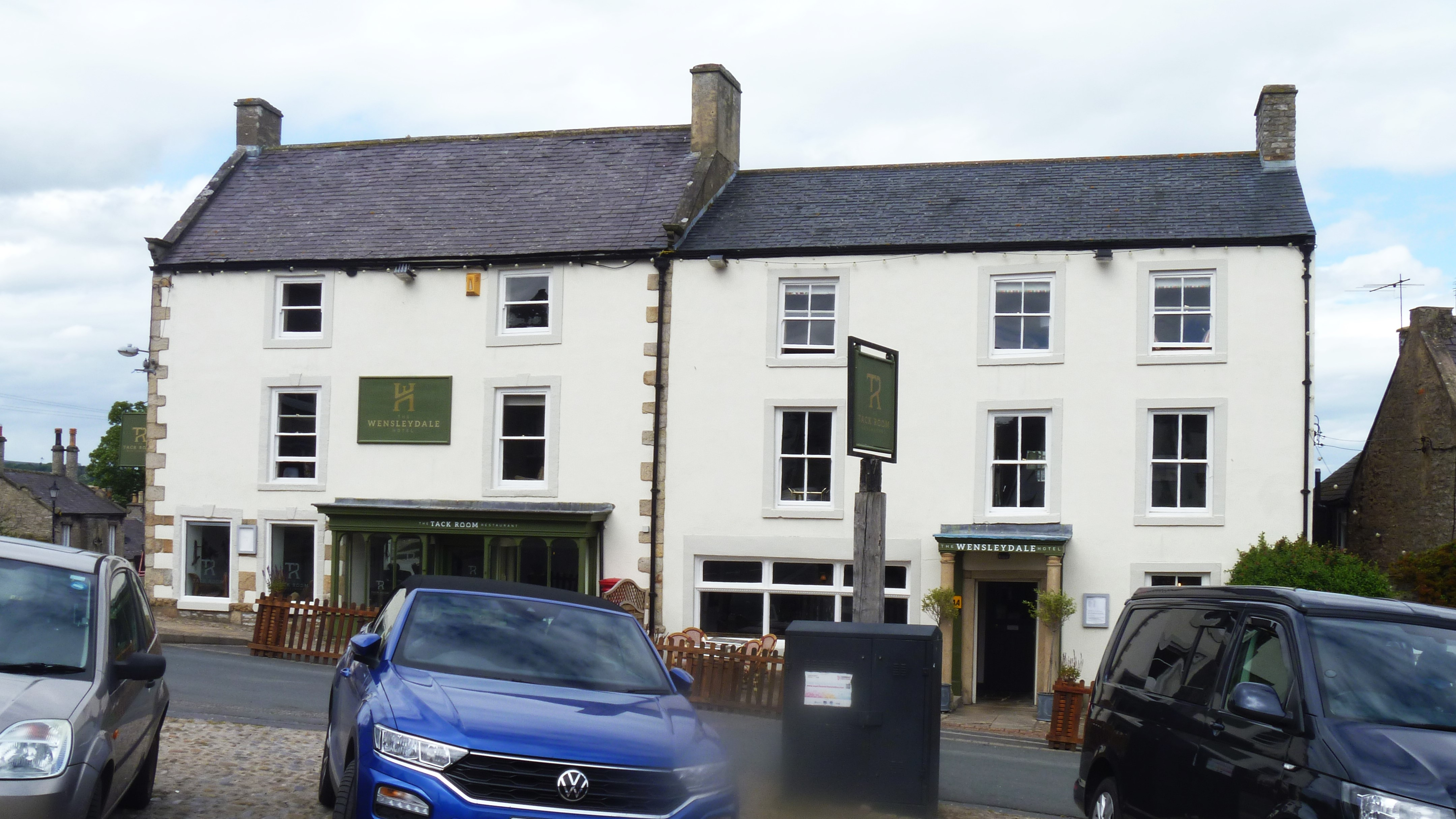
The building, in 2022

The Wensleydale Hotel is a historic building in Middleham, a town in North Yorkshire, in England.

The hotel was built around 1800 as an inn named The White Swan. The building was grade II listed in 1985. In 2019, new owners renamed it after Wensleydale, and created a restaurant, the Tack Room. In 2025 it was put for sale for £800,000, at which time it had 17 bedrooms, a restaurant, private dining room, and bar.

The hotel is rendered and has a stone slate roof. It has three storeys and is three bays wide. In the centre is a projecting Doric portico, and to its left is a 20th-century three-light window. The windows on the upper floors are sashes in stone surrounds.

== See also ==
- Listed buildings in Middleham
