= Listed buildings in Middleham =

Middleham is a civil parish in the county of North Yorkshire, England. It contains 60 listed buildings that are recorded in the National Heritage List for England. Of these, two are listed at Grade I, the highest of the three grades, and the others are at Grade II, the lowest grade. The parish contains the market town of Middleham and the surrounding area. Apart from a road bridge, all the listed buildings are in the village, the most important being Middleham Castle and the Church of St Mary and St Alkelda, both listed at Grade I. Most of the other listed buildings are houses, cottages and associated structures, and shops, and the rest include two market crosses, hotels and public houses, a school, a lamp standard, a fountain and a telephone kiosk.

== Key ==
Grade	Criteria
I	Buildings of exceptional interest, sometimes considered to be internationally important
II	Buildings of national importance and special interest

== Buildings ==
Name and location	Photograph	Date	Notes	Grade
Middleham Castle; 54.28405°N 1.80696°W		12th century	The castle has been extended and altered through the centuries, it is in stone, and is now in ruins. There is a large rectangular keep, still standing to its full height, that has been divided to form a hall and a great chamber, and it has a late 13th-century chapel annex. The castle is enclosed by curtain walls, containing irregularly-shaped angle towers and a round tower on the southwest. On the southeast is a 14th-century gatehouse with diagonal turrets, and machicolations above the segmental-arched opening.	I
Church of St Mary and St Alkelda; 54.28638°N 1.80751°W		14th century	The church has been altered and enlarged through the centuries. It is built in stone, and consists of a nave with a clerestory, north and south aisles, a south porch, a chancel and a west tower. The tower has three stages, diagonal buttresses, a south stair doorway with a chamfered surround and a pointed arch, a Perpendicular west window, vents, a small window with a trefoil head, two-light bell openings, clock faces, and an embattled parapet with corner finials. Above the south doorway is a 14th-century relief carving of the Crucifixion.	I
Market cross 54.28530°N 1.80572°W		Medieval	The market cross in Market Place is in stone. It has four square steps, on which is a hexagonal column capital acting as a base. On this is an octagonal column with a cornice, surmounted by a 20th-century apex stone and a wrought iron cross.	II
Swine Cross; 54.28462°N 1.80787°W		15th century	The base of a stone market cross with a stepped base. On it are two pedestals, one with a medieval capital, and the other with a much-worn effigy of a recumbent animal.	II
Laundry House; 54.28397°N 1.80791°W		16th to mid-17th century (or earlier)	The house is in stone, with quoins, and a Welsh slate roof with a coped gable. There are two storeys and one bay, with the gable end facing the street. On the left is a doorway, and the windows are sashes.	II
Kingsley House; 54.28653°N 1.80641°W	—	17th century (probable)	The house, at one time a rectory, is in stone, partly rendered, with stone slate roofs, shaped kneelers and stone copings. There are two storeys and three ranges. In the south front is a doorway with a pointed arch and a chamfered moulded surround. The eastern range has a plinth, quoins, a doorway with a moulded surround on plinths, a pulvinated frieze and a pediment, and above is a dentilled cornice and a hipped roof. On the north side are canted bay windows, and in all parts there are sash windows.	II
Stable Door Teashop and Golden Lion Cottage; 54.28503°N 1.80588°W		1682	An inn, later converted for other uses, it is rendered and has a Welsh slate roof. There are two storeys and three bays. On the ground floor are two segmental bow windows with a doorway between. To the right is another doorway with a stone surround on plinths, a moulded arris, and curved inner corners to the lintel, and further to the right is a yard door. The upper floor contains sash windows, one horizontally-sliding, and a dated plaque.	II
Warwick Cottage and Moat Cottage; 54.28403°N 1.80783°W		1719	A pair of stone houses with a stone slate roof, shaped kneelers and stone copings. There are three storeys and two bays. In the centre are two doorways with chamfered surrounds under a relieving arch of voussoirs, and the windows are mullioned.	II
Pear Tree House; 54.28543°N 1.80624°W	—	Early 18th century	The house is in stone, with gutter brackets, and a Welsh slate roof with a shaped kneeler and stone coping on the left. There are two storeys and three bays. In the centre is a doorway with a moulded eared surround and a fanlight, and to its right is a square bay window. The left bay contains a casement window with a chamfered surround in each floor, and the other windows on the front are sashes with keystones. In the return gables are mullioned windows.	II
Clarendon House and railings 54.28510°N 1.80503°W		Mid-18th century	The house is rendered, and has stone dressings, a moulded sill band, and a stone slate roof with shaped kneelers and stone coping. There are three storeys and three bays. In the centre is a doorway with a moulded eared surround, a moulded frieze and a pediment. This is flanked by canted bay windows with lead roofs, and the other windows are sashes in moulded surrounds. To the left is a two-storey, single-bay extension with a hipped roof. In front of the house is a low wall with wrought iron railings, and a gate flanked by stone gate piers.	II
Hill House East, gate piers and railings 54.28494°N 1.80703°W		Mid-18th century	The house is in stone and has a stone slate roof. There are two storeys, three bays, and a rear wing. In the right bay is a doorway with Tuscan pilasters, an entablature, and a decorative fanlight, and the windows are sashes. In front of the house is a low stone wall with saddleback coping, and cast iron railings with fleurs-de-lis and urn finials. To the right is a pair of rusticated stone gate piers, each on a plinth, with a cornice and a depressed pyramidal cap.	II
Hill House West and railings 54.28495°N 1.80716°W		Mid-18th century	The house is roughcast, with stone dressings, quoins, and a stone slate roof with coping on the left. There are two storeys, a double depth plan, and three bays. The central doorway has a moulded, eared and shouldered surround, and a decorative fanlight. The windows are sashes with moulded, eared and shouldered surrounds. In front of the house is a stone plinth with saddleback coping, stone gate piers, and cast iron railings with fleurs-de-lis and urn finials.	II
Kent House; 54.28547°N 1.80516°W		Mid-18th century	The house is in stone, with rusticated quoins, and a stone slate roof with shaped kneelers and stone copings. There are three storeys and three bays. The central doorway has a moulded eared surround on plinths, a pulvinated frieze and a cornice. This is flanked by square bay windows with casements, and the other windows are sashes with plain stone surrounds.	II
Manor House Stables; 54.28352°N 1.80752°W		18th century	The stable block is in stone, with quoins, a cornice on modillions, and a stone slate roof with shaped kneelers and stone coping. There are two storeys and four bays. On the ground floor are four stable doors with impost blocks, and basket soffits to the lintels, and eight horizontally-sliding sash windows. The upper floor contains doorways, square windows, and a loading step on corbels.	II
Middleham House; 54.28614°N 1.80720°W	—	18th century	The house, which was later extended, is in stone, with rusticated quoins, and a stone slate roof with a shaped kneeler and stone coping on the left. There is a complex plan, with a main part of three storeys and five bays. In the centre is a sandstone portico with two Greek Doric columns in antis. The windows are sashes, some with moulded surrounds. To the left is a slightly projecting later two-storey range with a hipped roof, containing a Venetian window in each floor, with inner Doric columns.	II
Former Post Office; 54.28556°N 1.80566°W		Mid-18th century	The post office, later used for other purposes, is in stone, with quoins and a Welsh slate roof with shaped kneelers and stone copings. There are three storeys and two bays. On the ground floor are two shop bay windows flanking a doorway under a fascia. To the left are two windows with quoined surrounds and keystones. The upper floors contain sash windows with keystones.	II
Rosemount; 54.28549°N 1.80496°W		18th century	The house is in stone, with rusticated quoins, and an artificial slate roof with shaped kneelers and stone copings. There are two storeys and three bays. On the left is a round-arched entrance on plinths, with imposts and a keystone. To its right is a casement window, and a doorway with a stone surround on plinths with a fanlight. Further to the right, and on the upper floor, are sash windows.	II
The Black Bull; 54.28536°N 1.80475°W		Mid-18th century	The public house, on a corner site, is in painted brick, with quoins and a hipped stone slate roof. There are two storeys and an attic, and a front of two bays. On the front is an inserted doorway, and the original doorway in the left return is blocked. The windows are sashes.	II
The Manse, Flat and Cottage; 54.28372°N 1.80821°W		18th century	The house and the adjacent cottage and flat are in stone with a stone slate roof, and have three storeys. The house, on the left, has three bays. The central doorway has a sandstone surround, and is flanked by canted bay windows. On the upper floors are sash windows, those on the top floor horizontally-sliding. The cottage and flat have two bays. On the ground floor are two doorways, and the windows are a mix of casements and sashes, some horizontally-sliding.	II
The Priory, railings and gates 54.28487°N 1.80760°W		Mid-18th century	The house is in stone, with sill bands, a moulded cornice, and a stone slate roof with shaped kneelers and stone coping. There are three storeys and five bays. On the front is a doorway with a moulded architrave, a fanlight and a keystone, flanked by canted bay windows with lead roofs. In the right bay is a segmental carriage arch with a keystone, containing wrought iron gates with a guilloché motif and arrow finials. The upper floors contain sash windows with keystones. In front of the house is a stone plinth with wrought iron railings, the standards with urn finials.	II
Former premises of the Wensleydale Advertiser; 54.28540°N 1.80606°W	—	Mid-18th century	The building is in brick, with string courses, dentilled eaves, and a Welsh slate roof with shaped kneelers and stone copings. There are three storeys and three bays. In the front is a doorway flanked by shop windows, the one on the right larger. The upper floors contain sash windows in plain surrounds.	II
Three houses and screen wall, Market Place (south); 54.28509°N 1.80524°W		Mid to late 18th century	The houses are rendered, and have a stone slate roof with a shaped kneele and stone coping on the left. There are three storeys and three bays. On the ground floor are paired doorways with quoined surrounds and keystones, and to the right is a bow window with Tuscan pilasters and a fascia. The other windows are casements in the right bay, and sashes elsewhere. On the left is a screen wall containing a segmental-arched doorway with a quoined surround, and a blind round-head opening above.	II
Warwick House; 54.28615°N 1.80573°W	—	1769	The house is in stone, and has a Welsh slate roof with shaped kneelers, stone coping and a terracotta ridge crest. There are three storeys and three bays. In the centre is a round-arched doorway with imposts, a radial fanlight with decorative glazing bars, and a fluted keystone. It is flanked by caned bay windows with ogee lead roofs, and the upper floors contain sash windows.	II
Jasmine House, Ferndale House and railings 54.28524°N 1.80473°W		1772	A house and a cottage to the right in stone. The house has rusticated quoins, a modillion cornice, and a stone slate roof with stone copings. There are three storeys and five bays. The central doorway has a moulded, eared and shouldered surround, a pulvinated frieze, a modillion cornice and a pediment. The cottage has a coped Welsh slate roof, a gabled front, two storeys and one bay. In the centre is a wrought iron porch, and a doorway with a plain surround and a keystone. The windows in both parts are sashes. In front is a stone plinth, and wrought iron railings and gates with urn finials on the standards.	II
Castle Hill House West; 54.28453°N 1.80535°W	—	Late 18th century	The house is rendered, and has quoins, wooden gutter brackets, and a stone slate roof with a shaped kneeler and stone coping on the left. There are two storeys and an attic, and three bays. The right bay is a full height bow with a string course below a parapet, and contains a central doorway flanked by two windows, and three windows above, all with moulded surrounds. The other bays contain sash windows, and in the attic is a range of dormers. The entrance is in the left return and has a distyle portico with fluted Doric half-columns, and a doorway with Tuscan pilasters.	II
Gates and gate piers, Kingsley House; 54.28636°N 1.80601°W	—	Late 18th century	The gates are in wrought iron, and have pointed finials. They are flanked by rusticated rock-faced gate piers with pilasters. Each pier has a cornice and a torus cap, and here are side piers with a similar design.	II
Former Pickersgill, Butcher; 54.28504°N 1.80572°W		Late 18th century	The house and shop are rendered, with paired modillion gutter brackets, and a Welsh slate roof with a shaped kneeler and stone coping on the right. There are three storeys and two bays. In the centre is a doorway with a stone surround on plinths, with imposts. This is flanked by square shop bay windows, and to the left is a yard doorway with a plain surround. The upper floors contain sash windows.	II
The Richard the Third Hotel; 54.28504°N 1.80556°W		Late 18th century	The hotel is in stone, with rusticated quoins, and a stone slate roof with shaped kneelers and stone coping. There are three storeys and four bays. In the left bay is a round-arched opening with quoined jambs, impost blocks and a keystone. To the right is a doorway with a moulded eared surround on plinths, a frieze and a cornice. The flanking windows and those on the upper two floors are sashes with plain stone surrounds.	II
Manor House and railings 54.28383°N 1.80805°W		1777	The house, which was later extended to the right, is in stone, with rusticated quoins, and a stone slate roof with shaped kneelers and stone copings, and two storeys. The original part to the left has three bays, a plinth and a moulded cornice, and it contains sash windows. The later part has two bays, and to the left is a round-arched doorway with impost blocks, and a tripartite keystone. To its right is a narrow window and above is a sash window. On the ground floor of the right bay is a Venetian window, above it is a tripartite window, and on the top floor is a Diocletian window. In front of the house are wrought iron railings with urn finials on the standards.	II
Sundial House; 54.28490°N 1.80741°W		1778	The house is rendered, with stone dressings, rusticated quoins, sill bands, and a Welsh slate roof with shaped kneelers and stone coping on the right. There are two storeys and three bays. In the centre is a doorway with a moulded eared surround on plinths. Above the doorway is a plaque containing an inscribed and dated sundial, and the windows are sashes in stone surrounds. On the roof are two gabled dormers.	II
Castle House; 54.28480°N 1.80636°W		Late 18th to early 19th century	The house is in stone, and has a stone slate roof with shaped kneelers and stone coping. There are two storeys and three bays. The central doorway has a moulded surround, a plain frieze and a moulded cornice. To its left is a blocked doorway with a plain surround, and the windows are sashes.	II
The former White Swan; 54.28554°N 1.80551°W		Late 18th to early 19th century	The hotel is rendered and has a stone slate roof. There are three storeys and three bays. In the centre is a projecting Doric portico, and to its left is a 20th-century three-light window. The windows on the upper floors are sashes in stone surrounds.	II
Black Swan Inn; 54.28500°N 1.80603°W		Early 19th century	The hotel is in stone with a stone slate roof. There are three storeys and four bays. On the front are two doorways, and relieving arches of voussoirs over original openings. The windows are sashes.	II
Coach house, Castle Hill House; 54.28450°N 1.80575°W	—	Early 19th century	The coach house is in stone, with quoins, and a stone slate roof with shaped kneelers and stone coping. There are two storeys, the gable end faces the street and has two bays, and on the sides are four .bays. The gable end contains a segmental arched opening with a keystone.	II
Gates and gate piers, Castle Hill House; 54.28458°N 1.80572°W	—	Early 19th century	The gates are in wrought and cast iron with fleur-de-lis finials, and have standards with urn finials. The piers are in rusticated stone, on plinths, and with cornices.	II
Carlton House; 54.28600°N 1.80550°W	—	Early 19th century	The house is in brick, with stone quoins, a moulded eaves cornice, and a stone slate roof with shaped kneelers and stone coping. There are two storeys and a basement, and three bays. In the centre, a flight of stone steps leads up to a ground floor doorway with a plain surround. This is flanked by basement windows with segmental arches and impost bands, and the other windows are sashes.	II
Castle Hotel and Foxtor House; 54.28494°N 1.80625°W		Early 19th century	The building is in stone, the left four bays rendered, with paired modillion gutter brackets, and a tile roof with a shaped kneeler and stone coping on the left. There are three storeys, five bays, the left bay recessed and the right bay projecting with a rounded front, and a rear two-storey block. In the centre is a doorway with a stone surround on plinths and a keystone, and there is a similar doorway in the left bay. To the left of the central doorway is a square bay window, and the other windows are sashes.	II
Castle Keep Art and Craft Shop; 54.28471°N 1.80661°W		Early 19th century	The house and shop are rendered, on a plinth, with rusticated quoins, and a stone slate roof with shaped kneelers. There are two storeys and two bays. In the centre are two doorways with plain surrounds, the right doorway with a keystone. To the right is a shop window, and the other windows are sashes with plain surrounds.	II
Desmond House; 54.28471°N 1.80695°W		Early 19th century	Two houses and a shop in stone, with a stone slate roof and a shaped kneeler and stone coping on the left. Thee are three storeys and three bays. On the front are three doorways, the left two paired, with plain surrounds on plinths, and to the right is a 19th-century shop window. The other windows are sashes.	II
Glasgow House and gate piers 54.28498°N 1.80677°W		Early 19th century	The house is in stone, with sandstone dressings, rusticated quoins, and a stone slate roof with shaped kneelers and stone coping. There are three storeys and three bays, and a rear outshut. On the front are sash windows, and a doorway converted into a window. The entrance is in the outshut, and consists of a round-arched doorway with a fanlight, imposts, and a fluted keystone. Adjacent to the doorway is an inscribed stone. To the left of the house is a pair of rusticated stone gate piers on plinths, with cornices and ball finials.	II
Hall gate piers 54.28347°N 1.80906°W		Early 19th century	The gate piers flanking the entrance are in rusticated sandstone, and are about 2 metres (6 ft 7 in) tall. Each pier has a plain plinth, a plain cornice, and a conical cap on an urn base.	II
Millers House; 54.28539°N 1.80654°W		Early 19th century	The house, later used for other purposes, is in stone, with rusticated quoins, a moulded cornice with a blocking course forming a parapet, and a hipped Westmorland slate roof. There are two storeys and three bays, and a rear wing. In the centre is a doorway with panelled pilasters, a fanlight, a frieze, a moulded cornice and a blocking course, and the windows are sashes in plain surrounds.	II
Milton House and railings 54.28472°N 1.80677°W		Early 19th century	The house is in stone, with rusticated quoins, and a stone slate roof with a shaped kneeler and stone coping on the left. There are two storeys, and the main part has three bays. In the centre is a doorway with pilasters, a decorative fanlight, a frieze, a cornice and a blocking course. It is flanked by two-storey segmental bow windows, and the upper floor contains sash windows with a sill band, above which is a string course, a moulded cornice and a parapet. To the left is a recessed bay containing a narrow segmental carriage arch of voussoirs with a keystone, and above it is a sash window. In front of the house is a low rusticated wall with cast iron railings.	II
Peacocks Cottages East; 54.28346°N 1.80856°W		Early 19th century	A row of three stone cottages with a stone slate roof, shaped kneelers and stone copings. There are two storeys and each cottage has two bays. The three doorways have stone surrounds on plinths, and the windows are sashes.	II
Peacocks Cottages West; 54.28341°N 1.80877°W		Early 19th century	Three, later two, cottages in stone, with a stone slate roof, and a shaped kneeler and stone coping on the left. There are two storeys and three bays. The two doorways have stone surrounds on plinths, and the windows are sashes. The right gable is carried up as a screen wall with an embattled parapet.	II
Gates and gateway to The Grove; 54.28507°N 1.80476°W	—	Early 19th century	The gateway is in stone, with quoins, a string course and a cornice. In the centre is a segmental arch with rusticated quoins and an archivolt. This is flanked by doorways with plain surrounds, the right one blocked, above which are stone plaques. The gates are in wrought iron, and are plain, with a lamp bracket above.	II
The former Nosebag; 54.28510°N 1.80534°W		Early 19th century	A house and shop in rendered stone, with rusticated quoins, gutter brackets, and a Welsh slate roof with a shaped kneeler and stone coping on the left. On the ground floor is a doorway flanked by square shop bay windows, and the upper floors contain sash windows in plain surrounds.	II
Waterford House; 54.28566°N 1.80603°W	—	Early 19th century	The house is in stone, and has a stone slate roof with a shaped kneeler and stone coping on the right. There are three storeys and three bays, the left bay projecting, with quoins. In the left bay is a canted bay window, the middle bay contains a doorway with engaged Doric columns, and to its right is a canted bay window. The upper floors contain sash windows in moulded surrounds.	II
West Shaw and outbuilding 54.28364°N 1.80898°W		Early 19th century	The house and outbuilding are in stone, and have stone slate roofs with shaped kneelers and stone coping. The house has quoins, two storeys and three bays. In the centre is a doorway with a stone surround on plinths, and the windows are sashes. To the right is a single-storey outbuilding containing two garage doors.	II
Middleham Bridge; 54.29431°N 1.81865°W		1830	The bridge carries the A6108 road over the River Ure. Originally a suspension bridge designed by Hansom and Welch, it was converted into a road deck bridge in 1865. At each end of the bridge is a pair of stone pylons with a rectangular plan, buttresses, and embattled parapets on corbels. They are joined by a four-centred arch carrying a stone wall, each with shield and panels, some with inscriptions. The bridge deck is in cast and wrought iron, on two cast iron columns into the river bed, with wrought iron parapets and inscribed panels.	II
1–3 Castle Hill; 54.28467°N 1.80711°W		Early to mid-19th century	A row of three houses in stone, with a stone slate roof and a shaped kneeler and stone coping on the right. There are three storeys and each house has one bay. Each bay contains a doorway on the left with a stone surround on plinths. On the ground floor of the right bay is a shop window, the middle bay has a casement window, and all the other windows are sashes.	II
Brief House; 54.28594°N 1.80601°W	—	Early to mid-19th century	The house is in stone, with a string course, and a Welsh slate roof with stone copings in the form of Dutch gables. There are two storeys and three bays. The middle bay projects slightly, and contains a doorway with a plain surround, a studded door and a cornice, and above it is a square stone panel containing a raised motif. The windows are casements with Gothic glazing.	II
Glasgow Cottage; 54.28505°N 1.80663°W		Mid-19th century	The house is in stone, with rusticated quoins on the right, and a stone slate roof with a shaped kneeler and stone coping on the right. There are two storeys and two bays. On the ground floor is a doorway and a three-light window to the right, and the upper floor contains a sash windows.	II
Gates, gate posts and railings, Millers House; 54.28537°N 1.80629°W	—	19th century	The pedestrian and carriage drive gates, railings and square gate posts, are all in cast iron and all have spear finials.	II
Neville Hall; 54.28466°N 1.80830°W		Mid-19th century	The house is in sandstone on a plinth, with a string course, a cornice, a parapet, and a hipped Westmorland slate roof. There are two storeys and five bays. In the centre is a distyle Doric portico, and a doorway with a decorative fanlight and a moulded architrave. The windows are sashes in moulded architraves.	II
Central Stores and awning 54.28507°N 1.80645°W		Mid to late 19th century	A house and a shop in stone, with quoins, and a stone slate roof with a shaped kneeler and stone coping on the right. There are two storeys and three bays. On the ground floor is a central doorway flanked by cast iron shop windows, each with four round-headed lights, and to the right is another doorway. The upper floor contains sash windows. In front there is a glazed cast iron awning on four fluted columns with tulip capitals supporting a fascia with Art Nouveau decoration, surmounted by cresting.	II
Old School and railings 54.28487°N 1.80787°W		1869	The school is in stone, with quoins, and a Welsh slate roof with stone copings and kneelers. There is a central four-stage tower, flanked by two-storey three-bay wings. The central bay of each wing has a quoined gable, on the ground floor are casement windows, and the windows on the upper floor have pointed heads. The tower has lancet windows, in the second stage is an inscribed plaque, and it is surmounted by an embattled parapet and a bellcote.. The right return of the tower contains a doorway with a stone surround on plinths, cornice capitals, and a four-centred arched head. In front of the school are cast iron railings on a stone plinth, with spear and urn finials.	II
Lamp standard 54.28533°N 1.80550°W		Late 19th century	The lamp standard in Market Place, originally gas, later electric, is in cast iron. It has a square base decorated with a garland and an inscription, on which is a hexagonal column with a lamp base and a ladder rest.	II
Victoria Jubilee Fountain; 54.28473°N 1.80769°W		1887	The fountain is in stone, and has a basin with a quatrefoil plan. The basin contains a square pedestal with a round-arched niche on each side, with inscriptions relating to the life of Queen Victoria. Above it is a dish with acanthus leaves and lions' heads, and a smaller dish with entwined dolphins.	II
Telephone kiosk 54.28516°N 1.80616°W		1935	The K6 type telephone kiosk outside the Town Hall was designed by Giles Gilbert Scott. Constructed in cast iron, it has a square plan and a dome, and there are three unperforated crowns in the top panels.	II
