= The Black Bull, Middleham =

Pub in Middleham, North Yorkshire, England

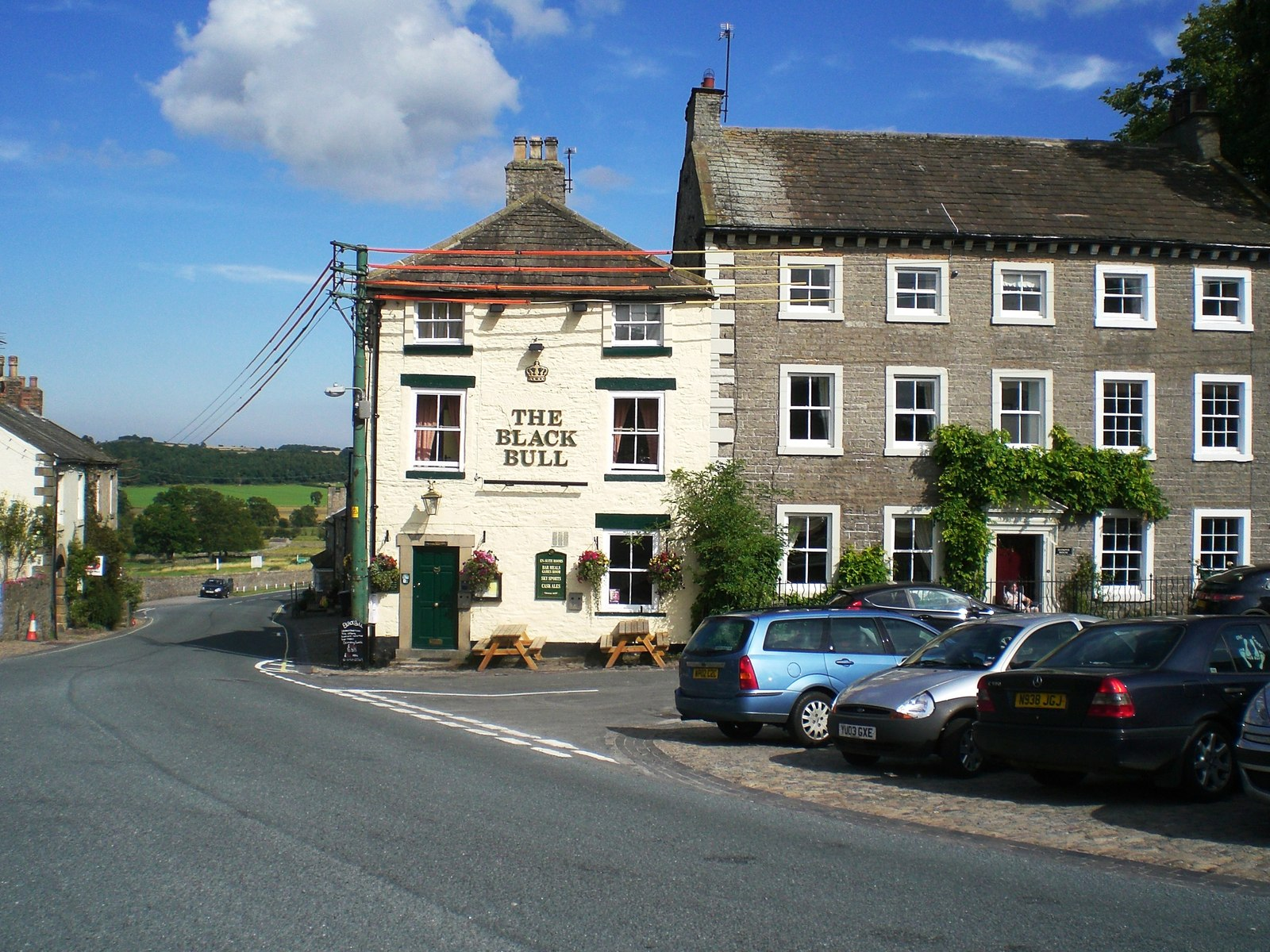
The pub, in 2010

The Black Bull is a historic pub in Middleham, a town in North Yorkshire, in England.

The pub was built in the mid 18th century. It was grade II listed in 1985. In 2024, it was put up for sale for £300,000. At the time, on the ground floor it had a main bar with a servery, fireplace, wooden ceiling beams and floor of stone flags; a snug with an inglenook fireplace; a further room and toilets. It also had a cellar, and on the upper floor a kitchen and flat.

The pub is built of painted rubble, with quoins and a hipped stone slate roof. It has two storeys and an attic, and a front of two bays. On the front is an inserted doorway, and the original doorway in the left return is blocked. The windows are sashes.

== See also ==
- Listed buildings in Middleham
