= Edward of Middleham, Prince of Wales =

Heir apparent of Richard III of England (c. 1476–1484)

Edward of Middleham
- Prince of Wales, Earl of Chester, Duke of Cornwall and Earl of Salisbury
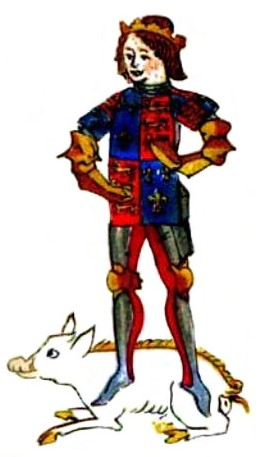
- Edward of Middleham with the White Boar of King Richard III. Illustration from the contemporary Rous Roll
- Born: c. December 1473 or 1476; Middleham, Wensleydale, England
- Died: 9 April 1484 (aged 7–10); Middleham, Wensleydale, England
Names
- English: Edward of Middleham; Welsh: Edward o Middleham
- House: York
- Father: Richard III of England
- Mother: Anne Neville

Edward of Middleham, Prince of Wales (c. December 1473 or 1476 – 9 April 1484), was the son and heir apparent of King Richard III of England by his wife Anne Neville. He was Richard's only legitimate child and died aged seven or ten.

== Birth and titles ==
Edward was born at Middleham Castle, a stronghold close to York that became Richard and Anne's principal base in northern England. The exact date of his birth is uncertain, with contemporary records suggesting a range from late 1473 to mid-1476. The traditional date of December 1473 originates from post-contemporary Tudor-era chronicles, but historian Charles Ross argued that 1473 "lacks authority" and suggested Edward was probably not born until 1476, based on sources indicating no children existed by 1474. A well-informed contemporary source from September 1483 described him as "a little over seven years old" at his investiture as Prince of Wales, supporting a birth around 1476.

The act of Parliament in May 1474 that settled the inheritance dispute between George of Clarence and Richard, treating the Countess of Warwick as "naturally dead," included clauses protecting Richard and Anne's rights in case of divorce but made no provisions for heirs, which aligns with them having no children at that time.

Edward was mostly kept at Middleham and was known to be a sickly child, though there is no conclusive evidence of chronic illness.

In 1478, Edward was granted the title of Earl of Salisbury, previously held by the attainted George Plantagenet, 1st Duke of Clarence. The title became extinct on his death. His father became King of England on 26 June 1483, deposing Edward's cousin Edward V. Edward did not attend his parents' coronation, probably due to illness. He was created Prince of Wales and Earl of Chester in a splendid ceremony in York Minster on 8 September 1483, following his parents' royal progress across England.

== Death ==
Edward died suddenly in April 1484. The Croyland Chronicle states it occurred "on a day not very far distant from the anniversary" of his uncle Edward IV's death (9 April 1483), leading to the common attribution of 9 April 1484. However, historian John Rous indicated death at "Easter-time" (Easter Sunday was 18 April 1484), suggesting a possible later date around mid-April. The cause is unknown, with speculation including tuberculosis or another short illness.

The Croyland Chronicle reads:

However, in a short time after, it was fully seen how vain are the thoughts of a man who desires to establish his interests without the aid of God. For, in the following month of April, on a day not very far distant from the anniversary of king Edward, this only son of his, in whom all the hopes of the royal succession, fortified with so many oaths, were centred, was seized with an illness of but short duration, and died at Middleham Castle, in the year of our Lord, 1484, being the first of the reign of the said king Richard. On hearing the news of this, at Nottingham, where they were then residing, you might have seen his father and mother in a state almost bordering on madness, by reason of their sudden grief.

Edward's sudden death left Richard without a legitimate child. Contemporary historian John Rous recorded that Richard declared his nephew Edward, Earl of Warwick, his heir-presumptive, but there is no other evidence of this, and it seems unlikely as Richard's own claim was based on the attainting of Warwick's father. Similarly, John de la Pole, 1st Earl of Lincoln also seemed to have been designated as Richard's heir-presumptive, but was never publicly proclaimed as such.

Richard's enemies were inclined to believe that Edward's sudden death was divine retribution for Richard's alleged involvement in the usurpation and subsequent disappearance of the sons of Edward IV, his nephews Edward V of England and Richard, Duke of York. It may have also emboldened them to renew hostilities.

== Burial ==
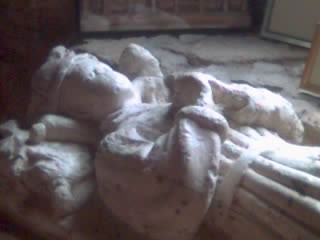
Effigy at Sheriff Hutton Church in North Yorkshire, long believed to represent Edward of Middleham, but now thought to be an earlier work

The location of Edward's burial remains unknown. Contemporary sources like John Rous state he was "honourably buried at Middleham." Other proposed sites include Coverham Abbey, Jervaulx Abbey, York Minster, and Sheriff Hutton. A mutilated white alabaster cenotaph ("empty tomb") in the Church of St Helen and the Holy Cross at Sheriff Hutton in North Yorkshire, with an effigy of a child, was long believed to represent Edward of Middleham, but is now thought to be an earlier work depicting one of the Neville family, possibly from the first half of the 15th century. It may have been a temporary resting place while a more permanent site was arranged.

== Legacy ==

To mark the 550th anniversary of the birth of Richard III’s son and heir, Edward of Middleham, a new plaque by the Richard III Society was unveiled in St Mary and St Alkelda Church by Philippa Langley. The unveiling took place on 8 September 2026. On this day in 1483, Edward of Middleham had been invested Prince of Wales in York. A leaflet about Edward of Middleham, Prince of Wales, and his probable burial in the church accompanies the new plaque.

St Mary and St Alkelda Church at Middleham became a collegiate church in 1477 under Richard III (as Duke of Gloucester) and a Royal Peculiar during his reign. John Rous, the contemporary writer with close connections to the family, recorded: "the child died before his parents and is committed honourably to burial at Middleham.

== Titles, styles, and arms ==
=== Titles ===
- 15 February 1478 onwards: Earl of Salisbury
- 26 June 1483 onwards: Duke of Cornwall
- 19 July 1483 onwards: Lord Lieutenant of Ireland
- 8 September 1483 onwards: Prince of Wales and Earl of Chester

=== Arms ===
Edward's coat of arms as Prince of Wales

From 1483 to 1484, Edward used the arms of his father, differenced with a label of three points Argent.

== Ancestry ==
Ancestors of Edward of Middleham, Prince of Wales

8. Richard of Conisburgh, 3rd Earl of Cambridge
4. Richard Plantagenet, 3rd Duke of York
9. Anne de Mortimer
2. Richard III of England
10. Ralph Neville, 1st Earl of Westmorland
5. Cecily Neville
11. Joan Beaufort
1. Edward of Middleham, Prince of Wales
12. Richard Neville, 5th Earl of Salisbury
6. Richard Neville, 16th Earl of Warwick
13. Alice Montacute, 5th Countess of Salisbury
3. Anne Neville
14. Richard Beauchamp, 13th Earl of Warwick
7. Anne Beauchamp, 16th Countess of Warwick
15. Isabel le Despenser

== Bibliography ==
- Kendall, Paul Murray (1955). Richard the Third. Allen & Urwin. OCLC 3007470.
- Panton, Kenneth J. (2011). Historical Dictionary of the British Monarchy. Scarecrow Press. ISBN 978-0-8108-5779-7.
- Hammond, P. W. (1973). Edward of Middleham, Prince of Wales. [Publisher not specified].
- Pugh, T. B. (1971). Glamorgan County History III. [Publisher not specified].

Edward of Middleham, Prince of Wales House of York Cadet branch of the House of Plantagenet Born: December 1473 Died: 9 April 1484
English royalty
Vacant Title last held by Edward of the Sanctuary	Prince of Wales; 1483–1484	Vacant Title next held by Arthur Tudor
Peerage of England
Vacant Title last held by Edward of the Sanctuary	Duke of Cornwall; Earl of Chester; 1483–1484	Vacant Title next held by Arthur Tudor
Political offices
Vacant Title last held by The Duke of Bedford	Lord Lieutenant of Ireland; 1483–1484	Vacant Title next held by The Marquess Cornwallis
