= Middleham Castle =

12th-century castle in Middleham, England

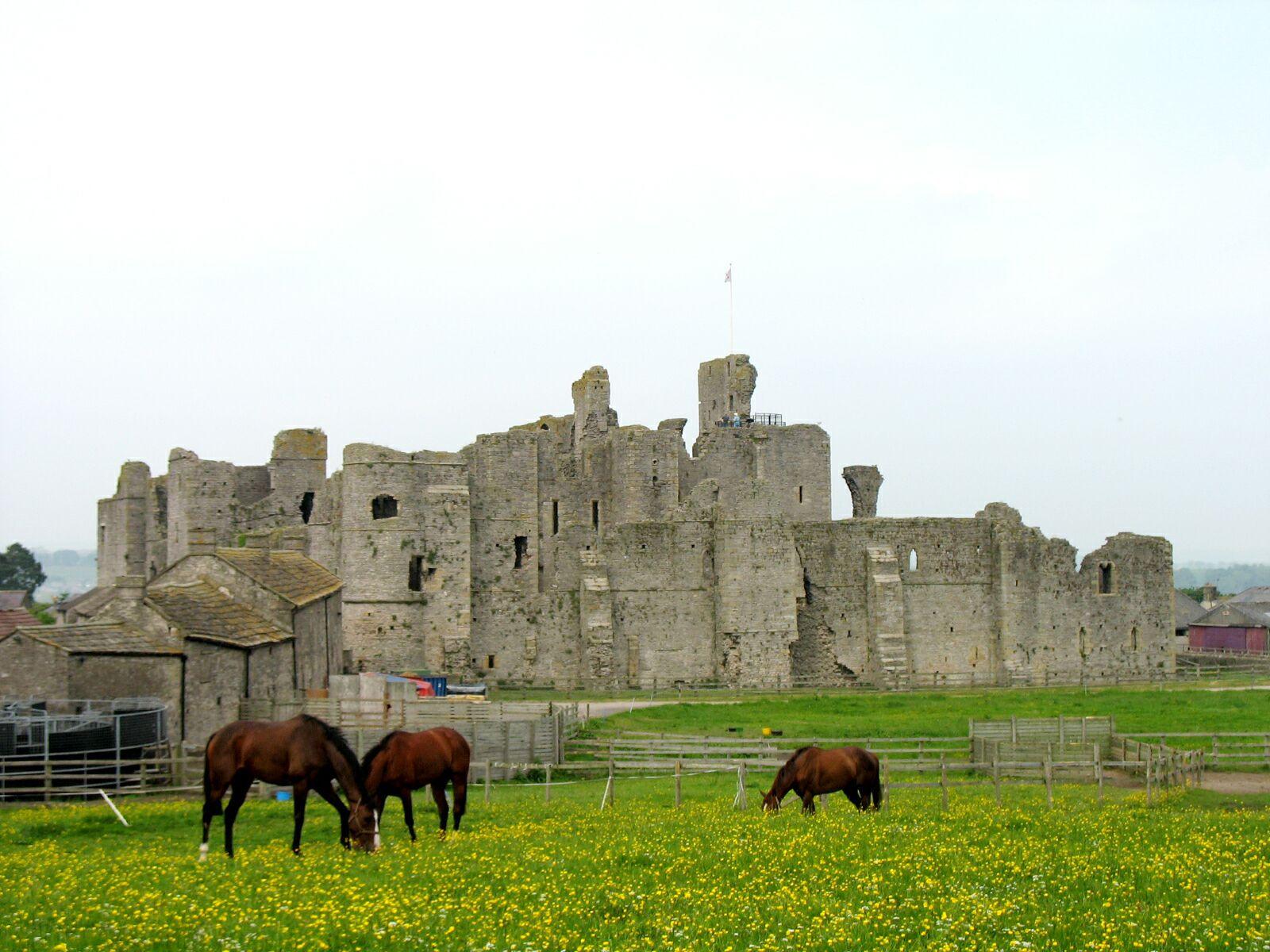
- Middleham Castle

Site information
- Controlled by: English Heritage
- Open to the public: Yes

Location
- Coordinates: 54.284065°N 1.806900°W

Site history
- Built: 1190
- Fate: Ruined

Listed Building – Grade I
- Official name: Middleham Castle
- Designated: 6 January 1970
- Reference no.: 1318543

Middleham Castle is a ruined castle in Middleham in Wensleydale, in the county of North Yorkshire, England. It was built by Robert Fitzrandolph, 3rd Lord of Middleham and Spennithorne, commencing in 1190. The castle was the childhood home of King Richard III, although he spent very little of his reign there. The castle was built to defend the road from Richmond to Skipton, though some have suggested the original site of the castle was far better to achieve this than the later location. After the death of King Richard III the castle remained in royal hands until it was allowed to go to ruin in the 17th century. Many of the stones from the castle were used in other buildings in the village of Middleham.

== History ==
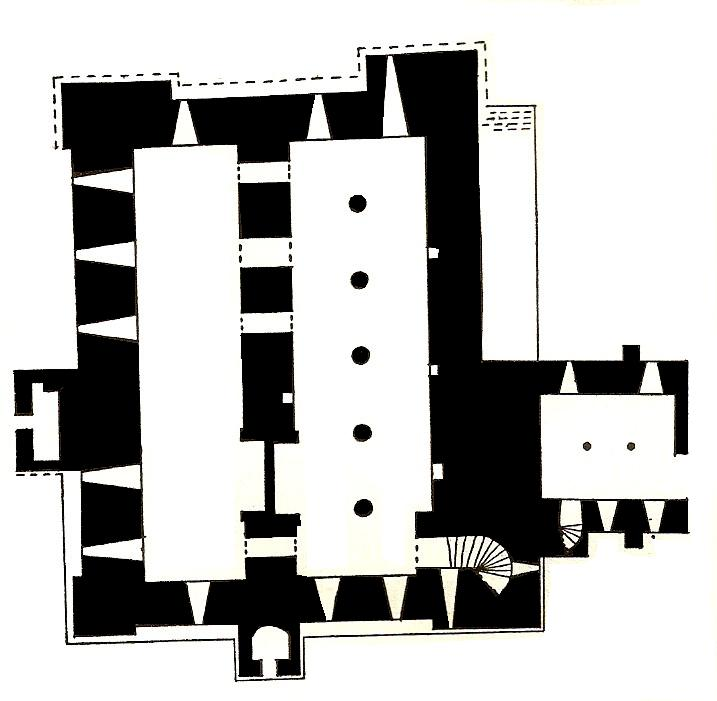
Middleham Castle plan

Middleham Castle was built near the site of an earlier motte and bailey castle, called William's Hill, the site of which can still be seen nearby, although there is no evidence of stonework or defensive structures to the former castle site. Historians believe that the defensive walls of the original castle were constructed from timber. In 1270 the new Middleham Castle came into the hands of the Neville family, the most notable member of which was Richard Neville, 16th Earl of Warwick, known to history as the "Kingmaker", a leading figure in the Wars of the Roses. Following the death of Richard, Duke of York, at Wakefield in December 1460, his younger son, Richard, Duke of Gloucester, came into Warwick's care, and lived at Middleham with Warwick's family. His brother King Edward IV was imprisoned at Middleham for a short time, having been captured by Warwick in 1469. Following Warwick's death at Barnet in 1471 and Edward's restoration to the throne, his brother Richard married Anne Neville, Warwick's younger daughter, and made Middleham his main home. Their son Edward (known as Edward of Middleham), was also born at the castle around 1473 or 1476 and later also died there in 1484.

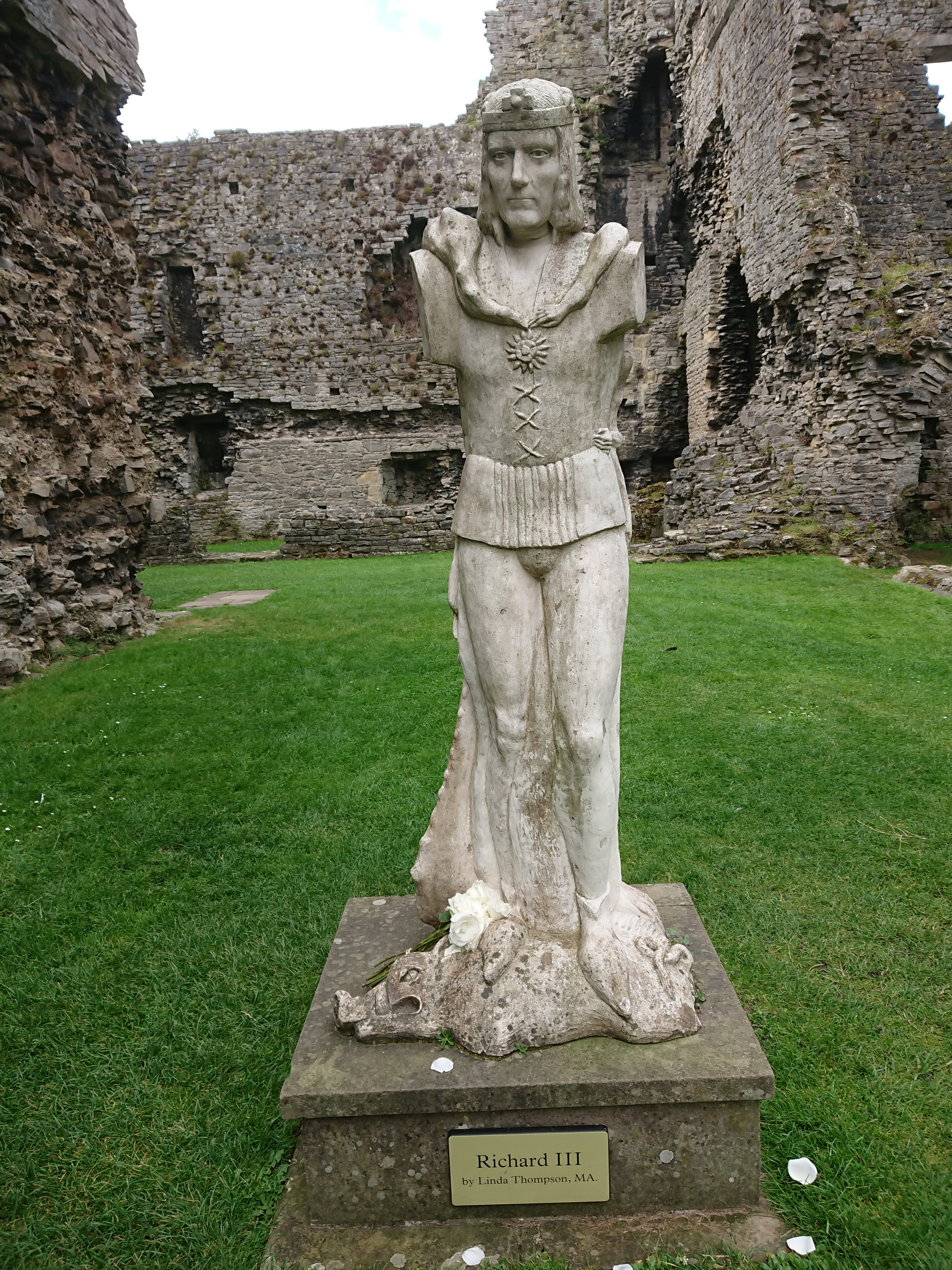
Modern statue of Richard III, who grew up at Middleham Castle, by Linda Thompson

Richard ascended to the throne as King Richard III, but spent little or no time at Middleham in his two-year reign. After Richard's death at Bosworth in 1485 the castle was seized by Henry VII and remained in royal hands until the reign of James I, when it was sold. During the reign of Elizabeth I, the castle was proposed for full demolition by Lord Huntingdon and eventual conversion into a Manor House. A letter was written by Huntingdon to the Lord Treasurer outlining the plan and its possible use by the Queen when on her royal duties. The castle fell into disuse and disrepair during the 17th century. In 1644, a parliamentary Committee sitting in Yorkshire ordered that it was "untenable and no garrison should be kept there". Later still, some of the castle's walls were blown away and the stones of the castle became a public quarry by which many of the buildings in Middleham were created. It was garrisoned during the Civil War in 1654 and 1655, when it was host to thirty men and capable of housing prisoners. There is no record of action at the site nor was it put under siege.

In 1604, the castle was passed to Sir Henry Linley and then sold to the Wood family in 1662 who held onto the property until 1889. The ruins are now in the care of English Heritage who took them on in 1984, and are now Grade I listed.

== Description ==
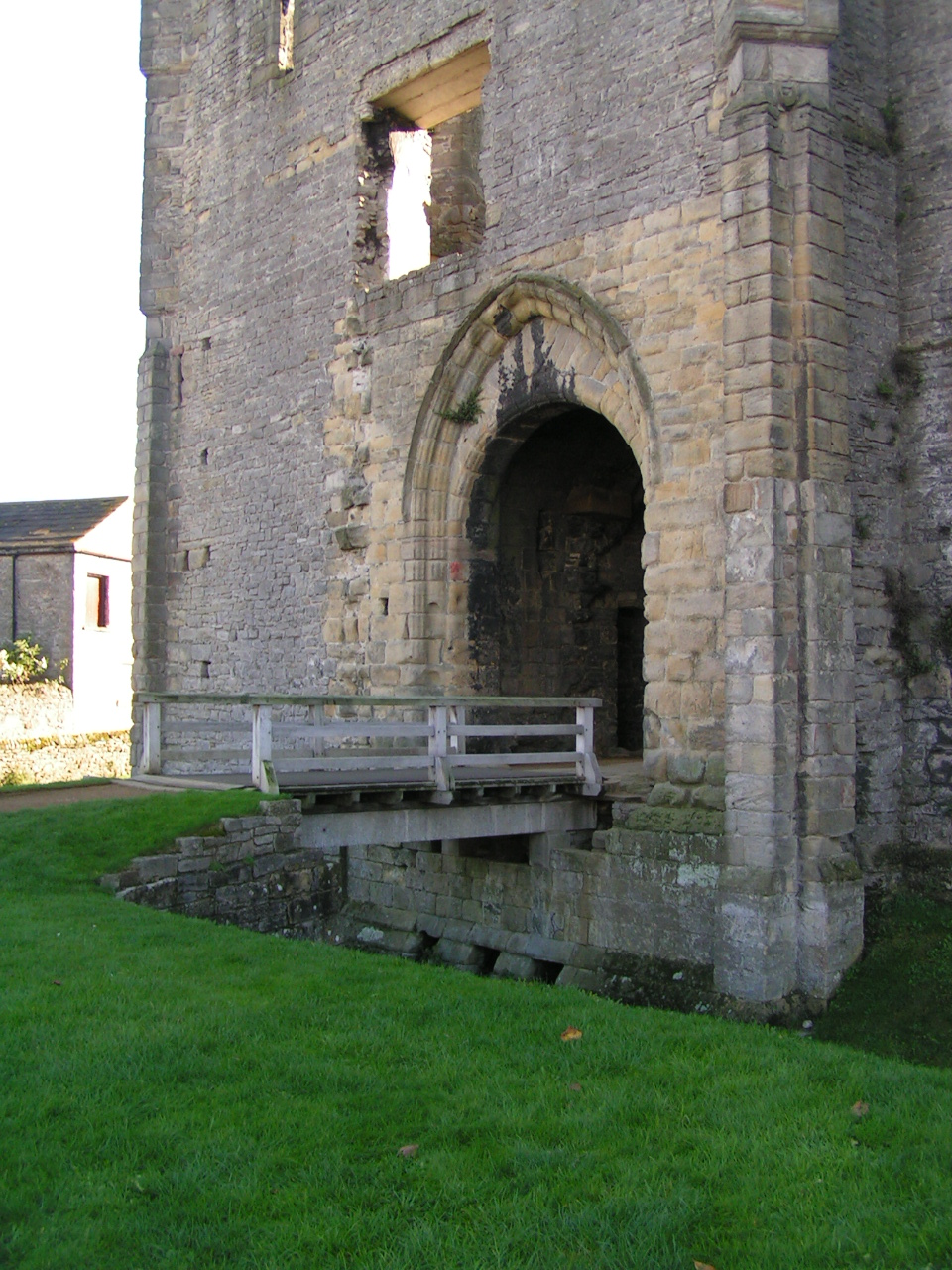
Gatehouse of Middleham Castle

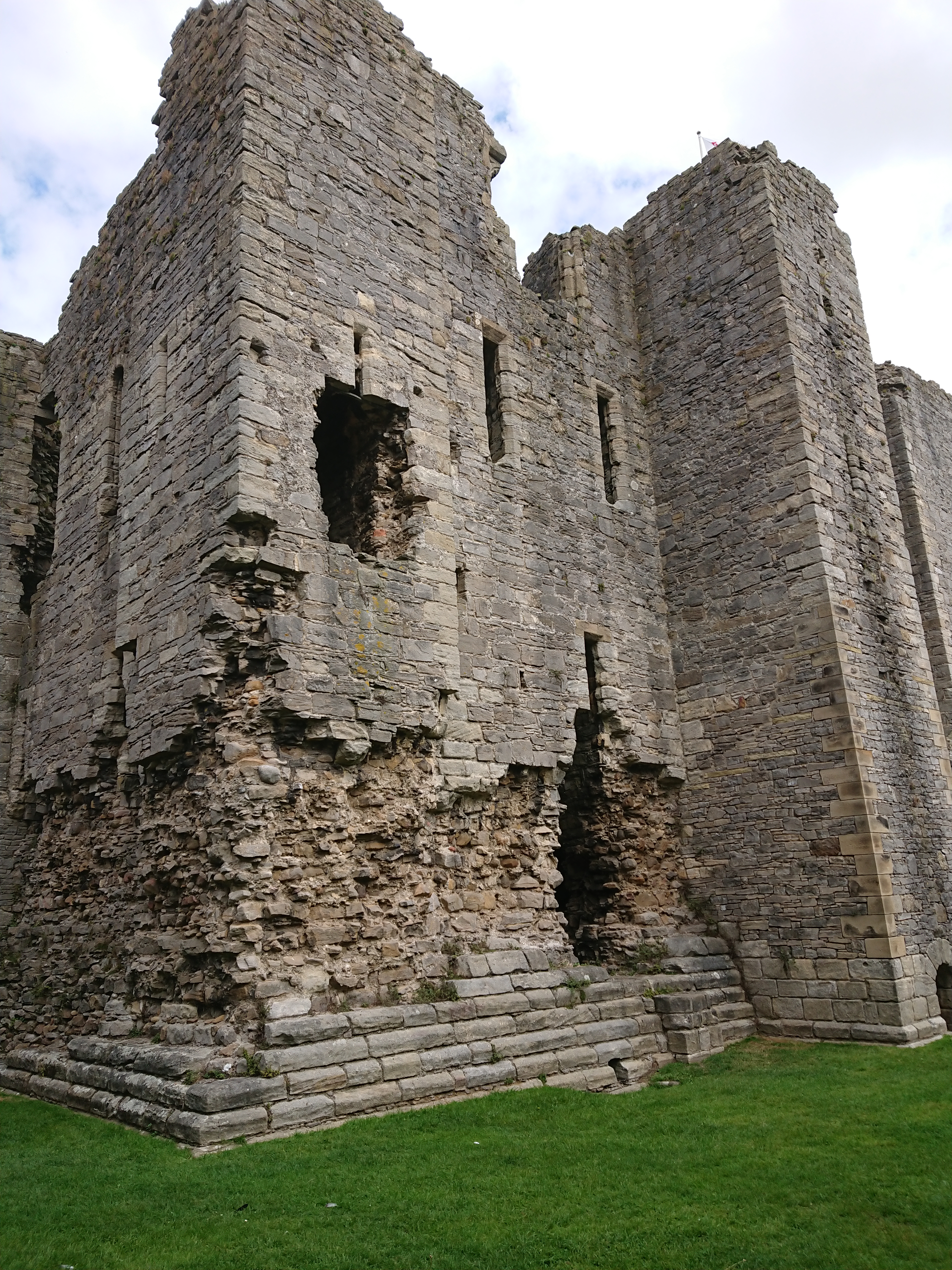
Remaining wall with arrow slits for defence

The castle is a compact, massive structure, and though ruinous, most of the walls are intact. A simple rectangle in plan, the castle consists of a massive Norman keep surrounded by a later curtain wall, to which were then added extensive, palatial residential ranges. The location of the castle was as a safe refuge on the road from Richmond to Skipton, and in this respect, it guarded the road and the area of Coverdale. Pevsner comments that the site of the original castle which had a motte of 40 feet (12 m) was far better placed to defend the road than the latter castle of 1190.

The keep is similar to other large square keeps, but had only two storeys, even so, at 105 feet (32 m) from north to south and 78 feet (24 m) west to east, is one of the largest in England. It is divided on both levels by an internal wall, and there are turrets at each corner and midway along each wall. The ground floor has two large, originally vaulted, chambers, and above are two grand halls surrounded by high windows. The entrance is by staircase to the first floor—as was common—and a later chapel outbuilding defends that approach. A repaired spiral staircase leads up to the top of the south-east corner tower, affording views of the surrounding town and countryside, including the original castle motte to the south-west. The south-west tower is sometimes referred to as the Prince's Tower on account of Richard III's son, Edward, having been born in the tower, though there is no documentary evidence of this: in a survey conducted in 1538, it is simply referred to as the "Rounde Towre".

The 13th-century curtain wall surrounds the keep concentrically, making the castle into a compact and effective defensive structure, though it was built more for comfort than security. In the 15th century the Nevilles constructed an impressive range of halls and outbuildings against these walls, turning the castle into a truly magnificent residence, fit for nobles of their stature. Bridges at first-floor level were built to connect these to the keep, and the ceiling above the great hall was also raised, either to provide a clerestory or space for another chamber.

The entrance to the castle is through a tower in the north-east corner, though this was also a 15th-century modification. Only foundations remain of the original gatehouse, facing east into the now-vanished outer ward. The gatehouse was remodelled in the 14th century with diagonal turrets and flanked by an arch. Spaces in the stonework were provided so that missiles could be launched on would-be attackers. Apart from this east wall, however, the circuit of the walls is fairly complete, though the walls of the residential buildings are gone. Some restoration was done on the castle in modern times, but there is extensive damage to the lower faces of the keep. Windows and doorways have crumbled away, floors have fallen in, and none of the battlements remain. Still, the castle is an impressive ruin, and the sense of its original strength and grandeur remains.

As a tourist attraction, the castle has about 400,000 visitors a year (average for 2010–2021).

== See also ==
- Castles in Great Britain and Ireland
- List of castles in England
- Middleham Jewel
- Grade I listed buildings in North Yorkshire (district)
- Listed buildings in Middleham
