= Middleham =

Market town in North Yorkshire, England

Coordinates: 54°17′09″N 1°48′32″W

- Town
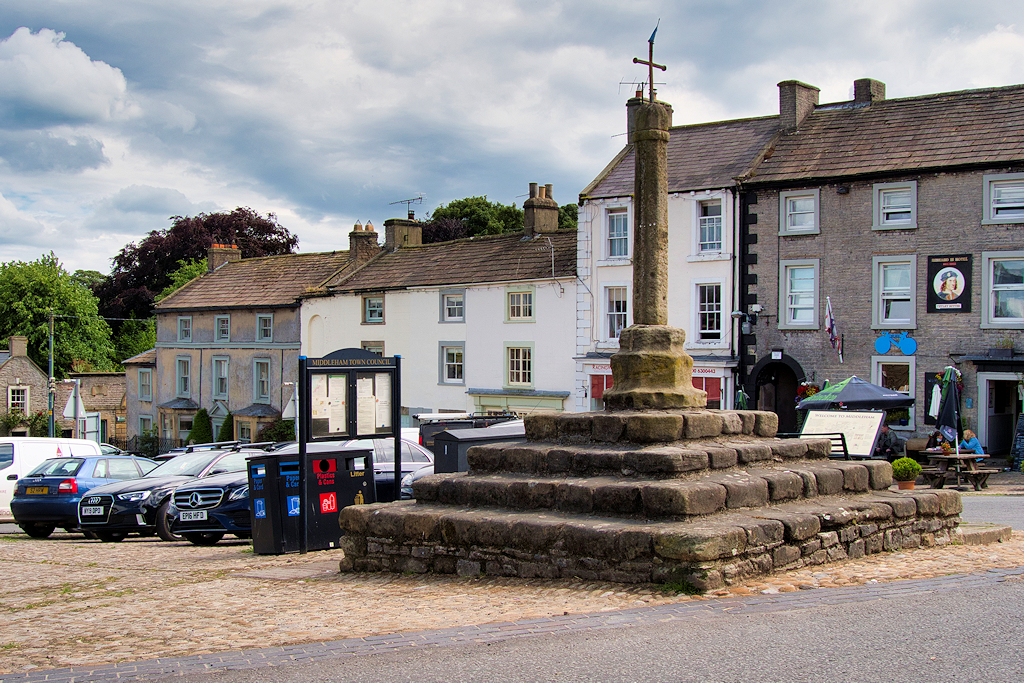
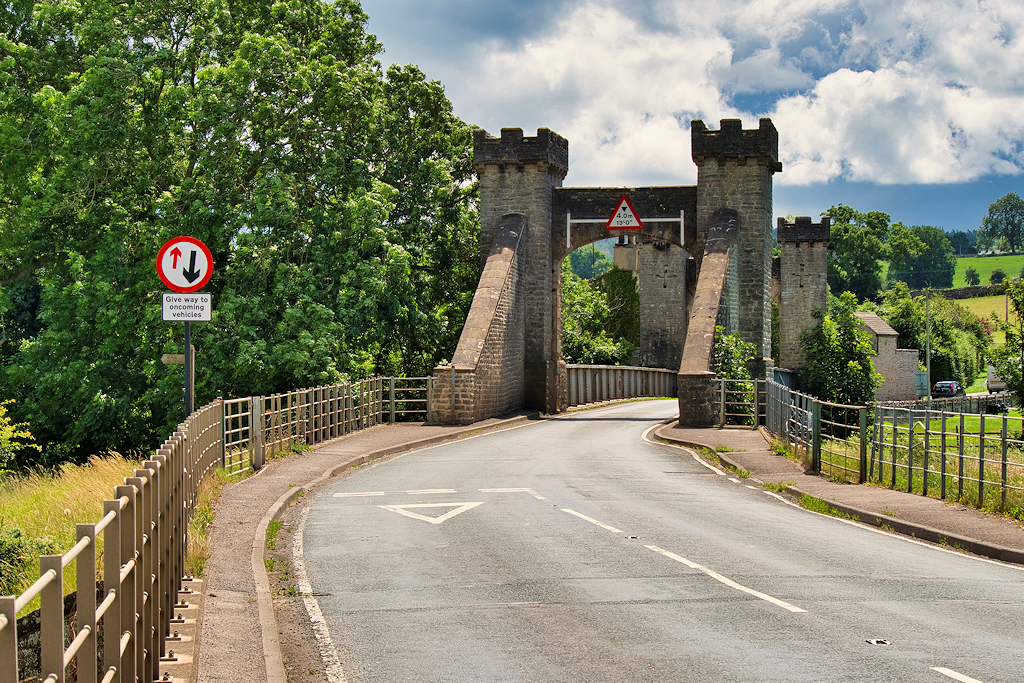
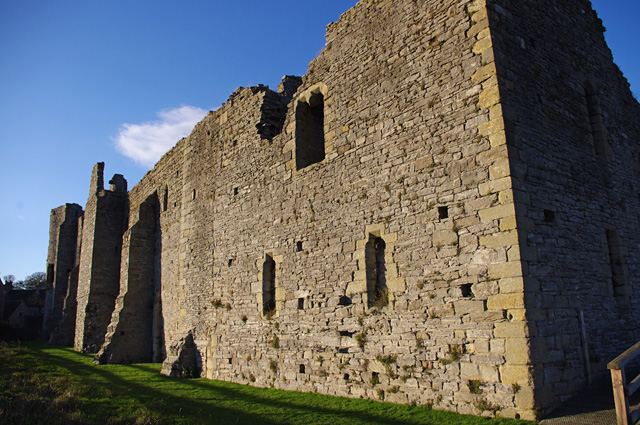
- Market Cross Mightens Bank Castle

- Location within North Yorkshire
- Population: 825 (2011 census)
- OS grid reference: SE124878
- Unitary authority: North Yorkshire
- Ceremonial county: North Yorkshire
- Region: Yorkshire and the Humber
- Country: England
- Sovereign state: United Kingdom
- Post town: LEYBURN
- Postcode district: DL8
- Dialling code: 01969
- Police: North Yorkshire
- Fire: North Yorkshire
- Ambulance: Yorkshire
- UK Parliament: Richmond and Northallerton

Middleham (/ˈmɪdələm/ MID-əl-əm; meaning "middle ham", i.e. "middle village") is a former market town and civil parish in the district and county of North Yorkshire, England. It lies in Wensleydale in the Yorkshire Dales, on the south side of the valley, upstream from the confluence of the River Ure and River Cover. There has been a settlement there since Roman times. It was recorded in the 1086 Domesday Book as Medelai.

== History ==
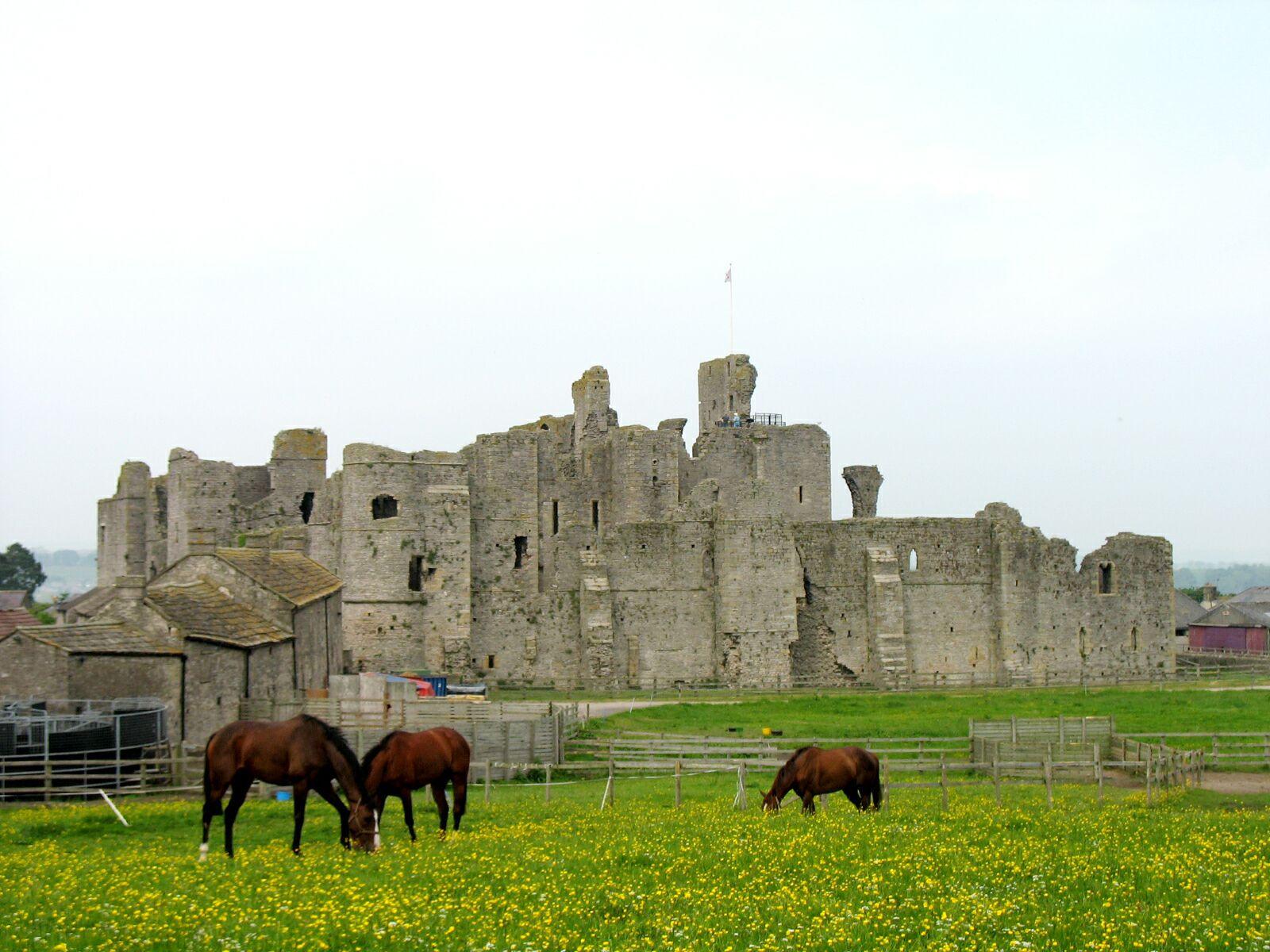
Middleham Castle

Though there is no evidence of civil settlement in the Roman period, a rural villa was discovered in the 19th century some 330 yards (300 m) east of the castle, in farmland south of the road to Masham. A branch road from the major Roman thoroughfare of Dere Street passed by, across the valley, through the fort of Wensley to the Roman site of Virosidium at Bainbridge.

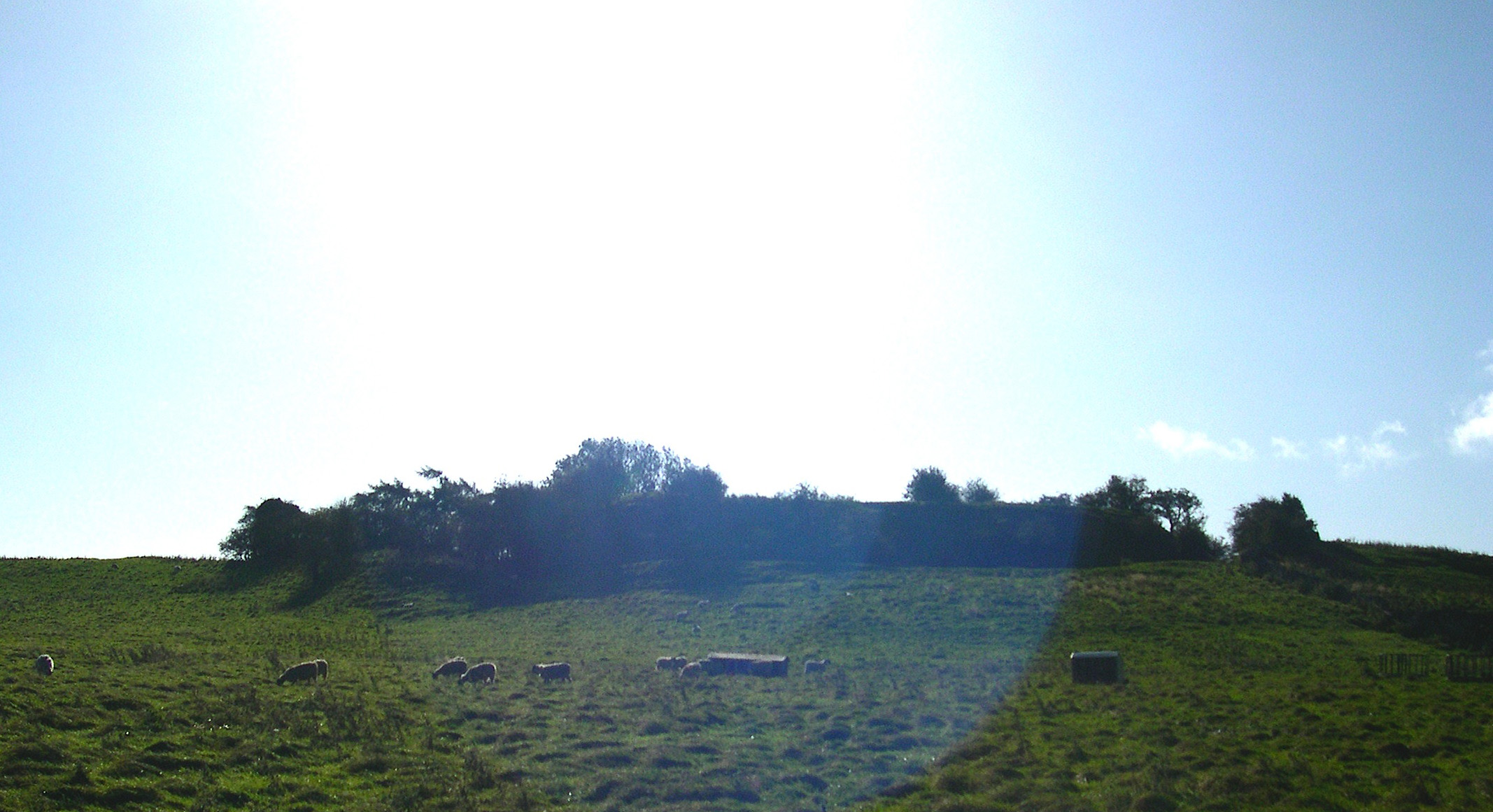
William's Hill is the remaining earthworks of the Motte-and-Bailey Castle Alan Rufus built.

Before the Norman Conquest, the lands around were controlled by Gilpatrick. In 1069, William the Conqueror granted them to his Breton cousin Alan Rufus, who built a wooden motte-and-bailey castle above the town. By the time of the 1086 Domesday Book, Alan had passed the castle to his brother Ribald. Its earthworks are still visible at William's Hill. Alan also built the castle at Richmond.

Construction began in 1190 of Middleham Castle, which still dominates the town. The Nevilles, Earls of Westmorland, acquired it through marriage to a female descendant of Ribald in the 13th century. It has been dubbed the "Windsor of the North". The castle belonged to Richard Neville, 16th Earl of Warwick, when his cousin Richard, Duke of Gloucester (the future Richard III) came there to learn knighthood skills in 1462. During the Wars of the Roses, both Edward IV and Henry VI were held prisoner there. Richard, Duke of Gloucester, became master of the castle in 1471 after Warwick's death at the Battle of Barnet. He used it as his political base for ruling the North on behalf of his brother Edward IV. Richard married Warwick's daughter, Anne Neville, in 1472. Middleham Castle is where their son Edward was born in about 1473 and died in April 1484. Richard III, who died in August 1485 at the Battle of Bosworth, was the last reigning King of England to perish in battle.

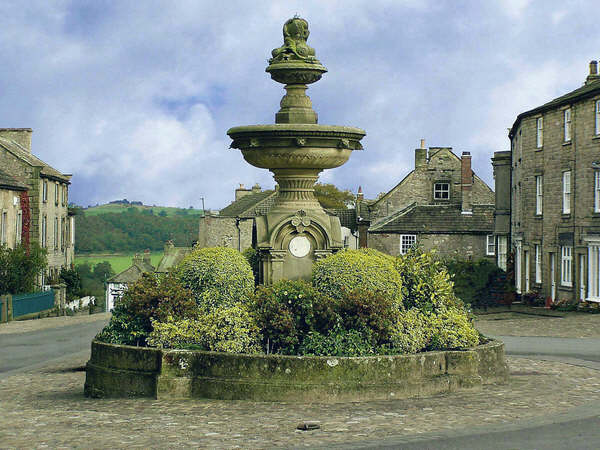
Middleham Victoria Jubilee Fountain

Under Richard III, Middleham was a bustling market town and political centre. In 1389, the Lord of Middleham Manor received a crown grant to hold a weekly market and yearly fair on the feast of St Alkelda the Virgin. The town has market places: the larger, lower one is dominated by Middleham Market Cross, topped by a modern iron cross in Celtic style. The upper or swine market centres on the remains of the 15th-century Swine Cross and a line of steps. At one end of the cross is a worn effigy of an animal reclining; the other may have had a moulded capital.

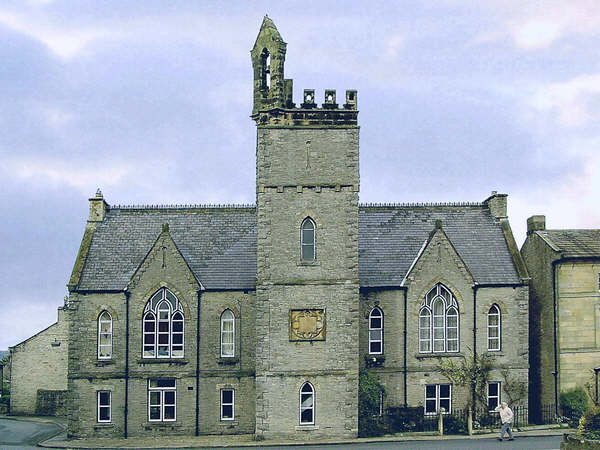
The Old School House

Most buildings in old parts of Middleham predate 1600. The old rectory incorporates some medieval features. In 1607 Middleham was important enough to house a royal court for residents of the forest of Wensleydale. Middleham and surrounding lands were part of the Crown estates from the accession of Richard III until Charles I sold the manor to the City of London in about 1628. In 1661 the City of London sold Middleham Manor on to Thomas Wood of Littleton. It has remained in private hands since then. In 1915 the annual livestock market was still regionally important, but the weekly market had been discontinued. Today's livestock market is in Leyburn.

== Parish church ==
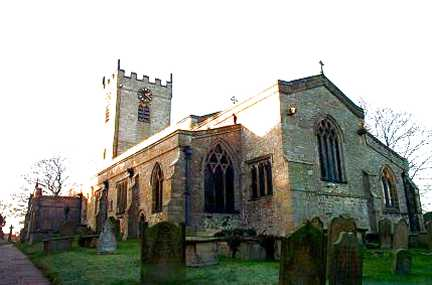
Church of Saints Mary and Alkelda

The Church of Saints Mary and Alkelda was founded in 1291. Its mainly 14th and 15th-century architecture includes some stones that indicate a church on the site perhaps a century before. The only remaining Norman artefact is a section of zigzag moulding that once surrounded a door or window and now appears above the north aisle. The church has a three-metre Perpendicular font cover and a replica of the Middleham Jewel, found locally. West of the church is St Alkelda's Well, whose waters were once said to restore weak eyes.

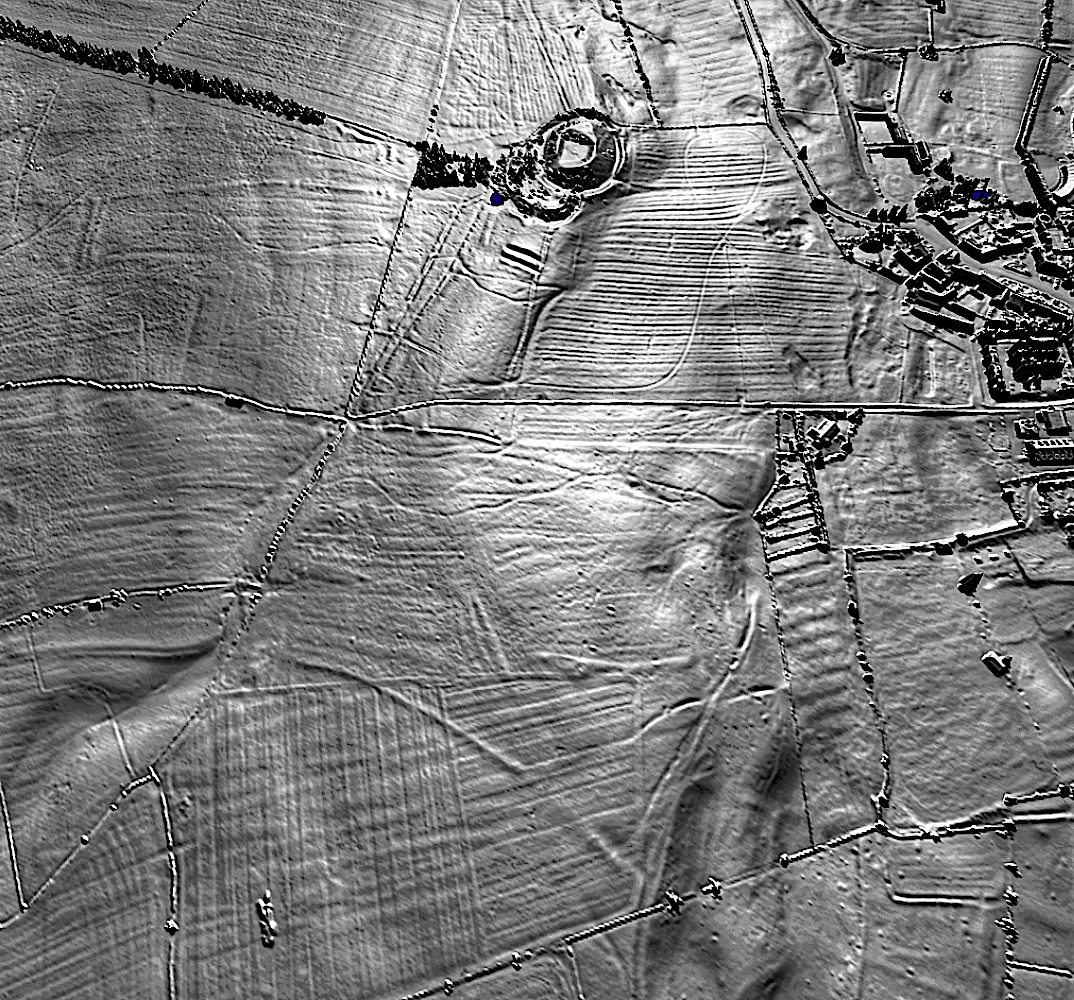
A lidar view of William's Hill Motte and Bailey Castle.

In 1478 Edward IV gave permission for a leper hospital to be built on the east side of town, in conjunction with the church. The location, Chapel Fields, now holds a horse-training stables. No trace of a hospital or chapel remains.

== Middleham today ==
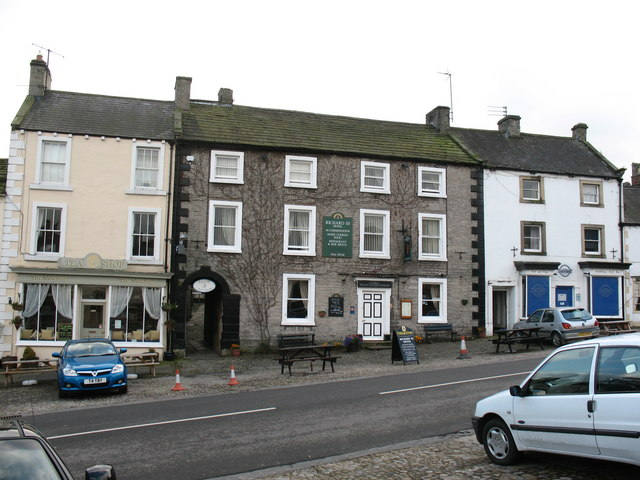
The Richard III Hotel

Today's Middleham is a centre of horse racing and home to Middleham Trainers' Association. The first racehorse trainer at Middleham was Isaac Cape in 1765. Today there are several, including Mark Johnston, Jedd O'Keefe, James Bethell, and Ben Haslam. Racing is the foremost employer in the town and tourism the second. The castle is a ruin, having been dismantled in 1646, but the keep, built by Robert Fitz Ralph in the 1170s, survives, as do the 13th-century chapel and 14th-century gatehouse.

Middleham has four pubs, a village shop, a fish and chip shop, a tea room, several bed and breakfast suppliers, a primary school and nursery and a community centre called Middleham Key Centre. The picture depicts the Richard III Hotel. The building next door was a tearoom called The Nosebag. It is now a Racing Welfare office providing support and guidance to hundreds of stable staff based in and around the town.

== Governance ==
Middleham is part of the Richmond and Northallerton parliamentary constituency. The current Member of Parliament is Rishi Sunak, a Conservative, who is also a former Prime Minister of the United Kingdom. His predecessor was William Hague, former Conservative Party Leader and Foreign Secretary, who represented the constituency from 1989 to 2015.

An electoral ward of the name exists, stretching south-west to Melmerby in Coverdale. Its population in the 2011 census was 1,284, when the parish population was 825 in the 2011 census, estimated at 781 in 2019.

From 1974 to 2023 it was part of the district of Richmondshire. It is now administered by the unitary North Yorkshire Council.

== Treasure and archaeological finds ==
=== Middleham Jewel ===
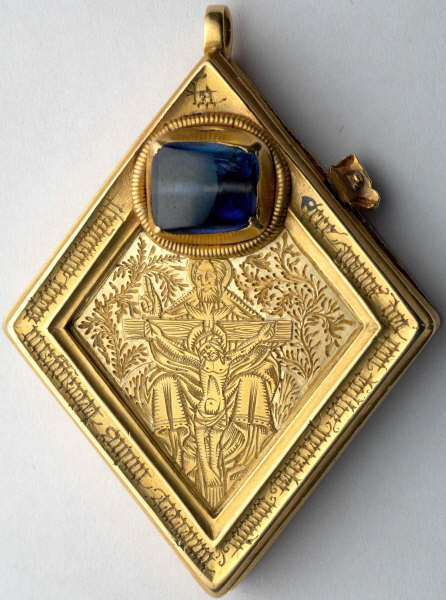
The front of the Middleham Jewel showing the Crucifixion of Jesus

In 1985 the Middleham Jewel was found on a bridle path near Middleham Castle by Paul Kingston and Ted Seaton using a metal detector. A late 15th-century 68-gram gold pendant with a 10-carat blue sapphire stone, it has since passed to the Yorkshire Museum in York for £2.5 million. The lozenge pendant, engraved on the obverse with a representation of the Trinity, is bordered by a Latin inscription warding off the evil of epilepsy. The reverse has a decorative engraving of the Nativity, bordered by faces of 13 saints.

The back panel slides to reveal a hollow interior, which originally contained three-and-a-half tiny discs of silk embroidered with gold thread. The textile contents identify the jewel as a reliquary, containing a fragment of reputed holy cloth. It would have been worn by a lady of high social status as the crest for a large necklace. The sapphire may represent Heaven, and have acted as an aid to prayer.

=== Other notable finds ===
Other notable finds from Middleham include:

- The Middleham Hoard – three pots containing 5,099 silver coins in total, buried in the English Civil War. This is the largest such hoard ever found.
- A livery badge for pinning to the chest or a hat, in gilded copper high relief, with Richard III's emblem of a white boar – this is likely to have been worn by one of his household, when he was Duke of Gloucester.
- The Middleham ring in the Yorkshire Museum, found in 1990 – this gold ring is decorated with a low-relief inscription along the band reading SOVEREYNLY.
- A circular, copper-alloy plaque (3-inch (70 mm) diameter) bearing the initials "R" and "A" surrounded by the French motto A Vo. Plaisir (For your pleasure) – this may be a casket mark given by Richard, Duke of Gloucester to his wife Anne.

== Media ==
Local news and television programmes are provided by BBC North East and Cumbria and ITV Tyne Tees. Television signals are received from the Bilsdale transmitter.

Local radio stations are BBC Radio York on 104.3 FM, BBC Radio Tees can also be received on 95.0 FM, Greatest Hits Radio York & North Yorkshire on 103.5 FM and Dales Radio on 104.9 FM.

The town is served by the local newspapers, The Northern Echo and Darlington & Stockton Times.

== Geography and geology ==
The town lies between 400 and 500 feet (120 and 150 m) above ordnance datum. The valley of the River Ure below the town has an altitude of 325 feet (99 m) and the summit of the hill to the south-west of the town of 850 feet (260 m). The parish contains 2,155 acres (872 ha) of land, mostly permanent pasture with about 150 acres (61 ha) arable. The topsoil is mixed. The valley has modern alluvial terraces and gravel deposits, but the subsoil is mainly limestone, intersected here and there by sandstone with plate. There is a known vein of lead in the northern part of the parish. Braithwaite lead mine lies just outside the parish borders.

== Notable people ==
In birth order:

- Anne Neville (1456–1485), consort of King Richard III of England, spent most of her childhood at the castle.
- Edward of Middleham, Prince of Wales (1473–1484) was born and died at the castle.
- Tobias Pullen (1648–1713), religious controversialist and Church of Ireland bishop, was born in the town.
- John Baynes (1758–1787), miscellanist and lawyer, was born in the town.
- Job Marson (1817–1857), a celebrated jockey, died at Middleham.
- John Osborne Jr. (c. 1833–1922), jockey.

== Popular culture ==
Middleham appeared three times in the UK television series All Creatures Great and Small. The episode "Against the Odds" had the Manor House as the home of the Barraclough family. In the episode "Where Sheep May Safely Graze", Middleham Antiques, in North Road, became Geoff Hatfield's confectionery shop. Ferndale became the home of the Darnley sisters in the episode "The Rough and the Smooth".

== Twin town ==
Middleham is twinned with Azincourt, France.

== See also ==
- Listed buildings in Middleham
