= Anne Neville =

Queen of England from 1483 to 1485

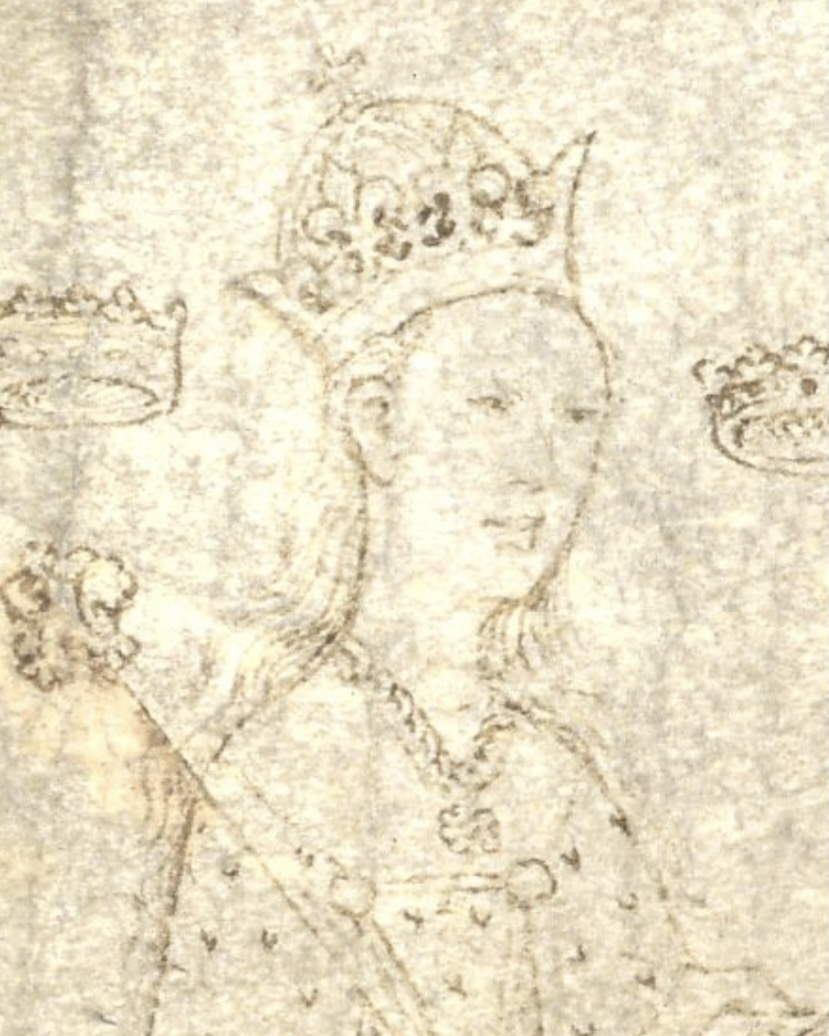
- Drawing from the Rous Roll, c. 1483

Queen consort of England
- Tenure: 26 June 1483 – 16 March 1485
- Coronation: 6 July 1483
- Born: 11 June 1456; Warwick Castle, Warwickshire, England
- Died: 16 March 1485 (aged 28); Palace of Westminster, London, England
- Burial: 25 March 1485; Westminster Abbey, London, England
- Spouses: Edward of Westminster, Prince of Wales (m. 1470; died 1471) Richard III of England (m. 1472)
- Issue: Edward of Middleham, Prince of Wales
- House: Neville
- Father: Richard Neville, 16th Earl of Warwick
- Mother: Anne Beauchamp, 16th Countess of Warwick

Anne Neville (11 June 1456 – 16 March 1485) was Queen of England from 26 June 1483 until her death in 1485 as the wife of King Richard III. She was the younger of the two daughters and co-heiresses of Richard Neville, 16th Earl of Warwick (the "Kingmaker"), and Anne Beauchamp, 16th Countess of Warwick. Before her marriage to Richard, she had been Princess of Wales as the wife of Edward of Westminster, Prince of Wales, the only son and heir apparent of King Henry VI.

As a member of the powerful House of Neville, Anne played a critical part in the Wars of the Roses fought between the houses of York and Lancaster for the English crown. Her father betrothed her as a girl to Prince Edward, the only son of the ousted king Henry VI and Margaret of Anjou. The marriage was to seal an alliance with the Lancastrians and halt the Wars of the Roses.

After the death of Prince Edward and defeat of the Lancastrians at the Battle of Tewkesbury in 1471, Anne married Richard, Duke of Gloucester, younger brother of King Edward IV and of George, Duke of Clarence, the husband of Anne's elder sister Isabel. Richard was also Anne's first cousin once removed; her great-aunt, Cecily Neville, Duchess of York, was Richard's mother. Anne became queen when Richard acceded to the throne in June 1483, following the declaration that Edward IV's children by Elizabeth Woodville were illegitimate. Anne predeceased her husband by five months, dying in March 1485. Her only child, Edward of Middleham, died in 1484 at the age of seven.

== Early life ==
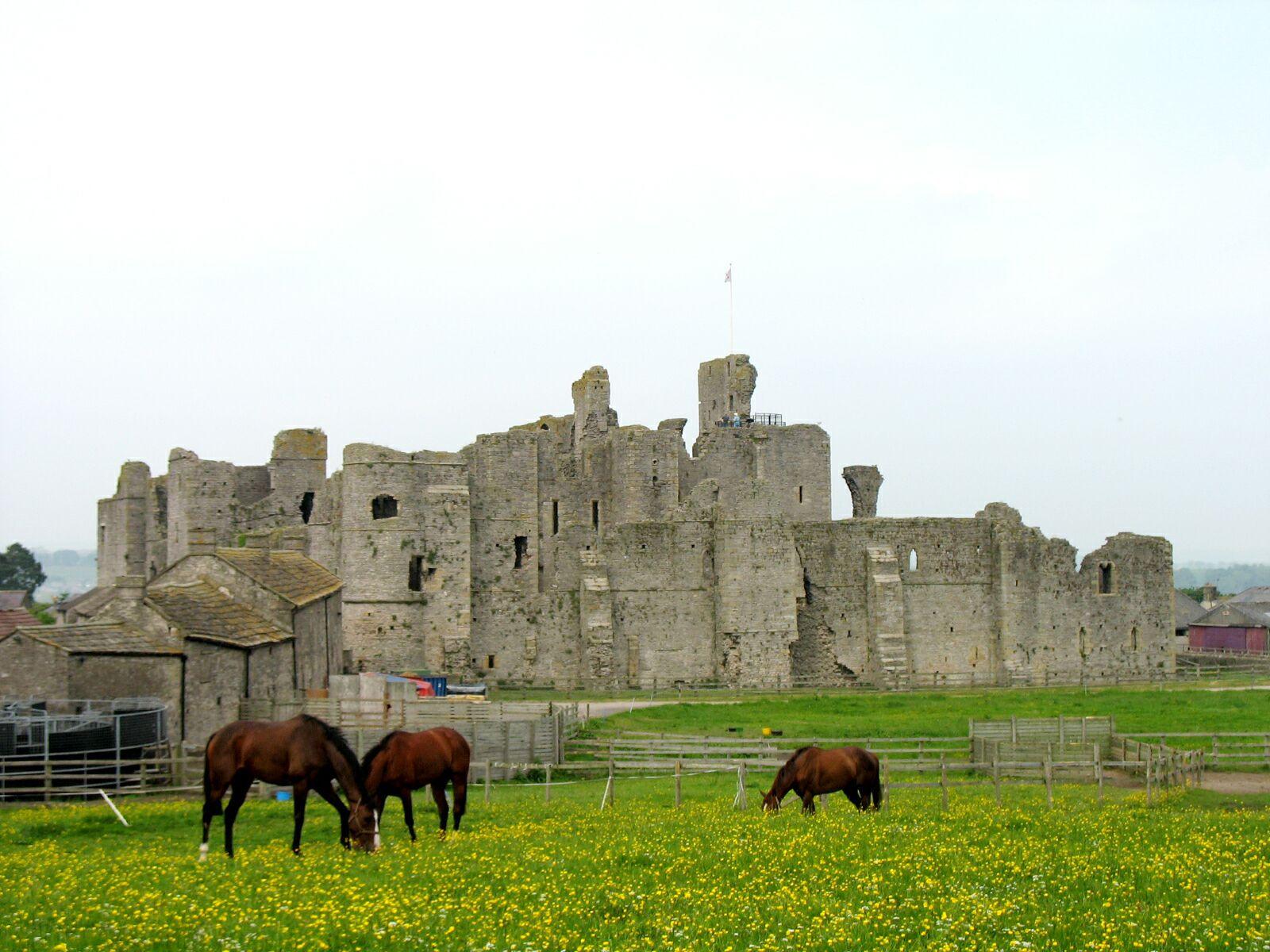
Middleham Castle came into the possession of the Neville family in 1270.

Anne Neville was born at Warwick Castle on 11 June 1456, the younger daughter of Richard Neville, 16th Earl of Warwick, and Anne de Beauchamp. Her father was one of the most powerful noblemen in England and the most important supporter of the House of York. Her grandfather's sister, Cecily Neville, was the wife of Richard, Duke of York, who claimed the crown for the House of York.

Much of Anne Neville's childhood was spent at Middleham Castle, one of her father's properties, where she and her elder sister, Isabel, met two younger sons of the Duke of York: Richard, Duke of Gloucester (the future Richard III) and George, Duke of Clarence. Richard especially attended his knighthood training at Middleham since mid-1461 until at least the spring of 1465, or possibly since 1465 until late 1468. It is possible that even at this early stage, a match between the Earl's daughters and the young dukes was being considered. The Duke of York was killed on 30 December 1460 but, with Warwick's help, his eldest son became King Edward IV in March 1461. In July 1469, Lady Isabel married Clarence, while in July 1470, after the Earl of Warwick's flight to France and change of allegiance, Anne Neville was betrothed to Edward of Westminster, the Lancastrian heir to the throne of England, and married to him by the end of the same year.

== Princess of Wales ==
The Earl of Warwick had been at odds with Edward IV for some time, resenting his clandestine marriage to Elizabeth Woodville and the subsequent rise in the king's favour of the new queen's family, the Woodvilles. In 1469, the earl tried to put his son-in-law George on the throne, but met resistance from Parliament. After a second rebellion against King Edward failed in early 1470, he was forced to flee to France, where he allied himself with the ousted House of Lancaster in 1470. With King Henry VI imprisoned in the Tower of London, the de facto Lancastrian leader was his consort, Margaret of Anjou, who was suspicious of Warwick's motives. To quell these suspicions, Anne Neville was formally betrothed to the son of Henry VI and Margaret of Anjou, Edward of Westminster, at the Château d'Amboise in France. They were married in Angers Cathedral, probably on 13 December 1470, to make Anne Neville the Princess of Wales.

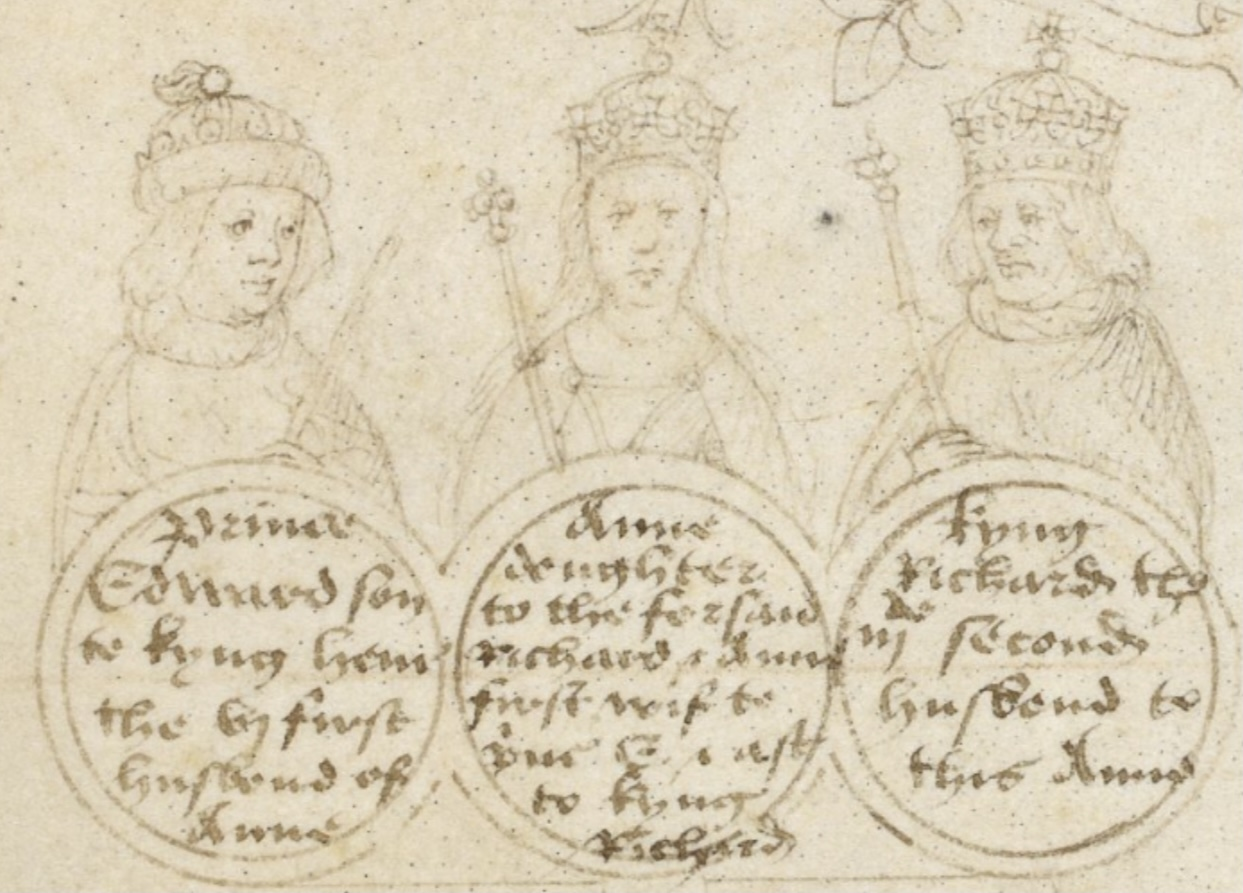
Drawing of Anne and her two husbands from the Beauchamp Pageant, c. 1483-1494

Warwick restored Henry VI to the throne in October 1470; Edward IV however returned to the country in March 1471 and quickly captured London and the person of Henry VI. The mentally challenged Henry VI was taken by Edward IV as a prisoner to the Battle of Barnet, where Warwick was killed on 14 April 1471. Edward IV then incarcerated Henry VI in the Tower of London. Following the decisive Yorkist victory at the Battle of Tewkesbury on 4 May, Henry was reported to have died of "pure displeasure and melancholy," although "The Great Chronicle of London" reported that Richard, Duke of Gloucester, was responsible for his death. As Constable of England, he probably delivered King Edward's order to kill Henry to the Constable of the Tower.

Margaret of Anjou had returned to England with Anne Neville and Prince Edward in April, bringing additional troops. At the Battle of Tewkesbury, Edward IV crushed this last Lancastrian army. Prince Edward was killed in or shortly after the battle, and Anne Neville was taken prisoner. She was taken first to Coventry and then to the house of her brother-in-law the Duke of Clarence in London, while her mother Anne Beauchamp, Warwick's wife, sought sanctuary in Beaulieu Abbey. When the crisis settled down and the Countess wished to be restored to her estates, Edward IV refused her safe conduct to plead her case; she wrote to Queen Elizabeth and several others to no avail.

Anne, now widowed, became the subject of some dispute between George of Clarence and his brother Richard of Gloucester, who still wanted to marry her. Anne Neville and her sister, the Duchess of Clarence, were heiresses to their parents' vast estates. Clarence, anxious to secure the entire inheritance, treated her as his ward and opposed her getting married, which would strengthen her position to claim a share.

There are various accounts of what happened subsequently, including the story that Clarence hid her in a London cookshop, disguised as a servant, so that his brother would not know where she was. Gloucester is said to have tracked her down and escorted her to sanctuary at the Church of St Martin's le Grand. In order to win the final consent of his brother George to the marriage, Richard of Gloucester renounced most of Warwick's land and property, including the earldoms of Warwick (which the earl had held in his wife's right) and Salisbury and surrendered to Clarence the office of Great Chamberlain of England.

== Duchess of Gloucester ==
The exact date of the wedding of Anne Neville and Richard, Duke of Gloucester, is not known, although most sources agree that a ceremony took place sometime in the late spring/early summer of 1472 in St Stephen's Chapel in the Palace of Westminster, after a dispensation to marry was issued from Rome on 22 April 1472. This dispensed the impediment of affinity created when Anne married Edward of Lancaster, who was Richard's blood cousin. The couple made their marital home in the familiar surroundings of Middleham Castle, Yorkshire, after Richard was appointed Governor of the North on the king's behalf. Upon her marriage, Anne was styled Duchess of Gloucester. They had only one child, Edward, born at Middleham allegedly sometime in 1473, but more probably in 1476. Anne's mother, the Countess of Warwick, joined her daughter's household in 1473 after Richard obtained the king's permission to release his mother-in-law from her guarded sanctuary.

In 1478, Anne Neville inherited the Lordship of Glamorgan. The title had been held by her father and on his death had passed to Anne's elder sister Isabel Neville. Women could not exercise the Lordship in their own right, so the title immediately transferred to Isabel's husband, George Plantagenet, 1st Duke of Clarence. On his death in February 1478, the title passed to Anne and was henceforth exercised by her husband, Richard of Gloucester until his death, when it passed to the new king, Henry VII.

== Queen of England ==
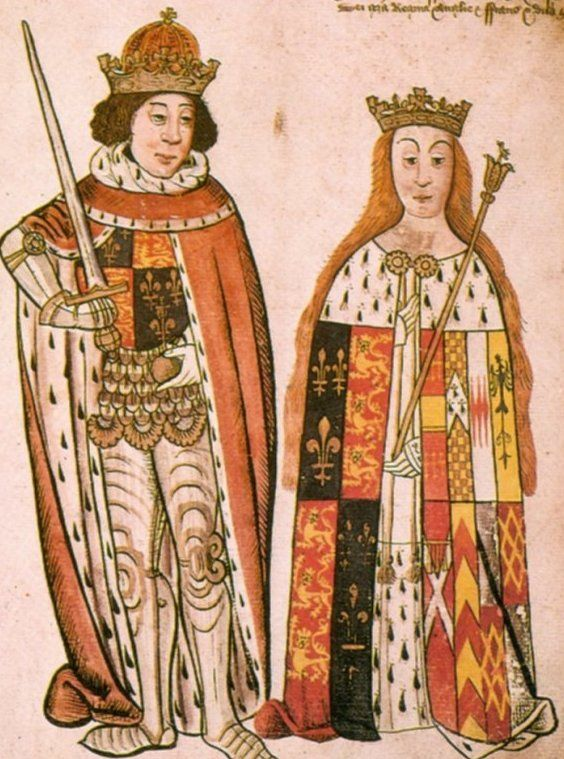
Drawing of Richard and Anne as King and Queen from the Salisbury Roll, c. 1483–1485.

On 9 April 1483, Edward IV died and Anne's husband Richard was named Lord Protector for his 12-year-old nephew Edward V. But on 25 June 1483, Edward V and his siblings were declared illegitimate and Richard ascended the throne as King Richard III. Anne Neville was crowned alongside her husband on 6 July 1483 by Thomas Bourchier, Archbishop of Canterbury, the first joint coronation in England in 175 years. The queen's train was borne by Margaret, Countess of Richmond, whose son would become Henry VII after defeating Richard at the Battle of Bosworth. Almost the entire peerage of England was present at what was a magnificent spectacle. Richard and Anne's son, Edward of Middleham, was created Prince of Wales in York Minster on 8 September 1483 following their Royal Progress across England.

Anne was on good terms with her mother-in-law Cecily Neville, Duchess of York, with whom she discussed religious works, such as the writings of Mechtilde of Hackeborn.

Edward of Middleham died suddenly in April 1484 at Middleham Castle, while his parents were in Nottingham on their way to visit him. Both Richard and Anne were overwhelmed with grief at this news. Anne was particularly heartbroken, and she fell gravely ill only a few months later.

After the death of her son, Anne Neville effectively adopted her nephew Edward, Earl of Warwick. After Anne Neville died, Richard may have named another nephew, John de la Pole, Earl of Lincoln, as his heir presumptive.

== Death ==
Anne Neville died on 16 March 1485, probably of tuberculosis, at Westminster. The day she died, there was an eclipse, which some took to be an omen of her husband's fall from heavenly grace. She was buried in Westminster Abbey in an unmarked grave to the right of the High Altar, next to the door to the Confessor's Chapel. Richard III is said to have wept at her funeral. Nevertheless, rumours circulated that Richard III had poisoned her in order to marry his niece Elizabeth of York.

Richard sent Elizabeth away from court to Sheriff Hutton and publicly rebutted these rumours on 30 March 1485 during an assembly of Lords he had summoned at the Hospital of St. John. Addressing them "in a loud and distinct voice", he "showed his grief and displeasure aforesaid and said it never came into his thought or mind to marry in such manner wise, nor willing nor glad of the death of his queen but as sorry and in heart as heavy as man might be …". There is no reason to doubt that Richard's grief over his wife's death was genuine. Documents later found in the Portuguese royal archives show that after Anne's death, Richard's ambassadors were sent on a formal errand to negotiate a double marriage between Richard and the Portuguese king's sister Joanna (who was of Lancastrian descent), and Elizabeth of York and Joanna's cousin Duke Manuel (the future Manuel I).

There was no memorial to Queen Anne until 1960, when a bronze tablet was erected on a wall near her grave by the Richard III Society.

Coat of arms of Anne Neville
Notes As Queen, Anne Neville bore the arms of her husband, King Richard III, impaled with the Neville arms without difference. Anne Neville sometimes bore her father, Lord Warwick's, full achievement, however at other times she also bore the arms of Neville without difference by a label for Lancaster (larger coat of arms). Adopted 1483 Escutcheon Quarterly, 1st and 4th, France moderne, 2nd and 3rd England; impaled with Gules, a saltire Argent. Symbolism The other version of Anne Neville's arms as queen bore that of her husband, King Richard, Quarterly, 1st and 4th, France moderne, 2nd and 3rd England, impaled with the full achievement of Anne Neville's father; of seven, 1st, Gules, a fess between six crosses crosslet Or (Beauchamp), 2nd, Chequy Or and Azure, a chevron ermine (Newburgh), 3rd, Argent, three lozenges conjoined in fess Gules (Montacute), 4th, Or, an eagle displayed Vert (Monthermer), 5th, Gules a saltire Argent, a label of three points gobony Argent and Azure (Neville), 6th, Or, three chevrons Gules (Clare), 7th, Quarterly, Argent and Gules, a fret Or, overall a bendlett Sable (Despencer). The coat of arms of Richard Neville, 16th Earl of Warwick used almost all typical forms of heraldry in England: the first quarter consisted of his father-in-law, Richard de Beauchamp, who bore with an escutcheon of De Clare quartering Despenser, which was shown in Neville's fourth quarter. The second quarter showed the arms of the Montacutes (Montagu). The third quarter showed the arms of Neville differenced by a label for Lancaster.

== Cultural depictions ==
=== Theatre and film ===
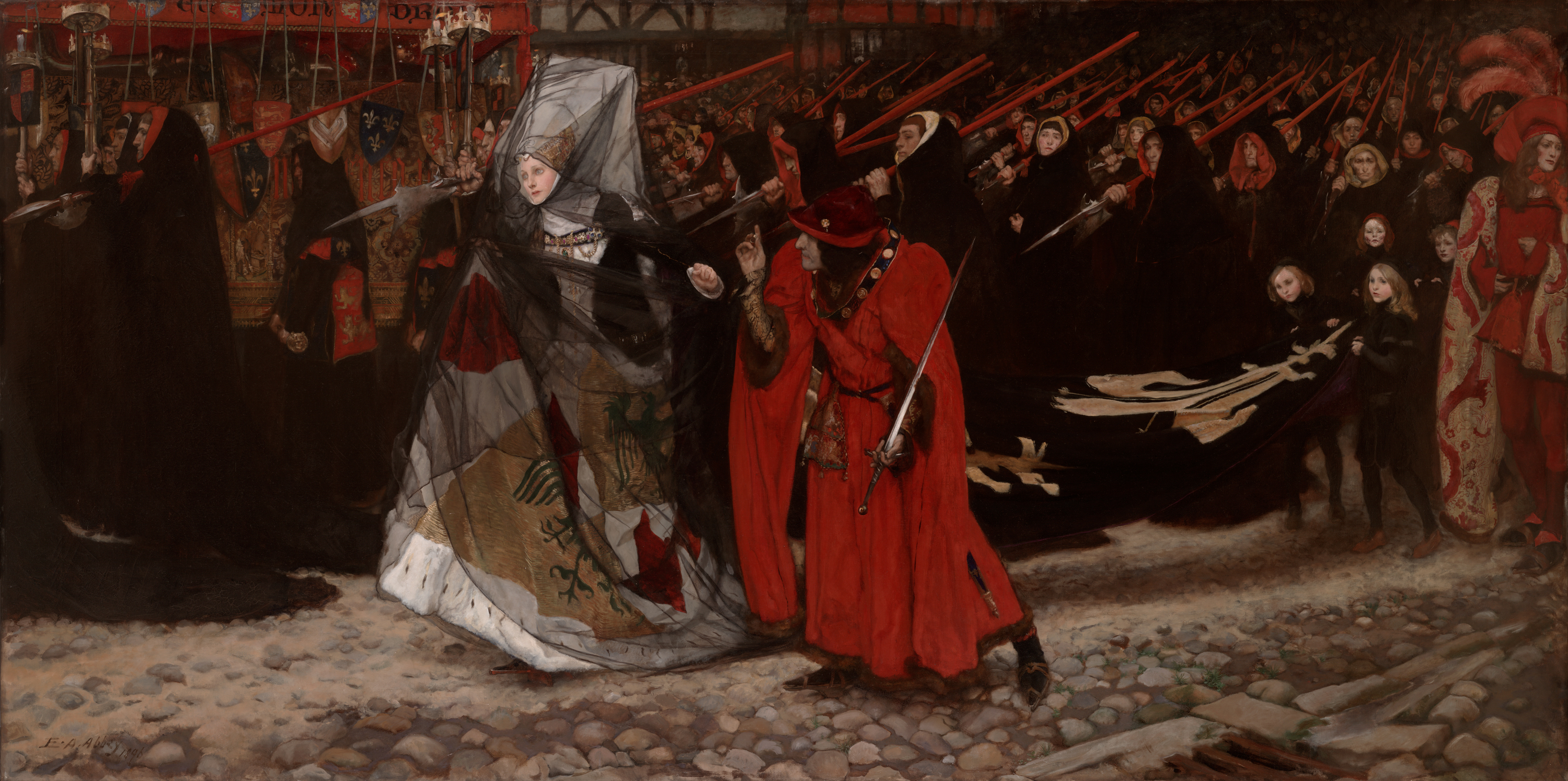
Richard, Duke of Gloucester and the Lady Anne by Edwin Austin Abbey.

Anne Neville appears in three scenes in William Shakespeare's Richard III. In Act I, Scene 2, Richard III persuades her to marry him. In Act IV, Scene 1, just before Richard III's coronation, Anne Neville meets Edward IV's widow and laments her own position. In Act V, Scene 3, Anne Neville is one of the ghosts that appear to Richard III.

The role has been played in film by

- Claire Bloom in Richard III (1955)
- Zoe Wanamaker in the BBC television adaptation (1983)
- Kristin Scott Thomas in Richard III (1995)
- Winona Ryder in Looking for Richard (1996)
- Faye Marsay in The White Queen (2013)
- Phoebe Fox in The Hollow Crown: The Wars of the Roses (2016)

Anne Neville is also a character in the 1939 film Tower of London (played by Rose Hobart), and its 1962 remake (1962) (played by Joan Camden).

In German productions of musical Tanz Der Vampire (Dance of the Vampires) at the ball of Count von Krolock there are several historical figures among vampires, including Anne Neville and her husband King Richard III.

=== Novels ===
Anne Neville is a major character in several historical novels.

She is the title character in:

- Gladys Malvern, The Queen's Lady (1963), historical fiction for teen readers
- Jan Westcott, Set Her on a Throne (1972)
- Frances Irwin, The White Pawn (1972)
- Frances Irwin, The White Queen (1974), sequel to The White Pawn
- Evelyn Hood, The Kingmaker’s Daughter (1974)
- Hilda Brookman Stanier, The Kingmaker’s Daughter (1978)
- Lesley J. Nickell, The White Queen (1978), reprinted in 2014 as "The White Queen of Middleham"
- Maureen Peters, Beggar Maid, Queen (1980)
- Philippa Wiat, The Kingmaker's Daughter (1989)
- Jean Plaidy, The Reluctant Queen: The Story of Anne of York (1990)
- Eleanor Mennim, Anne Neville, Queen of England (1999), a fictional biography
- Anne O'Brien, The Virgin Widow (2010)
- Philippa Gregory, The Kingmaker's Daughter (2012)
- Julie May Ruddock, A Daughter of Warwick (2012)
- Paula Simonds Zabka, Anne of Warwick The Last Plantagenet Queen (2012)
- Liz Orwin, The Maid's Tale: Anne (2016)

Anne Neville is one of the main characters in:

- Olive Eckerson, The Golden Yoke (Coward-McCann, 1961)
- Margaret Davidson, My Lords Richard (1979)
- Rhoda Edwards, Fortune's Wheel (1978) and The Broken Sword (also titled "Some Touch of Pity", 1977)
- Anne Powers, The Four Queens (1977) (also known as The Royal Consorts (1978) or Queen's Ransom (1986))
- Sharon Kay Penman, The Sunne in Splendour (1982)
- Paula Simonds Zabka, Desire the Kingdom (2002)
- Sandra Worth's The Rose of York trilogy - Love and War (2003), Crown of Destiny (2006), and Fall From Grace (2007)
- Sylvia Charlewwod, King Richard III & Anne Neville: their love story (2015)
- J.P. Reedman, I, Richard Plantagenet (2016)

=== Non-fiction ===
- J. L. Laynesmith, The Last Medieval Queens: English Queenship 1445–1503 (2004)
- Michael Hicks, Anne Neville: Queen to Richard III (2006)
- Amy Licence, Anne Neville: Richard III's Tragic Queen (2013)
- Alison Weir, Queens at War: England's Medieval Queens, Book Four (2025)

English royalty
Vacant Title last held by Elizabeth Woodville	Queen consort of England; Lady of Ireland; 26 June 1483 – 16 March 1485	Vacant Title next held by Elizabeth of York
Vacant Title last held by Joan of Kent	Princess of Wales; 13 December 1470 – 4 May 1471	Vacant Title next held by Catherine of Aragon
