= 1927 New Year Honours =

British royal recognitions

The New Year Honours were appointments by King George V to various orders and honours to reward and highlight good works by citizens of the United Kingdom and British Empire. They were announced on 31 December 1926.

The recipients of honours are displayed here as they were styled before their new honour, and arranged by honour, with classes (Knight, Knight Grand Cross, etc.) and then divisions (Military, Civil, etc.) as appropriate.

== United Kingdom and British Empire ==
=== Viscount ===
- The Right Honourable Sir James Craig Bt JP DL Prime Minister of Northern Ireland.
- The Right Honourable John Andrew, Baron Sumner GCB Lord of Appeal in Ordinary.

=== Baron ===
- Sir George Hayter Chubb Bt JP Chairman of Nonconformist Unionist Association since its foundation in 1886. For political and public services.
- Colonel Fiennes Stanley Wykeham Cornwallis CBE TD JP DL Member of Parliament for Maidstone, 1888–1895, and 1898–1900. Chairman of Kent County Council since 1910. For political and public services.
- Sir Charles Greenway Bt Chairman of the Anglo-Persian Oil Company. Ltd.

=== Privy Councillor ===
The King appointed the following to His Majesty's Most Honourable Privy Council:

- The Honourable William George Arthur Ormsby-Gore JP DL MP Under-Secretary of State for the Colonies, 1922–24, and since November, 1924. Member of Parliament for Denbigh District, 1910–18, and for Stafford since December, 1918.
- Sir Leslie Frederic Scott KC MP Member of Parliament for the Exchange Division of Liverpool since 1910. Solicitor-General, March to October, 1922.

=== Baronetcies ===
- Lieutenant-Colonel Edwin Bolton MBE Convener and Vice-Lieutenant of the County of Stirling.
- Sir Edward Rae Davson, President of the Associated West Indian Chambers of Commerce.
- Sir Joseph Duveen. For public services.
- Major George Richard James Hennessy OBE JP MP Vice-Chamberlain of the Household since December, 1925. Lord Commissioner of the Treasury, 1923 to January, 1924, and November, 1924 to December, 1925. Member of Parliament for Winchester since 1918.
- Sir John Scott Hindley, Commercial Adviser, Mines Department since 1918. For public services.
- William Lewthwaite JP DL Chairman of the Conservative Association for the Egremont (now Whitehaven) Division of Cumberland, 1904–1924, and Treasurer for many years previous to 1904. For political and public services.
- Basil Edward Peto JP MP Member of Parliament for Devizes, 1910–18; Barnstaple, 1922–23 and since 1924. For political and public services.

=== Knight Bachelor ===
- Major Richard Ludwig Bagge DSO JP DL For political and public services in Norfolk.
- George William Barber JP Chairman of the Twickenham Division Conservative Association. For political and public services in Middlesex.
- Alderman Percival Bower MBE JP Lord Mayor of Birmingham, 1924–26.
- William Henry Clarke JP For political and public services in Leeds.
- George Hammond Etherton OBE Clerk to the Lancashire County Council and formerly Town Clerk of Liverpool.
- Henry Head FRCP FRS For public services. Has made distinguished contributions to knowledge of the nervous system.
- Thomas Houston OBE For public services.
- Ebenezer Howard OBE JP President, International Garden Cities and Town Planning Association.
- Charles Hulbert, Chief Master, Chancery Division of the Supreme Court cf Judicature.
- Alfred Joseph Law JP For political and public services in Lancashire.
- Walter Greaves-Lord KC MP Member of Parliament for Norwood since November, 1922. For political and public services.
- Alderman Percy Molyneux JP For political and public services in Wales.
- Harold Spencer Morris MBE KC President of the Industrial Court.
- Charles Kenneth Murchison JP MP Member of Parliament for East Hull December, 1918–22; Huntingdon 1922-23 and since 1924. For political and public services.
- The Right Honourable Thomas Lopdell O'Shaughnessy KC Retired Irish Judge. For public services.
- George Allan Powell CBE Vice-Chairman of the Food Council.
- Joseph Child Priestley KC DL Chairman of the Herts Quarter Sessions. For public services.
- John Charles Walsham Reith, Managing Director of the British Broadcasting Company.
- Thomas Wakelin Saint JP For political and public services. Chairman of the East Islington Conservative Association and has been leader of the Municipal Reform Party in Islington for many years.
- John James Smith. For political and public services in Essex.
- Alexander Spence OBE JP DL President of the Dundee Unionist Association and lately Lord Provost of the City. For political and public services in Dundee.
- Lionel Alexander Goodenough Taylor. For political and public services in Bristol.
- Charles John Howell Thomas CMG Chief Valuer, Board of Inland Revenue
- David Milne-Watson DL Governor of the Gas Light and Coke Company.
- Duncan Watson MIEE JP Chairman of the London and Home Counties Joint Electricity Authority.
- James Watt JP President and formerly Chairman of the Carlisle Conservative Association. For political and public services.
- Walter James Franklin Williamson CMG late Financial Adviser to Siamese Government.

Colonies, Protectorates, etc.

- The Honourable John Bowser, Speaker of the Legislative Assembly, State of Victoria.
- The Honourable Hal Pateshall Colebatch CMG Agent-General in London for the State of Western Australia.
- John Joseph Garvan, formerly Chairman of the Board of Directors of the Commonwealth Bank of Australia.
- Alfred Langler, Governing Director of the West Australian Newspaper Company, in recognition of his services to the Commonwealth of Australia.
- Robert Donald Douglas Maclean, in recognition of his services to the Dominion of New Zealand.
- Maurice Julian Berkeley, Senior Puisne Judge, British Guiana.
- Honorary Colonel Edwin James Hayward CBE VD Unofficial Member of the Legislative Council of Ceylon.
- Joseph Horsford Kemp CBE KC Attorney-General, Hong Kong.
- Albert Ernest Kitson CMG CBE Director of the Geological Survey, Gold Coast Colony.
- Herbert Kortwright McDonnell Sisnett, Chief Justice of British Honduras.

British India

- Joseph Augustus Maung Gyi, Member of the Executive Council of the Governor of Burma.
- Richard Burn CSI Indian Civil Service, lately temporary Member of the Executive Council of the Governor of the United Provinces.
- Justice Cheruvari Krishnan, Diwan Bahadur, Puisne Judge of the High Court of Judicature, Madras.
- John William Anderson Bell, President, Bengal Chamber of Commerce.
- David Thomas Chadwick CSI CIE Indian Civil Service, lately Secretary to the Government of India in the Commerce Department.
- Norman McIver Murray, Managing Governor of the Imperial Bank of India.
- Sardar Bomanji Ardeshir Dalai, Member of the Legislative Assembly, First Class Sardar, Bombay.
- Joseph Aspden Kay, Member of the Bombay Legislative Council, Managing Director, Messrs. W. H. Brady and Company, Limited, Bombay.
- Rao Bahadur Ramanbhai Mahipatram Nilkanth, Bombay.

=== The Most Honourable Order of the Bath ===
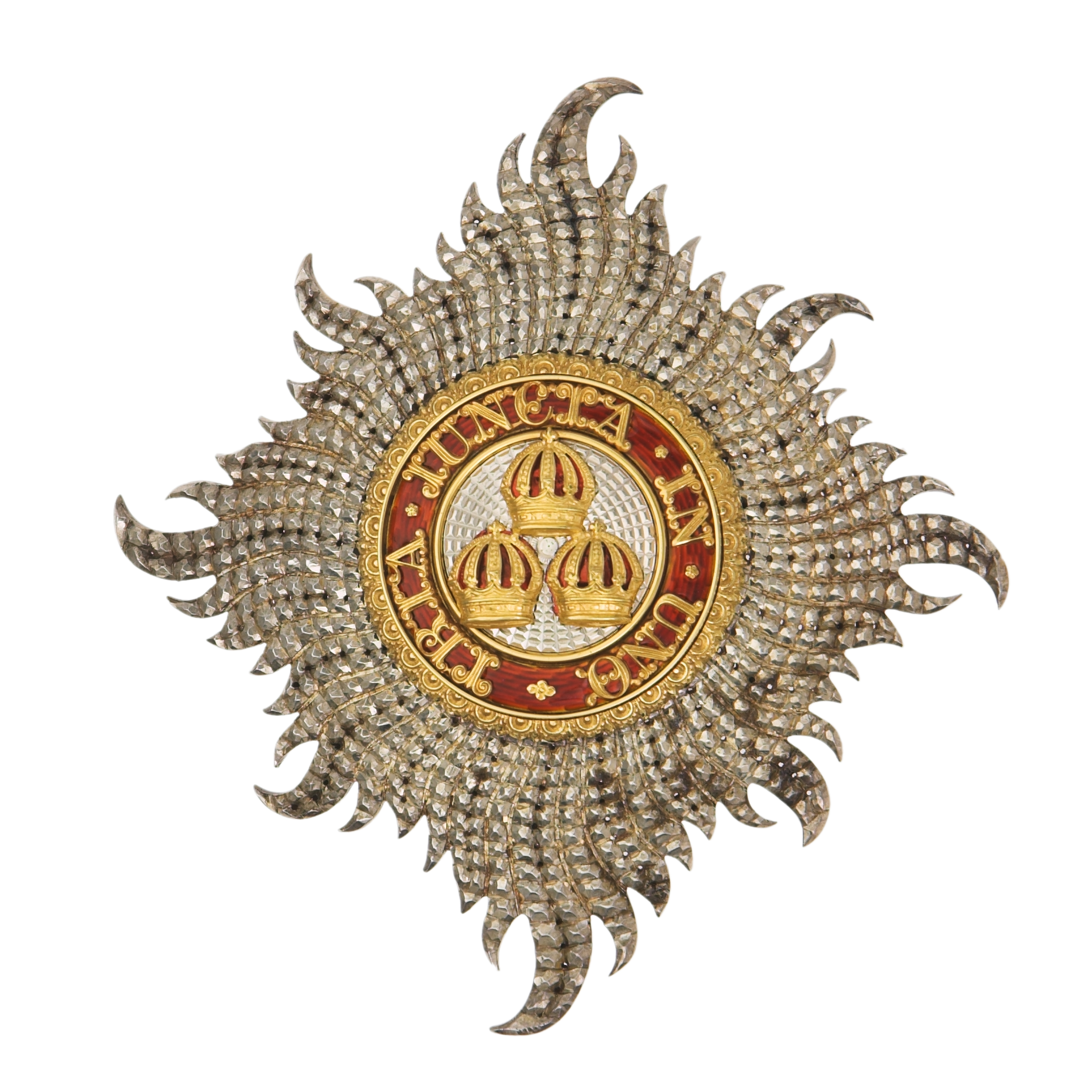
Civil star of the Knight Grand Cross of the Order of the Bath

==== Knight Grand Cross of the Order of the Bath (GCB) ====
Military Division
Army

- General Sir George Francis Milne GCMG KCB DSO ADC General to the King, Colonel Commandant, Royal Artillery, Chief of the Imperial General Staff, The War Office.

Civil Division

- Sir Claud Schuster KCB CVO KC Permanent Secretary to the Lord Chancellor and Clerk of the Crown.

==== Knight Commander of the Order of the Bath (KCB) ====
Military Division
Royal Navy

- Lieutenant General Alexander Richard Hamilton Hutchison CB CMG DSO Royal Marines.

Army

- Lieutenant-General Sir William Thwaites KCMG CB General Officer Command.ing, 47th (2nd London) Division.
- Lieutenant-General Sir Webb Gillman KCMG CB DSO Inspector of the Royal Artillery, The War Office.
- Major-General Harry Christopher Tytler CB CMG CIE DSO Indian Army, General Officer Commanding, Burma Independent District.

Civil Division

- George Macdonald CB FBA Secretary to the Scottish Education Department

==== Companion of the Order of the Bath (CB) ====
Military Division
Royal Navy

- Rear-Admiral William Rawdon Napier CMG DSO
- Rear-Admiral Humphrey Wykeham Bowring DSO
- Engineer Captain Walter Rudolph Parnall RN

Army

- Colonel (Local Colonel on the Staff) Charles Walker Scott CMG CBE DSO Colonel in charge of Administration, Gibraltar.
- Colonel (temporary Colonel Commandant) Evan Gibb CMG CBE DSO Assistant Director of Supplies and Transport, Aldershot Command.
- Colonel (temporary Colonel Commandant) Charles Howard Foulkes CMG DSO Chief Engineer, Aldershot Command.
- Colonel Austin Claude Girdwood CMG DSO Brigade Commander, 158th (Royal Welch) Infantry Brigade.
- Ordnance Officer 1st Class and Colonel Robert Henry McVittie CMG CBE Royal Army Ordnance Corps, Assistant Director of Ordnance Services, The British Troops in Egypt.
- Colonel (temporary Colonel on the Staff) Sydney Capel Peck DSO Director of Artillery, The War Office.
- Colonel Walter Edward Wilson-Johnston CIE CBE DSO Indian Army, General Staff Officer 1st Grade, India Office.
- Colonel (temporary Colonel Commandant) Cyril Rodney Harbord CMG DSO Indian Army, Brigade Commander, 2nd Indian Cavalry Brigade, Sialkot, India.
- Colonel Corrie Hudson CIE DSO FRCSE Indian Medical Service, Assistant Director of Medical Services, Aden Brigade, Aden.

Royal Air Force

- Group Captain Charles Stuart Burnett CBE DSO

Civil Division

- Rear-Admiral Arthur John Davies.
- Instructor Captain Thomas Slator RN
- Commander Kenneth Noel Humphreys RN
- Charles John Tench Bedford Grylls CBE Commissioner and Joint Secretary, H.M. Board of Customs & Excise.
- James Frederick George Price, Principal Assistant Secretary, Ministry of Labour.
- Henry Thomas Tizard AFC FRS Principal Assistant Secretary, Department of Scientific and Industrial Research.

=== The Most Exalted Order of the Star of India ===
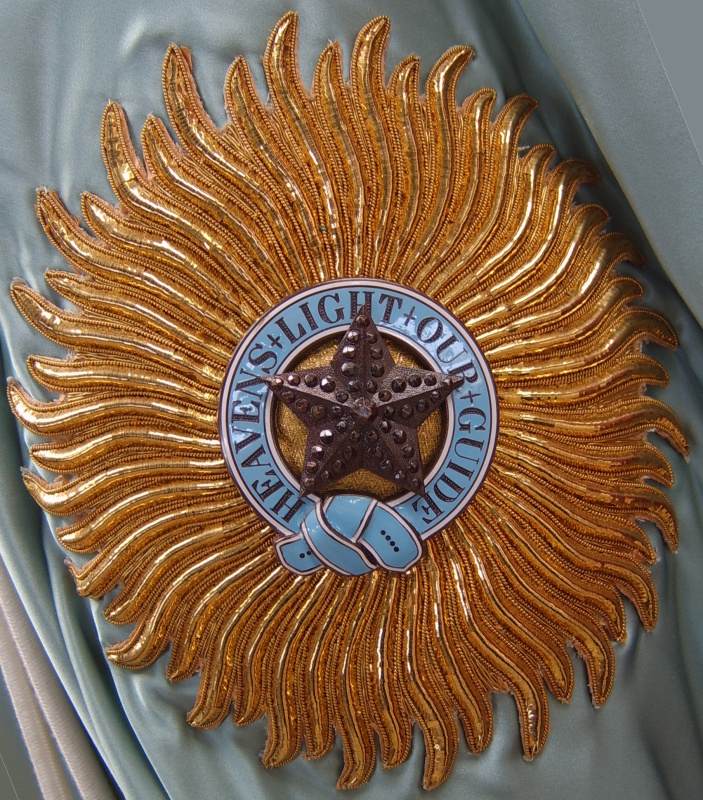
Star of a Knight Grand Commander of the Most Exalted Order of the Star of India.

==== Knight Commander (KCSI) ====
- His Highness Maharaja Gulab Singh Bahadur, Maharaja of Rewa, Central India.

==== Companion (CSI) ====
- Archibald Young Gipps Campbell CIE CBE VD Indian Civil Service, Chief Secretary to Government, Madras.
- Lieutenant-Colonel Stewart Blakeley Agnew Patterson CIE Indian Army, Political Department, Agent to the Governor General in Rajputana.
- John Thomas Marten, Indian Civil Service Member of the Executive Council of the Governor of the Central Provinces.
- Blanchard Foley, Indian Civil Service, Member of the Board of Revenue, Bihar and Orissa.
- Alexander Langley CIE Indian Civil Service, Commission, Lahore, Punjab.

=== The Most Distinguished Order of Saint Michael and Saint George ===
Star of the Order of Saint Michael and Saint George.

==== Knight Grand Cross of the Order of St Michael and St George (GCMG) ====
- Colonel Henry Lawson Webster, Viscount Burnham CH TD President of the Empire Press Union and Deputy Chairman of the Empire Parliamentary Association.
- Sir Laurence Nunns Guillemard KCB KCMG Governor and Commander-in-Chief of the Straits Settlements and their Dependencies; High Commissioner for the Malay States.

Honorary Knight Grand Cross

- His Majesty King Faisal of Iraq.

==== Knight Commander of the Order of St Michael and St George (KCMG) ====
- Professor William Mitchell, Vice-Chancellor of the University of Adelaide, in recognition of his services to the Commonwealth of Australia.
- The Honourable Charles Perrin Skerrett, Chief Justice of New Zealand.
- Alfred Claud Hollis CMG CBE British Resident in Zanzibar.
- Sir William Kellman Chandler Kt CMG Member of the Executive Council and President of the Legislative Council of the Island of Barbados.
- Aretas, Viscount Chilston CMG His Majesty's Envoy Extraordinary and Minister Plenipotentiary at Vienna.
- Robert Henry Clive CMG His Majesty's Envoy Extraordinary and Minister Plenipotentiary at Tehran.
- Miles Wedderburn Lampson CB CMG MVO His Majesty's Envoy Extraordinary and Minister Plenipotentiary at Peking.
- Charles Hubert Montgomery CB CVO Assistant Under-Secretary of State, Foreign Office.

==== Companion of the Order of St Michael and St George (CMG) ====
- John Alexander of the City of Auckland, in recognition of his services to the Dominion of New Zealand.
- Alexander Foulis Bell, a Member of the Dried Fruits Control Board, Commonwealth of Australia.
- Captain Lawrence Franklin Burgis MVO Principal, Offices of the Cabinet.
- Charles John Cerutty, Auditor-General of the Commonwealth of Australia.
- Charles Westwood Earle, President of the New Zealand Newspaper Proprietors' Association.
- Edward Maltby Bland, General Manager of the Nigerian Railway.
- Ernest Frederick Colvile, Provincial Commissioner, Nyasaland Protectorate. Member of the Executive Council and an Official Member of the Legislative Council of the Protectorate.
- Lieutenant-Colonel Charles Henry Fortnom Cox RA DSO Chief British Representative in Trans-Jordan.
- John Pierce Hand MBE Member of the Executive Council and Member of the House of Assembly of Bermuda. represented the Colony at the Trade Conference at Ottawa, 1925.
- Arthur Selborne Jelf, Colonial Secretary of Jamaica.
- Robert Hormus Kotewall Unofficial Member of the Legislative Council of Hong Kong.
- George Nevile Maltby Bland, Private Secretary to the Permanent Under-Secretary of State, Foreign Office.
- William Stanley Edmonds OBE Consul-General attached, with the local rank of First Secretary, to His Majesty's Embassy in Turkey.
- Horace Courtenay Forbes Finlayson, Financial Adviser to His Majesty's Embassy at Berlin.
- Arthur James Croft Huddleston OBE Governor of the Blue Nile Province, Sudan.
- Horace James Seymour, First Secretary at His Majesty's Embassy at Rome.
- George Redston Warner, Counsellor in the Foreign Office.

=== Order of the Indian Empire ===
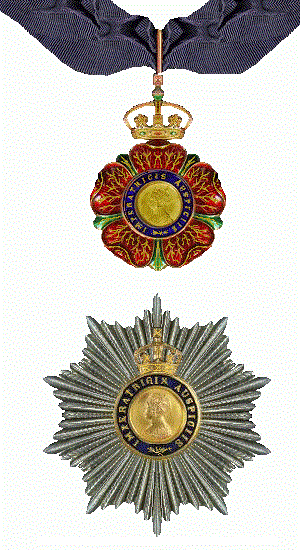
Riband, badge and star of the Knight Grand Commander of the Order of the Indian Empire

==== Knight Commander (KCIE) ====
- William Pell Barton CSI CIE Indian Civil Service, Political Department, Resident at Hyderabad.

==== Companion (CIE) ====
- Howard Denning, Indian Civil Service, Controller of the Currency, Calcutta, Bengal.
- William Browne Brander CBE Indian Civil Service, Chief Secretary to Government, Burma.
- George Washington Hatch, Indian Civil Service, Commissioner, Central Division, Bombay.
- Cecil Upton Wills, Indian Civil Service, Commissioner, Nagpur Division, Central Provinces.
- Herbert Allardyce Lane, Indian Civil Service, Revenue and Judicial Secretary to Government, United Provinces.
- Kaikhosru Sorabji Framji, Acting Chief Engineer and Joint Secretary to Government, Public Works Department, Bombay.
- Colonel William Harry Evans DSO Deputy Chief Engineer, Northern Command.
- George Ernest Fawcus OBE VD Director of Public Instruction, Bihar and Orissa.
- Frank Armitage, Inspector-General of Police, Madras.
- Trevor Claude Simpson, Inspector-General of Police, Bengal.
- Lieutenant-Colonel Alexander Charles Tancock, Indian Army, Inspecting Officer. Frontier Corps, North-West Frontier Province.
- Brevet Lieutenant-Colonel Henry Lawrence Haughton, 11th Sikhs, Commandant, Prince of Wales Royal Indian Military College, Dehra Dun.
- Lieutenant-Colonel Hannath Douglas Marshall OBE VD Aide-de-Camp, Commandant. Surma Valley Light Horse, Silchar, Assam.
- Henry Duncan Graves Law, Indian Civil Service, His. Majesty's Consul at Kerman, Persian Gulf.
- Rupert Willoughby Hanson, Postmaster-General, Madras Circle.
- Hector Russell Wilkinson, Indian Civil Service, Private Secretary to His Excellency the Governor of Bengal.
- Lieutenant-Colonel John Wolfran Cornwall Indian Medical Service, lately Director, Southern India Pasteur Institute, Coonoor, India.
- Rudolph David Anstead, Director of Agriculture, Madras.
- David Milne, Director of Agriculture, Punjab.
- William Roche, Executive Engineer, Public Works Department, United Provinces.
- Rai Biswambhar Rai Bahadur MBE Government Pleader, Krishnagar, Nadia District, Bengal.
- Rai Tara Prasanna Mukharji Bahadur, Pleader, Vice-Chairman of the Burdwan District Board, Bengal.
- Gopal Krishna Devadhar, Vice-President of the Servants of India Society, Bombay.
- Chaudhri Chhaju Ram, of Alakhpura, Hissar District, Punjab.

=== The Royal Victorian Order ===
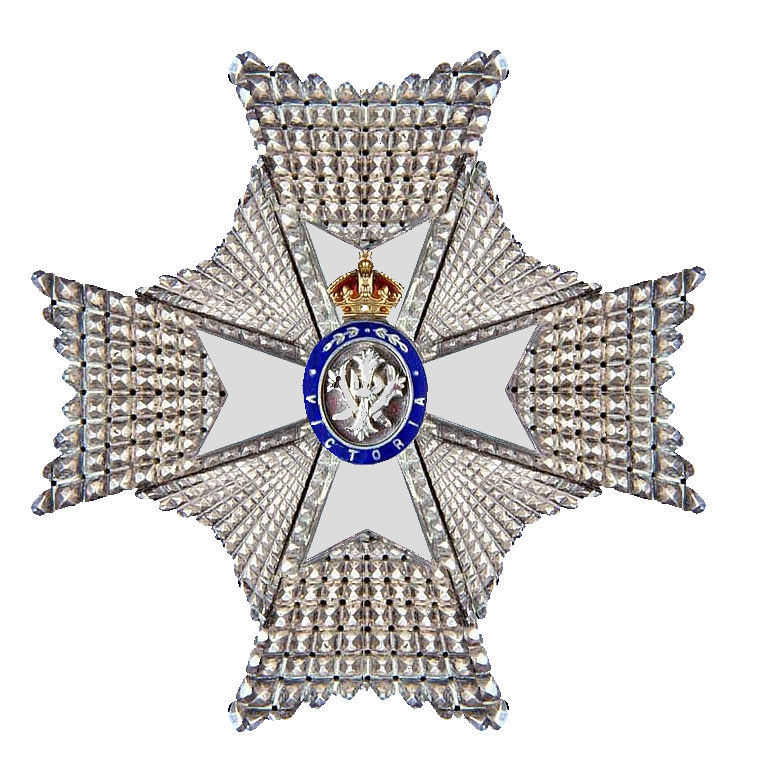
Insignia of a Knight / Dames Commander of the Royal Victorian Order

==== Knight Grand Cross of the Royal Victorian Order (GCVO) ====
- The Right Honourable Rowland Thomas, Earl of Cromer GCIE CVO

==== Knight Commander of the Royal Victorian Order (KCVO) ====
- Colonel Rudolph Robert Basil, Earl of Denbigh CVO
- Sir Arthur Stockdale Cope RA
- Brigadier-General Ernest Frederick Orby Gascoigne CMG DSO
- Captain Ernest Beachcroft Beckwith Towse VC CBE

==== Commander of the Royal Victorian Order (CVO) ====
- Major-General Carteret Walter Carey CBE MVO
- Major Eric Henry Bonham MVO Scots Greys (Retired). (Dated 29 July 1926.)
- The Rev. Canon Ernest Edward Holmes, Archdeacon of London.
- Major Berkeley John Talbot Levett, Scots Guards (Retired). (Dated 12 October 1926.)

==== Member of the Royal Victorian Order, 4th class (MVO) ====
- Paymaster Commander Herbert Martyn Boxer CMG RN (Dated 9 August 1926.)
- John Henry Follows CBE
- Arthur William Heasman OBE
- Lieutenant Walter Douglas Campbell Greenacre, Welsh Guards.
- Lieutenant Commander William Vesey Hamilton Harris, DSO RN (Dated 9 August 1926.)
- Colonel Walter Frederick Kelsey.

==== Member of the Royal Victorian Order, 5th class (MVO) ====
- William Macintosh (Dated 9 September 1926.)
- George Harry Williams

=== The Most Excellent Order of the British Empire ===
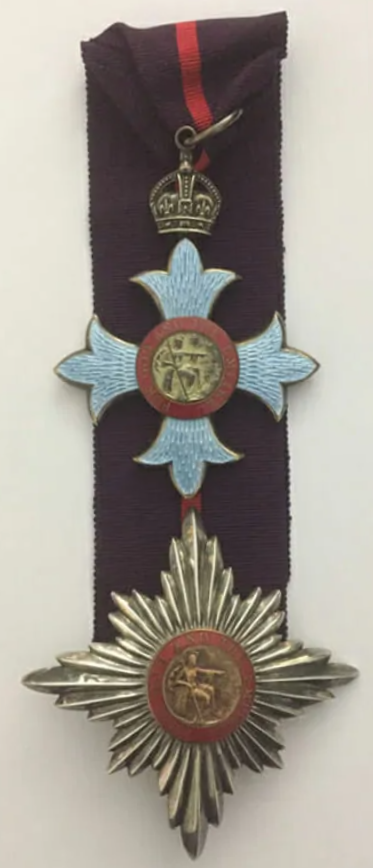
Knight Commander of the Order of the British Empire, insignia 1917–35

==== Dame Commander of the Order of the British Empire (DBE) ====
- Margaret Elizabeth, Dowager Countess of Jersey CBE JP President, Victoria League. For Imperial services.

==== Commander of the Order of the British Empire (CBE) ====
Civil Division

- Sarah Boyce. For political and public services in Surrey.
- Margaret Hardinge Irwin, General Secretary, Scottish Council for Women's Trades.
- Grace Thyrza Kimmins, Founder and Honorary Secretary of the Heritage Craft School for Crippled Children.
- Katharine Janie Stephenson JP Vice-Chairman, Public Health Committee, Wiltshire County Council.
- Eugénie Strong. For services to Archaeology.
- Alice Edith Vlieland. For political and public services in Exeter.
- Anna Elisa Wark, Chief Woman Inspector, Board of Education.

==== Officer of the Order of the British Empire (OBE) ====
Civil Division

- Hilda Maud Milsom, Principal Clerk in His Majesty's Private Secretary's Office.
- Margaret Polson, Superintending Clerk (acting), Ministry of Health.

=== Members of the Order of the Companions of Honour (CH) ===
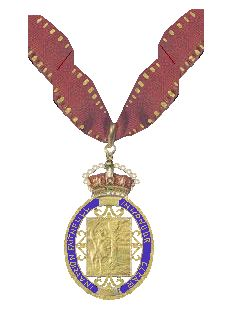
The riband and badge of the "Companions of Honour"

- The Reverend Hugh Richard Lawrie Sheppard Honorary Chaplain to The King and lately Vicar of St Martins-in-the-Fields.

=== Kaisar-i-Hind Medal ===
First Class

- Lenna Mary Stratford MBE Deputy Directress of Public Instruction, Punjab.
- The Reverend William Herbert Greenland Padfield, Principal and Secretary, Lawrence Memorial Royal Military School, Lovedale, Madras.
- The Reverend John Harvey Hickinbotham, Missionary, Principal, King Edward School, Chapra, Krishnanagar, Bengal.
- The Reverend William Edwin Lant, Superintendent of the Leper Home and Hospital at Dichpalli, Hyderabad.
- Rose Harvey, Superintendent of the Nasik Leper Asylum, Bombay.
- Henry Campbell Guyer, Principal, Church Mission School, Dera Ismail Khan, North-West Frontier Province
- The Reverend Edward Charles Stephens, Honorary Secretary, Strangers Home for Asiatics, London.
- Frances Whipham, Missionary, Bihar and Orissa.
- Helen Dorothea Jerwood, Missionary, Cambridge Mission, Delhi.
- Parvati Ammal Chandirasekhara Aiyar, Mysore.

=== Air Force Cross ===
- Flight Lieutenant Louis Massey Hilton DFC
- Flight Lieutenant Matthew Crawford Dick.

=== Air Force Medal ===
- Sergeant (Pilot) Herbert Myles.
- Corporal Arthur East
- Leading Aircraftman Robert Edward Barton.
- Leading Aircraftman Stanley George Wright.

=== King's Police Medal (KPM) ===
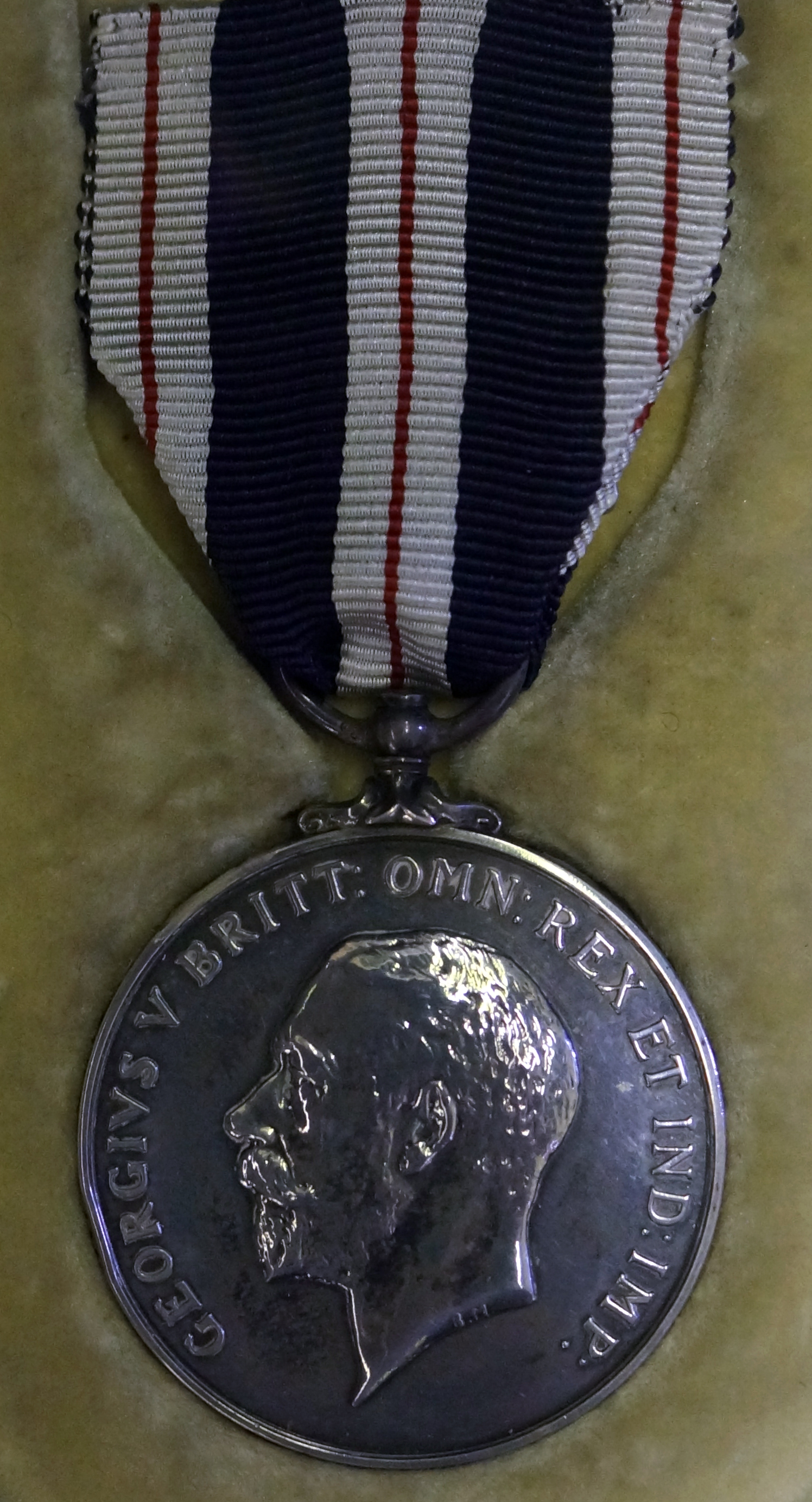
King's Police Medal with the riband for gallantry

England and Wales

- James Billings OBE Chief Constable, Metropolitan Police.
- Robert Yarnell Davies MBE Chief Constable of Flint.
- Lieutenant-Colonel Henry William Madoc CBE MVO Chief Constable of the Isle of Man.
- James Arthur Wilson OBE Chief Constable, Cardiff City Police.
- James Main Garrow, Assistant Chief Constable, Derbyshire Constabulary.
- Arthur Fowler Neil, Superintendent, Metropolitan Police.
- Alfred John Minty, Superintendent, West Riding Constabulary.
- Henry Tebbey, Superintendent, Northampton.shire Constabulary.
- Levi Bowley, Superintendent and Deputy Chief Constable, Leicestershire Constabulary.
- Ralph John Smith MBE Superintendent and Deputy Chief Constable, Nottinghamshire Constabulary.
- John Hernaman Boulton MBE Chief Superintendent, Birmingham City Police.
- Frederick Joseph Dewen, Superintendent, Hull City Police.
- Thomas Herbert Wardle, Sergeant, Lancashire Constabulary.
- Wallace Wood, Constable, Metropolitan Police.
- Alfred Green. Constable, Metropolitan Police.
- Alexander Cunningham, Constable, Metropolitan Police.
- Leslie Lyddon, Constables Metropolitan Police.
- Christopher Jones, Constable, Metropolitan Police.
- George Thompson Cockill, Constable, Leeds City Police.
- Cyril MacLachlan, Constable, Manchester City Police.
- George Rigby Southern, Constable, Manchester City Police.
- George Creamer, Constable, Durham Constabulary.
- William. James, Constable, Lancashire Constabulary.
- Samuel Pope, Constable, Boston Borough Police.
- John Jones, Sergeant, Wigan Borough Police Fire Brigade (For a Bar to the Kings Police Medal.)
- Albert Victor Armstrong, Sub-Officer. London Fire Brigade.
- Willie Rylance, Inspector, Wigan Borough Police Fire Brigade.
- John Farmery MBE Superintendent, Ilford Fire Brigade.
- John Richard Exall, Second Officer, West Ham Fire Brigade.

Scotland

- Auchterlonie Williamson, Assistant Chief Constable, Glasgow City Police.
- John Forbes, Superintendent, Glasgow City Police.
- James Dick Gracie, Superintendent, Lanark County Police.

Northern Ireland

- George Storey, Head Constable, Royal Ulster Constabulary, Belfast.
- William Robert Coulson, Sergeant, Royal Ulster Constabulary, Co. Down.

Australia

- Thomas Pierce Hains Nance, Deputy Chief Officer, Board of Fire Commissioners, New South Wales.

Union of South Africa

- Hermanus Christiaan Bredell, Deputy Commissioner, South African Police.
- John James McRae, Inspector, South African Police.
- Peter Villet, First Class Detective Sergeant, South African Police.
- Pieter Blomerus Phillipus Fourie, First Class Constable, South African Police.

British India

- Rao Bahadur Kanthadaa Rangaswami Ayyangar, Temporary Deputy Superintendent, Madras Police. (For a Bar to the Kings Police Medal.)
- Shanmukham Pillai Duraiswami Pillai, Sub-Inspector, Madras Police. (For a Bar to the Kings Police Medal.)
- Frederick Sayers, Superintendent, Madras Police.
- Kuvalavalli South Rajagopala Ayyangar, Acting Deputy Superintendent, Madras Police.
- Codanda Mediah Biddiah, Inspector, Madras Police.
- Baburao Ramchandra Ashtekar, Sub-Inspector, Bombay Police.
- Khamiso, Mounted Police Constable, Acting Head Constable, Bombay Police.
- Khan Bahadur Abdul Rashid Khan, District Superintendent, Bombay Police.
- Satyendra Nath Mukerjee, Sub-Inspector, Calcutta Police.
- Robin Neil, Sergeant, Calcutta Police.
- George John Adamson, Sergeant, Calcutta Police.
- David Fisher, Assistant Commissioner, Calcutta Police.
- Frank Austin Tucker, Station Officer, Calcutta Fire Brigade.
- Eric Prideaux Mclntosh MC Superintendent, United Provinces Police.
- Thakur Raghunath Singh, Sub-Inspector, United Provinces Police.
- Allah Rakha, Head Constable, Punjab Police.
- Geoffrey Bernard Sandeman Prance, Officiating Superintendent, Punjab Police.
- Dawindar Singh, Sub-Inspector, Punjab Police.
- Pir Nabi Shah, Sub-Inspector, Punjab Police.
- Captain Alleyn Cardwell Moore Assistant Commandant, Burma Military Police.
- Havildar Shuan Kam, Burma Military Police.
- Havildar Budhiman Thapa IOM Burma Military Police.
- Lieutenant-Colonel Roderick William MacDonald DSO Inspector General, Burma Police.
- Matthew Spencer Merrikin, Officiating Deputy Inspector General, Burma Police.
- Daniel David, Officiating Superintendent, Burma Police.
- U Maung Gale (1), Superintendent, Burma Police.
- William Surridge Hitchcock, Superintendent, Bihar and Orissa Police.
- Maulavi Shah Anisur Rahman, Probationary Sub-Inspector, Bihar and Orissa Police.
- Bam Kishun Thakur, Constable, Bihar and Orissa Police.
- Chammdass, Constable, Central Provinces Police.
- Tarachand, Inspector, Central Provinces Police.
- Rai Sahib Surendra Nath Sen, Inspector, Officiating Deputy Superintendent, Assam Police.
- Thomas Andrew, North West Frontier Province Police.
- Denis Brownell Murphy, Assistant Superintendent, North West Frontier Province Police.
- Mohammad Bakhsh, Foot Constable, North West Frontier Province Police.
- Agha Mirza Jan, Sub-Inspector, Baluchistan Police.
- Archibald John O'Connor, Superintendent, Baluchistan Police.
- Sardar Bahadur Tara Chand, Inspector General, Patiala State Police.

Colonies, Protectorates and Mandated Territories

- Richard Charles Alexander Cavendish, Commissioner of Police, Nigeria.
- George William Richardson, Quartermaster, Kenya Police.
- Major Francis Trent Stephens OBE MC Chief Commissioner of Police, Nyasaland Protectorate.
- Jese, Constable, Fiji Constabulary.
- Kok Ah Soo, Detective Police Constable, Straits Settlements.
- Chong Soo, Detective Police Constable, Straits Settlements.
- Hong Ah Heng, Detective Police Constable, Straits Settlements.
- Hernam Singh, Sergeant, Federated Malay States Police.
- Wahat bin Salim, Lance Sergeant, Federated Malay States Police.
- Charles Hannigan, Commissioner of Police, Federated Malay States.

=== Royal Red Cross (RRC) ===
First Class

- Mary Wilson Campbell, late Matron, Princess Mary's Royal Air Force Nursing Service, in recognition of the exceptional devotion and competency displayed by her in the nursing and care of the sick in Air Force Hospitals at Home and in Iraq.
