= Rycroft =

Rycroft may refer to:

== People ==
- Al Rycroft (born 1950), Canadian ice hockey player
- Carter Rycroft (born 1977), Canadian curler
- Charles Rycroft (businessman) (1901–1998), British businessman and philanthropist
- Charles Rycroft (1914–1998), British psychologist and writer
- Leanne Rycroft (born 1969), Australian gymnast
- Mark Rycroft (born 1978), Canadian ice hockey player
- Martin Rycroft (born 1983), Welsh pop singer
- Matthew Rycroft (born 1968), British diplomat
- Melissa Rycroft (born 1983), American reality television star
- Michael Rycroft (born 1938), British ionospheric physicist
- Philip Rycroft (born 1961), British civil servant
- Richard Rycroft (born 1960), English actor and comedian
- William Rycroft (1861–1925), British army general and colonial governor
- Rycroft baronets in the Baronetcy of Great Britain

== Places ==
- Rycroft, Alberta, a village in northern Alberta, Canada

== See also ==
- Ryecroft (disambiguation)
- Roycroft
