= Beck House, Giggleswick =

House in Giggleswick, North Yorkshire, England

Coordinates: 54°04′17″N 2°17′28″W

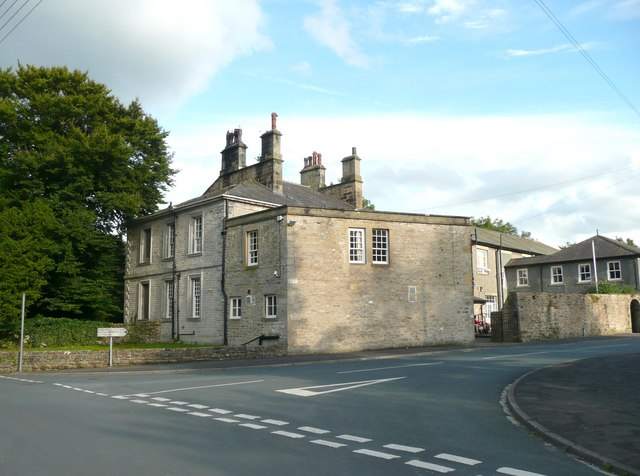
The house, in 2008

Beck House is a historic building in Giggleswick, a village in North Yorkshire, in England.

The house was probably built by Charles Nowell in the 1720s, and was originally named Beck Hall. It was altered in the early 19th century, and was extended to the left in the 1930s. It was grade II* listed in 1958, but R. W. Hoyle in 2019 argued that it has been "largely overlooked by local and architectural historians". It is currently used as part of Giggleswick School.

The house is built of stone with limestone dressings, chamfered quoins, a floor band, a moulded eaves cornice, and a slate roof. It has two storeys and a front of seven bays, the middle three bays projecting under a large segmental pediment containing three windows, the outer windows round. In the centre is a doorway with an eared architrave, a rectangular fanlight, a pulvinated frieze with carvings, and a segmental pediment on consoles. The flanking windows each has a moulded architrave, a pulvinated frieze and a broken pediment, and the windows in the upper floor have triangular pediments; all the windows are sashes, and those on the ground floor are early 18th century. To the left is the 1930s extension with two storeys and seven bays. Inside, there is an early-18th century fireplace in the kitchen, and an 18th-century servants' staircase, while the main staircase is early-19th century.

== See also ==
- Grade II* listed buildings in North Yorkshire (district)
- Listed buildings in Giggleswick
