= Charles Mott =

Charles Mott may refer to:

- Charles Francis Mott (1877–1967), English physicist and educator
- Charles Mott (baritone) (1880–1918), English baritone
- Charles Stewart Mott (1875–1973), American businessman
- Charles T. Mott, architect in the United States
