= Stackhouse, North Yorkshire =

Hamlet in North Yorkshire, England

Coordinates: 54.084°N 2.284°W

Stackhouse
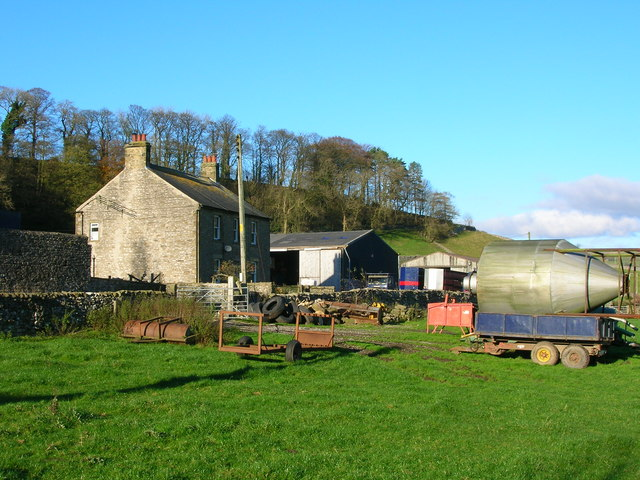
- Farm at Stackhouse

- Location within North Yorkshire
- OS grid reference: SD814654
- Civil parish: Giggleswick
- Unitary authority: North Yorkshire
- Ceremonial county: North Yorkshire
- Region: Yorkshire and the Humber
- Country: England
- Sovereign state: United Kingdom
- Post town: SETTLE
- Postcode district: BD24
- Police: North Yorkshire
- Fire: North Yorkshire
- Ambulance: Yorkshire

Stackhouse (sometimes written as Stack House), is a hamlet in the civil parish of Giggleswick on the western bank of the River Ribble in North Yorkshire, England.

== History ==
Stackhouse lies on the western side of the River Ribble in north Ribblesdale, opposite Langcliffe, and 1.2 miles (2 km) north of Giggleswick. The hamlet is located on the road from Settle to Helwith Bridge via Knight Stainforth. The hamlet is mentioned in the Domesday Book as belonging to Roger de Poitu, though with no resident population. The hamlet was listed as having nearly 400 acres (160 ha), and later came under the possession of Furness Abbey c. 1175. The hamlet has been recorded across the centuries as: Stacuse (1086), Stachus (1285), Stacho(u)ssum, Stakho(u)ssum (1150–70), and Stackhowse (1592). The name derives from Old Norse meaning "the house near, or for, ricks." Sometimes the hamlet's name is written out as Stack House.

The hamlet was previously in the Township of Giggleswick (along with another hamlet called Rome), and in the wapentake of Staincliffe in the West Riding of Yorkshire. The hamlet is now in the civil parish of Giggleswick, in North Yorkshire. From 1974 to 2023 it was part of the Craven District, it is now administered by the unitary North Yorkshire Council.

James Carr, who came from the hamlet, was a priest at the church in Giggleswick (St Alkelda) and also later founded Giggleswick School. Some of the houses in the village were built for the cotton workers of Langcliffe Mill (opened in 1783) on the opposite bank of the river to Stackhouse, but connected by a bridge.

Both the Ribble Way and Dales High Way long-distance paths run through the hamlet. The village is also on National Cycle Route 68 (The Pennine Cycleway). A footbridge connects the hamlet over the Ribble with Langcliffe on the eastern bank. The footbridge was swept away in a storm of 1953, but was replaced soon afterwards. To the north west of the village, following the route of the footpath to Feizor, several Bronze Age ring cairns are located on the moor. One was excavated in the 19th century revealing human bones and ivory discs.

== See also ==
- Listed buildings in Giggleswick
