= 1927 New Year Honours (New Zealand) =

Annual awards for New Zealanders

The 1927 New Year Honours in New Zealand were appointments by King George V on the advice of the New Zealand government to various orders and honours to reward and highlight good works by New Zealanders. The awards celebrated the passing of 1926 and the beginning of 1927, and were announced on 1 January 1927.

The recipients of honours are displayed here as they were styled before their new honour.

== Knight Bachelor ==
- Robert Donald Douglas Maclean – of Hawke's Bay. In recognition of his services to New Zealand.
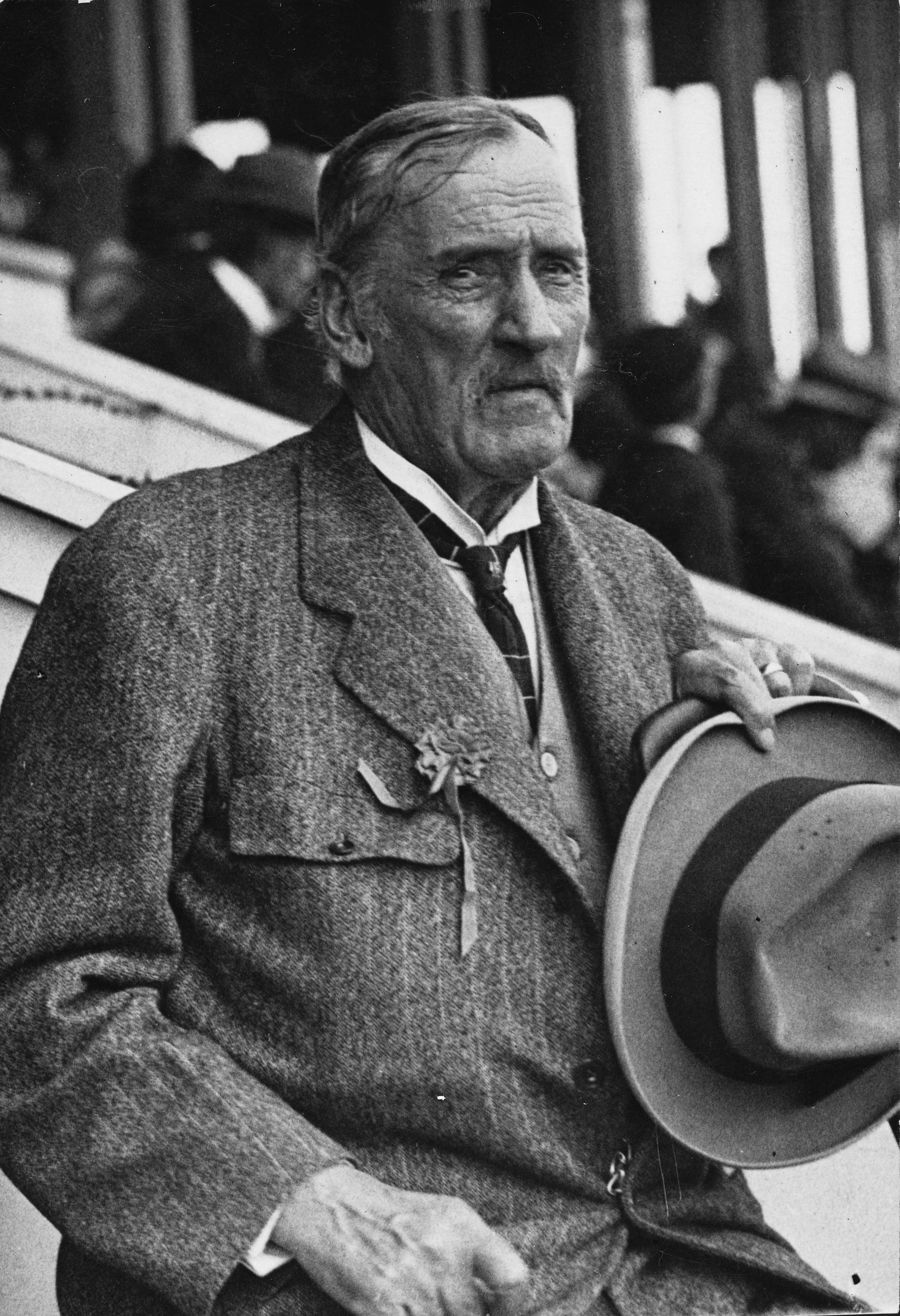
Sir Douglas Maclean

== Order of Saint Michael and Saint George ==
=== Knight Commander (KCMG) ===
- The Honourable Charles Perrin Skerrett KC – chief justice.
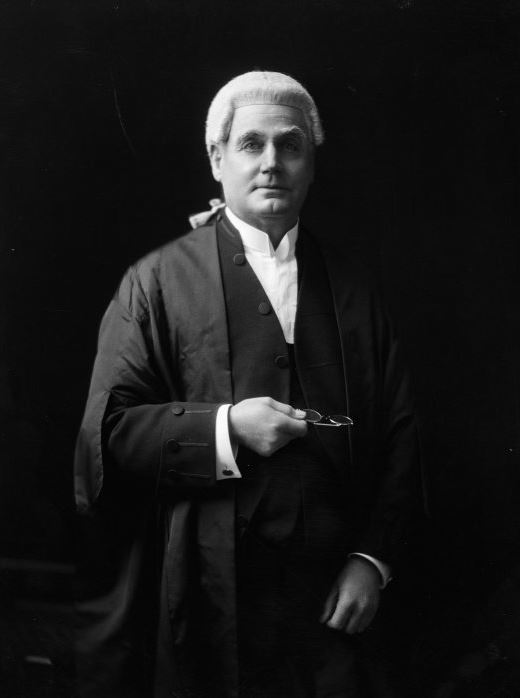
Sir Charles Skerrett

=== Companion (CMG) ===
- John Alexander – of Auckland. In recognition of his services to New Zealand.
- Charles Westwood Earle – of Wellington; president of the New Zealand Newspaper Proprietors' Association.
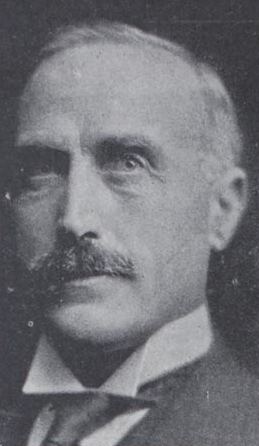
John Alexander

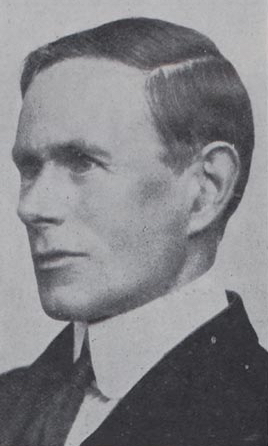
Charles Earle
