= Listed buildings in Giggleswick =

Giggleswick is a civil parish in the county of North Yorkshire, England. It contains 55 listed buildings that are recorded in the National Heritage List for England. Of these, one is listed at Grade I, the highest of the three grades, four are at Grade II*, the middle grade, and the others are at Grade II, the lowest grade. The parish contains the villages of Giggleswick and Stackhouse, and the surrounding countryside. A major institution in the parish is Giggleswick School, and a number of school buildings and associated structures are listed. Most of the other listed buildings consist of houses, cottages and associated structures, farmhouses and farm buildings. The remainder include a church, a market cross, a bridge, and two boundary stones.

== Key ==
Grade	Criteria
I	Buildings of exceptional interest, sometimes considered to be internationally important
II*	Particularly important buildings of more than special interest
II	Buildings of national importance and special interest

== Buildings ==
Name and location	Photograph	Date	Notes	Grade
St Alkelda's Church; 54.07235°N 2.28961°W		Late 14th to early 15th century	The church has been extended and altered through the centuries, the tower dates from the mid-15th century and the church was restored in 1890–92 by Paley and Austin. It is built in stone, it has roofs of stone slate and lead, and is in Perpendicular style. The church consists of a nave with a clerestory, north and south aisles, a south porch, north and south chapels, a chancel and a west tower. The tower has three stages, diagonal buttresses, and a stair turret on the south side. It contains a west doorway with a basket arch and a hood mould, above which is a three-light window, a string course, a single-light window, two-light bell openings with chamfered surrounds, a clock face on the east side, gargoyles, and an embattled parapet with crocketed corner pinnacles.	I
Market Cross; 54.07206°N 2.28884°W		c. 1400	The market cross, which was moved to its present site in 1840, is in millstone grit, and is about 2.4 metres (7 ft 10 in) high. It has a square base of three steps, a chamfered shaft, and a head in the form of trefoiled Greek cross with a pierced centre.	II
1 Belle Hill; 54.07217°N 2.28740°W		Mid 17th century	The house is rendered, with stone dressings, a stone slate roof, two storeys and three bays. The doorway has a plain surround, and the windows are casements. The window to the left of the doorway has three lights and double-chamfered moulded mullions.	II
Armitstead Farmhouse, wall and farm buildings 54.07909°N 2.32996°W		17th century	The farmhouse is in stone, with quoins, a sill band, shaped eaves modillions, and a stone slate roof with gable copings and kneelers. There are two storeys and three bays, the middle bay projecting under a pediment. The central doorway has a round-arched head and four Doric pilasters, and is in a pedimented surround. The windows on the front are tripartite sashes with mullions. In the left return is a tall round-headed stair window, and at the rear is an outshut with a catslide root. Attached to the house is a garden wall, and on the right is a 14-bay range of farm buildings containing four entrances with chamfered surrounds and basket-arched lintels.	II
Close House Cottage; 54.06575°N 2.30596°W	—	17th century	The farmhouse, which dates mainly from the 19th century, is rendered, with stone dressings and a slate roof. There are two storeys and four bays. The doorway has a 17th-century surround, a rectangular fanlight, and a decorated, dated and initialled lintel. The windows are sashes with plain surrounds, and there are three dormers. Inside, there is an inglenook fireplace.	II
Cravendale; 54.07200°N 2.28820°W	—	Mid 17th century	A public house, later a private house, in stone with a stone slate roof, two storeys and two bays. The central doorway has a plain surround, to its right is a sash window with a moulded surround, and the other windows are mullioned with casements. All the windows have timber hood moulds.	II
Barn adjoining Field Gate Farmhouse; 54.06321°N 2.31319°W	—	17th century	The barn is in stone with a slate roof and three bays. It contains a wagon entrance with a chamfered surround and a basket-arched head, and there are two more entrances with chamfered surrounds. The hayloft entrance has brick jambs.	II
Ivy Fold; 54.07223°N 2.29032°W	—	Mid 17th century	A vicarage, later three houses, in stone with a stone slate roof and two storeys. There is an L-shaped plan, with a left wing of two bays, and a right wing of three bays. The windows have chamfered surrounds and mullions, and some have hood moulds. Both wings contain a doorway with a moulded surround and a segmental-arched decorated, dated and initialled lintel.	II*
Stable and barns west of Far Rome Farmhouse; 54.05967°N 2.32223°W	—	17th century	A range of stables and three barns in stone with a slate roof. The stables have an entrance with a dated and initialled chamfered surround, and the barns have three entrances, one with a chamfered surround and an initialled datestone. External steps lead up to a hayloft.	II
Low Paley Green; 54.07468°N 2.32076°W	—	17th century	The farmhouse is in stone with a stone slate roof. There are two storeys, three bays, and a double depth plan. The central doorway has a moulded surround, and a lintel with a keystone. To the right of the doorway is a two-light mullioned window, and the other windows are sashes.	II
Parish room 54.07113°N 2.28751°W	—	17th century	The building is in stone with a slate roof, two storeys and four bays. On the front are two sash windows, and the other windows are double-chamfered and mullioned with casements. The ground floor windows have hood moulds.	II
Routster Farmhouse; 54.06399°N 2.35492°W	—	17th century	The farmhouse is in stone with painted stone dressings and a stone slate roof. There are two storeys and two bays. The doorway has a plain surround, and the windows are chamfered and mullioned, containing a mix of casements and sashes.	II
Settle Bridge; 54.07248°N 2.28187°W		17th century (probable)	The bridge, which was widened on the downstream side in the later 18th century, carries the B6480 road over the River Ribble. It is in stone and consists of two elliptical arches. The bridge has four ribs on the upstream side of each arch, chamfered at the base, and a cutwater, also on the upstream side.	II*
Barn adjoining Carrholme Cottage; 54.08538°N 2.28620°W	—	1664	The barn is in stone with a corrugated asbestos roof. There are two storeys and four bays. It contains a wagon entrance with a chamfered surround and an initialled and dated keystone. To the left is an entrance with a chamfered surround and a basket-arched lintel, and in the upper floor is a square chamfered pitching hole.	II
Carrholme; 54.08575°N 2.28642°W	—	1669	The house is in stone, with painted stone dressings, and a stone slate roof with decorated bargeboards. There are two storeys and five bays. In the centre is a two-storey gabled porch, the entrance in the right return with a moulded surround, a segmental-pointed head and a hood mould. Above it is an initialled datestone. Most of the windows are mullioned, some with hood moulds. On the front is a painted sundial with an iron gnomon. Inside, there is an inglenook fireplace with a basket arch.	II
Garstang; 54.07205°N 2.28809°W	—	Late 17th century	Part of an inn, later a private house, in stone, with a slate roof, two storeys and two bays. To the left is a doorway with an eared architrave, and in the centre is a former carriage entrance, now partly blocked and containing a window. Most of the windows are mullioned with hood moulds containing sashes or casements, and there are small blocked windows.	II
Higher Wham; 54.05783°N 2.34675°W	—	Late 17th century	A farmhouse, later an outbuilding, in stone, with a slate roof, two storeys and two bays. In the centre is an entrance with a chamfered surround and a flat-arched lintel. The ground floor contains windows with chamfered surrounds, the mullions missing, with sashes or fixed lights. In the upper floor are blocked windows, one forming a hayloft entrance.	II
Tems Cottage; 54.06981°N 2.29041°W	—	Late 17th century	The cottage is in limewashed stone with painted stone dressings and a stone slate roof. There are two storeys and three bays. The doorway has plain jambs on square bases and impost bands. To the left of the doorway are sash windows, and the other windows are mullioned, one in the top floor with a round-headed central light.	II
Browns Croft; 54.08644°N 2.28486°W	—	1682	A stone cottage with a stone slate roof, two storeys and four bays. The doorway has a moulded surround, and a decorated dated and initialled lintel. The windows either have fixed lights or casements with mullions, and some have hood moulds.	II
Field Gate Farmhouse; 54.06324°N 2.31303°W	—	1684	The farmhouse is in stone with painted stone dressings and a stone slate roof. There are two storeys and three bays. The doorway has a moulded surround, and a decorated, dated and initialled lintel. The windows are casements with chamfered surrounds, the mullions are missing, and one window has a hood mould. The rear, facing the lane, contains a doorway with a chamfered surround and a decorated lintel, and a small single-light window with a trefoil head.	II
Barns south of Clare House Cottage; 54.06542°N 2.30575°W		1688	The two barns are in stone. The right barn is the older, and has a stone slate roof and three bays. It contains an entrance with a chamfered surround, and a basket arch with voussoirs, above which is an initialled datestone. To the left is a blocked entrance with a chamfered surround and a decorated lintel, and above are two hayloft entrance and vents. The left barn dates from the 19th century, and has a slate roof and five bays. The porch contains a re-set lintel, and the openings have chamfered surrounds.	II
4, 6 and 8 Church Street; 54.07198°N 2.28840°W		1689	A house, later divided into three cottages, in limewashed stone, with painted stone dressings, a slate roof, two storeys and five bays. The original doorway has a chamfered surround, and a decorated, dated and initialled lintel, and the other two doorways date from the 20th century. The windows either have fixed lights or are casements with chamfered or moulded mullions. Some ground floor windows have hood moulds, and there is a continuous stepped hood mould over the original doorway and the windows to the right.	II
Far Rome Farmhouse; 54.05953°N 2.32173°W		1690	The farmhouse is in stone on a plinth, with a stone slate roof. There are two storeys and five bays, and a rear outshut. The doorway has a chamfered surround and a decorated dated and initialled lintel. Most of the windows are chamfered and mullioned, and over the ground floor windows is a continuous hood mould. Inside the house is an inglenook fireplace.	II
Sutcliffe House; 54.07214°N 2.28704°W	—	1693	The house is in stone with painted stone dressings and a stone slate roof. There are two storeys and an L-shaped plan, with a front range of five bays and a rear wing on the right. The doorway has a chamfered surround and a decorated, initialled and dated lintel. The windows are chamfered with mullions, some of which are moulded.	II
The Old Hall; 54.08616°N 2.28515°W	—	1695	The house is rendered, and has painted stone dressings and a slate roof. There are two storeys and three bays. On the front is a gabled porch that has an entrance with a chamfered surround, and a decorated dated and initialled lintel. Above this is a sash window with a moulded surround, a shield and a lancet window in the gable, which has bargeboards. There are sash windows elsewhere, some with mullions, and in the right gable end is an oculus.	II
Brookside; 54.07184°N 2.29206°W	—	1703	Two cottages, later used for other purposes, in stone, with eaves modillions and a slate roof. There are two storeys, a main range of three bays, and a slightly recessed three-bay wing to the left. The doorway in the centre of the main range has a plain surround on square blocks, and above it is an initialled datestone. Immediately to the left are the remains of a blocked round-headed window and a decorated lintel. To the right of the doorway is a 20th-century casement window, and the other windows are chamfered and mullioned.	II
Armistead House; 54.07024°N 2.28985°W		1707	The house, later divided into three, is in limewashed stone, and has a stone slate roof with kneelers. There are three storeys, and a U-shaped plan, with a front range of five bays, and two short rear wings. The original doorway has a moulded surround, and a decorated dated and initialled lintel. There is a later copy to the left, and above both is a continuous hood mould. Most of the windows are sashes, some are casements, and the original mullions and transoms are missing. At the rear are external steps to an entrance in the middle floor.	II
Rose Cottage; 54.07167°N 2.28806°W	—	1718	The house is in stone with painted stone dressings and a slate roof. There are two storeys and four bays. The doorway has a chamfered surround and a decorated dated and initialled lintel. The windows are chamfered and mullioned, and contain casements and fixed lights, those in the ground floor with hood moulds.	II
Beck House; 54.07148°N 2.29118°W		Early 18th century	The house, later used for other purposes, is in stone with limestone dressings, chamfered quoins, a floor band, a moulded eaves cornice, and a slate roof. There are two storeys and a front of seven bays, the middle three bays projecting under a large segmental pediment containing three windows, the outer windows round. In the centre is a doorway with an eared architrave, a rectangular fanlight, a pulvinated frieze with carvings, and a segmental pediment on consoles. The flanking windows each has a moulded architrave, a pulvinated frieze and a broken pediment, and the windows in the upper floor have triangular pediments; all the windows are sashes. To the left is a later extension with two storeys and seven bays.	II*
Catteral Hall; 54.07449°N 2.29275°W	—	Early 18th century	A house, later extended and used for other purposes, in stone, with quoins, eaves modillions, overhanging eaves on the right, and a slate roof with massive kneelers and finial bases. There are two storeys, and an entrance front of five bays. The projecting porch is gabled and contains an entrance with a four-centred arch and a chamfered surround, and above it is a hood mould, an initialled datestone, and a blank shield in the gable. The windows are sashes with various surrounds, and at the rear is a low tower with a pyramidal roof.	II
Abbeylands; 54.08583°N 2.28553°W	—	18th century	The front block was added to the house in about 1840. The house is in stone with floor bands and an eaves course. There are two storeys and five bays. The central doorway has engaged Tuscan columns, a round-headed fanlight, and an open pediment, and the windows are sashes.	II
Bankwell; 54.07097°N 2.28760°W		18th century	The house dates mainly from about 1830, and is in stone with a hipped slate roof. There are two storeys, a double depth plan, and a front of three bays. The porch has Tuscan pilasters and an entablature, and the recessed doorway has a moulded surround and a rectangular fanlight. The left return has four bays, the middle two recessed, and a floor band. The windows in both fronts are sashes.	II
Greystones; 54.07211°N 2.28752°W		Mid 18th century	The house is in stone with a stone slate roof, two storeys and two bays. The doorway on the right has a plain surround on square bases. The windows are sashes with plain surrounds on the front, and moulded surrounds at the rear.	II
Smithy Cottage; 54.07190°N 2.28765°W	—	Mid 18th century	The cottage is rendered, with painted stone dressings, chamfered quoins, moulded eaves modillions, and a stone slate roof. There are two storeys and two bays. In the right bay is a doorway with a moulded surround and a segmental-arched extrados, and above it is a 20th-century window. The windows in the left bay are sashes with moulded surrounds, the window in the ground floor with a mullion. Inside, there is a segmental-arched inglenook fireplace.	II
Queen's Rock, railings, wall and gate 54.07063°N 2.28735°W		Late 18th century	The house is in stone with painted stone dressings, shaped eaves modillions, and a stone slate roof with gable copings and kneelers. There are two storeys and three bays. In the centre is a trellis porch with a slate roof, and a doorway with a basket-arched lintel. Above the doorway is a single-light window, and the other windows are two-light mullioned sashes. In front, the garden is enclosed by a wall with railings and a gate in Regency style.	II
Stackhouse; 54.08485°N 2.28657°W	—	Late 18th century	The house is in stone, with shaped eaves modillions, and a stone slate roof with gable copings and kneelers. There are two storeys and three bays. The central doorway has a plain surround on square bases, and above it is a single-light sash window. In the outer bays are two-light mullioned sash windows.	II
Swawbeck Farmhouse; 54.06101°N 2.30516°W	—	Late 18th century	The farmhouse is in stone with painted stone dressings and a stone slate roof. There are two storeys and three bays, and the rear faces the road. In the centre of the front is a porch and a doorway with a plain surround, above it is a single-light window, and the other windows are mullioned and contain casements. At the rear is a mullioned and transomed stair window.	II
Well House; 54.07144°N 2.28786°W	—	Late 18th century	The house is in stone, with shaped eaves modillions, and a slate roof with gable copings and shaped kneelers. There are three storeys and three bays. In the centre is a doorway with a projecting architrave, and above it are single-light windows with plain surrounds. The outer bays contain two-light sash windows with mullions. To the left are former two-storey stables.	II
Rome Farmhouse; 54.06078°N 2.32109°W		1779	The farmhouse is rendered, and has painted stone dressings and a slate roof. There are two storeys and three bays. The central doorway has a plain surround, and above it is an initialled datestone. The windows are mullioned and contain sashes, and in the ground floor is a slate hood mould.	II
Grain Farm House; 54.06406°N 2.31474°W		Late 18th to early 19th century	The farmhouse is rendered, with painted stone dressings, chamfered quoins, moulded eaves modillions, and a stone slate roof with gable coping and shaped kneelers. There are two storeys and three bays, and a recessed bay on the right. The central doorway has Tuscan pilasters and an open pediment. At the front are casement windows with moulded surrounds, and at the rear are chamfered sash windows, and a central segmental-arched stair window with impost blocks, a moulded arch and a keystone.	II
Craven Bank; 54.07298°N 2.29358°W		c. 1801	A master's house for Giggleswick School, it was extended in 1817. The house is rendered, and has stone dressings, quoins, and a slate roof. There are two storeys, a main range of three bays, and a slightly recessed single-bay extension to the left. The doorway has Tuscan pilasters, a round-headed fanlight, and an open pediment. The windows are sashes with plain surrounds, and there is a later dormer.	II
Carrholme Cottage; 54.08547°N 2.28626°W	—	Early 19th century (probable)	A farmhouse, later a cottage, in stone, with painted stone dressings and a slate roof. There are two storeys and two bays, the left bay projecting slightly. The central doorway has a plain surround, and the windows are sashes. Above the doorway are two 17th-century decorated stones.	II
Close House; 54.06566°N 2.30591°W		Early 19th century	The farmhouse, which incorporates earlier material, is rendered, with stone dressings, an eaves cornice, and a hipped slate roof. There are two storeys and three bays. The central doorway has engaged Tuscan columns, a round-headed fanlight, and an open pediment. To its right is a bay window, most of the other windows are sashes, and at the rear is a 17h-century round-headed window with a chamfered surround.	II
The Green; 54.07209°N 2.29272°W	—	Early 19th century	The schoolhouse, which was later extended, is in stone with eaves modillions, and has two storeys and three bays. The doorway has a moulded surround and a decorated dated and inscribed lintel. Some of the windows are casements, and others have moulded mullions.	II
The Harts Head; 54.07250°N 2.28773°W		Early 19th century	The public house, which was later extended, is in stone and has a slate roof with gable coping. The original block has three storeys and three bays, a plinth, quoins, and eaves modillions. The central doorway has Tuscan pilasters, a segmental-ached lintel and a cornice, and the windows are sashes. The extension to the right has two storeys and three bays, and a kneeler on the right. To the left is a doorway with a plain surround, and the windows are a mix of sashes and casements.	II
Coach house, Carrholme Cottage; 54.08524°N 2.28599°W	—	1830	The coach house is rendered, with stone dressings, eaves modillions, and a slate roof. There is one storey and two bays, with the gable end facing the street. In the gable end is a round-headed carriage entrance, flanked by windows with plain surrounds, and over them are hood moulds, lunettes, and a datestone in the gable. In the right return are two blocked round-headed windows.	II
Rallin Brow; 54.07081°N 2.28739°W	—	Early to mid 19th century	The house is rendered, with painted stone dressings, chamfered quoins, a sill band, shaped eaves modillions, and a stone slate roof. There are two storeys and a T-shaped plan, with a front range of three bays, and a rear wing. The central doorway has a moulded surround, and an open pediment on massive ogee consoles. The windows are sashes with plain surrounds. In the rear wing is a re-set doorway with a chamfered surround and a decorated initialled and dated lintel. The barn to the left dates from the 17th century.	II
Pendle View Cottages; 54.07274°N 2.28820°W		1840s	A pair of mirror-image houses, they are rendered, with stone dressings, quoins, a sill band, and a slate roof. There are two storeys at the front and three at the rear, and each house has three bays. The doorways are paired in the centre, and each has a plain surround, projecting impost blocks, and a plain lintel with a rectangular fanlight above. Each house has a central round-headed staircase window with a plain surround, impost blocks, and a pendant keystone. The other windows are sashes, those in the ground floor with a moulded base to the jambs, and shaped lintels.	II
Hostel, Giggleswick School; 54.07287°N 2.29398°W		1868	The hostel and dining hall were designed by Austin and Paley, and extended by them to the north in 1875. The building is in stone with a Westmorland slate roof. In the centre is a three-stage two-bay tower, to the left is a two-storey six-bay range and at the end is a projecting gabled three-storey bay, and to the right of the tower is a five-bay range and a gabled bay. The tower contains a doorway with a four-centred arch and a moulded surround, and a mullioned and transomed window to the right. Above are similar windows, a sill band, and an embattled parapet with gargoyles on the left bay, and a gable on the right bay with a crocketed finial. The flanking ranges contain two-light windows and gabled dormers, and in the extreme left bay is a canted bay window.	II
Boundary stone southeast of Blaithwaite Farmhouse; 54.07763°N 2.33484°W		Late 19th century	The parish boundary stone is a slab about 60 centimetres (24 in) high, the upper surface angled from top left to bottom right. It is inscribed "GIGGLESWICK".	II
Boundary stone southeast of Lane End House; 54.08204°N 2.32604°W		Late 19th century	The parish boundary stone is a slab about 1 metre (3 ft 3 in) high and 1 metre (3 ft 3 in) wide. It has a chamfered surround and a vertical central dividing groove. The left side is inscribed "LAWKLAND" and the right side "GIGGLESWICK".	II
Science block and lecture room, Giggleswick School; 54.07214°N 2.29429°W		c. 1876	The building was designed by Austin and Paley, it was extended in 1900, and is in stone with a Westmorland slate roof. The earlier block on the left has a single storey, and a projecting gabled porch on the left containing a doorway with a Tudor arched head, and is flanked by mullioned and transomed windows. The extension has a three-storey tower with a trefoil-headed window in the top storey and a hood mould, above which is a parapet. To the right are two storeys and three bays, the middle bay gabled, with a segmental-arched arcade in the ground floor and mullioned and transomed windows above.	II
Main classroom block and assembly hall, Giggleswick School; 54.07191°N 2.29403°W	—	1886	The block and hall were designed by Austin and Paley, and are in stone with a Westmorland slate roof. The entrance range has two storeys and three bays, the middle bay projecting and gabled. It contains a round-arched doorway with a moulded surround and a hood mould. Above is a large mullioned and transomed staircase window with a hood mould, and a clock face in the gable. The outer bays contain mullioned and transomed windows, and in the roof are canted dormers. Behind, is a range with two storeys and three bays with tall half-dormers, and at the rear is a large projecting gabled bay.	II
Chapel, Giggleswick School; 54.07093°N 2.29616°W		1897–1901	The chapel, designed by T. G. Jackson, is in red sandstone, with bands of gritstone and limestone, sandstone dressings, a copper hipped roof on the nave, and Elterwater slate on the aisles. It has a cruciform plan, with a west narthex, a nave with narrow aisles, and a chancel over which is a terracotta dome with a copper roof. At the west end, the narthex has four segmental arches, and above is a rose window. On the corners of the chancel are octagonal turrets with louvred bell openings and sandstone caps.	II*
Cricket pavilion, Giggleswick School; 54.07206°N 2.29816°W		c. 1901	The cricket pavilion, designed by T. G. Jackson, is in stone, with a Westmorland slate roof, one storey and three gabled bays. On the front is an open verandah with four octagonal shafts. In the left and middle bays are French windows with four lights, mullions and transoms. In the middle of the roof is a clock turret with an ogee lead roof and a weathervane.	II
Gatehouse, Giggleswick School; 54.07181°N 2.29569°W		1901	The gatehouse at the entrance to the sports field, designed by T. G. Jackson, is in stone, with a Westmorland slate roof, one storey and three bays. The entrance has a four-centred arch with a moulded surround and wooden gates, and above it is a lantern. To its left is a doorway with a moulded surround and a decorated lintel, and here are small mullioned windows.	II
