= John Alexander (New Zealand politician) =

New Zealand politician

The Honourable John Alexander CMG
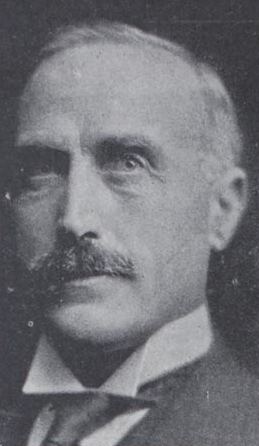

Member of the New Zealand Legislative Council
- In office 22 June 1934 – 21 June 1941

Personal details
- Born: 1876 Newtownards, Ulster, Northern Ireland
- Died: 15 July 1941 (aged 65) Remuera, Auckland, New Zealand
- Education: Prince Albert College
- Occupation: barrister

John Alexander CMG (1876 – 15 July 1941) was a member of the New Zealand Legislative Council from 1934 to 1941 when his term ended. He was a barrister and involved in many organisations.

== Early life and legal career ==
Alexander was born in 1876 in Newtownards, Ulster, Ireland. His father was Robert Alexander of Belfast. He received his education at Methodist College Belfast and, after he emigrated to New Zealand, at Prince Albert College in Auckland. On 15 November 1905, he married Amy Walker, the youngest daughter of mining engineer John Watson Walker, at Tararu near Thames. His wife was a cousin of Nellie Melba (their mothers were sisters), the Australian operatic soprano based in Europe who had an international career. On her tours in New Zealand, she would stay with the Alexanders when in Auckland. The Alexanders lived at Devonport and their house burned down at the end of 1913.

He was admitted to the Supreme Court in Auckland in 1899 as a solicitor and three years later, he became a barrister. He became a notary public in 1921. He founded the legal firm Alexander, Bennett (Alfred Ferdinand Bennett), Sutherland (John Leslie Sutherland), and Warnock (Andrew Martin Warnock), which existed until 1938. From 1923 to 1925, he was the president of the Auckland Law Society.

== Community service ==
Alexander was an official visitor at the Auckland Mental Hospital from 1920. In October 1926, he joined the Prisons Board and remained a member until shortly before his death. In the 1927 New Year Honours, he was appointed a Companion of the Order of St Michael and St George, in recognition of his services to New Zealand. He was a president and then trustee of the Auckland Club. From 1929 to 1931, he was president of the Auckland Savings Bank. At one time, he was president of the Ulster Society of Auckland. Alexander was the inaugural president of the Auckland branch of the Navy League. For the Royal New Zealand Yacht Squadron, he was a rear-commodore and vice-commodore.

The director of Kew Gardens, Sir Arthur Hill, was in Auckland in 1932 and they visited a kauri forest owned by Alexander near Cascade Park in the Waitakere Ranges. Hill commented on the asset that such a forest represented to the city and in October 1933, Alexander gifted this 48 acres (19 ha) property to the City of Auckland. Alexander had bought the land 25 years earlier.

== Legislative Council and death ==
He was appointed to the Legislative Council by the United–Reform coalition Government on 22 June 1934. In November 1940, he underwent a serious operation and remained in hospital until February 1941 before he returned to his home in Remuera. He retired from the Legislative Council at the end of his seven-year term on 21 June 1941. On 15 July 1941, less than a month of his retirement, he died at his home in Remuera Road. He was survived by his wife Amy and their son Harcourt. His wife died in 1948.

On 17 July, several members of the 26th Parliament spoke in memory of Alexander: Walter Nash (acting Prime Minister), Sidney Holland (Leader of the Opposition), Rex Mason (Attorney-General), Bill Endean (member for Remuera), and Bill Schramm (member for Auckland East). The Legislative Council next met on 22 July and the following spoke about Alexander: David Wilson (Leader of the House), Bernard Martin, Jack McCullough, William McIntyre, and James Cotter.
