= Alfred Langler =

Australian journalist and newspaper editor (1865–1928)

Sir Alfred Langler (5 May 1865 – 26 March 1928) was an Australian journalist and newspaper editor. He had a long association with The West Australian, serving as editor from 1916 to 1927.

Langler was born in Ipplepen, Devon, England, to Susanna (née Colton) and William Langler. He joined the staff of the Western Daily Mercury at a young age, as an apprentice journalist. Langler emigrated to South Australia in 1890, where he began working for The Register. He moved to Perth in July 1895 to become a sub-editor of The West Australian, and in 1902 replaced John Nanson as assistant editor and leader writer. After the deaths of several of the paper's key figures (including co-owners Charles Harper in 1912 and John Winthrop Hackett in 1916), Langler was made chief editor.

Despite the death of its previous owners, The West Australian was not re-sold until 1926, when it was purchased by William Sydney Robinson and William Baillieu for A£625,000. Langler became chairman of directors of its new holding company, West Australian Newspapers, and, as executor of Hackett's will, oversaw the distribution of the money to his estate (including large donations to the University of Western Australia and the Anglican Diocese of Perth). Langler was created a Knight Bachelor in the 1927 New Year Honours, and retired the same year after the onset of dementia. He died in Perth in March 1928, aged 63, from bronchopneumonia. He had married Josephine Laverton in 1893, with whom he had two children.
