= Ivy Fold =

House in Giggleswick, North Yorkshire, England

Coordinates: 54°04′20″N 2°17′25″W

Ivy Fold is a historic building in Giggleswick, a village in North Yorkshire, in England.

The house was built in about 1652 by Anthony Lister, vicar of St Alkelda's Church, Giggleswick. The left-hand wing was added in 1669, and the right-hand wing was altered in 1677. The vicarage was later converted into three houses. The building was grade II* listed in 1958, and altered in 1970, when a new front door was installed.

The building is constructed of stone with a stone slate roof and two storeys. It has an L-shaped plan, with a left wing of two bays, and a right wing of three bays. The windows have chamfered surrounds and mullions, and some have hood moulds. Both wings contain a doorway with a moulded surround and a segmental-arched decorated, dated and initialled lintel. Inside, there are three mid-17th century fireplaces, the one in the left-hand wing being next to a beehive oven.

== See also ==
- Grade II* listed buildings in North Yorkshire (district)
- Listed buildings in Giggleswick
