= Walter Anstead =

English cricketer (1845–1933)

Personal information
- Full name: Walter Anstead
- Born: 26 February 1845; Twickenham, England
- Died: 14 May 1933 (aged 88); Bournemouth, England
- Batting: Right-handed
- Bowling: Right-arm fast-medium

Domestic team information
- Years: Team
- 1870–1872: Surrey
- FC debut: 11 August 1870 Surrey v Lancashire
- Last FC: 18 July 1872 Surrey v Gloucestershire

Career statistics
Competition	First-class
Matches	7
Runs scored	61
Batting average	6.10
100s/50s	0/0
Top score	17
Balls bowled	1,381
Wickets	48
Bowling average	11.29
5 wickets in innings	5
10 wickets in match	1
Best bowling	6/27
Catches/stumpings	2/–
- Source: CricketArchive, 6 September 2008

Walter Anstead (1845–1933) was an English first-class cricketer who played six matches for Surrey between 1870 and 1872. A right arm fast bowler, he was highly successful in the handful of games he appeared in, taking an impressive 48 wickets at just 11.29 with a strike rate of a wicket every 28.77 balls. His best bowling, of 6 for 27, came against Lancashire at the Oval on his debut in 1870, a performance which helped Surrey to an innings victory, while a week later he took 11 wickets in the game against Sussex, helping his team to a victory by just 14 runs. After four games in August 1870 he reappeared only once in 1871 and 1872. His brother Thomas Anstead was a notable player in club cricket while his son Rudolph Anstead played a first-class match in India in 1921/22.
