= Settle Bridge =

Bridge in North Yorkshire, England

Coordinates: 54°04′21″N 2°16′55″W

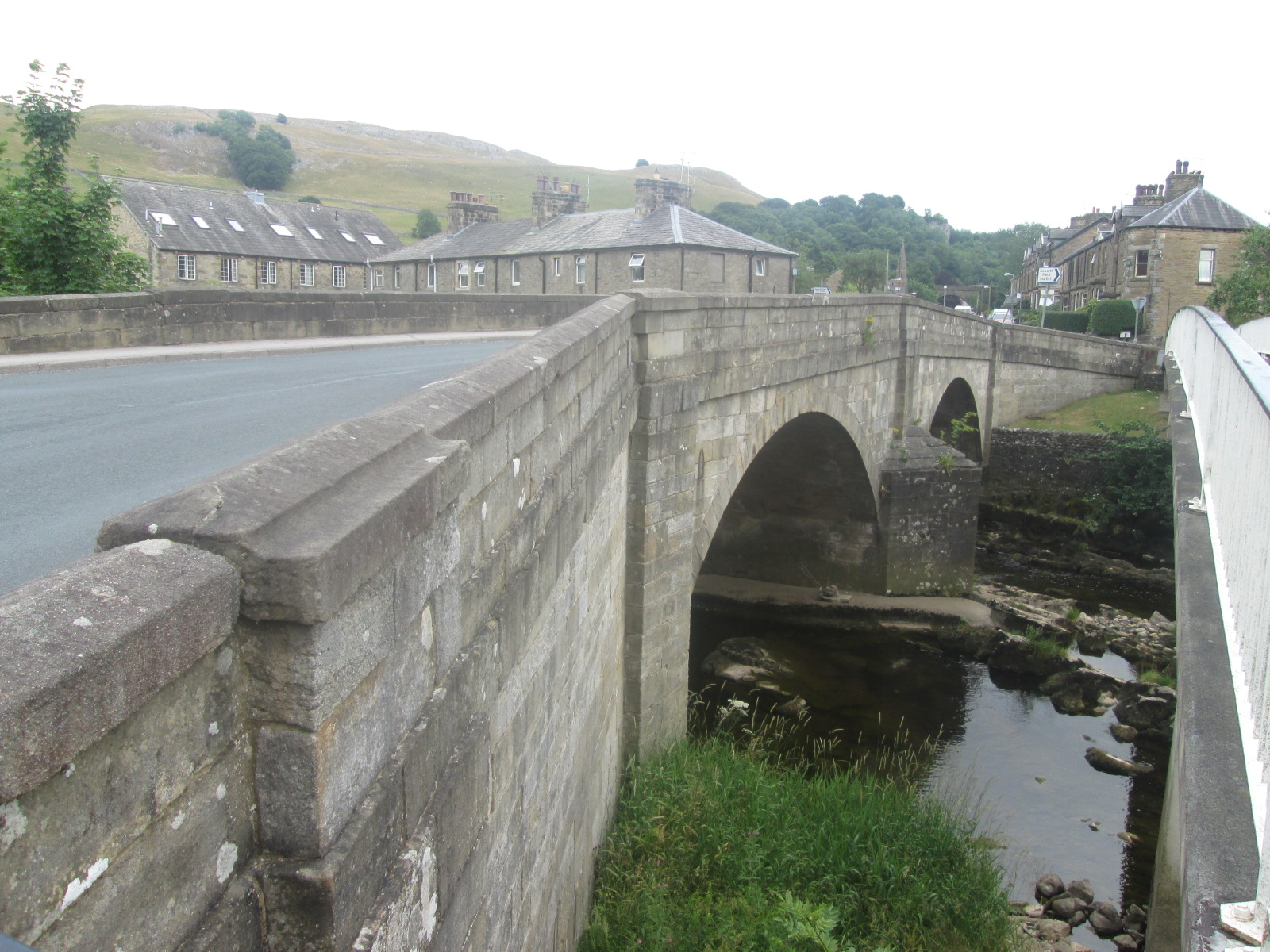
The bridge, in 2013

Settle Bridge is a historic road bridge connecting Settle with Giggleswick in North Yorkshire, in England.

The bridge was probably built in the late 17th century, on the route connecting Keighley with Kendal. When the road was turnpiked, a toll bar was added at the bridge. In 1837, the bridge was widened on the south side by 4 feet (1.2 m), making it 14 feet (4.3 m) wide. Its parapet walls were added in the 19th century. The bridge was grade II* listed in 1987, and was formerly a scheduled monument. It carries the B6480 road over the River Ribble, and the Ribble Way long-distance footpath passes its north end.

The bridge is built of stone and consists of two elliptical arches. It has four ribs on the upstream side of each arch, chamfered at the base, and a cutwater, also on the upstream side.

== See also ==
- Grade II* listed buildings in North Yorkshire (district)
- Listed buildings in Giggleswick
