= C.F. Mott College of Education =

Training college in Merseyside, England

Location
- Huyton, Prescot
- 53.4258°N 2.8247°W

Information
- Type: Training college
- Established: 1946
- Website: ljmu.ac.uk

The C.F. Mott College of Education was a college located in Huyton and Prescot in the Metropolitan Borough of Knowsley of Merseyside.

== History ==
The college was named after Charles Francis Mott who was the Director of Education of Liverpool from 1922 to 1945.

It was also known as City of Liverpool College of Higher Education (COLCHE).

It became an affiliate college of Lancaster University, offering a programme of arts and science degrees which were conferred in the annual ceremony at Lancaster University.

It was absorbed into Liverpool Polytechnic by 1983.

As of 2026, the original site of the college is being redeveloped as "Kings Business Park," retaining only "The Hazels," a Grade II listed 1764 building.

== Notable alumni ==
Notable alumni include the actress and comedian Caroline Aherne, rock musician Julian Cope and Radiohead drummer Philip Selway, actor Richard Hawley and funny man Greg Meredith (and Dave Hewitt)
