= Giggleswick Market Cross =

Market cross in Giggleswick, North Yorkshire, England

Coordinates: 54°04′19″N 2°17′20″W

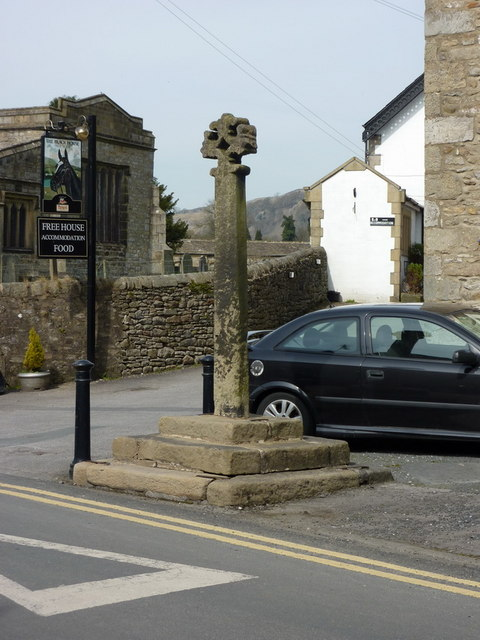
The cross, in 2010

Giggleswick Market Cross is a historic structure in Giggleswick, a village in North Yorkshire, in England.

The cross was constructed in about 1400, at which time, Giggleswick held a market charter. In 1708, the neighbouring town of Settle was also granted a market charter, and the market at Giggleswick faded away, although the cross survived. One tradition claims that the cross at Giggleswick was originally located in Settle, but was relocated to Giggleswick, to promote its primacy in the late Mediaeval period. Another tradition claims that the cross was damaged by a resident of Settle in response to a local dispute. The cross was grade II listed in 1958, and has been a scheduled monument since 1995.

The market cross was moved to its present site in 1840. It is built of millstone grit, and is about 2.4 metres (7 ft 10 in) high. It has a square base of three steps, the lowest of which is about 2 metres square. It has a chamfered shaft, 30cm wide and 22cm deep, and a head in the form of trefoiled Greek cross with a pierced centre.

== See also ==
- Listed buildings in Giggleswick
