= Duncan Cumming =

British soldier and colonial administrator (1903–1979)

Major General Sir Duncan Cumming, KBE, CB (10 August 1903 – 10 December 1979) was a twentieth-century British colonial administrator. In 1930, he married Nancy Acheson Houghton (died 1971); they had one daughter, the author Ann Schlee (born 1934).

== Education ==
Cumming attended Giggleswick School in the West Riding of Yorkshire and Caius College, Cambridge, where he read history. Whilst at Cambridge he played rugby for England in 1925.

== Career ==
From Cambridge Cumming joined the Sudan Political Service. In 1941 he was sent to Eritrea when it was captured during the Second World War, to establish British military administration. He became chief administrator of Cyrenaica in 1942. In 1945 he became chief civil affairs officer, Middle East as a major-general responsible to the War Office, 1945–48. From 1948 the military administrations were transferred to the Foreign Office under his influence. He became governor of Kordofan Province, Sudan, 1949 and deputy civil secretary to the Sudan Government, 1950–51.

During, and after, the war he was responsible for the civil administration of all of the occupied Italian Colonies in the Middle East, of which Eritrea was one. Subsequently, he worked for BOAC as managing director of Associated Companies Ltd, 1955–59 and Adviser on African Affairs, 1959–64. He was also a biographer of the traveller Mansfield Parkyns.

Cumming was knighted in 1953. He was the honorary treasurer of the Royal Geographical Society (1971–74) and president (1974–77). He was president of the Society for Libyan Studies (1969–74). He was a member of the Mount Everest Foundation 1971–77 and the British Institute in Eastern Africa.
