= Rudolph Anstead =

English cricketer

Personal information
- Full name: Rudolph David Anstead
- Born: 2 June 1876; Wisbech, Cambridgeshire, England
- Died: 6 January 1962 (aged 85); Bishop's Stortford, Hertfordshire, England
- Batting: Unknown
- Bowling: Unknown
- Relatives: Walter Anstead (father)

Domestic team information
- Years: Team
- 1897–1899: Cambridgeshire
- 1921/22: Europeans

Career statistics
Competition	First-class
Matches	1
Runs scored	4
Batting average	2.00
100s/50s	–/–
Top score	4
Balls bowled	30
Wickets	0
Bowling average	–
5 wickets in innings	–
10 wickets in match	–
Best bowling	–
Catches/stumpings	1/–
- Source: Cricinfo, 18 July 2019

Rudolph David Anstead (2 June 1876 – 6 January 1962) was an English first-class cricketer.

The son of the cricketer Walter Anstead, he was born in June 1876 at Wisbech. He was educated at Giggleswick School, before going up to Christ's College, Cambridge. He played minor counties cricket for Norfolk from 1897–99, making eleven appearances in the Minor Counties Championship. After studying natural sciences at Cambridge, he graduated in 1899. He worked as an analyst at a chemical plant at Hull in 1899–1900, before working as a researcher in a government laboratory at Bridgetown, Barbados from 1900–05, which included working for the Imperial Department of Agriculture in the British West Indies. From 1905–09, was the agricultural superintendent for the Botanical Gardens, Grenada. From 1909, he relocated to British India, where he worked as a scientific officer for the United Planters Association of Southern India until 1920. He served as the deputy director of planting districts in Coimbatore in 1920, before serving as the director of agriculture at the Madras Agricultural Department from 1922–33.

While in British India, he made a single appearance in first-class cricket for the Europeans cricket team against the Indians in 1921–22 Madras Presidency. Batting twice in the match, he was dismissed for 4 runs in the Europeans first-innings by Lakshmanan Rao, while in their second-innings he was dismissed without scoring by T. Vasu Nayudu. He was a fellow at the University of Madras and was made a Companion of the Order of the Indian Empire in the 1927 New Year Honours. He retired in 1931 and returned to England, where he died at Bishop's Stortford in January 1962.
