= Joseph Child Priestley =

English lawyer (1862–1941)

Sir Joseph Child Priestley KC JP DL

Personal details
- Born: 11 January 1862 Portman Square, Marylebone, London, England
- Died: 9 June 1941 (aged 79) Gosmore, Hertfordshire, England

Sir Joseph Child Priestley (11 January 1862 – 9 June 1941) was an English barrister and magistrate, active in public life in Hertfordshire.

== Early life ==
Priestley was born at No. 31, Somerset Street, Portman Square, Marylebone on 11 January 1862, the son of Sir William Overend Priestley and his wife, Lady Eliza (the daughter of Robert Chambers, the well known publisher, of Edinburgh). He entered Marlborough College in 1876, where he was a member of Preshute House. He left the school at the end of the Christmas term, 1878, and was admitted as a pensioner at Pembroke College, Cambridge on 11 October 1880. He graduated as a Bachelor of Arts in 1884.

Around 1884, he entered into a partnership with Horatio Hooper and William Campbell as ship owners and ship managers, at No. 15, Mount Stuart Square, Cardiff, under the style or firm of Hooper, Campbell, and Co. He was commissioned and appointed as a Lieutenant in the 1st Glamorganshire Artillery Volunteer Corps, with effect from 19 July 1884.

Having decided to train as a barrister, he dissolved his partnership with Hooper and Campbell on 15 December 1885, and was admitted as a student of law at the Inner Temple on 9 January 1886. He was struck off the strength of the Glamorganshire Artillery Volunteer Corps, and appointed to the 3rd Middlesex Artillery Volunteer Corps, with effect from 11 December 1886.

Having successfully sat the Council of Legal Education's General Examination, held in Lincoln's Inn Hall in March 1888, he resigned his commission in the Volunteer Force with effect from 19 May 1888, and was called to the Bar at the Inner Temple on 13 June 1888.

== Barrister at Law ==
Priestley was a pupil of, and devilled for, C.A. Middleton, who for long had enjoyed one of the best junior practices in the Probate and Divorce Court. On Middleton's death in 1891 a large share of his business was inherited by Priestley. He succeeded in building himself a lucrative career as a practitioner in the Probate and Divorce courts, and went the Wales and Chester Circuit.

His obituarist in The Times wrote that, "To a charming voice and manner he added great care and industry in the preparation of his cases, and the fashionable silk brought in to champion the cause of the fashionable litigant could always feel safe when the spade work was in Priestley's hands."

Priestley was appointed by Letters Patent under the Great Seal to be one of His Majesty's Counsel learned in the Law on 26 February 1903 and was called within the Bar on 3 March 1903.

Despite this mark of professional expertise, it seems he suffered from a lack of confidence in himself as a senior counsel, which made him less successful than when he had practised as a junior. He gave evidence before the Royal Commission on Divorce and Matrimonial Causes on 7 March 1910, and served as an additional member of the General Council of the Bar in 1912–1913. Many years later, in 1933, he gave evidence to the Business of Courts Committee. He was elected as a Master of the Bench of the Inner Temple in November 1917.

== Magistrate ==
Priestley's career in public service can be said to have begun in 1906 when he was appointed as a Justice of the Peace for the Hitchin Petty Sessional Division in Hertfordshire, taking the oaths of office at the Quarter Sessions on 18 June 1906. He went on to serve as deputy-chairman and chairman (1924–1941) of the Hitchin Division of the Hertfordshire Quarter Sessions.

In December 1928, he gave evidence before the Royal Commission on Police Powers and Procedure, during which he stated that he would 'strongly condemn the introduction of methods similar to those exercised in the French courts in the examination of the accused, and what are called third degree methods in the United States.'

== Public service ==
Having acted in 1910 as arbitrator in the industrial dispute between Messrs. Wm. Hollins & Co., Ltd., worsted spinners of Mansfield, and disaffected members of its workforce, he was appointed by the Board of Trade in 1911 to serve as Chairman of the Court of Referees for the Cambridge district, London and South Eastern Division, under the National Insurance Act 1911. In March 1916, at the height of the First World War, he joined the Appeal Tribunal for the County of Hertford, under the Second Schedule to the Military Service Act 1916.

In 1919, the British Government had established a General Nursing Council under the Nurses Registration Act 1919. In 1921 the Privy Council was asked to nominate a lawyer of standing to preside over the council's judicial sub-committee. Priestley was recommended by Sir Almeric FitzRoy, Clerk of the Privy Council, as a man of 'agreeable manner and tactful.' Although the Minister of Health had no power under the act to appoint the chairman of the General Nursing Council, he appointed Priestley to the position, 'since he was associated with neither the College nor the Central Committee and could therefore be regarded as impartial.'

In July 1921, the council announced it had framed, and the Minister of Health had approved, rules for the admission of nurses to an official register under the Nurses Registration Act 1919, and the register was opened. In the following months "lay" and "professional" members of the council differed over the appointment of the first registrar, and whether nurses' qualifications should be entered in the register. The controversy became so severe that by the end of the year the majority of members of the council – including Priestley – had resigned.

In February 1925 he was appointed by the Secretary of State for the Home Department to chair the Departmental Committee on Sexual Offences Against Young Persons, in succession to the late Sir Ryland Adkins.

When the committee reported to the Minister in December 1925, Priestley and two other members submitted a memorandum to the effect that they were unable to agree to the committee's recommendation to raise the age of consent from 16 to 17 years.

In the meanwhile, in November 1925, Priestley had also been appointed a member of the Government Committee on Schemes of Assistance to Necessitous Areas representing the County Councils Association. The committee reported to the Prime Minister in March 1926.

He was appointed to the Royal Commission on Land Drainage in March 1927.

In 1930 he was elected as chairman of Hertfordshire County Council, continuing to serve as such until April 1939.

Priestley received recognition for his services to county and country. Having been commissioned as a Deputy Lieutenant for the County of Hertford on 22 December 1924, he was made a Knight Bachelor in the 1927 New Year Honours, being described as "Chairman of the Herts Quarter Sessions. For public services." He was knighted by King George V at Buckingham Palace on 17 February 1927.

== Death ==
Priestley died, aged 79 years, at King's Hill, Gosmore near Hitchin on 9 June 1941. His funeral was held in St. Martin's Church, Preston near Hitchin on 12 June 1941. He left effects valued at £118 211. His obituary in The Times stated that his death had broken 'a link with the generation of practitioners in the Probate and Divorce Division at the end of the last [19th] and beginning of the present [20th] centuries, among whom he was for many years an outstanding figure.' It particularly referred both to his 'charming voice and manner' and his 'agreeable personality.' The Inner Temple, with the help of a grant from a trust set up in Sir Joseph's memory, continues to award Sir Joseph Priestley Scholarships to enable newly qualified barristers to pursue projects "that will widen their experience of the world outside the bar, and thereby enhance the skills that they can thereafter bring to their practice."

== Family ==
Priestley was married in the Church of St. Edward the Confessor in Romford on 30 July 1891 to Annette Maud Warner Price (the daughter of Ralph George Price, JP, a magistrate, merchant and manufacturer of Marshalls Park in Romford, and his wife, Annette Mary Warner. She was born in Brighton on 21 January 1870). Lady Priestley died at King's Hill on 19 July 1946. They had issue, two children: a son, Captain Douglas Ralph Overend Priestley, MC (1893–1941), and a daughter, Monica Priestley (1898–1946).

== Portrait ==
A portrait of Sir Joseph Priestley has been published at the BBC's "Your Paintings" website, see Sir Joseph Priestly, KC, Chairman of the County Council (1930–1939)
