= Bolton baronets =

Extinct baronetcy in the Baronetage of the United Kingdom

The Bolton Baronetcy, of West Plean in the County of Stirling, was a title in the Baronetage of the United Kingdom. It was created on 25 January 1927 for Edwin Bolton, Chairman of the Territorial Army Association. The second Baronet was Lord-Lieutenant of Stirlingshire. The title became extinct on his death in 1982.

== Bolton baronets, of West Plean (1927) ==
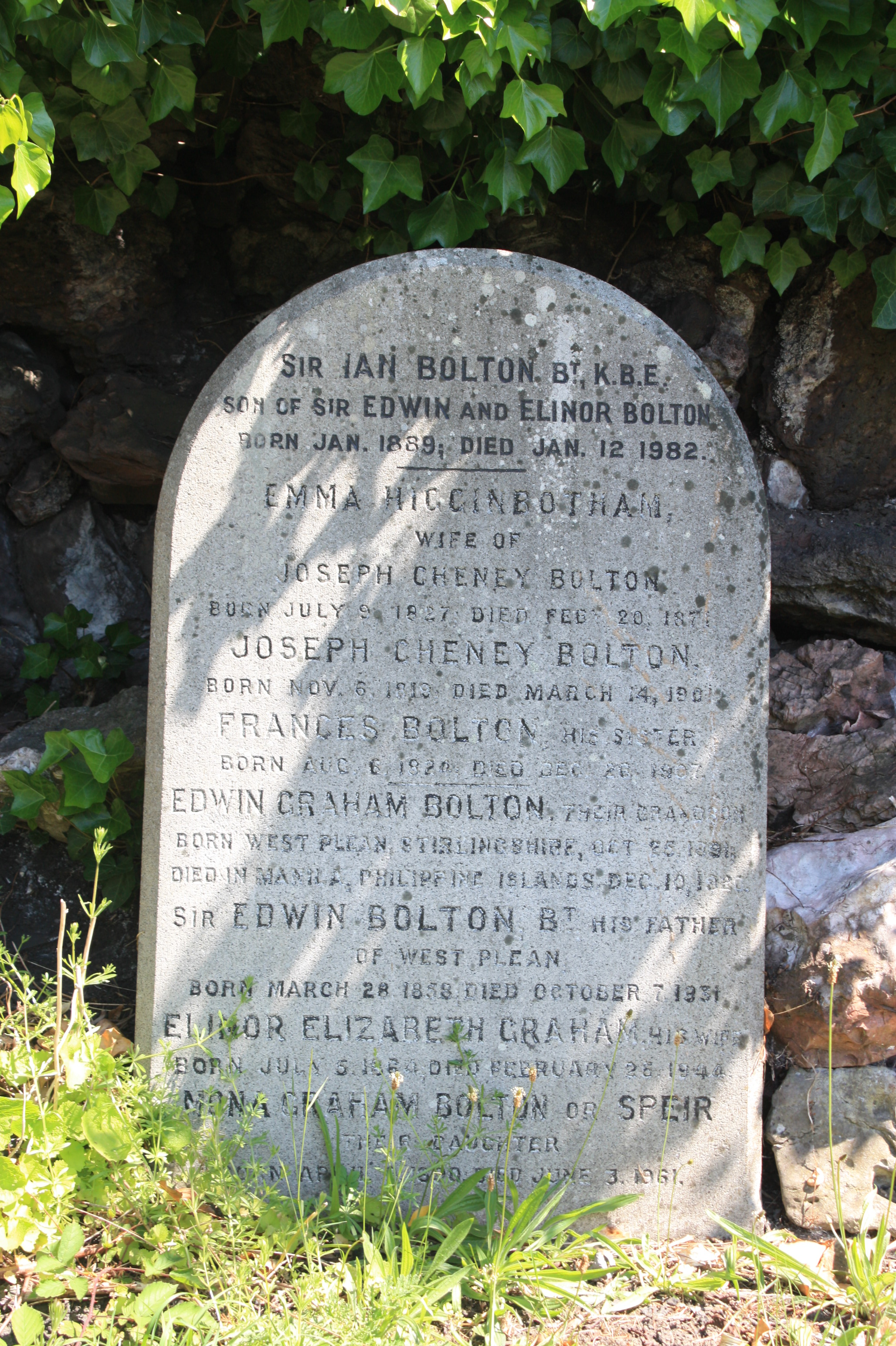
The grave of the Bolton baronets, Glasgow Necropolis

- Sir Edwin Bolton, MBE, 1st Baronet (1858–1931)
- Sir Ian Frederick Cheney Bolton, KBE, 2nd Baronet (1889–1982)

The simple grave of the baronets stands on the middle north-west slopes of the Glasgow Necropolis.
