= Ryecroft =

Ryecroft may refer to:

- Ryecroft, Greater Manchester
- Ryecroft, South Yorkshire
- Ryecroft, West Midlands
- Ryecroft, West Yorkshire
