= William Pell Barton =

Sir William Pell Barton KCIE, CSI
- Born: 29 May 1871
- Died: 28 November 1956 (aged 85)
- Education: Bedford Modern School; Worcester College, Oxford; University College London

Sir William Pell Barton, KCIE, CSI (29 May 1871 – 28 November 1956) had a distinguished career in the Indian Political Service. He was British Resident in Baroda (1919), Mysore (1920–25) and Hyderabad (1925–30) and was well known as an authority on the North West Frontier and the Princely states during the days of British rule in India. On leaving the service he worked as an historian of the Princely states and was a frequent contributor to periodicals on issues concerning India and Pakistan.

== Early life ==
William Pell Barton was born in Northampton on 29 May 1871, the son of William and Sarah Barton, both of Northamptonshire. He was educated at Bedford Modern School, Worcester College, Oxford, and University College London.

== Career ==
In 1893 he passed the Indian Civil Service examinations and left England for the Punjab. He was head of several administered districts in the North West Frontier and would later move to the Indian Political Service initially as Political Agent in the Princely states of Dir, Swat and Chitral.

In 1911, Barton was made secretary to Sir George Roos-Keppel, then Chief Commissioner of the North West Frontier. By 1915 he was Judicial Commissioner of the North West Frontier and was briefly British Resident in Baroda in 1919 before returning to the Frontier where he undertook political service in the short Afghan War and became Chief Political Agent with the Waziristan Field Force.

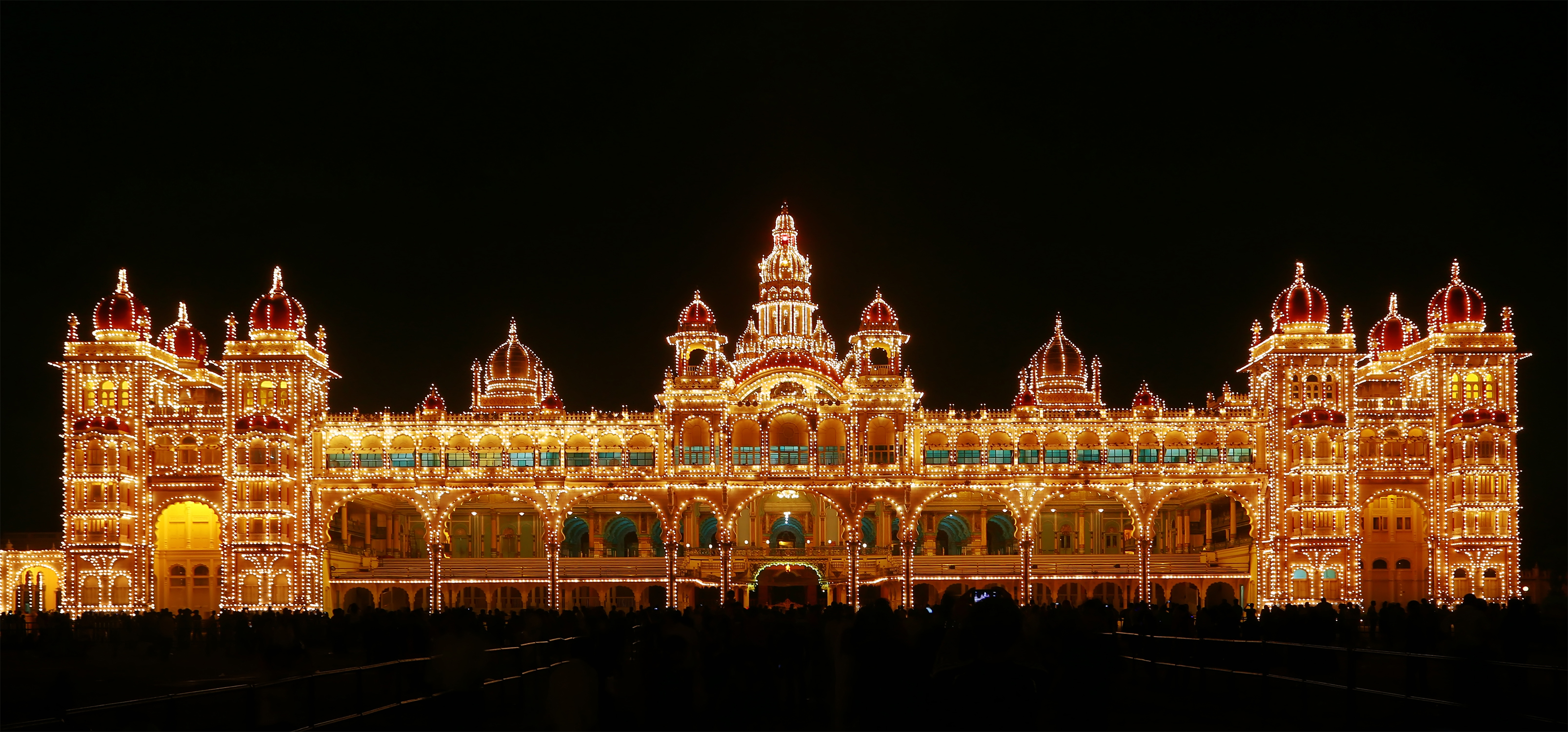
Mysore Palace

Between 1920 and 1925, Barton was British Resident in Mysore and Chief Commissioner of Coorg. In 1925 he was made British Resident in Hyderabad, during which time he further established good relationships in the Princely states and was on good terms with Sir Akbar Hydari. His obituary in The Times states that ‘In all these capacities his quiet manner and innate kindness were linked with discriminating judgment and strength of purpose’.

Barton was made a Knight Commander in the Order of the Indian Empire in 1927.

== Authorship ==
On leaving the service he worked as an historian of the Princely states and was a frequent contributor to periodicals on Indian and Pakistani matters.

== Family life ==
Barton married Evelyn Agnes Heriz-Smith with whom he had two daughters. He died at his home in Ardingly, Sussex on 28 November 1956.

One of his daughters, Elizabeth Vidal Barton, was a prolific historical biographer. Elizabeth Vidal Barton married Sir Richard Hamilton, 9th Baronet.

== Selected work ==
- The Princes of India. Published by Nisbet & Co., London, 1934
- India's North West Frontier. Published by John Murray, London, 1939
- India's Fateful Hour. Published by John Murray, London, 1942
