= Lewthwaite baronets =

Extinct baronetcy in the Baronetage of the United Kingdom

The Lewthwaite Baronetcy, of Broadgate in the Parish of Thwaites in the County of Cumberland, was a title in the Baronetage of the United Kingdom. It was created on 26 January 1927 for William Lewthwaite. He was Chairman of the Conservative Association of the Egremont Division of Cumberland for many years and also served as Vice-Lieutenant of Cumberland. The title became extinct on the death of the fifth Baronet in 2004.

== Lewthwaite baronets, of Broadgate (1927) ==
- Sir William Lewthwaite, 1st Baronet (1853–1927)
- Sir William Lewthwaite, 2nd Baronet (1882–1933)
- Sir William Anthony Lewthwaite, 3rd Baronet (1912–1993)
- Sir Rainald Gilfrid Lewthwaite CVO OBE MC, 4th Baronet (1913–2003)
- Sir David Rainald Lewthwaite, 5th Baronet (1940–2004)

== Arms ==
Coat of arms of Lewthwaite baronets
Crest A garb Or bound by a serpent nowed Proper holding in the mouth a cross-crosslet fitchee Gules. Escutcheon Ermine a cross flory Azure fretty Or. Motto Virtus ad aethera tendens
