= William McIntyre (New Zealand politician) =

New Zealand politician

The Honourable William McIntyre

Member of the Legislative Council
- In office 2 September 1921 – 26 October 1949

Personal details
- Born: 1881 Scotland
- Died: 26 October 1949 (aged 67–68) New Zealand
- Party: Reform Party

William Henderson McIntyre (1881 – 26 October 1949) was a member of the New Zealand Legislative Council from 2 September 1921 to 1 September 1928; 2 September 1928 to 2 September 1935; 2 September 1935 to 1 September 1942; 10 September 1942 to 9 September 1949; 16 September 1949 to 26 October 1949, when he died. McIntyre was first appointed by the Reform Government, and finally by the First Labour Government.

He served on several boards, including: the Buller Hospital Board for 33 years including 20 years as chairman; the Nelson Education Board for 31 years including 19 years as chairman; and the Westport Harbour Board from 1918 to 1921. He was elected to the Buller County Council in 1915 and was its chairman for four years.

A Scottish-born coal miner, McIntyre arrived in New Zealand in 1904, and took an active role in mining union affairs. With his brother he set a record for the coal mined in one shift at the Millerton Mine.

In 1935, McIntyre was awarded the King George V Silver Jubilee Medal. He died on 26 October 1949, and was buried at Orowaiti Cemetery, Westport.
