= Charles Rycroft (businessman) =

English businessman

- Born: 21 March 1901; Pudsey, England
- Died: 19 August 1998 (aged 97); South Africa
- Monuments: Harcroft Lecture Theatre, Jersey
- Education: Giggleswick School, Yorkshire
- Occupations: Businessman, philanthropist
- Spouses: Muriel Parsons (1936–1974); Louise Jackson (m. 1981)

Charles Louis Rycroft (21 March 1901 – 19 August 1998) was an English businessman, an important contributor to the development of the Malayan rubber industry, and a major philanthropist and benefactor of the Durrell Wildlife Conservation Trust.

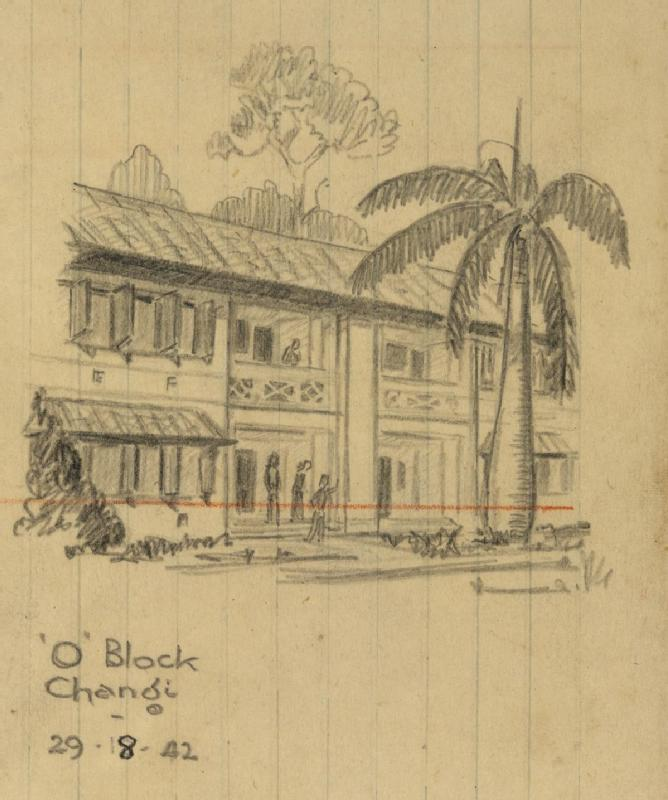
"O" Block of the Changi camp

== Early life ==
Charles Rycroft was the younger son of Yorkshire textile manufacturer and merchant George Henry Rycroft (d: 1950), and grew up in Pudsey between Leeds and Bradford. He had an elder brother, Frederick, and an elder sister, Alice Kathleen. After schooling at Giggleswick School to the age of 14, Charles was apprenticed as a plumber. He completed his apprenticeship and went on to work in the family woolen mill business during the 1920s. He spent some time in Belgium, at the associate company that worked with the woolen mill. In 1921, the family also acquired the Villa Walburg in the town of Epstein outside Frankfurt in Germany, at which they spent their annual summer holiday until its sale in 1933. Around 1919, George Henry Rycroft, in partnership with a Mr Hartley, purchased a rubber plantation in British Malaya at Perak; to the south south east of Penang. This plantation was named Harcroft (a portmanteau of Hartley and Rycroft). The eldest son Frederick Rycroft (1894–1984) was despatched to run the new business, but was recalled in 1922 after a business disagreement with his father. After about two years with a manager running the estate, who was finally sacked, Charles was dispatched to Malaya in 1924 to turn around the problems that had been caused.

== Malaya ==
Charles soon established a large crepe rubber factory on the estate in order to add value to the raw latex. The crepe rubber was exported to be used mainly for shoe soles. Although the estate was relatively small, the factory purchased latex from surrounding producers and was one of the largest manufacturers of crepe rubber at the time. In 1936, going somewhat against the conventions of the time, Charles married Muriel Susan Elizabeth Parsons, a divorcee and secretary, and not part of the landed plantation community. Muriel and her first husband had accompanied Charles when he visited his parents in the Isle of Man in 1934.

During the 1930s Charles, later with Muriel, travelled extensively in China and Japan, learning Mandarin in the process and even being invited once to play mahjong against Chinese leader Chiang Kai-Shek on a train journey to Shanghai.

On the outbreak of hostilities with Japan in December 1941, the Rycrofts initially agreed to help with the war effort by housing 3,000 soldiers in the factory drying sheds and sending some of the workforce to help prepare an airfield 15 miles (24 km) away. However, by January 1942 Charles and Muriel had left the Harcroft Estate, fleeing to Singapore via Kuala Lumpur. Muriel was allowed passage on the last ship out of Singapore in February 1942, which took her to Colombo and then Bombay (now Mumbai). After a short period, she travelled onward to Cape Town, South Africa. She rented an unfurnished self-catering room at the Belmond Mount Nelson Hotel for the rest of the war. Charles had to remain behind and volunteered to help in the auxiliary fire brigade. The Japanese had not expected that they would capture Singapore and were therefore unprepared to run the city, meaning Charles was able to remain in the fire brigade for some months. Eventually, though, he was transferred to the Changi internment camp for civilians (next to the infamous Changi POW camp), where he remained until August 1945. Civilians were allowed one trunk of personal possessions, and Charles packed his trunk full of tinned and dried food, rather than the photos and personal items that most other inmates took. He also followed the advice of the camp doctor to eat the maggots in the food as an extra source of vital protein, rather than pick them out as others did. Due to these factors and good luck he was one of the relatively few who survived to the end of the war. There is a portrait of him by the Russian artist Vladimir Tretchikoff and fellow camp inmate showing his bearded and rather skeletal appearance at the end of the war.

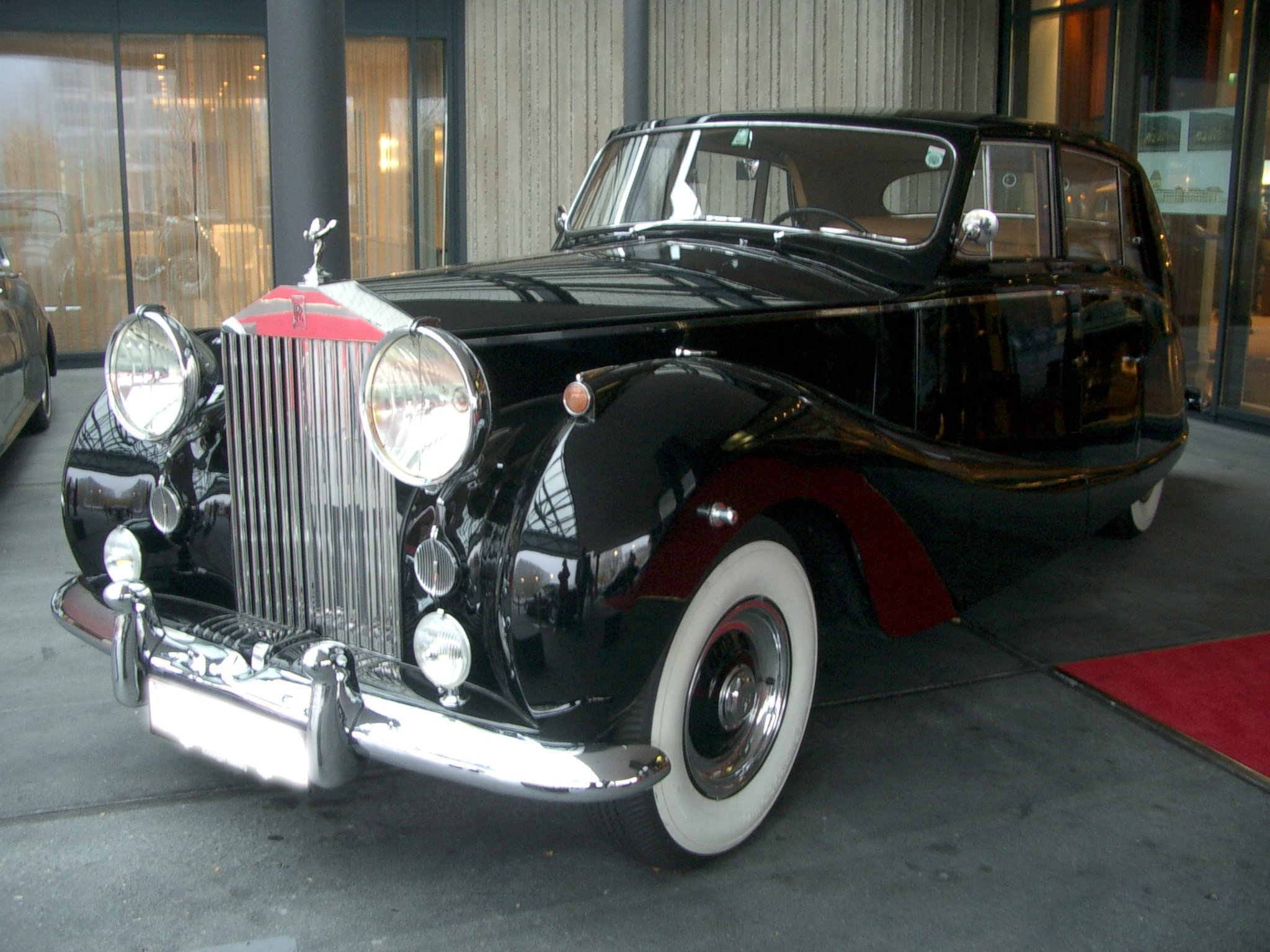
A Rolls-Royce Silver Wraith, similar to that which the Commissioner was killed in

After release by Indian troops in September 1945, it took some time before Charles and Muriel discovered that each other were still alive and were able reunite in Cape Town, before returning to the devastated Harcroft Estate and factory in 1946. However, it was not long before Charles had everything re-equipped and back in production. Post war business was strong enough for him to purchase his first Rolls-Royce in 1947. This car was similar to that of the British High Commissioner of Malaya. During the Malayan Emergency, Charles took the same road through a jungle as the Commissioner, but an hour or two beforehand, on 7 October 1951. Communist insurgents had planned to assassinate the Commissioner and mistook Charles' Rolls-Royce for the official vehicle. As a result, the car was machine gunned, but the driver accelerated away and the occupants survived. The High Commissioner, Sir Henry Gurney, was not so fortunate and was killed when his convoy was brought to a halt by his wounded or dead escorts blocking the road.

== South Africa ==
The guerilla incident convinced Charles that it was time to leave Malaya with the result that the estate was sold, and Charles and Muriel moved to Cape Town. Charles purchased the home of Duncan Baxter (donor of the funds used to build the Baxter Theatre Centre) on 8 March 1951 for £25,000, and promptly renamed it Harcroft (as the Malayan estate had been). From then until his death he was officially retired, but in practice worked hard to manage his considerable investments, add to his collections of mostly oriental art, jade and ivory, and to run and embellish the 24 acres (97,000 m^{2}) of grounds around the house. Amongst the items he collected were two of the four official commemorative paintings done to mark the 1947 Royal Tour of South Africa. Following the accession of the anti-British National Party to power in 1948, the government of the Union of South Africa did not want the paintings. The other two belong to Cape Town City Council.

Charles established a racing stud and was a regular visitor at South African Turf Club race meetings at the Kenilworth and Milnerton race courses. His greatest triumphs were with Prairie Prince winning the Somerset WFA Plate on Saturday 15 February 1969 (trainer J.W.Bell and jockey F.Heyman), the same on Saturday 14 March 1970 (trainer P.Kannemeyer, jockey P.Kruyer), and the Diadem Weight for Age Plate 1000 Metres on 5 December 1970 (trainer P.Kannemeyer, jockey G.Puller). He had previously won the Milnerton Turf Club Steward's Cup with 'Fighter' on 14 January 1961 (trainer J.W.Bell and jockey B.Doo).

His wife Muriel died suddenly in August 1974, an event which was particularly traumatic for Charles. He married long time friend and widow Louise Jackson in 1981. During the 1980s, Charles became a friend of Gerald Durrell, and took an interest in the work of the Jersey Wildlife Trust. Charles donated approximately £4m to finance the construction of a new centre in Jersey (including the Harcroft Lecture Theatre), sponsored conservation work in East Africa, and by the 1990s was supporting work on the preservation of the unique flora and fauna of Madagascar.

== Philanthropy and death ==
Since Rycroft's death from an infection after surgery to fit a pacemaker, the assets of his company (the Harcroft Trust Limited, registered in Jersey) have been administered by his former accountant and advisor Robin Rumboll. The company, now linked to the Harcroft Foundation, continued for a number of years to make donations to the Durrell Wildlife Conservation Trust. The foundation donated a little under £200,000 in 2006 (according to the Durrell Wildlife Trust accounts), but also offered grants to other bodies. However, due to the expense of maintaining his widow Louise at the Harcroft Estate in Constantia, donations ceased.

On his widow's death in 2014, control of the Harcroft Foundation, the Harcroft Trust Ltd and its wholly owned subsidiary Gefac Property Co. Ltd (owner of the Harcroft Estate) passed to Louise Rycroft's daughter Joan Misplon. In November 2019 Cape Town auctioneers Strauss & Co auctioned 558 lots of the contents of Harcroft, with the house, garden and 19 acres also put up for sale. The contents raised some 6 million rand.

== See also ==
- Assassination of Sir Henry Gurney
- Rubber industry in Malaysia
