= Arthur John Davies =

Royal Navy Admiral (1877–1954)

Admiral Sir Arthur John Davies, KBE, CB (26 September 1877 – 13 December 1954) was a Royal Navy officer who served in both world wars.

Despite his age, Davies volunteered for service during the Second World War and served as a convoy commodore in the Royal Naval Reserve from 1940 to 1944, for which he was mentioned in despatches and knighted KBE in 1943.
