= Charles Skerrett =

New Zealand judge

The Honourable Sir Charles Skerrett KCMG KC
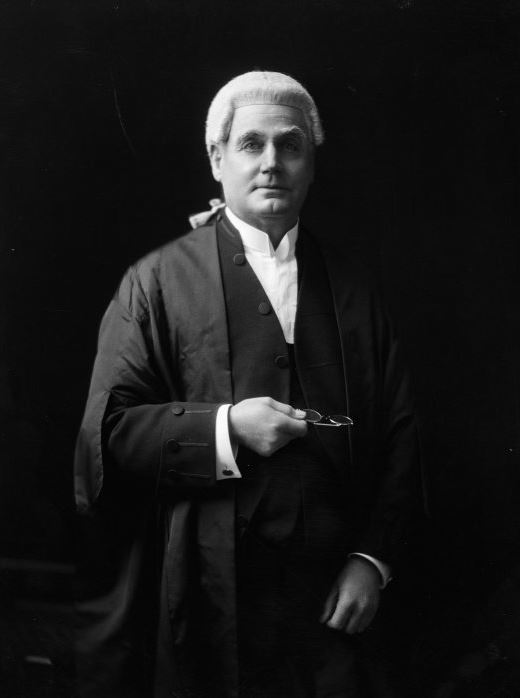

5th Chief Justice of New Zealand
- In office 1 February 1926 – 13 February 1929
- Nominated by: Gordon Coates
- Appointed by: Sir Charles Fergusson
- Preceded by: Robert Stout
- Succeeded by: Michael Myers

Personal details
- Born: 2 September 1863 India, India
- Died: 13 February 1929 (aged 65) at sea

Sir Charles Perrin Skerrett KCMG KC (2 September 1863 – 13 February 1929) was the fifth Chief Justice of New Zealand, from 1926 to 1929.

He was born in India. His father Peter Perrin Skerrett was born in Ireland and descended from the Skerretts of Finavera in County Clare; originally the Skerretts were one of the fourteen Tribes of Galway. He was a sergeant in the Army in India; as he lacked a private income needed by officers.

The family moved to New Zealand when Charles was 12. He was educated at Wellington College. He joined the Post Office, then the Treasury, then to the Department of Justice as a clerk in the Wellington Magistrates' Court.

He was articled to Buller, Lewis & Gully and admitted to the bar in 1884. He went into private practice, and was associated with the Wellington law firms of Skerrett and Wyllie and Chapman Tripp. In 1907 when the first King's Counsel was appointed in New Zealand Skerrett was one of the first to take silk. From 1918 to 1926 he was President of the New Zealand Law Society.

In 1922, in his role as president of the New Zealand Football Association, Skerrett was given the Chatham Cup by Captain Prickett of HMS Chatham as a thank you to New Zealand for its hospitality to the ship and crew.

On 1 February 1926 he was appointed Chief Justice, and was created a Knight Commander of the Order of St Michael and St George in the 1927 New Year Honours.

He left for London in 1929, and died at sea on the Port Denison. He was unmarried.

Legal offices
Preceded by Robert Stout	Chief Justice of New Zealand; 1926–1929	Succeeded by Michael Myers
