= Charles Francis Mott =

English physicist and educator

- Born: 1877; Redhill, Surrey, England
- Died: 1967 (aged 89–90); Cambridge, Cambridgeshire, England
- Occupation: Educator

Charles Francis Mott (1877–1967) the son of Charles Henry Blackshaw Mott was an English physicist and educator, and the father of Nobel laureate Nevill Francis Mott.

In 1901 while at the Cavendish Laboratory he attempted to investigate the field effect following a suggestion from J. J. Thomson. He married Lilian Mary Reynolds, also a researcher at the Cavendish lab.

By 1905 he was the Senior Science Master at Giggleswick School. His wife also taught mathematics there.

From 1922-1945 Mott served as Director of Education in Liverpool. C.F. Mott College of Education was named after him.
