= Giggleswick School =

Public school in North Yorkshire, England

Coordinates: 54°4′21″N 2°17′38″W

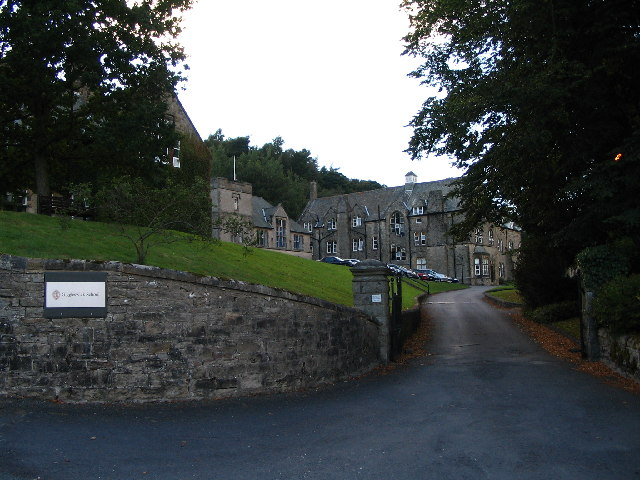
- The entrance of Giggleswick School
- Settle, North Yorkshire, BD24 0DE; England

Information
- Type: Public school Private school Boarding and Day School
- Religious affiliation: Church of England
- Established: 1499; 527 years ago
- Department for Education URN: 121740 Tables
- Headmaster: Sam Hart (senior school); James Mundell (junior school)
- Gender: Coeducational
- Age: 2 to 18
- Enrolment: 464 pupils
- Former pupils: Old Giggleswickians
- School Seal: Latin: Sigillum Prebendarii de Bulidon; Seal of the Prebendary of Bulidon
- Website: www.giggleswick.org.uk

Giggleswick School is a public school (English private boarding and day school) in Giggleswick, near Settle, North Yorkshire, England.

== Early school ==
In 1499, Giggleswick School was founded on half an acre of land leased by the Prior and Convent of Durham, to James Carr, the chantry priest at the parish Church of St Alkelda, to enclose and build, at his own expense, one 'Gramar Scole'. By 1512 the school consisted of two small, irregular buildings, next to the parish church. The school was run by the chantry priests until Edward VI dissolved the position. The school was saved by the petition of the King's Chaplain, John Nowell, and in 1553 it received its royal charter. The charter granted land and endowed it with the title: The Free Grammar School of King Edward the VI of Giggleswick. There is some evidence that there was a school on the same site from an earlier date.

Giggleswick has claims to be one of the oldest public schools, although claims vary depending on the criteria used. In 2012 the school celebrated its 500th anniversary with numerous events throughout the year, including a ball, an outside concert and fireworks display.

== Victorian period ==
The school continued in its original location until 1867, when it moved out of the village centre up the hill to its present location. At this point, a major expansion of the school and its facilities began. Boarding accommodation was added, playing fields were laid out, and new classrooms built.

The only remaining part of the second school, the covered courtyard, was converted into a shooting range, used by the school's Combined Cadet Force contingent and by units of the Territorial Army (Army Reserve).

=== School chapel ===
In 1897, work began on the school chapel, a gift from local landowner and school governor Walter Morrison (MP), which is now a grade II* listed structure. The architect, T.G. Jackson designed the building to Morrison's unusual specifications: a Gothic structure with a dome, that fitted into the surrounding landscape as naturally as possible. It was Morrison's wish that the building should be completely fitted and furnished inside, to allow for no unsympathetic alteration in the future.

The interior was filled with expensive fixtures and fittings. The pews were made of imported cypress wood, the floors covered in marble, and the organ was made by Henry Willis & Sons, a leading organ makers at the time. It was rebuilt in 2005 by GO-Organ Builders Ltd. The chapel's dome was covered in copper which developed a distinctive green verdigris colour, reverting to the original bronze colour after restoration in the late 1990s. The interior of the dome was decorated with mosaics depicting angels playing musical instruments, with the four gospel writers at each corner of the base. The altar furniture is made of sterling silver and Brazilian rosewood. It was presented to the school in memory of Sir Douglas Glover, an old boy and school governor.

== Modern school ==
In the early 1900s William Wyamar Vaughan was headmaster of the school. His wife, Margaret "Madge" Vaughan was the daughter of John Addington Symonds and he was first cousins with Virginia Stephen (later Woolf). Stephen occasionally stayed with the Vaughans at Gigglewick and wrote her first published articles while visiting the school.

In 1934, the school was enlarged by the addition of a preparatory school, Catteral Hall for pupils aged 7–13, a new boarding house was created from the Georgian Beck House in the village (Style House), and in 1966 another boarding house, Morrison, was opened. In the 1980s the school became co-educational.

In the late 1990s a pre-preparatory school, Mill House for children aged 3–7 was opened in the grounds of Catteral Hall, and more recent expansion at the school has created a library, dining hall, sports facilities and science laboratories and refurbished the boarding accommodation.

In the 2000s, Giggleswick School (senior, 13–18), Catteral Hall (prep, 7–13) and Mill House (pre-prep, 2–7) were reorganised to create Giggleswick Junior School (2–11) and Giggleswick School (11–18) under a unified Giggleswick brand.

Giggleswick is one of only 18 schools to possess a Royal Marine cadet force, which became affiliated with HMS Bulwark in the autumn of 2004.

Pupils from the school (and pupils from Cranleigh School and Charterhouse School) operate the manual scoreboards at the Open Championship golf tournament. These pupils receive recognition on television each year from golf broadcaster Peter Alliss, on both the BBC in the UK and on ESPN and ABC in the United States.

In January 2022 a new headmaster, Sam Hart, replaced outgoing headmaster Mark Turnbull.

=== Boarding houses ===
There are four boys' boarding houses:

- Morrison, named after Walter Morrison
- Nowell, named after John Nowell
- Paley, named after William Paley, headmaster at Giggleswick, and father of William Paley
- Shute, named after Josias Shute

Nowell, Paley and Shute are located in the main body of the school (called the Hostel), while Morrison, the most recently built is further from the main school campus. As well, Nowell has recently been refurbished to fit the times.

The two girls' houses are:

- Carr, named after James Carr
- Style, named after George Style

There is a mixed junior boarding house for pupils in years 4–8 which is also the house for day pupils in years 7 & 8, called Catteral House.

=== 1927 eclipse ===
The grounds of Giggleswick School near the chapel were selected as the official observation post for the 1927 solar eclipse from where Sir Frank Watson Dyson, the Astronomer Royal, had an uninterrupted view of the flaming corona of the sun through the 23 seconds of its total eclipse. In 2014 the school was rebuilding its own observatory.

== Notable alumni ==
For notable alumni, sometimes referred to as Old Giggleswickians, see Category:People educated at Giggleswick School including:

- James Agate (1877–1947), diarist and theatre critic
- Stefan Allesch-Taylor (b. 1969) financier, serial entrepreneur and philanthropist
- Noel Birch (1865–1939), soldier; aide-de-camp to King George V
- Rudolph Anstead (1876–1962), cricketer and botanist/horticulturist
- Clarence Blakiston (1864–1943), actor and singer
- Jon Blundy (b. 1961), geologist, professor of petrology at University of Bristol
- Oliver Bodington (1859–1936), president of the British Chamber of Commerce
- James Bowden (1931–2002), England and Great Britain Rugby League international
- Duncan Cumming (1903–1979), governor of Kordofan Province, Sudan, president of the Royal Geographical Society
- Anthony Daniels (b. 1946), actor who played the android C-3PO in 11 Star Wars films
- Charles Darbishire (1875–1925), East Indian merchant and Liberal MP
- Keith Duckworth (1933–2005), engineer, joint founder of Cosworth Engineering
- John Flint (b. 1968), group CEO of HSBC
- Sarah Fox, operatic soprano
- William Gaunt (b. 1937), actor
- Douglas Glover (1908–1982), Conservative MP
- Douglas Hacking 1st Lord Hacking (1884–1950), Conservative MP
- Graham Hamilton (JGH McOwat) (b.1944), actor and president of Equity, the actors' union
- John Hare (1844–1921), actor/manager of the Garrick Theatre
- George Howson (1860–1919), reforming headmaster of Gresham's School
- John Saul Howson (1815–1885), theologian
- James Jakes (b. 1987), IndyCar & W.E.C. driver
- Thomas Kidd (1770–1850), classical scholar
- John Langhorne (1836–1911), educationist; headmaster of the King's School, Rochester
- Arnold Leese (1877–1956), British fascist
- Henry Maudsley (1835–1918), founder, Maudsley Hospital
- Henry Mercer (1872–1949), academic dean of Perth, convicted fraudster
- Joe Mycock (1914–2004), England rugby captain
- Oswald Nock (1904–1994), railway historian
- William Paley (1743–1805), theologian
- Gustav Renwick (1883–1956), industrialist; MP
- Nigel Roebuck (b. 1946), journalist
- Charles Rycroft (1901–1998), businessman, philanthropist
- Harry Norton Schofield VC (1865–1931), soldier
- Tom Skeffington-Lodge (1905–1994), Labour MP
- Ian William Murison Smith (1937—2016), professor of chemistry at the University of Birmingham
- Matthew Smith (1879–1959), artist
- John Sykes (b. 1956), Conservative MP for Scarborough (1992–97)
- Matthew William Thompson (1820–1891), Liberal MP, mayor of Bradford; chairman of the Midland Railway
- Charles Tweedale (1865–1944), minister and spiritualist
- Henry Hulme Warburton (1819–1903), physician, early settler in California
- Richard Whiteley, (1943–2005), journalist and television presenter (Countdown and Calendar)
- Gary Wolstenholme (b. 1960), golfer
- Robert Wynne-Edwards (1897–1974), British Army officer; civil engineer

== Headmasters ==
- 1499–1518 James Carr, Founder of the Rood Chantry
- 1548–1560 Richard Carr, Incumbent of the Rood Chantry
- 1615–1619 Christopher Shute, Vicar of Giggleswick, 1576–1626
- 1619–1641 Robert Dockray, Vicar of Giggleswick, 1632–1641
- 1642–1647 Rowland Lucas
- 1648–1656 William Walker
- 1656-1656 William Bradley (Temporary)
- 1656–1684 William Briggs
- 1684-1684 John Parkinson
- 1685–1712 John Armitstead
- 1712–1744 John Carr
- 1744–1799 William Paley (& father of the namesake alumnus theologian)
- 1800–1844 Rowland Ingram
- 1846–1858 George Ash Butterton
- 1858–1866 John Richard Blakiston
- 1866–1867 Thomas Bramley (Provisional)
- 1867–1869 Michael Forster (Provisional)
- 1869–1904 George Style
- 1904–1910 William Wyamar Vaughan
- 1910–1931 Robert Noel Douglas
- 1931–1955 E. H. Partridge
- 1956–1960 Niale Shane Trevor Benson
- 1961–1970 Owen John Tressider Rowe
- 1970–1978 Richard Creed Meredith
- 1978–1986 Ian Watson
- 1986–1993 Peter Hobson
- 1993–2001 Anthony Millard
- 2001–2014 Geoffrey Boult
- 2014–2022 Mark Turnbull
- 2022– Sam Hart (from January 2022)

== Notable former masters ==
- David Chapman — physical chemist
- David E. W. Morgan — re-established the Careers Department, served as head of Modern Languages for 38 years
- Robert Noel Douglas — cricketer for Surrey and Middlesex
- Ronald Eyre — theatre director, writer and actor
- Russell Harty — Television presenter and chat show host in the 1980s, taught English at the school
- William Wyamar Vaughan — headmaster, a position he later held at Wellington and Rugby schools
- Charles Francis Mott — director of education at Liverpool

== See also ==
- List of the oldest schools in the United Kingdom
- Listed buildings in Giggleswick
