= List of churches in the Anglican Diocese of Leeds =

The following is a list of churches in the Anglican Diocese of Leeds.

== Archdeaconries and deaneries ==
| Episcopal area | Archdeaconries | Rural Deaneries | Paid clergy | Churches | Population | People/clergy | People/church | Churches/clergy |
|---|---|---|---|---|---|---|---|---|
| Bradford Episcopal Area (area Bishop of Bradford) | Archdeaconry of Bradford | Deanery of Aire & Worth | 18.5 | 29 | 143,866 | 7,777 | 4,961 | 1.57 |
| Bradford Episcopal Area (area Bishop of Bradford) | Archdeaconry of Bradford | Deanery of Inner Bradford | 16.5* | 18* | 175,979* | 10,665 | 9,777 | 1.09 |
| Bradford Episcopal Area (area Bishop of Bradford) | Archdeaconry of Bradford | Deanery of Outer Bradford | 19 | 22 | 177,757 | 9,356 | 8,080 | 1.16 |
| Bradford Episcopal Area (area Bishop of Bradford) | Archdeaconry of Bradford | Deanery of South Craven & Wharfedale | 12 | 13 | 53,328 | 4,444 | 4,102 | 1.08 |
| Huddersfield Episcopal Area (area Bishop of Huddersfield) | Archdeaconry of Halifax | Deanery of Almondbury | 6 | 16 | 73,391 | 12,232 | 4,587 | 2.67 |
| Huddersfield Episcopal Area (area Bishop of Huddersfield) | Archdeaconry of Halifax | Deanery of Dewsbury & Birstall | 15 | 30 | 184,049 | 12,269 | 6,135 | 2 |
| Huddersfield Episcopal Area (area Bishop of Huddersfield) | Archdeaconry of Halifax | Deanery of Brighouse & Elland | 9 | 17 | 67,559 | 7,507 | 3,974 | 1.89 |
| Huddersfield Episcopal Area (area Bishop of Huddersfield) | Archdeaconry of Halifax | Deanery of Calder Valley | 3 | 11 | 40,260 | 13,420 | 3,660 | 3.67 |
| Huddersfield Episcopal Area (area Bishop of Huddersfield) | Archdeaconry of Halifax | Deanery of Halifax | 14 | 16 | 91,155 | 6,511 | 5,697 | 1.14 |
| Huddersfield Episcopal Area (area Bishop of Huddersfield) | Archdeaconry of Halifax | Deanery of Huddersfield | 10 | 19 | 108,820 | 10,882 | 5,727 | 1.9 |
| Huddersfield Episcopal Area (area Bishop of Huddersfield) | Archdeaconry of Halifax | Deanery of Kirkburton | 10 | 20 | 55,470 | 5,547 | 2,774 | 2 |
| Leeds Episcopal Area (area Bishop of Kirkstall) | Archdeaconry of Leeds | Deanery of Allerton | 15 | 19 | 146,872 | 9,791 | 7,730 | 1.27 |
| Leeds Episcopal Area (area Bishop of Kirkstall) | Archdeaconry of Leeds | Deanery of Armley | 19 | 29 | 239,414 | 12,601 | 8,256 | 1.53 |
| Leeds Episcopal Area (area Bishop of Kirkstall) | Archdeaconry of Leeds | Deanery of Headingley | 19 | 21 | 180,799 | 9,516 | 8,609 | 1.11 |
| Leeds Episcopal Area (area Bishop of Kirkstall) | Archdeaconry of Leeds | Deanery of Whitkirk | 15 | 18 | 147,203 | 9,814 | 8,178 | 1.2 |
| Wakefield Episcopal Area (area Bishop of Wakefield) | Archdeaconry of Pontefract | Deanery of Barnsley | 12 | 21 | 123,937 | 10,328 | 5,902 | 1.75 |
| Wakefield Episcopal Area (area Bishop of Wakefield) | Archdeaconry of Pontefract | Deanery of Pontefract | 16 | 30 | 151,482 | 9,468 | 5,049 | 1.88 |
| Wakefield Episcopal Area (area Bishop of Wakefield) | Archdeaconry of Pontefract | Deanery of Wakefield | 26* | 31* | 177,831* | 6,840 | 5,736 | 1.19 |
| Ripon Episcopal Area (area Bishop of Ripon) | Archdeaconry of Richmond & Craven | Deanery of Bowland & Ewecross | 9 | 25 | 19,007 | 2,112 | 760 | 2.78 |
| Ripon Episcopal Area (area Bishop of Ripon) | Archdeaconry of Richmond & Craven | Deanery of Harrogate | 21 | 41 | 122,920 | 5,853 | 2,998 | 1.95 |
| Ripon Episcopal Area (area Bishop of Ripon) | Archdeaconry of Richmond & Craven | Deanery of Richmond | 11 | 44 | 47,485 | 4,317 | 1,079 | 4 |
| Ripon Episcopal Area (area Bishop of Ripon) | Archdeaconry of Richmond & Craven | Deanery of Ripon | 12* | 53* | 46,939* | 3,912 | 886 | 4.42 |
| Ripon Episcopal Area (area Bishop of Ripon) | Archdeaconry of Richmond & Craven | Deanery of Skipton | 10 | 23 | 41,123 | 4,112 | 1,788 | 2.3 |
| Ripon Episcopal Area (area Bishop of Ripon) | Archdeaconry of Richmond & Craven | Deanery of Wensley | 5 | 36 | 25,765 | 5,153 | 716 | 7.2 |
| Total/average | | | 323 | 602 | 2,642,411 | 8,181 | 4,389 | 1.86 |

*including a Cathedral

== Churches ==
=== Outside deanery structures ===
| Benefice | Church | Link | Founded (building) | Clergy | Pop. served |
|---|---|---|---|---|---|
| Cathedra (Bradford) | Cathedral of St Peter, Bradford | | Ancient (Medieval) | 3 | 2,256 |
| Cathedra (Ripon) | Cathedral of SS Peter & Wilfrid, Ripon | | Ancient (Medieval) | 4 | 13,341 |
| Cathedra (Ripon) | Chapel of St John the Baptist, Ripon | | mid C19th | 4 | 13,341 |
| Cathedra (Ripon) | Chapel of St Mary Magdalen, Ripon | | Medieval | 4 | 13,341 |
| Cathedra (Ripon) | St Michael & All Angels, Littlethorpe | | 1878 | 4 | 13,341 |
| Cathedra (Ripon) | St John the Baptist, Bishop Monkton | | Medieval (1879) | 4 | 13,341 |
| Cathedra (Ripon) | St Leonard, Burton Leonard | | Medieval (1878) | 4 | 13,341 |
| Cathedra (Ripon) | St John the Evangelist, Sharow | | 1825 | 4 | 13,341 |
| Cathedra (Ripon) | Holy Innocents, Copt Hewick | | 1876 | 4 | 13,341 |
| Cathedra (Wakefield) | Cathedral of All Saints, Wakefield | | Ancient (Medieval) | 5 | 1,512 |
| Cathedra (Wakefield) | Chantry Chapel of St Mary, Wakefield | | Medieval | 5 | 1,512 |

=== Deanery of Aire and Worth ===
| Benefice | Churches | Link | Clergy | Population served | Ref |
|---|---|---|---|---|---|
| Baildon (St John the Evangelist) (St Hugh Mission Church) (St James) | St John the Evangelist, Baildon; St Hugh's Mission Church, Baildon; St James, Baildon | | Vicar: Sandra Benham; Curate: Ruth Yeoman | 16,706 | |
| Bingley (All Saints) | All Saints, Bingley | | Vicar: Martyn Weaver; Assistant Priest: Ruth Dowson | 11,099 | |
| Bingley (All Saints) | The Eldwick Church (CoE/Meth) | | Vicar: Martyn Weaver; Assistant Priest: Ruth Dowson | 11,099 | |
| Bingley (Holy Trinity) | Holy Trinity, Bingley (1868); St Wilfrid, Gilstead (1886) | | Vicar: Andrew Clarke | 7,120 | |
| Cottingley (St Michael and All Angels) | St Michael & All Angels, Cottingley | | Vicar: Vacant | 5,461 | |
| Harden (St Saviour) and Wilsden, Cullingworth and Denholme | St Saviour, Harden (1865) | | Team Rector: Vacant; Team Vicar: Suzy McCarter; NSM: Liz Moy | 12,480 | |
| Harden (St Saviour) and Wilsden, Cullingworth and Denholme | St Matthew, Wilsden (1826) | | Team Rector: Vacant; Team Vicar: Suzy McCarter; NSM: Liz Moy | 12,480 | |
| Harden (St Saviour) and Wilsden, Cullingworth and Denholme | St John the Evangelist, Cullingworth | | Team Rector: Vacant; Team Vicar: Suzy McCarter; NSM: Liz Moy | 12,480 | |
| Harden (St Saviour) and Wilsden, Cullingworth and Denholme | Denholme Shared Church (1843) | | Team Rector: Vacant; Team Vicar: Suzy McCarter; NSM: Liz Moy | 12,480 | |
| Haworth (St Michael and All Angels) and Cross Roads Cum Lees | St Michael & All Angels, Haworth (MED); St Gabriel, Stanbury (1848); St James, Cross Roads cum Lees | | Rector: Peter Mullins; Curate: Anthony Bennett | 6,888 | |
| Ingrow (St John the Evangelist) With Hainworth | St John the Evangelist, Ingrow | | Vicar: Vacant | 13,157 | |
| Keighley (All Saints) (St Andrew) | Keighley Shared Church (CoE/Meth) | | Team Rector: Michael Cansdale; Team Vicar: Natasha Thomas; Team Vicar: Vacant; Curate: Tracey Raistrick; NSM: John Long; NSM: John Ineson; Hon. Curate: Malcolm Foy | 29,992 | |
| Keighley (All Saints) (St Andrew) | St Mark, Utley | | Team Rector: Michael Cansdale; Team Vicar: Natasha Thomas; Team Vicar: Vacant; Curate: Tracey Raistrick; NSM: John Long; NSM: John Ineson; Hon. Curate: Malcolm Foy | 29,992 | |
| Keighley (All Saints) (St Andrew) | All Saints, Keighley; St Barnabas, Thwaites Brow | | Team Rector: Michael Cansdale; Team Vicar: Natasha Thomas; Team Vicar: Vacant; Curate: Tracey Raistrick; NSM: John Long; NSM: John Ineson; Hon. Curate: Malcolm Foy | 29,992 | |
| Morton (St Luke) and Riddlesden | St Luke, East Morton | | Vicar: Tony Walker; NSM: Jenny Ramsden | 8,042 | |
| Morton (St Luke) and Riddlesden | St Mary the Virgin, Riddlesden | | Vicar: Tony Walker; NSM: Jenny Ramsden | 8,042 | |
| Oakworth (Christ Church) | Christ Church, Oakworth; St John, Newsholme | | Vicar: Vacant; NSM: Bryony Partridge | 5,139 | |
| Oxenhope (St Mary the Virgin) | St Mary the Virgin, Oxenhope | | Vicar: Cat Thatcher; NSM: Julie Roberts (see above) | 3,048 | |
| Shipley (St Paul) | St Paul, Shipley (1826) | | Vicar: Vacant; NSM: John Butler | 5,734 | |
| Shipley (St Peter) | St Peter, Shipley | | Vicar: John Rainer | 6,730 | |
| Steeton (St Stephen) | St Stephen, Steeton with Eastburn (1869) | | Vicar: Vacant | 4,387 | |
| Windhill (Christ Church) | Christ Church, Windhill (CoE/Meth) | | Priest-in-Charge: Mark Watson | 7,883 | |

=== Deanery of Inner Bradford ===
| Benefice | Churches | Link | Clergy | Population served | Ref |
|---|---|---|---|---|---|
| Bankfoot (St Matthew) and Bowling St Stephen | St Matthew, Bankfoot | | Vicar: Jimmy Hinton; Curate: Stephen Treasure (see below); Curate: Hannah Raitt | 16,276 | |
| Bankfoot (St Matthew) and Bowling St Stephen | St Stephen, Bowling | | Vicar: Jimmy Hinton; Curate: Stephen Treasure (see below); Curate: Hannah Raitt | 16,276 | |
| Bowling (St John) | St John, Bowling | | Priest-in-Charge: Tim Thomas; NSM: Chris Barnes | 5,580 | |
| Bradford (St Augustine) (St Clement) | St Augustine, Bradford | | Vicar: Rosy Fairhurst | 22,500 | |
| Bradford (St Augustine) (St Clement) | St Clement, Bradford | | Vicar: Rosy Fairhurst | 22,500 | |
| Bradford (St Wilfrid) (St Columba with St Andrew) | St Wilfrid, Lidget Green | | Vicar: Vacant; Curate: John Bavington (see below) | 17,365 | |
| Frizinghall (St Margaret) | St Margaret, Frizinghall | | Priest-in-Charge: Vacant | 4,981 | |
| Girlington (St Philip), Heaton and Manningham | St Philip, Girlington; St Barnabas, Heaton; St Martin, Heaton; SS Paul & Jude, Manningham | | Rector: Vacant; Curate: Christopher Chorlton; Curate: Sue Jennings; Hon. Curate: Denise Poole | 47,253 | |
| Horton, Great (St John the Evangelist) | St John the Evangelist, Great Horton | | Vicar: John Bavington; Curate: Nathanael Poole; Curate: Adam Dickson | 14,303 | |
| Horton, Little (All Saints) (St Oswald) | All Saints, Little Horton; St Oswald, Chapel Green | | Vicar: Stephen Treasure; Curate: Jimmy Hinton (see above); Curate: Jenny Green; Curate: Derek Jones; NSM: Mark Malek | 22,019 | |
| Thornbury (St Margaret), Woodhall and Waterloo | St Margaret, Thornbury; St James the Great, Woodhall | | Vicar: Nicholas Clews; NSM: Robert Johnson | 16,975 | |
| Toller Lane (St Chad) | St Chad, Toller Lane (1904) | | Vicar: Liam Beadle | 6,471 | |

=== Deanery of Outer Bradford ===
| Benefice | Churches | Link | Clergy | Population served | Ref |
|---|---|---|---|---|---|
| Allerton (St Peter) (St Francis of Assisi) | St Peter, Allerton (1876); St Francis of Assisi, Allerton | | Vicar: George Williams | 10,650 | |
| Bierley (St John the Evangelist) | St John the Evangelist, Bierley | | Vicar: Paul Wheelhouse | 7,161 | |
| Bolton (St James with St Chrysostom) | St James, Bolton | | Vicar: Stephen Lees; Hon. Curate: Peter Stoodley | 9,889 | |
| Clayton (St John the Baptist) | St John the Baptist, Clayton | | Vicar: Vaughan Pollard; Curate: Timothy Roberts | 9,467 | |
| Eccleshill (St Luke) | St Luke, Eccleshill | | Vicar: John Hartley | 14,942 | |
| Fairweather Green (St Saviour) | St Saviour, Fairweather Green | | Vicar: Dorothy Stewart | 7,415 | |
| Greengates (St John the Evangelist) and Thorpe Edge | St John the Evangelist, Greengates | | Vicar: Mary Winter; NSM: Steven Nuttall | 10,643 | |
| Greengates (St John the Evangelist) and Thorpe Edge | St John the Divine, Thorpe Edge | | Vicar: Mary Winter; NSM: Steven Nuttall | 10,643 | |
| Idle (Holy Trinity) | Holy Trinity, Idle | | Vicar: Jim Taylor; Curate: Olan Laotan | 11,467 | |
| Low Moor (Holy Trinity) and Oakenshaw | Holy Trinity, Low Moor (1606); St Andrew, Oakenshaw cum Woodlands (1873) | | Vicar: Ian Jennings; NSM: Dorothy Ellis | 8,776 | |
| Queensbury (Holy Trinity) | Holy Trinity, Queensbury | | Vicar: Stephen Gott; NSM: Sandra Neale | 9,878 | |
| Shelf (St Michael and All Angels) with Buttershaw St Aidan | St Michael & All Angels, Shelf; St Aidan, Buttershaw | | Team Vicar: Andrew Greiff | 20,412 | |
| Thornton (St James) | St James, Thornton | | Vicar: Harry Gwinnett; NSM: Gloria Hardisty | 7,602 | |
| Tong (St James) and Laisterdyke | St James, Tong; St Christopher, Holme Wood; St Mary, Laisterdyke | | Rector: Gary Hodgson; Curate: Helen Hodgson; Curate: Philippa Slingsby | 20,538 | |
| Wibsey (St Paul) | St Paul, Wibsey (1838) | | Vicar: Thierry Guillemin | 8,286 | |
| Wrose (St Cuthbert) | St Cuthbert, Wrose | | Vicar: Colin Blake; Hon. Curate: Peter Stoodley | 9,878 | |
| Wyke (St Mary the Virgin) | St Mary the Virgin, Wyke (1847) | | Vicar: Vacant; Hon. Curate: Margaret Lyons | 10,753 | |

=== Deanery of South Craven and Wharfedale ===
| Benefice | Churches | Link | Clergy | Founded (building) | Population served | Ref |
|---|---|---|---|---|---|---|
| Addingham (St Peter) | St Peter, Addingham | | Rector: Jill Perrett; NSM: Barbara Clarke; Hon. Curate: Paul Summers | | 3,730 | |
| Ben Rhydding (St John the Evangelist) | St John the Evangelist, Ben Rhydding | | Vicar: Peter Willox; NSM: Janette Copsey | | 3,947 | |
| Burley in Wharfedale (St Mary the Virgin) | St Mary the Virgin, Burley-in-Wharfedale | | Vicar: Alastair Kirk | | 6,972 | |
| Cononley (St John the Evangelist) with Bradley Kildwick (St Andrew) | St John the Evangelist, Cononley; St Mary, Bradley; St Andrew, Kildwick | | Vicar: Mike Green | St Johns: 1864 St Marys: 1963 St Andrews: Ancient | 5,086 | |
| Ilkley (All Saints) | All Saints, Ilkley | | Vicar: Michael Coe; NSM: Pat Reid; NSM: Richard Watson | | 5,779 | |
| Ilkley (St Margaret) | St Margaret, Ilkley | | Vicar: Philip Gray | | 5,364 | |
| Menston (St John the Divine) with Woodhead | St John the Divine, Menston | | Vicar: Stephen Proudlove; NSM: Andrew Howorth | | 5,626 | |
| Silsden (St James) | St James, Silsden | | Vicar: David Griffiths; Curate: Susan Griffiths | | 8,257 | |
| Sutton (St Thomas) with Cowling and Lothersdale | St Thomas, Sutton-in-Craven; Holy Trinity, Cowling; Christ Church, Lothersdale | | Vicar: Helen Collings; Curate: Brian Greenfield | | 8,567 | |

=== Deanery of Almondbury ===
| Benefice | Churches | Link | Clergy | Population served | Ref |
|---|---|---|---|---|---|
| Almondbury (St Michael and St Helen) (St Mary) (All Hallows) with Farnley Tyas | SS Michael & Helen, Almondbury; All Hallows, Almondbury; St Lucius, Farnley Tyas | | Team Rector: Mark Zammit; Curate: Andrew Steer; NSM: Margaret Fossey; NSM: Jessica Malay | 11,662 | |
| Honley (St Mary) | St Mary, Honley; St George, Brockholes | | Vicar: Vacant | 7,736 | |
| Kirkheaton (St John the Baptist) | St John the Baptist, Kirkheaton; St Bartholomew, Grange Moor | | Rector: Ian Jones | 14,889 | |
| Meltham Christ the King (St Bartholomew) (St James) | Christ Church, Helme; St Bartholomew, Meltham; St James, Meltham Mills; St Mary, Wilshaw | | Vicar: John Dracup; NSM: Peter Rolls; NSM: Dennis Shields; OLM: John Radcliffe | 8,431 | |
| Moldgreen (Christ Church) and Rawthorpe St James | Christ Church, Moldgreen; St James, Rawthorpe | | Priest-in-Charge: Charlotte Cheshire | 8,487 | |
| Newsome (St John the Evangelist) and Armitage Bridge and South Crosland | St John the Evangelist, Newsome; St Paul, Armitage Bridge; Holy Trinity, South Crosland | | Priest-in-Charge: Julie Anderson; NSM: David Kent; OLM: Cynthia Sykes | 22,186 | |

=== Deanery of Dewsbury & Birstall ===
| Benefice | Churches | Link | Clergy | Population served | Ref |
|---|---|---|---|---|---|
| Birkenshaw (St Paul) with Hunsworth | St Paul, Birkenshaw; St Luke, East Bierley | | Priest-in-Charge: Karen Nicholl | 9,027 | |
| Birstall (St Peter) | St Peter, Birstall | | Vicar: Jessica Davis | 5,490 | |
| Brownhill (St Saviour) | St Saviour, Brownhill | | Vicar: Lesley Mattacks | 7,444 | |
| Cleckheaton (St Luke) (St John the Evangelist) (Whitechapel) | St Luke, Cleckheaton; St John the Evangelist, Cleckheaton; Whitechapel, Cleckheaton | | Vicar: Brunel James; NSM: Rachel Cave; NSM: Jack Parkes | 10,040 | |
| Gomersal (St Mary) | St Mary the Virgin, Gomersal | | Vicar: Karen Nicholl | 6,920 | |
| Hartshead (St Peter), Hightown, Roberttown and Scholes | St Peter, Hartshead; All Saints, Roberttown; SS Philip & James, Scholes | | Vicar: Richard Burge; NSM: Stephen Rochell; NSM: Susan Holt; OLM: Jayne Lee | 11,254 | |
| Heckmondwike (All Souls) (St James) (W Norristhorpe) and Liversedge | St James, Heckmondwike; Christ Church, Liversedge | | Vicar: Karen Young; NSM: Susan Holt (see above); OLM: Jayne Lee (see above) | 22,291 | |
| Batley (All Saints) (St Thomas) | All Saints, Batley | | Vicar: Vacant; Curate: Mark Umpleby | 23,267 | |
| Batley (All Saints) (St Thomas) | St Thomas the Apostle, Batley | | Vicar: Vacant; Curate: Mark Umpleby | 23,267 | |
| Batley (All Saints) (St Thomas) | St Paul, Hanging Heaton | | Vicar: Vacant; Curate: Mark Umpleby | 23,267 | |
| Batley (All Saints) (St Thomas) | St Andrew, Purlwell | | Vicar: Vacant; Curate: Mark Umpleby | 23,267 | |
| Battyeford (Christ the King) | Christ the King, Battyeford | | Vicar: Margaret McLean; NSM: Michael Wood | 7,683 | |
| Dewsbury (All Saints) (St Mark) (St Matthew and St John the Baptist) | Minster of All Saints, Dewsbury; Holy Trinity, Batley Carr; St John the Evangelist, Dewsbury Moor | | Team Rector: Simon Cash; Curate: Neil Walpole; NSM: Heather Thurlow | 28,071 | |
| Mirfield (St Mary) | St Mary the Virgin, Mirfield; St John the Evangelist, Upper Hopton | | Vicar: Hugh Baker; SSM: Helen Butler | 12,022 | |
| Ravensthorpe (St Saviour) and Thornhill Lees with Savile Town | St Saviour, Ravensthorpe; Holy Innocents, Thornhill Lees | | Priest-in-Charge: Vacant | 17,587 | |
| Staincliffe (Christ Church) and Carlinghow | Christ Church, Staincliffe | | Vicar: Vacant; Hon. Curate: Malcolm Inman | 14,516 | |
| Staincliffe (Christ Church) and Carlinghow | St John the Evangelist, Carlinghow | | Vicar: Vacant; Hon. Curate: Malcolm Inman | 14,516 | |
| Thornhill (St Michael and All Angels) and Whitley Lower | St Michael & All Angels, Thornhill; SS Mary & Michael, Whitley Lower | | Rector: Deborah Horsfall | 8,437 | |

=== Deanery of Brighouse and Elland ===
| Benefice | Churches | Link | Clergy | Population served | Ref |
|---|---|---|---|---|---|
| Barkisland (Christ Church) with West Scammonden | Christ Church, Barkisland | | Vicar: Chris Ball; NSM: Carol Hirst | 7,047 | |
| Barkisland (Christ Church) with West Scammonden | St Bartholomew, West Scammonden | | Vicar: Chris Ball; NSM: Carol Hirst | 7,047 | |
| Ripponden (St Bartholomew) | St Bartholomew, Ripponden | | Vicar: Chris Ball; NSM: Carol Hirst | 7,047 | |
| Ripponden (St Bartholomew) | St John the Divine, Rishworth | | Vicar: Chris Ball; NSM: Carol Hirst | 7,047 | |
| Brighouse (St Martin) and Clifton | St Martin, Brighouse | | Vicar: Paul Webb | 8,879 | |
| Brighouse (St Martin) and Clifton | St John the Evangelist, Clifton | | Vicar: Paul Webb | 8,879 | |
| Coley (St John the Baptist) | St John the Baptist, Coley | | Priest-in-Charge: James Allison | 2,885 | |
| Elland (All Saints) (St Mary the Virgin) | All Saints, Elland; St Mary the Virgin, Elland | | Rector: David Burrows; Curate: Rodney Chapman (see below); OLM: Philip Chadwick | 9,981 | |
| Greetland (St Thomas) and West Vale | St Thomas, Greetland and West Vale | | Priest-in-Charge: Lesley Cheetham; Curate: David Burrows (see above) | 6,031 | |
| Lightcliffe (St Matthew) and Hove Edge | St Matthew, Lightcliffe; St Chad, Hove Edge | | Vicar: Kathryn Buck | 9,994 | |
| Northowram (St Matthew) | St Matthew, Northowram | | Vicar: Catherine Barnard; Curate: James Allison (see above) | 4,871 | |
| Rastrick (St John the Divine) (St Matthew) | St John the Divine, Rastrick | | Vicar: Marion Russell; NSM: Stephen Hannam | 12,672 | |
| Rastrick (St John the Divine) (St Matthew) | St Matthew, Rastrick (CoE/Meth) | | Vicar: Marion Russell; NSM: Stephen Hannam | 12,672 | |
| Stainland (St Andrew) and Outlane | St Andrew, Stainland | | Vicar: Rodney Chapman; Curate: David Burrows (see above) | 5,199 | |
| Stainland (St Andrew) and Outlane | St Mary Magdalene, Outlane | | Vicar: Rodney Chapman; Curate: David Burrows (see above) | 5,199 | |

=== Deanery of Calder Valley ===
| Benefice | Churches | Link | Clergy | Population served | Ref |
|---|---|---|---|---|---|
| Erringden, Comprising Cragg Vale and Mytholmroyd | St John the Baptist in the Wilderness, Cragg Vale; St Michael, Mytholmroyd | | Vicar: Catherine Reardon; NSM: Martin Macdonald; NSM: Marcus Bull | 5,327 | |
| Hebden Bridge (St James) and Heptonstall | St James, Hebden Bridge | | Vicar: Vacant | 8,504 | |
| Hebden Bridge (St James) and Heptonstall | St Thomas the Apostle, Heptonstall | | Vicar: Vacant | 8,504 | |
| Luddenden (St Mary) with Luddenden Foot | St Mary, Luddenden | | Priest-in-Charge: Ian Sparks; NSM: Martin Macdonald | 3,896 | |
| Ryburn Benefice, the (Cottonstones, Norland and Sowerby) | St Mary, Cottonstones; St Luke, Norland; St Peter, Sowerby | | Vicar: Jeanette Roberts; Curate: Ian Sparks (see above); NSM: Lesley Ennis | 7,073 | |
| Todmorden (St Mary) with Cornholme and Walsden | St Mary, Todmorden; St Peter, Walsden | | Hon. Priest-in-Charge: Dr Catherine Shelley | 15,460 | |

=== Deanery of Halifax ===
| Benefice | Churches | Link | Clergy | Population served | Ref |
|---|---|---|---|---|---|
| Bradshaw (St John the Evangelist) and Holmfield | St John the Evangelist, Bradshaw | | Vicar: Katia Shoesmith; Curate: Jen Clarke; NSM: Sue Heptinstall | 6,388 | |
| Bradshaw (St John the Evangelist) and Holmfield | St Andrew, Holmfield | | Vicar: Katia Shoesmith; Curate: Jen Clarke; NSM: Sue Heptinstall | 6,388 | |
| Halifax (All Saints) | All Saints, Salterhebble | | Vicar: Stephen Lees | 5,484 | |
| Halifax (Holy Trinity) (St Jude) | Holy Trinity & St Jude, Halifax | | Vicar: Richard Frith; Curate: Michelle Petch | 7,737 | |
| Halifax (St John the Baptist) (All Souls) with Siddal | Minster of St John the Baptist, Halifax; St Mark, Siddal | | Vicar: Hilary Barber; Curate: Linda Maslen; Curate: Jane Finn; NSM: Simon Scott; Lecturer (NSM): David Simon | 9,701 | |
| Halifax St Augustine (School Hall) and Mount Pellon | St Augustine, Halifax | | Vicar: John Hellewell; Curate: Linda Maslen (see above) | 14,063 | |
| Halifax St Augustine (School Hall) and Mount Pellon | Christ Church, Pellon | | Vicar: John Hellewell; Curate: Linda Maslen (see above) | 14,063 | |
| King Cross (St Paul) | St Paul, King Cross | | Vicar: Kevin Barnard | 8,011 | |
| Mixenden (Holy Nativity) and Illingworth | Holy Nativity, Mixenden & Illingworth | | Vicar: Robb Sutherland; NSM: Yvonne Hagan | 11,183 | |
| Ovenden (St George) | St George the Martyr, Ovenden | | Vicar: Gordon Barley; NSM: Glenn Roper | 6,961 | |
| Southowram (St Anne-In-The-Grove) and Claremount | St Anne-in-the-Grove, Southowram | | Curate: Katia Shoesmith (see above); Curate: Kevin Barnard (see above); NSM: Edmund Kilpatrick | 4,975 | |
| Southowram (St Anne-In-The-Grove) and Claremount | St Thomas the Apostle, Claremount | | Curate: Katia Shoesmith (see above); Curate: Kevin Barnard (see above); NSM: Edmund Kilpatrick | 4,975 | |
| Sowerby Bridge (Christ Church) | Christ Church, Sowerby Bridge | | Vicar: Angela Dick | 6,664 | |
| Warley (St John the Evangelist) and Halifax St Hilda | St John the Evangelist, Warley | | Vicar: Caroline Greenwood | 9,988 | |
| Warley (St John the Evangelist) and Halifax St Hilda | St Hilda, Halifax | | Vicar: Caroline Greenwood | 9,988 | |

=== Deanery of Huddersfield ===
| Benefice | Churches | Link | Clergy | Population served | Ref |
|---|---|---|---|---|---|
| Birkby (St Cuthbert) Huddersfield and Birchencliffe | St Philip the Apostle, Birchencliffe; St Cuthbert, Birkby | | Vicar: Joanne Hustwick; OLM: Janet Sargent | 8,404 | |
| Birkby (St John the Evangelist) Huddersfield and Woodhouse | St John the Evangelist, Huddersfield | | Vicar: David Carpenter | 14,770 | |
| Birkby (St John the Evangelist) Huddersfield and Woodhouse | Christ Church, Woodhouse | | Vicar: David Carpenter | 14,770 | |
| Bradley (St Thomas) | St Thomas, Bradley | | Priest-in-Charge: Ian Jamieson | 10,692 | |
| Fixby (St Francis) and Cowcliffe, Huddersfield | St Francis, Fixby; St Hilda, Cowcliffe | | Priest-in-Charge: Ian Jamieson | 10,692 | |
| Crosland Moor (St Barnabas) and Linthwaite | St Barnabas, Crosland Moor | | Priest-in-Charge: Paul Witts; NSM: Susan Brooks | 17,335 | |
| Crosland Moor (St Barnabas) and Linthwaite | Christ Church, Linthwaite | | Priest-in-Charge: Paul Witts; NSM: Susan Brooks | 17,335 | |
| Golcar (St John the Evangelist) and Longwood | St John the Evangelist, Golcar | | Vicar: Simon Crook | 16,638 | |
| Golcar (St John the Evangelist) and Longwood | St Mark the Evangelist, Longwood | | Vicar: Simon Crook | 16,638 | |
| Huddersfield (Holy Trinity) | Holy Trinity, Huddersfield | | Vicar: Rachel Firth; Curate: Steve Harvey; NSM: Richard Swindell | 6,185 | |
| Huddersfield (St Peter) | St Peter, Huddersfield | | Vicar: Simon Moor; NSM: Carol Hawkins | 4,125 | |
| Huddersfield (St Peter) | The Net, Huddersfield | | Vicar: Simon Moor; NSM: Carol Hawkins | 4,125 | |
| Huddersfield All Saints (St Thomas) | St Thomas, Huddersfield | | Vicar: Leslie Pinfield | 5,275 | |
| Lindley (St Stephen) | St Stephen, Lindley | | Vicar: Abbie Palmer | 15,609 | |
| Marsden (St Bartholomew) and Slaithwaite with East Scammonden | St Bartholomew, Marsden | | Vacant | 9,787 | |
| Marsden (St Bartholomew) and Slaithwaite with East Scammonden | St James, Slaithwaite | | Vacant | 9,787 | |
| Marsden (St Bartholomew) and Slaithwaite with East Scammonden | Shred Mission Church | | Vacant | 9,787 | |

=== Deanery of Kirkburton ===
| Benefice | Churches | Link | Clergy | Population served | Ref |
|---|---|---|---|---|---|
| Cumberworth (St Nicholas), Denby, Denby Dale and Shepley | St Nicholas, Cumberworth | | Rector: Joyce Jones; Curate: Stephanie Hunter | 8,993 | |
| Cumberworth (St Nicholas), Denby, Denby Dale and Shepley | Holy Trinity, Denby Dale; St John the Evangelist, Denby; St Paul, Shepley | | Rector: Joyce Jones; Curate: Stephanie Hunter | 8,993 | |
| Holme Valley, the Upper, Comprising Hepworth, Holmbridge, Holmfirth, Netherthong, New Mill, Thurstonland, and Upperthong | Holy Trinity, Hepworth; St David, Holmbridge; Holy Trinity, Holmfirth; Choppards Mission Room; All Saints, Netherthong; Christ Church, New Mill; St Thomas, Thurstonland; St John the Evangelist, Upperthong | | Team Rector: Sean Robertshaw; Team Vicar: Keith Griffin; Team Vicar: Nick Heaton; Team Vicar: Diane Ellerton; NSM: Stephen Dixon; NSM: Ailsa Brooke; NSM: Evelyne Barrow; OLM: Geoffrey Bamford | 21,561 | |
| Hoyland, High (All Saints), Scissett and Clayton West | All Saints, Clayton West | | Rector: Sarah Farrimond; NSM: Katherine Currie | 4,337 | |
| Hoyland, High (All Saints), Scissett and Clayton West | St Augustine, Scissett | | Rector: Sarah Farrimond; NSM: Katherine Currie | 4,337 | |
| Kirkburton (All Hallows) and Shelley | All Hallows, Kirkburton; Emmanuel, Shelley | | Vicar: Amanda Grant; OLM: Janet Craven; OLM: Robert Chambers | 7,644 | |
| Lepton (St John the Evangelist), Emley and Flockton with Denby Grange | St John the Evangelist, Lepton | | Rector: Val Keating | 8,390 | |
| Lepton (St John the Evangelist), Emley and Flockton with Denby Grange | St Michael the Archangel, Emley | | Rector: Val Keating | 8,390 | |
| Lepton (St John the Evangelist), Emley and Flockton with Denby Grange | St James the Great, Flockton | | Rector: Val Keating | 8,390 | |
| Skelmanthorpe (St Aidan) | St Aidan, Skelmanthorpe | | Vicar: Philip Reynolds | 4,545 | |

=== Deanery of Allerton ===
| Benefice | Church | Link | Founded (building) | Clergy | Pop. served |
|---|---|---|---|---|---|
| Bardsey (All Hallows) | All Hallows, Bardsey | | Ancient | 1 | 3,628 |
| Bardsey (All Hallows) | St Mary Magdalene, East Keswick | | 1857 | 1 | 3,628 |
| Burmantofts (St Agnes) and Harehills, Leeds | St Agnes United Church, Burmantofts (CoE/Baptist) | | 1877 (1889) | 1 | 12,938 |
| Burmantofts (St Agnes) and Harehills, Leeds | SS Cyprian & James, Harehills | | 1903 (1959) | 1 | 12,938 |
| Chapel Allerton (St Matthew) | St Matthew, Chapel Allerton | | Medieval (1900) | 1 | 16,344 |
| Gipton (Church of the Epiphany) and Oakwood | The Epiphany, Gipton | | 1936 (1938) | 2 | 16,168 |
| Gipton (Church of the Epiphany) and Oakwood | Oakwood Church (CoE/Methodist) | | c. 1800 (1986) | 2 | 16,168 |
| Leeds (St Aidan) | St Aidan, Leeds | | 1894 | 2 | 14,904 |
| Leeds (St Wilfrid) | St Wilfrid, Harehills | | | 0 | 8,048 |
| Leeds City (St Peter) | Minster of St Peter, Leeds | | Ancient (1841) | 1 | 6,506 |
| Leeds Richmond Hill (St Saviour) | St Saviour, Richmond Hill | | 1845 | 0 | 4,257 |
| Moor Allerton (St John the Evangelist) (St Stephen) and Shadwell Team Ministry, Including Alwoodley and Moortown | St Barnabas, Alwoodley | | | 4 | 31,522 |
| Moor Allerton (St John the Evangelist) (St Stephen) and Shadwell Team Ministry, Including Alwoodley and Moortown | St John the Evangelist, Moor Allerton | | 1853 | 4 | 31,522 |
| Moor Allerton (St John the Evangelist) (St Stephen) and Shadwell Team Ministry, Including Alwoodley and Moortown | St Stephen, Moortown | | | 4 | 31,522 |
| Moor Allerton (St John the Evangelist) (St Stephen) and Shadwell Team Ministry, Including Alwoodley and Moortown | St Paul, Shadwell | | 1842 | 4 | 31,522 |
| Potternewton (St Martin) with Little London | St Martin, Potternewton | | 1881 | 1 | 19,476 |
| Potternewton (St Martin) with Little London | All Souls, Little London | | | 1 | 19,476 |
| Roundhay (St Edmund King and Martyr) | St Edmund King & Martyr, Roundhay | | | 2 | 13,081 |

=== Deanery of Armley ===
| Benefice | Church | Link | Founded (building) | Clergy | Pop. served |
|---|---|---|---|---|---|
| Ardsley, East (St Gabriel) (St Michael) | St Gabriel, East Ardsley | | | 1 | 6,033 |
| Ardsley, East (St Gabriel) (St Michael) | St Michael, East Ardsley | | Medieval (1881) | 1 | 6,033 |
| Ardsley, West (St Mary) | St Mary, Woodkirk | | Medieval | 1 | 12,975 |
| Armley (St Bartholomew) with New Wortley | St Bartholomew, Armley | | 1630 (1877) | 1 | 9,510 |
| Armley, Upper (Christ Church) | Christ Church, Armley | | 1872 | 2 | 7,966 |
| Beeston (St Mary the Virgin) | St Mary the Virgin, Beeston | | Medieval (1877) | 1 | 22,162 |
| Beeston (St Mary the Virgin) | The Church in Cottingley (CoE/Methodist/URC) | | 1974 (1981) | 1 | 22,162 |
| Belle Isle (St John and St Barnabas) and Hunslet | SS John & Barnabas, Belle Isle | | c. 1945 | 1 | 20,993 |
| Bramley (St Peter) | St Peter, Bramley | | | 1 | 19,573 |
| Bramley (St Peter) | St Margaret, Newlay Lane | | | 1 | 19,573 |
| Calverley (St Wilfrid) | St Wilfrid, Calverley | | Medieval | 1 | 5,074 |
| Cross Green (St Hilda) | St Hilda, Cross Green | | | 1 | 2,004 |
| Drighlington (St Paul) and Gildersome | St Paul, Drighlington | | | 1 | 11,031 |
| Drighlington (St Paul) and Gildersome | St Peter, Gildersome | | | 1 | 11,031 |
| Farsley (St John the Evangelist) | St John the Evangelist, Farsley | | | 2 | 11,140 |
| Farsley (St John the Evangelist) | The Church in Rodley (CoE/Methodist) | | | 2 | 11,140 |
| Holbeck (St Luke the Evangelist) | St Luke the Evangelist, Holbeck | | | 1 | 11,549 |
| Middleton (St Mary the Virgin) (St Cross) | St Mary the Virgin, Middleton | | 1846 | 1 | 15,623 |
| Middleton (St Mary the Virgin) (St Cross) | St Cross, Middleton | | 1933 | 1 | 15,623 |
| Morley (St Peter) | St Andrew, Morley | | | 1 | 27,991 |
| Morley (St Peter) | St Peter, Morley | | 1830 | 1 | 27,991 |
| Pudsey (St Lawrence and St Paul) | SS Lawrence & Paul, Pudsey | | pre-1800 (1824) | 1 | 17,356 |
| Stanningley (St Thomas) | St Thomas, Stanningley | | 1841 | 1 | 9,476 |
| Stanningley (St Thomas) | Christ the Saviour, Swinnow | | | 1 | 9,476 |
| Wortley (St John the Evangelist) and Farnley | St John the Evangelist, Wortley | | | 0 | 20,603 |
| Wortley (St John the Evangelist) and Farnley | SS James & Michael, Farnley | | | 0 | 20,603 |
| Wortley (St John the Evangelist) and Farnley | Moor Top Church, Farnley | | | 0 | 20,603 |
| Wyther (Venerable Bede) | Venerable Bede, Wyther | | 1938 | 1 | 8,355 |

=== Deanery of Headingley ===
| Benefice | Church | Link | Founded (building) | Clergy | Pop. served |
|---|---|---|---|---|---|
| Abbeylands Team Ministry, Comprising Hawksworth Wood with Moor Grange, Horsforth, and Kirkstall | St Mary, Hawksworth Wood | | 1922 (1935) | 2 | 25,391 |
| Abbeylands Team Ministry, Comprising Hawksworth Wood with Moor Grange, Horsforth, and Kirkstall | St Andrew, Moor Grange | | 1960s | 2 | 25,391 |
| Abbeylands Team Ministry, Comprising Hawksworth Wood with Moor Grange, Horsforth, and Kirkstall | St Margaret, Horsforth | | | 2 | 25,391 |
| Abbeylands Team Ministry, Comprising Hawksworth Wood with Moor Grange, Horsforth, and Kirkstall | St Stephen, Kirkstall | | 1829 | 2 | 25,391 |
| Adel (St John the Baptist) | St John the Baptist, Adel | | Medieval | 0 | 6,990 |
| Bramhope (St Giles) | St Giles, Bramhope | | 1881 | 1 | 3,720 |
| Burley (St Matthias) | St Matthias with Riverside, Burley | | 1854 | 2 | 6,812 |
| Cookridge (Holy Trinity) | Holy Trinity, Cookridge | | | 1 | 5,975 |
| Guiseley (St Oswald King and Martyr) with Esholt | St Oswald King & Martyr, Guiseley | | Medieval | 1 | 14,195 |
| Guiseley (St Oswald King and Martyr) with Esholt | St Paul, Esholt | | 1839 | 1 | 14,195 |
| Headingley Team Ministry (St Michael and All Angels) (St Chad) | St Michael & All Angels, Headingley | | 1627 (1886) | 1 | 24,704 |
| Headingley Team Ministry (St Michael and All Angels) (St Chad) | St Chad, Far Headingley | | 1868 | 1 | 24,704 |
| Ireland Wood (St Paul) | St Paul, Ireland Wood | | | 2 | 10,969 |
| Leeds (All Hallows) | All Hallows, Leeds | | 1876 (1970s) | 1 | 9,874 |
| Leeds St George Team Ministry | St George, Leeds | | 1837 | 3 | 9,034 |
| Leeds St George Team Ministry | St Augustine of Hippo, Wrangthorn | | 1871 | 0 | 12,359 |
| Leeds St George Team Ministry | Holy Trinity, Leeds | | 1727 | 0 | |
| Meanwood (Holy Trinity) | Holy Trinity, Meanwood | | | 0 | 10,072 |
| Otley (All Saints) | All Saints, Otley | | Ancient (Medieval) | 2 | 13,813 |
| Rawdon (St Peter) | St Peter, Rawdon | | | 1 | 6,882 |
| Woodside (St James) | St James, Woodside | | | 1 | 8,224 |
| Yeadon (St John the Evangelist) | St John the Evangelist, Yeadon | | 1844 | 1 | 11,785 |

=== Deanery of Whitkirk ===
| Benefice | Church | Link | Founded (building) | Clergy | Pop. served |
|---|---|---|---|---|---|
| Allerton Bywater (St Mary the Less), Kippax and Swillington | St Mary the Less, Allerton Bywater | | 1865 | 2 | 19,331 |
| Allerton Bywater (St Mary the Less), Kippax and Swillington | St Mary the Virgin, Kippax | | | 2 | 19,331 |
| Allerton Bywater (St Mary the Less), Kippax and Swillington | St Mary, Swillington | | | 2 | 19,331 |
| Elmete Trinity, Comprising Barwick, Scholes, and Thorner | All Saints, Barwick-in-Elmet | | Medieval | 2 | 7,575 |
| Elmete Trinity, Comprising Barwick, Scholes, and Thorner | St Philip, Scholes | | | 2 | 7,575 |
| Elmete Trinity, Comprising Barwick, Scholes, and Thorner | St Peter, Thorner | | Medieval | 2 | 7,575 |
| Garforth (St Mary the Virgin) | St Mary the Virgin, Garforth | | 1844 | 1 | 15,006 |
| Halton (St Wilfrid) and Osmondthorpe St Philip | St Wilfrid, Halton | | 1939 | 2 | 18,173 |
| Halton (St Wilfrid) and Osmondthorpe St Philip | St Philip, Osmondthorpe | | | 2 | 18,173 |
| Manston (St James) | St James the Great, Manston | | 1847 (1913) | 1 | 10,117 |
| Rothwell (Holy Trinity), Lofthouse, Methley with Mickletown and Oulton with Woodlesford Team Ministry, The | Christ Church, Lofthouse | | 1840 | 3 | 33,382 |
| Rothwell (Holy Trinity), Lofthouse, Methley with Mickletown and Oulton with Woodlesford Team Ministry, The | St Oswald, Methley | | Ancient (Medieval) | 3 | 33,382 |
| Rothwell (Holy Trinity), Lofthouse, Methley with Mickletown and Oulton with Woodlesford Team Ministry, The | St John the Evangelist, Oulton | | 1829 | 3 | 33,382 |
| Rothwell (Holy Trinity), Lofthouse, Methley with Mickletown and Oulton with Woodlesford Team Ministry, The | Holy Trinity, Rothwell | | Ancient (Medieval) | 3 | 33,382 |
| Seacroft (St James) (Church of the Ascension) (St Richard) (St Luke) (St Paul) | St James, Seacroft | | 1845 | 2 | 30,501 |
| Seacroft (St James) (Church of the Ascension) (St Richard) (St Luke) (St Paul) | St Richard, Seacroft | | | 2 | 30,501 |
| Seacroft (St James) (Church of the Ascension) (St Richard) (St Luke) (St Paul) | St Paul, Whitmoor | | | 2 | 30,501 |
| Whitkirk (St Mary) | St Mary, Whitkirk | | Medieval | 2 | 13,118 |

=== Deanery of Barnsley ===
| Benefice | Church | Link | Founded (building) | Clergy | Pop. served |
|---|---|---|---|---|---|
| Athersley (St Helen) and Carlton | St Helen, Athersley | | | 0 | 12,369 |
| Athersley (St Helen) and Carlton | St John the Evangelist, Carlton | | 1879 | 0 | 12,369 |
| Barnsley (St Peter and St John the Baptist) | SS Peter & John the Baptist, Barnsley | | | 1 | 7,460 |
| Barnsley (St George's Parish Church Centre) | St George, Barnsley | | | 3 | 26,759 |
| Barnsley, Central (St Edward the Confessor) (St Mary) (St Thomas) | St Edward the Confessor, Kingstone | | 1902 | 3 | 26,759 |
| Barnsley, Central (St Edward the Confessor) (St Mary) (St Thomas) | St Mary, Barnsley | | Ancient (1822) | 3 | 26,759 |
| Barnsley, Central (St Edward the Confessor) (St Mary) (St Thomas) | St Paul, Barnsley | | 1936 | 3 | 26,759 |
| Barnsley, Central (St Edward the Confessor) (St Mary) (St Thomas) | St Thomas, Gawber | | 1848 | 3 | 26,759 |
| Barnsley, West, Comprising Cawthorne, Dodworth, Hoylandswaine, and Silkstone | All Saints, Cawthorne | | Ancient (Medieval) | 3 | 11,661 |
| Barnsley, West, Comprising Cawthorne, Dodworth, Hoylandswaine, and Silkstone | St John the Baptist, Dodworth | | | 3 | 11,661 |
| Barnsley, West, Comprising Cawthorne, Dodworth, Hoylandswaine, and Silkstone | St John the Evangelist, Hoylandswaine | | | 3 | 11,661 |
| Barnsley, West, Comprising Cawthorne, Dodworth, Hoylandswaine, and Silkstone | All Saints, Silkstone | | Ancient (Medieval) | 3 | 11,661 |
| Cudworth (St John) | St John the Baptist, Cudworth | | | 1 | 9,454 |
| Darton (All Saints) with Staincross and Mapplewell | All Saints, Darton | | Medieval | 1 | 16,795 |
| Darton (All Saints) with Staincross and Mapplewell | St John the Evangelist, Staincross | | | 1 | 16,795 |
| Grimethorpe (St Luke) with Brierley | St Luke, Grimethorpe | | 1904 | 0 | 7,280 |
| Grimethorpe (St Luke) with Brierley | St Paul, Brierley | | 1869 | 0 | 7,280 |
| Lundwood (St Mary Magdalene) | St Mary Magdalene, Lundwood | | | 0 | 4,663 |
| Monk Bretton (St Paul) | St Paul, Monk Bretton | | 1838 (1878) | 2 | 11,151 |
| Royston (St John the Baptist) and Felkirk | St John the Baptist, Royston | | | 1 | 16,345 |
| Royston (St John the Baptist) and Felkirk | St Peter, Felkirk | | Medieval | 1 | 16,345 |

=== Deanery of Pontefract ===
| Benefice | Church | Link | Founded (building) | Clergy | Pop. served |
|---|---|---|---|---|---|
| Ackworth (All Saints) (St Cuthbert) | All Saints, Ackworth | | 1888 | 1 | 6,907 |
| Ackworth (All Saints) (St Cuthbert) | St Cuthbert, Ackworth | | Medieval | 1 | 6,907 |
| Airedale (Holy Cross) with Fryston | Holy Cross, Airedale | | 1934 | 1 | 14,703 |
| Badsworth (St Mary the Virgin) | St Mary the Virgin, Badsworth | | Medieval | 1 | 7,334 |
| Badsworth (St Mary the Virgin) | St Margaret, North Elmsall | | 1896 | 1 | 7,334 |
| Brotherton (St Edward the Confessor) | St Edward the Confessor, Brotherton | | Medieval | 1 | 6,978 |
| Ferrybridge (St Andrew) | St Andrew, Ferrybridge | | Medieval | 1 | 6,978 |
| Carleton (St Michael) and E Hardwick | St Michael, Carleton | | | 1 | 3,654 |
| Carleton (St Michael) and E Hardwick | St Stephen, East Hardwick | | 1660 (1873) | 1 | 3,654 |
| Castleford Team Parish (All Saints), Including Glasshoughton, Hightown, and Whitwood | All Saints, Castleford | | | 2 | 25,298 |
| Elmsall, South (St Mary the Virgin) | St Mary the Virgin, South Elmsall | | 1910 | 1 | 9,344 |
| Featherstone (All Saints) (St Thomas) | All Saints, Featherstone | | | 1 | 11,275 |
| Featherstone (All Saints) (St Thomas) | St Thomas, Featherstone | | 1870s | 1 | 11,275 |
| Hemsworth (St Helen) | St Helen, Hemsworth | | Ancient (Medieval) | 1 | 9,301 |
| Kinsley (Resurrection) with Wragby | Resurrection, Kinsley | | | 1 | 4,775 |
| Kinsley (Resurrection) with Wragby | St Michael & Our Lady, Wragby | | | 1 | 4,775 |
| Kirkby, South (All Saints) | All Saints, South Kirkby | | Ancient (Medieval) | 0 | 9,579 |
| Knottingley (St Botolph) and Kellington with Whitley | St Edmund, Kellington | | Medieval | 1 | 14,059 |
| Knottingley (St Botolph) and Kellington with Whitley | All Saints, Whitley Bridge | | 1861 | 1 | 14,059 |
| Knottingley (St Botolph) and Kellington with Whitley | St Botolph, Knottingley | | Medieval | 1 | 14,059 |
| Pontefract (All Saints) | All Saints, Pontefract | | Medieval (C19th) | 2 | 25,415 |
| Pontefract (St Giles) (St Mary) | St Giles, Pontefract | | Medieval | 2 | 25,415 |
| Pontefract (St Giles) (St Mary) | St Mary, Chequerfield | | | 2 | 25,415 |
| Went Valley, Comprising Darrington, Kirk Smeaton, and Wentbridge | St Luke & All Saints, Darrington | | | 1 | 2,270 |
| Went Valley, Comprising Darrington, Kirk Smeaton, and Wentbridge | St John, Wentbridge | | | 1 | 2,270 |
| Went Valley, Comprising Darrington, Kirk Smeaton, and Wentbridge | St Peter, Kirk Smeaton | | | 1 | 2,270 |
| Womersley (St Martin) | St Martin, Womersley | | Medieval | 1 | 590 |

=== Deanery of Wakefield ===
| Benefice | Church | Link | Founded (building) | Clergy | Pop. served |
|---|---|---|---|---|---|
| Altofts (St Mary Magdalene) | St Mary Magdalene, Altofts | | 1879 | 1 | 10,354 |
| Sharlston (St Luke) | St Luke the Evangelist, Sharlston | | | 1 | 10,354 |
| Alverthorpe (St Paul) | St Paul, Alverthorpe | | 1826 | 0 | 15,810 |
| Westgate Common (St Michael the Archangel) | St Michael the Archangel, Wakefield | | | 0 | 15,810 |
| Chapelthorpe (St James) | St James the Great, Chapelthorpe | | | 1 | 12,524 |
| Crofton (All Saints) | All Saints, Crofton | | Medieval | 1 | 5,724 |
| Horbury (St Peter and St Leonard) with Horbury Bridge (St John) | SS Peter & Leonard, Horbury | | Ancient (1794) | 1 | 6,997 |
| Horbury (St Peter and St Leonard) with Horbury Bridge (St John) | St John, Horbury Bridge | | C19th | 1 | 6,997 |
| Horbury Junction (St Mary) | St Mary the Virgin, Horbury Junction | | 1887 (1893) | 1 | 3,045 |
| Lupset (St George) | St George, Lupset | | 1937 | 2 | 12,819 |
| Thornes (St James) with Christ Church | St James, Thornes | | | 2 | 12,819 |
| Middlestown (St Luke) | St Luke, Middlestown | | | 1 | 5,636 |
| Middlestown (St Luke) | St Andrew, Netherton | | | 1 | 5,636 |
| Normanton (All Saints) | All Saints, Normanton | | Medieval | 1 | 15,415 |
| Ossett (Holy and Undivided Trinity) and Gawthorpe | Holy Trinity, Ossett | | Medieval (1865) | 2 | 12,737 |
| Ossett, South (Christ Church) | Christ Church, South Ossett | | | 1 | 8,472 |
| Outwood (St Mary Magdalene), Stanley and Wrenthorpe | St Mary Magdalene, Outwood | | | 2 | 24,848 |
| Outwood (St Mary Magdalene), Stanley and Wrenthorpe | St Peter's Church Centre, Stanley | | 1824 (2001) | 2 | 24,848 |
| Outwood (St Mary Magdalene), Stanley and Wrenthorpe | St Anne, Wrenthorpe | | | 2 | 24,848 |
| Ryhill (St James) | St James, Ryhill | | | 0 | 5,193 |
| Sandal Magna (St Helen) | St Helen, Sandal Magna | | Ancient (Medieval) | 1 | 13,286 |
| Sandal Magna (St Helen) | St Paul, Walton | | 1898 (1963) | 1 | 13,286 |
| Wakefield (St Andrew) St Mary (St Swithun's Centre) and Belle Vue; St Catherine | St Andrew, Wakefield | | 1846 | 3 | 14,615 |
| Wakefield (St Andrew) St Mary (St Swithun's Centre) and Belle Vue; St Catherine | St Swithun's Centre, Wakefield | | | 3 | 14,615 |
| Wakefield (St Andrew) St Mary (St Swithun's Centre) and Belle Vue; St Catherine | St Catherine, Wakefield | | | 3 | 14,615 |
| Wakefield (St John the Baptist) | St John the Baptist, Wakefield | | 1795 | 1 | 6,609 |
| Warmfield (St Peter) | St Peter the Apostle, Warmfield | | Medieval | 1 | 934 |
| Woolley (St Peter) | St Peter, Woolley | | Medieval | 1 | 1,301 |
| Woolley (St Peter) | The Church in West Bretton (CoE/Meth) | | | 1 | 1,301 |

=== Deanery of Bowland and Ewecross ===
| Benefice | Church | Link | Founded (building) | Clergy | Pop. served |
|---|---|---|---|---|---|
| Bentham (St John the Baptist), Burton-In-Lonsdale, Chapel-Le-Dale, Ingleton and Thornton-In-Lonsdale | St John the Baptist, Bentham | | Medieval | 4 | 6,175 |
| Bentham (St John the Baptist), Burton-In-Lonsdale, Chapel-Le-Dale, Ingleton and Thornton-In-Lonsdale | All Saints, Burton-in-Lonsdale | | 1876 | 4 | 6,175 |
| Bentham (St John the Baptist), Burton-In-Lonsdale, Chapel-Le-Dale, Ingleton and Thornton-In-Lonsdale | St Leonard, Chapel-le-Dale | | C17th | 4 | 6,175 |
| Bentham (St John the Baptist), Burton-In-Lonsdale, Chapel-Le-Dale, Ingleton and Thornton-In-Lonsdale | St Mary, Ingleton | | Medieval | 4 | 6,175 |
| Bentham (St John the Baptist), Burton-In-Lonsdale, Chapel-Le-Dale, Ingleton and Thornton-In-Lonsdale | St Oswald, Thornton-in-Lonsdale | | Medieval | 4 | 6,175 |
| Clapham-With-Keasden (St James) and Austwick | St James, Clapham | | Medieval | 1 | 1,326 |
| Clapham-With-Keasden (St James) and Austwick | St Matthew, Keasden | | 1873 | 1 | 1,326 |
| Clapham-With-Keasden (St James) and Austwick | Eldroth Church | | c. 1627 | 1 | 1,326 |
| Clapham-With-Keasden (St James) and Austwick | The Epiphany, Austwick | | Medieval (1839) | 1 | 1,326 |
| Gargrave (St Andrew) with Coniston Cold | St Andrew, Gargrave | | Medieval (1521) | 0 | 2,099 |
| Gargrave (St Andrew) with Coniston Cold | St Peter, Coniston Cold | | 1846 | 0 | 2,099 |
| Giggleswick (St Alkelda) and Rathmell with Wigglesworth | St Alkelda, Giggleswick | | Medieval | 1 | 5,326 |
| Giggleswick (St Alkelda) and Rathmell with Wigglesworth | Holy Trinity, Rathmell | | mid-C19th | 1 | 5,326 |
| Settle (Holy Ascension) | Holy Ascension, Settle | | 1838 | 1 | 5,326 |
| Langcliffe (St John the Evangelist) with Stainforth and Horton-In-Ribblesdale | St Oswald, Horton-in-Ribblesdale | | Medieval | 1 | 5,326 |
| Langcliffe (St John the Evangelist) with Stainforth and Horton-In-Ribblesdale | St Peter, Stainforth | | 1842 | 1 | 5,326 |
| Langcliffe (St John the Evangelist) with Stainforth and Horton-In-Ribblesdale | St John the Evangelist, Langcliffe | | 1851 | 1 | 5,326 |
| Hellifield (St Aidan) and Long Preston | St Aidan, Hellifield | | 1906 | 1 | 2,219 |
| Hellifield (St Aidan) and Long Preston | Halton West Mission Church | | | 1 | 2,219 |
| Hellifield (St Aidan) and Long Preston | St Mary the Virgin, Long Preston | | Medieval | 1 | 2,219 |
| Kirkby-In-Malhamdale (St Michael the Archangel) | St Michael the Archangel, Kirkby Malham | | Medieval | 1 | 733 |
| Slaidburn (St Andrew) with Tosside | St Andrew, Slaidburn | | Medieval | 1 | 1,129 |
| Slaidburn (St Andrew) with Tosside | St George, Dunsop Bridge | | C19th | 1 | 1,129 |
| Slaidburn (St Andrew) with Tosside | St James, Dale Head | | 1852 (1938) | 1 | 1,129 |
| Slaidburn (St Andrew) with Tosside | St Bartholomew, Tosside | | C18th | 1 | 1,129 |

=== Deanery of Harrogate ===
| Benefice | Church | Link | Founded (building) | Clergy | Pop. served |
|---|---|---|---|---|---|
| Bilton (St John the Evangelist) and St Luke | St John the Evangelist, Bilton | | 1857 | 3 | 18,154 |
| Bilton (St John the Evangelist) and St Luke | St Luke, Harrogate | | 1898 | 3 | 18,154 |
| Collingham (St Oswald) with Harewood | St Oswald, Collingham | | Ancient (Medieval) | 1 | 6,139 |
| Spofforth (All Saints) with Kirk Deighton | All Saints, Spofforth | | Medieval | 1 | 6,139 |
| Spofforth (All Saints) with Kirk Deighton | SS Joseph & James, Follifoot | | 1848 | 1 | 6,139 |
| Spofforth (All Saints) with Kirk Deighton | All Saints, Kirk Deighton | | Medieval | 1 | 6,139 |
| Spofforth (All Saints) with Kirk Deighton | St Helen, Little Ribston | | 1860 | 1 | 6,139 |
| Hampsthwaite (St Thomas À Becket) and Killinghall and Birstwith | St Thomas à Becket, Hampsthwaite | | Ancient (1820) | 1 | 3,612 |
| Hampsthwaite (St Thomas À Becket) and Killinghall and Birstwith | St Thomas the Apostle, Killinghall | | 1880 | 1 | 3,612 |
| Hampsthwaite (St Thomas À Becket) and Killinghall and Birstwith | Felliscliffe Mission Church | | 1893 | 1 | 3,612 |
| Hampsthwaite (St Thomas À Becket) and Killinghall and Birstwith | St James, Birstwith | | 1857 | 1 | 3,612 |
| Harrogate (St Mark) | St Mark, Harrogate | | 1893 (1899) | 3 | 9,354 |
| Harrogate (St Wilfrid) | St Wilfrid, Harrogate | | 1902 (1914) | 2 | 13,072 |
| Harrogate (St Wilfrid) | Kairos Church | | c. 2010 | 2 | 13,072 |
| Harrogate, High (Christ Church) | Christ Church, High Harrogate | | 1755 (1831) | 1 | 14,907 |
| Harrogate, High (St Peter) | St Peter, Harrogate | | 1870 | 3 | 3,894 |
| Knaresborough (Holy Trinity) (St John the Baptist), Goldsborough, Nidd and Brearton | St John the Baptist, Knaresborough | | Medieval | 1 | 16,607 |
| Knaresborough (Holy Trinity) (St John the Baptist), Goldsborough, Nidd and Brearton | Holy Trinity, Knaresborough | | 1856 | 1 | 16,607 |
| Knaresborough (Holy Trinity) (St John the Baptist), Goldsborough, Nidd and Brearton | St John the Baptist, Brearton | | 1836 | 1 | 16,607 |
| Knaresborough (Holy Trinity) (St John the Baptist), Goldsborough, Nidd and Brearton | St Mary, Goldsborough | | Medieval | 1 | 16,607 |
| Knaresborough (Holy Trinity) (St John the Baptist), Goldsborough, Nidd and Brearton | SS Paul & Margaret, Nidd | | Medieval (1866) | 1 | 16,607 |
| Pannal (St Robert of Knaresborough) with Beckwithshaw | St Robert of Knaresborough, Pannal | | Medieval | 2 | 7,467 |
| Pannal (St Robert of Knaresborough) with Beckwithshaw | St Michael & All Angels, Beckwithshaw | | 1886 | 2 | 7,467 |
| Starbeck (St Andrew) | St Andrew, Starbeck | | 1889 (1910) | 1 | 10,089 |
| Walkingham Hill, Comprising Arkendale, Copgrove, Farnham, Scotton, and Staveley | St Bartholomew, Arkendale | | Medieval (1837) | 1 | 1,879 |
| Walkingham Hill, Comprising Arkendale, Copgrove, Farnham, Scotton, and Staveley | St Michael & All Angels, Copgrove | | Medieval | 1 | 1,879 |
| Walkingham Hill, Comprising Arkendale, Copgrove, Farnham, Scotton, and Staveley | St Oswald, Farnham | | Medieval | 1 | 1,879 |
| Walkingham Hill, Comprising Arkendale, Copgrove, Farnham, Scotton, and Staveley | St Thomas, Scotton | | 1889 | 1 | 1,879 |
| Walkingham Hill, Comprising Arkendale, Copgrove, Farnham, Scotton, and Staveley | All Saints, Staveley | | Medieval (1864) | 1 | 1,879 |
| Washburn and Mid-Wharfe, Comprising Blubberhouses, Denton, Farnley, Fewston, Leathley, and Weston | All Saints, Farnley | | Medieval (1851) | 0 | 1,768 |
| Washburn and Mid-Wharfe, Comprising Blubberhouses, Denton, Farnley, Fewston, Leathley, and Weston | St Andrew, Blubberhouses | | 1856 | 0 | 1,768 |
| Washburn and Mid-Wharfe, Comprising Blubberhouses, Denton, Farnley, Fewston, Leathley, and Weston | SS Michael & Lawrence, Fewston | | Medieval (1697) | 0 | 1,768 |
| Washburn and Mid-Wharfe, Comprising Blubberhouses, Denton, Farnley, Fewston, Leathley, and Weston | St Oswald, Leathley | | Medieval | 0 | 1,768 |
| Washburn and Mid-Wharfe, Comprising Blubberhouses, Denton, Farnley, Fewston, Leathley, and Weston | St Helen, Denton | | Medieval (1776) | 0 | 1,768 |
| Washburn and Mid-Wharfe, Comprising Blubberhouses, Denton, Farnley, Fewston, Leathley, and Weston | All Saints, Weston | | Medieval | 0 | 1,768 |
| Wetherby (St James) | St James, Wetherby | | Medieval (1842) | 2 | 10,900 |
| Wharfedale, Lower, Comprising Kirkby Overblow with Sicklinghall, Pool and Arthington, and Weeton with North Rigton and Stainburn | All Saints, Kirkby Overblow | | Ancient (Medieval) | 0 | 5,078 |
| Wharfedale, Lower, Comprising Kirkby Overblow with Sicklinghall, Pool and Arthington, and Weeton with North Rigton and Stainburn | St Peter, Sicklinghall | | 1881 | 0 | 5,078 |
| Wharfedale, Lower, Comprising Kirkby Overblow with Sicklinghall, Pool and Arthington, and Weeton with North Rigton and Stainburn | St Wilfrid, Pool | | Medieval (1840) | 0 | 5,078 |
| Wharfedale, Lower, Comprising Kirkby Overblow with Sicklinghall, Pool and Arthington, and Weeton with North Rigton and Stainburn | St John the Evangelist, North Rigton | | C19th (1911) | 0 | 5,078 |
| Wharfedale, Lower, Comprising Kirkby Overblow with Sicklinghall, Pool and Arthington, and Weeton with North Rigton and Stainburn | St Barnabas, Weeton | | 1852 | 0 | 5,078 |

=== Deanery of Richmond ===
| Benefice | Church | Link | Founded (building) | Clergy | Pop. served |
|---|---|---|---|---|---|
| Catterick (St Anne) | St Anne, Catterick | | Ancient (Medieval) | 1 | 4,341 |
| Catterick (St Anne) | Holy Trinity, Tunstall | | 1846 | 1 | 4,341 |
| Dere Street, East, Comprising Barton, Cleasby with Stapleton, Croft, Eryholme, Manfield, and Middleton Tyas with Moulton | SS Cuthbert & Mary, Barton | | Medieval (1840) | 1 | 3,081 |
| Dere Street, East, Comprising Barton, Cleasby with Stapleton, Croft, Eryholme, Manfield, and Middleton Tyas with Moulton | St Peter, Cleasby | | pre-C19th (1828) | 1 | 3,081 |
| Dere Street, East, Comprising Barton, Cleasby with Stapleton, Croft, Eryholme, Manfield, and Middleton Tyas with Moulton | St Peter, Croft-on-Tees | | Medieval | 1 | 3,081 |
| Dere Street, East, Comprising Barton, Cleasby with Stapleton, Croft, Eryholme, Manfield, and Middleton Tyas with Moulton | St Mary, Eryholme | | Medieval | 1 | 3,081 |
| Dere Street, East, Comprising Barton, Cleasby with Stapleton, Croft, Eryholme, Manfield, and Middleton Tyas with Moulton | All Saints, Manfield | | Ancient (Medieval) | 1 | 3,081 |
| Dere Street, East, Comprising Barton, Cleasby with Stapleton, Croft, Eryholme, Manfield, and Middleton Tyas with Moulton | St Michael & All Angels, Middleton Tyas | | Medieval | 1 | 3,081 |
| Dere Street, East, Comprising Barton, Cleasby with Stapleton, Croft, Eryholme, Manfield, and Middleton Tyas with Moulton | Moulton Mission Church | | | 1 | 3,081 |
| Easby (St Agatha) with Skeeby and Brompton On Swale and Bolton On Swale | St Agatha, Easby | | Ancient (Medieval) | 1 | 3,575 |
| Easby (St Agatha) with Skeeby and Brompton On Swale and Bolton On Swale | St Agatha, Skeeby | | 1840 | 1 | 3,575 |
| Easby (St Agatha) with Skeeby and Brompton On Swale and Bolton On Swale | St Mary, Bolton-on-Swale | | Medieval | 1 | 3,575 |
| Easby (St Agatha) with Skeeby and Brompton On Swale and Bolton On Swale | St Paul, Brompton-on-Swale | | 1838 | 1 | 3,575 |
| Forcett (St Cuthbert) and Aldbrough and Melsonby | St Paul, Aldbrough St John | | 1890 | 1 | 2,017 |
| Forcett (St Cuthbert) and Aldbrough and Melsonby | Christ Church, East Layton | | 1895 | 1 | 2,017 |
| Forcett (St Cuthbert) and Aldbrough and Melsonby | St Cuthbert, Forcett | | Ancient (Medieval) | 1 | 2,017 |
| Forcett (St Cuthbert) and Aldbrough and Melsonby | St James the Great, Melsonby | | Ancient (Medieval) | 1 | 2,017 |
| Hipswell (St John the Evangelist) | St John the Evangelist, Hipswell | | Medieval (1811) | 1 | 15,042 |
| Hipswell (St John the Evangelist) | St Cuthbert, Colburn | | 1957 | 1 | 15,042 |
| Holmedale, Comprising Barningham, Gilling, Hutton Magna, Kirkby Ravensworth, and Wycliffe | St Michael & All Angels, Barningham | | Medieval (1816) | 1 | 2,238 |
| Holmedale, Comprising Barningham, Gilling, Hutton Magna, Kirkby Ravensworth, and Wycliffe | St Agatha, Gilling | | Medieval | 1 | 2,238 |
| Holmedale, Comprising Barningham, Gilling, Hutton Magna, Kirkby Ravensworth, and Wycliffe | St Mary, Hutton Magna | | Medieval (1878) | 1 | 2,238 |
| Holmedale, Comprising Barningham, Gilling, Hutton Magna, Kirkby Ravensworth, and Wycliffe | St James, Dalton | | 1897 | 1 | 2,238 |
| Holmedale, Comprising Barningham, Gilling, Hutton Magna, Kirkby Ravensworth, and Wycliffe | SS Peter & Felix, Kirkby Ravensworth | | Ancient (Medieval) | 1 | 2,238 |
| Holmedale, Comprising Barningham, Gilling, Hutton Magna, Kirkby Ravensworth, and Wycliffe | St Mary, Wycliffe | | Medieval | 1 | 2,238 |
| Richmond (St Mary with Holy Trinity) with Hudswell and Downholme and Marske | St Mary, Richmond | | Medieval | 1 | 9,118 |
| Richmond (St Mary with Holy Trinity) with Hudswell and Downholme and Marske | St Michael & All Angels, Hudswell | | Medieval (1884) | 1 | 9,118 |
| Richmond (St Mary with Holy Trinity) with Hudswell and Downholme and Marske | St Michael & All Angels, Downholme | | Medieval | 1 | 9,118 |
| Richmond (St Mary with Holy Trinity) with Hudswell and Downholme and Marske | St Edmund King & Martyr, Marske | | Medieval | 1 | 9,118 |
| Swaledale, Comprising Arkengarthdale, Grinton, Melbecks, and Muker | St Mary, Arkengarthdale | | pre-C19th (1818) | 2 | 1,803 |
| Swaledale, Comprising Arkengarthdale, Grinton, Melbecks, and Muker | St Andrew, Grinton | | Medieval | 2 | 1,803 |
| Swaledale, Comprising Arkengarthdale, Grinton, Melbecks, and Muker | Holy Trinity, Low Row | | 1840 | 2 | 1,803 |
| Swaledale, Comprising Arkengarthdale, Grinton, Melbecks, and Muker | St Mary, Muker | | Medieval (1580) | 2 | 1,803 |
| Teesdale, Lower | St Giles, Bowes | | Medieval | 1 | 3,712 |
| Teesdale, Lower | Laithkirk Parish Church | | 1577 | 1 | 3,712 |
| Teesdale, Lower | St Cuthbert, Cotherstone | | 1881 | 1 | 3,712 |
| Teesdale, Lower | St Romald, Romaldkirk | | Ancient (Medieval) | 1 | 3,712 |
| Teesdale, Lower | St Mary, Brignall | | Medieval (1834) | 1 | 3,712 |
| Teesdale, Lower | Holy Trinity, Startforth | | Medieval (1863) | 1 | 3,712 |
| Wiske Benefice, The, Comprising Birkby, Danby Wiske with Hutton Bonville, Great Smeaton with Appleton Wiske, and the Cowtons | St Peter, Birkby | | Medieval (1776) | 1 | 2,558 |
| Wiske Benefice, The, Comprising Birkby, Danby Wiske with Hutton Bonville, Great Smeaton with Appleton Wiske, and the Cowtons | St Mary, Appleton Wiske | | Medieval | 1 | 2,558 |
| Wiske Benefice, The, Comprising Birkby, Danby Wiske with Hutton Bonville, Great Smeaton with Appleton Wiske, and the Cowtons | St Eloy, Great Smeaton | | Medieval | 1 | 2,558 |
| Wiske Benefice, The, Comprising Birkby, Danby Wiske with Hutton Bonville, Great Smeaton with Appleton Wiske, and the Cowtons | Danby Wiske Parish Church | | Medieval | 1 | 2,558 |
| Wiske Benefice, The, Comprising Birkby, Danby Wiske with Hutton Bonville, Great Smeaton with Appleton Wiske, and the Cowtons | All Saints, East Cowton | | Medieval (1910) | 1 | 2,558 |

=== Deanery of Ripon ===
| Benefice | Church | Link | Founded (building) | Clergy | Pop. served |
|---|---|---|---|---|---|
| Aldborough (St Andrew) with Boroughbridge and Roecliffe | St Andrew, Aldborough | | Medieval | 0 | 3,904 |
| Aldborough (St Andrew) with Boroughbridge and Roecliffe | St James, Boroughbridge | | Medieval (1851) | 0 | 3,904 |
| Aldborough (St Andrew) with Boroughbridge and Roecliffe | St Mary, Lower Dunsforth | | Medieval (1860) | 0 | 3,904 |
| Aldborough (St Andrew) with Boroughbridge and Roecliffe | St John, Minskip | | c. 1907 | 0 | 3,904 |
| Aldborough (St Andrew) with Boroughbridge and Roecliffe | St Mary, Roecliffe | | 1843 | 0 | 3,904 |
| Bishop Thornton (St John the Evangelist), Burnt Yates, Markington, Ripley and South Stainley | St John the Evangelist, Bishop Thornton | | | 1 | 2,081 |
| Bishop Thornton (St John the Evangelist), Burnt Yates, Markington, Ripley and South Stainley | St Andrew, Burnt Yates | | 1840 | 1 | 2,081 |
| Bishop Thornton (St John the Evangelist), Burnt Yates, Markington, Ripley and South Stainley | St Michael the Archangel, Markington | | 1844 | 1 | 2,081 |
| Bishop Thornton (St John the Evangelist), Burnt Yates, Markington, Ripley and South Stainley | All Saints, Ripley | | Ancient (Medieval) | 1 | 2,081 |
| Bishop Thornton (St John the Evangelist), Burnt Yates, Markington, Ripley and South Stainley | St Wilfrid, South Stainley | | Medieval (1845) | 1 | 2,081 |
| Dacre (Holy Trinity) with Hartwith and Darley with Thornthwaite | Holy Trinity, Dacre Banks | | 1838 | 1 | 3,494 |
| Dacre (Holy Trinity) with Hartwith and Darley with Thornthwaite | Christ Church, Darley | | | 1 | 3,494 |
| Dacre (Holy Trinity) with Hartwith and Darley with Thornthwaite | St Jude, Hartwith | | 1751 | 1 | 3,494 |
| Dacre (Holy Trinity) with Hartwith and Darley with Thornthwaite | St Saviour, Thornthwaite | | Medieval | 1 | 3,494 |
| Nidderdale, Upper, Comprising Bewerley, Greenhow Hill, Middlesmoor, Pateley Bridge, Ramsgill, and Wilsill | Bewerley Grange Chapel | | 1965 (1495) | 1 | 3,432 |
| Nidderdale, Upper, Comprising Bewerley, Greenhow Hill, Middlesmoor, Pateley Bridge, Ramsgill, and Wilsill | St Mary, Greenhow Hill | | 1858 | 1 | 3,432 |
| Nidderdale, Upper, Comprising Bewerley, Greenhow Hill, Middlesmoor, Pateley Bridge, Ramsgill, and Wilsill | St Chad, Middlesmoor | | Ancient (1866) | 1 | 3,432 |
| Nidderdale, Upper, Comprising Bewerley, Greenhow Hill, Middlesmoor, Pateley Bridge, Ramsgill, and Wilsill | St Cuthbert, Pateley Bridge | | Medieval (182745) | 1 | 3,432 |
| Nidderdale, Upper, Comprising Bewerley, Greenhow Hill, Middlesmoor, Pateley Bridge, Ramsgill, and Wilsill | St Mary, Ramsgill | | 1842 | 1 | 3,432 |
| Nidderdale, Upper, Comprising Bewerley, Greenhow Hill, Middlesmoor, Pateley Bridge, Ramsgill, and Wilsill | St Michael & All Angels, Wilsill | | 1906 | 1 | 3,432 |
| Fountains Group, The, Comprising Aldfield, Dallowgill, Grewelthorpe, Kirkby Malzeard, Mickley, Sawley, and Winksley | St James, Grewelthorpe | | 1846 | 0 | 2,866 |
| Fountains Group, The, Comprising Aldfield, Dallowgill, Grewelthorpe, Kirkby Malzeard, Mickley, Sawley, and Winksley | St Andrew, Kirkby Malzeard | | Medieval | 0 | 2,866 |
| Fountains Group, The, Comprising Aldfield, Dallowgill, Grewelthorpe, Kirkby Malzeard, Mickley, Sawley, and Winksley | The Resurrection, Dallowgill | | 1956 | 0 | 2,866 |
| Fountains Group, The, Comprising Aldfield, Dallowgill, Grewelthorpe, Kirkby Malzeard, Mickley, Sawley, and Winksley | St John the Evangelist, Mickley | | 1841 | 0 | 2,866 |
| Fountains Group, The, Comprising Aldfield, Dallowgill, Grewelthorpe, Kirkby Malzeard, Mickley, Sawley, and Winksley | St Lawrence, Aldfield | | Medieval (c. 1782) | 0 | 2,866 |
| Fountains Group, The, Comprising Aldfield, Dallowgill, Grewelthorpe, Kirkby Malzeard, Mickley, Sawley, and Winksley | St Michael & All Angels, Sawley | | Medieval (1879) | 0 | 2,866 |
| Fountains Group, The, Comprising Aldfield, Dallowgill, Grewelthorpe, Kirkby Malzeard, Mickley, Sawley, and Winksley | SS Cuthbert & Oswald, Winksley | | 1917 | 0 | 2,866 |
| Kirby-on-the-Moor (All Saints), Cundall with Norton-Le-Clay and Skelton-Cum-Newby | All Saints, Kirby-on-the-Moor | | Ancient (Medieval) | 1 | 2,583 |
| Kirby-on-the-Moor (All Saints), Cundall with Norton-Le-Clay and Skelton-Cum-Newby | St Mary & All Saints, Cundall | | Medieval (1852) | 1 | 2,583 |
| Kirby-on-the-Moor (All Saints), Cundall with Norton-Le-Clay and Skelton-Cum-Newby | St Helen, Skelton-on-Ure | | early C19th | 1 | 2,583 |
| Masham (St Mary the Virgin) and Healey | St Mary the Virgin, Masham | | Ancient (Medieval) | 1 | 1,845 |
| Masham (St Mary the Virgin) and Healey | St Paul, Healey | | 1848 | 1 | 1,845 |
| Tanfield, West (St Nicholas) and Well with Snape and North Stainley | St Mary the Virgin, North Stainley | | 1840 | 0 | 1,979 |
| Tanfield, West (St Nicholas) and Well with Snape and North Stainley | St Mary's Chapel, Snape Castle | | Medieval | 0 | 1,979 |
| Tanfield, West (St Nicholas) and Well with Snape and North Stainley | St Michael the Archangel, Well | | Medieval | 0 | 1,979 |
| Tanfield, West (St Nicholas) and Well with Snape and North Stainley | St Nicholas, West Tanfield | | Medieval | 0 | 1,979 |
| Nidderdale, Lower, Comprising Hunsingore, Kirk Hammerton, and Nun Monkton | St John the Baptist, Hunsingore | | Medieval (1868) | 1 | 1,221 |
| Nidderdale, Lower, Comprising Hunsingore, Kirk Hammerton, and Nun Monkton | St John the Baptist, Kirk Hammerton | | Ancient | 1 | 1,221 |
| Nidderdale, Lower, Comprising Hunsingore, Kirk Hammerton, and Nun Monkton | St Mary, Nun Monkton | | Medieval | 1 | 1,221 |
| Ouseburn, Great (St Mary) and Little (Holy Trinity) with Marton Cum Grafton and Whixley with Green Hammerton | St Mary, Great Ouseburn | | Medieval | 1 | 3,695 |
| Ouseburn, Great (St Mary) and Little (Holy Trinity) with Marton Cum Grafton and Whixley with Green Hammerton | Holy Trinity, Little Ouseburn | | Medieval | 1 | 3,695 |
| Ouseburn, Great (St Mary) and Little (Holy Trinity) with Marton Cum Grafton and Whixley with Green Hammerton | Christ Church, Marton-cum-Grafton | | Medieval (1875) | 1 | 3,695 |
| Ouseburn, Great (St Mary) and Little (Holy Trinity) with Marton Cum Grafton and Whixley with Green Hammerton | The Ascension, Whixley | | Medieval | 1 | 3,695 |
| Ouseburn, Great (St Mary) and Little (Holy Trinity) with Marton Cum Grafton and Whixley with Green Hammerton | St Thomas, Green Hammerton | | 1876 | 1 | 3,695 |
| Ripon (Holy Trinity) | Holy Trinity, Ripon | | 1827 | 1 | 6,498 |

=== Deanery of Skipton ===
| Benefice | Church | Link | Founded (building) | Clergy | Pop. served |
|---|---|---|---|---|---|
| Barnoldswick (Holy Trinity) (St Mary Le Gill) with Bracewell | Holy Trinity, Barnoldswick | | 1842 (1960) | 2 | 11,732 |
| Barnoldswick (Holy Trinity) (St Mary Le Gill) with Bracewell | St Mary le Ghyll, Barnoldswick | | Medieval | 2 | 11,732 |
| Barnoldswick (Holy Trinity) (St Mary Le Gill) with Bracewell | St Michael, Bracewell | | Medieval | 2 | 11,732 |
| Bolton Abbey (St Mary and St Cuthbert) | Priory Church of SS Mary & Cuthbert, Bolton Abbey | | Medieval | 1 | 542 |
| Broughton (All Saints), Marton and Thornton | All Saints, Broughton | | Ancient (Medieval) | 1 | 840 |
| Broughton (All Saints), Marton and Thornton | St Peter, Marton-in-Craven | | Ancient (Medieval) | 1 | 840 |
| Broughton (All Saints), Marton and Thornton | St Mary, Thornton-in-Craven | | Medieval | 1 | 840 |
| Burnsall (St Wilfrid) with Rylstone | St Wilfrid, Burnsall | | Medieval | 1 | 3,415 |
| Burnsall (St Wilfrid) with Rylstone | St John the Baptist, Appletreewick | | c. 1897 | 1 | 3,415 |
| Burnsall (St Wilfrid) with Rylstone | St Peter, Rylstone | | Medieval (1853) | 1 | 3,415 |
| Linton in Craven (St Michael) | St Michael, Linton | | Medieval | 1 | 3,415 |
| Linton in Craven (St Michael) | St Peter, Hebden | | 1841 | 1 | 3,415 |
| Earby (All Saints) with Kelbrook | All Saints, Earby | | | 1 | 5,540 |
| Earby (All Saints) with Kelbrook | St Mary, Kelbrook | | | 1 | 5,540 |
| Embsay (St Mary the Virgin) with Eastby | St Mary the Virgin, Embsay | | 1853 | 0 | 1,891 |
| Skipton (Christ Church) with Carleton St Mary | Christ Church, Skipton | | 1837 | 2 | 11,131 |
| Skipton (Christ Church) with Carleton St Mary | St Mary the Virgin, Carleton | | | 2 | 11,131 |
| Skipton (Holy Trinity) | Holy Trinity, Skipton | | Medieval | 1 | 5,127 |
| Skipton (Holy Trinity) | St Augustine, Draughton | | | 1 | 5,127 |
| Wharfedale, Upper and Littondale, Comprising Arncliffe with Halton Gill, Hubberholme, and Kettlewell with Conistone | St Oswald, Arncliffe | | Medieval | 1 | 905 |
| Wharfedale, Upper and Littondale, Comprising Arncliffe with Halton Gill, Hubberholme, and Kettlewell with Conistone | St Mary, Kettlewell | | Medieval (1885) | 1 | 905 |
| Wharfedale, Upper and Littondale, Comprising Arncliffe with Halton Gill, Hubberholme, and Kettlewell with Conistone | St Mary, Conistone | | Medieval | 1 | 905 |
| Wharfedale, Upper and Littondale, Comprising Arncliffe with Halton Gill, Hubberholme, and Kettlewell with Conistone | St Michael & All Angels, Hubberholme | | Medieval | 1 | 905 |

=== Deanery of Wensley ===
| Benefice | Church | Link | Founded (building) | Clergy | Pop. served |
|---|---|---|---|---|---|
| Bedale (St Gregory) and Leeming and Thornton Watlass | St Gregory, Bedale | | Ancient (Medieval) | 1 | 8,788 |
| Bedale (St Gregory) and Leeming and Thornton Watlass | Burrill Mission Church | | 1856 | 1 | 8,788 |
| Bedale (St Gregory) and Leeming and Thornton Watlass | St John the Baptist, Leeming | | Medieval (1839) | 1 | 8,788 |
| Bedale (St Gregory) and Leeming and Thornton Watlass | St Mary the Virgin, Thornton Watlass | | Medieval | 1 | 8,788 |
| Kirklington (St Michael) with Burneston and Wath and Pickhill | St Lambert, Burneston | | Medieval | 1 | 2,490 |
| Kirklington (St Michael) with Burneston and Wath and Pickhill | St Michael, Kirklington | | Medieval | 1 | 2,490 |
| Kirklington (St Michael) with Burneston and Wath and Pickhill | All Saints, Pickhill | | Medieval | 1 | 2,490 |
| Kirklington (St Michael) with Burneston and Wath and Pickhill | St Mary, Wath | | Medieval | 1 | 2,490 |
| Leyburn (St Matthew) with Bellerby | St Matthew, Leyburn | | 1836 (1868) | 1 | 2,558 |
| Leyburn (St Matthew) with Bellerby | St John the Evangelist, Bellerby | | pre-C19th (1874) | 1 | 2,558 |
| Middleham (St Mary and St Alkelda) with Coverdale and East Witton and Thornton Steward | SS Mary & Alkelda, Middleham | | Medieval | 2 | 1,725 |
| Middleham (St Mary and St Alkelda) with Coverdale and East Witton and Thornton Steward | St John the Evangelist, East Witton | | 1813 | 2 | 1,725 |
| Middleham (St Mary and St Alkelda) with Coverdale and East Witton and Thornton Steward | St Botolph, Coverdale | | c. 1530 (c. 1869) | 2 | 1,725 |
| Middleham (St Mary and St Alkelda) with Coverdale and East Witton and Thornton Steward | St Oswald, Thornton Steward | | Ancient (Medieval) | 2 | 1,725 |
| Penhill, Comprising Aysgarth, Bolton Cum Redmire, Preston-Under-Scar Cum Wensley, and West Witton | St Andrew, Aysgarth | | Medieval (1866) | 0 | 2,086 |
| Penhill, Comprising Aysgarth, Bolton Cum Redmire, Preston-Under-Scar Cum Wensley, and West Witton | Thornton Rust Mission Room | | 1894 | 0 | 2,086 |
| Penhill, Comprising Aysgarth, Bolton Cum Redmire, Preston-Under-Scar Cum Wensley, and West Witton | St Oswald, Castle Bolton | | Medieval | 0 | 2,086 |
| Penhill, Comprising Aysgarth, Bolton Cum Redmire, Preston-Under-Scar Cum Wensley, and West Witton | St Mary, Redmire | | Medieval | 0 | 2,086 |
| Penhill, Comprising Aysgarth, Bolton Cum Redmire, Preston-Under-Scar Cum Wensley, and West Witton | St Margaret, Preston-under-Scar | | 1862 | 0 | 2,086 |
| Penhill, Comprising Aysgarth, Bolton Cum Redmire, Preston-Under-Scar Cum Wensley, and West Witton | St Bartholomew, West Witton | | Medieval | 0 | 2,086 |
| Swale, Lower, Comprising Ainderby Steeple with Yafforth and Kirby Wiske with Maunby, and Kirkby Fleetham with Langton On Swale and Scruton | St Helen, Ainderby Steeple | | Medieval | 0 | 2,622 |
| Swale, Lower, Comprising Ainderby Steeple with Yafforth and Kirby Wiske with Maunby, and Kirkby Fleetham with Langton On Swale and Scruton | St Michael & All Angels, Maunby | | mid C19th | 0 | 2,622 |
| Swale, Lower, Comprising Ainderby Steeple with Yafforth and Kirby Wiske with Maunby, and Kirkby Fleetham with Langton On Swale and Scruton | St John the Baptist, Kirby Wiske | | Medieval | 0 | 2,622 |
| Swale, Lower, Comprising Ainderby Steeple with Yafforth and Kirby Wiske with Maunby, and Kirkby Fleetham with Langton On Swale and Scruton | All Saints, Yafforth | | Medieval (1870) | 0 | 2,622 |
| Swale, Lower, Comprising Ainderby Steeple with Yafforth and Kirby Wiske with Maunby, and Kirkby Fleetham with Langton On Swale and Scruton | St Andrew, Great Fencote | | C19th? | 0 | 2,622 |
| Swale, Lower, Comprising Ainderby Steeple with Yafforth and Kirby Wiske with Maunby, and Kirkby Fleetham with Langton On Swale and Scruton | St Mary, Kirkby Fleetham | | Medieval | 0 | 2,622 |
| Swale, Lower, Comprising Ainderby Steeple with Yafforth and Kirby Wiske with Maunby, and Kirkby Fleetham with Langton On Swale and Scruton | St Wilfrid, Great Langton | | Medieval | 0 | 2,622 |
| Swale, Lower, Comprising Ainderby Steeple with Yafforth and Kirby Wiske with Maunby, and Kirkby Fleetham with Langton On Swale and Scruton | St Radegund, Scruton | | Medieval (1865) | 0 | 2,622 |
| Wensleydale, Lower, Comprising Crakehall, Finghall, Hauxwell, Hornby, Patrick Brompton with Hunton, and Spennithorne | St Gregory, Crakehall | | 1840 | 1 | 3,097 |
| Wensleydale, Lower, Comprising Crakehall, Finghall, Hauxwell, Hornby, Patrick Brompton with Hunton, and Spennithorne | St Andrew, Finghall | | Medieval | 1 | 3,097 |
| Wensleydale, Lower, Comprising Crakehall, Finghall, Hauxwell, Hornby, Patrick Brompton with Hunton, and Spennithorne | St Oswald, Hauxwell | | Ancient | 1 | 3,097 |
| Wensleydale, Lower, Comprising Crakehall, Finghall, Hauxwell, Hornby, Patrick Brompton with Hunton, and Spennithorne | St Mary, Hornby | | Ancient | 1 | 3,097 |
| Wensleydale, Lower, Comprising Crakehall, Finghall, Hauxwell, Hornby, Patrick Brompton with Hunton, and Spennithorne | St Patrick, Patrick Brompton | | Medieval | 1 | 3,097 |
| Wensleydale, Lower, Comprising Crakehall, Finghall, Hauxwell, Hornby, Patrick Brompton with Hunton, and Spennithorne | St Michael & All Angels, Spennithorne | | Ancient (Medieval) | 1 | 3,097 |
| Wensleydale, Upper, Comprising Askrigg, Hardraw, Hawes, and Stalling Busk | St Oswald, Askrigg | | Medieval | 1 | 2,399 |
| Wensleydale, Upper, Comprising Askrigg, Hardraw, Hawes, and Stalling Busk | SS Mary & John, Hardraw | | 1880 | 1 | 2,399 |
| Wensleydale, Upper, Comprising Askrigg, Hardraw, Hawes, and Stalling Busk | St Margaret of Antioch, Hawes | | 1480 (1851) | 1 | 2,399 |
| Wensleydale, Upper, Comprising Askrigg, Hardraw, Hawes, and Stalling Busk | St Matthew, Stalling Busk | | C17th (1909) | 1 | 2,399 |

== Dedications ==
This table is drawn from the above lists.

| Saint(s) | No. |
|---|---|
| St Mary the Virgin | 61 |
| All Saints | 41 |
| St John the Evangelist | 38 |
| St Peter | 30 |
| St James | 27 |
| Holy Trinity | 26 |
| St Paul | 23 |
| St Andrew | 21 |
| Christ Church | 21 |
| St John the Baptist | 20 |
| No dedication | 20 |
| St Michael & All Angels | 19 |
| St Thomas | 14 |
| St Oswald | 13 |
| St Michael | 11 |
| St Luke | 10 |
| St Wilfrid | 10 |
| St Bartholomew | 9 |
| St Matthew | 9 |
| St Margaret | 8 |
| St Cuthbert | 7 |
| St Helen | 7 |
| St George | 6 |
| St Mary Magdalene | 6 |
| St Saviour | 6 |
| St Stephen | 6 |
| St Barnabas | 5 |
| Saint John (unspecified) | 5 |
| St Aidan | 4 |
| All Hallows | 4 |
| St Augustine (unspecified) | 4 |
| St Chad | 4 |
| St John the Divine | 4 |
| St Mark | 4 |
| St Martin | 4 |
| St Philip | 4 |
| St Agatha | 3 |
| St Anne | 3 |
| St Edmund | 3 |
| St Giles | 3 |
| St Hilda | 3 |
| The Ascension | 2 |
| St Botolph | 2 |
| Holy Cross | 2 |
| St Edward the Confessor | 2 |
| The Epiphany | 2 |
| St Francis of Assisi | 2 |
| St Gabriel | 2 |
| St Gregory | 2 |
| Holy Innocents | 2 |
| St Leonard | 2 |
| St Nicholas | 2 |
| The Resurrection | 2 |
| St Alkelda | 1 |
| All Souls | 1 |
| St Agnes | 1 |
| St Augustine of Hippo | 1 |
| St Bede | 1 |
| St Catherine | 1 |
| Christ the King | 1 |
| Christ the Saviour | 1 |
| St Christopher | 1 |
| St Clement | 1 |
| SS Cuthbert & Mary | 1 |
| SS Cuthbert & Oswald | 1 |
| SS Cyprian & James | 1 |
| St David | 1 |
| St Eloy | 1 |
| Emmanuel | 1 |
| St Hugh | 1 |
| SS James & Michael | 1 |
| John & Barnabas | 1 |
| SS Joseph & James | 1 |
| St Jude | 1 |
| Kairos Church | 1 |
| St Lambert | 1 |
| St Lawrence | 1 |
| SS Lawrence & Paul | 1 |
| Saint Lucius | 1 |
| St Luke & All Saints | 1 |
| St Mary the Less | 1 |
| St Mary & All Saints | 1 |
| SS Mary & Alkelda | 1 |
| SS Mary & Cuthbert | 1 |
| SS Mary & Saint John | 1 |
| SS Mary & Michael | 1 |
| St Matthias | 1 |
| SS Michael & Helen | 1 |
| SS Michael & Lawrence | 1 |
| St Michael & Our Lady | 1 |
| Holy Nativity | 1 |
| The Net | 1 |
| St Patrick | 1 |
| SS Paul & Jude | 1 |
| SS Paul & Margaret | 1 |
| SS Peter & Felix | 1 |
| SS Peter & John the Baptist | 1 |
| SS Peter & Leonard | 1 |
| SS Peter & Wilfrid | 1 |
| SS Philip & James | 1 |
| St Radegund | 1 |
| St Richard | 1 |
| St Robert of Knaresborough | 1 |
| St Romald | 1 |
| St Swithun | 1 |
| St Thomas a Becket | 1 |
| Holy Trinity & St Jude | 1 |
