= Russell Harty =

English television presenter (1934–1988)

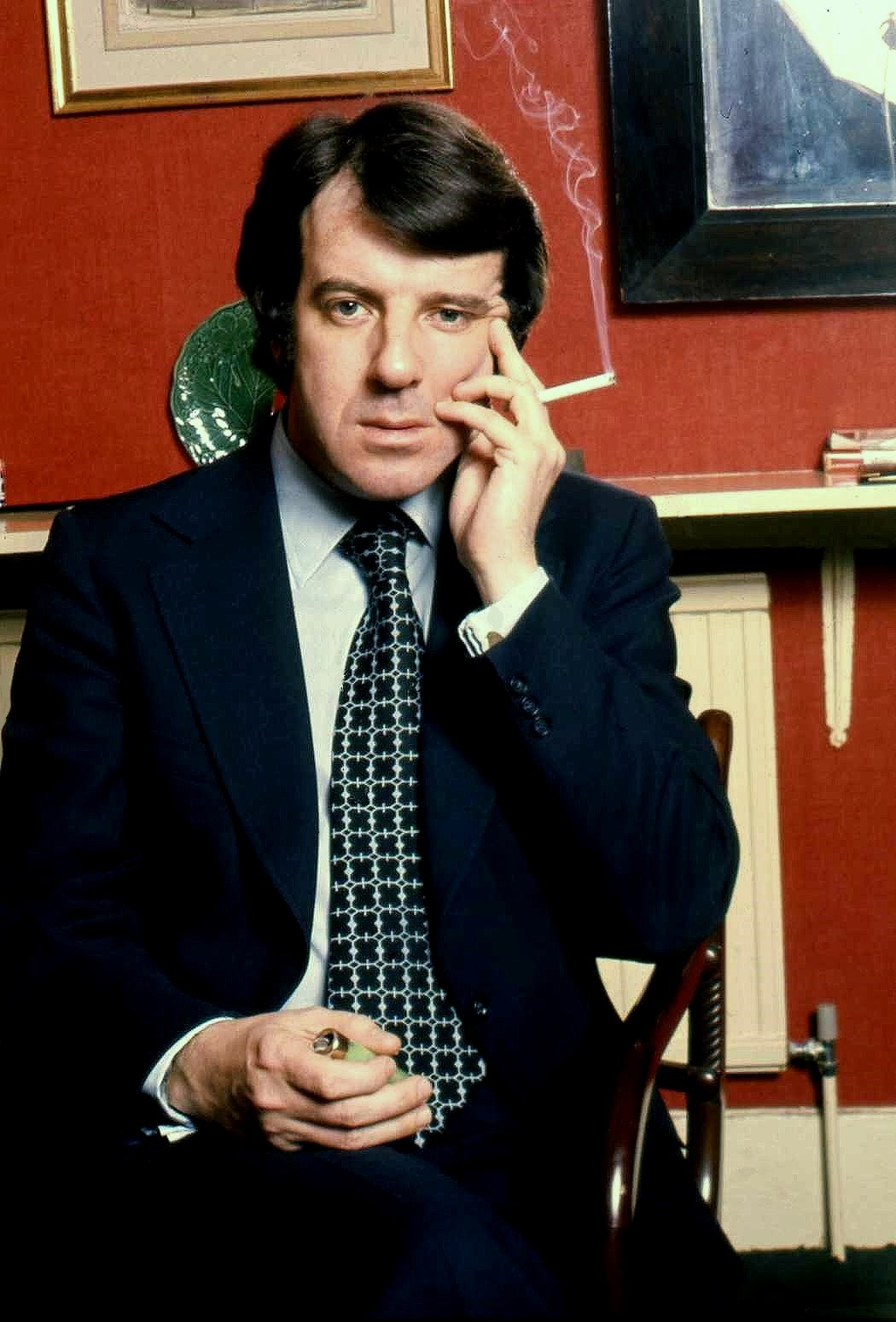
- Portrait by Allan Warren
- Born: Fredric Russell Harty; 5 September 1934; Blackburn, Lancashire, England
- Died: 8 June 1988 (aged 53); Leeds, West Yorkshire, England
- Resting place: St Alkelda Church, Giggleswick, North Yorkshire, England
- Occupation: Talk show host
- Years active: 1967–1988

Fredric Russell Harty (5 September 1934 – 8 June 1988) (Note: The Encyclopædia Britannica spells his first given name "Frederic".) was an English television presenter of arts programmes and chat show host.

== Early life ==
Harty was born in Blackburn, Lancashire, the son of greengrocer Fred Harty, who ran a fruit-and-vegetable stall on the local market, and his wife Myrtle Rishton. He attended Queen Elizabeth's Grammar School in Blackburn. There he was taught English by Oxford graduate Ronald Eyre (later a professional theatre director and broadcaster) who directed him in a school production of The Tempest; Harty thought Eyre an inspirational teacher and they became friends. Thereafter he studied at Exeter College, Oxford, where he obtained a degree in English literature.

== Teaching career ==
On leaving university, Harty taught briefly at Blakey Moor Secondary Modern School in Blackburn, then became an English teacher and directed school plays at Giggleswick School in North Yorkshire. His friend and Oxford contemporary Alan Bennett commented in his 2016 memoir Keeping On Keeping On, "I got a first-class degree and was a hopeless teacher. Russell Harty had a third-class degree and taught brilliantly... he knew how to enthuse a class and made learning fun, much as he could work a studio audience." (Note: Bennett said more formally, in his Oxford Dictionary of National Biography entry on Harty, that he was awarded a third in 1957. Harty's Screenonline entry states that he took a first. Harty himself wrote, in a Sunday Times profile of Bennett, that when they went on holiday after graduation in 1957, "He had newly been crowned with a first-class degree... I, on the other hand, had been grudgingly awarded a lesser". The Final Honours Schools class lists published in The Times in August 1957 indicate that Bennett was correct, and Harty did indeed receive a third.)

Among Harty's pupils at the Giggleswick School were the journalist and television presenter Richard Whiteley and the actors Graham Hamilton and Anthony Daniels. In the mid-1960s Harty spent a year lecturing in English literature at the City University of New York.

== Broadcasting career ==
He began his broadcasting career in 1967 when he became a radio producer for the BBC Third Programme, reviewing arts and literature.

In 1969 he moved into television, first as a researcher, then as producer and presenter on the arts programme Aquarius, London Weekend Television's rival to the BBC's Omnibus. One programme involving a "meeting of cultures" saw Harty travelling to Italy in 1974 to engineer an encounter between the entertainer Gracie Fields and the composer William Walton, two fellow Lancastrians then living on the neighbouring islands of Capri and Ischia. A documentary on Salvador Dalí ("Hello Dalí"), directed by Bruce Gowers, won an Emmy. Another award-winning documentary was "Finnan Games" (1975) about a Scottish community, Glenfinnan, where "Bonnie Prince Charlie" raised his standard to begin the Jacobite rising of 1745, and its Highland Games.

After establishing himself on Aquarius, Harty persuaded LWT to let him present a chat show, Eleven Plus. In 1972, he interviewed Marc Bolan, who at that time was at the height of his fame as a teen idol and king of glam rock. During the interview, Harty asked Bolan what he thought he would be doing when he was forty or sixty years old; Bolan replied that he didn't think he would live that long. (Bolan subsequently was killed in a car crash at age 29 on 16 September 1977).

Also in 1972, LWT gave him his own series, Russell Harty Plus (later simply titled Russell Harty), conducting celebrity interviews, which placed him against the BBC's Parkinson. Parts of Harty's interview with the Who in 1973 were included in Jeff Stein's 1979 film The Kids Are Alright, providing notable moments, such as Pete Townshend and Keith Moon ripping off each other's shirt sleeves. In 1973 and in 1975 he interviewed David Bowie. In 1975, he also interviewed Alice Cooper, who called the experience "the best TV show I ever did". Other high-profile show business figures interviewed by Harty included Danny Kaye, Rudolf Nureyev, Rita Hayworth, Diana Dors, Elaine Stritch, Ralph Richardson and Oliver Reed. In 1973 Harty won a Pye Television Award for being male personality of the year.

He remained with ITV until 1980, at which point he transferred to the BBC. (Note: This meant a boost to his profile and potential viewers, since LWT shows were technically regional and not nationwide programming; in 1973 Russell Harty Plus could not be seen in his native Lancashire.) His first show was an arts programme, All About Books, but after a pause his chat-show activities resumed. In November 1980 he interviewed the model and singer Grace Jones. Jones has said she was sleep-deprived and had taken "bad coke" before the interview, at one point hallucinating that Harty was her abusive step-grandfather. She has also said she found him condescending. Joined later on stage by other guests including Walter Poucher and Patrick Lichfield, Harty was compelled by the set's seating arrangement to turn his back on Jones for an extended period. After several protests, she slapped him repeatedly. The incident generated so much press coverage that Harty later joked the headline for his obituary would read "Grace Jones Man Dead".

Initially shown on BBC2 in a mid-evening slot, Russell Harty ran until May 1983 before being moved to an early evening BBC1 slot in September of that year; it was now simply titled Harty. The show ended in December 1984, though Harty would continue to present factual programmes for the BBC for some time afterwards. In 1985, Harty was invited to the Prince's Palace of Monaco, by Prince Rainier, to conduct his first interview since the death of his wife, the actress Grace Kelly, in 1982.

He was the subject of This Is Your Life in 1980, when he was surprised by Eamonn Andrews at the London department store Selfridges while dressed as Santa Claus giving out presents to children.

In 1986, he interviewed Dirk Bogarde at his house in France, for Yorkshire Television. Some journalists thought the programme intrusive; some have cited Harty's achievement in getting the famously reclusive Bogarde to open up as a highpoint in his career as an interviewer.

In 1979, before his full-time return to the BBC, Harty had taken over from Desmond Wilcox as host of BBC Radio 4's Midweek; from September 1987 until his final illness, he presented Start the Week on the same station. Also in 1987, he took over the TV programme Favourite Things from Roy Plomley; one of his interviewees was Margaret Thatcher. His last show, Russell Harty's Grand Tour, was broadcast by BBC-TV in 1988.

== Writing ==
After writing occasional pieces for The Guardian, Harty wrote a weekly column for The Observer from 1977 to 1981, then from 1986 one for The Sunday Times. In 1980 his adaptation of a short story by Muriel Spark, Black Madonna, was broadcast as part of the series BBC2 Playhouse.

== Personal life ==
For the last six years of Harty's life his partner was the Irish novelist Jamie O'Neill. Latterly they resided in Harty's cottage in Giggleswick, North Yorkshire.

On 1 March 1987, The News of the World ran an article exposing Harty as homosexual and claiming he used rent boys; the paper sent a male prostitute with a hidden tape recorder to his flat. In the hope of further revelations, reporters converged on Giggleswick, sat on Harty's doorstep, went through his dustbins, chased his car, forced their way into the school where he had once been a teacher, and even attempted to bribe the local vicar. Harty's career and his popularity were not immediately affected by the coverage, and he continued writing for The Sunday Times (a sister paper to The News of the World). Nonetheless, the incident was controversial, and was one of several instances cited in the debate about journalistic ethics in Britain that led to the Calcutt committee.

Harty was a friend of the playwright Alan Bennett, whose first cabaret performance (while they were students at Oxford) was at a show Harty put together. Bennett spoke of Harty's friendship with Bennett's own family, in the essay "Written on the Body" taken from his autobiographical collection Untold Stories:

Russell's shock-horror exposure in the tabloids, and the so-called revelations about his sex life, come long after my father is dead and my mother is incapable, but if they'd been around they might well have just shrugged it off. Dad certainly wouldn't have wanted him to stop coming round, as it would put an end to him playing his violin with Russell on the piano.

== Death ==
In April 1988, Harty became ill with hepatitis B. He collapsed and was admitted to the intensive care unit at St James's University Hospital, Leeds. Scrutiny from tabloid newspapers continued while Harty was seriously ill: they claimed that the disease was "related to an HIV/AIDS" infection, something his family and the hospital authorities denied to the press. (Note: The Times reported, "Professor Monty Losowsky, head of the hospital's department of medicine, said Mr Harty had probably contracted the virus while travelling abroad. Hepatitis could be transmitted when the skin was punctured by a mosquito or bed bug bite. Professor Losowsky said that most people treated at St James's for the virus had recently been abroad. Mr Harty has recently completed a television series, Russell Harty's Grand Tour, in which he travelled widely throughout Europe." The Sun reported that he had not AIDS but hepatitis, before adding "which is passed in the same way. Harty is a bachelor".) Journalists took a high-rise flat opposite the hospital and used a long-lens camera to photograph him on his deathbed, so that nursing staff had to keep the shutters closed; they sent a large bouquet of "Get Well Soon" flowers to another patient in the ICU, containing money and the number of a newsdesk in Manchester (though the patient was too frail to be able to read this), and tried to bribe porters and nurses in the hope of a scoop. One journalist put on a white coat and managed to gain access to the ICU, pretending to be a junior doctor, so he could read Harty's medical notes.

He died in St James's on 8 June 1988 at the age of 53 from liver failure caused by hepatitis. His body was buried in the graveyard of St Alkelda Church at Giggleswick. At a memorial service at St James's Church, Piccadilly attended by Harty's friends and colleagues from showbusiness, Alan Bennett commented in his eulogy that "the gutter press had finished Harty off." (Note: Bennett claimed that the hostile media coverage had frightened Harty into an unhealthy amount of overwork, broadcasting multiple programmes on TV and radio while continuing his journalism and also writing a book: "He expected the BBC not to renew his contract and that offers of work elsewhere would be bound to dwindle. In fact this did not happen, and he began to work harder than he had ever worked before. So convinced was he that there would soon be no more, he accepted every offer that came his way... On the surface it seemed things had never been better. But his first instinct had been right. The gutter press had finished him because they had panicked him into working so hard that by the time he was stricken with hepatitis he was an exhausted man." The News of the World replied the following Sunday, "we'd like to teach Mr Bennett a lesson in medicine: nobody ever caught Hepatitis B from a newspaper". Its "sister paper"The Sun responded similarly, "he died from a sexually related disease. The press didn't give it to him." A posthumous Sunday Times tribute also commented on Harty's outburst of work at the end of his life: after "he weathered a momentary tabloid scandal... he seemed to become ubiquitous". A Daily Mail article quoted Jamie O'Neill as taking slight issue with Bennett's version of events, suggesting that Harty was only motivated by a need to make as much money as he could before retirement, although O'Neill did recall Harty saying when the first tabloid articles about him appeared, "I'm finished".) Another memorial service, for family members and local friends, took place at Blackburn Cathedral where Harty had once been a server. His friend Michael Parkinson delivered the address, and told the media, "Russell was a very funny man and a damn sight nicer than anyone who wrote about him".

== Bibliography ==
- Bennett, Alan (1997). Writing Home (rev. ed.). London: Faber & Faber. ISBN 0-571-19667-5.
- Games, Alexander (2001). Backing into the Limelight: The Biography of Alan Bennett. London: Headline. ISBN 0-7472-7030-9.
