= Alkelda =

Anglo-Saxon princess, died c. 800

Saint Alkelda
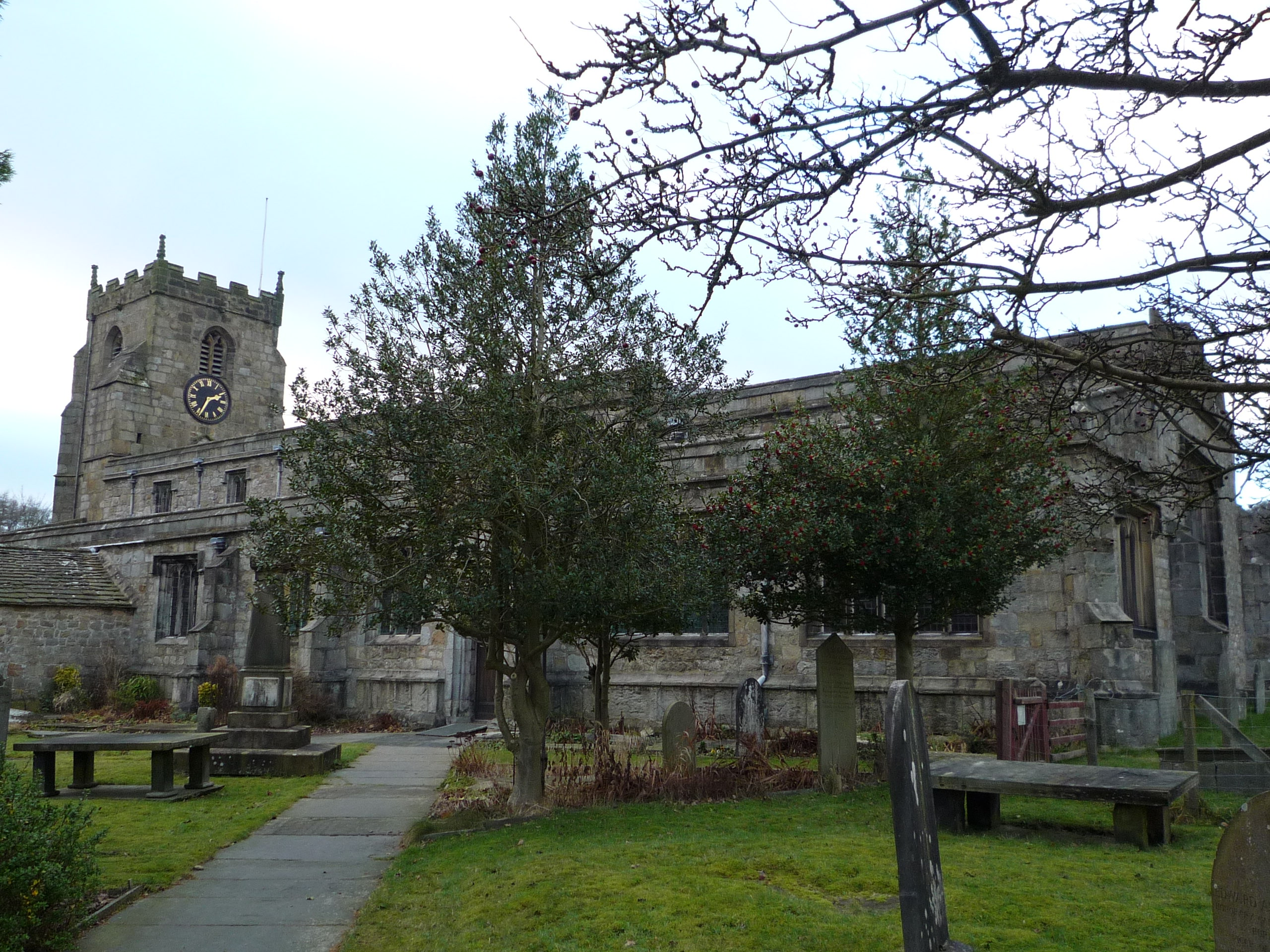
- St Alkelda's Church, Giggleswick
- Died: c. 800; Middleham, North Yorkshire
- Feast: 28 March

Saint Alkelda (Old English: Hǣlcelde, "healing spring"; died on 28 March c. 800), also spelt Alcelda or Alchhild, was ostensibly an Anglo-Saxon princess of whom almost nothing is known and whose existence has been questioned.

== Alternative origins ==
Legend has it that she was an Anglo-Saxon princess, and probably also a nun, who was strangled by pagan Viking women during Danish raids in about 800 at Middleham in Yorkshire. She is patron of the church at Giggleswick and also of that of Middleham, the church there having a holy well, but of no others. She may have been in addition abbess of a monastery at Middleham. In 1389, the Lord of Middleham Manor received a crown grant to hold a weekly market and yearly fair on the feast of St Alkelda.

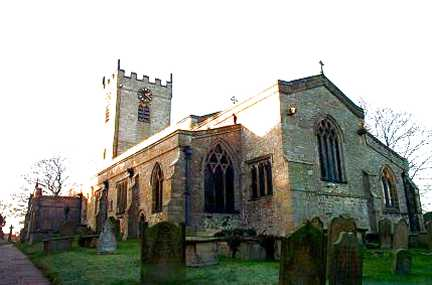
Church of Saints Mary and Alkelda, Middleham

The area is known for its many springs, some very near the sites of these churches. With no documentary reference to this saint until the late Middle Ages, it has been surmised that the name Alkelda is a corruption of an Anglo-Saxon word, haligkelda, meaning holy spring. However, this has been contested, also with claims that she may actually have been Icelandic, from Ölkelda, and her reputation brought to Yorkshire in Northern England by Vikings, where she became associated with holy springs such as Giggleswick.

Her feast day is 28 March.

== St Alkelda’s Way ==
St Alkelda’s Way is a self-guided pilgrimage walk of 33 miles that runs from Giggleswick to Middleham through the Yorkshire Dales National Park, and pass the remains of Coverham Abbey.
