= Giggleswick =

Village in North Yorkshire, England

Coordinates: 54°04′19″N 2°17′19″W

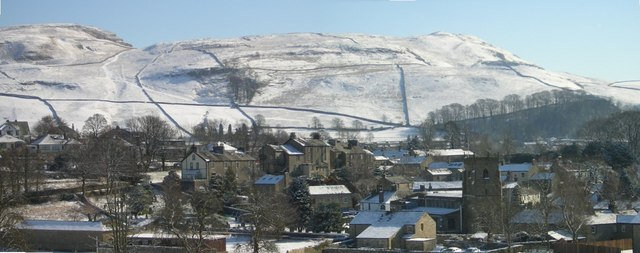
- Giggleswick in snow

- Location within North Yorkshire
- Population: 1,270 (2011 census)
- OS grid reference: SD809647
  - London: 205 mi (330 km) south-east
- Unitary authority: North Yorkshire
- Ceremonial county: North Yorkshire
- Region: Yorkshire and the Humber
- Country: England
- Sovereign state: United Kingdom
- Post town: Settle
- Postcode district: BD24
- Dialling code: 01729
- Police: North Yorkshire
- Fire: North Yorkshire
- Ambulance: Yorkshire
- UK Parliament: Skipton and Ripon

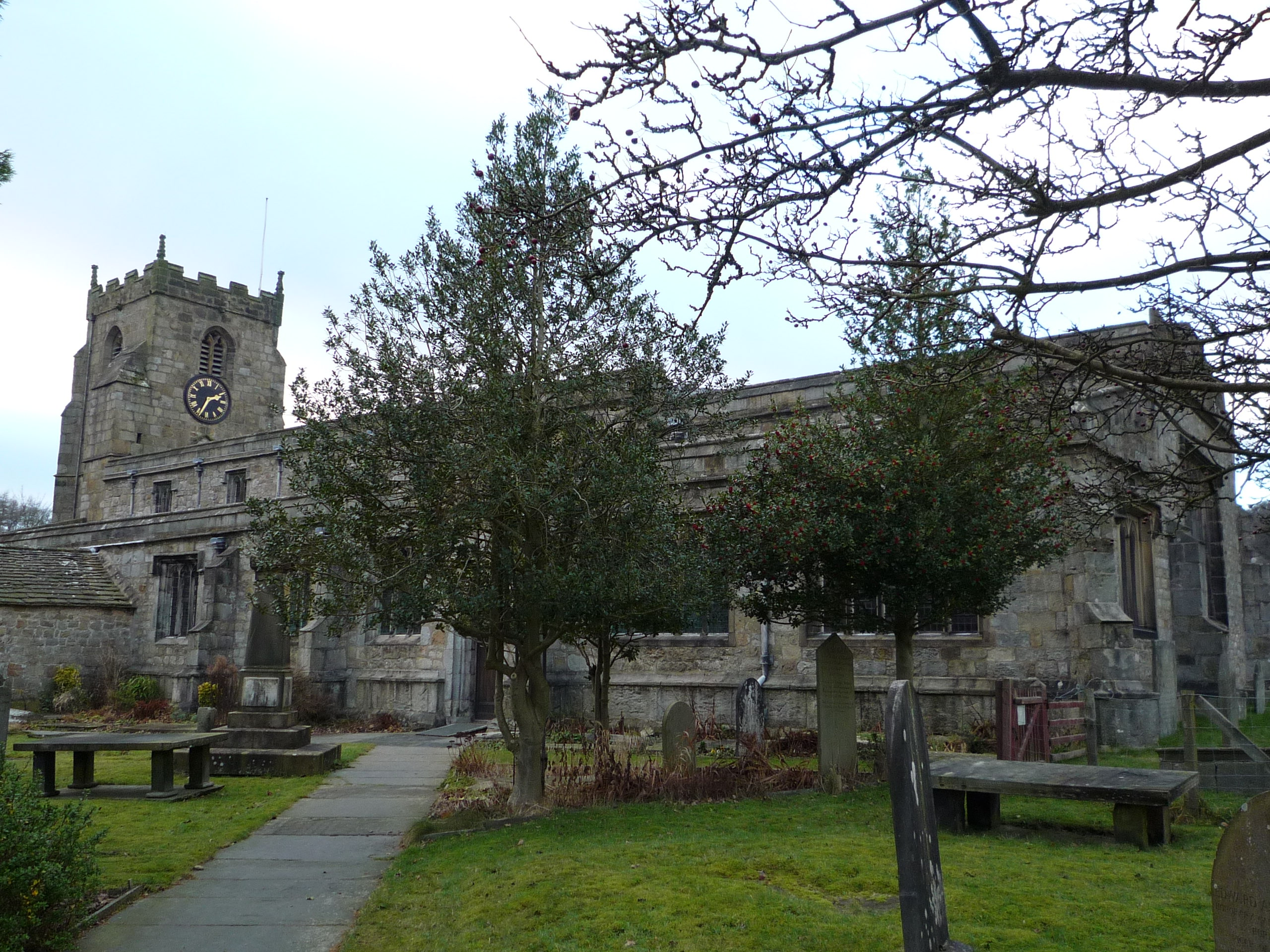
The church of St Alkelda

Giggleswick, a village and civil parish in North Yorkshire, England, lies on the B6480 road, less than 1 mile (1.6 km) north-west of the town of Settle and divided from it by the River Ribble. It is the site of Giggleswick School.

Until 1974 it was part of the West Riding of Yorkshire. From 1974 to 2023 it was part of the Craven District, it is now administered by the unitary North Yorkshire Council.

== Toponymy ==
A Dictionary of British Place Names (2011) contains the entry:

Giggleswick N. Yorks. Ghigeleswic 1086 (DB). "Dwelling or (dairy) farm of a man called Gikel or Gichel. OE or ME pers. name (probably a short form of the biblical [sic] name Judichael) + wīc."

== Railway station ==
The village is served by Giggleswick railway station, which provides services to Leeds and to Lancaster and Morecambe. There are five trains a day in each direction, operated by Northern.

Close to the station and opposite the Craven Arms Hotel (formerly the Old Station Inn) is the Plague Stone. This has a shallow trough, which in times of plague was filled with vinegar to sterilize the coins that were left by townspeople as payment for food brought from surrounding farms. The stone was moved a short distance from its original site when the Settle bypass was built.

== Church of St Alkelda ==
The parish church is dedicated to St Alkelda, an obscure Anglo-Saxon saint associated with the North Yorkshire town of Middleham. The building dates mostly from the 15th century, but carved stones discovered during the restoration of 1890–1892 showed that a building existed on the site before the Norman Conquest. It has been classed by English Heritage as a Grade I listed building. The restoration, carried out by the Lancaster architects Paley, Austin and Paley, included replacing the roof, removing the gallery, rebuilding the vestry, and reseating, replastering and reflooring the church.

== Notable people ==
- Richard Whiteley of Channel 4's Countdown was a pupil at Giggleswick School. In his will he left the school £500,000, which was used to build a new theatre named after him.
- Russell Harty was an English teacher at the same time as Whiteley was a pupil.
- The operatic soprano Sarah Fox was born in the village and attended Giggleswick School.
- The Star Wars actor Anthony Daniels also attended Giggleswick School.
- The film and stage actor Clarence Blakiston (1864–1943) was born in Giggleswick, as was Henry Maudsley, the pioneering British psychiatrist, at a farm outside Giggleswick in 1835.
- The Victorian-era actor Sir John Hare was born in the town in 1844.
- Professor Sir Nevill Francis Mott, who won the Nobel Prize in Physics in 1977, was born in Leeds and brought up in Giggleswick.
- Television chef Susan Brookes is a former resident of the village, having resided there in the 1980s.

== Tourist attractions ==
Giggleswick is notable amongst rock climbers for a limestone crag, retro-bolted with many sports routes during 2005 and 2006. The crag is opposite Settle Golf Club on the B6480, north of Giggleswick.

Cave Ha, hollowed out of the massive cliff of Great Scar limestone, is a large rock shelter. Together with Sewell's Cave, it has produced a large amount of archaeological material, including bones which are 5,600 years old.

== In the media ==
An episode of the radio comedy The Shuttleworths was set in Giggleswick. Comedy writers Ray Galton and Alan Simpson used the town as their emblem of a travelling actor's date with obscurity in Hancock's Half Hour, "The Train Journey" episode, broadcast on 23 October 1959. Les Dawson did the same in 1975, in Dawson's Weekly. In 1989, the TV series Capstick's Law, focusing on a family law firm in the 1950s, used Russell Harty's old cottage as a venue. The TV series 24seven was filmed at Giggleswick School.

== 1927 eclipse ==
Among few observers of a 24-second solar eclipse in 1927 were members of the Astronomer Royal's expedition to Giggleswick.

== See also ==
- Listed buildings in Giggleswick
- Castleberg Hospital
