= Church of St Alkelda, Giggleswick =

Anglican church in North Yorkshire, England

St Alkelda's Church
- Church of St Alkelda, Giggleswick
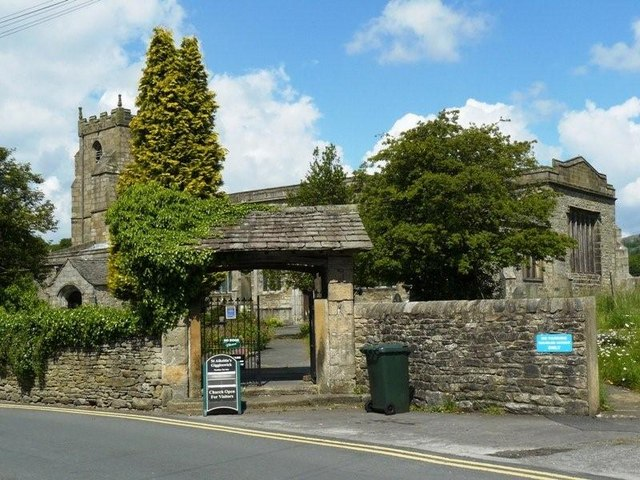
- St Alkelda's Church
- 54.072°N 2.289°W
- OS grid reference: SD 81151 64084
- Location: Giggleswick, North Yorkshire
- Country: England
- Denomination: Church of England
- Website: Official webpage

History
- Status: Parish church
- Dedication: Alkelda (Note: Some sources have St Alkald as the historical dedication. Alkelda is disputed as a Saxon name through its etymology, as female names did not end with an a.)

Architecture
- Functional status: Active
- Architectural type: Early English; Perpendicular

Specifications
- Length: 132 feet (40 m)

Administration
- Diocese: Leeds
- Archdeaconry: Richmond and Craven
- Deanery: Bowland and Ewecross
- Benefice: Castleberg
- Parish: Giggleswick

Clergy
- Vicar: Reverend Julie Clarkson

Listed Building – Grade I
- Designated: 20 February 1958
- Reference no.: 1157303

The Church of St Alkelda, Giggleswick (historically St Alkald), is an Anglican church in the village of Giggleswick, North Yorkshire, England. St Alkelda's was the mother church for the extended parish of Giggleswick, until the church in Settle, North Yorkshire was built in 1838, and later became a separate parish.

The dedication of the church is to a little-known Saxon princess (Alkelda) with connections to a religious site in Middleham, North Yorkshire, with much speculation as to how the dedication arrived at the church in Giggleswick. The church is still in use as a place of worship.

== History ==
A church is believed to have existed on the site of St Alkelda's since Saxon times, however, the church that stands today is largely from the 14th and 15th centuries, with alterations and renovations in the late 19th and early 21st centuries. A previous church is believed to have been destroyed by marauding scots c. 1319. The first documented reference to a church in Giggleswick was in 1160, when "Laurentius, persona de Guckilswic", mentioned the site in a letter written to William de Percy. The church is one of only two that are dedicated to St Alkelda in England, the other, is in Middleham, also in North Yorkshire. Alkelda was a Saxon princess who was said to have been strangled by two Danish women during the Viking invasions. The name Alkelda, is said to derive from either Alchhild or Halig Keld, the latter name has been associated with holy springs. Such a spring existed in Giggleswick, being the source of the now drained Giggleswick Tarn. (Note: Giggleswick Tarn was supposedly fed by the holy spring, and was large enough to support the needs of a community. In 1863, a 8 feet 2 inches (2.5 m) longboat was discovered on what was believed to be the site of the tarn. The boat was used for fishing.) It is possible that the name Alkelda stems from this spring.

Another possibility is that the church had an early association with the church of the same name at Middleham. Alkelda is believed to have been buried at Middleham, and that the church at Giggleswick became a daughter house of worship to the church there, after the Northumbrian kings took over lands in the Craven area c. 670. (Note: Edwards suggests that the absence of the name Achhild, Alkelda or other variations from the Liber Vitae Dunelmensis, is evidence that Middleham and Giggleswick did not have close links with Lindisfarne.)

Records show that the church at Giggleswick was given by Henry de Puteaco in 1200, to the monks at Finchale, near Durham. It was still in the possession of Finchale thirty years before the Dissolution of the Monasteries, where a document indicates that the church belonged to the "prior and convent of Durham".

In 1507, a record indicates the granting of half an acre of land to build "a gramar scole[sic] for boys". Staff and pupils from the adjacent Giggleswick School attended services at the church, even paying for gas to be installed for later afternoon services when their numbers threatened to overwhelm the local population. The renovation of 1880 was paid for with money raised from the current and former pupils at the school. This continued until 1901, when the school opened up its own chapel.

Architecturally, the style of the church ranges between Early English and Perpendicular, being described as "..a spacious and handsome structure in the later English style, with a square embattled tower." Most of the glass in the church dates from the 15th century when it was renovated, but a newer piece was installed in the 2010s. Whilst looking through the parish room, two churchwardens discovered a stained glass window depicting St Alkelda being strangled by a sash held by two priestly hands, whilst she was suspended over water. This was later dated to between 1920 and 1930, but no other provenance came to light. The window was later installed in the church.

The organ, built by Abbott and Smith, was installed in 1892 and extensively renovated in 2005 by a company based in York.

The church is linked to the only other Anglican Church dedicated to St Alkelda in Yorkshire, the Church of St Mary and St Alkelda, Middleham, via the 33-mile (53 km) St Alkelda's Way.

In 2020, the church gained permission to install solar panels on its roof to help it save energy and reduce its carbon footprint. No objections were raised by official bodies such as Historic England, as the panels are on a roof that cannot be viewed from ground level.

=== Churchyard ===
St Alkelda's was the only official burial place for the parish until the early 19th century. Various estimates have concluded that thousands may have been buried there over the intermediate centuries. The TV chat-show host, Russell Harty, was buried in the churchyard in 1988.

== Parish and benefice ==
The first reference to clergy is as far back as 1160, when the parish was in the Diocese of York. In 1836, the parish was transferred into the Diocese of Ripon, before moved again into the Diocese of Bradford, in 1919. In 2014, it was moved into the newer Diocese of West Yorkshire and the Dales. This, in turn, became the Diocese of Leeds in April 2016.

Despite Settle being the main market town in the area, St Alkelda's was always the mother church, until the Church of Holy Ascension was built in Settle in 1838. The ancient parish that St Alkelda's was responsible for, consisted of over 18,500 acres (7,500 ha) and included; Giggleswick, Langcliffe, Rathmell with Wigglesworth, Settle, and Stainforth. Giggleswick was the ecclesiastical parish town until 1851, when Langcliffe was created as its own parish, with the same happening to Settle in 1898.

St Alkelda's now serves the smaller ecclesiastical Parish of Giggleswick (parish code 460172), and had a weekly attendance of 40 in 2018.

== Clergy ==
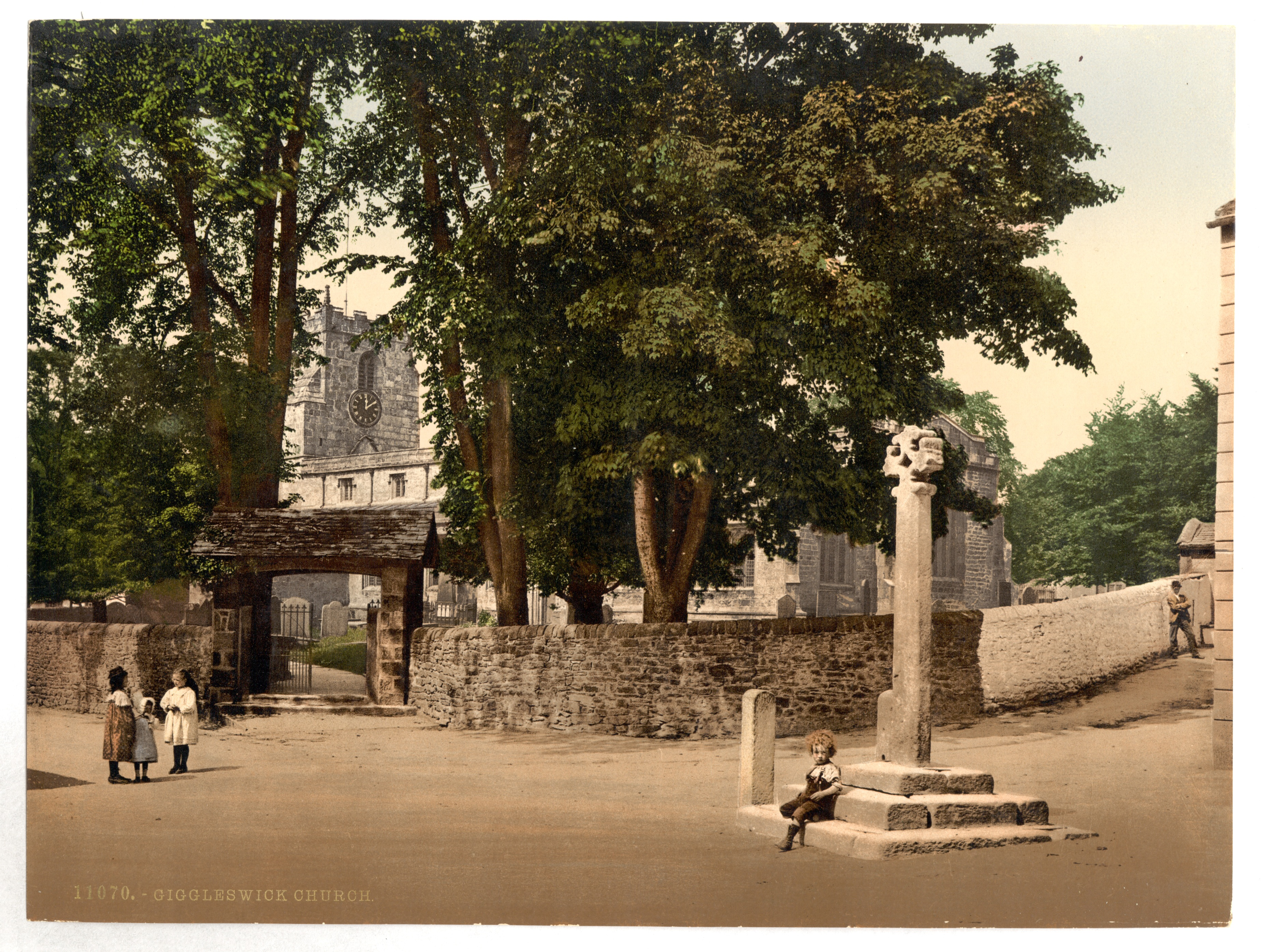
Giggleswick Church, Yorkshire, England (c. 1905)

Records are from Genuki and Whitaker's The history and antiquities of the deanery of Craven, in the county of York.

Vicars of St Alkelda's, Giggleswick
Year	Incumbent	Year	Incumbent	Year	Incumbent	Year	Incumbent
1230	Walter de Vestario	1441	William Loveday	1631	John Watson	1900	Theodore P Brocklehurst
1276	John	1447	Richard Fulthorpe‡	1632	Robert Dockray	1933	Guy Walmisley-Dresser
1279	Adam	1485	Hugo Wren‡	1638	Anthony Lister†	1936	John G Foster
1316	William de Alverton‡	1493	Christopher Tennant†	1686	Richard Ellershaw	1939	Henry M Foyl
1330	Henry de Lotyngton‡	1496	Hugo Wren†	1720	Josias Dawson	1955	Edward A J Miller
1335	William de Preston	1507	James Carr	1730	John Claphamson	1973	Martin P Brion
1339	William Stalmyn†	1509	Alan Percy‡ (Note: Resigned to take up the post of Master of St John's College, Cambridge.)	1738	Christopher Swainson	1980	James H Richardson
1413	John Holderness♦‡	1517	Robert Newton	1741	Anthony Lister	1985	G David Rhodes
1414	William Catton†	1546	James Procter‡	1756	John Thompson	2000–2012	Peter Yorkstone
1425	John Berkheved†	1548	John Nowell	1782	John Clapham‡	*2004	Susan Bentley (Note: Bentley was the pastor at St James' Episcopal Church in Roanake County, Virginia, US. She and Yorkstone had an exchange of ministries after the two parishes were linked together by the Diocese of Bradford and the Diocese of South West Virginia in the 1980s.)
1428	John Wodhus†	1556	Thomas Abbott†	1839	Rowland Ingram	2012	Hilary Young
1438	William de Hackforth‡	1576	Christopher Shute†	1853	William H Coulthurst	2019	Julie Clarkson
1440	Christopher Altham	1626	John Brooke	1893	Addison Crofton		

- †Died in office
- ‡Resigned office
- ♦Interregnum between incumbent and previous when dates are incorrect, period appears too long or records are incomplete.
