= Ölkelda =

Coordinates: 64°53′0″N 23°42′0″W

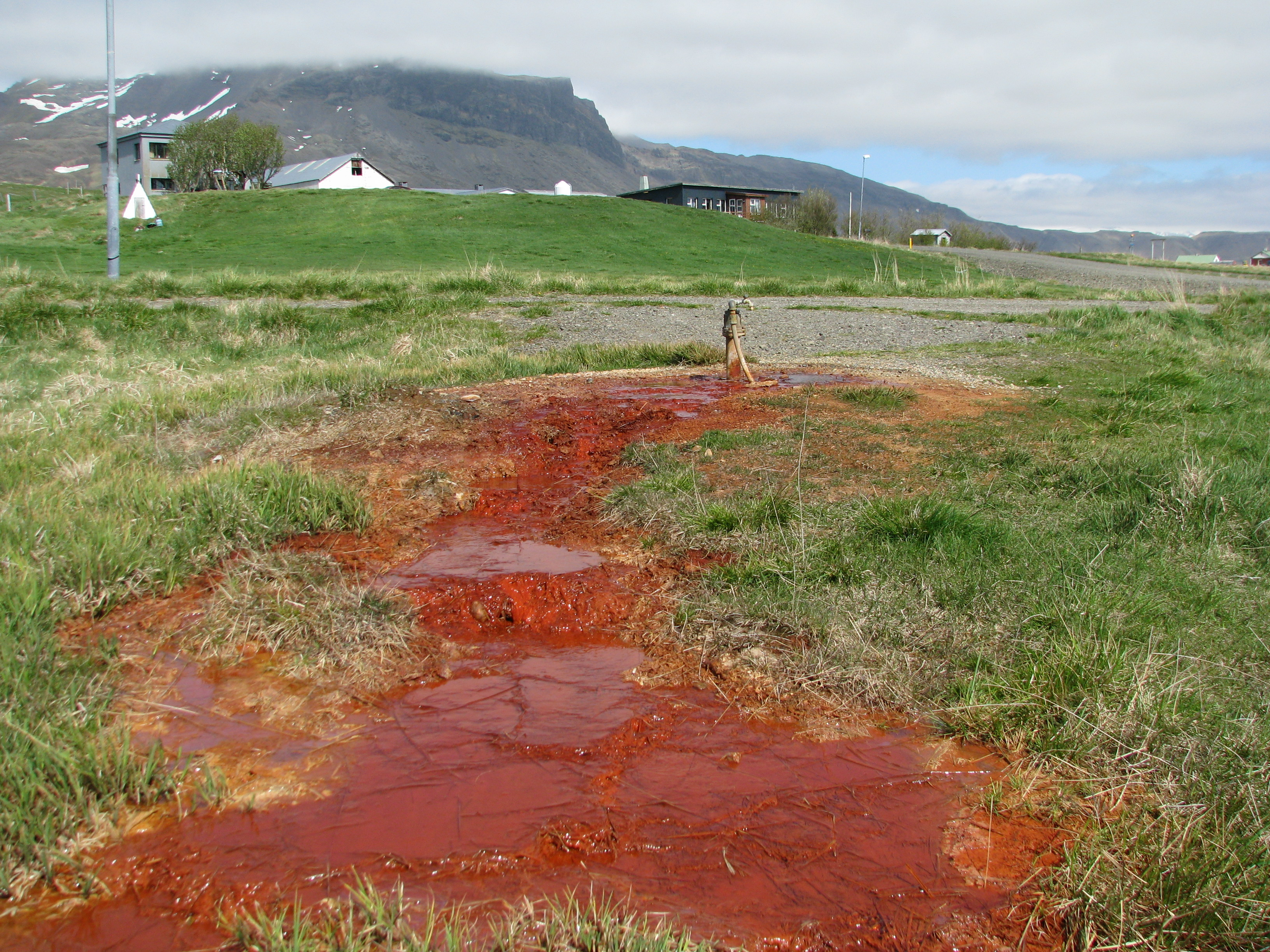
Ölkelda

Ölkelda (Icelandic pronunciation: [ˈœlˌcʰɛlta]) is a farm in the south side of the Snæfellsnes peninsular in Snæfellsbær municipality, Iceland, roughly 33 kilometres (21 mi) from Stykkishólmur. Ölkelda is the Icelandic term for mineral spring, derived from the Old Norse language and means "holy ale well", from the words öl (“ale”) and kelda (“spring, well”). It is these natural qualities that are found in natural earthen spring water on the premises of Ölkelda farm.

The water here has been regarded by locals as having special therapeutic properties for centuries, with the ability to heal diseases. The farmhouse was built in 1904. The stone-lined spring as of 1995 was free to access by the public.
