= The Book of Fantasy =

1940 anthology of short stories and poetry

- First edition (Spanish)
- Author: Anthology. Edited by Jorge Luis Borges, Adolfo Bioy Casares, and Silvina Ocampo
- Original title: Antología de la literatura fantástica
- Language: English & Spanish
- Series: Colección Laberinto
- Subject: Short stories and verse
- Genre: Fantasy
- Publisher: Editorial Sudamericana; Viking Penguin Inc.; Xanadu Publications Limited
- Publication date: 1940
- Publication place: Buenos Aires, Argentina; Great Britain
- English publication date: December 1988
- Media type: Hardcover
- Pages: 328 (1940); 384 (1988)
- ISBN: 0-670-82393-7 (Penguin edition)
- OCLC: 17803482
- Dewey Decimal: 808.83/876 19
- LC Class: PN6071.F25 A5513 1988

The Book of Fantasy is the English translation of Antología de la literatura fantástica, an anthology of approximately 81 fantastic short stories, fragments, excerpts, and poems edited by Jorge Luis Borges, Adolfo Bioy Casares, and Silvina Ocampo. It was first published in Argentina in 1940, and revised in 1965 and 1976. Anthony Kerrigan had previously translated a similar work by the same editors, Cuentos breves y extraordinarios (1955) as Extraordinary Tales, published by Herder & Herder in 1971. The 1988 Viking Penguin edition for English-speaking countries includes a foreword by Ursula K. Le Guin.

According to Le Guin's introduction, the idea and inspiration for this volume came into being "one night in 1937 in Buenos Aires, when Jorge Luis Borges, Adolfo Bioy Casares, and Silvina Ocampo fell to talking - so Casares tells us - 'about fantastic literature. ..simply a compilation of stories from fantastic literature which seemed to us to be the best.'"

== Contents ==
Pagination is given per the Penguin edition.

- Introduction. Ursula K. Le Guin (begins page 9)
- "Sennin". Ryūnosuke Akutagawa, The Three Treasures, 1951 (begins page 13)
  - This is a reworking of a Japanese Zen koan; the koan can be found in the collection Zen Flesh, Zen Bones.
- "A Woman Alone with Her Soul". Thomas Bailey Aldrich, 1912 (begins page 16)
- "Ben-Tobith". Leonid Andreyev, from his The Crushed Flower and Other Stories (begins page 17)
- "The Phantom Basket". John Aubrey, Miscellanies, 1696 (begins page 20)
- "The Drowned Giant". J. G. Ballard, The Terminal Beach, London: Gollancz, 1964 (begins page 21)
- "Enoch Soames". Max Beerbohm, The Century May ’16 (begins page 28)
- "The Tail of the Sphinx". Ambrose Bierce, San Francisco Examiner January 14, 1893. Later included in Bierce's Fantastic Fables
- "The Squid in Its Own Ink". From El Lado de La Sombra, 1962, Adolfo Bioy Casares; translated by Alexandra Potts (begins page 49)
- "Guilty Eyes". Ah‘med Ech Chiruani (no information besides the name is given about Chiruani) begins page 57)
- "Anything You Want!..." from Histoires Désobligeantes ("Disagreeable tales"), 1894, Léon Bloy; translated by Moira Banks, (begins page 58)
- "Tlön, Uqbar, Orbis Tertius". 1941, Jorge Luis Borges, Labyrinths, New Directions, 1962 (begins page 61)
- "Odin". Jorge Luis Borges & Delia Ingenieros, (begins page 73)
- "The Golden Kite, the Silver Wind" Ray Bradbury, Epoch Win ’53. Also in Bradbury's The Golden Apples of the Sun (begins page 73)
- "The Man Who Collected the First of September, 1973". Tor Åge Bringsvaerd; translated by Oddrun Grønvik, 1973 (begins page 77)
- "The Careless Rabbi". Martin Buber; translated by Olga Marx, Tales of the Hasidin, vol. 1, 1956 (begins page 81)
- "The Tale of the Poet". Sir Richard Burton (begins page 81)
- "Fate Is a Fool". Arturo Cancela, Pilar de Lusarreta; translated by Lucia Alvarez de Toledo & Alexandra Potts (begins page 82)
- "An Actual Authentic Ghost". From Sartor Resartus, Thomas Carlyle, 1834 (begins page 92)
- "The Red King’s Dream". From Through the Looking-Glass, Lewis Carroll, London: Macmillan, 1871 (begins page 92)
- "The Tree of Pride". G. K. Chesterton, The Trees of Pride, Cassell, 1922 (begins page 94)
- "The Tower of Babel". G. K. Chesterton, The Man Who Knew Too Much, Cassell, 1922 (begins page 95)
- "The Dream of the Butterfly or “Chuang Chu and the Butterfly”". Chuang Tzu; translated by Herbert A. Giles, 1926 (begins page 95)
- "The Look of Death". From Le Grand Ecart, Jean Cocteau, 1923 (begins page 96)
- "House Taken Over". Julio Cortázar, End of Game and Other Stories, Random House, 1967 (begins page 96)
- "Being Dust". Santiago Dabove, La Muerta y su Traje, 1961 (begins page 100)
- "A Parable of Gluttony". From With Mystics and Magicians in Tibet, Alexandra David-Neel, 1931 (begins page 104)
- "The Persecution of the Master". From With Mystics and Magicians in Tibet, Alexandra David-Neel, 1931 (begins page 105)
- "The Idle City". Lord Dunsany, Saturday Review (UK) April 10 ’09 (begins page 106)
- "Tantalia". Macedonio Fernández; translated by Lucia Alvarez de Toledo & Alexandra Potts - (begins page 110)
- "Eternal Life" J. G. Frazer 1913; Balder the Beautiful, Volume I. A Study in Magic and Religion: the Golden Bough, Part VII., The Fire-Festivals of Europe and the Doctrine of the External Soul (begins page 114)
- "A Secure Home". Elena Garro (begins page 115)
- "The Man Who Did Not Believe in Miracles". From Confucianism and Its Rivals, Herbert A. Giles, 1915 (begins page 123)
- "Earth’s Holocaust" Nathaniel Hawthorne, Graham’s Lady’s and Gentleman’s Magazine May, 1844 (begins page 124)
- "Ending for a Ghost Story". I. A. Ireland, 1919 (begins page 137)
- "The Monkey's Paw". W. W. Jacobs, Harper’s Monthly, September ’02 (begins page 137)
- "What Is a Ghost?". From Ulysses, James Joyce 1921 (begins page 145)
- "May Goulding". From Ulysses. James Joyce, 1921 (begins page 146)
- "The Wizard Passed Over". Don Juan Manuel, Libro de los ejemplos del conde Lucanor y de Patronio, Allen Lane, 1970 (begins page 147)
- "Josephine the Singer, or the Mouse Folk". March 1924, Franz Kafka (begins page 149)
- "Before the Law". Franz Kafka (begins page 160)
- "The Return of Imray". Rudyard Kipling, Mine Own People or Life's Handicap, New York: Hurst & Co., 1891; EQMM Sep ’58 (begins page 162)
- "The Horses of Abdera". Leopoldo Lugones; Las Fuerzas Extrañas, Buenos Aires, 1906. (begins page 170)
- "The Ceremony". Arthur Machen, Ornaments in Jade, New York: A.A. Knopf, 1924 (begins page 175)
- "The Riddle". Walter de la Mare, Monthly Review February ’03; The Riddle, and Other Stories (begins page 177)
- "Who Knows?". Guy de Maupassant April 6, 1890 (begins page 180)
- "The Shadow of the Players". From The Weekend Guide to Wales, Edwin Morgan (begins page 190)
  - Based on The Dream of Rhonabwy of the Mabinogion
- "The Cat". H. A. Murena (begins page 190)
- "The Story of the Foxes". Niu Chiao (begins page 192)
- "The Atonement". Silvina Ocampo, 1961 (begins page 193)
- "The Man Who Belonged to Me". Giovanni Papini; in Il Trangico Quoticliano, 1906. (begins page 202)
- "Rani". Carlos Peralta (begins page 208)
- "The Blind Spot". Barry Perowne, EQMM November ’45 (begins page 213)
- "The Wolf". From the Satyricon, Rome, 60 CE. Petronius (begins page 222)
- "The Bust". Manuel Peyrou (begins page 224)
- "The Cask of Amontillado", Edgar Allan Poe, Godey's Lady's Book November, 1846 (begins page 29)
- "The Tiger of Chao-ch’êng". From Liao Chai, 1679, P’u Sung Ling. Strange Stories from a Chinese Studio, De La Rue, 1880 (begins page 234)
- "How We Arrived at the Island of Tools". From Gargantua and Pantagruel. François Rabelais, 1564 (begins page 236)
- "The Music on the Hill". Saki, The Chronicles of Clovis, John Lane, 1911 (begins page 37)
- "Where Their Fire Is Not Quenched". May Sinclair, The English Review Oct ’22 (begins page 241)
- "The Cloth Which Weaves Itself". From Malay Magic. W. W. Skeat, 1900 (begins page 256)
- "Universal History". From Star Maker, Olaf Stapledon, London: Methuen, 1937 (begins page 257)
- "A Theologian in Death". Emanuel Swedenborg, Arcana Coelestia (1794), Allen Lane, 1970 (begins page 257)
- "The Encounter". From the Tang dynasty (618–906 CE) (begins page 259)
- "The Three Hermits". Leo Tolstoy, Twenty-Three Tales (begins page 260)
- "Macario". B. Traven The Night Visitor, and Other Stories, 1966 (begins page 265)
- "The Infinite Dream of Pao-Yu". Ts’ao Chan (Hsueh Ch’in), The Dream of the Red Chamber (begins page 291)
- "The Mirror to Wind-and-Moon". Ts’ao Chan (Hsueh Ch’in), The Dream of the Red Chamber (begins page 292)
- "The Desire to Be a Man". Villiers de l’Isle-Adam Contes Cruels, 1883 (begins page 294)
- "Memnon, or Human Wisdom". Voltaire, 1749; from Romances, Tales and Smaller Pieces of M. de Voltaire, Vol. 1 1794 (begins page 300)
- "The Man Who Liked Dickens". Evelyn Waugh Hearst's International September ’33 (begins page 304)
- "Pomegranate Seed". Edith Wharton, The Saturday Evening Post, April 25 ’31 (begins page 315)
- "Lukundoo" 1907 Edward Lucas White, Weird Tales, November ’25 (begins page 336)
- "The Donguys". Juan Rodolfo Wilcock (begins page 346)
- "Lord Arthur Savile’s Crime". Oscar Wilde, Court and Society Review, May 11, 1887 (begins page 353)
- "The Sorcerer of the White Lotus Lodge". Richard Wilhelm; translated by F. H. Martens; in Chinesische Volksmaerchen, 1924 (begins page 376)
- "The Celestial Stag". G. Willoughby-Meade, Chinese Ghouls and Goblins, Constable, 1928 (begins page 377)
- "Saved by the Book". G. Willoughby-Meade, Chinese Ghouls and Goblins, Constable, 1928 (begins page 377)
- "The Reanimated Englishman". Mary Wollstonecraft Shelley, Roger Dodsworth, 1826 (begins page 378)
- "The Sentence" from Monkey, 16th century, Wu Ch’Eng En; translated by Arthur Waley, 1921 (begins page 379)
- "The Sorcerers". William Butler Yeats, The Celtic Twilight, Lawrence & Bullen, 1893 (begins page 380)
- "Fragment" from Don Juan Tenorio, 1844, José Zorrilla (begins page 382)
