= Dodsworth =

Dodsworth may refer to:

== Arts and entertainment ==
- Dodsworth (novel), a 1929 novel by Sinclair Lewis
- Dodsworth (play), a 1934 play by Sidney Howard, adapted from the novel
- Dodsworth (film), a 1936 film with a screenplay by Howard, adapted from his play
- Dodsworth, a 1956 Producers' Showcase teleplay, adapted from Howard's play

== People ==
- Anna Dodsworth (c. 1740–1801), British romantic poet
- Geoffrey Dodsworth (1928–2018), British politician
- Matthew Dodsworth (c.1544–1631), English judge
- Roger Dodsworth (1585–1654), English antiquary
- Roger Dodsworth (hoax), a fictitious person named in an 1826 hoax, and the title character of a story by Mary Shelley based on the hoax
- Smith-Dodsworth baronets
