= Niu (surname) =

- Language: Chinese

Origin
- Meaning: "cow", "bull"

Niu (Chinese: 牛; pinyin: Niú) is a Chinese family name. It was listed 310th on the Song dynasty list of the Hundred Family Surnames. It means "ox". According to a 2013 study it was the 103rd most common surname at the time, shared by 2.20 million people, or 0.150% of the total population, with the province with the most being Henan.

== Prominent people with family name 牛 ==
- Consort Niu (牛昭容), a concubine said to be a power behind the throne after Tang emperor Shunzong suffered a stroke.
- Niu Ben (牛犇), stage name of Chinese actor Zhang Xuejing.
- Niu Fu (牛辅), general during the late Han dynasty and Three Kingdoms period.
- Niu Guannan (牛冠男), Chinese water polo player.
- Niu Huijun (牛惠君), international football referee.
- Niu Jianfeng (牛剑锋), Chinese bronze medallist in table tennis at the 2004 Athens Olympics.
- Niu Junfeng (牛骏峰), Chinese actor.
- Niu Jin (牛金), general during the late Han dynasty and Three Kingdoms period.
- Niu Lijie (牛丽杰), former Chinese women's national football team member.
- Rong Niu or Red Panda (born 1970/1971), Chinese American acrobat
- Niu Sengru (牛僧孺), chancellor for Tang emperors Muzong, Jingzong and Wenzong.
- Niu Weiyu (牛畏予), Chinese photojournalist and head of the Xinhua News Agency.
- Niu Xianke (牛仙客), chancellor for Tang emperor Xuanzong.
- Niu Yingzhen, poet
- Niu Yu (牛钰), Chinese disability rights advocate and politician
- Niu Zhiyuan (牛志远), Chinese sport shooter who competed in the 2000 Summer Olympics.
- Niu Zhizhong (牛志忠), member of China's 18th Central Committee from 2012, expelled from the Party in 2016.
- Niu Zhuang (牛壮), Chinese former professional snooker player.
- Thomas Niu Huiqing (牛会卿), Chinese Catholic bishop.
- Yuh-Line Niou (牛毓琳), New York State Assembly member
- Zhisheng Niu (牛志升), electrical engineering professor.
- Niu Chiao
- Niu Lizhi

== See also ==
- Niu (surname)
