= Smith-Dodsworth baronets =

Title in the Baronetage of Great Britain

Escutcheon of the Smith-Dodsworth baronets of Newland Park

The Smith, later Dodsworth, later Smith-Dodsworth baronetcy, of Newland Park in the County of York, is a title in the Baronetage of Great Britain. It was created on 22 January 1784 for John Silvester Smith, of Newland Park, Yorkshire. He married Henrietta, daughter of John Dodsworth, of Thornton Watlass Hall, Yorkshire, and sister and heiress of Frederick Dodsworth.

The 2nd Baronet assumed in 1821 by Royal licence the surname of Dodsworth in lieu of his patronymic. The 4th Baronet assumed the surname of Smith-Dodsworth. The 8th Baronet, an English-New Zealand naturalist, botanist, and plant conservationist, died on September 21, 2012.

== Smith, later Dodsworth, later Smith-Dodsworth baronets, of Newland Park (1784) ==
- Sir John Silvester Smith, 1st Baronet (1734–1789)
- Sir Edward Dodsworth, 2nd Baronet (1768–1845)
- Sir Charles Dodsworth, 3rd Baronet (1775–1857)
- Sir Matthew Smith-Dodsworth, 4th Baronet (1819–1858)
- Sir Charles Edward Smith-Dodsworth, 5th Baronet (1853–1891)
- Sir Matthew Blayney Smith-Dodsworth, 6th Baronet (1856–1931)
- Sir Claude Matthew Smith-Dodsworth, 7th Baronet (1888–1940)
- Sir John Christopher Smith-Dodsworth, 8th Baronet (1935–2012)
- Sir David John Smith-Dodsworth, 9th Baronet (born 1963)

The heir apparent is the present holder's only son Matthew David Smith-Dodsworth (born 2002).

== Dodsworth family ==
The Dodsworth family is descended from Lionel, Duke of Clarence, third son of King Edward III and Philippa of Hainault. The Thornton Watlass estate was acquired in 1415 by Thomas Dodsworth. Sir Edward Dodsworth, Commissary-General to the Parliamentary Army, Matthew Dodsworth and the antiquary Roger Dodsworth were later members of the family.

== Notes ==
Baronetage of Great Britain
Preceded by Rycroft baronets	Smith baronets of Newland Park; 22 January 1784	Succeeded by Lombe baronets
