= Listed buildings in Thornton Watlass =

Thornton Watlass is a civil parish in the county of North Yorkshire, England. It contains nine listed buildings that are recorded in the National Heritage List for England. Of these, one is listed at Grade I, the highest of the three grades, and the others are at Grade II, the lowest grade. The parish contains the village of Thornton Watlass and the surrounding area. The most important building in the parish is Thornton Watlass Hall, which is listed together with associated structures. The other listed buildings are a church, houses and cottages.

== Key ==
Grade	Criteria
I	Buildings of exceptional interest, sometimes considered to be internationally important
II	Buildings of national importance and special interest

== Buildings ==
Name and location	Photograph	Date	Notes	Grade
St Mary's Church; 54.26284°N 1.64469°W		15th century	The oldest part of the church is the tower, with the rest of the church added by G. Fowler Jones in 1868. The church is built in limestone and sandstone with a Welsh slate roof. It consists of a nave, a north aisle, a south porch, north and south transepts, a chancel, and a west tower. The tower is in Perpendicular,and has four stages, clasping buttresses, and a stair turret on the southeast. On each front are three separate bell openings in a double-chamfered surround, above which is a corbelled cornice, and an embattled parapet with corner pinnacles.	II
Thornton Watlass Hall and stable block 54.26923°N 1.64026°W	—	Early 16th century	A country house dating mainly from 1727. The earlier part has an H-shaped plan, and the later south front has a central range of three bays under a frieze and a parapet, and projecting two-bay gabled wings. The central doorway has an eared architrave, a keystone and a cornice, the windows are sashes, some with keystones, and at the rear is a mullioned stair window. Recessed on the right is the stable block, which contains a clock in a gabled dormer, with shaped kneelers and stone coping. On the roof is an octagonal bellcote with a dome and a finial.	I
High Row; 54.26488°N 1.64163°W	—	Mid-18th century	A row of five cottages in stone with stone slate roofs, most with two storeys. The main block has eight bays, two of the bays under a pediment with a blind round-arched window. To the right is a single-storey bay with a hipped roof, to the left is a recessed two-bay extension, and beyond it is a single bay. Most of the windows are horizontally sliding sashes, and on the upper floor of the main block are three casements.	II
The Old Rectory; 54.26467°N 1.64277°W	—	Mid-18th century	The house is in rendered stone, and has a stone slate roof with shaped kneelers and stone coping. There are two storeys and five bays, the left two bays recessed. The doorway has an architrave, a frieze, a cornice and a pediment. On the front are two canted bay windows, the left with a cornice, and the right with a hipped roof. The windows are sashes, some with segmental arches.	II
Gateway, Thornton Watlass Hall; 54.26747°N 1.63984°W		18th century	At the entrance to the drive are double gates flanked by piers, outside which are railings on low coped walls, and end piers. The gates and railings are in wrought iron with fleur-de-lys finials. The piers are in rusticated stone, and each has a plinth, a frieze, a cornice and blocking course, and is surmounted by a reeded urn.	II
Piers north of Thornton Watlass Hall; 54.27493°N 1.63749°W	—	18th century	The two piers are in stone and have a square plan. Each pier has a plinth, a cornice, a blocking course and a ball finial.	II
Warley Cottage; 54.26634°N 1.64047°W	—	Mid-18th century	The house is in rendered stone, and has a Welsh slate roof with shaped kneelers and stone coping on the right. There are two storeys and two bays. In the centre is a latticed porch and a doorway. The windows are sashes, those on the upper floor horizontally sliding. All the openings have stone surrounds and keystones.	II
Longhurst; 54.26451°N 1.63908°W	—	Late 18th century	The house is in stone with a pantile roof. There are two storeys and two bays. The central doorway and the windows, which are sashes, have flat brick arches.	II
6 and 7 The Green; 54.26520°N 1.64149°W	—	Early 19th century	A pair of cottages in stone with a hipped stone slate roof. There are two storeys and three bays. On the outer parts of the cottages are two doorways with plain surrounds, the windows are sashes, and all the openings have flat stuccoed arches.	II
