= Cancela =

Cancela is a surname. Notable people with the surname include:

- Arturo Cancela (1882–1957), Argentine novelist and critic
- Dani Cancela (born 1981), Spanish Galician footballer
- José Cancela (born 1976), Uruguayan soccer player
- Yvanna Cancela, American politician

== See also ==
- Paleontological Site Arroio Cancela, in the city of Santa Maria, a municipality of Rio Grande do Sul, the southernmost state of Brazil
