= Dabove =

Dabove is an Italian surname. Notable people with the surname include:

- Diego Dabove (born 1973), Argentine football manager and player
- Santiago Dabove (1889–1951), Argentine author
