= Church of St Mary the Virgin, Thornton Watlass =

Anglican church in North Yorkshire, England

Church of St Mary the Virgin
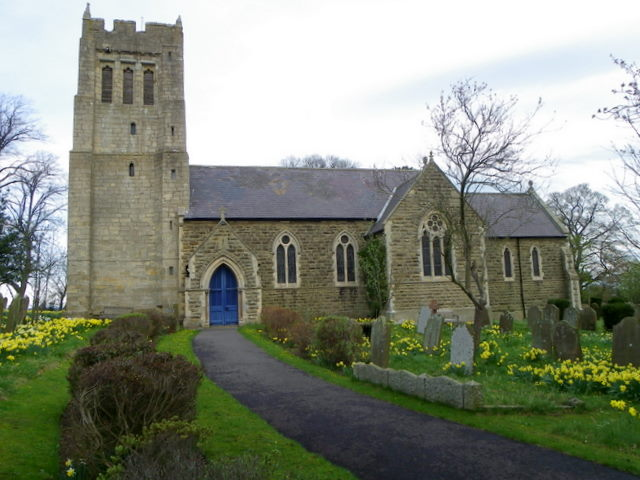
- Church of St Mary the Virgin
- 54.2628°N 1.6446°W
- OS grid reference: SE 23244 85299
- Location: Thornton Watlass, North Yorkshire
- Country: England
- Denomination: Church of England
- Website: www.achurchnearyou.com/church/3307/

History
- Status: Parish church
- Other dedication: 18 December 1867 (reconsecrated)

Architecture
- Functional status: Active

Administration
- Diocese: Leeds
- Archdeaconry: Richmond and Craven
- Deanery: Wensley
- Benefice: Bedale and Leeming and Thornton Watlass
- Parish: Thornton Watlass (646583)

Listed Building – Grade II
- Designated: 22 August 1966
- Reference no.: 1314992

The Church of St Mary the Virgin is a grade II listed building in the village of Thornton Watlass, North Yorkshire, England. The tower dates back to the 15th century, but the rest of the church was entirely rebuilt in the 1860s, reopening in December 1867. The church forms part of the Benefice of Bedale, along with the Church of St Gregory (Bedale), the Church of John the Baptist (Leeming), and Burrill Mission Church.

== History ==
The Church of St Mary the Virgin lies to the south-west of the village of Thornton Watlass. It is thought that various Anglo-Saxon stone crosses unearthed in the Thornton Watlass area point to early worship in the area, and whilst the tower dates to the 15th century, the first documented evidence of a rector for the church is from the 12th century, when John persona de watlous, is thought to have been the rector at Watlass and the Dean of Catterick. Another mention in 1254 of Wathlous, is an agreement for the parishes in the area to restrict how many cattle and chickens they may possess, but this does not specifically mention a vicar or rector. The advowson awarded to Thornton Watlass is first noted in 1263, with the church being located in the village of Wattelaus.

The chancel measures 35 feet (11 m) by 18 feet (5.5 m), the nave is 51 feet 9 inches (15.77 m) by 21 feet (6.4 m), the north aisle is 9 feet 6 inches (2.90 m) wide, and the south transept is 15 feet (4.6 m) by 9 feet (2.7 m). Aside from the tower, the church was entirely rebuilt in the 1860s (possibly to a design by G. Fowler Jones). (Note: A contemporary sketch of the church from 1840 shows the church roof to be quite low (devoid of a clerestory) and almost flat in nature, with a door at the south-east end (opposite side to the tower).) The tower has a set of stairs at the south-east corner, and the tower has two floors, one with a fireplace and the other with rooms for habitation. This has led to speculation that the tower could be used as a place of refuge when the village was under attack, just like the tower in nearby Bedale. The tower is in the Decorated style, and Pevsner notes that the bell-openings are three separate single lights, "..a very uncommon pattern". The tower has three bells: the first is inscribed with 1694 and the Latin text of Gloria in altissimis deo, the second Soli deo gloria pax hominibus and 1712, and the third just dated 1825. Glynne described the tower as being akin to the one at Bedale (the Church of St Gregory) in that it possibly provided protection from attacking or marauding forces, but that its design was of a "plainer" character. The tower, which is about 80 feet (24 m) in height, is composed of four stages, and at the top the parapet is embattled and has a pinnacle in each corner.

The new church, which cost £1,800, (equivalent to £174,000 in 2025) was rebuilt in the 1860s (the old church was demolished), and was consecrated by the Bishop of Ripon on 18 December 1867. The 1867 church is made from rubblestone, limestone, sandstone and ashlar, with a Welsh slate roof. Glynne, who visited in May 1871, just over three years after its rebuilding, described the church as being "...not a bad specimen for a new church...", and it was grade II listed in 1966. A survey of the churchyard in the late 1990s determined that it had over 290 graves, and the interior of the church had over 40 monumental inscriptions commemorating the dead. A stone cross is located in the churchyard which has the names of the war dead from both the First and Second World Wars. The church lies outside of the Thornton Watlass conservation area.

James Margetson, who later became the Church of Ireland Archbishop of Armagh, was the rector at St Mary's between 1626 and 1635.

== Benefice and parish ==
Historically, the church was in the Deanery of Catterick, part of the Archdeaconry of Richmond in the Diocese of Chester. In the 21st century, it is its own parish in the benefice of Bedale and Leeming and Thornton Watlass, the Deanery of Wensley, Archdeaconry of Richmond and Craven, in the Diocese of Leeds.

== See also ==
- Listed buildings in Thornton Watlass
