= Listed buildings in Bedale =

Bedale is a civil parish in the county of North Yorkshire, England. It contains 57 listed buildings that are recorded in the National Heritage List for England. Of these, three are listed at Grade I, the highest of the three grades, and the others are at Grade II, the lowest grade. The parish contains the market town of Bedale and the surrounding area. Apart from a bridge, all the listed buildings are in the town. Most of these consist of houses, cottages and associated structures, shops and offices, and the others include a church and its gateway, a market cross, a former grammar school, public houses, a post office, harbour walls and a weir, a former workhouse, a war memorial and a telephone kiosk.

== Key ==
| Grade | Criteria |
|---|---|
| I | Buildings of exceptional interest, sometimes considered to be internationally important |
| II | Buildings of national importance and special interest |

== Buildings ==
| Name and location | Photograph | Date | Notes | Grade |
|---|---|---|---|---|
| Church of St Gregory; 54.29101°N 1.59350°W | | 13th century | The church has been altered and extended through the centuries, including a restoration in 1854–57 by Fowler Jones. It is built in stone with roofs of slate and lead, and consists of a nave with a clerestory, north and south aisles, a chancel with a north vestry, and a west tower with a south porch. The tower has five stages, with buttresses, a stair turret, a clock face on the south side, gargoyles at the corners, and an embattled parapet with eight pinnacles. On the west side is a doorway with two chamfered orders and a hood mould, above which is a three-light window, three tiers of two-light windows, and two-light flat-headed bell openings. The porch is gabled, and has a chamfered doorway with a pointed arch and a hood mould, over which is an ogee-headed niche. There are embattled parapets on the body of the church. | I |
| Market Cross; 54.28948°N 1.59300°W | | 14th century | The market cross is in stone, and consists of a tall octagonal shaft on a stepped octagonal base. It has a chamfered projecting band near the top, an octagonal capstone, and is surmounted by an iron cross. | I |
| 23–29 North End; 54.28991°N 1.59304°W | — | 16th century (probable) | A house, later two shops, with a timber-framed core, encased in stone in the 18th century, it is rendered, and has a pantile roof with the lower courses in stone slate, hipped to the right. There are two storeys and four bays, the right bay projecting. In the ground floor is a central passageway, flanked by late 19th-century shopfronts, and to the right is a doorway and a sash window. The upper floor contains sash windows, and inside there is exposed timber framing. | II |
| 7 and 9 North End; 54.29035°N 1.59329°W | — | Late 16th century (probable) | A pair of houses with a cruck frame core, later used for other purposes, they are in stone with a pantile roof. There are two storeys and three bays. On the front are two doorways flanking a passage entry, to the right is a bow window, and the other windows on the front are casements. At the rear is a tall gabled stair tower with mullioned windows, and inside are two raised crucks. | II |
| Cottage in churchyard 54.29068°N 1.59351°W | | 1674 | Originally a grammar school, later used as a house, it is stone with quoins and a stone slate roof. There is a single storey and two bays. The central doorway has a chamfered quoined surround, and a dated four-centred arched lintel, and the windows are sashes. | II |
| 21 North End; 54.29001°N 1.59307°W | — | Late 17th century (probable) | A house, later with a shop, in rendered brick with an eaves band and a tile roof. There are two storeys and two bays. In the ground floor is a 20th-century shopfront, to the right is a doorway, and the windows are sashes. | II |
| 31 and 33 North End; 54.28976°N 1.59292°W | — | Late 17th century (probable) | Two houses with shops, they are rendered, and have an eaves band, and a tile roof with stone coping on the left. There are two storeys and four bays. In the centre is a doorway with pilasters, a frieze, and a cornice on consoles. This is flanked by 20th-century shopfronts, and in the upper floor are sash windows. | II |
| St Gregory House and wall 54.29150°N 1.59435°W | — | c. 1700 | The house is in red brick, with a stepped floor band, a dentilled cornice, and a tile roof with stone coping and shaped kneelers. There are two storeys and five bays. Five steps lead up to the central doorway that has a projecting surround, a fanlight, and a moulded triangular pediment. The windows are sashes with flat brick arches, set in raised panels. The attached wall is in brick with stone coping and ball finials, and contains an opening. | II |
| 24 and 26 Market Place; 54.28846°N 1.59231°W | — | Early 18th century | A pair of houses and shops in rendered red brick with a tile roof. There are three storeys and four bays. In the second bay is a doorway with Doric pilasters on plinths, an entablature, a frieze and a cornice, the third bay contains a modern casement window, and these are flanked by 19th-century shopfronts. The upper floors contain sash windows. | II |
| Gatehouse, Bedale Hall; 54.28922°N 1.59552°W | | Early 18th century | The gatehouse is in brick and stone, with a floor band, an eaves cornice, and a pyramidal stone slate roof. There are two storeys and a single bay. In the ground floor are blocked round arches with moulded impost bands, and the upper floor contains sash windows with flat brick arches. | II |
| Lodge southwest of the gatehouse 54.28911°N 1.59571°W | — | Early 18th century | The lodge to Bedale Hall, later a private house, it is in brick with stepped dentilled eaves and a hipped stone slate roof. There are two storeys and three bays. In the centre is a doorway with an architrave, the windows are sashes, and all the openings have flat brick arches. | II |
| 8 North End and railings 54.28985°N 1.59377°W | — | c. 1732 | A house in red brick, with a floor band, and a tile roof with stone coping and shaped kneelers. There are three floors and a basement, and five bays. Three steps lead up to the central doorway that has a Doric doorcase with attached columns and an open dentilled pediment, and a door with a radial fanlight. The windows are sashes with flat brick arches. Along the front of the house are wrought iron railings with spear finials. | II |
| Bedale Hall; 54.29032°N 1.59410°W | | c. 1735 | A large house in stone and brick, partly rendered, with a stone slate roof and two storeys. The main front has nine bays, the west front has eleven bays, and the east front has six bays, south of which is a recessed five-bay range. The middle five bays of the main front project, the middle three bays projecting further under a triangular dentilled pediment. In the centre is an Ionic portico with a frieze, a cornice and a triangular pediment. The windows are sashes with a variety of surrounds. On the west front is a semicircular Doric porch with a frieze, a cornice and a blocking course, and a doorway with an architrave and a fanlight, and there is another Doric porch on the east front. | I |
| Amen House, walls, former fives court, store and yard 54.28998°N 1.59506°W | | c. 1735 | The house and associated buildings are in brick and limestone with roofs of slate, pantile and tile. The house has two storeys, and a main range of five bays, the middle three bays projecting under a pediment with a stepped and dentilled cornice. The doorway is in a round-arched recess, and has an architrave, a frieze, a cornice and a pediment, and the windows are a mix of sashes and casements. A wall extends from the house to the former fives court, and beyond to the store. The fives court is in brick and has machicolations and an embattled parapet., and the store is in brick and stone and has two storeys. | II |
| 1 and 3 Market Place; 54.28948°N 1.59265°W | | Early to mid 18th century | A pair of houses, later shops, in red brick on a plinth, with stepped dentilled eaves, and a pantile roof with stone coping on the left. There are three storeys and four bays. In the ground floor are late 19th-century shopfronts with a frieze and a cornice, and the upper floors contain sash windows with flat brick arches. | II |
| 2 and 4 Market Place; 54.28923°N 1.59321°W | — | Early to mid 18th century | A house, later two shops, in red brick, with stepped dentilled eaves, and a pantile roof with copings and hipped to the right. There are three storeys and three bays. In the ground floor are two shopfronts, the left with pilasters, a frieze and a dentilled cornice, and the right one dating from the 20th century. The upper floors contain sash windows with flat brick arches. | II |
| 8 Market Place; 54.28904°N 1.59305°W | — | Early to mid 18th century | A house and shop in red brick with stepped dentilled eaves and a stone slate roof. There are three storeys and four bays. In the ground floor is a 20th-century shopfront, to its right is a passage entry, and further to the right is a doorway with an architrave, a fanlight and a flat brick arch. The upper floors contain sash windows under flat brick arches. | II |
| 10 Market Place; 54.28893°N 1.59295°W | — | Early to mid 18th century | A pair of houses and shops in red brick, with dentilled eaves, and a Welsh slate roof with coping and shaped kneelers. There are three storeys and four bays. In the ground floor is a central doorway with pilasters, flanked by 20th-century shopfronts, and the upper floors contain sash windows with flat brick arches. | II |
| 12 Market Place; 54.28885°N 1.59286°W | — | Early to mid 18th century | A house and shops in painted brick, with dentilled eaves, and a Welsh slate roof with stone coping and shaped kneelers. There are three storeys and four bays. To the left of the ground floor is a round-headed doorway with pilasters, a fanlight and an open pediment, and to the right are two 20th-century shopfronts. The upper floors contain sash windows with flat brick arches. | II |
| 14 Market Place; 54.28876°N 1.59275°W | — | Early to mid 18th century | A house and shops in painted brick, with dentilled eaves, and a tile roof with stone coping. There are three storeys and five bays. In the ground floor are two 20th-century shopfronts, and the upper floors contain sash windows with flat brick arches. | II |
| 17 Market Place; 54.28908°N 1.59230°W | — | Early to mid 18th century | A house, later two shops, in red brick that has a Welsh slate roof with stone coping and shaped kneelers. There are three storeys and five bays. In the ground floor are two late 19th to 20th-century shopfronts. The upper floors contain blind windows in the third and fifth bays, and elsewhere the windows are sashes. | II |
| 25 Market Place; 54.28874°N 1.59194°W | — | Early to mid 18th century | A house and a shop in red brick with stepped dentilled eaves and a stone slate roof. There are three storeys and four bays. In the ground floor is an early 20th-century shopfront, flanked by doorways with fanlights. The upper floors contain sash windows. | II |
| 36 and 38 Market Place; 54.28829°N 1.59200°W | | Early to mid 18th century | A house, later two shops, in red brick with dentilled eaves and a tile roof. There are three storeys and three bays. In the centre is a doorway with an architrave, flanked by late 19th- to 20th-century shopfronts. The upper floors contain sash windows, one tripartite. | II |
| 4 and 6 North End; 54.28997°N 1.59384°W | — | Early to mid 18th century | A house, later with offices, in red brick, with floor bands, a stepped eaves band, and a Welsh slate roof with stone coping on the right. There are three storeys and five bays. In the centre is a doorway with a fanlight, the windows are sashes, and all the openings have stuccoed wedge lintels. | II |
| 10 North End; 54.28974°N 1.59368°W | — | Early to mid 18th century | A house in rendered brick on a plinth, with a Welsh slate roof. There are three storeys and four bays, Four steps with railings lead up to the doorway in the second bay, that has pilasters, and a frieze and a cornice on consoles. Above the doorway are blind windows, and the other windows are sashes. | II |
| 12 and 14 North End; 54.28961°N 1.59360°W | — | Early to mid 18th century | A pair of red brick houses with dentilled eaves, and a tile roof with stone coping and a shaped kneeler on the right. There are three storeys and six bays. In the second and fourth bays are doorways, each in an architrave, with a divided fanlight. Above these doorways are blind windows, and the other windows are sashes, one with two lights and one tripartite window. All the openings have flat brick arches. | II |
| 16 North End; 54.28952°N 1.59350°W | — | Early to mid 18th century | The house is in red brick on a plinth, with dentilled eaves, and a tile roof with stone coping. There are three storeys and five bays. Two steps lead up to the central doorway that has Doric half-columns, a Gothic fanlight, a frieze and a cornice. The windows are sashes with flat brick arches. | II |
| 20 North End; 54.28936°N 1.59333°W | — | Early to mid 18th century | A house and shop on a corner site in rendered brick with a pantile roof. There are two storeys and three bays. In the ground floor is a 20th-century shopfront, and the upper floors contain sash windows. | II |
| 11 and 13 South End; 54.28796°N 1.59090°W | — | Early to mid 18th century | A pair of houses in red brick with stepped eaves and a pantile roof. There are two storeys and two bays. On the front are two doorways and sash windows, all with flat brick arches. | II |
| House south of Bedale Hall; 54.29009°N 1.59391°W | — | Early to mid 18th century | The house, later offices, is in red brick with stepped and dentilled eaves and a tile roof, coped on the left and hipped on the right. There are two storeys and four bays. In the left bay is a basket-arched carriage entrance, and the windows are sashes with flat brick arches. | II |
| Green Dragon; 54.28869°N 1.59263°W | | Early to mid 18th century | The public house is in red brick on a plinth, with dentilled eaves, and a tile roof with stone coping. There are three storeys and four bays The main doorway has a Doric surround, with a frieze and a cornice, and it is flanked by canted bay windows with sash windows, a frieze, a cornice and a blocking course. To the left is a doorway with a fanlight and a flat brick arch, and the windows are sashes with flat brick arches. | II |
| Kings Head; 54.28820°N 1.59183°W | | Early to mid 18th century | A public house, later used for other purposes, it is in rendered brick on a plinth, and has a Welsh slate roof with stone coping. There are three storeys and four bays. In the second bay is a doorway with pilasters, a fanlight, consoles, a frieze and a cornice. This is flanked by canted bay windows, and in the right bay is a carriage entrance with pilasters on plinths, a frieze and a cornice. The windows in the middle floor are sashes, and in the top floor they are casements. | II |
| The Post Office; 54.28912°N 1.59313°W | | Early to mid 18th century | The post office is in painted brick on a plinth, with stepped dentilled eaves, and a slate roof with stone coping. There are three storeys and five bays. The doorway in the right bay has pilasters, a fanlight, consoles, a frieze and a cornice, and the windows are sashes with flat brick arches. | II |
| 5, 5A and 7 Market Place; 54.28937°N 1.59254°W | — | Mid 18th century | A house, later two shops, in red brick, with sill bands, stepped dentilled eaves, and a Welsh slate roof with stone coping. There are three storeys and five bays. In the ground floor is a central doorway in an architrave, with a Gothic fanlight, a frieze and a pediment, flanked by 20th-century shopfronts. The upper floors contain sash windows with flat brick arches. | II |
| 9 and 11 Market Place; 54.28927°N 1.59249°W | — | Mid 18th century | A house, later two shops, in red brick, with dentilled eaves, and a Welsh slate roof. There are three storeys and three bays. In the ground floor is a central doorway with pilasters on plinths, a four-pane fanlight, a frieze with paterae, and a cornice, flanked by 20th-century shopfronts. The upper floors contain sash windows, those in the middle floor with flat brick arches. | II |
| 13 Market Place; 54.28919°N 1.59243°W | | Mid 18th century | A house and a shop in rendered brick, with an eaves band, and a tile roof with stone coping on the left. There are three storeys and three bays. In the ground floor, on the right, is a round-headed passage opening, and to the left is a late 19th-century shopfront with a frieze and a cornice. The upper floors contain sash windows. | II |
| 15 Market Place; 54.28915°N 1.59239°W | | Mid 18th century | A house and a shop in rendered red brick, with an eaves band, and a slate roof. There are three storeys and two bays. In the ground floor is a 20th-century shopfront, and the upper floors contain sash windows. | II |
| 18 Market Place; 54.28863°N 1.59255°W | | Mid 18th century | A house and a shop in rendered red brick with a Welsh slate roof. There are three storeys and two bays. In the ground floor are two doorways, each with pilasters on plinths, a frieze and a cornice. The left doorway is flanked by a 19th-century shopfront with bay windows under a frieze and an entablature. The upper floors contain sash windows. | II |
| 21 Market Place; 54.28892°N 1.59212°W | — | Mid 18th century | Two houses, later a shop, in red brick, with stepped dentilled eaves, and a tile roof with stone coping on the left. There are three storeys and five bays. In the ground floor is a 20th-century shopfront and a doorway to the right. The middle bays of the upper floors are blind, and the other bays contain a mix of sash and casement windows. | II |
| 23 Market Place; 54.28883°N 1.59204°W | — | Mid 18th century | A house later used for other purposes, and at one time a bank, it is in red brick, and has a stone slate roof with raised verges and stone coping. There are three storeys and four bays. In the ground floor are two doorways with divided fanlights, between which are four windows, all flanked by fluted Ionic columns, over which is a frieze and a cornice. The upper floors contain sash windows with flat brick arches. | II |
| Gateway, Church of St Gregory; 54.29063°N 1.59364°W | | Mid 18th century | Flanking the entrance to the churchyard is a pair of rusticated stone gate piers. Each pier has a plinth, a cornice and an obelisk finial. | II |
| Oak House; 54.28965°N 1.59286°W | — | 18th century | A house with offices and a shop in red brick, with stepped dentilled eaves, and a tile roof with stone coping and shaped kneelers on the left, and hipped on the right. There are three storeys and five bays. The second bay contains a doorway that has an architrave with reeded pilasters, a fanlight, a frieze and a cornice. The first, third and fourth bays contain canted bay windows, each with a frieze and a dentilled cornice. In the right bay is a later 19th-century shopfront with a central doorway, flanked by bay windows under a frieze and a cornice. The upper floors contain sash windows with flat brick arches. | II |
| Old Black Swan; 54.28899°N 1.59221°W | | Mid 18th century | The public house is in painted red brick with an eaves band and a stone slate roof. There are three storeys and four bays. The second bay contains a porch with two columns, a frieze and a cornice, flanked by canted bay windows on a plinth, with a frieze and a cornice. In the right bay is a doorway with an architrave and a flat brick arch. The windows in the upper floors are sashes with flat brick arches. | II |
| The Three Coopers; 54.28954°N 1.59246°W | | Mid 18th century | The public house is in red brick on a plinth. The main part has three storeys and three bays, a tile roof and floor bands. The central doorway has an architrave with pilasters, a frieze, and a cornice on consoles, and the windows are sashes with flat brick arches. To the left is a two-storey bay with a slate roof, and in its upper floor is a canted bay window. | II |
| Waggon and Horses; 54.28856°N 1.59249°W | | Mid 18th century | The public house and shop are in rendered red brick on a plinth, with a floor band, and a Welsh slate roof with a coped left gable and kneelers. There are three storeys and four bays. The left bay contains a late 19th-century shopfront with a frieze and a cornice, and in the third bay is a doorway with pilasters on plinths, a frieze and a cornice. The other ground floor bays contain casement windows in architraves, and in the upper floors are sash windows. | II |
| Harbour walls and weir 54.28774°N 1.58805°W | | 1768 | The weir in Bedale Beck and the harbour walls are in stone. The weir has three tiers, and the walls form an L-shaped plan. There are the remains of wooden sluice gates, and two iron rings in the walls. | II |
| Ice house, Bedale Hall; 54.28974°N 1.59638°W | — | Late 18th century | The ice house to the west of the hall is in red brick and stone. The entrance has a stone surround, leading to a brick-arched passage about 17 feet (5.2 m) long. At the end is a brick chamber 10 feet (3.0 m) in diameter and 14 feet (4.3 m) deep, with a shallow brick dome. | II |
| Flood Bridge; 54.28249°N 1.56285°W | | Late 18th century | The bridge carries the B6285 road over the Main Cut. It is in stone, and consists of a single segmental arch, with voussoirs, a band and a coped parapet. | II |
| 13–19 North End; 54.29019°N 1.59318°W | — | 1786 | A row of houses and shops in red brick with dentilled eaves and a tile roof. There are two storeys and seven bays. The ground floor contains a doorway with a fanlight and a flat brick arch, an elliptical carriage arch with imposts and a dated keystone, and 20th-century shopfronts. Most of the windows are sashes, there is a casement window, and most windows have flat brick arches. | II |
| 4 and 6 The Wynd and smithy 54.28886°N 1.59453°W | | Late 18th to early 19th century | The pair of cottages and attached former smithy are in red brick. The cottages have a tile roof, two storeys and three bays. On the front are two doorways, the right one blocked, and sash windows, those in the ground floor with segmental heads. The smithy to the right has a pantile roof, stepped dentilled eaves, a single storey and two bays. On the left is a carriage entrance with a segmental relieving arch, and to the right is a horizontally-sliding sash window. | II |
| 28, 32 and 34 Market Place; 54.28837°N 1.59214°W | — | Early 19th century | Two houses, later three shops with living accommodation, in red brick with stone dressings, oversailing eaves and a tile roof. There are three storeys and four bays. In the ground floor are a doorway and three late 19th-century shopfronts. The upper floors contain sash windows with stuccoed wedge lintels. | II |
| 29 and 31 Market Place and room above 54.28868°N 1.59184°W | — | Early 19th century | At one time a town hall, later two shops, in red brick on a plinth, with an eaves band, and a Welsh slate roof with stone coping. There are two storeys and four bays. In each outer bay is a doorway with a fanlight and a cambered wedge lintel. Between them are two shopfronts, the left dating from the 20th century, and the right from the 19th century, with a central doorway, plate glass windows, a frieze and a cornice. The upper floor contains tall sash windows with cambered wedge lintels. | II |
| Albert Row; 54.28893°N 1.59114°W | — | Early 19th century | A row of three cottages in stone and brick with a pantile roof. There are two storeys and three bays. Each cottage has a doorway with a segmental arch, an architrave and a fanlight. The windows are sashes with segmental heads. | II |
| Mowbray Grange; 54.28608°N 1.58812°W | | 1839 | A workhouse later converted for other uses, it is in limestone, with a sill band and hipped Welsh slate roofs. It consists of a central block with three storeys and three bays, flanked by two-storey, three-bay wings, ending in two-storey single-bay pedimented pavilions. In the centre is a doorway with a fanlight, consoles and a cornice. This is flanked by round-arched windows in segmental arches, above which are sash windows in the middle floor, and casements in the top floor. The windows in the wings are sashes, and in each pavilion is a full-height round arch containing a sash window in the ground floor and a Diocletian window above. | II |
| 3 North End; 54.29123°N 1.59397°W | | Mid 19th century | The house is in brick on a stone plinth, with a stone band in the middle bay, and an oversailing Welsh slate roof, hipped over the middle bay. There are two storeys and three bays, the middle bay projecting. In the centre is a doorway with a rusticated stuccoed surround, a fanlight and sidelights, above which is a cornice and blocking course in the shape of a pediment. The windows are sashes with cambered brick arches. | II |
| War memorial 54.29074°N 1.59362°W | | 1920 | The war memorial is in the churchyard of the Church of St Gregory, and is in sandstone. It consists of a Saxon cross with a tapering shaft on a chamfered base on three square stone steps. On the front of the shaft is an inscription, above which are relief carvings of Christ and Saint George. | II |
| Telephone kiosk 54.28911°N 1.59301°W | | 1935 | The K6 type telephone kiosk in Market Place was designed by Giles Gilbert Scott. Constructed in cast iron with a square plan and a dome, it has three unperforated crowns in the top panels. | II |
