= Thornton Watlass =

Village and civil parish in North Yorkshire, England

Coordinates: 54.264909°N 1.638395°W

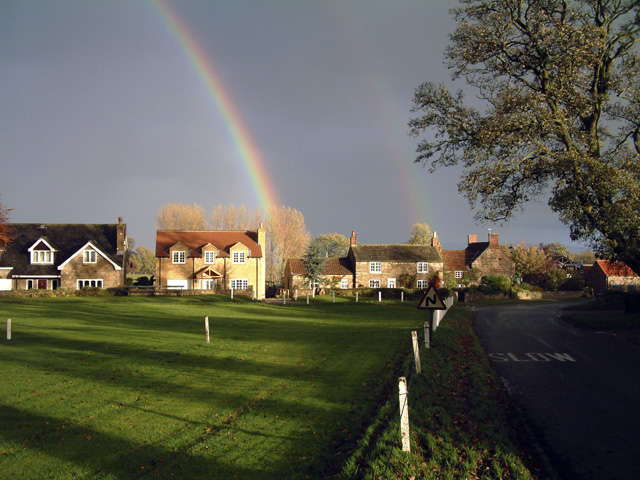
- Looking east across Thornton Watlass village green

- Location within North Yorkshire
- Population: 240 (2016 estimate)
- OS grid reference: SE235855
- Unitary authority: North Yorkshire
- Ceremonial county: North Yorkshire
- Region: Yorkshire and the Humber
- Country: England
- Sovereign state: United Kingdom
- Post town: RIPON
- Postcode district: HG4
- Dialling code: 01677
- Police: North Yorkshire
- Fire: North Yorkshire
- Ambulance: Yorkshire

Thornton Watlass is a small village and civil parish in North Yorkshire, England. It is located north of Masham and south of Bedale on the eastern slopes of the Ure Valley at the entrance to Wensleydale and the Yorkshire Dales National Park. It is 11 miles (18 km) north of Ripon, 4 miles (6.4 km) from the A1(M) motorway, 11 miles (18 km) from the main railway line at Northallerton and 18 miles (29 km) from Teesside Airport. Its population was 180 in 2000, 190 in 2005, 224 in 2011 and 240 in 2016.

The village lies at the junction of Watlass Lane and Watlass Moor Lane. At the centre of the village is the triangular village green with its trees, cricket pitch and children's playground, surrounded by houses, some of which are built from local stone. Thornton Watlass Church dates from the 15th century and the village also has a primary school and a public house called the Buck Inn. The village forms part of the Thornton Watlass Estate, and Thornton Watlass Hall, an ancient two-storey gabled stone house, lies just to the north of the village.

== History ==
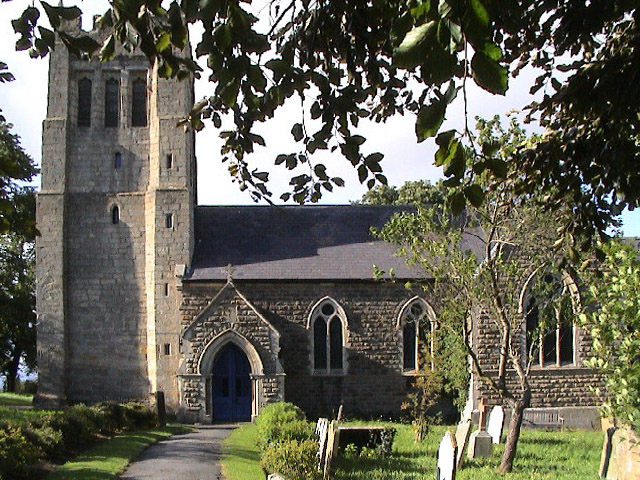
St Mary's Church, Thornton Watlass, with a medieval tower and Victorian nave

A prehistoric feature in the Thornton Watlass area is Gospel Hill tumulus, a scheduled monument, at grid reference SE228862 about 1 km northwest of the village. The site of the priory is now a scheduled monument.

Saxon remains of two cross-heads are evidence that people lived in the area before the Norman Conquest in 1066. They are on display in Thornton Watlass Church.

The Domesday Book of 1086 mentions the separate villages of Thornton and Watlass. Before the Norman conquest the Saxon owners of these villages were Ulward and Stan; however Thornton is shown in the Domesday Book as being owned by Ribald, brother of Alan Earl of Richmond. Thornton Watlass Hall and estate have been owned by the Dodsworth family since 1415.

The Anglican Church of St Mary the Virgin stands a little way outside the village to the southwest. It was rebuilt, with the exception of the tower, in 1868 in the Perpendicular style. The tower contains some living accommodation (including a toilet) and was probably used as a place of safety in times of strife.

The village school was built in 1872.

== Thornton Watlass today ==
Today the village has about fifty houses and a few farms, with a population of 222 at the 2011 Census. Until 2023, Thornton Watlass was part of the Richmond (Yorks) parliamentary constituency. It was removed and added to the expanded Thirsk and Malton Constituency, in part due to areas from that constituency being created into a new seat of Wetherby and Easingwold.

From 1974 to 2023 it was part of the Hambleton District, it is now administered by the unitary North Yorkshire Council.

The Church of England primary school is federated with Snape Community School and had 41 children on the roll in 2007 aged between 4 and 11 years, taught in two mixed-age classes. By 2016 pupil numbers had dropped to 25.

There is also provision for under-5s in the village hall.

The village public house, restaurant and hotel, The Buck Inn overlooks the village green. Specialities include locally brewed real ale, Sunday lunchtime jazz and a large room for conferences and functions.

Just to the north of the village Thornton Watlass Hall is a private home but also provides hotel accommodation. The Hall has been featured over the years in several television dramas, including, as the home of Mrs Pumphrey, All Creatures Great and Small (BBC), Wuthering Heights (ITV) and Heartbeat (ITV), where it has featured as Ashfordly Hall and Websters Hotel.

== See also ==
- Listed buildings in Thornton Watlass
