= Church of St Gregory, Bedale =

Anglican church in North Yorkshire, England

Coordinates: 54°17′27.5″N 1°35′36.8″W

- St Gregory's Church
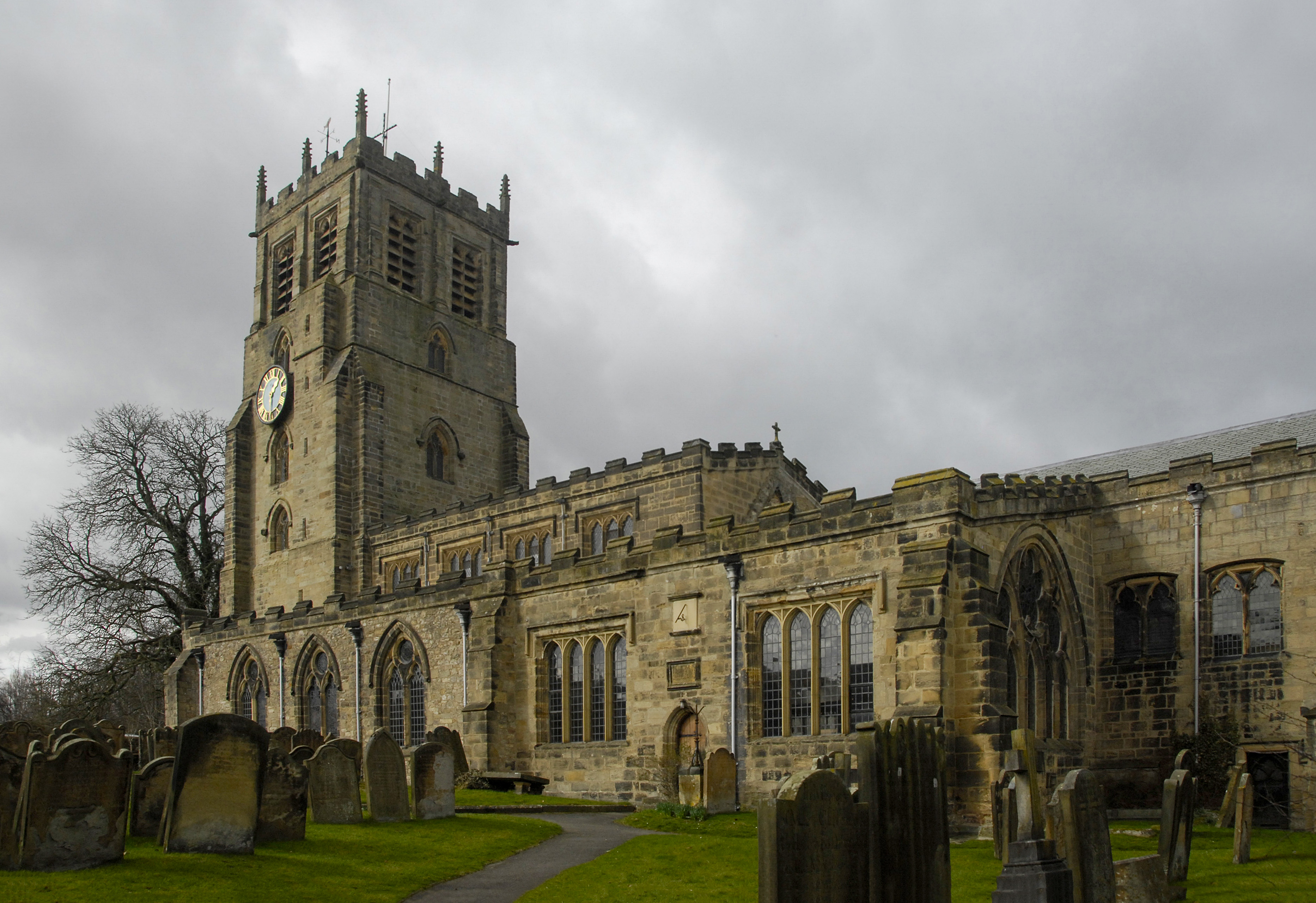
- The Church of St Gregory in Bedale

- Location within North Yorkshire
- OS grid reference: SE265884
- Location: Bedale, North Yorkshire
- Country: England
- Denomination: Church of England
- Website: Official website

History
- Status: Parish church
- Dedication: Pope Gregory I

Architecture
- Functional status: Active
- Architectural type: Early English; Decorated; Perpendicular

Specifications
- Length: 120 feet (37 m) (west to east)
- Width: 61 feet (19 m) (north to south)

Administration
- Diocese: Leeds
- Archdeaconry: Richmond and Craven
- Deanery: Wensley
- Parish: Bedale

Clergy
- Rector: Simon Moor

Listed Building – Grade I
- Designated: 22 August 1966
- Reference no.: 1151205

The Church of St Gregory, Bedale is the parish church for the town of Bedale in North Yorkshire, England. It is the main church of the benefice of Bedale and Leeming and Thornton Watlass. A stone church in Bedale was mentioned in the Domesday Book, but the present structure dates back to the latter part of the 12th century, with further restorations over the last 800 years. The grade I listed building has many notable features including a medieval image of a left handed St George fighting a dragon and the tower, set to the western side, which was built with a portcullis in a defensive capacity.

The church is located at what is known as the 'Top of the Town' which is at the northern end of the high street. The churchyard is set with yew trees and falls away to Bedale Beck to the east. The church features in the book England's Thousand Best Churches by Simon Jenkins.

== History ==
The Domesday Book stated in 1086, that a place of worship existed on the site of where the present church is, which would suggest that the church appears to have escaped the Harrying of the North. McCall stated that the architecture of the previous Anglo-Saxon church (some of which is incorporated into the present building), points to the previous church being constructed in 850. Pre-Norman Conquest stones were found in the crypt of the church, which were detailed with serpents biting their own tails and the image of a serpent with the head of a human taking part in The Temptation. The crypt is underneath the chancel and retains two of the six Anglo-Saxon stones found there in the 19th century. The crypt is believed to have acted as a sacristy at some point before it was turned into a mausoleum. The crypt still retains a stone altar and access is by an external door at the east end of the church, the access directly adjacent the altar in the chancel has been boarded over.

Whilst the present church dates back to the 13th century, additions and restorations were carried out in the 14th, 15th and 19th centuries. The nave and north aisle date to the 12th/13th century whereas the south aisle and south chapel were constructed around 1290. As with many churches of its time, additions and extensions were added at different dates; in the late 12th century the chancel was extended southwards into the south chapel (later the Lady Chapel), with the south aisle and chapel being rebuilt in 1290. As such, the church displays three different types of architecture; Decorated, Early English and Perpendicular. Detailed structural analysis estimates that the original Anglo-Saxon church on the site has been suggested to have been 48 feet (15 m) long, 24 feet (7.3 m) wide and 24 feet (7.3 m) tall. The present church is 120 feet (37 m) long, 61 feet (19 m) wide, with the tower height being 98 feet (30 m) high. It is dedicated to Saint Gregory, but the date of dedication is unknown. It was known as the Church of St Gregory when Brian de Thornhill was rector in the 14th century, but the earliest written confirmation occurs in 1547 when it is specifically mentioned in a will.

The north doorway was blocked up in the 14th century with the accompanying north aisle showing three piers with differing styles; octagonal, quatrefoil and cruciform. The south doorway is also blocked up and has had a sundial affixed on the outside dated 1556.

The 98-foot (30 m) high tower, recognised as being rare in this part of Northern England (due to its portcullis), dates from the 1330s and was built as a defensive structure. To protect the townsfolk from marauding forces, a portcullis was installed at the foot of the tower, and whilst the grooves showing where it would be used are still extant, it was largely forgotten about until it came crashing down in the 19th century due to corrosion. (Note: Clement Hodges notes that the portcullis was said to have come crashing down due to a lightning strike and that it had to be hacked away and was then sold for scrap metal.) The middle floor of the tower contains a fireplace and other domestic features (bedrooms etc) so it is believed to be part of Bedale Castle which is said to have existed immediately to the west of the church. (Note: The castle is surmised to have existed as some historians and writers have alluded to its presence with the foundations being underneath the grounds of Bedale Hall. Some have argued that the castle did not exist and that the building was a hunting lodge.) The uppermost floor of the tower is Perpendicular in nature and is finished with eight pinnacles. Other similar fortified towers were built at churches in Melsonby, Spennithorne and Thornton Watlass at around the same time in history. The clock on the tower was a gift from the Beresford-Peirse family in 1873.

The tower was long believed to have been built by Bryan FitzAlan, but Clement Hodges, writing in The Early History of Bedale states that the architectural style belies this fact as FitzAlan died in 1306, well before the start of Ogival architecture in the 1320s. Clement Hodges states that it was more likely his wife, Mathilda, who completed the tower in the 1330s and who lived until 1340. Much of the building of the church is attributed to Thomas FitzAlan, the son of Bryan, who was a rector at the church in the lat 12th century.

Several wall paintings were uncovered during restoration work in the 1920s. These include The Creed and The Lord's Prayer above the nave and a depiction of St George fighting a dragon in St George's Chapel. The paintings are thought to be over 500 years old and the one of St George has been notified as quite rare as it shows St George being left handed as he is fighting the dragon. It is thought that these images, reflecting the church's ancient Catholic roots, were covered over with whitewash during The Reformation.

The church contains one of the oldest ringable bells in the England; it weighs 26 long cwt (2,900 lb or 1,300 kg) and was installed in 1360. The bell is commonly known as The Jervaulx Bell, as it was brought to the church from Jervaulx Abbey in the middle of the 14th century. The other eight bells in the belfry are from the 17th, 18th and 19th centuries, with the Sanctus bell being cast in 1753.

The east window of the Lady Chapel (the south aisle) is believed to have been transported to St Gregory's from Jervaulx Abbey after the dissolution. Pevsner states his disappointment that all the other windows in the church are Victorian in origin, but notes that the East window is a William Wailes creation. The Clerestory was added in 1400 and allows light into the church through its four windows on either side of the aisle.

St Gregory's is the main church in the benefice of Bedale and Leeming and Thornton Watlass. The benefice was created in 2007 when a lack of clergy prompted a parish merger. Stainless steel roofing was installed in 2016 after lead was stolen from the church roof. Special dispensation had to be awarded by Historic England for the substitution of metals to go ahead and a grant was awarded from the Listed Places of Worship Roof Repair Fund. Simon Jenkins mentions the church in his book England's Thousand Best Churches, describing St Gregory's as being

...a strong church in every sense [with] a fine crypt.... and magnificent headstones.

== Effigies and monuments ==
The tomb of Bryan FitzAlan and his first wife used to be on the south side of the church. This tomb was destroyed at an unknown date and the two effigies of FitzAlan and his wife now rest at the north-western end of the church. An effigy of Brian de Thornhill, the third rector in charge at Gregory's from 1298 lies in the north chapel against the north wall. Glynne noted two more effigies of knights located in the tower and in the aisle of the north chapel, set into the stone floor, is a brass effigy to Thomas Jackson. This includes a Latin inscription and whilst it is faded now, Dodsworth writing in 1622 recorded it as Hic jacet Thomas Jackson quondam mercator de Bedall qui obiit primo die mensis julii anno dñi mccccc xxix. Cujus anime propitietur deus, amen.

The 18th century conjurer, quack and scientific lecturer Gustavus Katterfelto is buried near the altar in the church.

== Listed structures ==
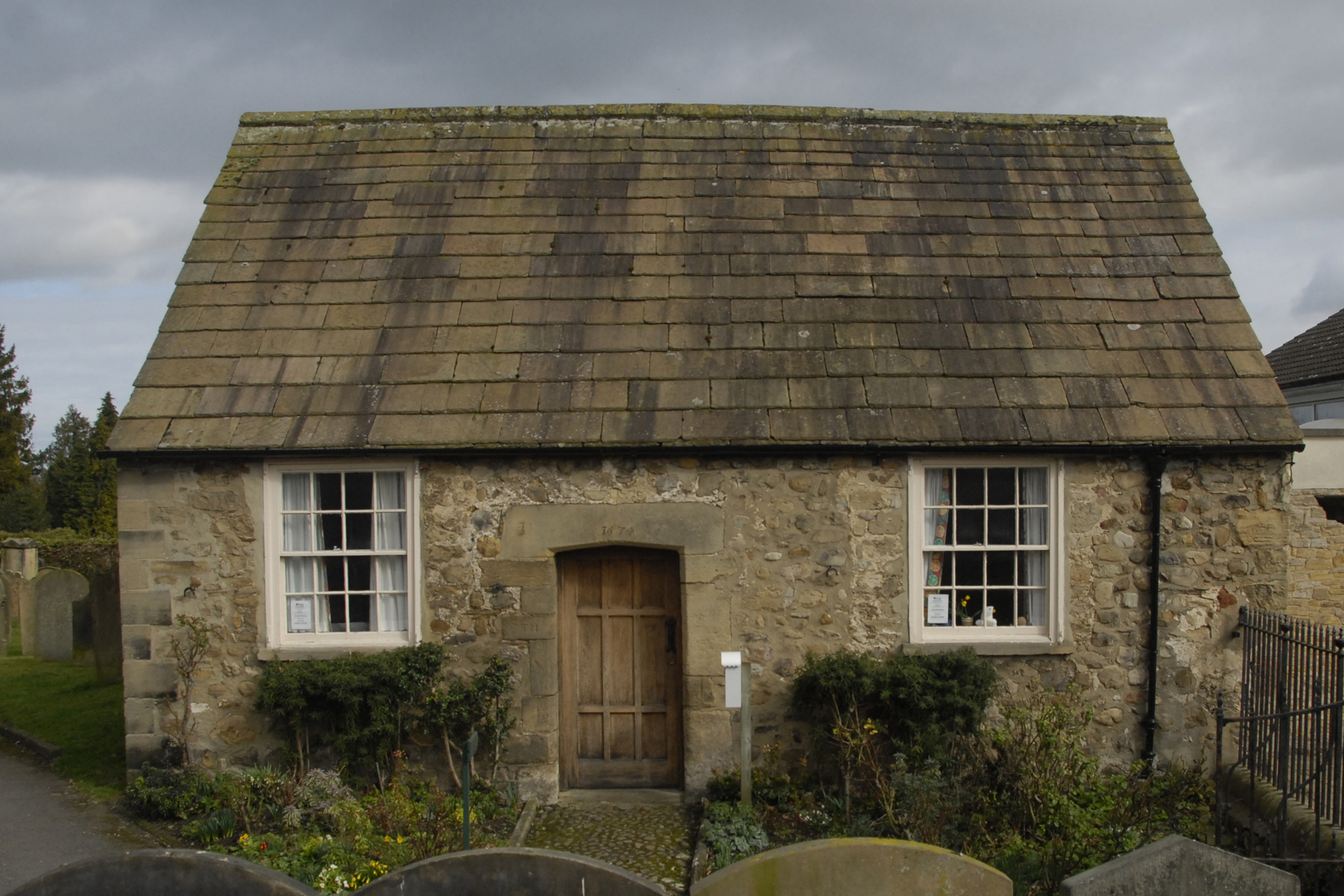
The old Grammar School in the churchyard of St Gregory's Church, Bedale.

Besides the church itself, which is grade I listed, there are a further three structures within the churchyard that are listed with Historic England;

- The Old Grammar School - grade II listed - now acts as the parish office
- The churchyard gates - grade II listed - are at the south entrance that faces down towards the High Street
- The War Memorial - grade II listed - erected in 1920, the memorial now commemorates both the dead from the First and Second World Wars

The vicarage, immediately to the north of the churchyard is listed at grade II status.

== Clergy ==
The following is a list of vicars who have served at St Gregory's. Transcription from the parish register has thrown up many different spellings (Dowsen/Dowson), these as are as given in "The Early History of Bedale" by Clement-Hodges and McCall.

Year	Incumbent	Year	Incumbent	Year	Incumbent	Year	Incumbent
1198	Elias	1480	George Fitzhugh	1657	John Gunter	1899	Windham de la Poer Beresford Peirse
1254	Thomas son of Brian (FitzAlan)	1495	Thomas Magnus	1660	Peter Samwaies	1931	Arthur Rupert Browne Wilkinson
1295	Walter de Langton	1550	Henry Ilkens	1698	Francis Pemberton	1938	Harold Victor Hodson
1298	Brian de Thornhill	1569	John Tyms	1721	Robert Lumley	1951	John Massingberd Mundy
1355	Laurence de Thornhill	1593	Robert Beverly	1731	Edward Place	1965	Frank William Armitage Ledgard
1369	John de Hermesthorp	1618	John Pettie	1775	Henry Dawnay	1988	Malcolm David Emmel
1415	William Grey	1621	John Wilson	1783	Richard Clark	1998	David Graham Paton-Williams
1426	Robert Morton	1634	Henry Wickham	1797	Thomas Monson	2010	Simon Paul Ruckin
1450	Richard Alfreton	1641	William Metcalfe	1843	John Joseph Thomas Monson	2012	Ian Morgan Robinson
1464	Robert Fleming	1653	Ralph Dowson	1861	John George Beresford	2019	Simon Moor

After an interregnum, the Reverend Simon Moor became the vicar of the Benefice at Bedale in June 2019.

== See also ==
- Grade I listed buildings in North Yorkshire (district)
- Listed buildings in Bedale

== Gallery ==
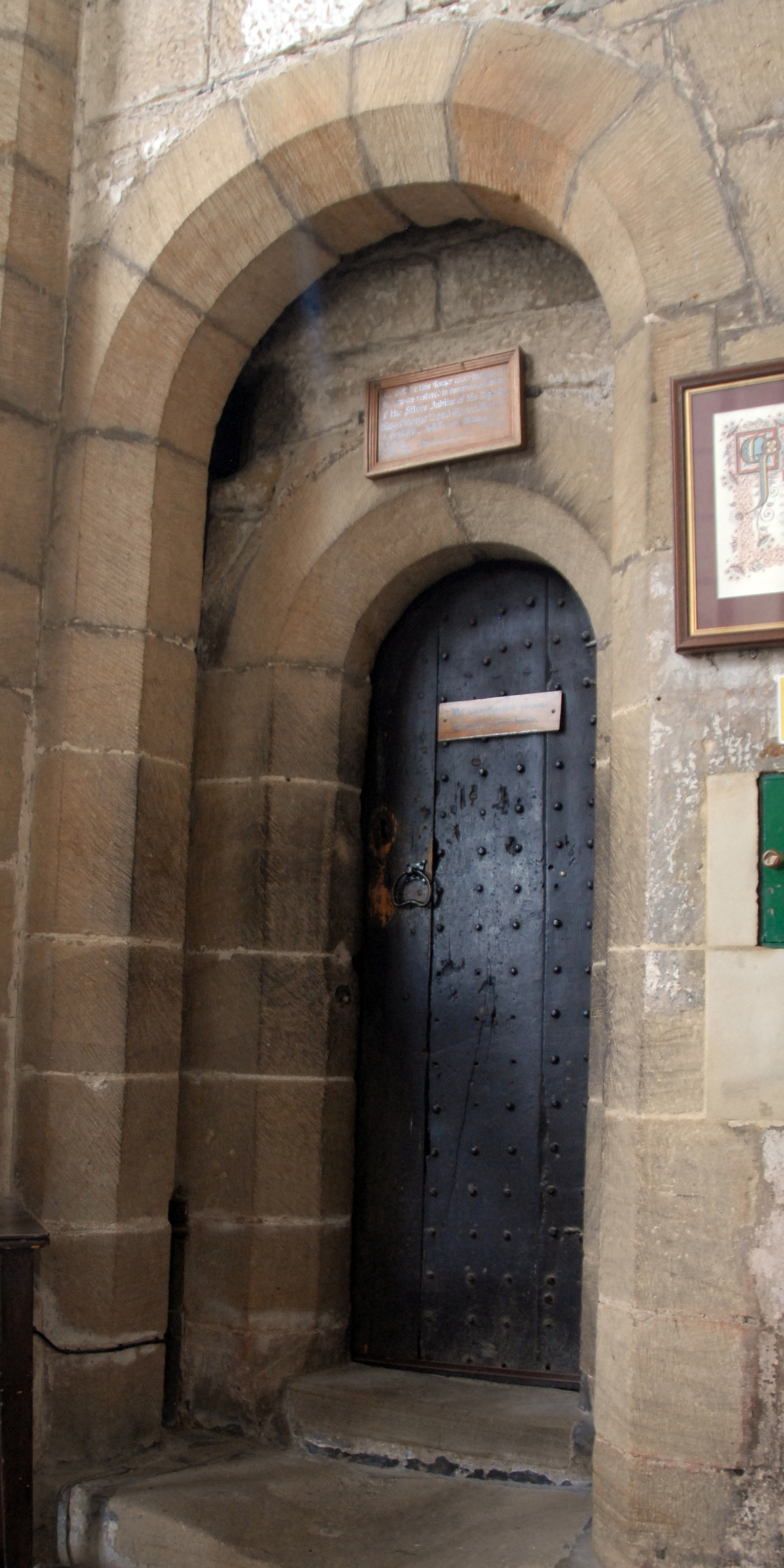
Interior door to the tower. The space between the two arches used to hold a portcullis for defensive purposes

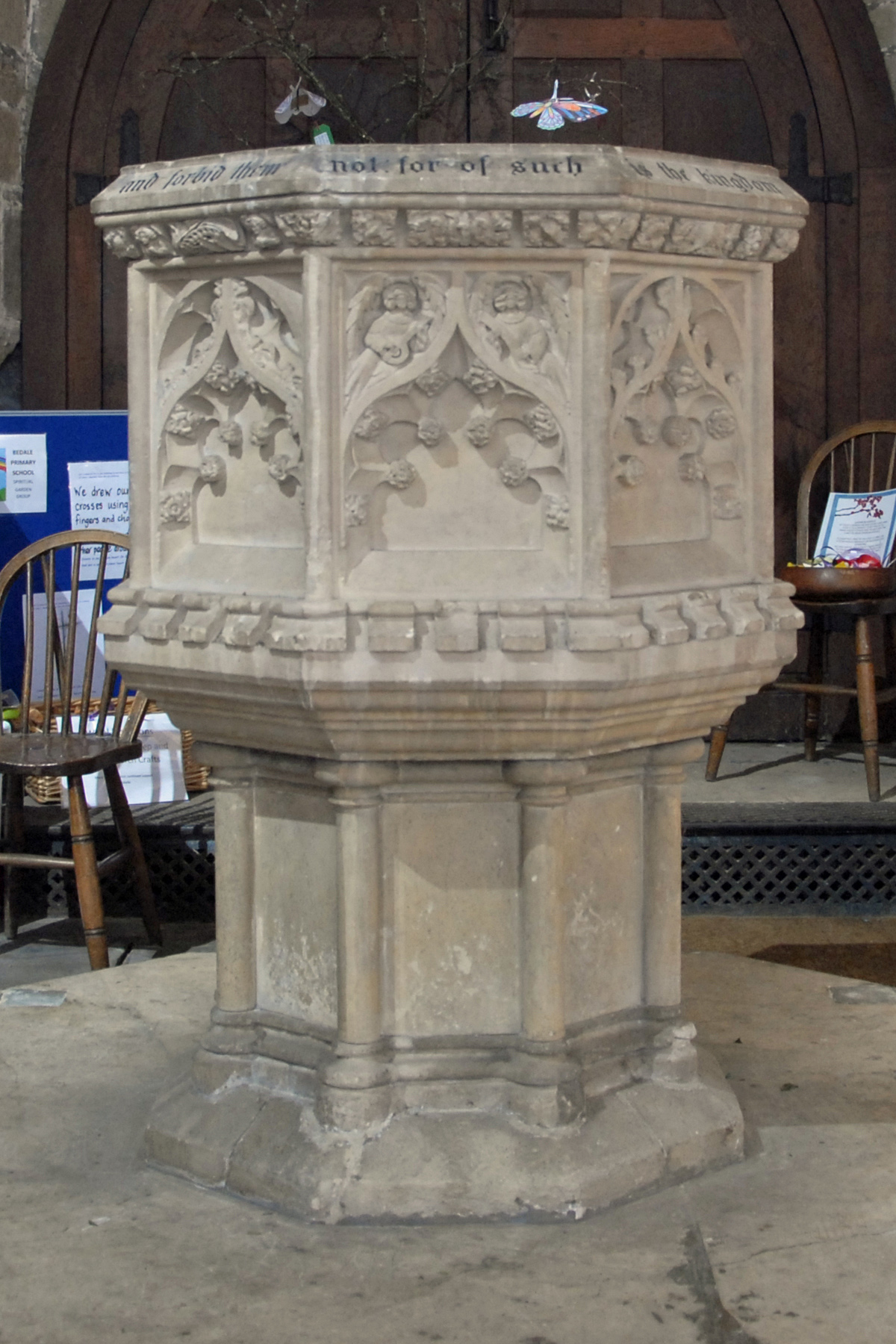
The font

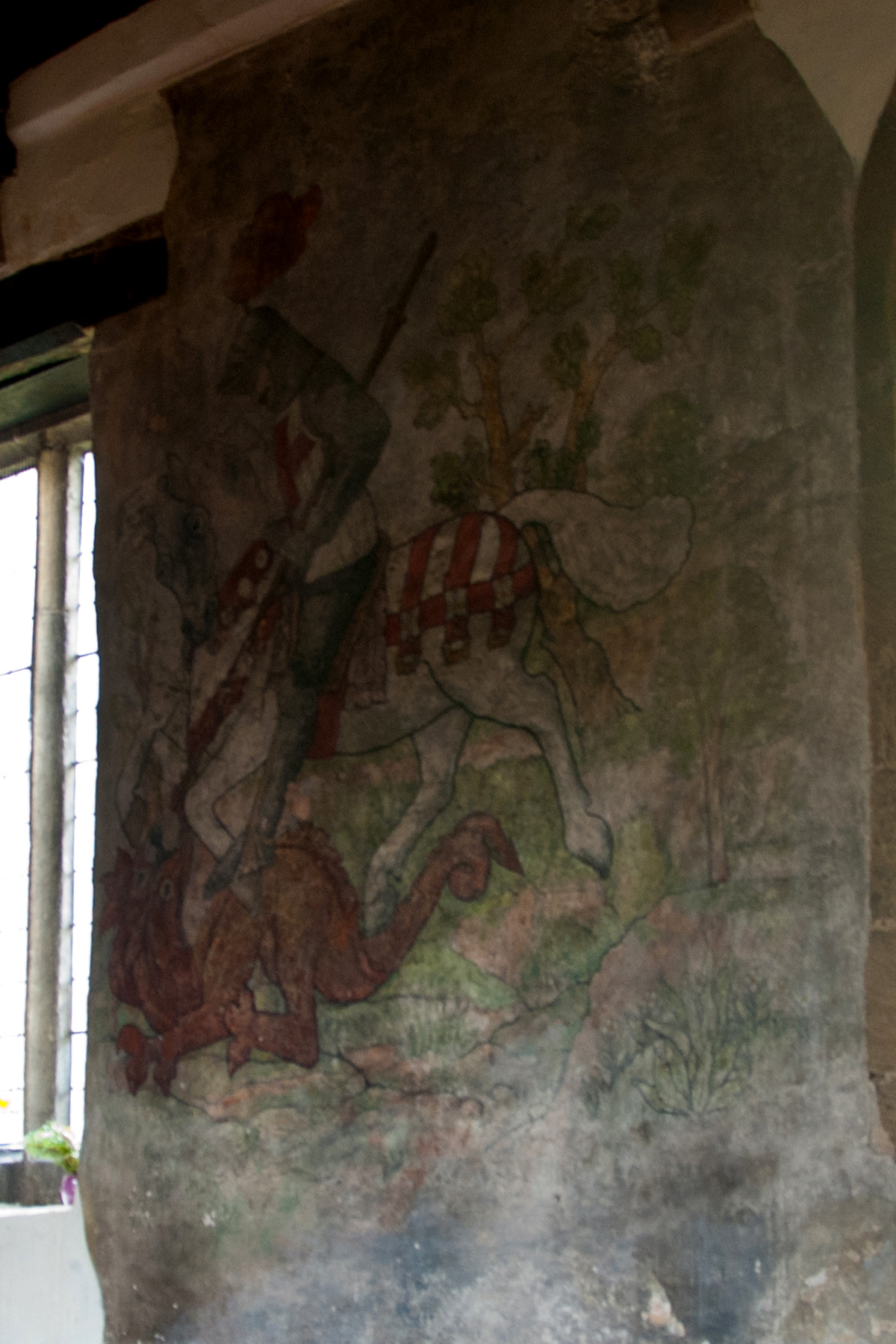
St George and the dragon

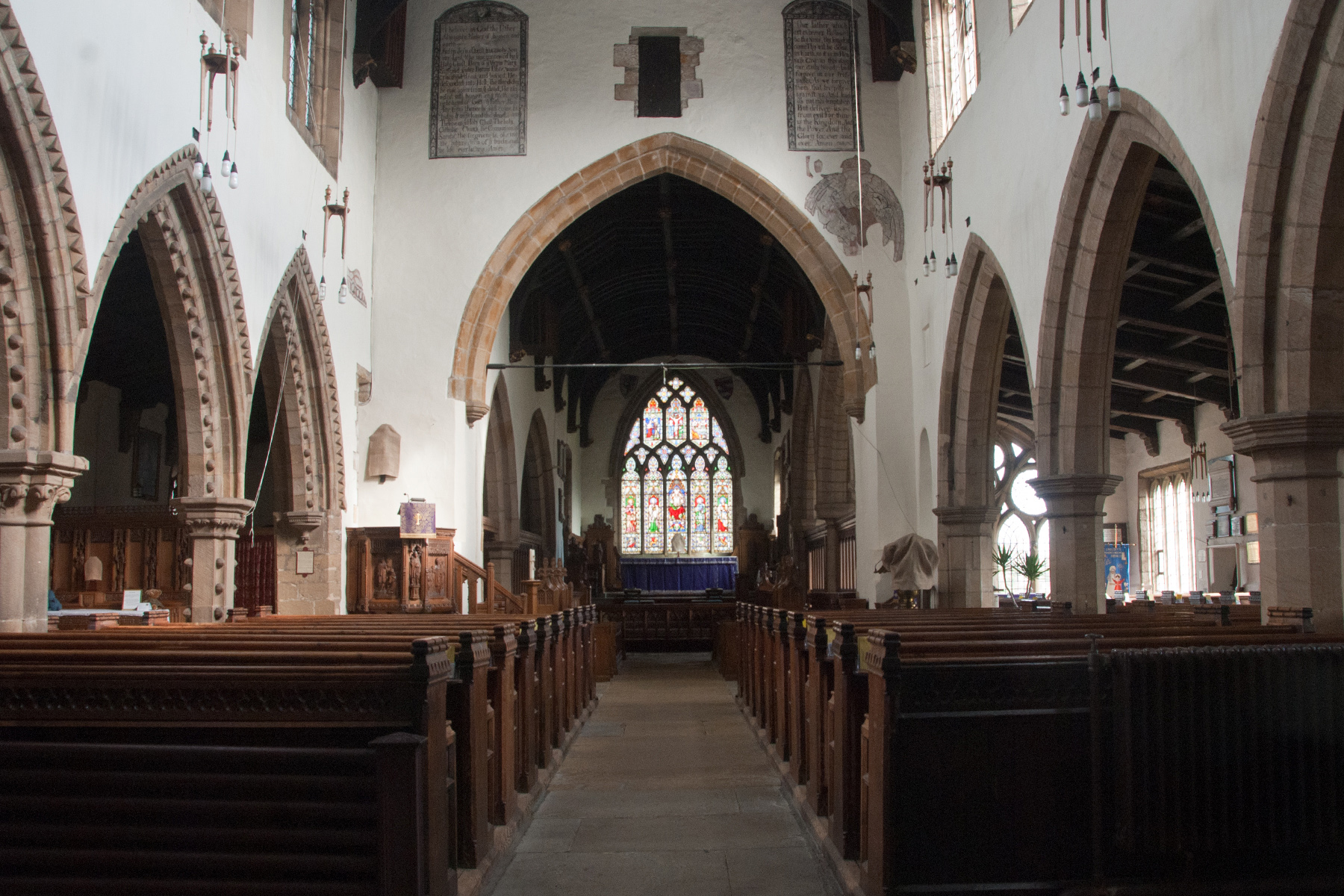
Interior view looking east

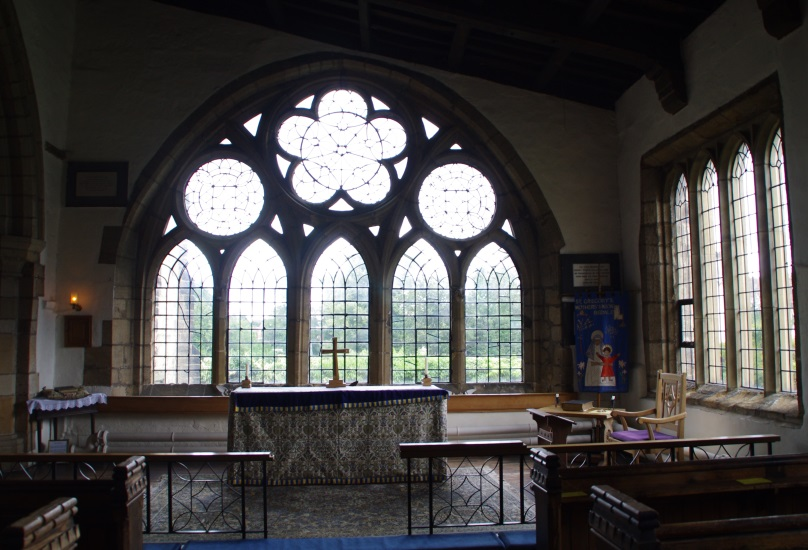
Stained Glass in the Lady Chapel
