= Bedale Hall =

Grade I listed Palladian-style country house in Bedale, North Yorkshire, England

Coordinates: 54.2903°N 1.5941°W

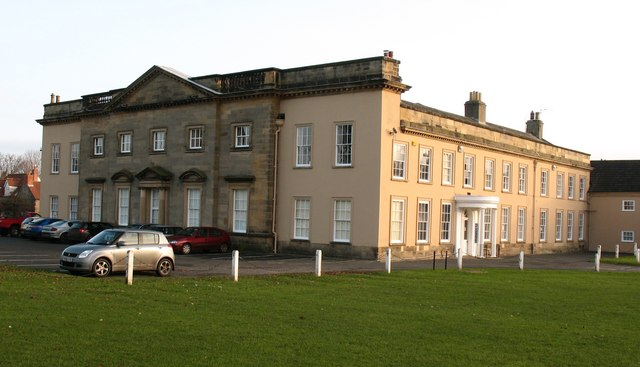
Bedale Hall

Bedale Hall is a Grade I listed Palladian-style country house in the town of Bedale, North Yorkshire, England.

It is a large two-storey house constructed of brick and ashlar with a stone slate roof. It is in parkland at the north end of Bedale, off the Leyburn road.

== History ==
The estate in which Bedale Hall sits was purchased in 1638 by John Peirse from the family of Sir Richard Theakston. A manor house, later incorporated into the present building, was built around the 17th century on the site.

Expansion of the building to create the current Palladian mansion was commenced in 1730 by Henry Peirse, primarily by infilling between the wings of the existing house. The hall then remained unchanged until about 1760, when a new wing was added to house a racing stud, together with gallops on nearby land. In 1777 the hall was again expanded by incorporating a nearby house into the structure.

In the early 19th century the estate was inherited by Henry William De La Poer Beresford from an aunt, after which he appended the surname of Peirse to his own. His son, Henry Monson De La Poer Beresford-Peirse (1850–1926) succeeded his uncle as third baronet Beresford-Peirse in February 1873. The family occupied the hall until after the First World War, when it was leased to tenants before being requisitioned for military use during the Second World War. After being handed back in 1948 the hall stood empty for a while and was invaded by a dozen squatter families who caused a considerable amount of damage to the fabric.

In 1951 the building was purchased for 4,000 pounds by Bedale Rural District Council, who demolished the stable wing as unsafe and made the main building fit for use as offices, which were occupied in 1952. The surrounding land was made into a public park. The Council then undertook a programme of improvement, the objective of which was the complete restoration of the Staircase Hall, Corridor and Saloon, (now called the Ballroom) with the help of a large grant from the Historic Buildings Council. The work was completed in 1961 and every detail of the Ballroom, except for the heaters and emergency exits, is now as it was originally completed in 1730. As well as providing office space the building was used for various community activities, which continued after it was taken over by the new Hambledon council in 1974.

The hall is now operated as a charitable trust.

== Community use ==
The hall is host to several community organizations, in various parts of the building, including:

- Bedale Library
- Bedale Museum
- Bedale and Villages children's centre
- Bedale Town Council and Aiskew Parish Council
- Tourist Information Centre

There are also offices to rent to private commercial tenants.

The hall can be rented for weddings and private occasions, and there are facilities available for meetings and conferences.

== See also ==
- Grade I listed buildings in North Yorkshire (district)
- Listed buildings in Bedale
