= Gerald Willoughby-Meade =

British author (1875–1958)

Gerald Willoughby-Meade (25 September 1875 – 24 June 1958) was a British author who wrote on the subject of the supernatural in Chinese folklore.

He was a member of the Royal Asiatic Society and a member of council of the China Society in London.

He was a friend of Lionel Giles to whom he dedicated his book Chinese Ghouls and Goblins.

His publications include:

- The Grotesque in Chinese Art (1918, London)
  - which was presented as a paper and read before the China Society.
- Ghost and Vampire Tales of China (1925, London)
  - which was presented as a paper and read before the China Society, 28 May 1925.
- Chinese Ghouls and Goblins (1928, London)
  - which was cited extensively in Montague Summers' book The Vampire, His Kith and Kin (1928, London)
  - which had two stories, The Celestial Stag and Saved by the Book, reprinted in the anthology The Book of Fantasy (originally published in 1940 as Antologia de la literatura fantastica, Argentina) edited by Jorge Luis Borges, Adolfo Bioy Casares and Silvina Ocampo.

Willoughby-Meade learned to read and write Chinese at the School of Oriental Studies (as a part-time hobby). He also learned from Chinese friends he met and knew at the China Society. He also had "conversational" French and Spanish, and on retirement studied Greek.

Despite his interest in Asian studies, he never visited China or Japan. All his information was gained from study reading, especially from the libraries of the School of Oriental Studies, British Museum and the Victoria and Albert Museum.

During the First World War he was (due to age) a Reserve in the Artist's Rifles; reporting for weekend camps in Essex; keeping uniform and rifle at home.

Professionally he was an actuary, working in the City of London for a major insurance group on the statistical side of life assurance.
