= Anna Dodsworth =

British Romantic poet (c. 1740–1801)

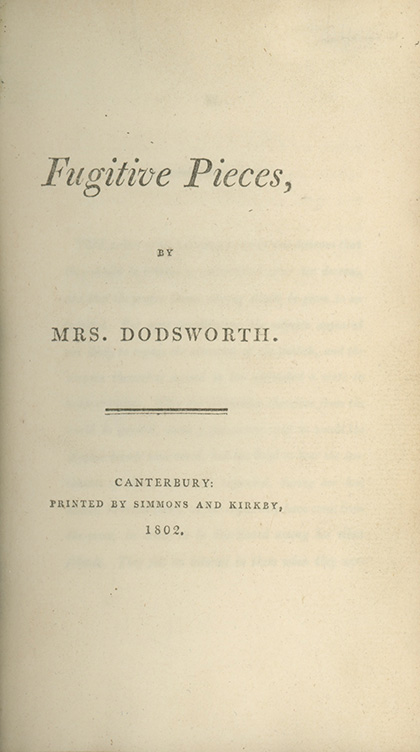
- Title page of Fugitive Pieces. By Mrs. [Anna] Dodsworth. Canterbury: Simmons & Kirkby, 1802.
- Born: Anna Barrell c. 1740
- Died: 1801
- Occupation: Writer
- Spouse: Frank Dodsworth
- Writing career
- Language: English
- Period: Romantic
- Notable work: Fugitive Pieces (1802)

Anna Dodsworth (née Barrell; c. 1740–1801) was a British Romantic poet who has enjoyed increased attention in the twentieth and twenty-first centuries.

== Life ==
Anna Barrell's mother died when she was young and she was educated by her father, Francis Barrell. She began writing when she was seventeen, when she wrote an elegy to her brother. Shortly thereafter she married Frank Dodsworth, vicar, of Dodington Kent. The marriage lasted forty-three years, until her death in 1801. There is no record of any children.

Dodsworth produced "both occasional poems for her friends and family and wry social commentary in rhymed metrical verse." Her only published collection, Fugitive Pieces, was edited and printed posthumously by her husband "in a very limited number" for private distribution. According to the unsigned preface,

THE writer of the following PIECES was desirous that they should be printed by subscription after her decease, and that the profits thence arising should be given to an hospital. But upon examination, the subjects appeared not likely to engage the attention of the public, and the POEMS themselves seemed in too unfinished a state to brave criticism. They are withholden therefore from the world in general, under a persuasion that so would the Author herself have acted, had she lived to hear the sentiments of those, whom she requested, during her last illness, to revise them. A few copies only have come from the press, in order to be distributed among her select friends. They felt an interest in them when they were written, and will not, it is hoped, peruse them with indifference now. To these, the friends of former happy days, friends, who long knew the deceased, and knowing, loved her, the Editor presents a memorial of one, to whose virtues he was indebted for three and forty years of uninterrupted felicity.

Dodsworth's poems have since been anthologized in Women romantic poets: 1785-1832 (1992), British women poets of the 19th century (1996), and British Satire, 1785-1840 (2003).

== Works ==
- Fugitive Pieces. By Mrs. Dodsworth. Canterbury: Simmons & Kirkby. 1802.

== Etexts ==
- Fugitive Pieces. By Mrs. Dodsworth. Canterbury: Simmons & Kirkby. 1802. (Google Books)
- "To Matthew Dodsworth, Esq., On a Noble Captain Declaring that His Finger Was Broken by a Gate" (Poetry Foundation)
