= Chinese Ghouls and Goblins =

1928 book by Gerald Willoughby-Meade

Chinese Ghouls and Goblins is a book on the supernatural in Chinese folklore written by British author Gerald Willoughby-Meade and published in London in 1928.

The book is 431 pages long and divided into 15 chapters. A notable chapter of the book is devoted to Chinese Vampires referred to as Ch'iang Shih, and it was extensively cited by Montague Summers in his book The Vampire, His Kith and Kin (1928, London). The book was also cited by a number of other works, such as Chinese Lineage and Society and Rats, Cats, Rogues, and Heroes: Glimpses of China's Hidden Past.
