= Thornton Watlass Hall =

Country House in North Yorkshire, England

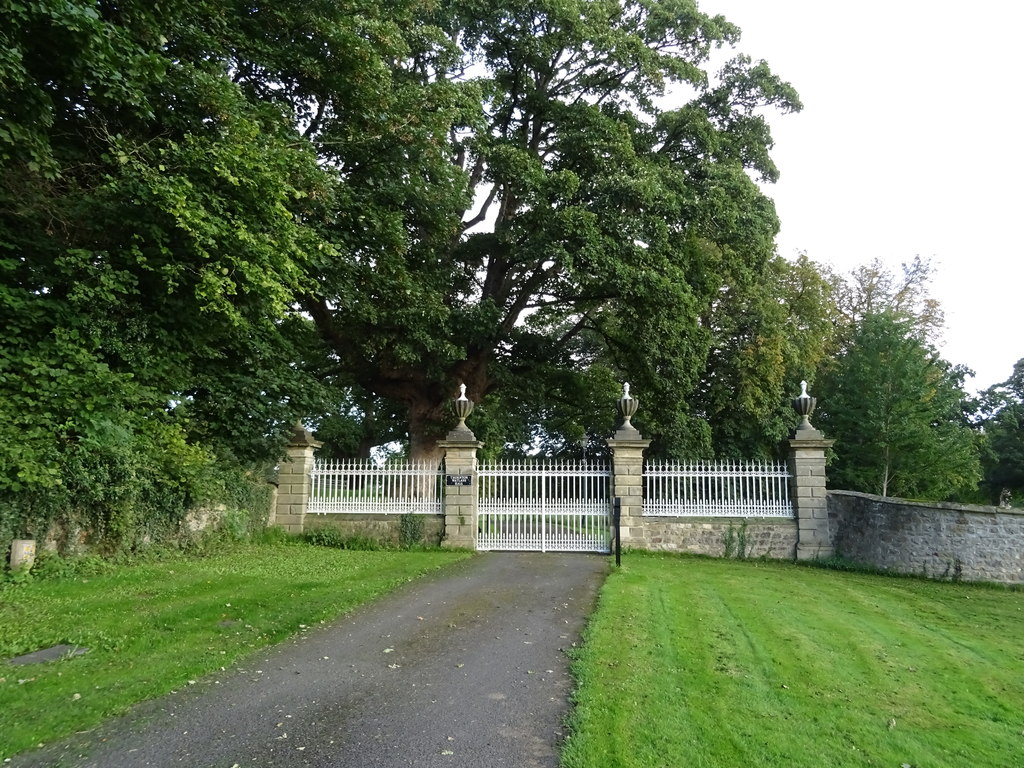
- The gated entrance and driveway leading to Thornton Watlass Hall
- Interactive map of the Thornton Watlass Hall area

General information
- Type: Country house / Manor house
- Architectural style: Georgian and Queen Anne
- Location: Thornton Watlass, England
- Coordinates: 54.2678°N 1.6212°W
- Completed: Mid-18th century (incorporating late 17th-century core)
- Client: Dodsworth family
- Owner: Smith-Dodsworth family

Technical details
- Material: Red brick and ashlar stone dressings

Listed Building – Grade II*
- Designated: 22 August 1966
- Reference no.: 1190159

Thornton Watlass Hall is an 18th-century country house and Grade II* listed building situated in the village of Thornton Watlass, near Bedale in North Yorkshire, England. The hall has served as the ancestral seat of the Dodsworth family (later the Smith-Dodsworth baronets) since the late 16th century.

Surrounded by landscaped parkland overlooking the village green, the present hall is an imposing brick structure with fine ashlar dressings, combining elements of late 17th-century design with mid-18th-century Georgian additions.

== History ==
=== Early manor and the Dodsworth family ===
The manor of Thornton Watlass was held following the Norman Conquest by the Nevill family and subsequently passed to the Scrope family of Bolton Castle. In 1557, the manor was purchased by John Dodsworth of Settrington, establishing the long-standing association between the family and the estate.

During the English Civil War, the family maintained a prominent royalist presence in Richmondshire. Sir Edward Dodsworth expanded the landed estate in the late 17th century, laying the foundations for the current house on the site of an earlier medieval manor house.

=== The Smith-Dodsworth Baronets ===
In 1821, Sir Edward Smith, 2nd Baronet of Newland Park, assumed the additional surname of Dodsworth following his marriage to Susan Dodsworth, co-heiress of John Dodsworth of Thornton Watlass. The Smith-Dodsworth baronetcies united the Newland and Thornton Watlass estates, making Thornton Watlass Hall the principal seat of the family.

In the 19th and early 20th centuries, the estate was renowned for hosting sporting events, traditional shoots, and country garden fetes. Sir Matthew Smith-Dodsworth, 6th Baronet (1852–1931), served as a Justice of the Peace and High Sheriff of Yorkshire in 1902.

=== Modern period ===
During the Second World War, portions of the hall and surrounding parkland were requisitioned for military training and domestic support services. Following the war, the family restored the house and grounds. The hall remains a private residence owned and maintained by the Smith-Dodsworth family, hosting country sports, corporate events, and wedding receptions.

== Architecture ==
Thornton Watlass Hall exhibits a two-storey frontage built primarily of dark red brick laid in Flemish bond, with sandstone ashlar quoins, plinths, string courses, and a deep molded cornice topped by a stone parapet.

=== Main Façade ===
The West Front (Principal Elevation) features a symmetrical seven-bay front. The central three bays project slightly forward beneath a triangular pediment containing a carved relief of the family coat of arms. The Entrance has a central doorway and is approached by low stone steps and framed by a fine Gibbs surround with a heavy keystone and pediment above. The windows consist of tall 12-pane sash windows in molded stone surrounds with projecting sills.

=== Interior ===
The interior retains a range of 18th-century fixtures and decorative features. The entrance hall features full-height early Georgian oak panelling, a stone flagged floor, and a carved marble fireplace with a relief mantelpiece. There is also a three-flight oak staircase dating from c. 1730 features turned balusters, a molded handrail, and carved bracket ends. And the drawing room and dining room are decorated with delicate mid-18th-century plasterwork ceilings, gilded cornices, and family portraits spanning five centuries.

== Grounds and estate ==
The hall sits within a Grade II registered historic parkland spanning approximately 40 hectares. The grounds feature mature lime and beech avenues, an 18th-century walled kitchen garden, and a former coach house and stable block arranged around a central cobbled courtyard.

== In popular culture ==
Thornton Watlass Hall and its surrounding estate have served as a filming location for several television, film, and documentary productions, drawing on its intact 18th-century architecture and rural North Yorkshire backdrop.

- All Creatures Great and Small (BBC): The hall featured prominently as **Waterhouse Hall**, the grand country home of the eccentric retired officer Major Randolph Seaton (played by Iain Cuthbertson). Both the tree-lined driveway, front entrance, and ground-floor reception rooms were used across multiple episodes in the original series run.
- Heartbeat (ITV): The hall's exterior, cobbled stable yard, and parkland were utilized as a period backdrop for various estate grounds and manor house scenes in the long-running 1960s-set police drama.
- The Beiderbecke Connection (ITV / Yorkshire Television): Portions of the hall and surrounding country roads featured in location shoots for the popular 1988 comedy-drama series written by Alan Plater.
- Heritage and Countryside Documentaries: The estate's cricket pitch, walled garden, and parkland have featured in various regional culture and countryside programmes, including BBC's Countryfile and regional features highlighting historic family estates in Richmondshire.

== See also ==
- Grade II* listed buildings in North Yorkshire
- Smith-Dodsworth baronets
