= Pilar de Lusarreta =

Argentine author and critic

Pilar de Lusarreta (1914–1967) was an Argentine author and critic. She coauthored several works with Arturo Cancela. She published Cinco dandys porteños in 1943.
