= Santiago Dabove =

Argentine author

Santiago Dabove (1889–1951) was an Argentine writer. He was born in Morón, Buenos Aires where he resided his entire life and mostly lived in solitude.

His story "Being Dust" appears in the collection The Book of Fantasy.
