= Niu Lizhi =

Chinese surgeon

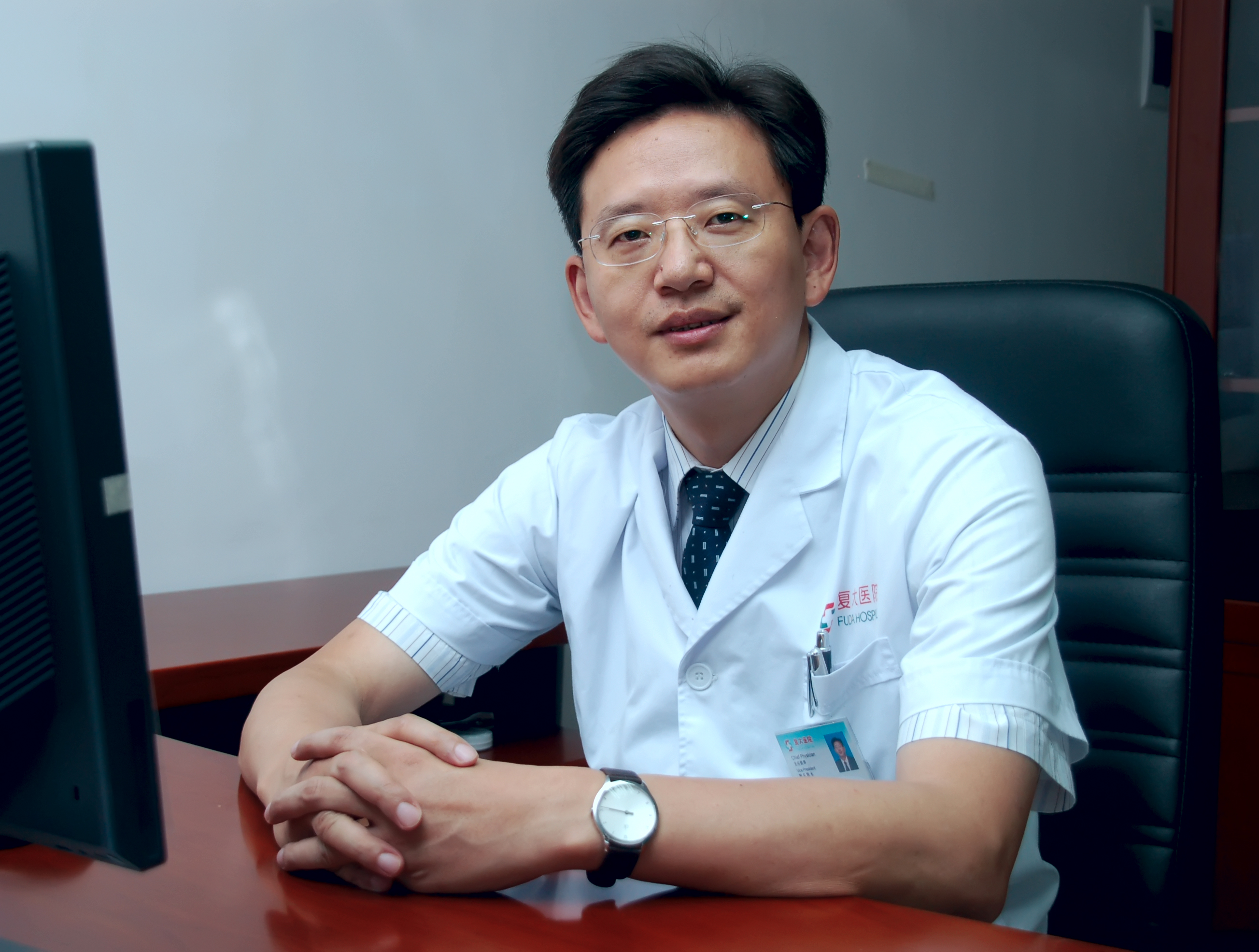
- Niu in 2009
- Born: 1966 (age 59–60)
- Education: Fourth Military Medical University
- Occupation: Surgeon
- Medical career
- Field: Cryosurgery

Niu Lizhi (born 1966) is a Chinese surgeon who specializes in minimally invasive cryosurgery for cancers. In 1996, he graduated from the Fourth Military Medical University with a doctoral degree in Thoracic & Cardiac Surgery.

Lizhi is the president of Guangzhou Fuda Cancer Hospital and vice president of the International Society of Cryosurgery. He is the supervisor of the master's degree course in Jinan University. He focuses on the treatment of pancreatic cancer, liver cancer, lung cancer, renal cancer, thyroid cancer, peritoneal cancer and other solid tumors. Niu Lizhi and his team have performed nearly ten thousand cases of cryosurgery.

Lizhi's patients aged from four-year-old child to 94-year-old senior, ranking from Minister, celebrities, to ordinary people and patients with rare diseases like Huang Chuncai, or Gurli.

== Social position ==
Vice President, International Society of Cryosurgery, (ISC)

Vice President, Asian Society of Cryosurgery

== Books (edited and written) ==
- Cryosurgery for Cancer. Shanghai science and technology education publishing, Shanghai 2007. (in Chinese)
- Modern Cryosurgery for Cancer, World Scientific Publishing, Singapore 2012
- New Technique of Cancer Ablation Irreversible Electroporation, Shanghai Science and Technology Lecture Publishing, Shanghai, 2014 (in Chinese)
