= Niu Chiao =

Chinese writer and poet

Niu Chiao was an obscure Chinese writer and poet of the 9th century CE. Reputedly, he wrote more than 30 books all inspirated in fantasy or mistery.

Some of his writings are collected in "Ling Kuai Lu" (about A.D. 879).

Chiao's short story "The Story of the Foxes", also known as Wang-sen and his fox brother, appears on the anthology book The Book of Fantasy.
