= Roger Dodsworth (hoax) =

Widespread hoax in Europe (1826)

Roger Dodsworth was the focus of a widespread hoax in 1826, in which he was claimed to be a man who had fallen into a coma in the Alps in the late seventeenth century and thawed out to return to life in 1826. It is now best known for the short story of the same name by Mary Shelley, published posthumously in 1863, drawn from the story.

== Hoax ==
A French newspaper story, published on 28 June 1826, reported "a most extraordinary event": a man, around thirty years old, had been discovered buried under a pile of ice in the Alps. On pulling the body out and bathing it in warm water, the man woke up, and declared himself to be Roger Dodsworth, son of the antiquarian Roger Dodsworth, born in 1629 and buried under an avalanche in 1660. The story appeared in translation in a London paper a week later, and from there was widely picked up by the British press.

The story circulated through various newspapers, gaining embellishments on the way, with The Scotsman suggesting bathing in milk as an antidote to century-old stiff joints, and John Bull reporting that Dodsworth himself had arrived in London. In mid-July, the story gained a satirical dimension, with a poem by Thomas Moore published in The Times characterising the long-dead Dodsworth as a perfect Tory, "a good obsolete man, who never of Locke or Voltaire has been a reader". In The Sun, William Cobbett contributed a spurious story of a man who had fallen into a coma in a frozen pond in Westmoreland for three hours.

In September, by which time the story was widely understood to be a hoax, a series of letters were published in John Bull claiming to be from Dodsworth, written in a deliberately archaic style. Other letters included a "correction" in the New Monthly Magazine. The third and final letter was published in November, at which point the hoax disappeared from the press.

== Short story ==
During the widespread interest in Dodsworth in September, Mary Shelley had written a letter which she submitted to the New Monthly Magazine; in it, she arranged the story so that he returned to Switzerland to die. The article was probably written in a hurry in order to capitalise on the story; Shelley was known to have submitted a number of other pieces to the magazine, though only one has been definitely identified. In the event, however, it was not published, though it is not clear why one was chosen over the other; as the two contradict each other, they could not both have been used. The story was later resurrected after Shelley's death, and published in 1863 with a preface by the editor explaining that "I did not use it for the purpose originally intended...".

Shelley had considered the idea of a reawakened historical figure as the basis for a tragic story some years earlier, with the unfinished Valerius, about a citizen of the Roman Republic awakened in the nineteenth century. Her father had likewise drawn on the legend of the Seven Sleepers in Mandeville. In the letter, however, she took the idea as a basis for humour rather than tragedy. She later returned to the idea in "The Mortal Immortal," a story about a man who had become immortal by accident and wished to die.

== See also ==
- Great Moon Hoax
- Roger Dodsworth – English antiquary (1585–1654)
