= Arturo Cancela =

Argentine novelist and critic

Arturo Cancela (1882–1957) was an Argentine novelist and critic. He coauthored several works with Pilar de Lusarreta.

== Life ==
The focus of Cancela's literary work was humorous and satirical prose. His most successful launch was the collection of short stories Tres relatos porteños ("El cocobacilo de Herrlin", "Una semana de holgorio" –based on the Tragic Week– and "El culto de los héroes"), in which he describes life in Buenos Aires. He frequently collaborated with Pilar de Lusarreta, his wife. He also authored a number of plays.

== Bibliography ==
- Tres relatos porteños
- Film porteño (El diario de Nasute Pedernera)
- Historia funambulesca del profesor Landormy
- Palabras socráticas a los estudiantes
- Cristina o La gracia de Dios
- El amor a los sesenta
- Alondra
- El secreto de la herradura
