= Matthew Dodsworth =

Matthew Dodsworth (c.1544 – 1631) was, sometime before 1593, appointed as Judge of the Admiralty Court in England's Northern Counties and was later Registrar and Chancellor for Tobias Matthew, Archbishop of York. He was also the father of the noted Yorkshire antiquary, Roger Dodsworth.

Matthew was the second son of Simon Dodsworth of Settrington, East Riding of Yorkshire (now in North Yorkshire), by his spouse Agnes née Harrison.

He entered St John's College, Cambridge and matriculated pensioner at Easter 1565. He gained his LL.B from Trinity Hall, Cambridge in 1573.

He married September 15, 1578, in Oswaldkirk, Yorkshire, Eleanor, daughter of Ralph Sandwith, Esq., of Newton Grange, Oswaldkirk, by his spouse Mary née Segrave.

They had a total of 15 children, baptised in Oswaldkirk, Yorkshire, St Michael le Belfry, York, and Holy Trinity Church, Goodramgate, York between October 1579 and August 1603. Roger Dodsworth, baptised April 24, 1585 in St Oswald, Oswaldkirk, was their fourth child and first son.

Eleanor, wife of Matthew, was buried at Saxton-in-Elmet, Yorkshire, April 26, 1613. Matthew died before October 8, 1631, in Slingsby, North Yorkshire when his Will was administered at York.
