= Roger Dodsworth =

English antiquary

Roger Dodsworth (1585–1654) was an English antiquary.

== Life ==
He was born at Newton Grange, Oswaldkirk, near Helmsley, Yorkshire, in the house of his maternal grandfather, Ralph Sandwith. He devoted himself early to antiquarian research, in which he was greatly assisted by the fact that his father, Matthew Dodsworth, was registrar of York Minster, and could give him access to the records preserved there. He married Holcroft Hesketh, the widow of Laurence Rawsthorne of Hutton Grange, Penwortham, Lancashire where he subsequently resided until his death in August 1654.

== Works ==
At various times in his life he was able to study the records in the library of Sir Robert Cotton, in Skipton Castle and in the Tower of London. He collected a vast store of materials for a history of Yorkshire, a Monasticon Anglicanum, and an English baronage. The second of these was published with considerable additions by Sir William Dugdale (2 vols., 1655 and 1661).

The manuscripts were left to Thomas Fairfax, 3rd Lord Fairfax of Cameron, who by his will bequeathed them (160 volumes in all) to the Bodleian Library at Oxford. Portions have been printed by the Yorkshire Archaeological Society (Dodsworth's Yorkshire Notes, 1884) and the Chetham Society (copies of Lancashire inquisitions post mortem, 1875–1876).

Dodsworth was aided in his study of early Yorkshire by Thomas Levett, a native of High Melton, Yorkshire and High Sheriff of Rutland, who came into possession of the Chartulary of St. John of Pontefract, a collection of early Yorkshire documents kept by monks at the Cluniac abbey. In 1626–27 Levett gave the documents to Dodsworth. How Levett came to possess them is unknown, but the Levetts had been prominent in Yorkshire for centuries, and had once controlled Roche Abbey.
