= HD postcode area =

Postcode area within the United Kingdom

Huddersfield
- Postcode area
- Coordinates: 53.634°N 1.782°W
- Country: United Kingdom
- Postcode area: HD
- Postcode area name: Huddersfield
- Post towns: 3
- Postcode districts: 9
- Postcode sectors: 42
- Postcodes (live): 7,092
- Postcodes (total): 10,702
- Statistics as at May 2020

The HD postcode area, also known as the Huddersfield postcode area, is a group of nine postcode districts in England, within three post towns. These cover southern West Yorkshire, including Huddersfield and Holmfirth in the Metropolitan Borough of Kirklees, and Brighouse in the Metropolitan Borough of Calderdale.

Mail for the HD postcode area is processed at Leeds Mail Centre, along with mail for the BD, HG, HX, LS, WF and YO postcode areas.

== Coverage ==
The approximate coverage of the postcode districts:

Postcode district	Post town	Coverage	Local authority area(s)
HD1	HUDDERSFIELD	Huddersfield Town Centre, Hillhouse, Lockwood, Marsh, Paddock, Thornton Lodge.	Kirklees
HD2	HUDDERSFIELD	Ainley Top, Birkby, Brackenhall, Bradley, Deighton, Fartown, Fixby, Sheepridge.	Kirklees
HD3	HUDDERSFIELD	Ainley Top, Birchencliffe, Lindley, Longwood, Marsh, Milnsbridge, Oakes, Outlane, Quarmby, Paddock, Salendine Nook, Scammonden, .	Kirklees, Calderdale
HD4	HUDDERSFIELD	Berry Brow, Cowlersley, Crosland Moor, Farnley Tyas, Netherton, Newsome, Lowerhouses, Stocksmoor, Thurstonland.	Kirklees
HD5	HUDDERSFIELD	Almondbury, Dalton, Kirkheaton, Moldgreen, Rawthorpe, Waterloo.	Kirklees
HD6	BRIGHOUSE	Bailiff Bridge, Brighouse, Clifton, Rastrick, .	Calderdale
HD7	HUDDERSFIELD	Golcar, Linthwaite, Marsden, Scapegoat Hill, Slaithwaite.	Kirklees
HD8	HUDDERSFIELD	Birdsedge, Clayton West, Denby Dale, Emley, Fenay Bridge, (Note: includes HD8 0AA), Highburton, Holmbridge, Kirkburton, Lepton, Lower Cumberworth, Scissett, Shelley, Shepley, Skelmanthorpe, Upper Cumberworth.	Kirklees
HD9	HOLMFIRTH	Brockholes, Hepworth, Holme, Holmfirth, Honley, Meltham, Netherthong, New Mill, Scholes, Upperthong, Wooldale.	Kirklees

== Map ==
HD postcode area map, showing postcode districts in red and post towns in grey text, with links to nearby BD, HX, OL, S, SK and WF postcode areas.

== See also ==
- Postcode Address File
- List of postcode areas in the United Kingdom
