= Shepley =

Village in West Yorkshire, England

Coordinates: 53.58354°N 1.71146°W

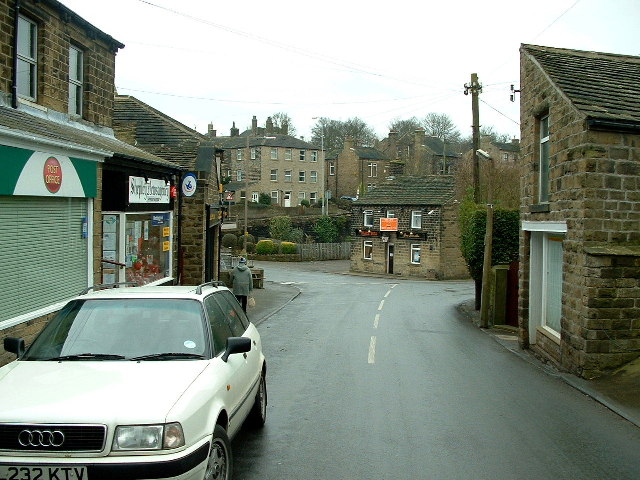
- Station Road

- Location within West Yorkshire
- OS grid reference: SE192097
  - London: 155 mi (249 km) SSE
- Civil parish: Kirkburton
- Metropolitan borough: Kirklees
- Metropolitan county: West Yorkshire
- Region: Yorkshire and the Humber
- Country: England
- Sovereign state: United Kingdom
- Post town: HUDDERSFIELD
- Postcode district: HD8
- Dialling code: 01484
- Police: West Yorkshire
- Fire: West Yorkshire
- Ambulance: Yorkshire
- UK Parliament: Ossett and Denby Dale

Shepley is a village in the civil parish of Kirkburton, in Kirklees, West Yorkshire, England. It lies 8 miles (13 km) south south east of Huddersfield and 6 miles (9.7 km) north west of Penistone.

In the 2011 census the population of Shepley and Birdsedge was 2,851.

Today, residents of Shepley have created a monthly magazine free to all who live there, named Shepley Magazine.

== History ==
=== Early origins ===
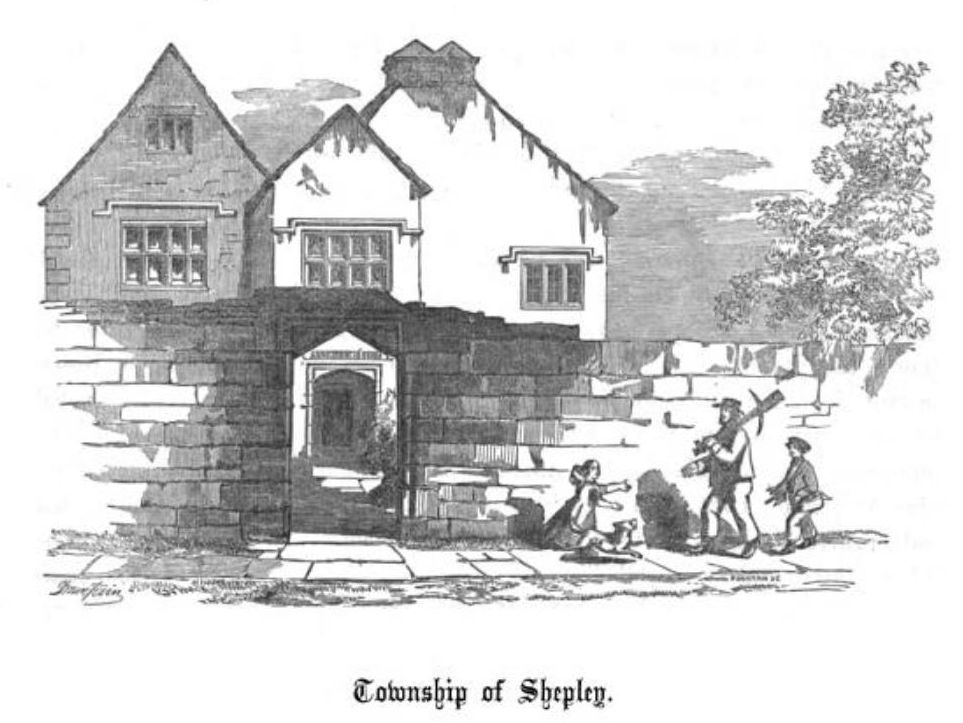
Shepley Hall

Historically the name 'Shepley' derives from Old English sceap ('sheep') and leah ('clearing'), thus meaning 'a clearing or meadow where sheep are kept'. However, Shepley is also situated on one of several local leys comprising Crossley, Longley, Shepley, Shelley, Emley, East Midgley, Coxley, Stanley, Scholey, Methley and Astley. The ley idea was introduced by antiquarian Alfred Watkins in his book 'The Old Straight Track' in 1925. He suggested that the ancient British used high points and hill tops as sighting points to help them navigate in a straight line and that 'ley' or 'leigh' place names actually mean "a grassy track across country". He perceived that many later Roman roads followed these straight ancient tracks. Some people also associate leys with the occult.

Evidence exists of earlier occupation in the area at Castle Hill (not to be confused with Castle Hill, Huddersfield), a small hilltop above Birdsedge that contains defensive works which might have been either a Roman or tribal look-out station. Some local historians claim that the ancient ridge above the Sovereign, known as 'Burnt Cumberworth' contained ancient furrows before they were destroyed by quarrying in the late 20th century.

=== Norman conquest and medieval period ===
'Sceaplei' is mentioned in the Domesday Book, written in 1086.

Shepley's population suffered during William the Conqueror's Harrying of the North 1069–1070 when the king laid to waste towns and villages between the Scottish border and the River Humber in order to put down a northern rebellion against his Norman rule. Thousands of people were put to the sword. However, the village was soon back in political favour, as in 1217, a certain Matthew of Sheplei was knighted and his name appears in the records of the Beaumont family of Whitley Beaumont and later of Bretton Hall near Wakefield.

There is a reference to Shepley in the Inquisitions Post Mortem, written in the 33rd year of Henry III's reign (1249).

"Extent. The vigil of St. Matthew, 33 Hen. III. Scheplay alias Sepeleya town, a capital messuage, 6l. rents from free tenants, 6s. 10d. from cottars, a mill, a little wood, &c. tenure unspecified."

If the township of Shepley was subinfeudated before 1166, Shepley's mesne tenancy would have been held by William de Neville, husband of Amabel, daughter of Adam, son of Sveinn. By the 13th century, the tenancy had passed to the Burgh family. Shepley Hall, situated on Station Road, was the manor house for the village. In 1361 Robert de Goldthorpe, who was also known as Robert Robertson (his father's name was Robert), married Esabell de Shepley and, as a result inherited part of the manor and estates of Shepley. In 1542, during the reign of Henry VIII (Tudor) Thomas Goldthorpe sold his share of Shepley manor and other lands for £290 to a certain Richard Stansfield and thereby appeared to terminate the family's connection with the manor. However, in the local fines records for 1543, it states "William Goldthorp, gent [held the] Manor of Shepley, also called Shepley Hall, and tenements in Shepley and [Kirk]Burton .

=== 19th century ===
In the early 19th century, Sir Joseph Radcliffe, 1st Baronet from Milnsbridge House was Lord of the Manor. He was created baronet for his role in suppressing the Luddites in the Huddersfield area following the murder of Marsden mill owner William Horsfall in 1812.

In 1868 Shepley was described as a township and chapelry in the parish of Kirkburton, upper division of Agbrigg Wapentake, West Riding County York. The village was also recorded as having 30 tailor's shops in a population of around 1,000. These would have sprung up as a result of the four mills around the village manufacturing fine woollen worsteds.

The Reverend Ben Swift Chambers, founding father of Everton and Liverpool football clubs was born in the nearby village of Stocksmoor. He lived in the old school house (now part of the village library) in Shepley when his father was school master. Ben is buried in the village.

=== Governance ===
Shepley was formerly a township and chapelry in the parish of Kirkburton, from 1866 Shepley was a civil parish, on 1 April 1938 the parish was abolished and merged with Kirkburton. In 1931 the parish had a population of 1668.

== Transport ==
Shepley is connected by the A629 (Rotherham – Skipton road) to Huddersfield through to Barnsley and Sheffield and by the A635/A636 to Wakefield through to Holmfirth. Shepley railway station is on the Penistone line which runs from Huddersfield to Sheffield via Barnsley.

== Amenities ==
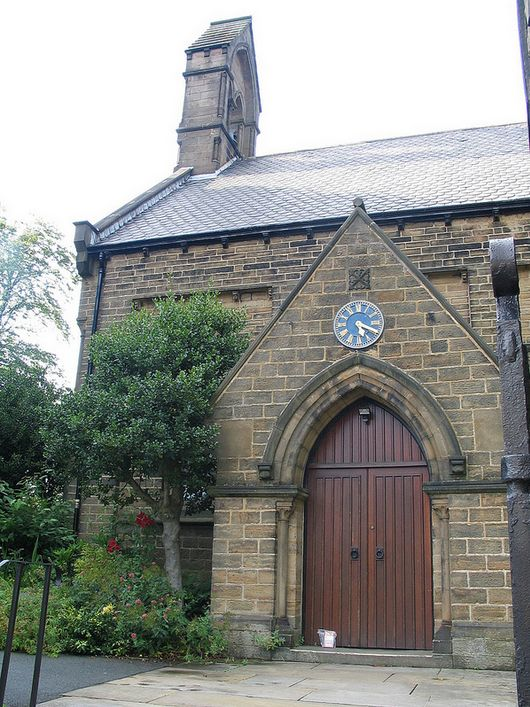
St Paul's Church

Shepley's amenities include St. Paul's Church (built in 1848 and used for both Anglican and Catholic services), a Methodist chapel, a first school catering for children aged between 4 and 10 years, a library and information point, a newly built health centre and pharmacy, and dentist's surgery. Shops include a cafe, florists, clothes shop, and a small co-operative food store, which became part of Central England Co-operative following refurbishment in August 2013.

The Black Bull and The Farmers Boy are the two public houses near the centre of the village. The Sovereign Inn, as well as the now closed The Cask and Spindle and The Toss O'Coin Inn all lie on the periphery.

== Clubs and societies ==
There are many sports facilities in the village including tennis, bowling, football and most prominently, Shepley Cricket Club is a member of the Huddersfield Cricket League. Shepley also has a Women's Institute, The Evergreens, Cubs and Scouts, Rainbows, Brownies and Guides and a regular village magazine.

There is a long tradition of music making in the village and Shepley Band is a very successful wind band.

The village association meets every month to discuss issues affecting the local community. Everyone who lives in the village can attend meetings. Villagers have also set up the Shepley Hub - a community enterprise company (CIC) - to safeguard the library from closure.

== Industry ==
Farming, manufacturing and quarrying are the predominant industries in the area. Farming would have been the village's main industry, although the wool trade started to grow from the 14th century onwards, gaining momentum following the Dissolution of the Monasteries.

Shepley is the home to one of the United Kingdom's largest bottled water companies, aptly named 'Shepley Spring'. The village also serves as a commuter belt for the cities of Manchester, Leeds and Sheffield.

=== Brewing ===
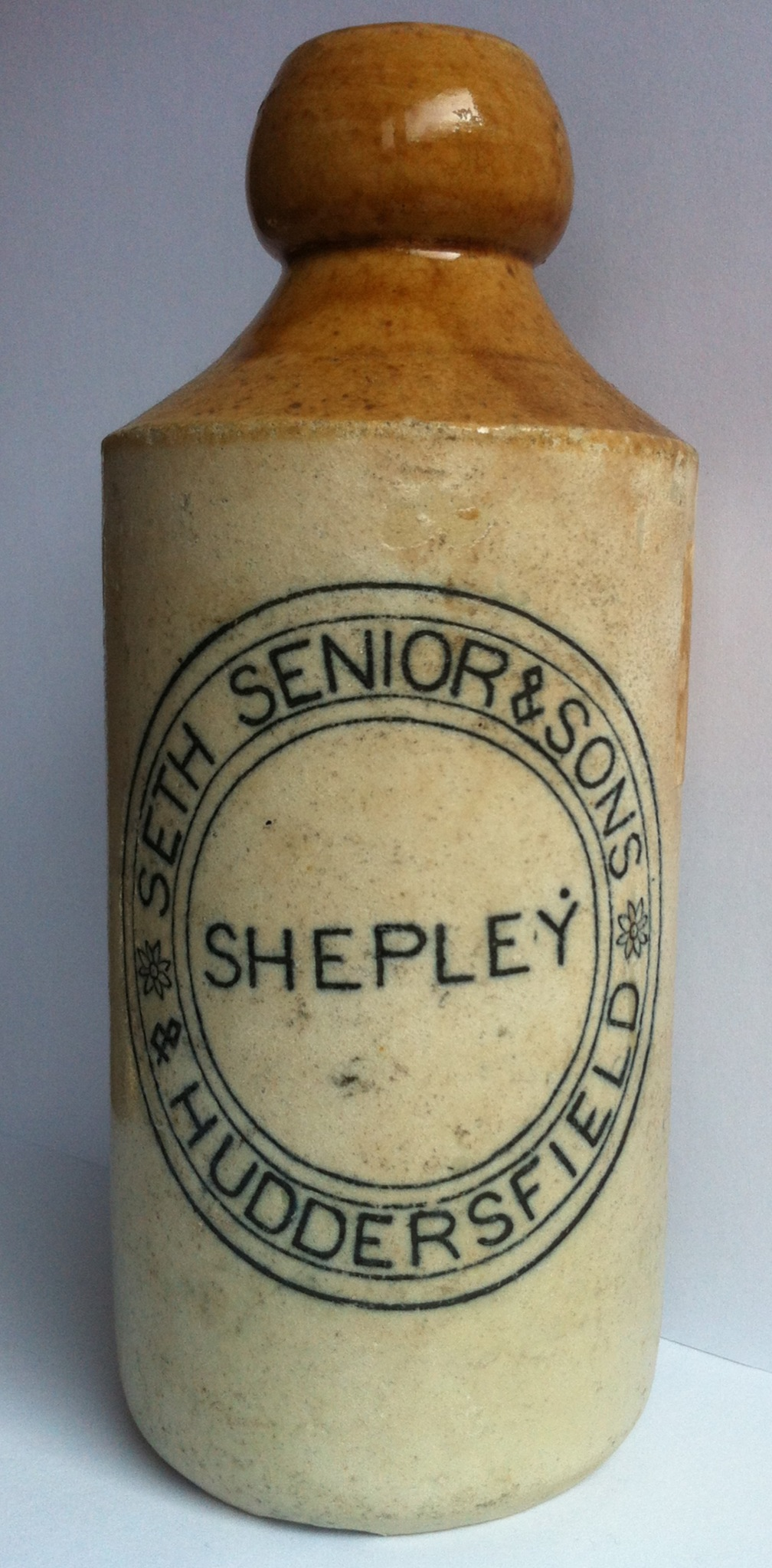
Stoneware beer bottle from the Seth Senior brewery

With a gold sovereign, Seth Senior was reputed to have established a brewery in 1829 at the Royal Sovereign Inn (now the 'Sovereign Inn'). As the business grew, the brewery was moved to Piper Wells on Holmfirth road. The Seniors eventually owned several public houses in the area, including the Railway (now the Cask and Spindle), The Black Bull, the Stagg's Head (the building can still be seen on Abbey Road), and the Farmer's Boy. The family also built Cliffe House. In 1946, the family business was taken over by Hammonds Brewery. The Senior family are all buried in the church yard at Upper Cumberworth a few miles away.

A stone carving of a man's face – a Yorkshire tradition to commemorate any builder killed during construction work – can still be seen on the Eastern gable of the Sovereign Inn. But, some also think that the carving is of Seth Senior himself. Members of the Roebuck family lived on this site for over 70 years and held the tenancy when the famous Sovereign Anthem was written in 1929 to commemorate 100 years of the brewery. Sarah Jane's death in 1976 ended Roebuck family ties with the Sovereign Inn.

=== Quarrying ===
Lane Head is also famous for the quarries that have provided stone used at Buckingham Palace in London, and other famous landmarks. The Lindley family used to own the quarry situated on Carr Lane, but it has now become part of the Marshalls Group, as have Appleton Quarries situated on Holmfirth Road. The son of a previous owner was once buried under a single tree next to the Round Wood above the quarry following a tragic accident in the late 1970s. However, his remains have now been re-interred elsewhere.

=== Turnpike roads ===
Climbing up the hill on the A629 from Shepley towards Lane Head, Toll Bar Cottage appears on the left just after the main gates of Cliff House. The cottage marked the place where gates once stood across the Barnsley and Shepley Lane Head Turnpike which was built by Blind Jack of Knaresborough in 1825 following an Act of Parliament passed two years earlier. Another Turnpike between Saddleworth and Shepley Lane Head via Holmfirth was constructed around this time, having been surveyed by Thomas Dinsley in 1819. As the name of the building suggests, a toll was collected at this point from travellers. The tolls were abolished on 1 August 1875.

== Lane Head ==
Lane Head is a hamlet to the south of the village which had a Quaker meeting house, built in 1696 and which has been a private dwelling since 1706. It had connections with the even older High Flatts meeting house in Birdsedge.

== Shepley Carr ==
Before the Barnsley and Shepley Lane Head Turnpike was built, this small hamlet was situated on the packhorse route from Penistone to Huddersfield. Merchants would travel from Penistone, through Thurlstone, along Broadstones Road and Dearne Dike Lane to Five Lane Ends, down Piper Wells Road, Cross Lane and Carr Lane, before turning down the long drive into Shepley Carr. The route would then follow the fields (before they were enclosed), past the Shepley War Memorial, and into the village. The travellers would then head out towards Stocksmoor and Farnley Tyas through Stones Wood (where Devil worship once took place). Some old locals tell stories of a ghostly coach and fours furiously speeding down the long drive on wintry nights before vanishing at the hamlet. The present house at Shepley Carr is the third building on this site and dates from 1862. A house which stood on the site previously burnt down in 1740.

During the early 19th century, the Tinker family lived at Shepley Carr. Ebenezer Tinker was responsible for building Tinker's Monument near Hill Top above New Mill. Deeds held at the West Yorkshire Archive Centre in Wakefield suggest that the original house at Shepley Carr dates from the 16th century and was owned by the Armytage Family of Kirklees Hall. The house was owned by the Bentley family from 1947 until 2002 after Harry Lawton Bentley, a local textile manufacturer, bought the hamlet by auction. Locals believe that Oliver Cromwell marched his army through Shepley Carr during the English Civil War 1642–1649. Roundheads, as the soldiers were known, were probably in Kirkburton, and at Catlin or Catling (now Cat Hill) Hall near Penistone, the latter having a holding post in the cellars upon which royalist prisoners were chained. Inside the parish church at Upper Cumberworth, there is a chair that Oliver Cromwell is reputed to have sat in.

== The Abbey ==
Part of the village situated on the A629 heading north towards Huddersfield is known as the Abbey, and some local street names are derived from this. No evidence exists to suggest that an abbey was ever built in Shepley. However, in 1219, Matthew de Shepley gave land in nearby Cumberworth and some unspecified land in Shepley to the monks of Roche Abbey. It seems highly likely that the site of 'Shepley Abbey' stands on some of this land.

The land and farm would have been granted off by Henry VIII following the Dissolution of the Monasteries in the 16th century, but the ownership is unclear until the house and farmland is mentioned in the papers of the Spencer-Stanhope family of Cannon Hall between Cawthorne and High Hoyland. The Shepley Abbey property first appears in these papers in 1674 and is last mentioned in 1800.

The Abbey and Farm were owned in the 19th century by the Armitage family who originally hailed from High Hoyland and are linked to the Spencer-Stanhopes. They owned one of the mills in Shepley, manufacturing fancy woollens.

== Nearby places ==
Towns and cities: Holmfirth 5 miles (8.0 km), Huddersfield 8 miles (13 km), Barnsley 8 miles (13 km), Wakefield 12 miles (19 km), Leeds 14 miles (23 km), Sheffield 15 miles (24 km), Manchester 30 miles (48 km).

Villages: Shelley, Kirkburton, Stocksmoor, New Mill, Birds Edge, Upper Cumberworth, Denby Dale, Skelmanthorpe,

== See also ==
- Listed buildings in Kirkburton
