= Listed buildings in Kirkburton =

Kirkburton is a civil parish in the metropolitan borough of Kirklees, West Yorkshire, England. It contains 165 listed buildings that are recorded in the National Heritage List for England. Of these, two are listed at Grade I, the highest of the three grades, three are at Grade II*, the middle grade, and the others are at Grade II, the lowest grade. The list also includes two listed buildings outside the parish but in Kirkburton ward; both of these are at Grade II. There are no major towns in the parish, but it contains villages and smaller settlements including Farnley Tyas, Flockton, Flockton Green, Grange Moor, Highburton, Kirkheaton, Lepton, Shelley, Shepley, Stocksmoor, Thunder Bridge, and Thurstonland. The parish is otherwise rural.

Until the Industrial Revolution the economy of the parish depended mainly on agriculture, and many of the listed buildings are farmhouses and farm buildings. The Industrial Revolution brought the woollen industry to the area, and this was initially a domestic process. Many of the listed buildings are weavers' cottages and other houses used for spinning wool, and these are characterised by long rows of mullioned windows, mainly in the upper storeys. Most of the listed buildings are constructed from stone and have roofs of stone slate. The other listed buildings include other houses and associated structures, churches, chapels and Sunday schools, items in churchyards, a village cross, public houses, milestones, mile posts, guide posts, and boundary stones, bridges, a wagonway viaduct, a stone tower, mills, a school, and a war memorial.

== Key ==
Grade	Criteria
I	Buildings of exceptional interest, sometimes considered to be internationally important
II*	Particularly important buildings of more than special interest
II	Buildings of national importance and special interest

== Buildings ==
Name and location	Photograph	Date	Notes	Grade
All Hallows Church, Kirkburton; 53.60869°N 1.70214°W		c. 1200	The north aisle was rebuilt in 1825, the clerestory in 1849–50, and the chancel in 1871. The church is built in stone with a stone slate roof, and consists of a nave with a clerestory (two parallel rows of high-up windows), north and south aisles, north and south porches, a chancel, and a west tower. The tower has an Early English doorway with a moulded arch and has a dog-tooth surround. Above it is a window with Perpendicular tracery and an embattled parapet. Along the south aisle are lancet windows, and the east window consists of three large lancets.	I
Highburton Cross; 53.61821°N 1.71265°W		Medieval	The base and the steps of the village cross are the earliest parts, with the upper parts dating from the 18th century. The cross consists of two steps, a square base, an octagonal shaft, a narrow neck with a small capital, and a ball finial.	II
St John the Baptist's Church, Kirkheaton; 53.65119°N 1.73096°W		Medieval	The oldest parts of the church are the tower and the north chancel chapel, the rest of the church being rebuilt in 1887–88 following a fire. It is built in stone with a stone slate roof, and consists of a nave, a lean-to south aisle, a north aisle with a pitched roof, a chancel with a south vestry and a north chapel, and a west tower. The tower is in Perpendicular style, and has a south porch, diagonal buttresses, a three-light west window, and an embattled parapet with corner crocketed pinnacles. Inside the chancel chapel are fine monuments.	II*
Royd Farmhouse and Barn; 53.64904°N 1.70413°W	—	Late medieval	A timber framed house that was encased in stone in the 17th century and altered in the 18th century and a barn to the left. The house has quoins, moulded kneelers, two storeys, and a gabled rear wing. The doorway has a massive lintel and a casement window to the right. The other windows are mullioned, with some lights blocked, some mullions removed, and the ground floor windows have hood moulds. The barn has a central segmental-headed cart entry and various doorways and windows.	II
Fuel Store southeast of Woodsome Hall; 53.62543°N 1.72790°W		15th century (probable)	A timber framed building in two parts with stone slate roofs. The north part has two storeys with lath and plaster infill, a hipped roof and it contains a doorway. The part to the south has a single storey and stone infill.	II
Woodsome Hall; 53.62604°N 1.72882°W		Early 16th century	Originally a timber framed house, it was encased in stone in the 17th century, and restored and altered in 1870–76. The roof is in stone slate and there are two storeys. The house consists of a hall range with projecting cross-wings, and an additional wing projecting further on the right. At the rear is a paved courtyard enclosed on all sides. In the angle between the left cross-wing and the hall is a two-storey gabled porch containing a doorway that has a moulded surround with imposts and a moulded Tudor arched lintel inscribed with a date. Some windows are mullioned and transomed, some are mullioned, and others are cross windows. In the courtyard is a colonnade of short Tuscan columns.	I
Small barn adjoining Upper Fold Farmhouse; 53.59051°N 1.75252°W		16th century (probable)	A small cruck-framed barn, later incorporated into an adjacent dwelling. It has various windows, and contains two cruck trusses.	II
Marsh Hall; 53.59717°N 1.75123°W		1596	The house is in millstone grit on a plinth, with a stone slate roof, two storeys, and a rear outshut. The doorway has chamfered reveals, a dated and initialled lintel, and a chamfered hood mould, and to the right is an inserted garage door. Most of the windows are mullioned, those in the ground floor have hood moulds, and there is a fire window.	II
Shepley Hall; 53.58519°N 1.70886°W		1608	The house, which has been altered and divided, is in stone, partly rendered, with quoins and a stone slate roof. There are two storeys, a double-depth plan, and a two-gabled front. Projecting from the front is a two-storey porch with a coped gable with cut kneelers. The porch contains a wide entrance with a deep arched and inscribed lintel, and above it is a mullioned and transomed window. Attached to the rear is a range of 19th-century cottages.	II
The Granary; 53.58502°N 1.70930°W	—	Early 17th century	A house that has been altered, it is in stone, rendered at the rear, with quoins, and a stone slate roof with chamfered gable copings. There are two storeys and an L-shaped plan with a projecting gabled wing on the left. The main doorway has a deep lintel and a hood mould. Some of the windows are mullioned, some have been altered, and some have hood moulds.	II
2 Low Fold, Low Fold Farm and 10 The Village, Thurstonland; 53.59002°N 1.75151°W		17th century	A farmhouse later extended and divided into three dwellings, it is in stone with quoins, and a stone slate roof with gable copings on moulded kneelers. There are two storeys, and an H-shaped plan consisting of a central range flanked by gabled cross-wings, with later additions. The doorway and windows have chamfered surrounds, some of the windows are mullioned, and some have been altered.	II
Blake House; 53.59794°N 1.74877°W	—	17th century	The house, which was altered in the 19th century, is in stone, it contains some timber framing, and has a stone slate roof with gable copings on moulded kneelers. There are two storeys, two gables on the west front and one on the east front, and a range extending to the south. Most of the windows are mullioned, some have hood moulds, and there is a staircase cross window.	II
Barn north of Blake House; 53.59835°N 1.74888°W		17th century	The barn is timber framed with stone walls, quoins, an asbestos roof, and a later extension at right angles. It contains a square-headed cart entry and chamfered ventilation slits.	II
Dairy west of Blake House; 53.59819°N 1.74927°W		17th century	Originally a barn, later used as a dairy, it has a timber framed core, stone walls and an asbestos roof. There are four bays and flanking aisles.	II
Croft Head Farm; 53.58492°N 1.70908°W	—	17th century	The house incorporates earlier timber framing, and was altered in the 18th century. It is in stone with quoins, a stone slate roof, and two storeys. On the front are two doorways, one with a re-set lintel with an inscription. Most of the windows are mullioned, and some mullions have been removed.	II
Crow Trees; 53.62788°N 1.71355°W	—	17th century	The house, which was extended later, is in stone with quoins, and a stone slate roof with hollow chamfered gable copings, moulded kneelers and finials. There are two storeys and a single-storey extension. The windows, with hood moulds, are in the gable ends, and include a ten-light mullioned and transomed window in the rear gable end.	II
Barn at Denby Grange Nurseries; 53.63983°N 1.64895°W	—	17th century	The barn has a timber framed core, with walls in stone, quoins, and a stone slate roof with hollow chamfered gable copings on cut kneelers, one with a finial. There are four bays, and an outshut to the north. On the south side are two segmental-headed entries and a small entry with a chamfered surround, and in the gable end is a Tudor arched doorway.	II
Fletcher House; 53.62156°N 1.75779°W		17th century	The house has a timber framed core, and is encased in stone in the ground floor, in red brick in the upper floor on the front and east return, and tile hung at the rear. The roof is in stone slate, there are two storeys and 3½ bays. In the ground floor is a modern bay window, and a tripartite casement window, and the other windows are mullioned.	II
Barn east of Manor House; 53.59665°N 1.68555°W	—	17th century (or earlier)	A aisled barn in stone with quoins and a stone slate roof. It has a rectangular plan and five bays. On the front is later brick porch with a slate roof, on the west side is a partly blocked entry, and in each gable apex is a small window.	II
Barn, New House Farm; 53.66852°N 1.73438°W	—	17th century	The barn is in stone with quoins and a stone slate roof. There is an extension to the left, and at the rear is an outshut forming a small aisle. The barn contains a cart entry on the right.	II
Shelley Hall; 53.59706°N 1.68823°W	—	17th century	A large detached house, later extended, it is in stone with quoins, a moulded eaves cornice, coped gables, and corner finials. There are two storeys and an attic, a double-depth plan, and extensions at the rear. The near-central doorway is partly blocked and has a moulded hood mould. Some windows are mullioned and transomed, some are mullioned, and above the doorway is an oval window with a chamfered surround. Above the ground floor is a continuous hood mould, and in the right return is a 20th-century two-storey porch with an embattled parapet.	II*
The Manor House; 53.61738°N 1.72045°W	—	17th century	A house that has been extended and divided, it is in stone on a plinth, and has a stone slate roof with chamfered gable copings on cut kneelers, and finials. There are two storeys, two gables on the front, and an extension on the left. The central doorway has a moulded surround, a deep lintel, and a plaque. Some windows are mullioned and transomed, some are mullioned, and some have hood moulds. In the extension are two doorways with chamfered reveals.	II
Principal barn, Thorne's Farm; 53.63523°N 1.69967°W	—	17th century	The barn has a timber framed core, later clad in stone and brick, and a stone slate roof. There are five bays and a south aisle. On the south side are outshuts flanking a square-headed cart entry.	II
Upper Fold Farmhouse; 53.59048°N 1.75238°W		17th century	The farmhouse, which has been altered and divided into three dwellings, is in stone, partly rendered, with quoins, and a stone slate roof with hollow chamfered gable copings on cut kneelers. There are two storeys, and on the front are doorways, some blocked, one with chamfered reveals and a deep lintel, mullioned windows, with some mullions removed, and hood moulds.	II
Barn east of Upper Fold Farmhouse; 53.59048°N 1.75204°W		17th century	A stone barn with quoins and a stone slate roof. It contains a square-headed cart entry, and a blocked entry at the rear, and there is an outshut on the right.	II
Principal barn southwest of Upper Fold Farmhouse; 53.59030°N 1.75264°W		17th century	The barn, later converted into a dwelling, is in stone with quoins and a stone slate roof. There are four bays, a square-headed opening in each front, and doorways with chamfered reveals and deep lintels.	II
Locker room building north of Woodsome Hall; 53.62636°N 1.72855°W	—	17th century (possible)	Probably stables with living accommodation above, the building has been much altered. It is in stone with quoins, and a stone slate roof with chamfered gable copings on moulded kneelers. There are two storeys, and it contains a central segmental-headed carriage entrance, flanked by Tudor arched doorways, and above are two-light windows. In the left gable end are external stairs leading to an upper floor doorway with an arched lintel.	II
Smiths Arms Public House; 53.61833°N 1.71229°W		1669	The public house, which was extended at the rear in the 19th century, is in rendered stone, with a stone slate roof and chamfered gable copings on cut kneelers. There are two storeys and a rear wing, The central doorway has an ornamental datestone, and the windows are mullioned.	II
Barn, Yew Tree Farm; 53.61125°N 1.75225°W		1671	The barn (under conversion to residential use in 2026) is in stone with a slate roof, two storeys, four bays, and a narrow recessed bay at the south with a stone slate roof. In the centre is a tall arched cart entry, above which is a semicircular dove hole and sill. In the ground floor are doorways and windows, and in the upper storey are three circular pitching holes. To the left is a building containing a Tudor arched doorway with a dated and initialled lintel.	II
Former dairy, Farley Tyas; 53.61099°N 1.75200°W	—	c. 1672	A barn, later used as a dairy, it is in stone with a corrugated roof. There is a single storey, three bays, a recessed bay to the north, and a narrower bay to the north of that. The building includes various openings, some blocked, including mullioned windows, and a partly blocked doorway with a heavy truncated pyramid-shaped lintel with a worn inscription.	II
51 and 53 The Village, Farnley Tyas; 53.61103°N 1.75162°W		1678	Two houses at right angles to each other, they are in stone with quoins, and stone slate roofs with hollow chamfered gable copings on moulded kneelers. There are two storeys, some windows are mullioned, some mullions have been removed, and there are two fire windows, one blocked, and the other dated and initialled.	II
Barn at 18 Manor Road, Farnley Tyas; 53.61139°N 1.74777°W		1693	The barn (now converted for residential use) is in stone with quoins, and a stone slate roof. There are two storeys, four bays, the fourth bay recessed, and a single-storey rear extension. On the front is a tall arched cart entry, and the other openings include circular pitching holes, doorways, windows, and ventilation slits. On the corner by the road is a quoin inscribed as a datestone.	II
Yew Tree Farm; 53.60758°N 1.70339°W		c. 1700	A farmhouse converted into a pair of cottages, it is in sandstone, partly rendered, with quoins and stone slate roofs. There are two storeys, in the centre of the south front is a doorway with a chamfered surround, and in the east front is a doorway with a moulded hood. The windows have single lights, or are mullioned, with some lights blocked, and in the north front is a Venetian window.	II
44 Manor Road, Farnley Tyas; 53.61177°N 1.74162°W	—	Late 17th or early 18th century	The house, which has been altered, is in stone with quoins, and a stone slate roof with hollow chamfered gable copings on cut kneelers. There are two storeys, and a central doorway with a chamfered surround and a deep shaped lintel. The doorway is flanked by four-light double-chamfered windows with hood moulds, some mullions have been removed, and in the upper floor are 19th-century windows.	II
55 The Village, Farnley Tyas; 53.61119°N 1.75199°W	—	Late 17th or early 18th century	A stone cottage with quoins and a stone slate roof. There are two storeys at the front, and one at the rear. Some windows are mullioned, some have been altered, and some have been replaced.	II
Cottage to rear of 9 Upper Fold Farmhouse; 53.59059°N 1.75231°W	—	17th or early 18th century	The cottage is in stone with quoins, a stone slate roof with chamfered gable copings on cut kneelers, and two storeys. One of the windows has been converted into a doorway, and the others are mullioned.	II
129 and 131 Huddersfield Road, Shelley; 53.59694°N 1.69102°W		1703	The house was extended to the rear in the 18th century, and has been divided. It is in stone, rendered at the rear, with quoins, and a stone slate roof with chamfered gable copings on cut kneelers. There are two storeys and a double-pile plan. In the centre is a doorway with a deep initialled and dated lintel, and above it is a hood mould that continues over the ground floor windows. Some windows have been altered, some are mullioned, and at the rear is a single-light window.	II
2 Town Gate, Highburton; 53.61808°N 1.71238°W	—	Early 18th century	The house is in rendered stone with quoins and a stone slate roof. There are two storeys and a single-storey outshut at the rear. Some of the windows are mullioned, some have single lights, some have been blocked, and some have hood moulds.	II
Birks Gate and attached outbuildings 53.59844°N 1.71701°W		Early 18th century	A small country house that has been extended, it is in stone, partly rendered, with roofs of slate and stone slate, and two storeys. The former entrance front has five bays, a central doorway with Doric columns and a decorative fanlight, casement and sash windows, and a moulded cornice and a parapet. The garden front has three bays, and contains a bay window and cross windows with Tudor hood moulds, over which are shallow gables with ball finials. Attached to the house is a single-storey billiard room, and a former coach house and stables.	II
Lane Head House; 53.57750°N 1.70809°W	—	Early 18th century	The house, which incorporates earlier features, is in stone with quoins, a moulded eaves cornice, and a stone slate roof with hollow chamfered gable copings on cut kneelers. There are two storeys and an L-shaped plan, consisting of a main range, a projecting wing on the left, and a rear outshut. The doorway has a moulded surround and a deep lintel inscribed with initials and the date, and a hood mould that continues over the ground floor windows. Most of the windows are mullioned, some mullions have been removed, and there are oval windows in the right gable end and in the outshut. The wing contains two partly-blocked doorways, one with a dated lintel, and a partly blocked loading door.	II
Lumb House Farmhouse; 53.59874°N 1.74275°W		Early 18th century	The farmhouse is in millstone grit, and has a stone slate roof with coped gables and cut kneelers, and two storeys. To the left is a blocked doorway with a moulded surround and a dated and initialled lintel. There is a later doorway to the right, and the windows are mullioned, with some mullions removed.	II
46 and 48 Town Gate, Highburton; 53.61789°N 1.71028°W	—	1727	A pair of houses in rendered stone with a stone slate roof and two storeys. In the right gable end is a doorway with a moulded surround and a cambered head inscribed with initials and the date. The windows are mullioned, some have been altered, and some mullions have been removed.	II
Marsh Hall Farmhouse and Barn; 53.59717°N 1.75134°W		Early to mid-18th century	The farmhouse, which was later extended, and the barn are in stone with quoins, and a stone slate roof with gable copings on moulded kneelers. The house has two storeys, a gabled front and a gabled extension to the west. It contains a doorway with a deep lintel and mullioned windows with some mullions removed. The barn has a square-headed cart entry on the south side and an outshut to the north.	II
Thorne's Farmhouse; 53.63528°N 1.69905°W	—	Early to mid-18th century	The farmhouse, with a cottage added later to the right, are in stone with quoins, moulded gutter brackets, and a stone slate roof. There are two storeys and an outshut at the rear. The house has a central doorway, the doorway to the cottage is to the left, and the windows are mullioned, with some blocked lights and some removed mullions.	II
Milestone, Kirkheaton; 53.66413°N 1.72080°W		1738	The milestone is at the junction of Hollin Hall Lane and Highgate Lane (B6118 road). It consists of a stone with a square plan, on a plinth, inscribed with the date, and on each side with the distances to Huddersfield, Barnsley, Halifax, and Dewsbury.	II
Milestone, Thurstonland Road; 53.59982°N 1.75015°W		1738	The milestone is at the junction of Thurstonland Road and Green Side Road. It consists of a stone with a square plan, surmounted by a moulded cap and a sundial. It is inscribed with the date, pointing hands, the directions to Penistone, Huddersfield, Honley, and Holmfirth, and the names of the local constable and the surveyor. The milestone is enclosed in an iron fence.	II*
3 Thunder Bridge Lane, Thunder Bridge; 53.59997°N 1.71632°W		18th century	A house at the end of a row, it was extended to the right in the early 19th century. It is in stone with quoins and a stone slate roof, the left part is lower, and both parts have two storeys. The doorway is in the right part, the doorway in the left part is blocked, and the windows are mullioned.	II
4 The Village, Thurstonland; 53.58980°N 1.75238°W		18th century	Most of the house dates from the 19th century, it is in stone with quoins, and a stone slate roof with coped gables and cut kneelers. There are three storeys, the doorway has a deep lintel, and the windows are mullioned with some blocked lights.	II
Old Forge, Kirkburton; 53.60943°N 1.70151°W		18th century	A cottage, later used for other purposes, including as a forge, it is in sandstone with a slate roof. There are two storeys, a rectangular plan, and a curved corner with a dentilled cornice. On the front are doorways and windows, and to the right is a mounting block.	II
Pinfold, Kirkheaton; 53.65968°N 1.72521°W	—	18th century (or earlier)	The pinfold has dry stone walls and is circular, about 8 metres (26 ft) in diameter. The entrance posts have been removed and the entrance walled up.	II
Pinfold, Shelley; 53.59651°N 1.68859°W	—	18th century (or earlier)	The pinfold has dry stone walls, it is approximately square and is partly enclosed by flat slabs. The entrance is at the northwest corner, between shaped gate posts.	II
The Temple, Whitley Park; 53.64867°N 1.68595°W		c. 1752–54	The building is in stone, lined with brick, and the roof is absent. It is an octagonal structure inside a square, with a pediment on each side, and a moulded eaves cornice and blocking course. On three sides are round-arched windows, and on the fourth side is a doorway that has an architrave with chambranles, a pulvinated frieze, and a cornice.	II
4 Top of the Hill, Thurstonland; 53.59091°N 1.75608°W	—	1753	A stone house with quoins and a stone slate roof. There are two storeys, two bays. and a rear lean-to extension. The central doorway has a deep lintel inscribed with initials and the date, the windows are mullioned, and at the rear is a staircase window.	II
Royd House Farmhouse (west part) and Farm Cottage; 53.62154°N 1.75275°W	—	Mid- to late 18th century	A house divided into two, it is in stone, rendered on the gable end, with quoins, a stone slate roof, two storeys, and a rear outshut extension. The near-central doorway is blocked, and there is a doorway in the gable end. In each floor are two three-light mullioned windows.	II
The Dumb Steeple; 53.64027°N 1.66477°W		1766	The building consists of a solid circular tapering stone tower about 23 feet (7.0 m) high on a plinth. It contains two string courses, and is surmounted by a tall conical roof. On the side is an inscribed and dated plaque.	II
School House, Thurstonland; 53.59307°N 1.74960°W	—	1766–67	The house is in stone with quoins, and a stone slate roof with gable copings on cut kneelers. There are two storeys and three bays. In the left bay is a round-arched doorway with a fanlight, above it is a single-light window, and to the left is an inscribed plaque. Each of the right two bays contains a Venetian window in the ground floor and a three-light mullioned window above.	II
2 Farnley Bank, Farnley Tyas; 53.61906°N 1.75150°W	—	Late 18th century	A stone house, later extended at the rear, it is in stone with quoins and a stone slate roof. There are two storeys, a symmetrical front of three bays, and mullioned windows. In the centre is a later gabled porch, with a two-light window above and three-light windows in the outer bays and the gable ends.	II
32 Manor Road, Farnley Tyas; 53.61133°N 1.74258°W	—	Late 18th century	A mirror-image pair of houses combined into one, it is in stone with quoins, a stone slate roof, and two storeys. In the centre are two doorway, the right one blocked, and the windows are mullioned, with one blocked light.	II
94A and 96 Lascelles Hall Road, Hill Side; 53.64860°N 1.72780°W	—	Late 18th century	The houses are at right angles, they are in stone with quoins and a stone slate roof, hipped on the corner. There are two storeys, and three bays on the front facing the road. Most windows are mullioned, and some have been altered.	II
112 Lascelles Hall Road, Hill Side; 53.64911°N 1.72832°W	—	Late 18th century	Two houses, later combined into one and extended. The house is in stone with quoins and a stone slate roof. There are two storeys, two bays, a single-bay extension to the left and a lean-to on the right. In the centre are two doorways with a single-light window over each, and the other windows are mullioned, with some blocked lights.	II
3 Woodsome Lees Lane, Kirkburton; 53.61744°N 1.72070°W	—	Late 18th century	A cottage in a group, it is in stone with quoins, a stone slate roof, and two storeys. The doorway has a deep lintel, to the right is a single-light window and a former doorway. The other windows are mullioned, with some blocked lights in the upper floor.	II
8, 14 and 16 Green Balk Lane, Lepton; 53.63194°N 1.70000°W	—	Late 18th century	A house, later extended and divided, it is in stone with quoins, moulded gutter brackets, and a stone slate roof with coped gables and cut kneelers. There are two storeys, a rear outshut, and the windows are mullioned.	II
6 and 8 Rowley Hill, Rowley Hill; 53.62961°N 1.71407°W	—	Late 18th century	A pair of stone houses with quoins, and a stone slate roof with coped gables and cut kneelers. There are two storeys and three bays. In the centre are two doorways, one window has been altered, and the others are mullioned with three lights.	II
63 Rowley Lane, Rowley Hill; 53.62858°N 1.71383°W	—	Late 18th century	A former weaver's house, it is in stone, partly rendered, with quoins, a stone slate roof, and two storeys. There is a near-central doorway, and the windows are mullioned, with some mullions removed.	II
20 and 22 Station Road, Shepley; 53.58510°N 1.70911°W	—	Late 18th century	A mirror-image pair of cottages, they are in stone with quoins, a stone slate roof, two storeys, and mullioned windows. The doorways are in the centre, in the ground floor are two four-light windows, and the upper floor contains four three-light windows.	II
15 and 17 Thunder Bridge Lane, Thunder Bridge; 53.59958°N 1.71660°W		Late 18th century	A pair of houses at the end of a terrace, they are in stone with quoins and a stone slate roof. There are two storeys, and each house has one bay. The windows are mullioned, some have been altered, and some mullions have been removed.	II
1 Butts, Thurstonland; 53.59305°N 1.73974°W	—	Late 18th century	A stone farmhouse with quoins, a sill band, moulded gutter brackets, and a stone slate roof with coped gables. There are two storeys and a symmetrical front of three bays. In the centre is a doorway, above it is a single-light window, and in the outer bays are three-light mullioned windows in each floor.	II
60 The Village, Thurstonland; 53.59060°N 1.74990°W		Late 18th century	A stone house, part of a row, with quoins, moulded gutter brackets, two storeys, and mullioned windows. The central doorway has pilaster jambs, a frieze and a pediment, above it is a two-light window, and to the sides are three-light windows in both floors.	II
72 The Village, Thurstonland; 53.59078°N 1.74953°W		Late 18th century	A former weaver's house, it is in stone, with quoins, a stone slate roof, and three storeys. The central doorway has a deep lintel, and on the front and rear are four-light mullioned windows.	II
Ash Cottage; 53.59163°N 1.74763°W	—	Late 18th century	A stone house in a group, with quoins, moulded gutter brackets, and a stone slate roof. There are two storeys and a symmetrical front of three bays. The central doorway has a deep lintel and on each side in both floors is a three-light mullioned window.	II
Farnley Hey; 53.61307°N 1.76825°W	—	Late 18th century	A stone house at the end of a row, with quoins, and a stone slate roof with coped gables and kneelers. There are two storeys, the near-central doorway has a deep lintel, and the windows are mullioned, including an eight-light window in the upper floor.	II
Gregory Farmhouse; 53.64978°N 1.69310°W	—	Late 18th century	A stone farmhouse with quoins, and a stone slate roof with coped gables and cut kneelers. There are two storeys and two bays. The doorway is in the centre, and there are two three-light mulliond windows in each floor. In the right gable end are external steps leading up to a doorway, and above it is a semicircular window.	II
Heights; 53.59909°N 1.75508°W	—	Late 18th century	A house and cottage combined into one dwelling, it is in stone with quoins, and a stone slate roof with coped gables and cut kneelers. There are two storeys, each part has a doorway, the windows are mullioned, and in the left gable end is a blocked loading door in the upper floor.	II
Lane Side House; 53.65122°N 1.71775°W	—	Late 18th century	A former weaver's house that was later extended, it is in stone with quoins and a stone slate roof. On the front are two doorways, and the windows are mullioned, with one blocked light.	II
Lascelles Hall; 53.64681°N 1.72610°W		Late 18th century	A large detached house that was later extended, it is in stone, with quoins, a moulded eaves cornice and blocking course, and a hipped slate roof. There are two storeys, the original part is symmetrical with five bays, and there are two added bays to the left. The middle bay of the original part projects forward under a pediment. Steps with side walls and ball finials lead up to a doorway with a moulded surround in a rounded recess, flanked by columns and pilasters, with an entablature and a segmental pediment. The windows are sashes.	II
Stable block and barn, Lascelles Hall; 53.64698°N 1.72511°W	—	Late 18th century	The stable block and barn are in stone with quoins and a stone slate roof, hipped at the rear. There are two storeys and a U-shaped plan, with a main block and projecting gabled wings. The wings have round-arched windows with impost blocks and keystone, and doorways, and in each gable end is an oculus. In the centre of the main range is an elliptical-arched carriage entrance.	II
Netherton Farmhouse; 53.61150°N 1.74408°W	—	Late 18th century	A stone farmhouse with quoins, and a stone slate roof with coped gables and cut kneelers. There are two storeys, two bays and a rear outshut. The near-central doorway has a deep lintel, and the windows, which are mullioned, have three lights to the left and two to the right.	II
The Beaumont Arms public house and adjoining buildings 53.65117°N 1.73022°W		Late 18th century	The public house is the older part, the adjoining dwellings and barns dating from the 19th century. The buildings are in stone with stone slate roofs, and the features include quoins, a modillion eaves cornice, a coat of arms, and coped gables with carved kneelers. Many of the windows in the early part have been altered, and in the later parts are sash windows. The barns form an L-shaped plan, and contain segmental-headed cart entries and round pitching holes.	II
The Woodman Public House; 53.59971°N 1.71652°W		Late 18th century	Originally two houses, the one to the right added in the 19th century, and later combined as a public house, it is in stone with quoins with a stone slate roof, and two storeys, Both parts have central doorways, the left part also has a porch, and most of the windows are mullioned, with some blocked lights, and some mullions removed.	II
Wood Farmhouse; 53.62495°N 1.73873°W	—	Late 18th century	A stone house with quoins and a stone slate roof. There are two storeys, a symmetrical front of three bays, and an outshut and an extension at the rear. In the centre of the front is a gabled porch with moulded coping on cut kneelers, one of which is dated, and a blind quatrefoil in a round panel in the gable. The doorway has a Tudor arch with sunken spandrels and a deep hood mould. Flanking the porch are small chamfered windows, and the other windows are mullioned.	II
Shelley Methodist Church; 53.59447°N 1.69645°W	—	1784–5	The vestry and organ chamber were added in 1842 and a meeting room in 1882. The church is in stone with quoins, and a stone slate roof with coped gables and cut kneelers. There are two storeys, and three bays containing square windows. In the organ wing are round-arched windows, and the meeting roof has sash windows and a Venetian window in the west gable end.	II
Clough Cottages; 53.59922°N 1.73682°W	—	1787	A house and attached cottage, the house being the older, and the cottage added in the 19th century. They are in stone, the house has quoins, the roof is in stone slate, and there are two storeys. The house has a doorway with a deep lintel, above it is an inscribed and dated plaque, and the windows are mullioned, with some mullions removed.	II
The Mansion (Storthes Hall Hospital); 53.61253°N 1.72178°W	—	1787–90	The house, which was later extended, is in stone with a moulded eaves cornice and a hipped slate roof. There are two storeys and an attic. The main range has a symmetrical front of seven bays, recessed to the left is a two-storey, three-bay extension, and at right angles to this is a five-bay wing. The middle three bays of the main range project under a pediment. In the centre is a portico with Tuscan columns and backing pilasters, a garlanded frieze, a cornice, and a segmental pediment, and the doorway has a fanlight. The windows are sashes, those in the ground floor with a moulded cornice, and at the rear is a Venetian window.	II
Ivy Farmhouse and barn 53.60495°N 1.75790°W	—	1790	A farmhouse and barn in one range, they are in stone with quoins, a stone slate roof, two storeys, and a rear extension. The house has a central doorway, above it is a recessed inscribed tablet, and the windows are mullioned, with some blocked lights. The barn to the right contains a central segmental-arched cart entry, a window and a doorway.	II
72 and 74 Paddock Road, Kirkburton; 53.61373°N 1.69470°W	—	1792	A pair of stone houses in a row, with quoins, a stone slate roof, and two storeys. In the centre are two doorways, above the right doorway is a plaque, and the windows are mullioned with one light blocked.	II
80 and 82 Paddock Road, Kirkburton; 53.61377°N 1.69496°W	—	1792	A pair of houses in a row, in stone, partly rendered, with a stone slate roof and two storeys. Some windows are mullioned, some have single lights, and in the centres is an inscribed and dated plaque.	II
Flockton Wagonway Viaduct; 53.63349°N 1.61848°W		1790s (probable)	The viaduct was built to carry horse-drawn coal wagons over a damp depression on its line between Lane End Colliery and the Calder and Hebble Navigation. It consists of 20 round stone arches with slightly corbelled out parapets with thin coping stones. The viaduct extends for about 55 metres (180 ft), it is about 3 metres (9.8 ft) wide, and each arch has a span of about 3 metres (9.8 ft).	II*
1 Woodsome Road, Fenay Bridge; 53.62621°N 1.72039°W	—	Late 18th or early 19th century	A former farmhouse and barn converted for residential use, it is in stone with quoins and a stone slate roof. The house has two storeys, two bays, a central doorway, and a three-light mullioned window on each side in both floors. The former barn to the right contains a segmental cart entrance and a doorway to the right.	II
118 Paddock Road, Kirkburton; 53.61548°N 1.69657°W	—	Late 18th or early 19th century	A stone farmhouse with quoins and a stone slate roof. There are two storeys and three bays. The doorway is in the centre, and the windows are mullioned, including a four-light window above the doorway.	II
118 and 120 Botany Lane, Lepton; 53.64130°N 1.70580°W	—	Late 18th or early 19th century	A pair of stone houses at the end of a terrace, the gable end rendered, with quoins, a stone slate roof, and two storeys. Each house has a doorway to the right and mullioned windows, with three lights in the ground floor and four lights in the upper floor.	II
84, 88, 90 and 92 Town Moor, Thurstonland; 53.59178°N 1.74798°W		Late 18th or early 19th century	A row of four cottages, one converted from a barn, they are in stone with quoins, a stone slate roof, two storeys, and a single-storey extension on the street front. The former barn has a segmental-arched opening, partly blocked and converted into a window. The other windows are mullioned, with some mullions removed, and some lights blocked.	II
Briars Cottage; 53.59092°N 1.75632°W	—	Late 18th or early 19th century	Originally two mirror-image houses, later combined into one, it is in stone, rendered at the rear, with a stone slate roof and two storeys. In the centre are two doorways, one blocked, and the windows are mullioned.	II
Former weaving establishment northwest of Copley House; 53.58471°N 1.68806°W	—	Late 18th or early 19th century	The building, which has been extended, is in stone with quoins, a stone slate roof and two storeys. Some windows are mullioned, some have single lights, and there is a doorway and a loading door.	II
Moorside House and Farm Cottage; 53.60906°N 1.73493°W	—	Late 18th or early 19th century	The cottage was added to the house later. They are in stone with quoins and have a stone slate roof. There are two storeys, the house has a central doorway, and there are mullioned windows in both house and cottage.	II
Square Hall; 53.62357°N 1.75034°W	—	18th or 19th century	A stone house with a stone slate roof, two storeys, and a single-storey extension to the south. The windows are mullioned, other than one casement window in the ground floor and one sash window in the upper floor.	II
Wood Nook Farmhouse; 53.60211°N 1.69656°W	—	Late 18th or early 19th century	A stone house with quoins, and a stone slate roof with gable copings on cut kneelers. There are two storeys, a central doorway over which is a plaque, and mullioned windows with some blocked lights.	II
Zion United Reformed Church, Flockton; 53.63064°N 1.65078°W		1802	The church is in rendered stone, with a moulded eaves cornice, a stone slate roof, and a front with a gable-pediment. There are two storeys, a symmetrical front of five bays and sides of three bays, and a single-storey wing at right angles on the left. On the front are two doorways, each with an architrave, a frieze and a cornice on carved consoles. In the ground floor are tall round-headed windows, the upper floor contains smaller segmental-headed windows, and in the tympanum of the pediment is an oculus. Inside the church are galleries on three sides and a double-decker pulpit.	II
Grave slab 53.65115°N 1.73051°W	—	1818	The grave slab is in the churchyard of St John's Church, Kirkheaton. It is in stone on a plinth, and is inscribed in memory of 17 children who died as a result of a fire in a mill at Colne Bridge.	II
Springfield Mill; 53.61314°N 1.71242°W	—	c. 1820	A second block was added at right angles to the original block in 1834. The building is in stone, partly rendered, and has slate roofs with coped gables. There are four storeys and attics. The north range has seven bays, the centre bay containing loading doors, and the outer bays with casement windows. The middle three bays project under a pediment containing a blind oval window and a clock in the tympanum. On the roof is a lantern and a finial. The east block has ten bays, the middle four bays projecting under a shallow gable, and containing a Venetian window. In the attics are continuous clerestory windows.	II
Monument; 53.65127°N 1.73051°W		1821	The monument is in the churchyard of St John's Church, Kirkheaton, and is to the memory of 17 children lost in a mill fire. It is in stone and consists of a short circular column on a square plinth with a frieze. At the top is a dentilled capital and a crest of foliage. On the plinth are inscriptions and the names of the children lost.	II
12, 14 and 18 Lascelles Hall Road, Cowmes; 53.64301°N 1.72653°W	—	Early 19th century	A row of four houses in a terrace, they are in stone and have a stone slate roof with coped gables. There are two storeys and each house has one bay. The doorways are on the right and the windows are mullioned, with four or five lights.	II
2, 4, 6 and 8 Haigh Lane, Flockton; 53.62893°N 1.64890°W	—	Early 19th century	A terrace of four stone houses with a sill band, a stone slate roof, and two storeys. Each house has a doorway to the right and a three-light mullioned window in each floor.	II
21 Far Dean, Highburton; 53.61924°N 1.71525°W	—	Early 19th century	A weaver's house in stone with a stone slate roof, two storeys and mullioned windows. The doorway is near the centre, to its left is a three-light window, on the right is a two-light window, and the upper floor contains a continuous 13-light window with three lights blocked.	II
14 and 14A North Road, Kirkburton; 53.61439°N 1.71175°W	—	Early 19th century	A mirror-image pair of weavers' houses, they are in stone, and have a stone slate roof with coped gables and cut kneelers. There are two storeys at the front and three at the rear, and each house has two bays. In the centre of each house is a doorway, most of the windows are mullioned, some have been altered and some lights have been blocked.	II
18 and 20 Dam Hill, Shelley; 53.59591°N 1.70955°W		Early 19th century	A pair of weavers' houses in stone with a stone slate roof. No. 18 has two storeys and No. 20 has three, and the windows are mullioned. There is a ten-light window in the upper storey of No. 18 and another in the middle storey of No. 20.	II
152 and 154 Penistone Road, Shelley; 53.59549°N 1.70730°W		Early 19th century	A pair of stone houses, partly rendered, that have a stone slate roof with coped gables and cut kneelers. There are two and three storeys and a symmetrical front. In the centre of each house is a doorway flanked by a single-light window, and the other windows are mullioned.	II
10 and 11 Cliffe Side, Shepley; 53.58321°N 1.71029°W	—	Early 19th century	A former weavers' house, later divided into two dwellings, it is in stone with a stone slate roof and three storeys. On the front is a near-central doorway, and the windows are mullioned with up to eight lights, and with some lights blocked.	II
5, 9 and 11 Thunder Bridge Lane, Thunder Bridge; 53.59987°N 1.71639°W		Early 19th century	Four houses, later part of a public house, the building is in stone with a stone slate roof, three storeys, and mullioned windows. In the ground floor are four doorways and three-light windows, and in each of the upper floors are four-light windows.	II
1, 2, 3 and 4 Hollow Gate, Thurstonland; 53.59000°N 1.75414°W		Early 19th century	A terrace of four stone houses with a stone slate roof and two storeys. On the front are porches, and the windows are mullioned, with some blocked lights. No. 1 has a window with eleven lights in the upper floor.	II
6 and 8 The Village, Thurstonland; 53.58983°N 1.75225°W		Early 19th century	A pair of cottages in a group, they are in stone with a stone slate roof, and two storeys. The near-central doorway has a deep lintel, and the windows are mullioned, with some mullions removed, and some lights blocked.	II
50 and 52 The Village, Thurstonland; 53.59047°N 1.75020°W		Early 19th century	Two houses in a row, they are in stone with stone slate roofs. No. 50 has two storeys, and No. 52 has three storeys and a porch. The windows are mullioned, including a six-light window in the upper floor of No. 50.	II
54 The Village, Thurstonland; 53.59050°N 1.75010°W		Early 19th century	A house, part of a row, it is in stone with a stone slate roof, two storeys, and mullioned windows. The doorway is to the right, and has a frieze and a small cornice. To the left and in the upper floor are three-light windows.	II
56 and 58 The Village, Thurstonland; 53.59055°N 1.75000°W		Early 19th century	A pair of cottages in a row, they are in stone, with a stone slate roof, and two storeys. The doorways are in the centre, and the windows are mullioned, with some mullions removed.	II
2 Top of the Hill, Thurstonland; 53.59077°N 1.75623°W	—	Early 19th century	A stone house with a stone slate roof, three storeys, and mullioned windows. In the ground floor is a three-light window and a doorway to the right. The middle floor contains a three-light and a single-light window, and in the top floor is a nine-light window reduced to four lights.	II
Beech Farmhouse; 53.61146°N 1.75012°W		Early 19th century	The farmhouse is in stone, and has a stone slate roof with gable copings on cut kneelers. There are two storeys, a central doorway, and two three-light mullioned windows in each floor.	II
Stable building east of Town Hall, Kirkburton; 53.61429°N 1.71271°W	—	Early 19th century	The former stable is in stone with rusticated quoins, modillion gutter brackets, and a hipped slate roof. There are two storeys, a round-arched carriage entrance to the right, and a central doorway and a window to the left, both round-arched and in recessed surrounds.	II
Thunder Bridge; 53.59892°N 1.71722°W		Early 19th century	The bridge carries Birks Lane over Shepley Dike. It is in stone and consists of a single segmental arch. The bridge has a band, parapets with replaced copings, and at the south end is a round abutment with a domed cap. There are inscriptions on the north parapet.	II
Thurstonland Methodist Sunday School; 53.59004°N 1.75418°W	—	Early 19th century	The former Sunday school is in stone, and has a stone slate roof with coped gables. There are two storeys and five bays. In the centre is a flat-roofed porch containing a round-arched window, and the other windows are casements.	II
Town Hall, Kirkburton; 53.61435°N 1.71298°W		Early 19th century	A house, at one time used as the town hall, it is in stone on a plinth, with a sill band, a moulded eaves cornice and blocking course, and a hipped slate roof with a lantern. There are two storeys, a front of three bays, and four bays on the sides. Steps lead up to a central portico with fluted columns and backing pilasters, and a full dentilled entablature. The windows are sashes, and on the right side is a staircase window.	II
Woodsome Bridge; 53.62563°N 1.72105°W	—	Early 19th century (probable)	The bridge carries Woodsome Road over Woodsome Beck. It is in stone, and consists of a single round arch. The bridge has string courses at the base of the parapets, and slightly rounded coping.	II
Former watermill, Manor Mill Farm; 53.62103°N 1.69579°W	—	c. 1832	The former cotton watermill is in stone and it has a stone slate roof with coped gables. There are two storeys at the front and three at the rear, and six bays at the front. At the rear are five bays, an outshut, and a wheel pit containing an enclosed waterwheel 51 feet (16 m) in diameter. The windows are casements, and in the gable end are two loading doors.	II
2–8 Lascelles Hall Road, Cowmes; 53.64284°N 1.72642°W	—	Early to mid-19th century	A terrace of stone houses at the end of a row with moulded gutter brackets, and a stone slate roof with gable copings on cut kneelers. One doorway is partly blocked, and the windows are mullioned.	II
65 The Village and barn, Farnley Tyas; 53.61106°N 1.75232°W		Early to mid-19th century	A former weaver's house and attached barn, they are in stone with moulded gutter brackets and a stone slate roof. The house has two storeys, an attic and basement, and a single-storey lean-to with quoins. The doorway is to the left, most of the windows are mullioned, with some blocked lights, there is a single-light window, and in the gable end is a partly blocked taking-in door. On the front of the barn is a central elliptical-arched cart entry and small doorways, and at the rear is a central threshing door and a casement window.	II
18 Green Balk Lane, Lepton; 53.63157°N 1.69987°W	—	Early to mid-19th century	A former weaver's house, it is in stone with a stone slate roof and two storeys. The former central doorway has been partly blocked and converted into a window, and the other windows are millioned.	II
37 Rowley Lane, Rowley Hill; 53.62792°N 1.71551°W	—	Early to mid-19th century	A former pair of weavers' houses, later combined into one, it is in stone with a slate roof, two storeys, and mullioned windows. In the centre is a later porch flanked by four-light windows, and in the upper floor are two six-light windows.	II
37 Cliffe Road, Shepley; 53.58252°N 1.71313°W	—	Early to mid-19th century	A stone house with a sill band, a stone slate roof, two storeys, and mullioned windows. In the ground floor is a doorway and a four-light widow, and the upper floor contains a seven-light window.	II
15, 19 and 21 Cross Lane, Stocksmoor; 53.59387°N 1.72814°W	—	Early to mid-19th century	A terrace of four, later three, houses in millstone grit with a stone slate roof. There are two storeys, four doorways, and the windows are mullioned, with some lights blocked.	II
Butts Farmhouse; 53.59286°N 1.74102°W	—	Early to mid-19th century	A stone farmhouse with quoins, a stone slate roof, two storeys, and an outshut at the rear. In the centre is a doorway with a blocking loading door above, and the windows are mullioned.	II
Croft Cottage; 53.59600°N 1.69023°W	—	Early to mid-19th century	A stone house that has a stone slate roof with coped gables and cut kneelers, and two storeys. In the centre is a doorway and a later porch, and the windows are mullioned.	II
Darnley Cottage; 53.61933°N 1.71544°W	—	Early to mid-19th century	A former weaver's cottage, it is in sandstone with a sill band and a stone slate roof. There are two storeys, cellars and a rear basement, and the windows are mullioned. The doorway is to the right, to its left is a three-light window, and in the upper floor is a six-light window.	II
Milestone opposite 31 Penistone Road; 53.63410°N 1.72427°W		Early to mid-19th century	The milestone is on the west side of Penistone Road (A629 road), and consists of a stone post with a triangular plan. It is inscribed with the distances to Huddersfield and Penistone.	II
Milestone north of junction with Far Dean; 53.62065°N 1.71816°W		Early to mid-19th century	The milestone is on the west side of Penistone Road (A629 road), and consists of a stone post with a triangular plan. It is inscribed with pointing hands, and the distances to Huddersfield and Penistone.	II
Milestone north of junction with Riley Lane; 53.60695°N 1.71176°W		Early to mid-19th century	The milestone is on the east side of Penistone Road (A629 road), and consists of a stone post with a triangular plan. It is inscribed with pointing hands, and the distances to Huddersfield and Penistone.	II
Milestone at junction with Lydgate Road; 53.58583°N 1.70480°W		Early to mid-19th century	The milestone is on the north side of Penistone Road (A629 road), and consists of a stone post with a triangular plan. It is inscribed with the distances to Huddersfield and Penistone.	II
Thurstonland Methodist Chapel; 53.58987°N 1.75348°W		1836	The chapel, later converted for residential use, is in stone, partly rendered, and has a stone slate roof with coped gables. There are two storeys, a basement at the rear, and a pedimented front of three bays. The central doorway has a segmental pediment, and the windows are a mix of sashes and casements. Towards the top are two string courses, between them is an inscribed tablet, and in the tympanum of the pediment is an elliptical recess.	II
St Lucius' Church, Farley Tyas; 53.61060°N 1.75317°W		1838–40	The church was designed by R. D. Chantrell, and is built in stone with a stone slate roof. It consists of a nave, a south porch, a chancel, and a west tower. The tower has two stages, diagonal buttresses, a stair turret, a west window, and a squat octagonal spire on a splayed base. The east window has four lights with Perpendicular tracery.	II
St Paul's Church, Shepley; 53.58370°N 1.71204°W		1847–48	The church was designed by William Wallen in Early English style, the chancel was added in 1868, and the organ chamber in 1880. It is built in stone with an ornamental slate roof, and consists of a nave, a south porch, and a chancel. The windows are lancets, and at the west end are three stepped lancets, above which is a mandorla shaped window, and on the gable apex is a bellcote.	II
31 and 33 Far Dean, Highburton; 53.61891°N 1.71433°W	—	Mid-19th century	A pair of mirror-image former weavers' houses, they are in stone, with moulded gutter brackets, and a stone slate roof with gable copings on cut kneelers. There are two storeys, two central doorways with a common jamb, and mullioned windows.	II
Copley House; 53.58453°N 1.68787°W	—	Mid-19th century	A pair of former weavers' houses, they are in stone with moulded gutter brackets, and a stone slate roof with gable copings on cut kneelers. There are two storeys and a attic, and the windows are mullioned. In the centre are two doorways flanked by three-light windows, and in the upper floor is a continuous 14-light window.	II
Gate and gate pier, East Lodge; 53.61345°N 1.71133°W		Mid-19th century	At the entrance to the mill are cast iron gates with scroll decoration, and with the maker's name on the lock. There is one stone gate pier, the other gate being supported by the wall of the lodge.	II
Guide post, Shelley; 53.59681°N 1.69175°W		Mid-19th century	The guide post at the junction of Huddersfield Road (B6116 road) and Far Bank consists of a stone post with a triangular plan. It is inscribed with pointing hands on both sides, on the left side "TO SHEPLEY" and the distance to Holmfirth, and on the right side "TO KIRKBURTON" and the distances to Huddersfield, Skelmanthorpe, and Barnsley.	II
Guide post south of Kirkburton; 53.60524°N 1.71202°W		Mid-19th century	The guide post at the junction of Penistone Road (A629 road) and Riley Lane consists of a circular stone post with a round top. It is inscribed with pointing hands, on the top is "STICK NO BILLS", and lower are the distances to Huddersfield, Kirkburton, Penistone, and Shepley.	II
Guide post between Thurstonland and Stocksmoor; 53.59282°N 1.73959°W		Mid-19th century	The guide post is at the junction of Ing Head Lane and Brown Knoll Road, and consists of a square post with a domed top. It is inscribed with pointing hands, and the directions to Shelley, Shepley, Holmfirth, Farnley and Fulstone.	II
Guide post northwest of Thunder Bridge; 53.60284°N 1.73606°W		Mid-19th century	The guide post is at the junction of Wood Lane and Farnley Road, and consists of a slender stone post built into a wall. It is inscribed with a pointing hand, and the direction to Thunder Bridge.	II
Lodge, Springfield Mill; 53.61350°N 1.71340°W		Mid-19th century	The lodge at the entrance to the mill is in stone with a hipped and sprocketted ornamental slate roof with wide eaves. There is one storey and a canted north end with angle pilasters. The doorway and the windows, which are sashes have round heads, imposts, and keystones.	II
Ward boundary post opposite Marsh Lane Top; 53.57462°N 1.72637°W		Mid-19th century	The post is on the northwest side of Penistone Road (A635 road), and marks the boundary between the wards of Fulstone and Shepley. It consists of a stone with a rounded top, inscribed with a vertical line and the names of the wards.	II
Guide post southeast of Farnley Tyas; 53.60503°N 1.73775°W		1861	The guide post is at the junction of Storthes Hall Lane and Farnley Road, and consists of a square post with a domed top. It is inscribed with pointing hands, the directions to Thurstonland, Farnley, and Kirkburton, and the name of the surveyor.	II
Boundary stone south of junction with Penistone Road; 53.60439°N 1.71275°W		Mid- to late 19th century	The stone is on the west side of Thunder Bridge Lane, and marks the boundary between the parishes of Shelley and Kirkburton. It has a triangular plan and has the names of the parishes inscribed on the sides.	II
Boundary stone south of junction with Riley Lane; 53.60433°N 1.71218°W		Mid- to late 19th century	The stone is on the east side of Penistone Road (A629 road), and marks the boundary between the parishes of Shelley and Kirkburton. It has a triangular plan and has the names of the parishes inscribed on the sides both horizontally and vertically.	II
Boundary stone opposite entrance to Rowley Mills; 53.62446°N 1.71868°W		Mid- to late 19th century	The stone is on the west side of Penistone Road (A629 road), and marks the boundary between the parishes of Lepton and Kirkburton. It has a triangular plan and has the names of the parishes inscribed on the sides.	II
Milepost in front of 24 Wakefield Road, Cowmes; 53.64368°N 1.72873°W		Mid- to late 19th century	The milepost is on the southwest side of Wakefield Road (A642 road). It is in cast iron on a stone post, and has a triangular plan and a rounded top. On the top is inscribed "WAKEFIELD & AUSTERLANDS ROAD" and "LEPTON", and on the sides are the distances to Huddersfield, Horbury and Wakefield.	II
Milepost in front of football ground, Lepton; 53.63471°N 1.71129°W	—	Mid- to late 19th century	The milepost is on the south side of Wakefield Road (A642 road). It is in cast iron on a stone post, and has a triangular plan and a rounded top. On the top is inscribed "WAKEFIELD & AUSTERLANDS ROAD" and "LEPTON", and on the sides are the distances to Huddersfield, Horbury and Wakefield.	II
Milepost east of White House Inn, Lepton Edge; 53.63292°N 1.68702°W		Mid- to late 19th century	The milepost is on the south side of Wakefield Road (A642 road). It is in cast iron on a stone post, and has a triangular plan and a rounded top. On the top is inscribed "WAKEFIELD & AUSTERLANDS ROAD" and "LEPTON", and on the sides are the distances to Huddersfield, Horbury and Wakefield.	II
Milepost east of junction with Barnsley Road, Grange Moor; 53.63573°N 1.66335°W	—	Mid- to late 19th century	The milepost is on the south side of Wakefield Road (A642 road). It is in cast iron on a stone post, and has a triangular plan and a rounded top. On the top is inscribed "WAKEFIELD & AUSTERLANDS ROAD" and "UPPER WHITLEY", and on the sides are the distances to Huddersfield, Horbury and Wakefield.	II
Milepost west of junction with Grange Lane, Grange Park; 53.63734°N 1.63890°W	—	Mid- to late 19th century	The milepost is on the south side of Wakefield Road (A642 road). It is in cast iron on a stone post, and has a triangular plan and a rounded top. On the top is inscribed "WAKEFIELD & AUSTERLANDS ROAD" and "UPPER WHITLEY", and on the sides are the distances to Huddersfield, Horbury and Wakefield.	II
Milestone at junction with Wakefield Road; 53.63532°N 1.66643°W		Mid- to late 19th century	The milepost is on the southwest side of the roundabout at the junction of Wakefield Road (A642 road) and Barnsley Road (A637 road). It is in cast iron on a stone post, and has a triangular plan and a rounded top. On the top is inscribed "BARNSLEY & GRANGE MOOR ROAD" and "WHITLEY UPPER", and on the sides are the distances to Barnsley, Huddersfield and Bretton.	II
Milestone in front of 30 Barnsley Road; 53.62984°N 1.64569°W		Mid- to late 19th century	The milepost is on the south side of Barnsley Road (A637 road). It is in cast iron on a stone post, and has a triangular plan and a rounded top. On the top is inscribed "BARNSLEY & GRANGE MOOR ROAD" and "FLOCKTON", and on the sides are the distances to Barnsley, Huddersfield and Bretton.	II
Milestone in front of 263 Barnsley Road; 53.63273°N 1.62260°W	—	Mid- to late 19th century	The milepost is on the southwest side of Barnsley Road (A637 road). It is in cast iron on a stone post, and has a triangular plan and a rounded top. On the top is inscribed "BARNSLEY & GRANGE MOOR ROAD" and "FLOCKTON", and on the sides are the distances to Barnsley, Huddersfield and Bretton.	II
Emmanuel Church, Shelley; 53.59789°N 1.68134°W		1866–68	The church is in Gothic Revival style, and is built in stone with a slate roof. It consists of a nave, a south aisle, a chancel, and a south west tower. The tower has three stages, angle buttresses, a south doorway, clock faces in three sides, an embattled parapet with gargoyles, and a squat pyramidal spire. At the east end of the aisle is a rose window, the west window has four lights, and the east window has three lights.	II
St John's Church, Lepton; 53.63203°N 1.69919°W		1866–68	The church is in Early English style, and the tower was completed in 1778. It is built in stone with a slate roof, and consists of a nave, a south aisle, a chancel with a south vestry and organ chamber, and a southwest tower. The tower has three stages, a south doorway, clock faces, and an embattled parapet with mock machicolation.	II
St James' Church, Flockton; 53.63032°N 1.63832°W		1867–69	The church, designed by W. H. Crossland in Gothic Revival style, is built in stone with a slate roof. It consists of a nave, a lean-to north aisle, a south porch, and a chancel. At the west end is a bellcote, and the windows contain Decorated tracery.	II
St Thomas' Church, Thurstonland; 53.59317°N 1.75061°W		1869–70	The church is in Gothic Revival style, and is built in stone with a slate roof. It consists of a nave, a chancel, and a south steeple at the east end of the nave. The steeple has a tower with three stages, a stair turret, buttresses, a south doorway above which is a niche with a canopy containing a statue, a clock face, and a splay-footed spire with lucarnes.	II
Cliffe House; 53.58134°N 1.71114°W	—	1888–89	A house, later used for other purposes, it is in stone on a chamfered plinth, with bands, and a Westmorland slate roof. There are two storeys, and attic and a basement, sides of three bays, a double-depth plan, and at the rear are single-storey extensions, one a billiard room, and the other an outbuilding. The entrance is in the middle bay and has a doorway with an architrave and a canopy. Above it is a three-light window and a timber framed gable with moulded bargeboards and bressumers. The outer bays contain mullioned and transomed windows.	II
Shepley First School; 53.58304°N 1.70789°W	—	1896	The school is in stone with slate roofs, it is in free Northern Renaissance style, and consists of a two-storey central hall and flanking single-storey classrooms. The central part is gabled and contains a large elliptical-head window with Ionic colonnettes, over which is a pediment with carving in the tympanum and urns. The classrooms have pyramidal roofs with clerestory windows and gablets, and between them are entrances with engaged Ionic columns and swan-necked pediments.	II
The Lodge; 53.61263°N 1.72597°W		c. 1903	The lodge at the entrance to Storthes Hall Park is in stone, the upper part rendered, with quoins, tapering buttresses, wide eaves, and a hipped tile roof. There is one storey and an attic, and a T-shaped plan. In the centre is a wide segmental-head entrance with a recessed doorway flanked by small-paned casement windows, forming a bay window on the left. At the front and sides are wide flat-roofed dormers.	II
Gate piers and gates at The Lodge; 53.61276°N 1.72587°W	—	1903	The gate piers flanking the entrance to the drive to Storthes Hall Park are in stone and have moulded caps. Between them are wrought iron gates in Art Nouveau style, each gate containing a central panel with foliage and a cartouche with the date.	II
Shepley War Memorial; 53.58147°N 1.70468°W	—	1921	The war memorial stands in an area of woodland to the east of the village, and consists of a bronze statue on a pedestal, plinth and base of Cornish granite. The statue depicts a soldier in battledress standing with his head bowed, holding a rifle. The pedestal has a moulded base, a string course, and a cornice, and contains bronze plaques with inscriptions, the names of those lost in the two World Wars, and the names of those who served in the First World War.	II
