= Stocksmoor =

Hamlet in West Yorkshire, England

Coordinates: 53.594°N 1.728°W

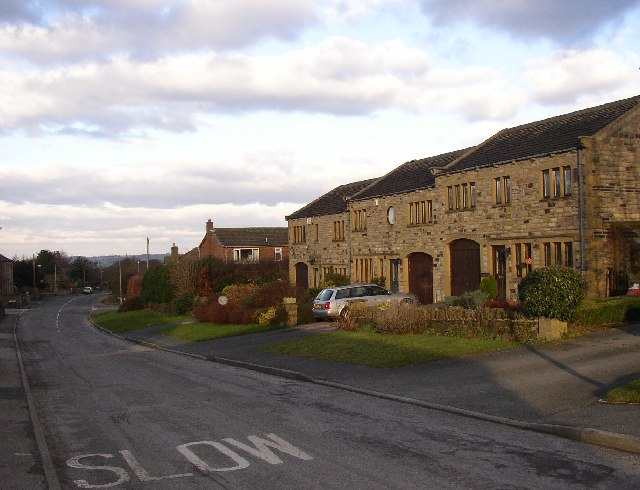
New houses in Stocksmoor, Thurstonland, Yorkshire. Stocksmoor is expanding into a village, perhaps because it has a station on the Huddersfield to Sheffield railway. There are more similar houses on the other side of the road.

Stocksmoor is a hamlet, near Huddersfield, West Yorkshire, England. It is situated between the villages of Shepley and Brockholes. The total population of Thurstonland, Stocksmoor and Thunder Bridge together was 953 in the 2001 census.

It has a railway station on the Penistone railway line which connects Huddersfield and Sheffield and is the traditional terminus of the 341 (First Huddersfield) bus service from Huddersfield town centre.

Stocksmoor is the birthplace of Ben Swift Chambers, the church minister who, in Liverpool, founded St Domingo's parish football team, which became Everton Football Club.

In 1838, upwards of 1,000 small Roman coins of copper and brass were found at Whistones, Stocks Moor. The Times of London describes how they were found by a labouring man who was digging in a field not far from Thurstonland and found them near the foundation of a wall. Yet, 'as is often the case in such discoveries, being a stranger to their value, he was induced to part with them to different individuals for a trifling consideration.' It then goes on to describe how they 'understand that among the coins discovered at Thurstonland there are many of the lower empire, several of Carausius, who, it will be remembered, possessed himself of Britain, as emperor, under Dioclesian, and who repaired the Roman wall in Scotland. In the collection purchased by one individual there are the coins of Constantine, Constantius, Lucilius, and others.'

== See also ==
- Listed buildings in Kirkburton
