= Thurstonland =

Village in West Yorkshire, England

Coordinates: 53.59°N 1.75°W

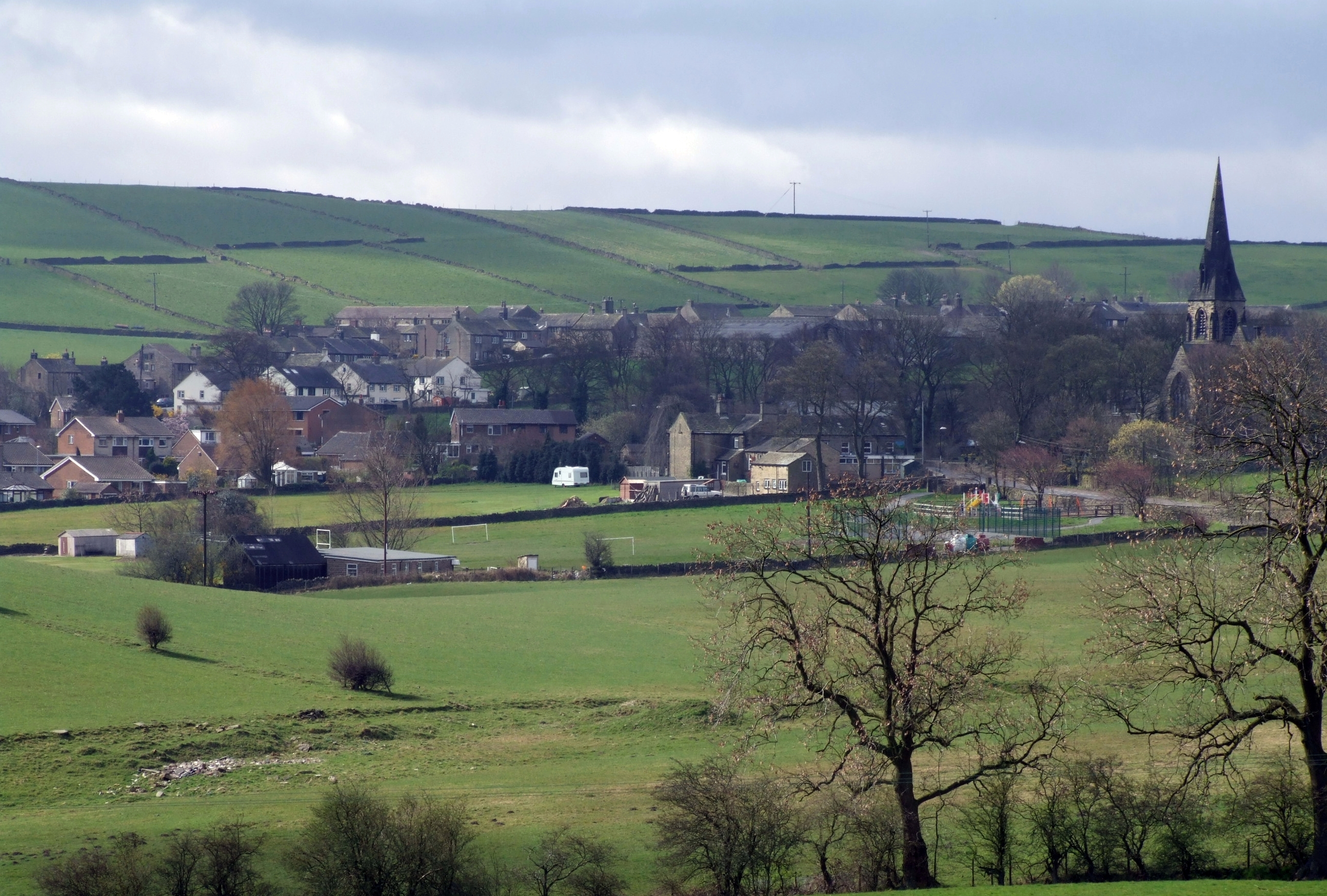
- Thurstonland village, church and cricket field

- Location within West Yorkshire
- Civil parish: Kirkburton
- Metropolitan borough: Kirklees
- Metropolitan county: West Yorkshire
- Region: Yorkshire and the Humber
- Country: England
- Sovereign state: United Kingdom
- Post town: HUDDERSFIELD
- Postcode district: HD4
- Dialling code: 01484
- Police: West Yorkshire
- Fire: West Yorkshire
- Ambulance: Yorkshire
- UK Parliament: Dewsbury and Colne Valley

Thurstonland is a village in the civil parish of Kirkburton, in Kirklees, West Yorkshire, England. It has a population of almost 400.

The village is on a hilltop above Brockholes, south-east of Farnley Tyas and north of Shepley. It is a few miles outside the borders of the Peak District National Park.

The village has a public house, first school (Thurstonland Endowed First School), church, children's recreational area and cricket club. Apart from the pub on the southern edge of the village the other facilities are all located next to each other, at the northern edge. Through the hill is the Thurstonland Tunnel on the Penistone railway line, between Brockholes railway station and Stocksmoor railway station.

Within and around the village are a number of small dairy farms that supply the surrounding area.

== History ==
The name Thurstonland derives from the Old Norse Thorsteinnland meaning 'Thorsteinn's land'.

The village was mentioned as Tostenland in the Domesday Book of 1086.

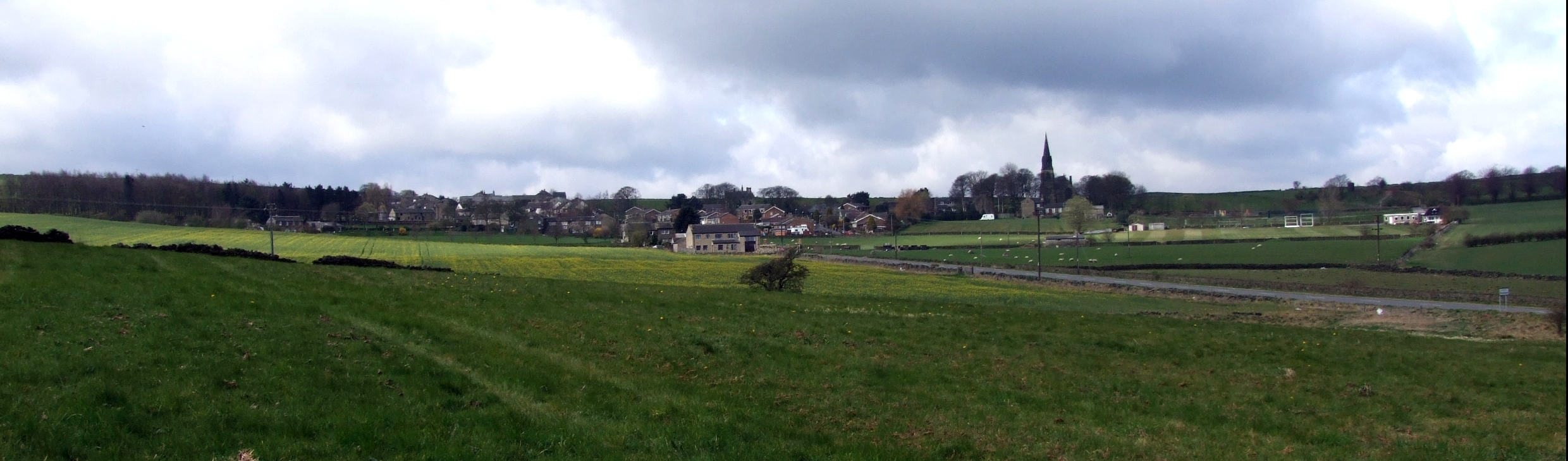
Thurstonland, viewed from Browns Knoll Road

The Wakefield court rolls indicate the village was a township in 1275, when 'Storthes in Thurstonland' is mentioned and 'Matthew de Storthes', in the reign of Henry III (1216 to 1272) lived in the area. In 1541 Henry VIII granted "to John Storthes of Shitlington, but likewise of Storthes Hall, gentleman" the manor of Thurstonland and other lands that had been the property of Roche Abbey.

Storthes Hall, on the northern boundary of the township, was the location of a family mansion. It is now the site of a residential campus for the University of Huddersfield. In 1921 the parish had a population of 2,488.

== Governance ==
Thurstonland was formerly a township and chapelry in the parish of Kirkburton, in 1866 Thurstonland became a civil parish. Thurstonland Urban District was created in 1894. The urban district was merged with Farnley Tyas in 1925 and renamed Thurstonland and Farnley Tyas Urban District. The urban district was abolished in 1938 under a County Review Order and most of the district was merged into Kirkburton Urban District and the remainder into the Holmfirth Urban District.

== Sport ==
The cricket club was founded in 1874 by a group of local enthusiasts. The club acquired a site in 1901, which was their third home. The club's Edwardian-style wooden pavilion was built in 1910. The club played in the Huddersfield Cricket League and ran teams for seniors and juniors.

== See also ==
- Listed buildings in Kirkburton
