= Woodsome Hall =

Country house in Farnley Tyas, England

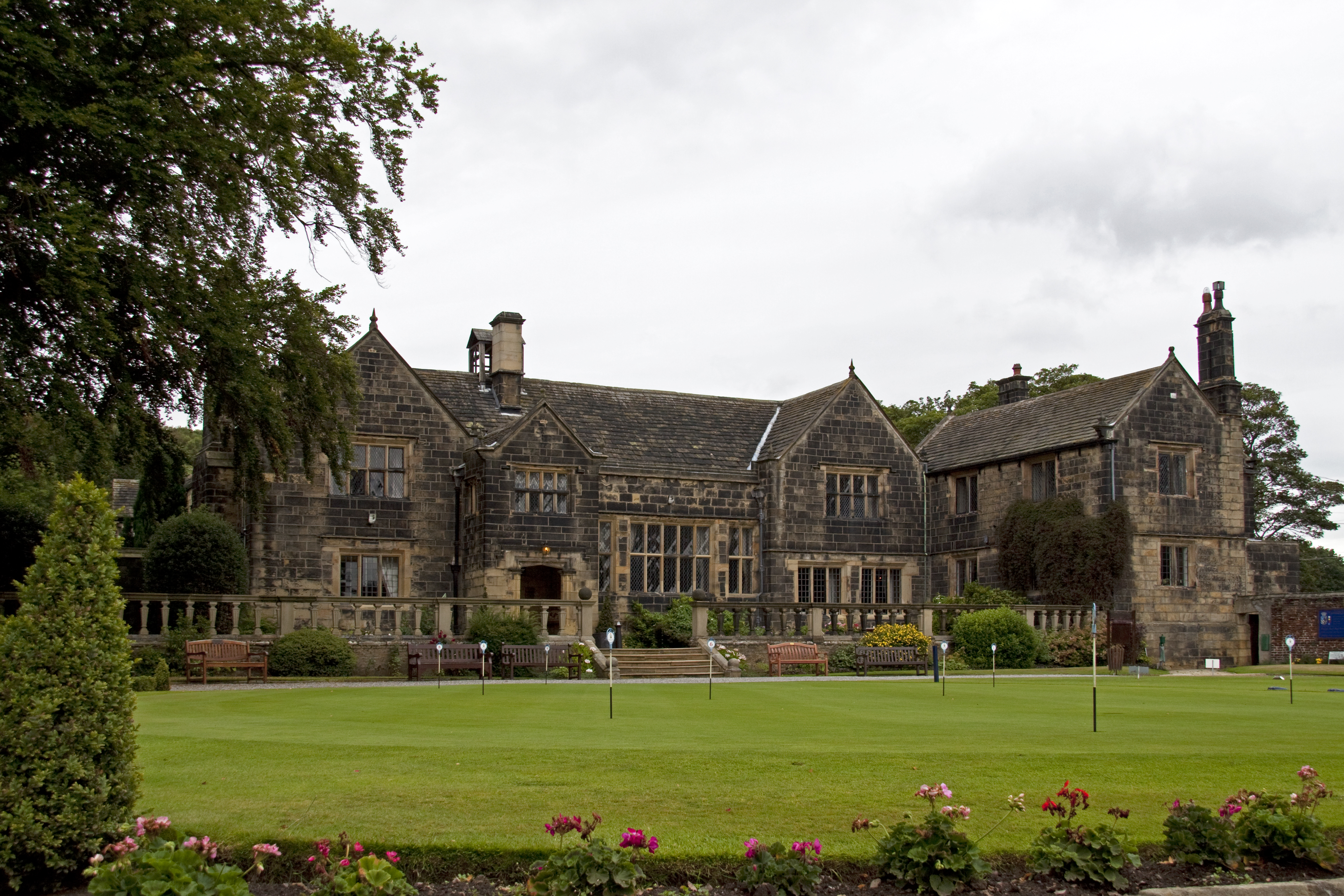
- Interactive map of the Woodsome Hall area

General information
- Type: Country House
- Architectural style: Elizabethan
- Location: Farnley Tyas, Huddersfield, England
- Coordinates: 53.6259°N 1.7289°W
- Owner: Woodsome Hall Golf Club

Design and construction
- Designations: Grade I listed

Woodsome Hall is a 16th-century country house in the parish of Almondbury, near Huddersfield, West Yorkshire, England. It is now the clubhouse of Woodsome Hall Golf Club and a Grade I listed building.

Built in the Elizabethan era as a hall house, Woodsome evolved in stages in the possession of several generations of the local Kaye family. The main hall range is built in two storeys with gabled forward projecting wings and a two storey gabled porch. At the rear of each end are L-shaped extensions forming a courtyard with a fountain.

== History ==
The Woodsome estate belonged in the 13th century to the de Nottons, after which it passed to the Tyas family, who lived there until 1370. It was then granted to Sir William Finchenden, who was responsible for the finch motifs which adorn the building, before coming into the possession of the Kaye family, who occupied the property from 1378 to 1726.

Sir John Kaye was created a baronet in 1642 and the Hall passed down to Sir Arthur Kaye, 3rd Baronet who died with no male heir in 1726, the baronetcy thereby becoming extinct. His only daughter Elizabeth married George Legge, Viscount Lewisham, the heir of the 1st Earl of Dartmouth. Unfortunately Viscount Legge died soon afterwards in 1732, to be succeeded in turn by his eldest son, William Legge, 2nd Earl of Dartmouth. The Earls of Dartmouth's main seats were elsewhere and thus Woodsome became a country retreat and dower house.

The last members of the Legge family to live at Woodsome were Frances, Georgiana and Elizabeth Legge, daughters of the 5th Earl of Dartmouth, who vacated it in 1910. In 1911 the estate was let to Woodsome Hall Golf Club, who then purchased the property and have occupied it ever since.

== See also ==
- Grade I listed buildings in West Yorkshire
- Listed buildings in Kirkburton
