= Myers Wood =

Woodland in Kirkburton, West Yorkshire, England

Coordinates: 53.6088°N 1.7171°W

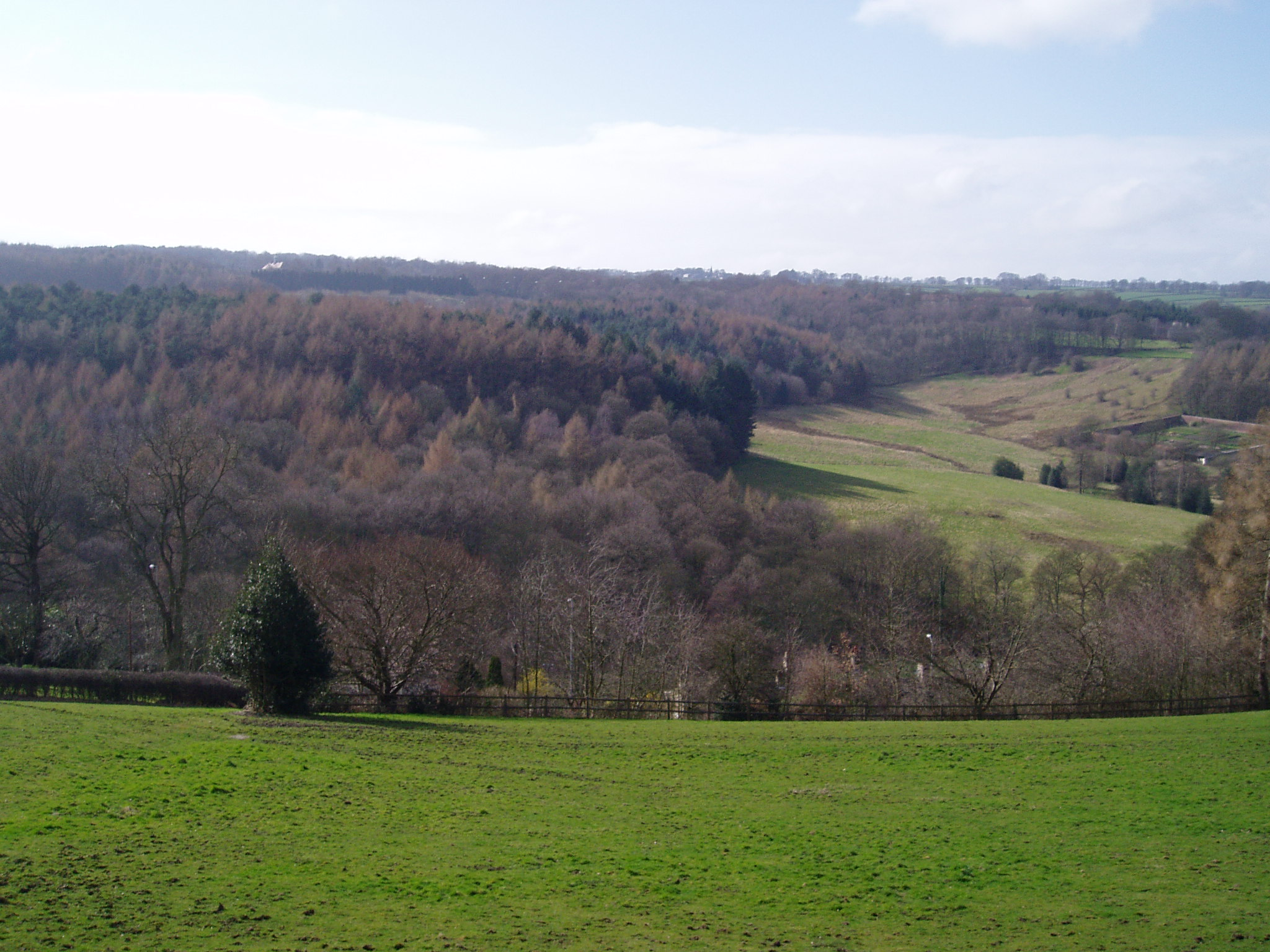
Myers Wood, Kirkburton

Myers Wood is a wooded area in the village of Kirkburton, West Yorkshire, England. It forms part of a heavily forested area to the west of the village, occupying the rise in the valley leading up to Storthes Hall and beyond. It is directly west of the main Penistone Road, opposite Riley. Saville Wood is directly south, close to Thunder Bridge. Local residents consider the wood to be of poor quality due to the absence of woodland management.

The wood is significant for the discovery of an iron-working site dating from the Middle Ages. Archaeological excavations by a team from the University of Bradford uncovered the most complete site in the north of England. The Cistercian monastic iron-working site was in operation from the 12th century to the 14th century, using advanced techniques and water power for smelting and smithing iron. The site is not a tourist feature, there being no formal administration or oversight by a heritage body; however, it is possible to access the site via the footpath that runs through Saville Wood.
