= Thurstonland and Farnley Tyas Urban District =

Abolished urban district of the West Riding of Yorkshire, England

Coordinates: 53.597°N 1.749°W

- Urban District
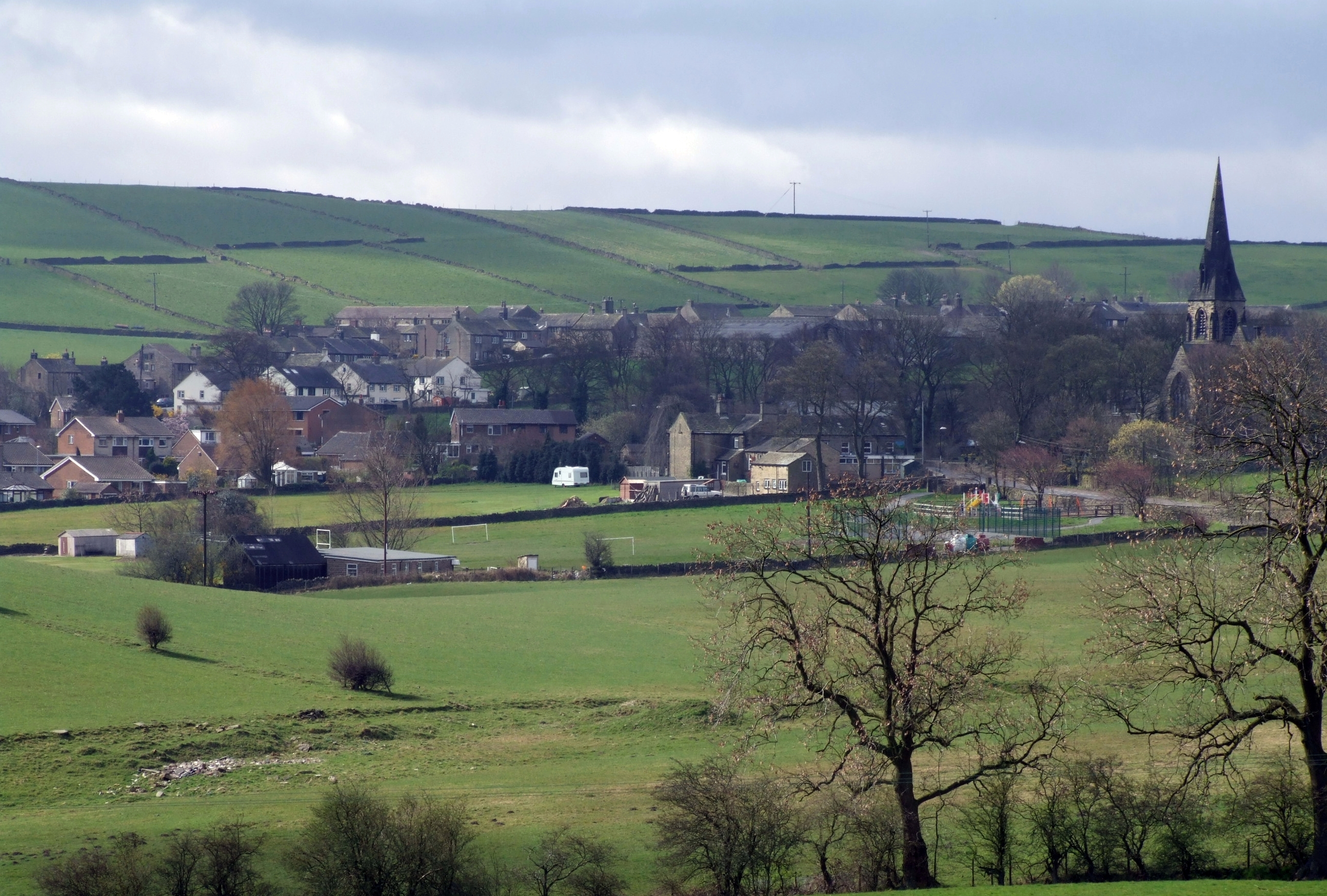
- Population
  - 1931: 3,981
- History
  - Abolished: 1 April 1938
  - Succeeded by: Kirkburton Urban District, Holmfirth Urban District
- Contained within
  - County: West Riding of Yorkshire

Thurstonland and Farnley Tyas was an urban district in the West Riding of Yorkshire from 1925 to 1938.

It was created in 1925 by the merger of the Thurstonland and Farnley Tyas urban districts (both created in 1894). On 1 April 1938 it was abolished, under a County Review Order, with most going to Kirkburton urban district, and part to Holmfirth Urban District. In 1931 the district had a population of 3,981. The area is now part of the Kirklees metropolitan borough in West Yorkshire.
