= Thunder Bridge =

Hamlet in West Yorkshire, England

Coordinates: 53.598954°N 1.716688°W

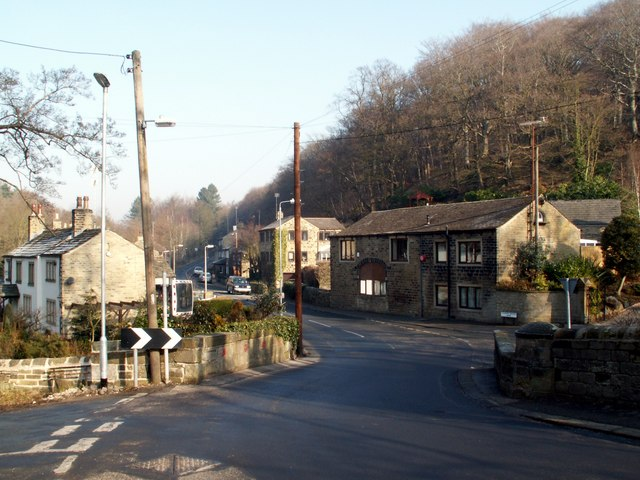

- Location within West Yorkshire
- Civil parish: Kirkburton
- Metropolitan borough: Kirklees
- Metropolitan county: West Yorkshire
- Region: Yorkshire and the Humber
- Country: England
- Sovereign state: United Kingdom
- Post town: HUDDERSFIELD
- Police: West Yorkshire
- Fire: West Yorkshire
- Ambulance: Yorkshire

Thunder Bridge or Thunderbridge is a hamlet and bridge in the civil parish of Kirkburton, in the Kirklees district, in the county of West Yorkshire, England. It is near the A629 road and Stocksmoor railway station. Its post town is Huddersfield. It has a pub called the Woodman Inn. The bridge is a Grade II listed building which is a road bridge over Shepley Dike. Thunder Bridge is a conservation area.

== History ==
Thunder Bridge was also known as "Founder Bridge".

== See also ==
- Listed buildings in Kirkburton
