= Shelley College =

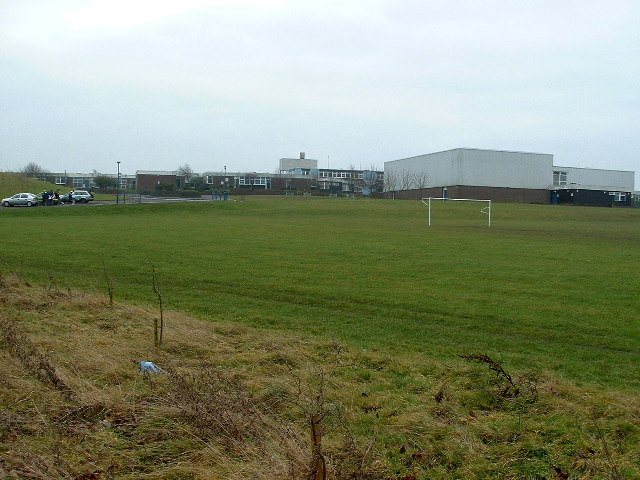

Location
- Huddersfield Road; Shelley; Huddersfield, West Yorkshire, HD8 8NL; England
- 53.59199°N 1.66534°W

Information
- Former name: Shelley High School
- Type: Academy
- Motto: Valuing People, Supporting Personal Best
- Established: 1974
- Local authority: Kirklees
- Trust: SHARE Multi Academy Trust
- Department for Education URN: 137352 Tables
- Ofsted: Reports
- Executive Principal: David Wadsworth
- Associate Principal: Jack Wyatt
- Gender: Coeducational
- Age: 13 to 18
- Website: http://www.shelleycollege.org/

Shelley College (formerly known as Shelley High School) is a coeducational upper school and sixth form on the border between the villages of Shelley and Skelmanthorpe, West Yorkshire, in England. The school gained Academy status in September 2011, as Shelley College – A Specialist Centre for Science. However, as of November 2014, it is no longer a specialist in science.

Unlike most English high schools, pupils join Shelley College at Year 9, aged 13, because there is a middle school system in the surrounding area. The school has two main feeder schools, Kirkburton Middle School, which received a Grade 2 'Good' Ofsted report in April 2015, and Scissett Middle School, which also received a Grade 2 Ofsted report in November 2013.

The school has departments for science and design technology. The sixth form has its own separate block, the Altitude Building, which holds a small café, study room (ICT suite), office and toilets.

In February 2013, the school opened a new dining area and pastoral offices, followed by a new assembly hall and library in May 2013.

The 2013 Ofsted inspection report awarded the school 'Outstanding', an overall grade 1. In 2024, another Ofsted inspection report listed all sectors as 'Outstanding'.

As of June 2018, Shelley College belonged to the expanding SHARE Multi-Academy Trust.

== Notable alumni ==
- Ed Clancy, member of the gold medal-winning men's team pursuit cycling team at the 2008 Beijing Olympics and the 2012 London Olympics; bronze medal winner in the men's omnium event at the 2012 London Olympics
- Lena Headey, actress who played Cersei Lannister in the HBO series Game of Thrones
- Daniel Kitson, Perrier award-winning comedian
- Kate Rusby, folk singer and songwriter
- Jodie Whittaker, actress who appeared in St. Trinians, Venus and Broadchurch. Played the 13th Doctor in the BBC series Doctor Who
- Aaliyah Powell, GB taekwondo athlete. Won a bronze medal in bantamweight at the 2019 World Taekwondo Championships.
- Simon Charlton, Ex Premier League footballer who most notably played for Huddersfield Town, Southampton and Birmingham City.
