= Shelley, West Yorkshire =

Village in West Yorkshire, England

Coordinates: 53.596°N 1.689°W

Shelley
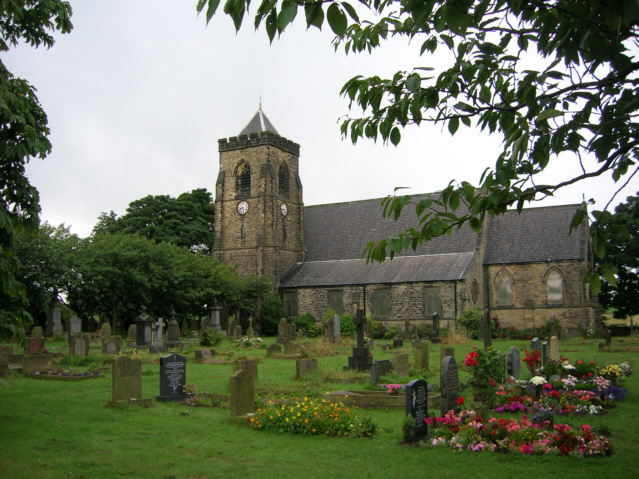
- Emmanuel Church, Shelley. Designed by Henry Mallinson and William Swinden Barber 1865–1869

- Location within West Yorkshire
- Population: 3,059 (2001 census)
- Civil parish: Kirkburton
- Metropolitan borough: Kirklees
- Metropolitan county: West Yorkshire
- Region: Yorkshire and the Humber
- Country: England
- Sovereign state: United Kingdom

Shelley is a village in the civil parish of Kirkburton, in the Kirklees district, in the county of West Yorkshire, England. The village is 3 miles (5 km) north of Holmfirth and 6 miles (10 km) south-east of Huddersfield.

The name Shelley derives from the Old English scelflēah meaning 'wood on a shelf of land'.

== Community ==
Road transport links are the A629 and B6116 roads. Within the village is Shelley Hall, which dates to the 17th century, and is a Grade II* listed building.

The village has three public houses: The Rising Sun, The Flying Ferret (formerly Oddfellows) and Shelley Sports and Social Club. It also has a Morrisons Daily convenience store, fish and chip shop, garden centre and an ice cream parlour. The Emley Moor TV mast lies to the northeast of the village.

The village has a community association which meets in its Village Hall.

Shelley won the Calor Yorkshire and Northern Village of the Year award in 2004, following winning the earlier round for 'Yorkshire's small village of the year' promoted by the Yorkshire Rural Community Council.

Barncliffe Mill at Brookhouse, former home to Shelley Textiles, became the headquarters for Whitley Willows Ltd after the closure of the Lepton mill.

== Governance ==
Shelley was a chapelry in the parish of Kirkburton, and from 1866 it was a civil parish, on 1 April 1938 the parish was abolished and merged with Kirkburton. In 1931 the parish had a population of 1566.

Shelley had a population of 3,059 according to the 2001 census. It is part of the Kirkburton ward of Kirklees Council.

== Religion ==
Shelley Methodist Church, off Far Bank at the west of the village, is a Grade II listed building dating to 1785–6, originally a Methodist New Connexion chapel. The Church of England's Gothic Revival Church of Emmanuel is on Huddersfield Road at the east of the village. Built in 1868, it is a Grade II listed building. A United Reformed Church on Water Lane is closed.

== Education ==
Shelley has a primary school known as Shelley First School for children from Reception to Year 5. A pre-school and out-of-school club known as The Cabin is situated in a prefabricated building next to the school.

Shelley College at the east end of the parish near the border with the parish of Denby Dale is for pupils from Kirkburton, Denby Dale and Scissett. Shelley High School, changed to Shelley College when it attained specialist status in science. The actresses Lena Headey and Jodie Whittaker attended Shelley College.

== Notable people ==
- Judith Armitage FRS (born 1951 in Shelley) molecular and cellular biochemist

== Sport ==
Shelley also has a community football club, based at Storthes Hall Park which competes in the North West Counties Football League.

== See also ==
- Listed buildings in Kirkburton
