= Birdsedge =

Village in West Yorkshire, England

Coordinates: 53.568°N 1.697°W

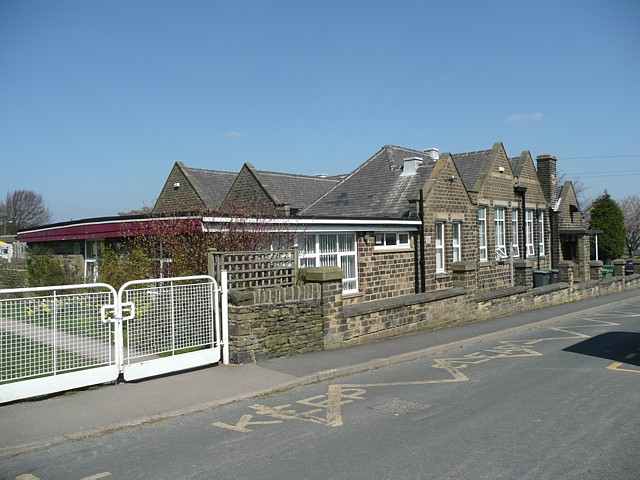
- Primary school

- Location within West Yorkshire
- Population: 350
  - London: 155 mi (249 km) SE
- Metropolitan borough: Kirklees
- Metropolitan county: West Yorkshire
- Region: Yorkshire and the Humber
- Country: England
- Sovereign state: United Kingdom
- Post town: HUDDERSFIELD
- Postcode district: HD8
- Dialling code: 01484
- Police: West Yorkshire
- Fire: West Yorkshire
- Ambulance: Yorkshire
- UK Parliament: Ossett and Denby Dale

Birdsedge (or Birds Edge) is a small village in the borough of Kirklees in West Yorkshire, England, on the edge of Yorkshire's Pennine Hills, standing just below 1,000 feet (305 m) above sea level. It is approximately 6 miles (10 km) south-east from Huddersfield and about 4 miles (6 km) north-west from Penistone, between the villages of Shepley and Upper Cumberworth and is linked with the neighbouring hamlet of High Flatts, a former Quaker settlement (and still home to a Friends Meeting House).

Though originally an area of upland farms, woollen weaving and stone quarries, it is now a dormitory village for nearby towns and cities of Huddersfield, Barnsley, Sheffield, Wakefield and Leeds. Although the village has no industry it hosts Birdsedge First School, Birdsedge Wesleyan Reform Church and Birdsedge Village Hall. A mill operates in the village, part of the Z Hinchliffe mill complex located in the nearby village of Denby Dale.

== Name ==
Multiple spellings of the village's name exist. Local residents tend to spell it as Birdsedge, while Kirklees (local authorities) spell it as 'Birds Edge'. Until the 1980s, the road sign at the north end of the village proclaimed Birds Edge, while approaching from the south, although there was no village sign, the road sign on the A629 proclaimed Birdsedge. In the village Post Office's guide: 'Postal Addresses and Index to Postcode Directories' of May 1983, it is listed as Birdsedge.

== History ==
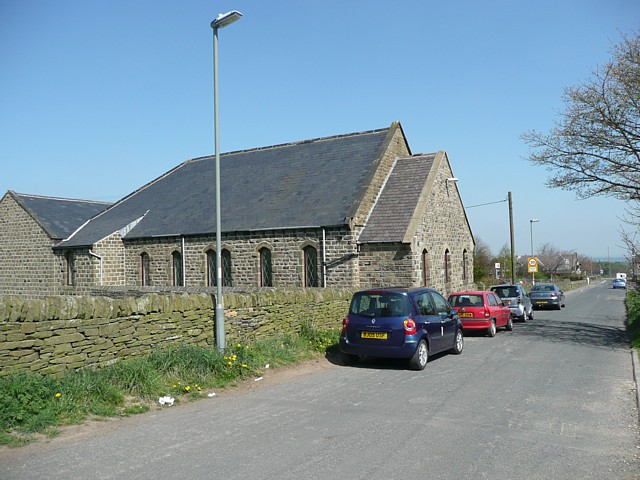
Methodist chapel

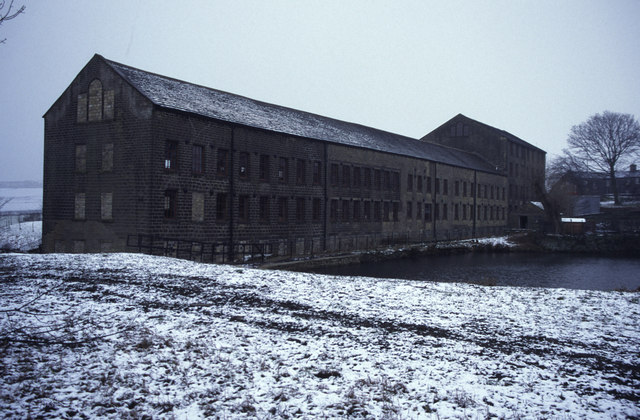
19th century factory building and mill pond

Until the 17th century, the village was mostly isolated farms. A group of Quakers founded a Meeting in High Flatts, renovating a barn and building several houses nearby. The Dickinsons lived in the area of High Flatts and Ingbirchworth until around 1900, when some residents moved to nearby towns to find work outside of the textile trade. The Dickinson family prospered and the community developed under the Quakers for 200 years.

Around 1880, James Dickinson (born 1867), son of Joseph Dickinson (born 1837), moved to Brampton Bierlow to work in the coal mines and farms. By that time, the mill at Birdsedge was a major employer in the area. The majority of 19th century stone cottages housed workers who had moved from outlying areas to find employment. By this time several shops, including a post office, and two or three pubs had opened. The school (then in the building that became the village hall) was founded in the 1870s by the Quakers. It was replaced by the New Council School (now the First School) in 1911.

Today the village has about 170 houses and a population of 350.

== Culture ==
Birdsedge hosts an annual festival on the first Saturday in July, featuring family entertainment, music and dance performances from the national and international folk scene. It has hosted folk concerts in the Village Hall since 1983.
