= Lepton, West Yorkshire =

Suburb of Huddersfield, West Yorkshire, England

Coordinates: 53.633°N 1.695°W

Lepton
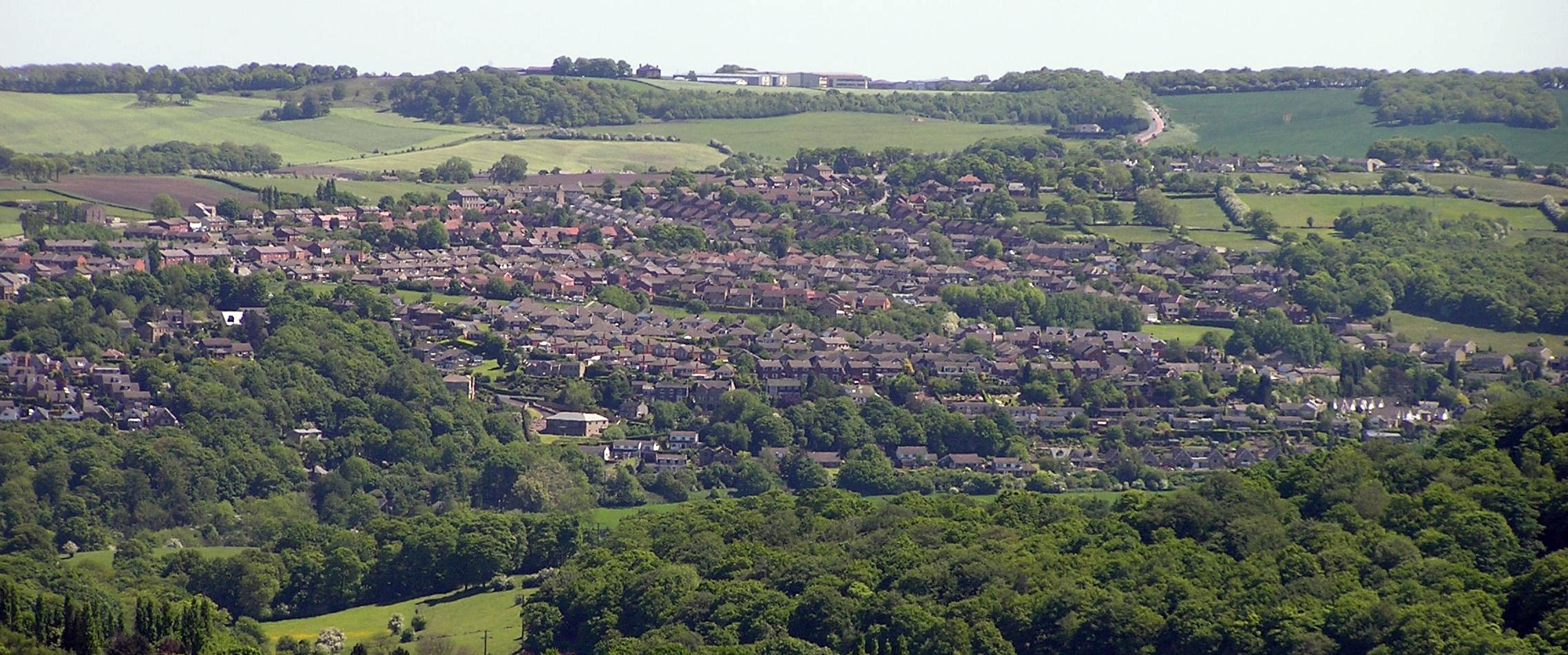
- View of Lepton from Castle Hill

- Location within West Yorkshire
- Population: 4,947
- Civil parish: Kirkburton
- Metropolitan borough: Kirklees
- Metropolitan county: West Yorkshire
- Region: Yorkshire and the Humber
- Country: England
- Sovereign state: United Kingdom
- Police: West Yorkshire
- Fire: West Yorkshire
- Ambulance: Yorkshire

Lepton is a village in Huddersfield, in the civil parish of Kirkburton, in the Kirklees district of West Yorkshire, England. It is 4.25 miles (7 km) to the east of Huddersfield on the A642 road, 120 metres (390 ft) above the town centre directly north of Lepton Great Wood.

== History ==
The name "Lepton" may mean 'leap farm/settlement'. Lepton was recorded in the Domesday Book of 1086 as Leptone. Lepton was formerly a township in the parish of Kirkheaton, in 1866 Lepton became a separate civil parish, in 1894 Lepton became an urban district. On 1 April 1938 the district was abolished and merged with Kirkburton Urban District, and the parish was abolished and merged with Kirkburton. In 1931 the parish had a population of 3,323.

== Notable aspects of Lepton ==
Some of the more notable aspects of the village include;

- St John's Church. See 'External Links' below for a survey of burials in the churchyard (unfinished) and an image of a Wayside Cross.
- Lepton Church of England School
- Rowley Lane Junior, Infant and Nursery School
- The football and cricket club, Lepton Highlanders. The cricket team play in the Huddersfield Cricket League. The football team play in the Yorkshire Amateur Football League

== See also ==
- Listed buildings in Kirkburton
