= Stocksmoor railway station =

Railway station in West Yorkshire, England

Stocksmoor
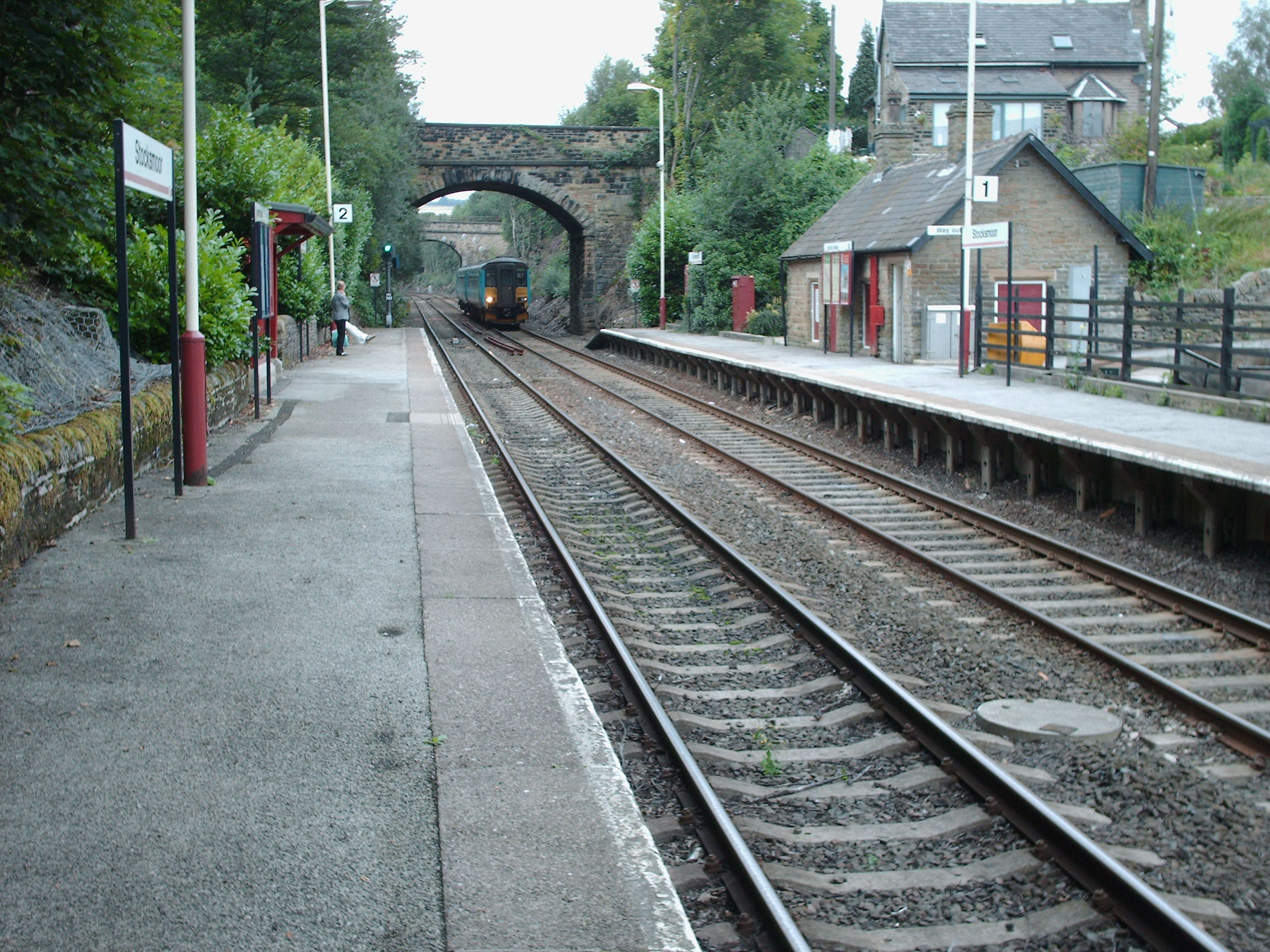
- The view from platform 2

General information
- Location: Stocksmoor, Kirklees; England
- Coordinates: 53.5942°N 1.7236°W
- Grid reference: SE183108
- Manager: Northern Trains
- Transit authority: West Yorkshire (Metro)
- Platforms: 2

Other information
- Station code: SSM
- Fare zone: 5
- Classification: DfT category F2

History
- Opened: 1 July 1850; 176 years ago

Passengers
- 2021/22: ▲19,480
- 2022/23: ▲21,730
- 2023/24: ▲22,192
- 2024/25: ▲22,892
- 2025/26: ▼22,020
Location
Notes
- Passenger statistics from the Office of Rail and Road

Stocksmoor railway station serves the village of Stocksmoor near Huddersfield in West Yorkshire, England.

The station is 6.25 miles (10 km) from Huddersfield on the Penistone Line operated by Northern.

Most of the Penistone Line is single track between Huddersfield and Barnsley (and has been since 1989). However, Stocksmoor marks the first point (for Sheffield-bound trains) or last point (for Huddersfield-bound trains) where there is dual running track (the passing loop extends as far south as the next station at Shepley and most trains are scheduled to pass each other on this section).

== Facilities ==
Like the other stations on this route, Stocksmoor is unstaffed (and has been so since 1966, when the route was reprieved from closure). It has shelters on each platform; the old station waiting room on the southbound side still stands, though it is not in rail use. Train running information is provided by timetable posters and by telephone, though operator Northern is funding the provision of digital display screens here in 2016 as well as Brockholes, Berry Brow and Lockwood. Step-free access is available to both platforms via ramps from the nearby road.

== Services ==
On Mondays to Saturdays, trains operate hourly from Stocksmoor in each direction, towards Huddersfield and to Barnsley and Sheffield. The Sunday frequency is also hourly, but starts later in the morning.

Preceding station	National Rail	Following station
Shepley	Northern Trains Penistone Line	Brockholes
