= Castle Hill, Huddersfield =

Ancient monument in West Yorkshire, England

Coordinates: 53.62232°N 1.77167°W

Castle Hill is a scheduled ancient monument in Almondbury overlooking Huddersfield in the Metropolitan Borough of Kirklees, West Yorkshire, England. The hilltop has been settled for at least 4,000 years. The scheduled monument comprises the remains of a late-Bronze Age or early Iron Age univallate hillfort with a single raised bank, a later Iron Age multivallate hillfort, a 12th-century motte-and-bailey castle, and the site of a deserted medieval village. The grade II listed Victoria Tower on the summit of Castle Hill is by far the most conspicuous landmark in Huddersfield. The hill has been a place of recreation for hundreds of years and the easily discernible remains of past occupation have made it a subject for legend, speculation and scientific study. It is located on UK Maps at grid reference SE152140.

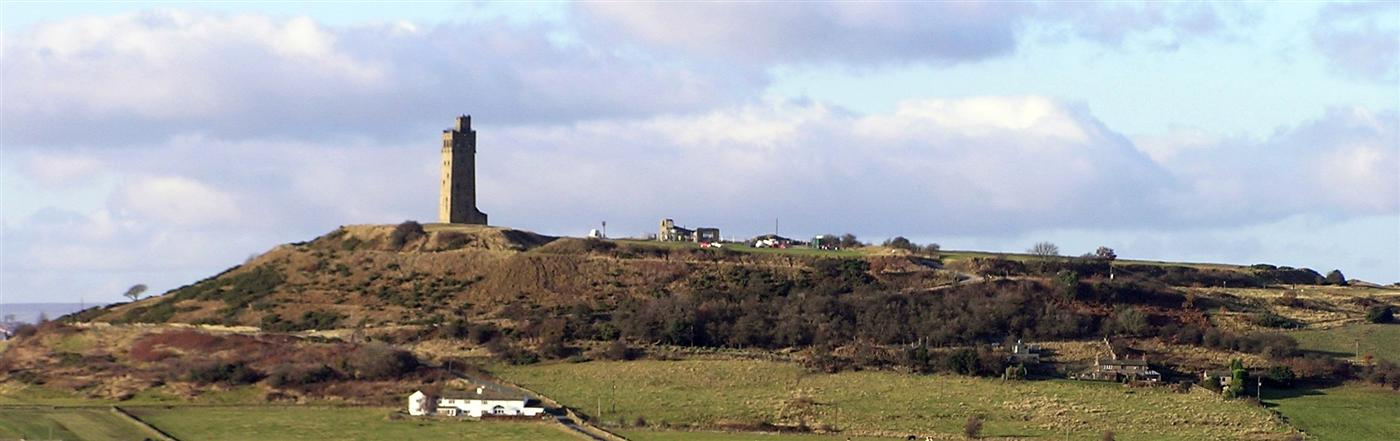
Castle Hill and the Victoria Tower viewed from Farnley Tyas

== Geology ==
The hill owes its shape to an outlying cap of hard Grenoside sandstone, which has protected the softer stone beneath from erosion. The slopes below Castle Hill are formed from alternating deposits of shale and harder sandstones and form a series of slopes and benches. Five coal seams lie within the shales of the lower slopes, some of which have been worked along the hillside, by adits and shafts. Workings are visible in several places and there is also evidence of old quarries that have been infilled.

== History ==
=== Early history ===
The first people to visit Castle Hill were probably hunters and gatherers of the Mesolithic age, camping amongst the forests which at that time covered the land. In the Neolithic and Bronze Age, there appears to have been widespread travel or trade along the river valleys connecting the Yorkshire Wolds, the Peak District and the Mersey and Ribble estuaries. This is shown by various characteristic types of stone and bronze tools in a place far from their points of origin. The hillfort was constructed in the early Iron Age, around 555 BC taking up the whole hilltop. Modifications were made around 43 AD to improve the defences, probably in response to the threat from the Roman invaders.

Excavations on part of the hillfort in 1970 demonstrated that Castle Hill had at some stage suffered from a severe episode of burning. Vitrified forts such as Castle Hill are rarely found in England, and are more usual in Scotland.

The banks and ditches that remain are more likely to be the result of recutting and other alterations carried out during the Middle Ages, and modified by centuries of erosion. After the Norman Conquest of 1066, Almondbury became part of the Honour of Pontefract, which was held by the de Laci family. They established a small castle on the hill. It is mentioned in a charter of King Stephen to Henry de Laci of about 1142 to 1154. Archaeological excavation has provided a wooden stake, radiocarbon-dated to the late 1140s, and a coin of about 1160. It can be assumed that the castle was complete and occupied by the 1140s.

In the early 14th century there was an attempt to found a settlement in the lower bailey, and possibly elsewhere on the hill. Aerial photography revealed a central roadway flanked by regularly laid-out plots. It was probably abandoned by the 1340s, although memory of it may have lingered, since the map of Almondbury drawn up in 1634 marks the hill as the site of a town. After the end of the Middle Ages, Castle Hill remained uninhabited until the early 19th century. Its prominent position made it an ideal site for a warning beacon, as part of a network of such beacons on other prominent hills all over the country, spreading out in lines from the coast.

=== Modern history ===
Castle Hill's flat top was a venue for large political, religious, and other meetings. Chartist rallies were held at least four times, in 1843 and 1848. During the great weavers’ strike of 1883 a rally of between two and three thousand people braved bitter weather to listen to speeches by union leaders. A tavern to cater for pleasure-seekers was built on the hill in about 1810–11. A bowling green was formerly situated to the south of it. Other pursuits recorded there included bare-knuckled prize fights, dogfights and cockfights.

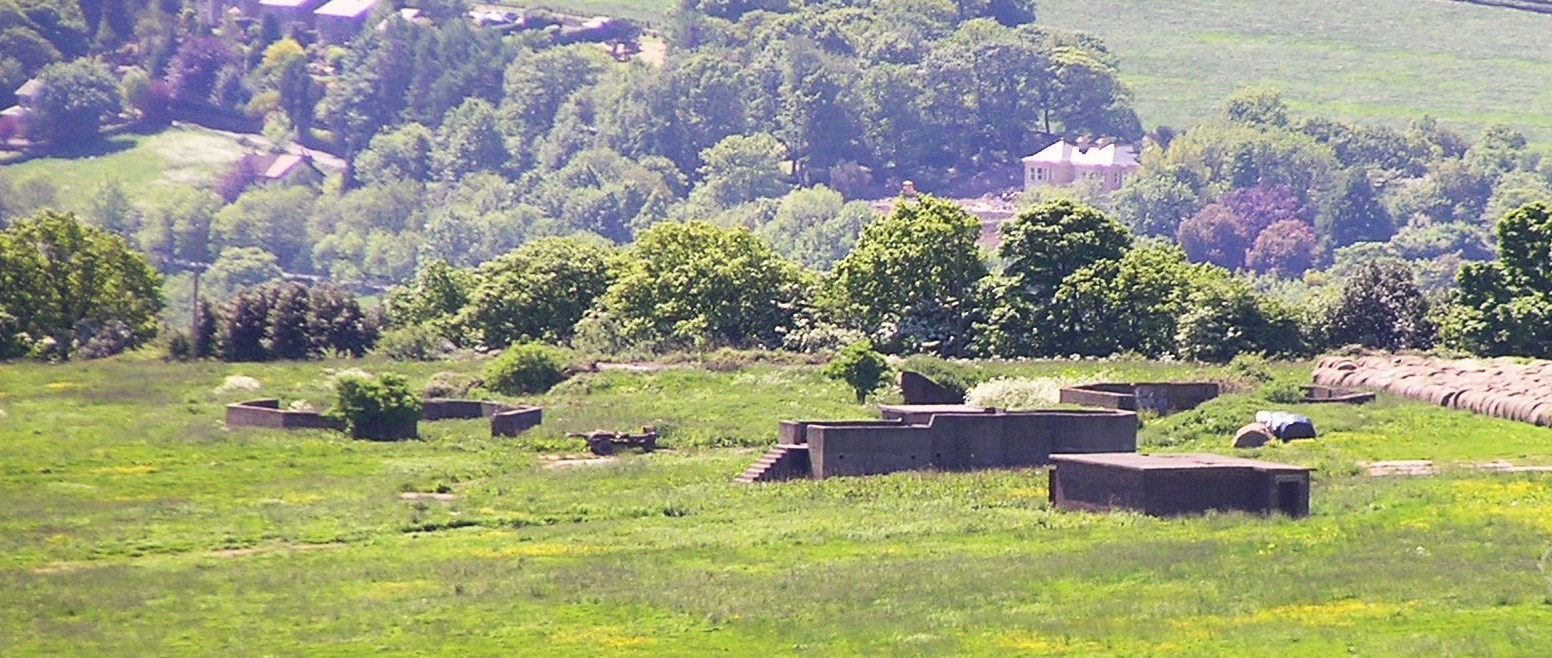
Remains of a Second World War Anti-Aircraft battery at Castle Hill

The Thandi Partnership bought the public house on land leased from Kirklees Borough Council and applied for planning permission to renovate it. After breaching planning conditions, the pub was demolished. Subsequent plans to rebuild it have been rejected.

An anti-aircraft battery was built near the south-east end of the hill and a range finder is located at the north side of the outer bailey, the remains of which may be seen, and pieces of high-explosive shell casings are occasionally picked up in the adjacent fields.

Today the hill retains the remnants of all its past uses, and is a popular site for local people and tourists. Overhead electricity cables were relocated below ground in 2006 to enable kite users to make use of the hilltop winds.

== Victoria Tower ==
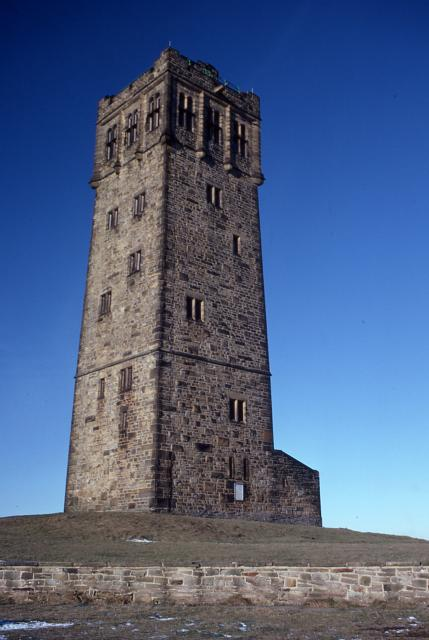
Victoria Tower at Castle Hill

By 1897 Queen Victoria had reigned over the British Empire for sixty years, longer than any other monarch. A permanent memorial of this event was planned in the form of a tower perched on the hill overlooking the town of Huddersfield. Despite some difficulty raising the money required, the tower was opened by the Earl of Scarborough on 24 June 1899. Although often referred to as the Jubilee Tower, the correct name is the Victoria Tower. Designed by Isaac Jones of London, it was built by the firm of Ben Graham and Sons of Folly Hall, using stone from Crosland Hill. It cost £3,298, and was 106 feet (32.3 m) high, which, added to the height of the hill itself, made the top 1,000 feet (305 m) above sea level.

During the Second World War it was suggested that the tower should be demolished to prevent it from being used as a navigation aid by German bombers. A few bombs were dropped near the tower in 1940 and 1941, but were probably just randomly jettisoned.

The tower is a Grade-II-designated Listed Building.
