= A629 road =

Primary 'A' road in Yorkshire, England

A629

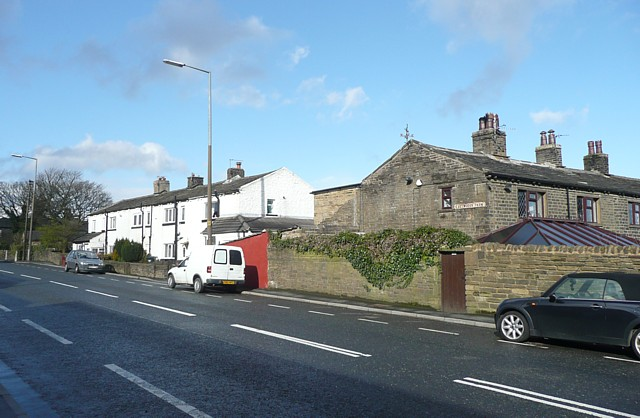
- The A629 Keighley Road, in the village of Illingworth

Major junctions
- North end: A65/A59 Skipton
- A59; A65 A6131 A6068 A6034 A650 A6035 A6033 A644; A58 A646 A6026 A6025 A643; A62 A642 A635 A628 A616; A61 A6135; M1 A6109 A6123 A630
- South end: Rotherham

Location
- Country: United Kingdom

Road network
- Roads in the United Kingdom; Motorways; A and B road zones
← A628	→ A630

The A629 road is an intra-Yorkshire road that runs from Skipton to Rotherham through Keighley, Halifax, Huddersfield and Chapeltown in Yorkshire, England. The road runs through North, West and South Yorkshire, but before 1974, the entire length of the road was wholly within the boundaries of the West Riding of Yorkshire. It is designated as a primary route through most of its length.

The road is part of the intended Doncaster to Kendal Trunk Route which was designated as a trunk road in 1946.

Parts of the road are designated as a High Load Route by the UK Government although the section through Burncross to Chapeltown is designated as B road (B6546) because of a weight restriction.

== Route ==
The very northern section of the route partially runs over the route of the Keighley and Kendal Turnpike. Most parts have been bypassed such as the section between Snaygill to the south of Skipton onto the A65/A59 roundabout which opened in 1981. Southern parts of the route were formerly the Huddersfield to Penistone Turnpike and the Halifax to Sheffield Turnpike.

Along with the A65 and the A650, the A629 is part of the intended Doncaster to Kendal trunk route (Note: The Doncaster to Kendal Trunk Route was instituted in 1946 and was to have used the A638, A650, A6035, A629, A59 and the A65.) which was meant to provide a through route between the two towns and cut across the Aire Gap. As the section of the A629 between Skipton and Keighley is designated as a trunk route, it is maintained by the Highways Agency as opposed to the local authorities. Additionally; the section between Kildwick roundabout and Keighley is designated as a Highways Agency High Route (IE one that high loads should take to avoid bridges).

From the north the route starts at the A65/A59 roundabout to the northeast of Skipton and heads southwards through the Aire Valley bypassing Skipton, Farnhill and Kildwick. Just before the Kildwick level crossing, the road takes a bypass around Eastburn and Steeton on a dual carriageway that was opened in 1989. At Keighley, the A629 diverts through the town whilst Aire Valley traffic takes the A650. Through and beyond Keighley to Halifax, the road is a single carriageway.

After going through Keighley town centre, the road heads due south but up onto the high ground through Ingrow, Cross Roads and Denholme. After Denholme the road crosses over into Calderdale and goes through Illingworth, Ovenden and Halifax. The section of road between Halifax and Huddersfield is the main link between the two towns and incorporates a bad junction with the A6026 in Salterhebble and the Elland bypass that leads up towards a junction with the M62 Motorway. The bypass at Elland is being widened to four lanes and is expected to reduce journey times between the M62 and Halifax by 30% when opened in 2024. Through Huddersfield the road is in a multiplex with the ring road and then heads off south east past Shepley and Penistone.

The route is broken on Burncross road through Chapeltown due to a 7.5-tonne (8.3-ton) weight restriction on the road, but was traditionally part of the A629. Heavy goods traffic is expected to divert onto the A61 north, use the M1 motorway south and then pick up the A629 at junction 35 for Chapeltown to access the rest of the route towards Rotherham.

== Incidents and safety ==
In May 2011, a section of the southbound Elland bypass was closed after boulders, remnants of a quarry that the bypass was built next to, came crashing down into the road.

According to the Eurorap safety rating, the A629 is a Medium High-Risk Road between Skipton and Huddersfield and a Medium-Risk Road between Huddersfield and Rotherham.

In January 2017, a man was shot by police on the side of the A629 southbound just by junction 24 of the M62 Motorway.(although this wasn't technically the A629 but a spur connecting the A629 to the motorway network) The police announced it was a pre-planned operation as they had credible information that the man was carrying a gun.

== Congestion ==
As the road passes through the major conurbations of Keighley, Halifax, Huddersfield and Rotherham, it is prone to some congestion especially during the morning and evening peak periods. The junction of the road with the A6026 and the B6112 in Saltherhebble, regularly sees queuing traffic for over a 1-mile (1.6 km) southbound that takes between 12 and 15 minutes to get through.

Kirklees Council have previously acknowledged that the A629 is one of the busiest roads in Kirklees. In 2021 the complex junction between the A6026, the B6112 and the A629 just south of Salterhebble nr Halifax, has been expanded by 250 metres. This has been done by adding a new junction south of the old junction on the A629 which connects, via a bridge over the Calder and Hebble Navigation canal, to a new roundabout on the B6112 Stainland Road. This provides more space to separate the queues, and removes one conflict from the old A6026-B6112 junction which should result in better flows.
