= Farnley Tyas =

Village in West Yorkshire, England

Coordinates: 53.611°N 1.751°W

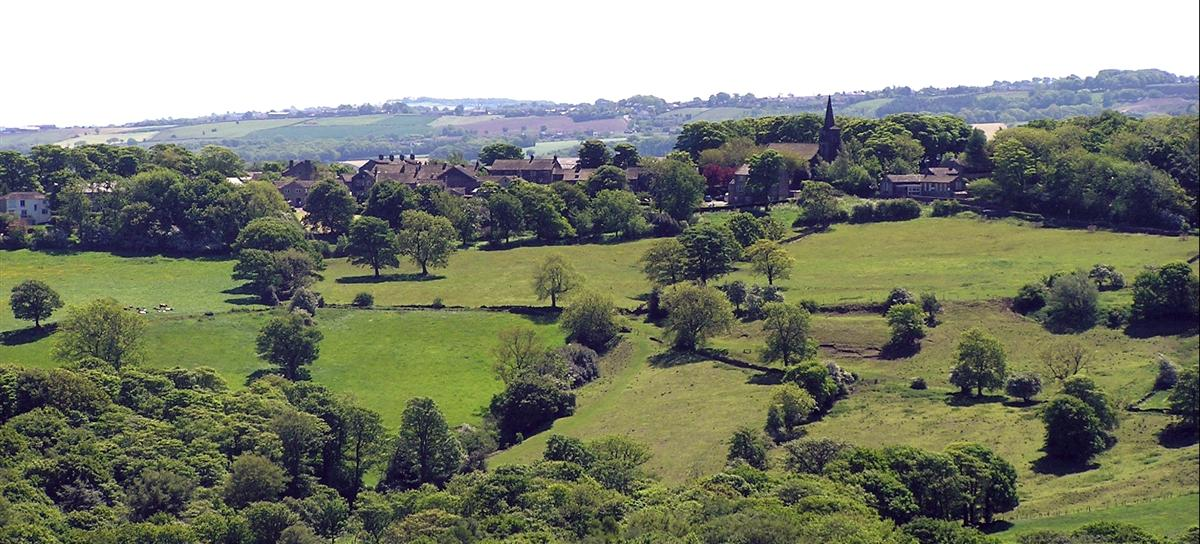
- Farnley Tyas view from Castle Hill, Huddersfield

- Location within West Yorkshire
- Civil parish: Kirkburton
- Metropolitan borough: Kirklees
- Metropolitan county: West Yorkshire
- Region: Yorkshire and the Humber
- Country: England
- Sovereign state: United Kingdom
- Post town: HUDDERSFIELD
- Dialling code: 01484
- Police: West Yorkshire
- Fire: West Yorkshire
- Ambulance: Yorkshire
- UK Parliament: Ossett and Denby Dale

Farnley Tyas is a village in the parish of Kirkburton, in the Kirklees district, in the county of West Yorkshire, England 3 miles (4.8 km) south east of Huddersfield. It is located on a hilltop between Almondbury, Castle Hill, Thurstonland and Honley. It is mostly rural and farmland with private housing and some local authority social housing. In 1921 the parish had a population of 486.

The village has a public house, the Golden Cock Inn, a First School catering for around 50 children aged from four to ten years old, a bowling club and a small sports field. St Lucius' Church, along with All Hallows' and St Michael and St Helen's Churches in Almondbury form the Parish of Almondbury with Farnley Tyas.

== History ==
The settlement was mentioned in the Domesday Book of 1086 as Fereleia. Tyas is the name of the le Tyeis family who held land in the neighbourhood from the 13th century.

Extract from Pigot & Co's National Commercial Directory, 1834

- FARNLEY TYAS is a township, in the same parish as Honley and Crossland, about three miles from Huddersfield and two from Honley. There are but few manufacturing establishments in this township, and, divested of these, it is a place of little importance. The Earl of Dartmouth contributes £30 annually for the support of a school, in which thirty children are instructed. The population of this township has latterly declined: in 1821 it contained 900 inhabitants, and in 1831, 849.

== Governance ==
Farnley Tyas was a township and chapelry in the parish of Almondbury. In 1866 Farnley Tyas became a civil parish and in 1894, an urban district. The urban district was merged with Thurstonland urban district in 1925 but Farnley Tyas and Thurstonland Urban District was abolished in 1938 under a County Review Order, with most of the district merging into the Kirkburton urban district and the rest into the Holmfirth urban district.

== Events ==
The Honley Agricultural Show, which is held every July, has used farmland alongside Moor Lane as venues for recent shows.

== See also ==
- Listed buildings in Kirkburton
