= Church of St Thomas, Thurstonland =

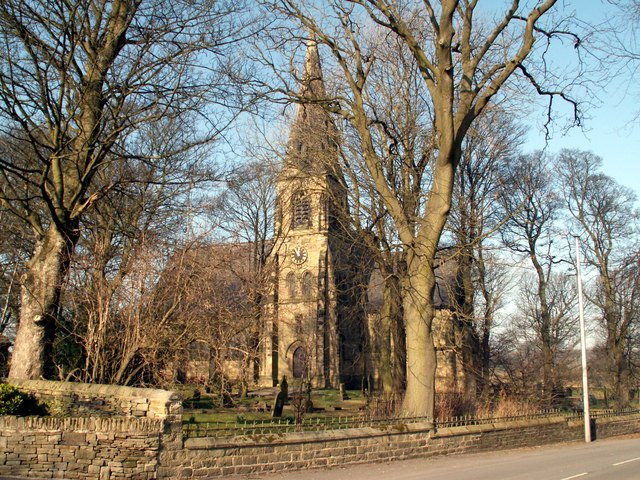
- St Thomas in 2008

- Location in West Yorkshire
- 53°35′35″N 1°45′02″W
- OS grid reference: SE 166108
- Location: Marsh Hall Lane, Thurstonland, West Yorkshire, HD4 6XD
- Country: England
- Denomination: Anglican
- Website: A Church Near You: St Thomas Thurstonland

History
- Consecrated: 3 October 1870

Architecture
- Heritage designation: Grade II listed, #1135375
- Architect(s): Mallinson and Barber
- Architectural type: Parish church
- Style: Gothic Revival, Arts and Crafts
- Groundbreaking: 1869
- Completed: 1870
- Construction cost: £3,000

Specifications
- Capacity: designed for 385

Administration
- Diocese: Anglican Diocese of Leeds
- Archdeaconry: Halifax 401
- Deanery: Kirkburton 40107
- Parish: St Thomas Thurstonland

Clergy
- Vicar: Revd Canon J. Sean Robertshaw

The Church of St Thomas, Thurstonland, West Yorkshire, England, is an Anglican church. It is an Arts and Crafts building in Gothic Revival style, designed by James Mallinson and William Swinden Barber, and completed in 1870. The building was funded by William Legge, 5th Earl of Dartmouth, and it was consecrated by Robert Bickersteth, Bishop of Ripon. The total height of the tower and spire is 109 feet (33 m), and the nave contains an arch-braced hammerbeam roof.

The first incumbent of the parish to use this building was Rev. Robert Boyle Thompson, an evangelical missionary who had already done "great work" in the slums of Seven Dials when he was granted the living of Thurstonland at the age of 28 years.

== Architects and artisans ==
The building was designed between 1867 and 1870 by Mallinson & Barber, however it was Barber who closely supervised the building work, so it can be understood that Barber was largely responsible for the plans. The ground plan dated March 1867 and an undated sketch by the architects of William Butterfield's St John the Evangelist, Birkby, are held at West Yorkshire Archive Service. It is possible that Butterfield's 1853 Birkby church may have partially inspired or informed this design.

The clerk of the works in 1869 was Leonard North of Kirkburton, followed by Thomas Elliott of Bradford in 1870. George Pollard of Huddersfield was the mason, Joah Swallow of Hepworth was joiner, and the plumber was Lockwood of Honley. The slaters were Goodwin & Sons of Huddersfield, the plasterer was Alfred Jessop of Shepley, and the painter was Brighouse of Huddersfield. The heating apparatus was installed by Thornton of Huddersfield.

== History ==
By 1869 three new churches had already been built in the Kirkburton parish due to the efforts of its vicar Rev. Richard Collins (1794–1882), but there was still just an inadequate chapel-room in Thurstonland. This was originally a dissenters' chapel built in 1810 and used as a chapel of ease for Kirkburton from 1834 to 1870. Around 1850 there was an unsuccessful local attempt to raise funds for a new church; a second attempt in 1867–1868 came to fruition.

The scattered population of this village, which was soon to become a parish in its own right, consisted of about 1,200 persons of "limited means", engaged in agricultural and manufacturing trades, so the congregation could not fund a new church. The Church of England therefore appealed to its richer members, so that Mr J.F. Winterbottom (1800–1868) of Eastwood Hey, Berkshire, bequeathed the one-acre site. The building was funded by William Legge, Earl of Dartmouth, C.H. Bill, Colonel Brooke of Honley, J. Hirst JP, Colonel Bradbury and others, including ladies who organised a bazaar. Colonel Brooke was treasurer. Local people had raised £100 and, being unable to assist further with funding, had offered voluntary manual labour; they levelled the ground by hand. At the consecration it was mentioned by Rev. Richard Collins that funds were being raised for a new vicarage at Thurstonland.

=== Foundation stone ceremony ===
The foundation stone was laid at 1.30 pm on Monday 26 July 1869. A large crowd gathered at the site, so that the area reserved for the ceremony had to be roped off. Countess Augusta of Dartmouth and Rev. Richard Collins, vicar of Kirkburton, led the procession, followed by the Earl of Dartmouth and the Rev. R.B. Thompson who was to be the first incumbent of Thurstonland Church. Then came more than 20 clergymen, churchwardens and a dozen or more VIPs who all crowded into the enclosure. Among the VIPs were Lieutenant-Colonel Bradbury JP, William Brooke JP, Captain Legge, Adjutant Legge, Major Brooke, George Wood Jenkinson (1838–1898) the Thurstonland churchwarden, and W.S. Barber the architect. In the newspaper reports, James Mallinson is not mentioned as being present. The choir, the band, the Sunday School children and the spectators arranged themselves outside the ropes.

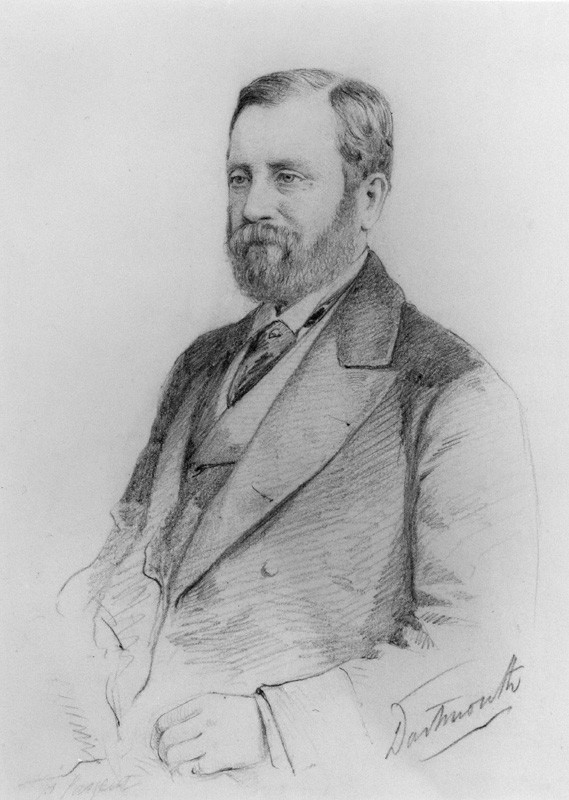
William Legge, 5th Earl of Dartmouth who laid the foundation stone

The audience sang a hymn, This stone to Thee in faith we lay, while an inscribed silver trowel was presented to the Earl of Dartmouth. The earl spread the mortar for the cornerstone. This cornerstone contained a cavity, and inside was a bottle containing "various documents related to the laying of the stone." The hole was sealed with an inscribed brass plate, which said:

Glory be to God, the Son and the Holy Ghost, the foundation of this church in Thurstonland in the parish of Kirkburton, to be dedicated to His service by the name of St Thomas, was laid by Wm. Walter, Earl of Dartmouth, on the 26th July, 1869. Richard Collins, vicar of Kirkburton; Robert Boyle Thompson, curate of Thurstonland; George W. Jenkinson, churchwarden of Thurston-land, James Mallinson and Wm Swindon Barber, architects.

The stone was lowered into place, struck by the Countess with a mallet, and declared laid. Thompson ended the service and the choir sang God Save the Queen. The ceremony was not over, however, until the Earl had been formally thanked by Collins and had replied with a long speech which mentioned donations, touched on evangelism and dwelt on his newborn grandson. There was benediction from Collins, the procession left and the audience dispersed.

Three hundred persons then enjoyed luncheon served in a marquee in the next-door field, alongside the road. There were many speeches, including a long one from the Earl: this time discussing church and laity, flattering the clergy and mentioning the Irish Church Bill. A number of toasts were given, drunk and responded to at length. A toast was made to the architects and Barber responded, concluding the speeches with a toast to the ladies.

=== Consecration ===
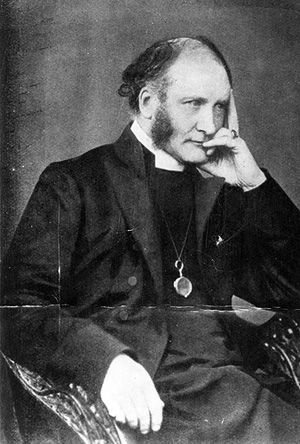
Robert Bickersteth, Bishop of Ripon, who consecrated the church

The church and graveyard were consecrated at 11 am on 3 October 1870 by Robert Bickersteth, Bishop of Ripon, although part of the graveyard had already been consecrated by 1862, and the spire was not completed. The pews were filled to overflowing when the bishop processed into the church, followed by over thirty local clergymen, all repeating Psalm 24. The bishop read the sentence of consecration, followed by morning prayers. The choir sang, and the almost-completed organ was played for the first time by Samuel Pontefract (1815–1896) of South Crosland. The bishop's sermon was based on Psalm 122, verse 1. He alluded to the recent building work, the need for support from the laity in spirit and funding, and the pressing need for the final £400 required to pay off building costs. The collection amounted to £313 7s 1d. The bishop then processed outside with the clergy, to consecrate the burial ground.

The marquee had appeared again in the neighbouring field, and a luncheon was enjoyed this time by only 100 persons, including the Bishop of Ripon, Rev. Collins of Kirkburton, Archdeacon Musgrave, the Earl and Countess of Dartmouth and other VIPs. The bishop and archdeacon ate and left, then a long series of toasts and speeches began. As chairman of the proceedings, the Vicar of Kirkburton stated that W.S. Barber the architect was unable to attend due to illness, but that he "had worked very hard in connection with the church; he had paid them a great many visits, and his superintendence had been untiring." In his speech, Rev. Thompson referred obliquely to the free seating in the new church, saying that rich and poor could worship together, and exhorting his privileged audience to take full part in public services regularly. The evening service raised £50, making the total collection for the day £363 7s 1d towards paying off the final £400 owing for building costs.

=== Resources ===
There are historical leaflets available at the church. The parish records for St Thomas', along with church magazines from Thurstonland, are held at West Yorkshire Archive Services.

== Structure ==
It is a Grade II listed building situated in Marsh Hall Lane, Thurstonland, Huddersfield, West Yorkshire. It is set in a Conservation Area.

=== Original design ===
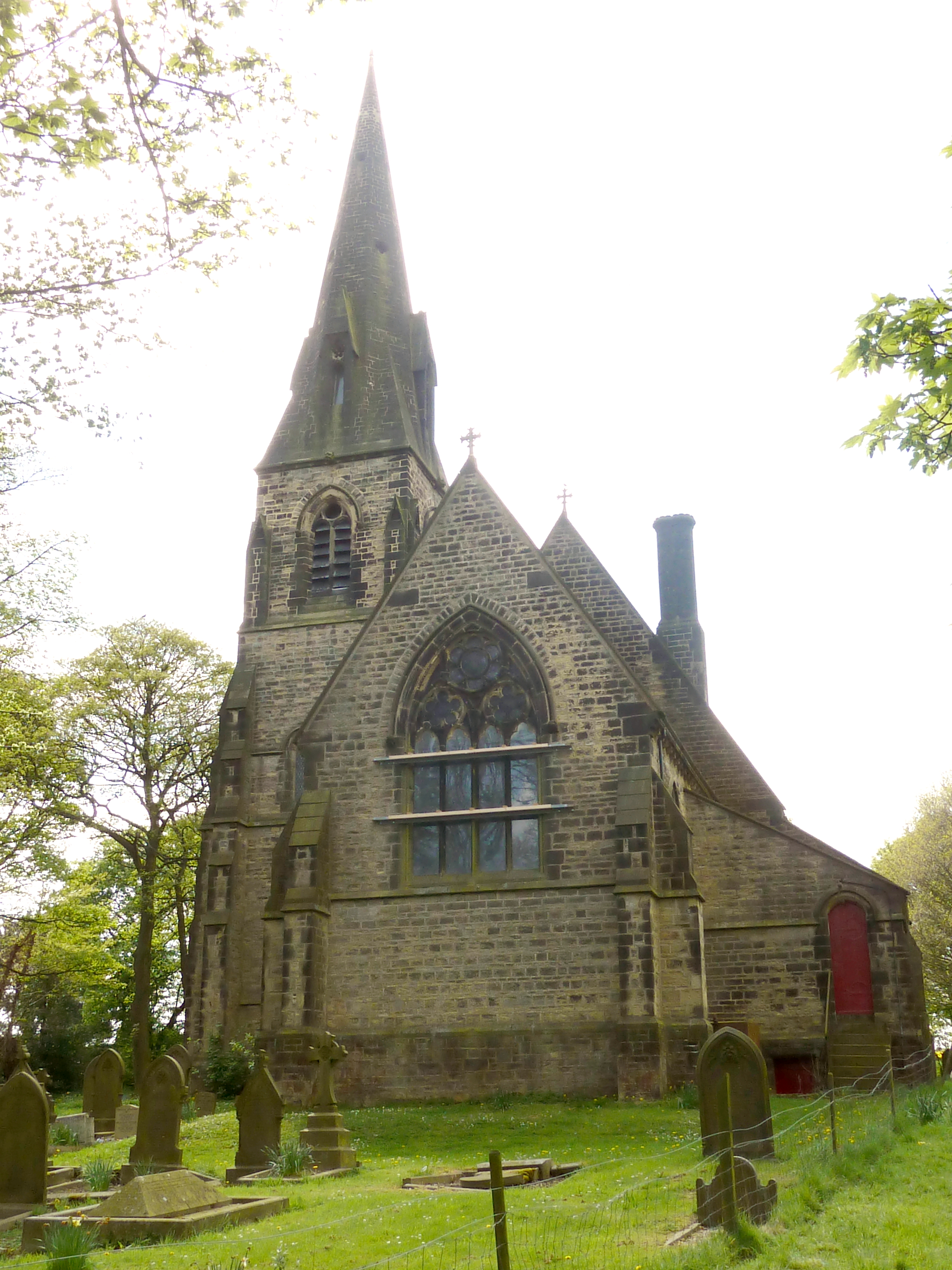
East view of church

As originally designed in the "geometric decorated style of architecture" to accommodate 385 adults and children, the nave was 69 feet (21 m) by 28 feet (8.5 m), and 47 feet (14 m) high to the roof-ridge. The tower was 17.5 feet (5.3 m) square with a height of 57 feet (17 m). The stone spire was originally designed to be 40 feet (12 m) but was ultimately raised to 52 feet (16 m). The organ chamber measured 14 feet (4.3 m) and the vestry was 12 feet (3.7 m). The ground floor of the tower doubled as the church porch, and its first floor held a children's gallery – directly beneath the single bronze bell. The nave roof was open-timbered, but the chancel roof was arched and boarded. The pews and choir stalls, designed by Mallinson and Barber, were of stained deal. These were to be for free use, with no rented box pews. Made to the architect's original design and commission, the oak pulpit stood on a stone base and the carved stone font was placed by the south west door.

=== Exterior ===
When the foundation stone was laid in 1869, this Gothic Revival Anglican church was said to have been designed "in the geometric decorated style." It is built of hammer-dressed stone with ashlar dressing. The stone gutter of the slate roof is on moulded brackets. The tower is at the east end of the nave, and it has a stair turret to the second floor on its west side and a splay-footed stone spire with four lucarnes. Over the south door is a canopied niche with a "moulded arched head and figure" beneath.

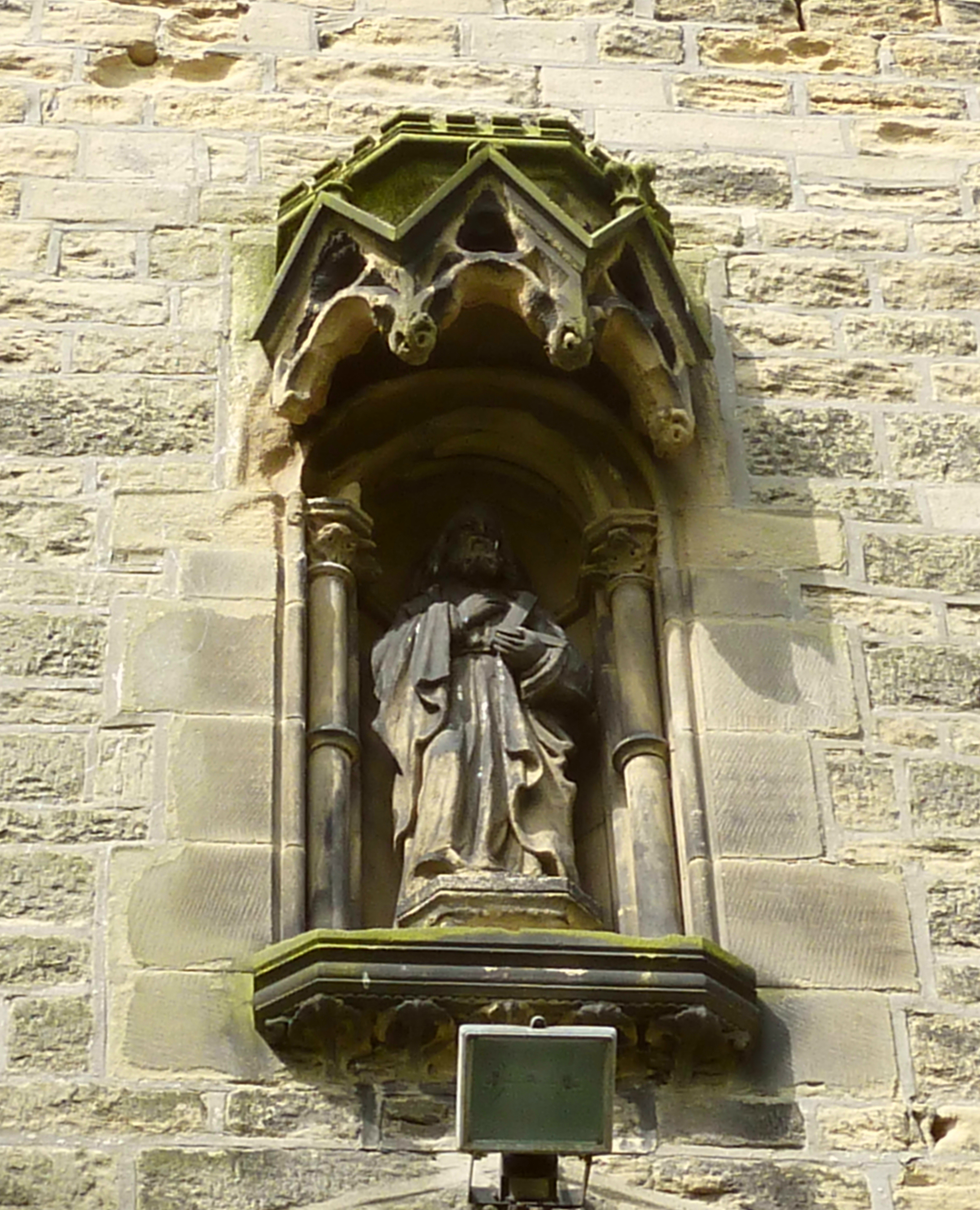
St Thomas in niche over tower door

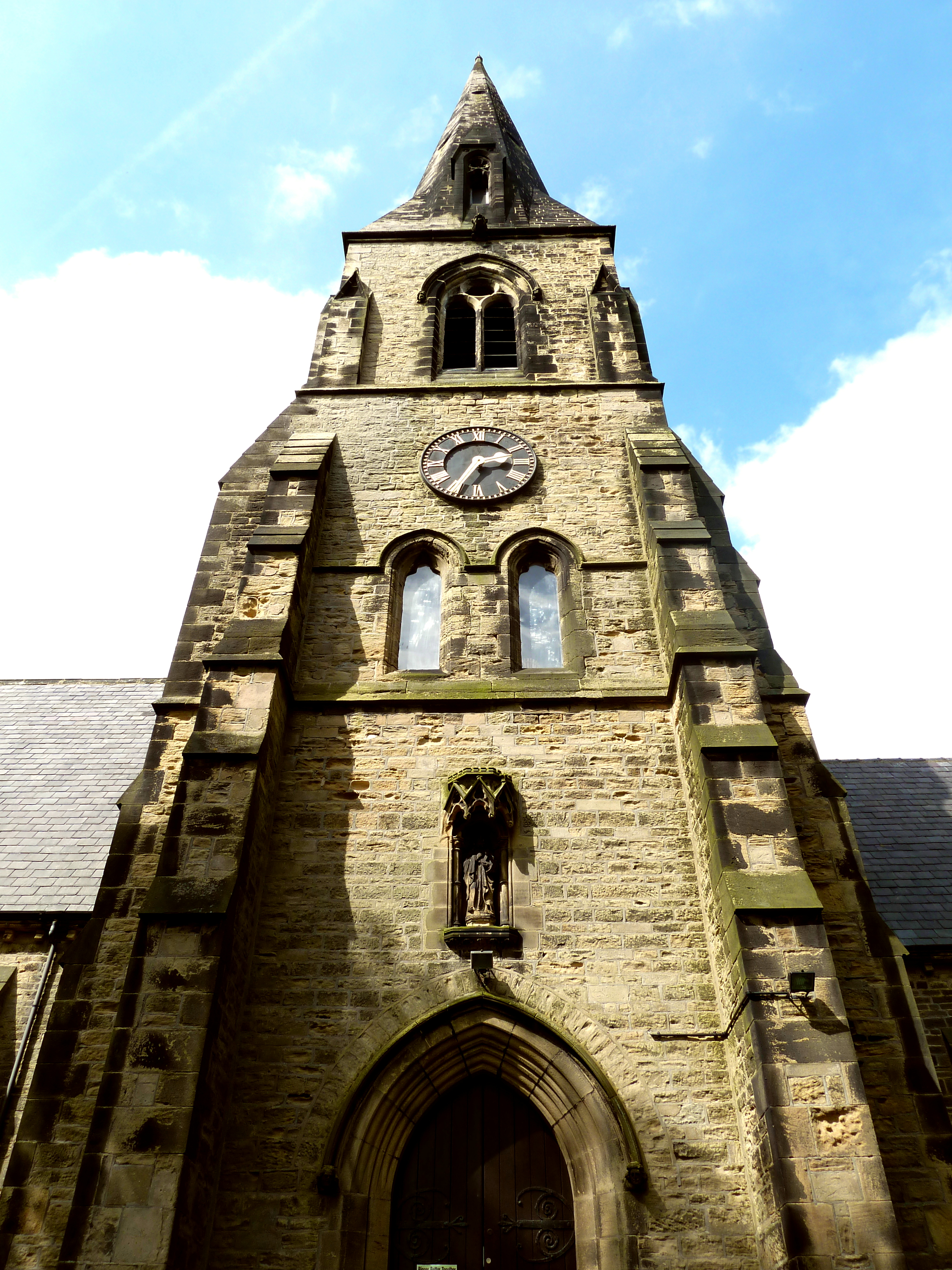
Tower

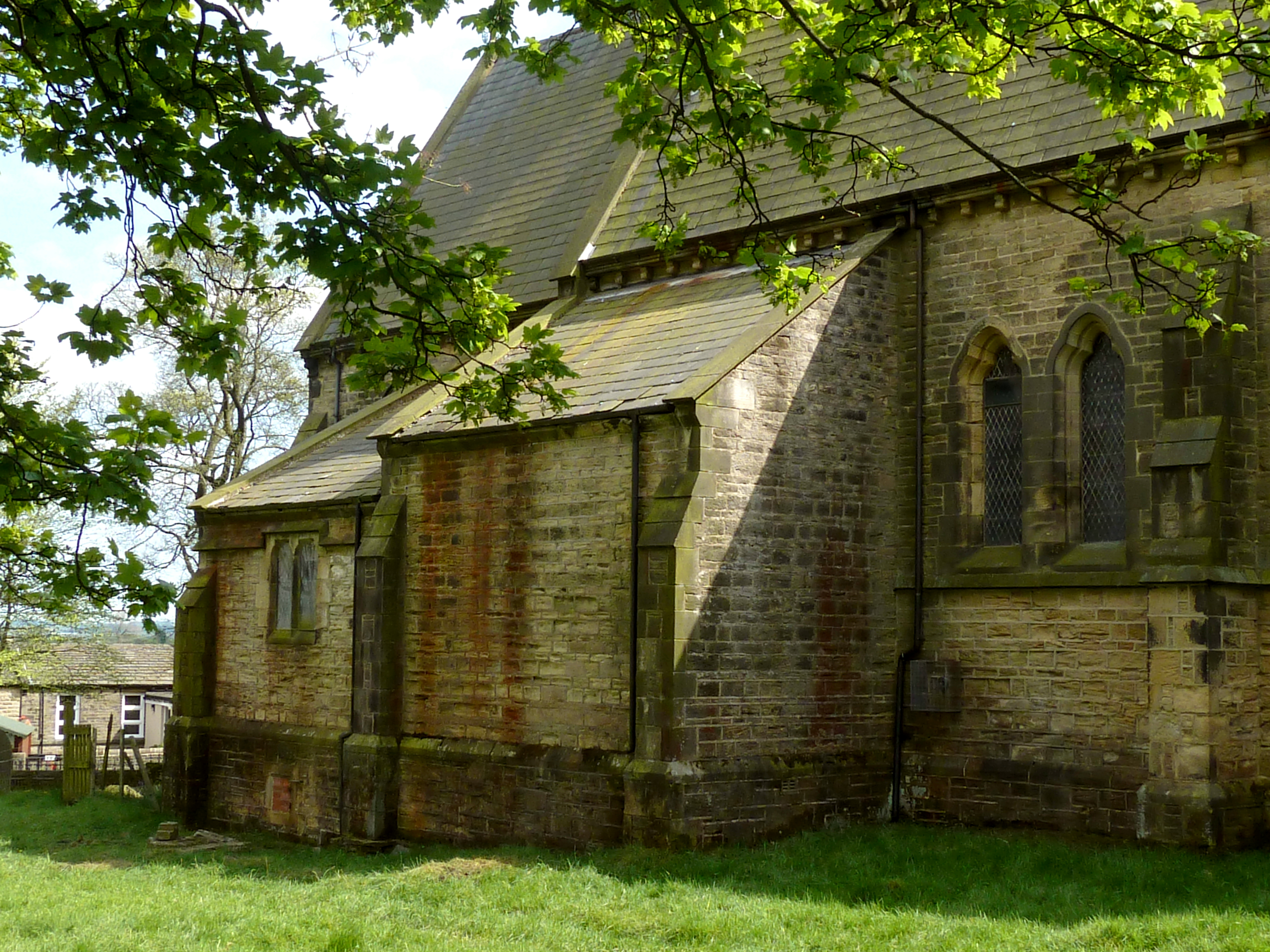
Organ chamber and vestry

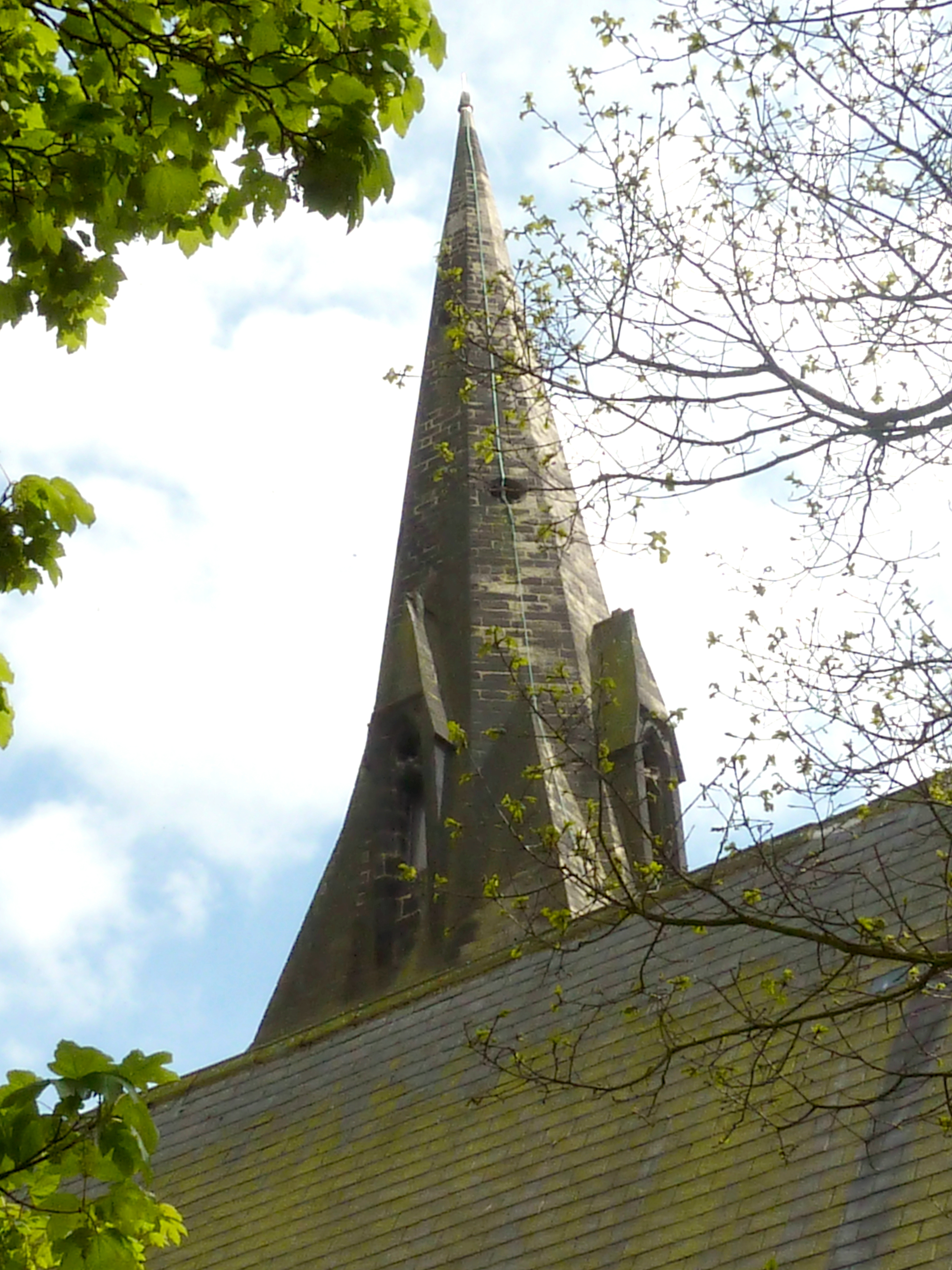
Spire viewed from north

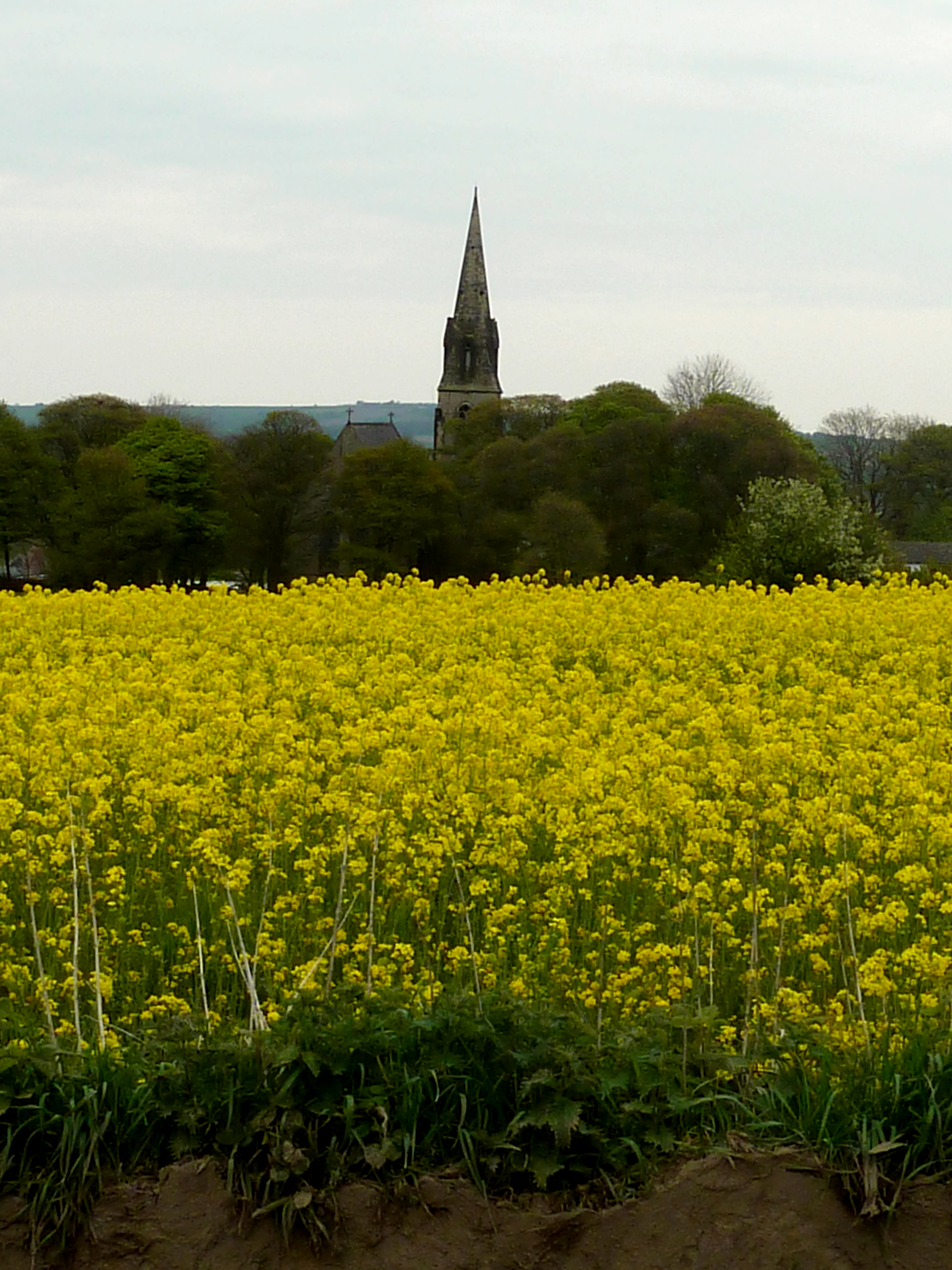
Spire in rural landscape

=== Interior ===
==== Tower ====
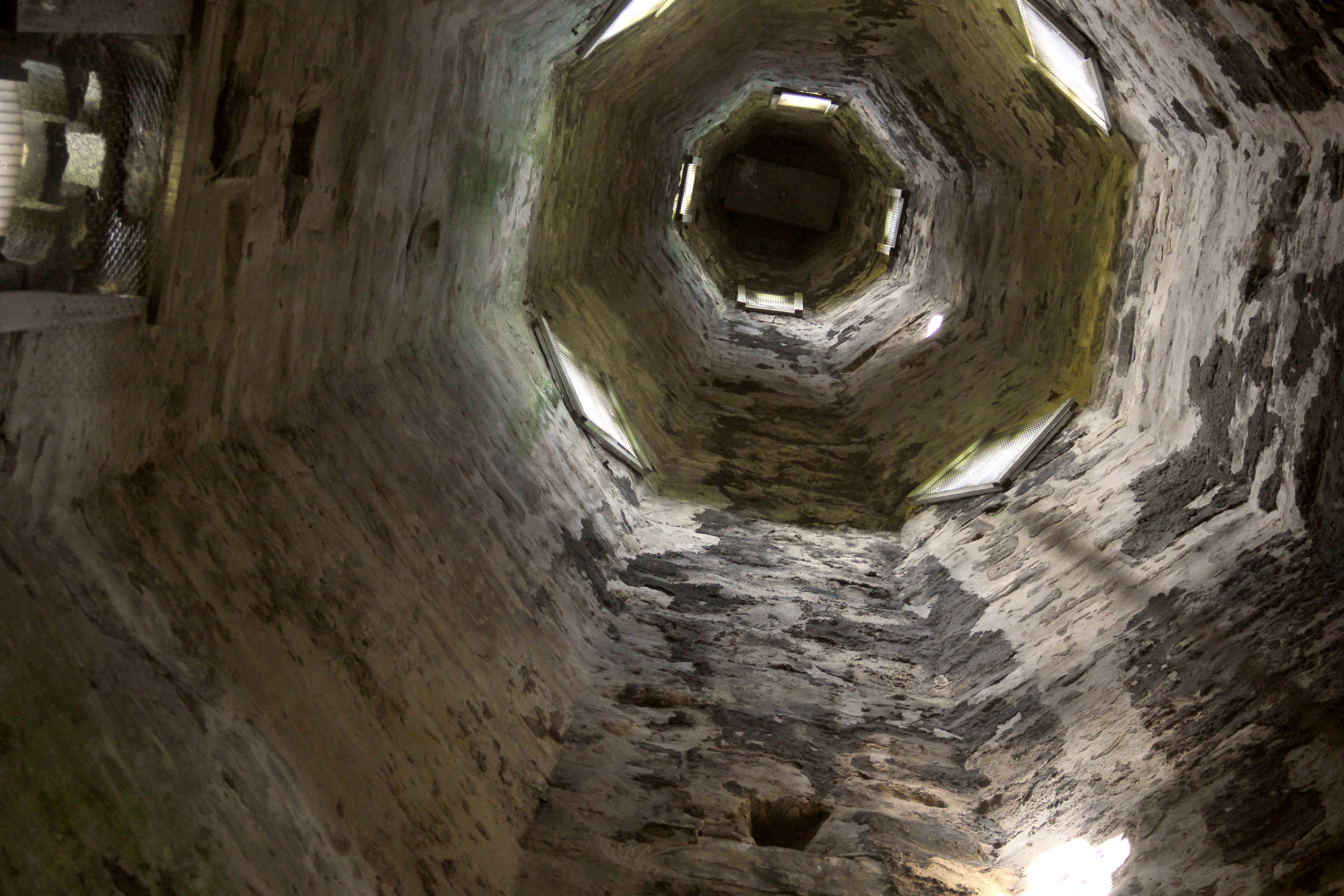
View inside spire

The tower has four floors, of which the ground floor doubles as the church's porch. The first floor is the children's gallery; this has a stepped floor to accommodate the pews, leaving a large, wedge-shaped cavity between the ground floor ceiling and the surface for the seating. The children's gallery is well-lit by large windows, and is open to the nave, forming a balcony overlooking the pulpit. The opening to the nave was closed off around 1984 with a screen and door. The gallery is accessed separately from the nave via the tower's staircase, allowing the Sunday School children to be brought into the gallery and taken away to lessons without disturbing the service. This gallery is long disused and the steps beside the pews have become rotten and unsafe. The second floor is the clock chamber, containing an 1889 turret clock mechanism by Potts of Leeds, who as of 2014 continue to maintain it. The clock chamber has no windows and is completely dark. The bell chamber is on the third floor and contains the single bronze bell and clapper for the clock.

Above the bell frame there is a hole in the bell chamber ceiling, and through that opening can be seen the inside of the spire. It is a hollow cone of stone blocks, unsupported by any interior frame, and is full of light because it has four lucarnes at the bottom, and eight more large openings higher up.

==== Nave ====
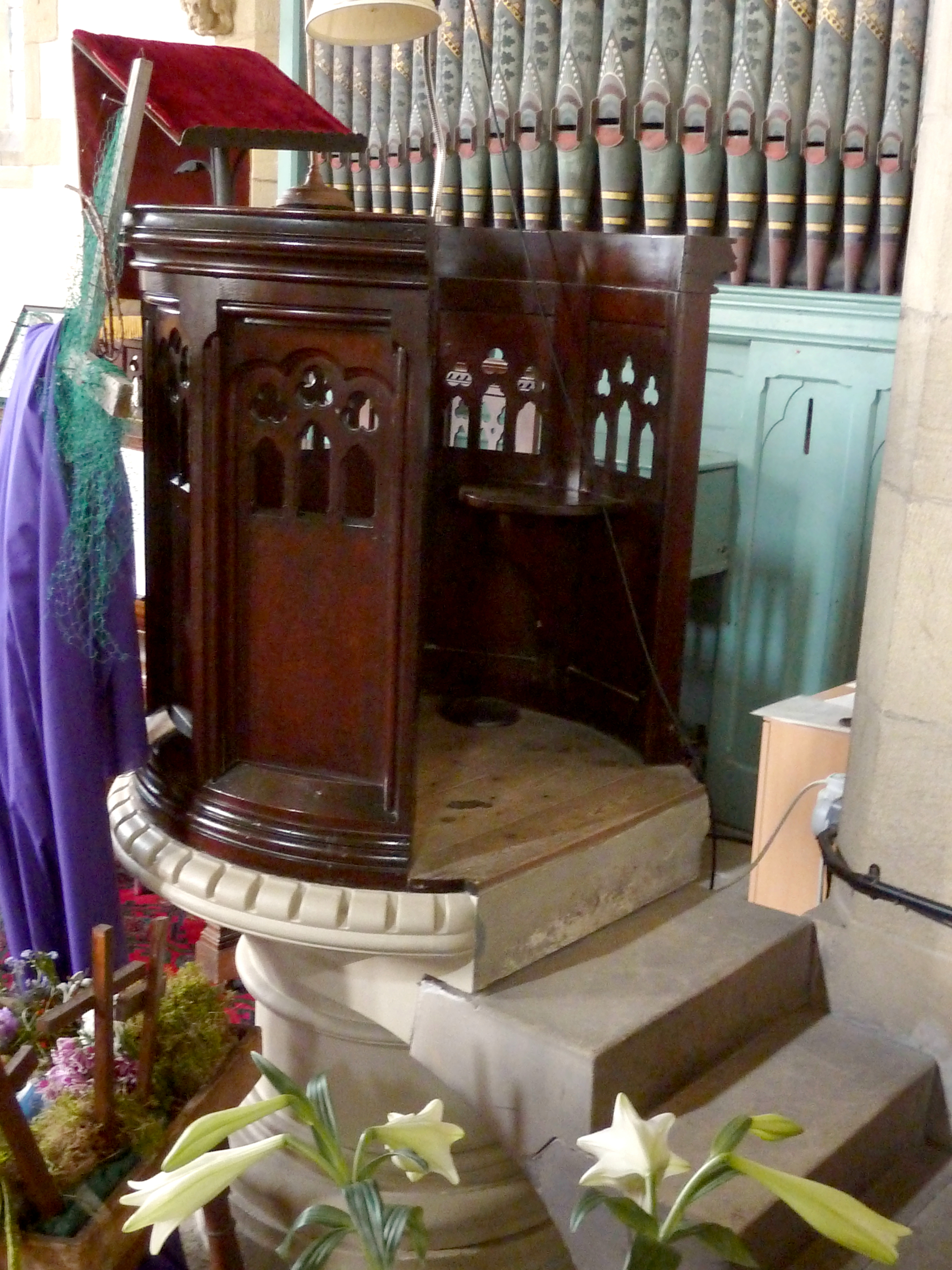
Oak pulpit

Inside there is an arch-braced hammerbeam roof. This is seen to full effect because of the contrasting dark-stained wood against very pale ceiling paint, and the large amount of light from clear-glazed windows. Until at least 1984 there was an 1870 carved, square, marble font standing on four marble colonnettes, designed by Mallinson and Barber and funded by Mrs Bensted, wife of the vicar of Lockwood. The font was replaced in the 1980s, when the church room was installed inside the back of the nave, and the whereabouts of the original is unknown. Because an artisan painter is credited, there may originally have been wall paintings.

The entrance area and aisle are paved with coloured, plain encaustic tiles whose layout pattern was designed by Mallinson and Barber; the floor under the pews retains its original floor boards. The organ was made by F.W. Jardine for Kirtland and Jardine in 1870, and was fully restored in 1990. It fits into the organ arch, which was designed for its dimensions. The original 1870 carved oak pulpit on its carved stone plinth stands in its original position in front of the north side of the chancel arch. Many of the original pews designed by Mallinson and Barber still exist in situ, but the ones at the back of the nave were removed along with the marble font in the 1980s when the church room was constructed there.

==== Chancel ====
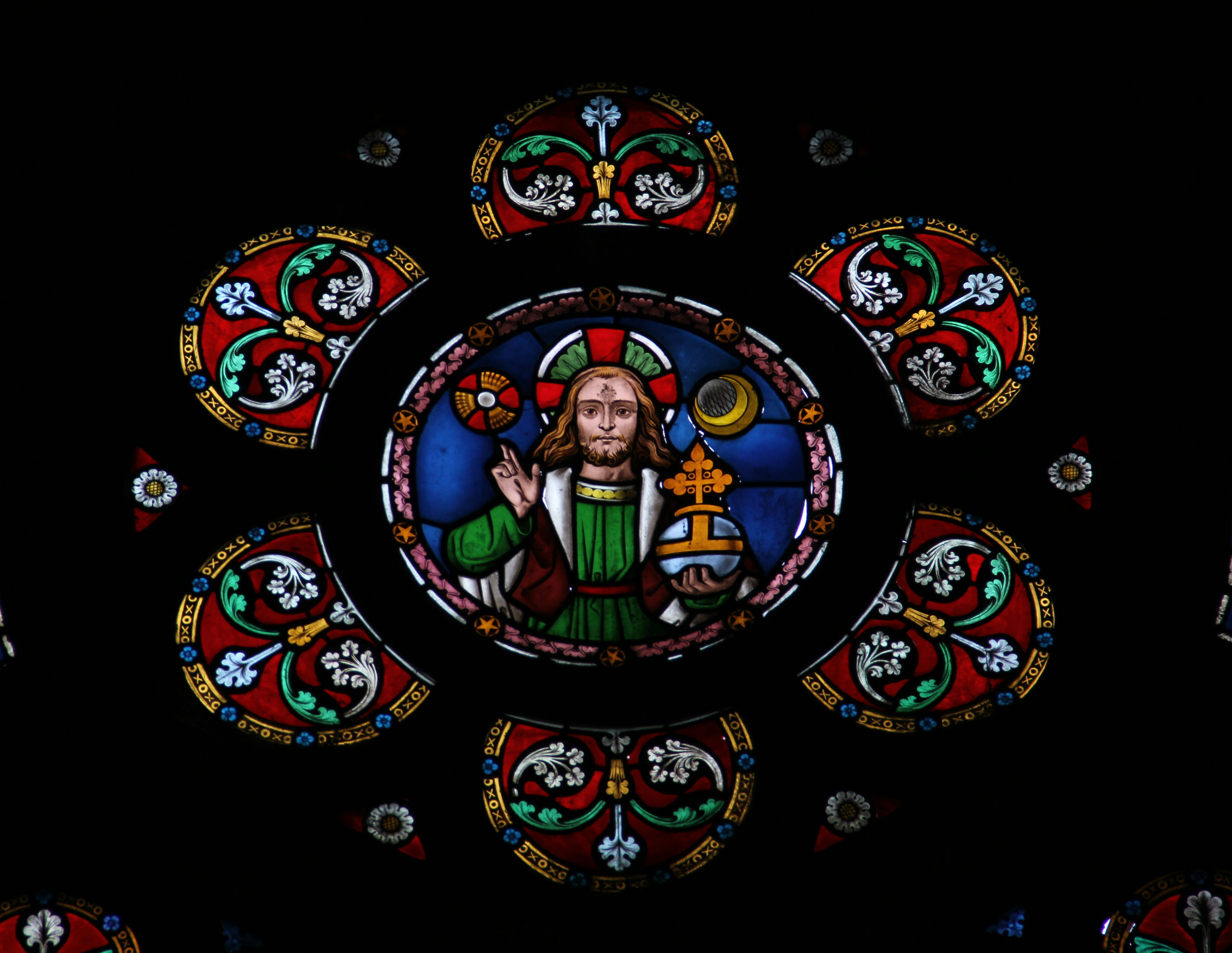
Roundel in east window

The east window by William Wailes represents the Parable of the Good Samaritan; it cost £100 and was funded in 1870 by the local inhabitants in memory of Thomas Brooke, father of the 1869–1870 fund-raising treasurer Colonel Brooke. Rev. Richard Collins stated at the 1870 consecration that the theme of Good Samaritan and the word "just" in the window's dedication referred to Thomas Brooke's good deeds. The reredos was installed in the 1920s, and on its bottom right hand skirting board there is a wooden plaque commemorating its presentation. The sanctuary has decorative encaustic floor tiles whose arrangement was designed by Mallinson and Barber. These tiles were funded by D. Sharman who was master of Thurstonland Endowed School. The choir stalls and the altar rail are decoratively carved, and were designed and commissioned by Mallinson and Barber.

==== Interior views ====
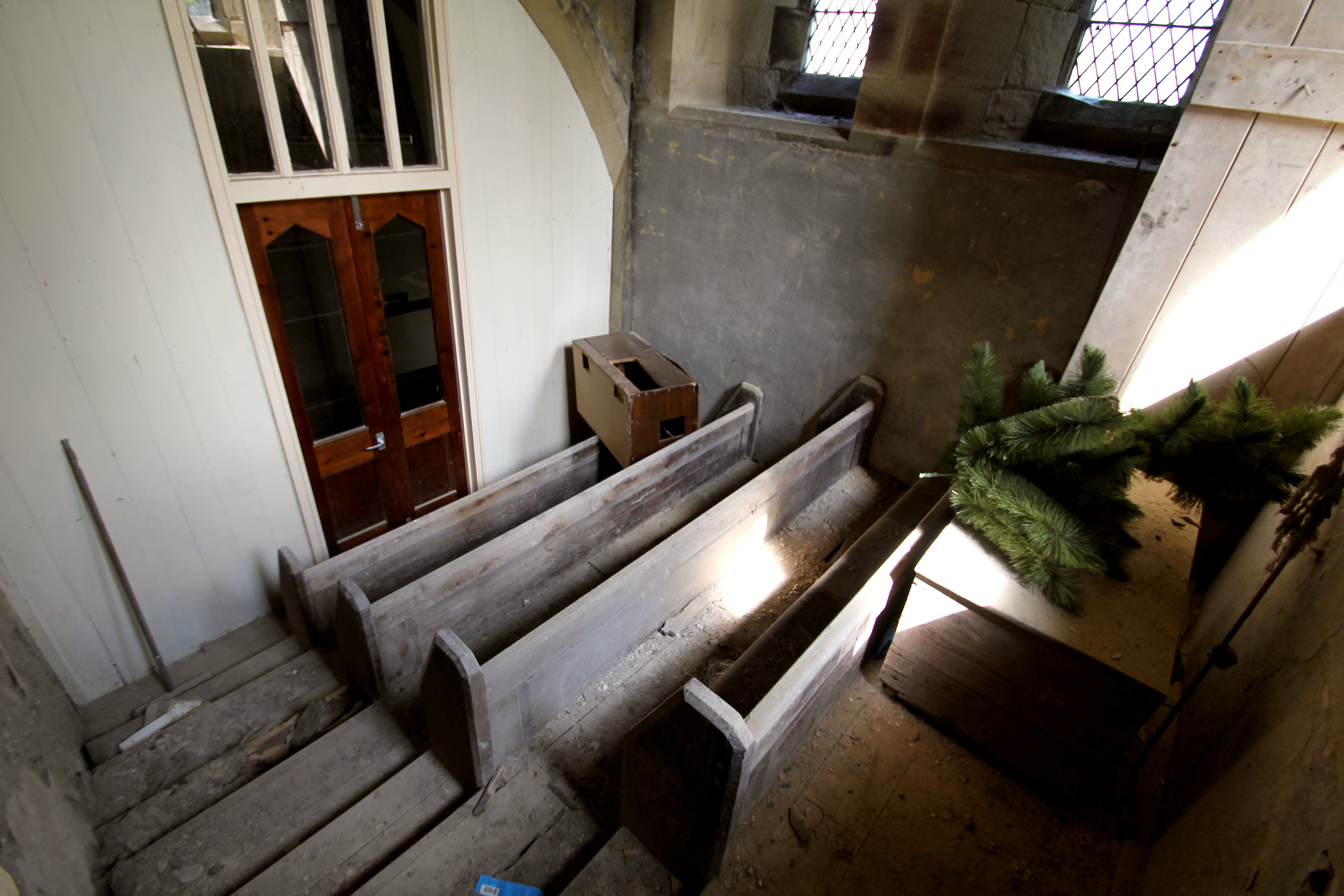
Children's gallery

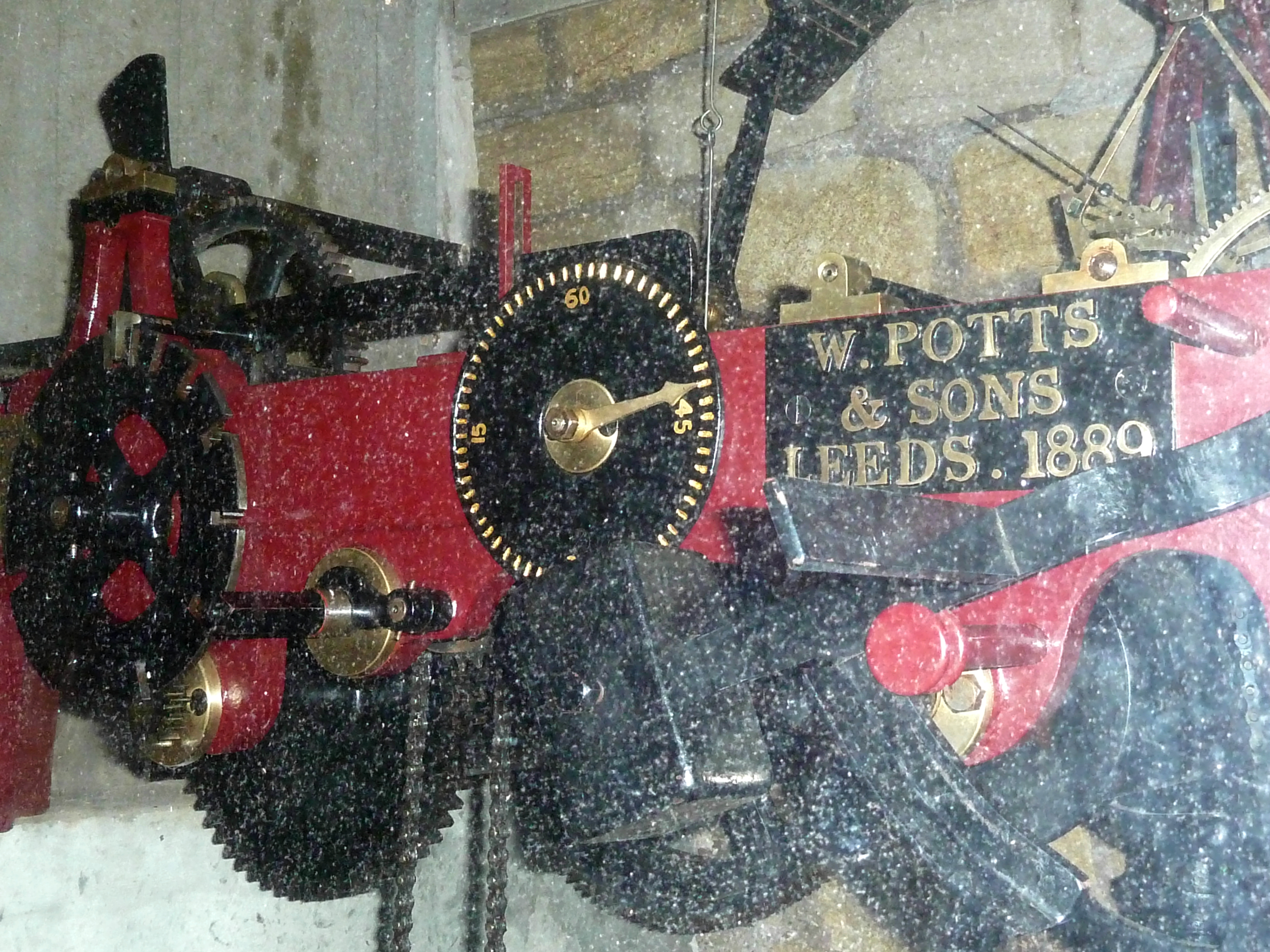
Turret clock mechanism by Potts of Leeds

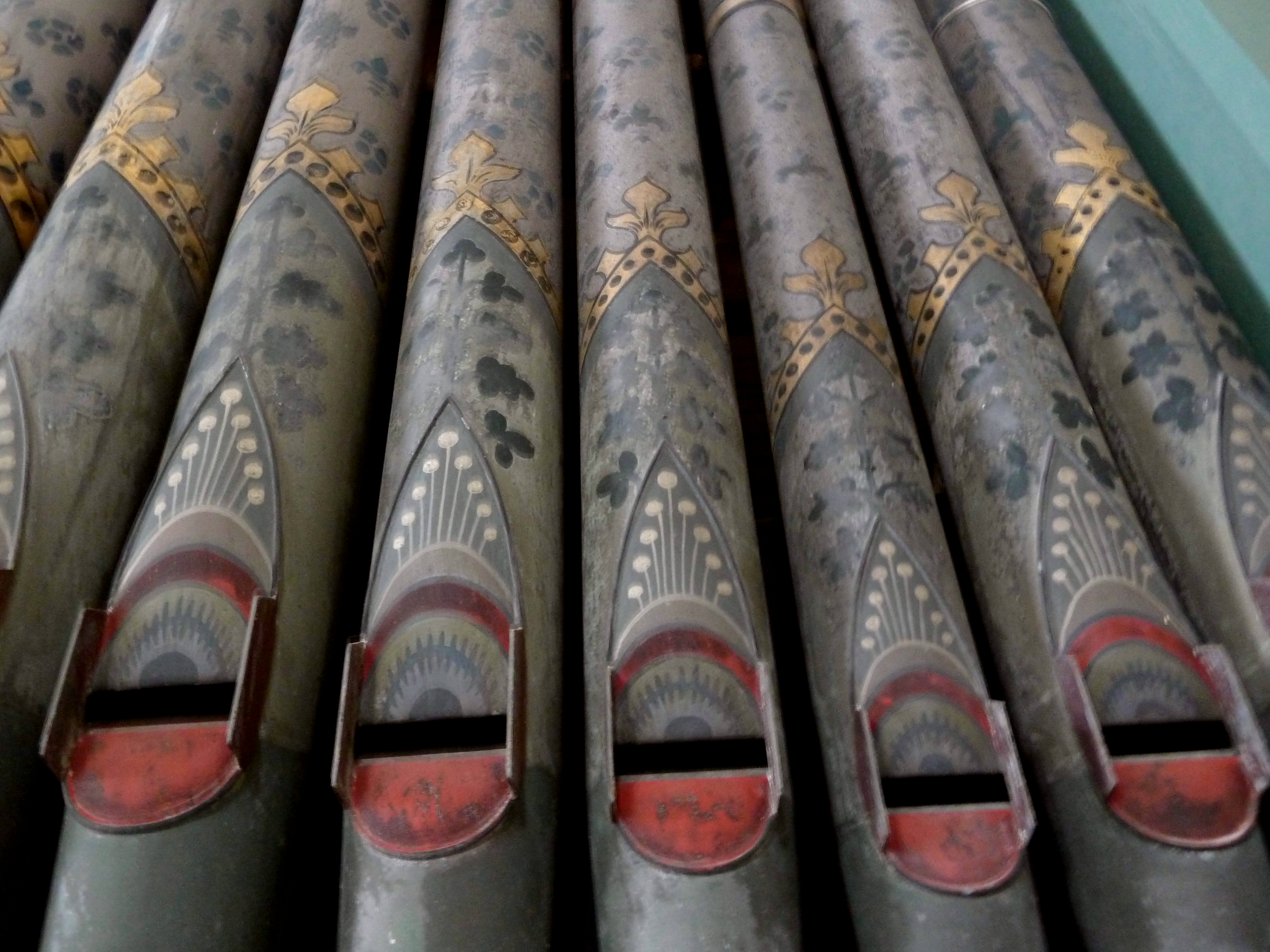
Painted organ pipes by Kirtland and Jardine

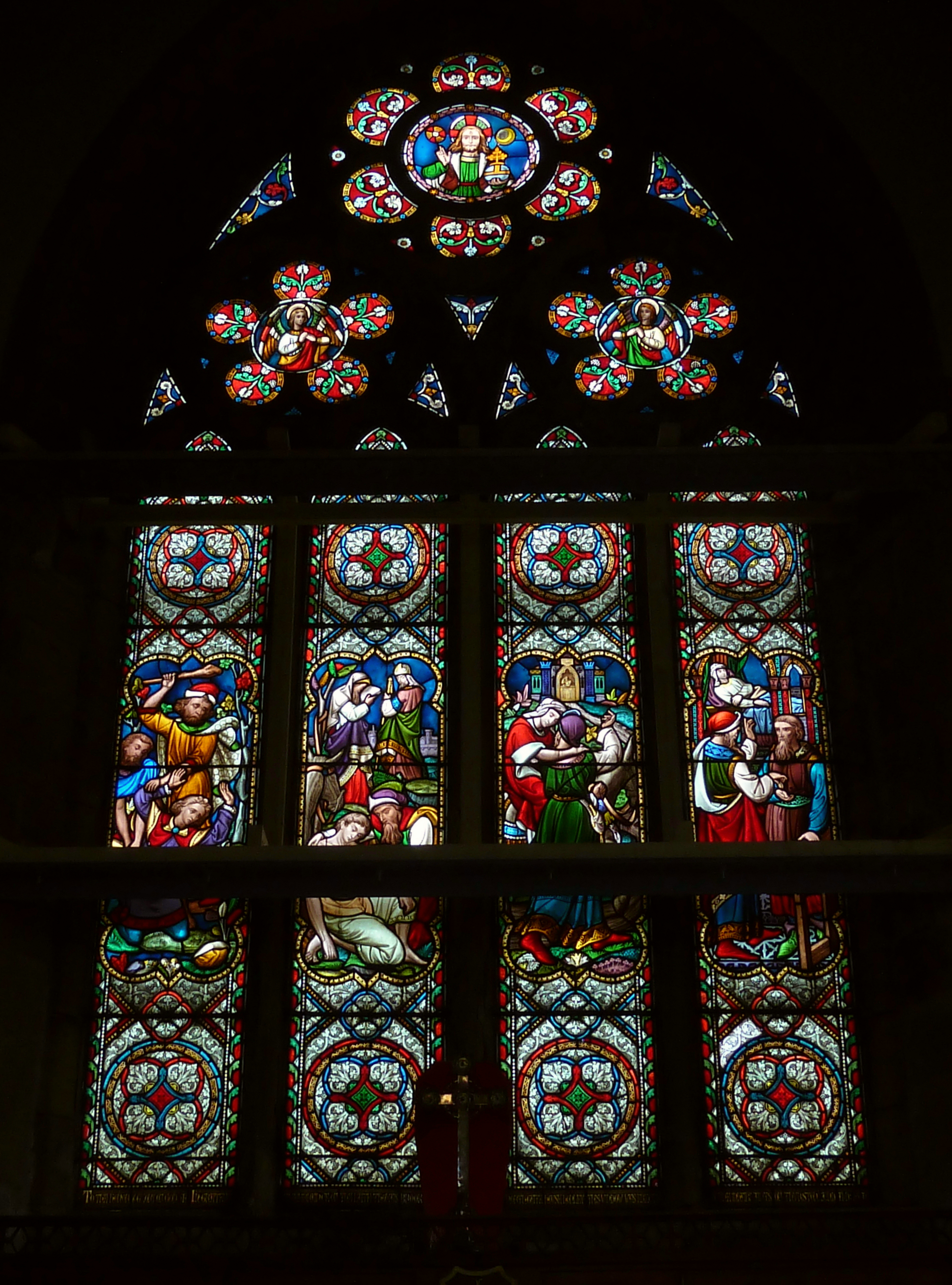
East window by William Wailes

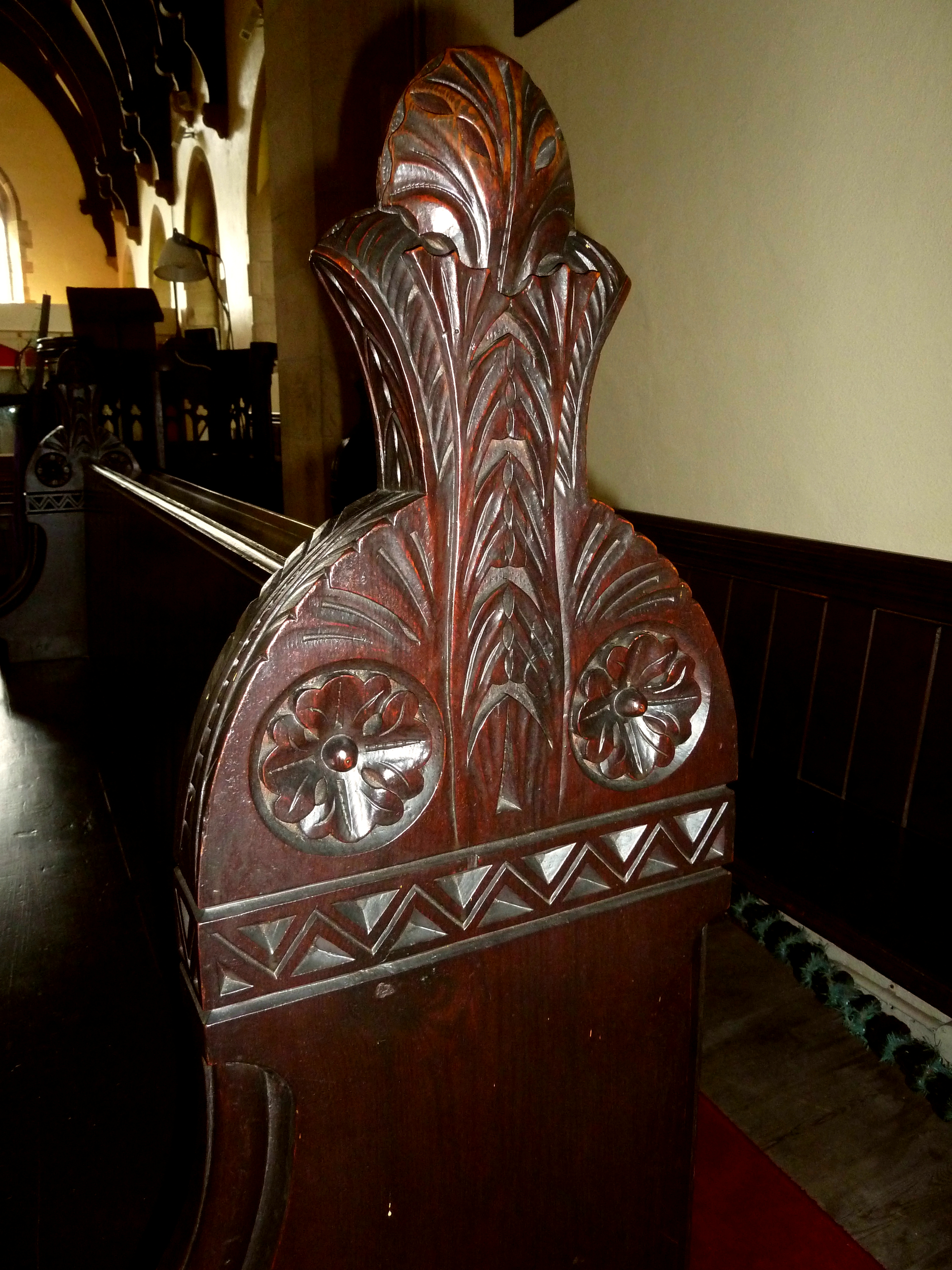
Carved choir stall designed by Mallinson and Barber

== Graveyard ==
Although the church itself was not consecrated until 1870, part of the graveyard was available for burials by 5 March 1862. The extant 1880 plan of the main area does not conform to the present layout – for example the paths are missing – and there are no sexton's records of individual burial sites; however there is a burial register transcript. It is an Anglican graveyard, although nonconformist and Catholic burials are recorded here. St Thomas' churchyard contains Commonwealth war graves of five British Army soldiers and one Royal Air Force airman of World War I.

=== Storthes Hall section ===
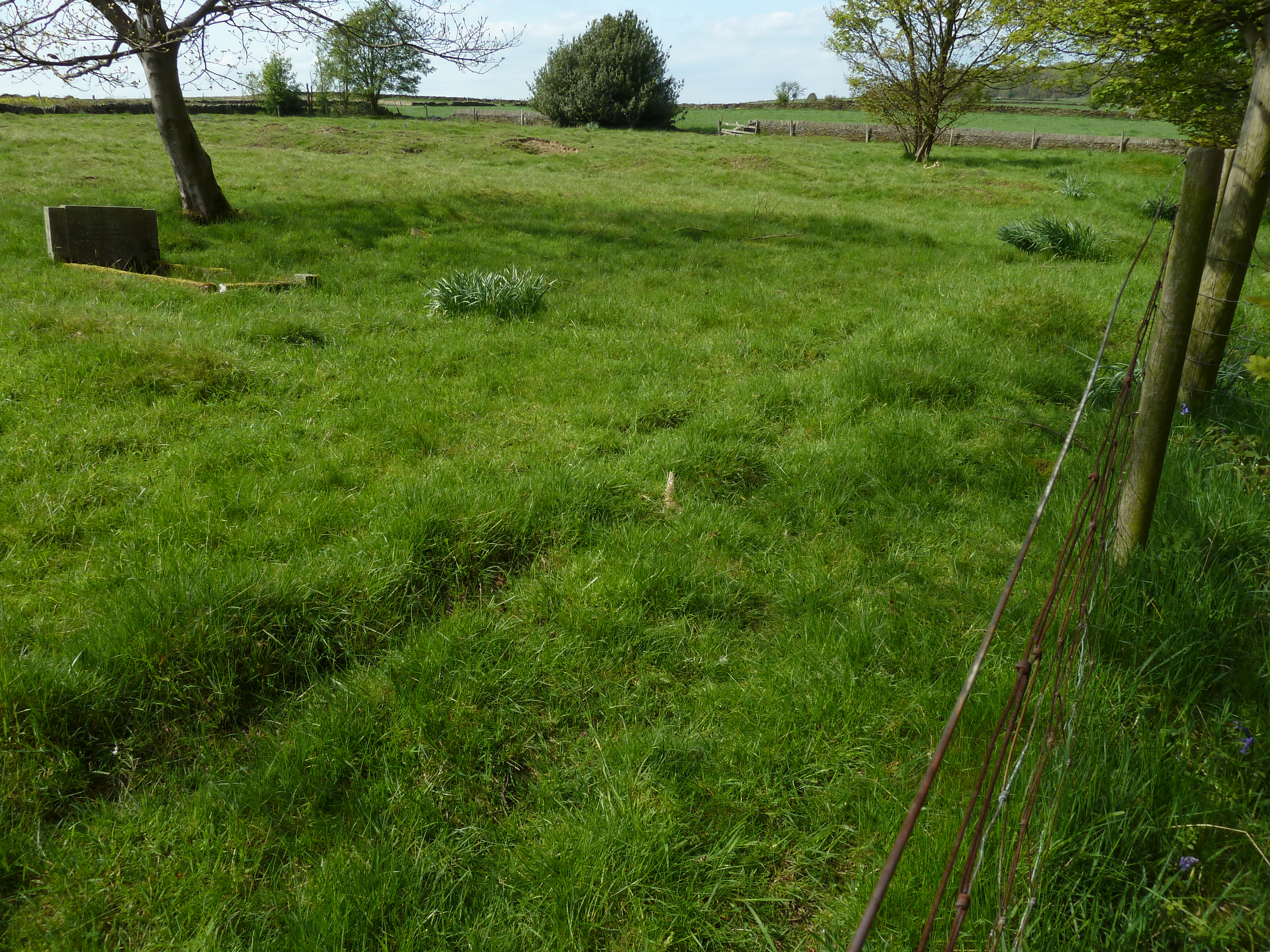
Undulating surface of unmarked Storthes Hall graves

The churchyard contains around 2,000 graves of patients who died at Kirkburton in Storthes Hall Hospital (1904–1991). Most of these graves are unmarked, in a separate field behind the church which was added by Rev. Arnold Escombe Jerram before he left in 1910. By 1913 there was fear in the village that the pauper burials were causing epidemics, because the sexton was saving money by leaving graves open to rain and weather, and not filling them with earth until they each contained their full complement of four coffins. The authorities claimed that Storthes Hall's use of the graveyard benefited Thurstonland by the payment of rates and that only fifty paupers per year, who were unclaimed by relatives, were buried there. Rev. P.S. Brown, at that time vicar of Thurstonland and chaplain to Storthes Hall, claimed that the burials were no danger to health, even though the sexton had to ladle out water from open graves before subsequent funerals.

== Clergy ==
=== George Lloyd 1861–1865 ===
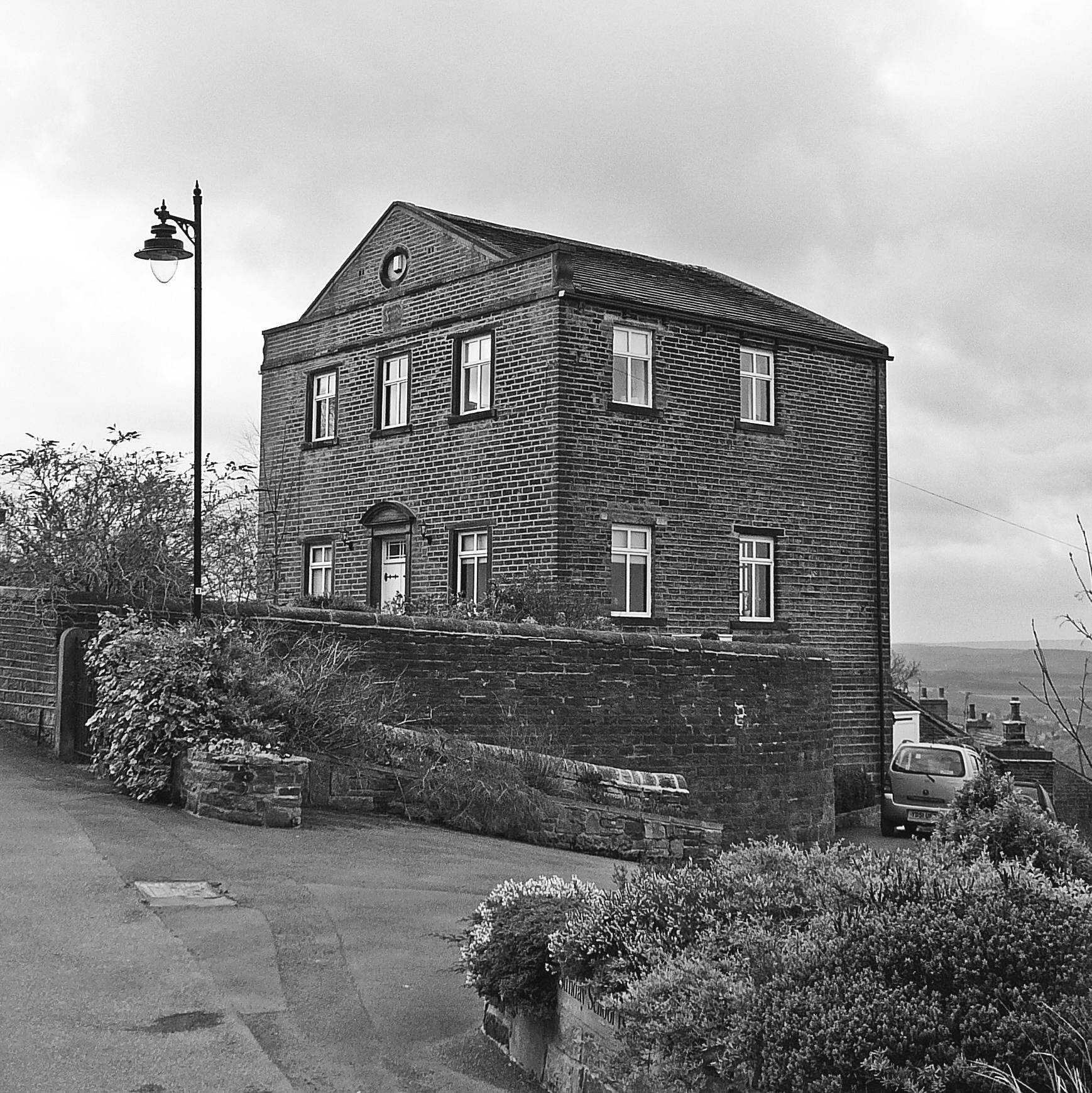
Dissenters' Chapel, Thurstonland

Reverend George Lloyd, (1820–1885) was Curate in Charge of Thurstonland under R. Collins, Vicar of Kirkburton, from 1861 to 1865, using the old dissenters' chapel room before the present building existed. From 1865 until at least the end of the 1870s he was curate of Trimdon in County Durham, Church Gresley in South Derbyshire and Cramlington in Northumberland. He was an outspoken man who once received an assassination threat. He was the leading founding member of the Huddersfield Archaeological and Topographical Association, which was later to become the Yorkshire Archaeological Society. The society was founded in 1863 for the purpose of funding and organising excavations at Slack Roman fort. These excavations were initially supervised and documented by Lloyd himself. His excavations were partially funded and supported by the Earl of Dartmouth who later funded the building of St Thomas' Church.

=== Robert Boyle Thompson 1868–1877 ===
Robert Boyle Thompson (1840–1906) was of Irish ancestry. His father was Robert Thompson of The Diamond, Coleraine, Northern Ireland. Thompson was the brother of Bennett Thompson (died 1896), a solicitor of Granite Hall, Dún Laoghaire, Ireland, and he attended the big funeral there. On 24 April 1867 at St John's Church, Upperthong, Thompson married Hannah Thewlis, eldest daughter of N. Thewlis of Lane House, Holmfirth.

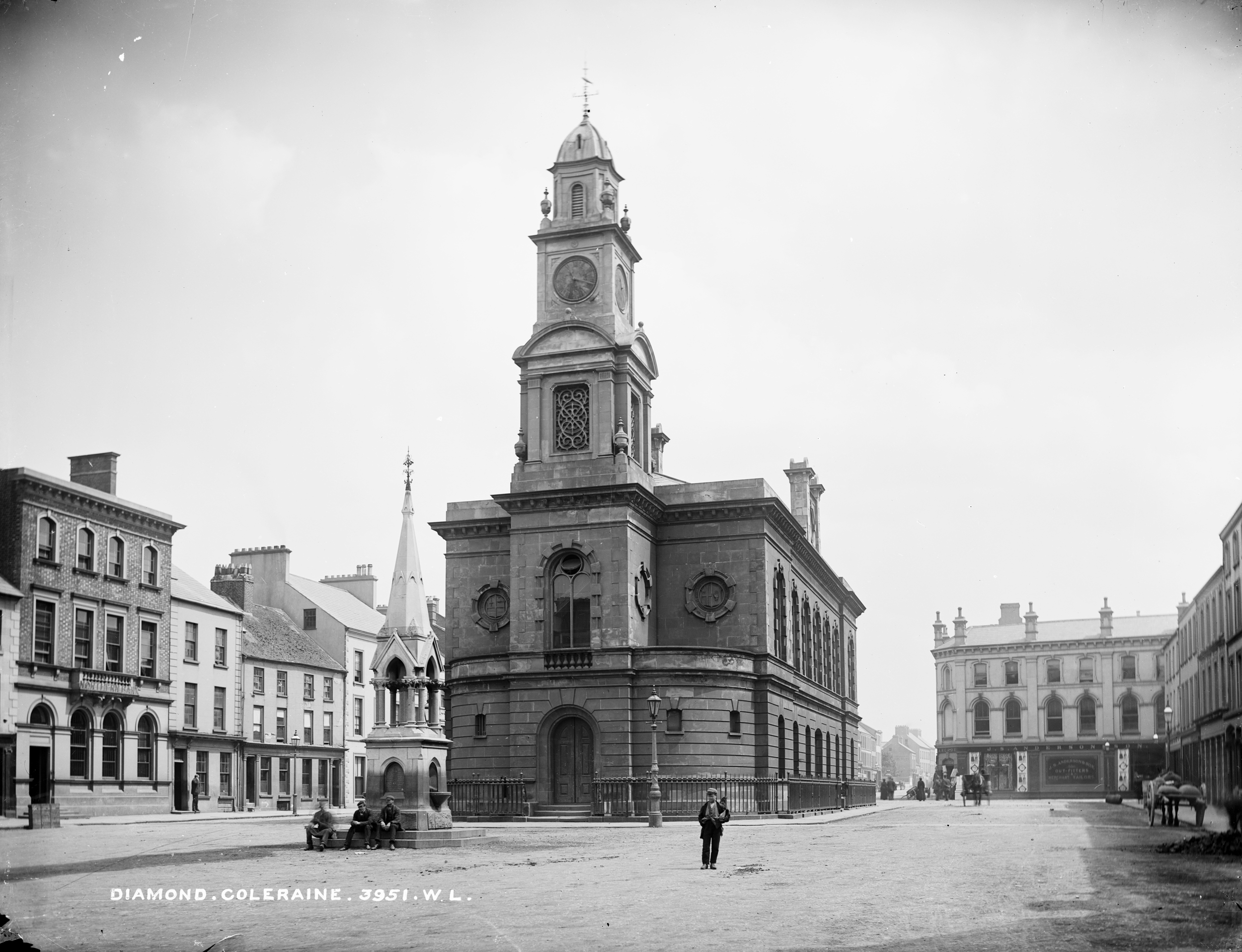
The Diamond, Coleraine, where his father came from

Thompson was educated at Queen's College, Birmingham, graduating in 1863. On 29 June 1865 he was ordained deacon by the Bishop of Ripon in the chapel of the Episcopal Palace at Ripon. He was ordained priest on Sunday 22 September 1867 by the Bishop in the same chapel. From 1865 to 1868 he was curate of Longwood, West Yorkshire. In 1868 the vicar of Kirkburton, Rev. Richard Collins (1794–1882), appointed him curate of the chapel of ease at Thurstonland, in anticipation of his incumbency of the new parish of Thurstonland and its projected Church of St Thomas, which was to be completed in 1870. In June 1868 the Bishop of Ripon licensed him to the stipendiary curacy of Kirkburton, to officiate in Thurstonland. Thus Thompson was the first curate of Thurstonland to use the new church building. He was formally granted the vicarage of St Thomas in May 1871 where he served until 1877.

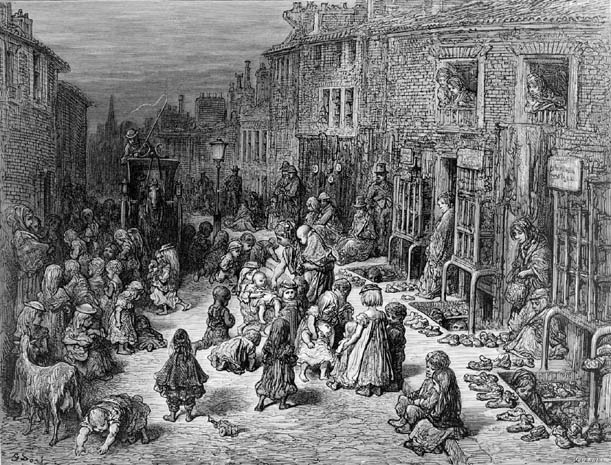
19th century slums of Seven Dials where he did "great work"

In July 1877 until 1878 he was given the perpetual curacy of St Paul, Shepley, West Yorkshire. In March 1878 the Bishop of London, John Jackson, instituted him to the curacy of St James-the-Less, Bethnal Green where he served until 1882. While there he did "great work in the mission district of Seven Dials, London, under the rector of St Giles in the Fields. He [was] believed to be a thoroughly earnest man, a good visitor and preacher, and he [held] evangelical views." He was a London Diocesan Home Missionary from 1880 to 1882. From 1882 to 1894 he was vicar of St Lawrence and St Paul's Church, Pudsey. In Pudsey he was involved in politics, being one of the assentors to the nomination of Conservative candidate Surr William Duncan for local elections, although Briggs Priestley won for the Liberals. In 1894 Brooke Foss Westcott, Bishop of Durham, presented him to the living of Rainton near Fencehouses, Durham. Rev. Thompson died on 10 August 1906 at Rainton rectory in his 67th year, and was interred at St Mary's Church, Rainton on 13 August.

=== David Harrison 1877–1882 ===
David Harrison (1845–1882) was born in Colne, Lancashire. He married Matilda (b. Trawden, 1842) and they had a son Hartley (b. Colne, 1866).

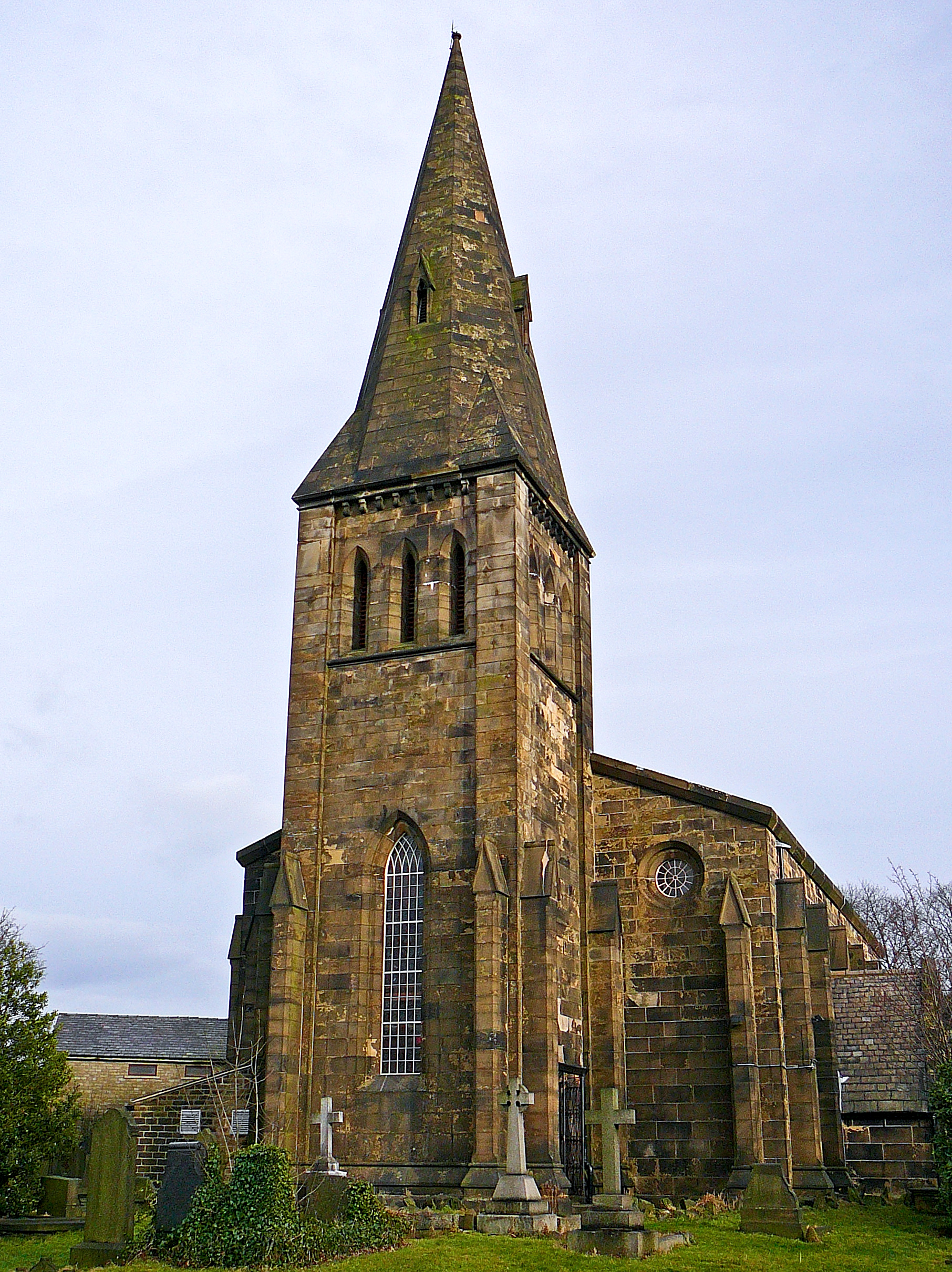
Christ Church, Linthwaite, where he "endeared" himself to the parishioners

He graduated from St Aidan's Theological College, Birkenhead, in 1871. He was made deacon in 1873, and priest in 1875 by the Bishop of Ripon. From 1873 to 1877, Harrison was curate of Christ Church, Linthwaite, and was in sole charge of the parish for much of the time as the vicar had a long-term illness. On Thursday 12 July 1877 there was a parishioners' meeting at the national school at Linthwaite for a farewell presentation to Harrison and his wife. The Huddersfield Chronicle said, "During his stay here his pulpit powers, his genial bearing towards all classes, and his assiduous labours, have endeared him to the whole (sic) parishioners. Mrs Harrison, by her kindness towards all, and her unostentatious works of love, has also caused her name to be revered as a household word." Harrison and his wife were presented with an illuminated address expressing the "kind feelings of the congregation towards them." Harrison was given a clock, and his wife received a silver teapot and a photograph of her Sunday school class. Harrison responded that they had been happy there, and the parishioners gave them three cheers.

In August 1877, he was appointed vicar of St Thomas. The living was worth £205 per year, and the parish population was then 1001. On 19 April 1882, Harrison chaired the routine Easter vestry meeting at St Thomas to appoint new churchwardens. The outgoing wardens were Robert Hallas and Jonathan W. Senior; the new churchwardens were John Foster Johnson and William H. Walker.

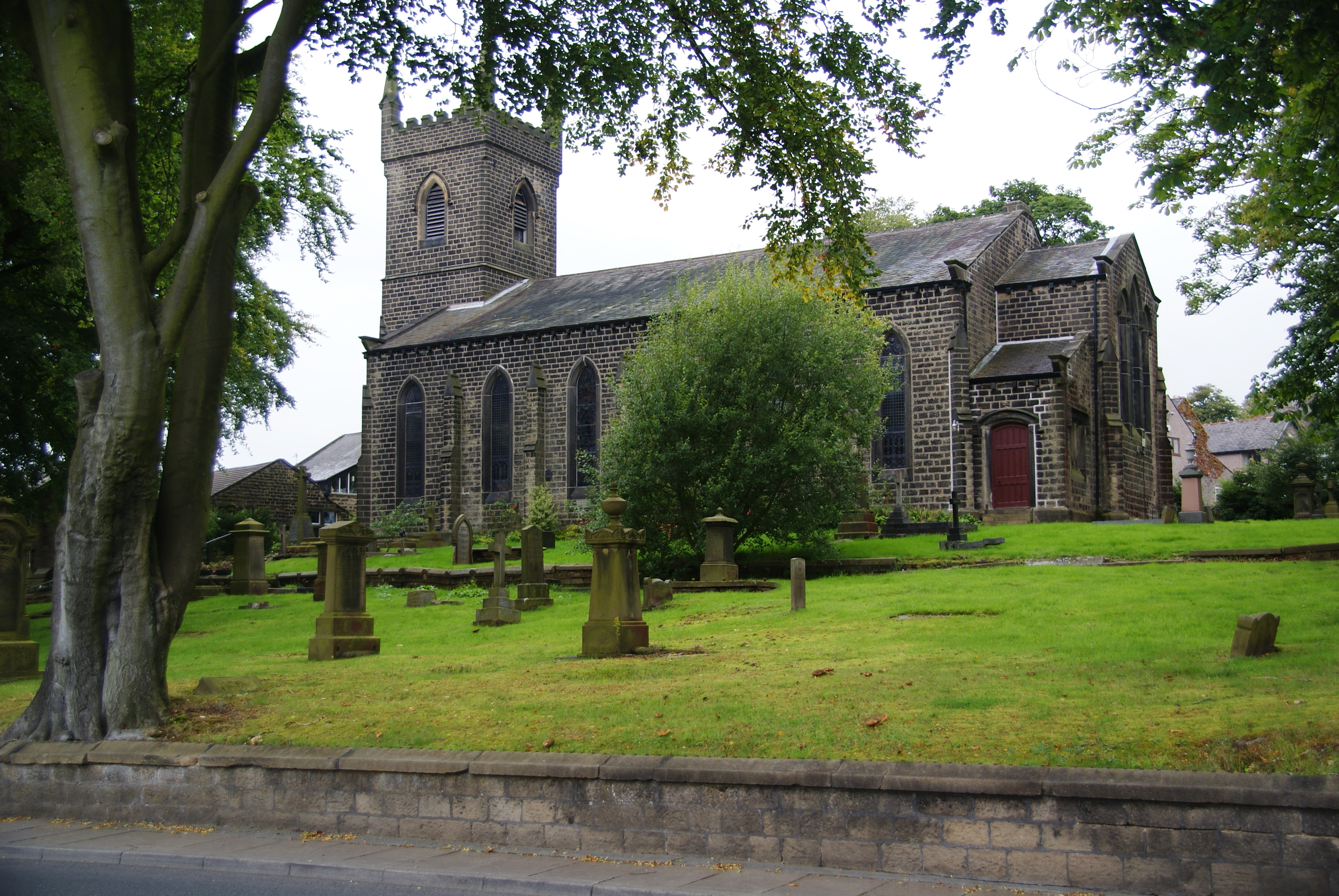
Christ Church, Colne, where he is buried, having died at age 37 years

He died in June 1882, aged 37. The funeral began at 8.30 am on 1 July with a procession following the coffin to the funeral service at St Thomas. This service was attended by seven clergymen: W.H. Girling of Lockwood, John Collins of Holmfirth, Richard Collins of Kirkburton, Thomas Lewthwaite of Newsome, H. Edwards of Linthwaite, John Prowde of Netherthong and H. Johnson of Linthwaite. Revs Richard and John Collins took part of the Burial Service (from the Book of Common Prayer) and the choir and congregation sang hymns. The funeral cortège proceeded on foot 1.5 miles (2.4 km) to Stocksmoor railway station. First came the seven clergy, followed by the coffin on a carriage or barrow, then the family mourners. Then came the churchwardens and a large number of parishioners from Thurstonland and Linthwaite, "to show their sympathy towards the family of one who had laboured so faithfully among them as curate." A number of the parishioners accompanied the coffin by train to Colne via Huddersfield, "to witness the interment of one who had laboured zealously in their midst for a period of five years, and who had succeeded in winning the respect and esteem of his parishioners, and of all with whom he came into contact." He was buried on the same day at Christ Church, Colne. On 19 July his effects, including household furniture, were sold by auction at Thurstonland Vicarage, by the executors of his will.

=== John Leech 1882–1906 ===
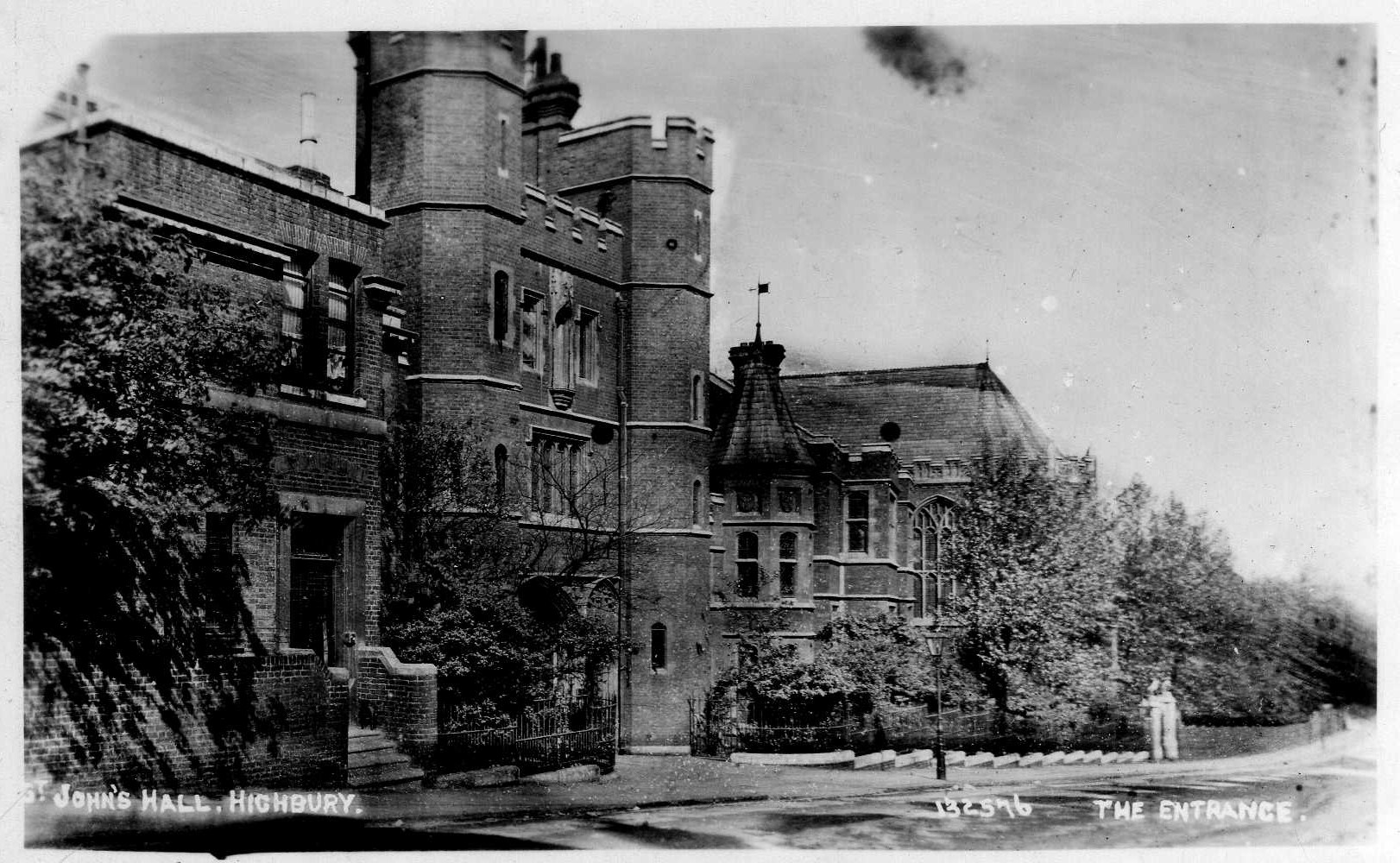
St John's Hall, Highbury, formerly the London College of Divinity

John Leech's father was Isaac Leech, the rich owner of Cleator Mills. John Leech (1856–1932) was born in Cumberland, and his wife Emma Maude Preston (1855–1920) was born in Manchester. She was the second daughter of Major Francis Preston who in 1882 lived at Netherfield House, Kirkburton. They were married by Rev. Richard Collins at Huddersfield Parish Church on 14 August 1882. They had two sons (of whom one died) and two daughters, all born in Thurstonland. Living with them at the vicarage in 1891 were his brother and two servants. One of the daughters married a later vicar of Thurstonland, M. Gerber. They were still at the vicarage in 1901, by which time they had only one servant. By the time of the 1911 Census, Emma Maude and her daughter Florence were visiting at Southport alone. John Leech's brother was Joseph Leech, Conservative MP for Newcastle upon Tyne West.

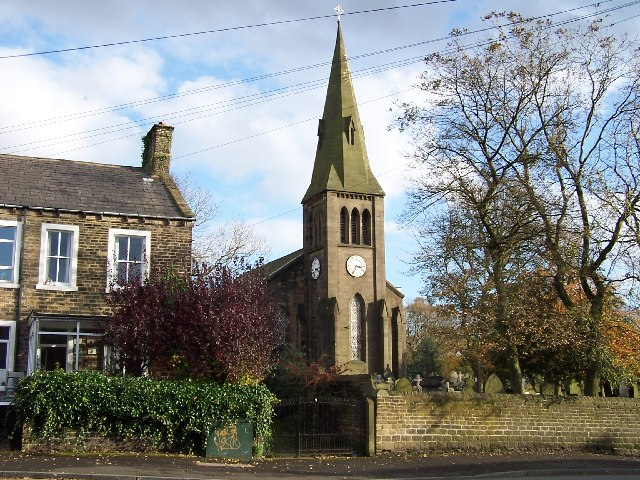
Leech was vicar of Golcar for 25 years

Leech attended London College of Divinity until 1878. He was a graduate of Durham University in 1888 and gained a BA in 1891. He was made deacon in 1880, and ordained priest in 1881 by Bishop Ryan for Ripon. He was curate of Kirkburton from 1880 to 1882. On Tuesday 25 July 1882 the Bishop of Ripon instituted Rev. John Leech to the vicarage of Thurstonland, and he stayed until 1906. His living was worth £180 and a house, with a parish population of 997. In October 1886, along with the whole of the clergy in the rural deanery, all in vestments, Leech attended a dedication festival at the jubilee of the restoration of St Peter's, Huddersfield Parish Church. On Wednesday 10 August 1887 he preached a sermon promoting evangelicalism at St Andrew's Church, Huddersfield, as part of the celebrations on the 17th anniversary of the consecration of the church. In June 1889 he preached the evening sermon at the Meltham Church Sunday School Anniversary, that is, sermons to raise collections on behalf of the Sunday schools. There was choral music, a crowded church and a collection of £42 14s 10d. On the evening of Monday 20 January 1890, John Leech chaired a debate in which "good temper and kindly feeling prevailed" at the National School, New Mill, on the question, "Is the union between Church and State beneficial?" There was much discussion, but the result was affirmative. In July 1906 Leech was appointed vicar of the Church of St John the Evangelist, Golcar, Huddersfield, with a living of £300 per year and a house; he remained in this position until 1931. During his time in Golcar, the value of the living rose from £300 to £400, while the parish population rose from 9,261 to 10,360. He was chaplain to the 7th (Colne Valley) Battalion West Riding Territorial Regiment, and was a founder member of both the Golcar Old Age Pension Committee, and of the Golcar District Association Committee. He retired in April 1931 due to poor health, and died aged 76 years on 3 November 1932 at The Ridings, Thongsbridge.

=== Arnold Escombe Jerram 1906–1910 ===
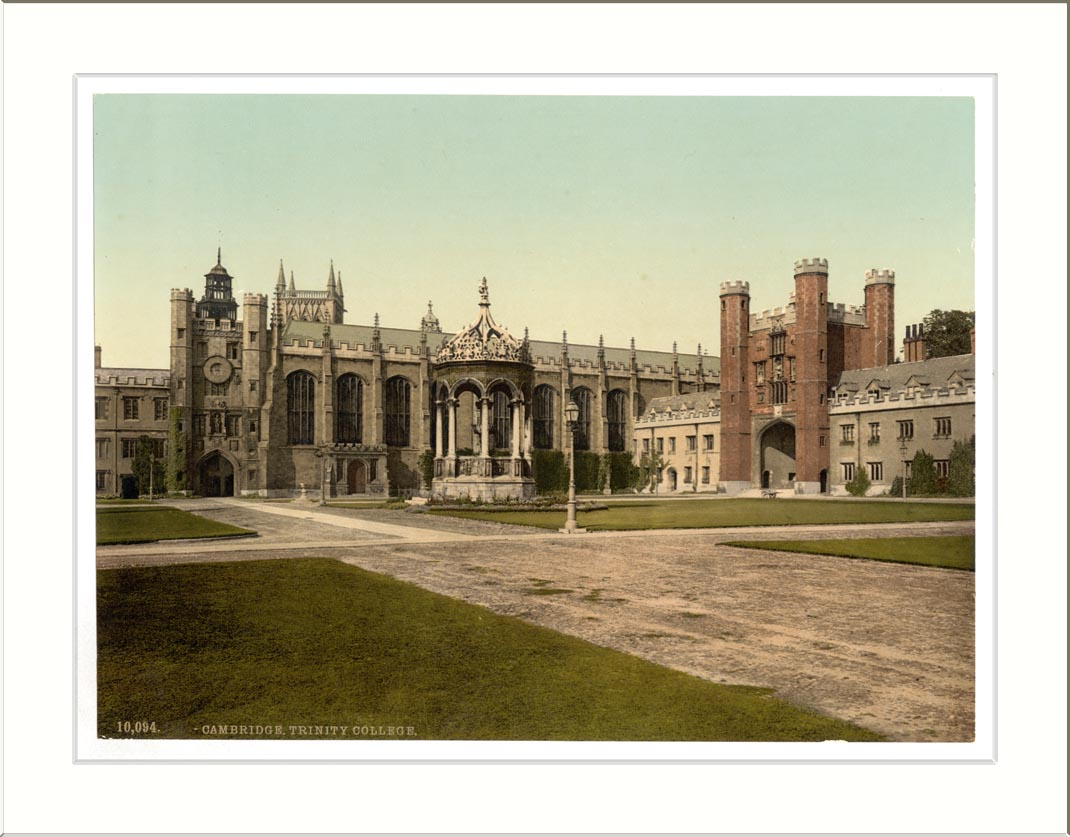
Trinity College, Cambridge, where Jerram was educated

Arnold Escombe Jerram (1868–1934) was born in Clapham, Surrey. He was the youngest son of Edward Jenner Jerram (1811–1885), a merchant working between Cape of Good Hope and Brazil, and his wife Priscilla (1829–1909). The family must have been mobile in the early days, as his eldest sister was born in the Cape of Good Hope, although their mother was born in St Ann's, Soho and their father in St Matthew's, London. In 1861 Edward Jerram and his wife Priscilla were living at 35 Alfred Place West, Kensington, with their eldest daughter, a niece and three servants including a coachman.

In 1881 at age 13 he was living with his family and five servants at 4 Atherton Terrace, Kensington. By 1891 at age 23 he was living with his siblings and widowed mother at Palace Road, Kingston upon Thames. He was living on his own means, as was his mother, although his brother Herbert was a stocks and shares dealer. On 21 February 1895 at Christ Church, Surbiton Hill, Kingston he married Anna Christina Ravenhill (1871–1965) second daughter of W.W. Ravenhill of the Inner Temple. They had seven children, of whom one died at the Vicarage, Bradley, on 26 November 1895. Three days later on 29 November, Jerram had his overcoat stolen from a chapel during a choral rehearsal. By 1911 they were living at the Vicarage, Langford, Lechlade, Gloucestershire, in the Langford Berkshire parish. They had four of their children living with them, alongside a governess and two domestic servants. On 22 September 1914 he lost his son, Midshipman Harry E.R. Jerram, RN, aged 17, when HMS Hogue was torpedoed.

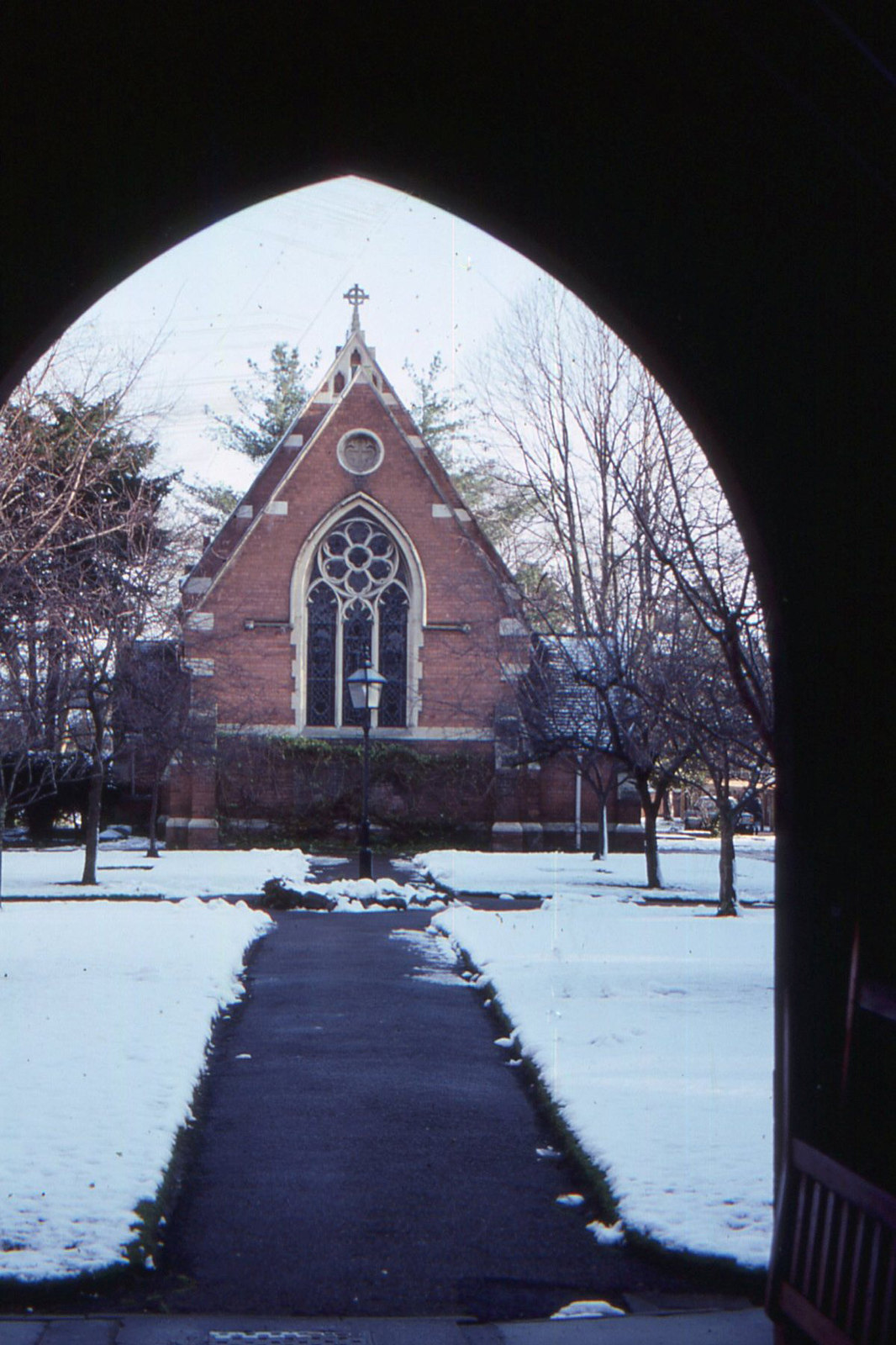
Chapel of St Oswald's Hospital, where he was chaplain at the end of his life

He was educated at Trinity College, Cambridge and received a third class B.A. degree in theology in 1891, and an MA in 1895. He trained at Leeds Clergy School, graduating in 1891. He was ordained deacon to St John the Evangelist, Wortley, Leeds; his first curacy, on Sunday 12 June 1892 at Ripon Cathedral by William Boyd Carpenter, Bishop of Ripon. On 17 September 1893 he was ordained priest, again by Carpenter. His MA degree was conferred at Cambridge on 17 January 1895. He was a Canon from 1929. He was curate of Wortley, Leeds, from 1892 to 1894, and of Coley, West Yorkshire from 1894 to 1895. From 29 June 1895 until 1906 he was perpetual curate of the Church of St Thomas, Bradley, West Yorkshire. He then became curate of St John the Baptist Church, Coley near Halifax, West Yorkshire. By 1901 at age 33 he was curate or vicar in the parish of St. Thomas's Church, Huddersfield. In July 1906 Arnold Escombe Jerram M.A. was instituted as vicar of Thurstonland, and he stayed until 1910. The Thurstonland living was worth £250 and a house, with a parish population of 867. While at Thurstonland he served on Thurstonland District Council; he was chairman of the Kirkburton section of the Huddersfield Board of Guardians, and was a member of the Wakefield Society of Mission Preachers. From 1910 to 1914 he was vicar of St Matthew's Church, Langford.

In Birmingham in April 1914 he gave up his Langford living to become the organising secretary of the Society for the Propagation of the Gospel, in the dioceses of Worcester, Birmingham and Lichfield, continuing until 1918. He was Secretary of the Diocesan Board of Finance 1918–1930. From 1930 until 1934 he was chaplain of St Oswald's Hospital, Worcester, and from 1927 to 1934 Honorary Canon of Worcester Cathedral, and honorary chaplain to the Bishop of Worcester, Arthur Perowne from 1930 to 1934. At the same time he was chaplain of St Oswald's Hospital, an almshouse residential post. He was Surrogate from 1932. He died on 6 June 1934 in his 67th year at St Oswald's Hospital, Worcester. He left £2,888 (net £2,830).

=== Philip Sydney Brown 1910–1923 ===
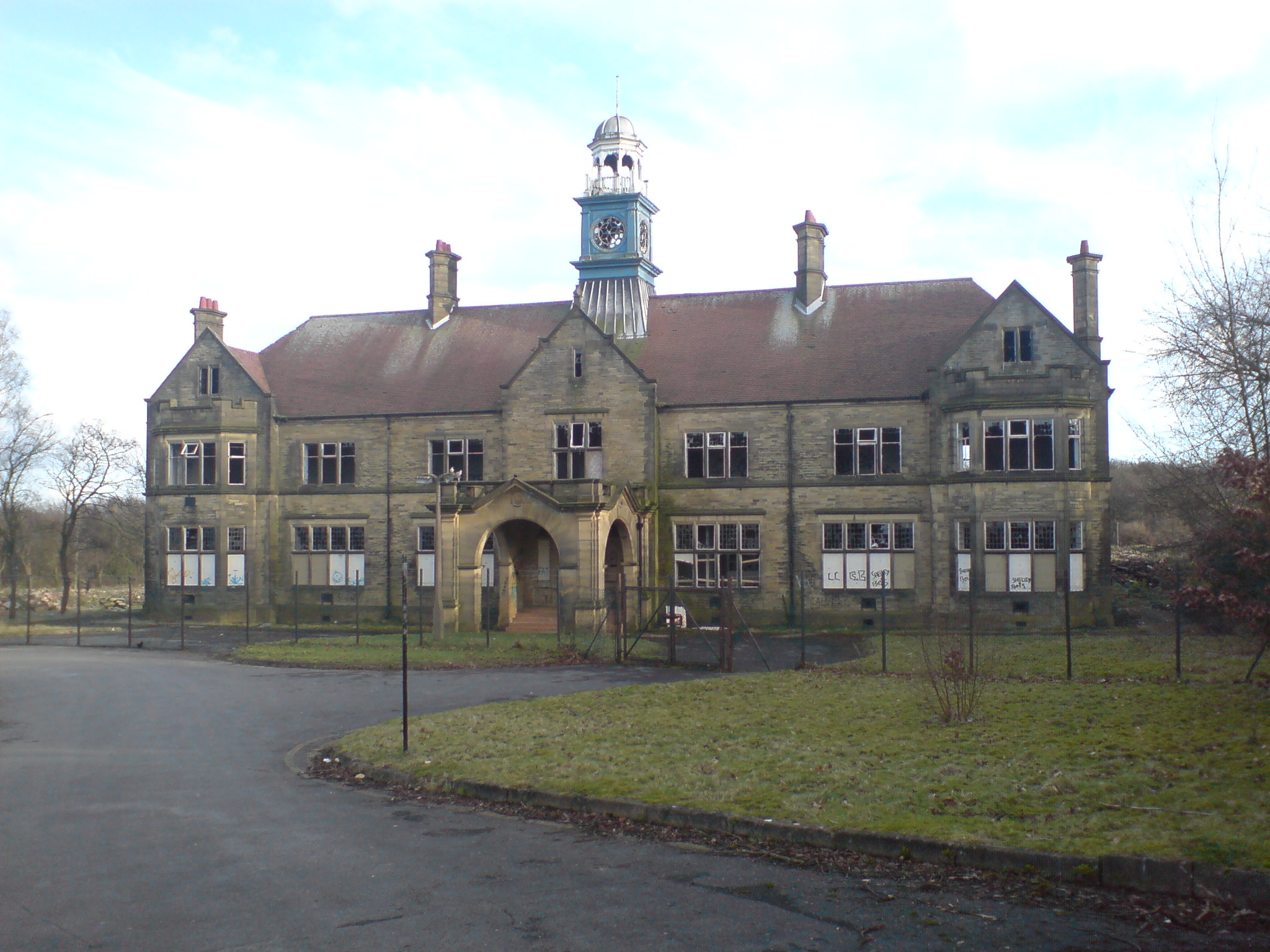
Brown was chaplain of Storthes Hall psychiatric Hospital

Philip Sydney Brown (1865–1938) was born at Aston in Birmingham. He married Beatrice Emily Lowrance (born 1876) at Barnsley in 1898 and had one daughter.

He graduated from Queen's College, Birmingham in 1886. He became deacon in 1888 and was ordained priest in 1889 by the bishop of Wakefield. He was curate of St John's Church, Dewsbury Moor from 1888 to 1896. From 1896 to 1910 he was vicar of Wrenthorpe, Wakefield; the living was worth £170 per year and a house, with a parish population of 2269. From 1910 to 1923 he was vicar of Thurstonland, and while there he was also chaplain at Storthes Hall Hospital. For some years he served on Thurstonland and Farnley Tyas Urban Council. From 1923 until his retirement in 1935 he was vicar of Birchencliffe, Huddersfield. Birchencliffe had a living of £402 per annum and a house, with a parish population which rose from 2471 to 2551 while he was there. From 1935 until he died he had permission to officiate within the diocese of York. He died at Scarborough in his 74th year on Sunday 23 October 1938.

=== Maurice Gerber 1923–1939 ===
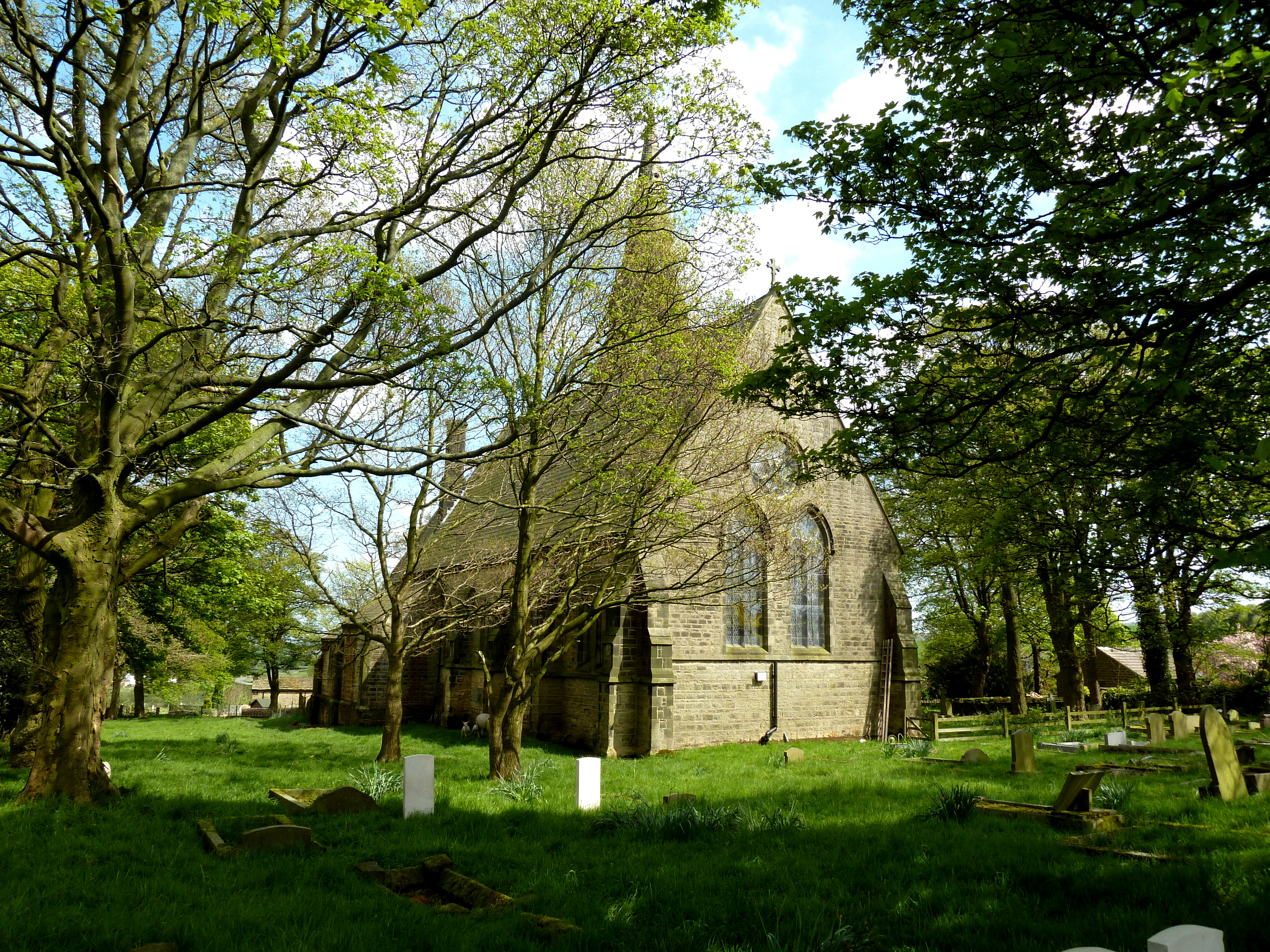
Gerber ministered at Thurstonland for 16 years

Maurice Gerber (1878–1967) had no England-Wales birth certificate and does not appear in any UK Census, so may have changed his name or was born abroad or at sea. In 1927 at Huddersfield he married Clara Winifred Maude Leech (2 April 1889 – 1971), eldest daughter of John Leech who was a previous vicar of Thurstonland.

In 1911 Gerber graduated from Durham University, gaining a Licentiate in Theology. In the same year he attended the London College of Divinity and was ordained deacon. He was ordained priest in 1912 by the Bishop of Carlisle. He was curate of Cleator Moor from 1911 to 1914, and between 1914 and 1921 he was curate of Rashcliffe, Huddersfield. He was curate of Almondbury from 1921 to 1924. He received a preferment to the vicarage of Thurstonland in December 1923 and remained in the post until 1939. At Thurstonland he received £345 and a house, raised to £350 later. The parish population rose from 1132 in 1934 to 3458 in his time there. He was chaplain of Storthes Hall psychiatric hospital and in charge of pensions there between 1924 and 1939. Between 1939 and 1948 he was vicar of Thurgoland, Sheffield, the living being worth £424 and a house, with a parish population of 1516. He was licensed to officiate in two local dioceses from 1950, while living at Betws-y-Coed. He died in 1967 in Conwy, Wales, aged 89 years.

=== Arthur Dilworth 1939–1943 ===
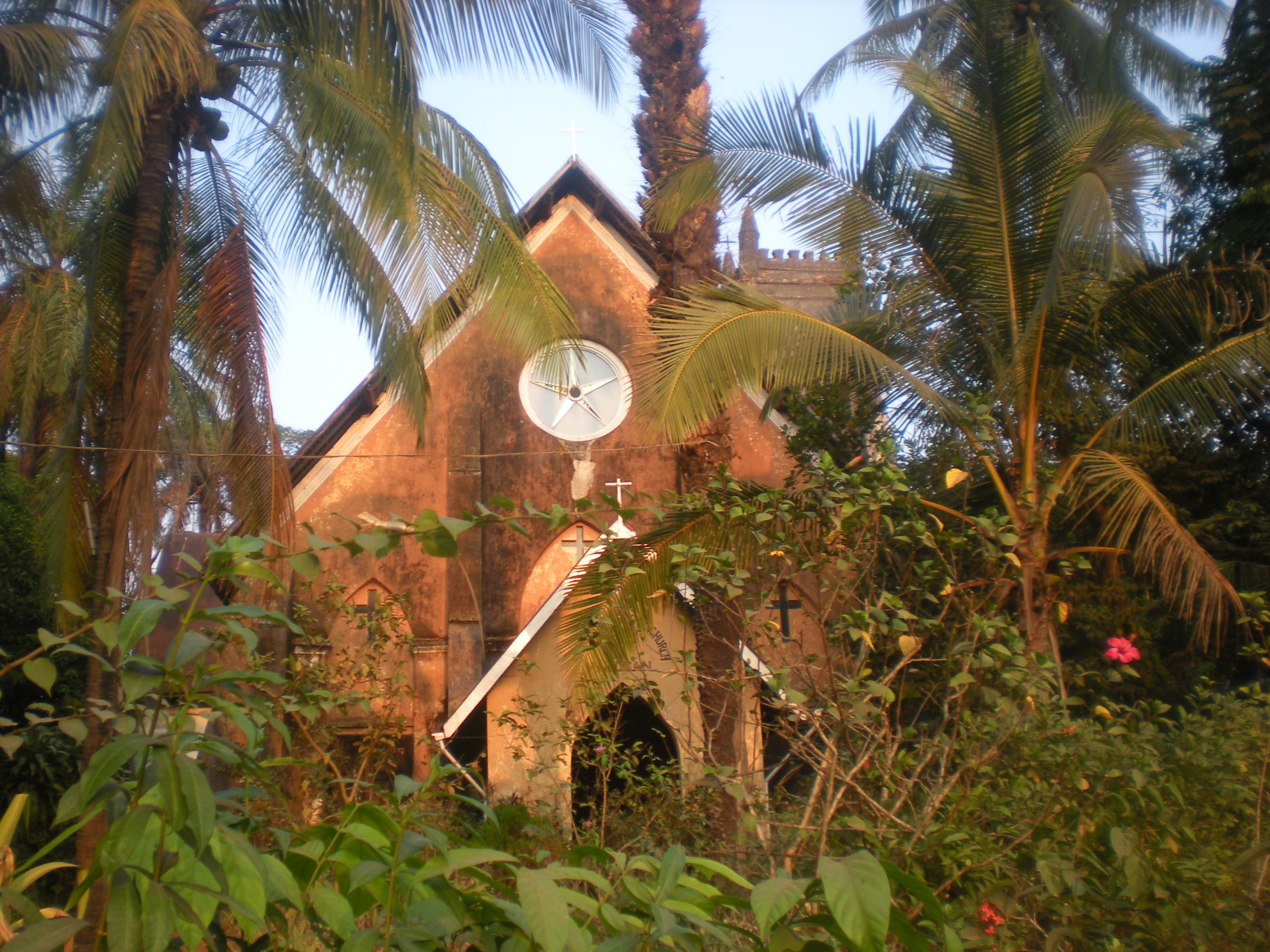
St Augustine's, Moulmein, where Dilworth was a missionary

Arthur Dilworth (22 July 1899 – 1989) was a scholar of Worcester College, Oxford, gaining a 2nd class classics and moderns qualification in 1921 with a BA in 1922, a 2nd class literature and humanities degree in 1923, and an MA in 1933. He was also at Wycliffe Hall, Oxford in 1923.

He was ordained deacon in 1924, and ordained priest in 1925 by Rodney Eden, Bishop of Wakefield. He was curate of Birstall 1924–1927. He was missionary at St Augustine's Mission at Moulmein, Burma 1927–1929. He was principal of the Divinity School at Kokine, Pegu, Burma 1930–1933. He had a furlough between 1933 and 1934, then he was Superintendent at St Michael's Delta Mission from 1934 to 1939. He was then chaplain of Bassein and examining chaplain to the Bishop of Rangoon from 1934 to 1939 when he returned to England to become vicar of Thurstonland and chaplain of Storthes Hall, with an income of £375 and house, and a parish population of 3458. He subsequently became chaplain in 1943 of the then-expanding parish of St Mary Magdalen, Knighton 1943–1945. He was chaplain of St Barnabas, Hove, Sussex from 1945 to 1947. He was vicar of Stone Cross 1947–1951, and vicar of Airedale with Fryston 1951 to 1953. He was rector of Hoggeston with Dunton 1953–1956, and vicar of Whaddon with Tattenhoe 1956–1962. He was rector of Great Horwood 1962 to 1964 and the same time rural dean of Mursley 1962–1964. He had permission to officiate in the same diocese 1960–1962, in the diocese of Salisbury 1964–1967, the diocese of Oxford from 1967 and the diocese of Wakefield from 1974. He died aged 90 years in 1989 in Scarborough.

=== Norman Gearey Hounsfield 1943–1949 ===
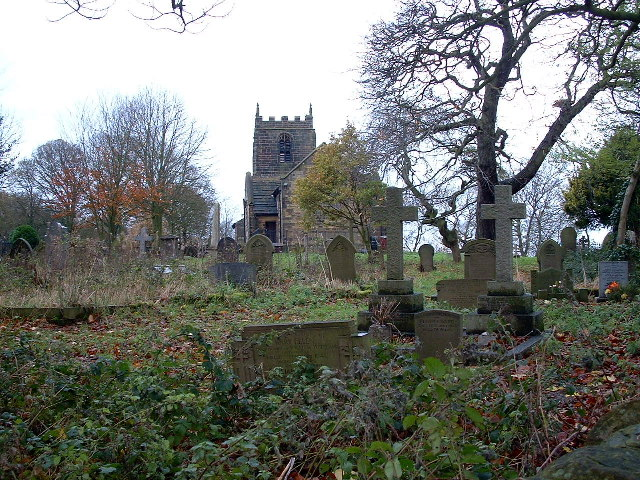
High Hoyland Church where Hounsfield was rector for 16 years

His father was John George Hounsfield (born 1844), a steel agent born in Tinsley, and his mother was Catherine Phoebe Harrison (born 1851). Norman Gearey Hounsfield (1883–1955) was born in Rotherham. By the age of 7 in 1891 he was living with his aunt Eleanor Geary at Watford, and by age 17 in 1901 he was still living in Watford, with his brother Francis Hounsfield. By age 27 in 1911 he was a clerk in holy orders, still living in Watford, but now with his widowed mother Catherine Hounsfield (born 1851). He married Edith Margaret Denholm (1888–1952) in Durham in 1913. She was born in Duns, Berwickshire, the eldest daughter of Scottish medical practitioner James Denholm (1859–1910. Before marriage she was a classical mistress in a secondary school. She died in Durham, leaving £8041 net. Their son Lieutenant Kenneth Denholm Hounsfield, aged 23 years, was killed in action in September 1944 during World War II.

He attended Guildhall Middle School at Bury St Edmunds, and in 1899 received a prize for French: a book on astronomy, Story of the Heavens by Robert Stawell Ball, 1886 He gained a Licentiate in Theology at Durham University in 1911, was ordained deacon in 1912, and ordained priest in 1913 by Brooke Foss Westcott, Bishop of Durham. He was curate of St Hilda, South Shields 1912–1915, and of Kelvedon 1915–1919. He was curate of Wanstead 1919–1920, then vicar of Walker 1920–1927. He was rector of High Hoyland with Clayton West 1927–1943, and was assistant rural dean of Huddersfield 1942–1949. He was vicar of Thurstonland 1943–1949. In 1943 the living was £375 (£400 by 1949) and house, with a parish population of 4132. From 1949 to 1955 he was licensed to officiate in the diocese of Durham. He died aged 71 years at Durham in 1955.

=== Ernest Parry 1950–1953 ===
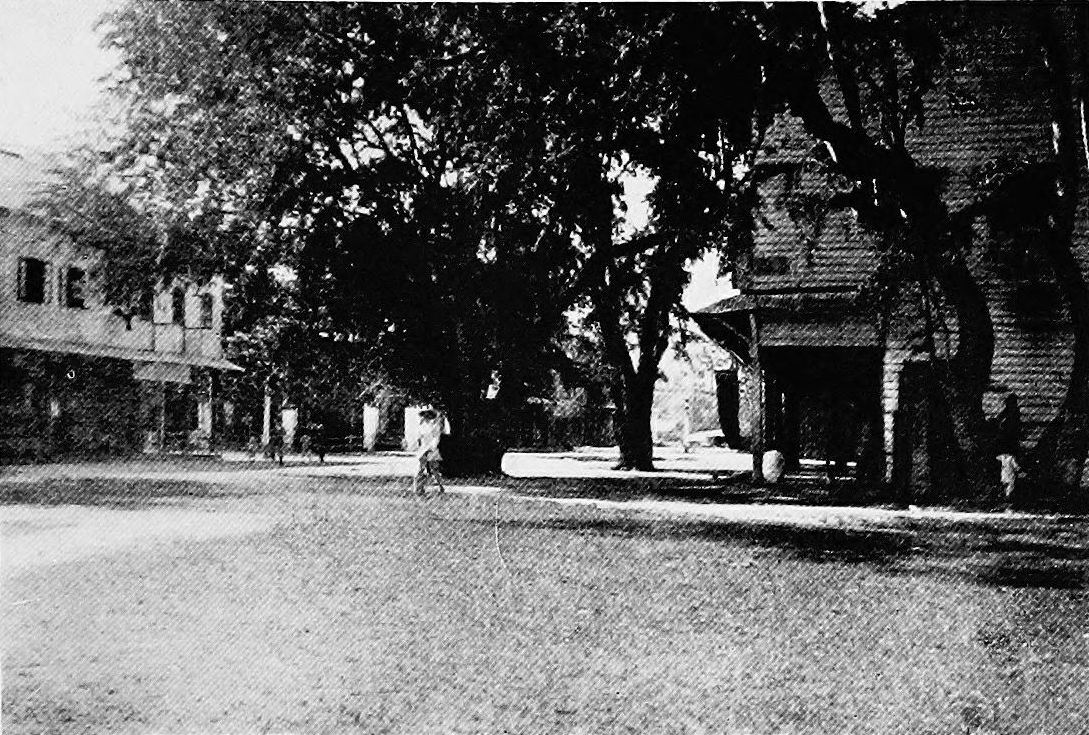
Kudat where Parry was a missionary to the Chinese

Ernest Parry graduated from St Aidan's College of the University of Durham in 1913. At Durham he obtained his Bachelor of Divinity in 1930. At the University of Leeds he gained another Bachelor of Divinity in 1940, and a Master of Arts in 1943. He was ordained deacon in 1914 by the Bishop of Richmond for Ripon, and was ordained priest in 1915 by the Bishop of Knaresborough for Ripon. He was curate of St Alban the Martyr, Leeds, 1914–1917, and of St Chad's Church, Far Headingley, 1917–1921.

He arrived in Kuching, Malaysia in May 1921 and volunteered to work with Chinese people. For this purpose he went to Kudat, Borneo, in November of the same year. There he immediately started to build a divinity school called the Holy Way or Shin Tau Yen, which was opened in January 1923. While supervising the construction work, he was also learning the local and Chinese languages. The building had a verandah, chapel, dining room, common-room and office on the ground floor, with ten more rooms above. Five Chinese people were prepared at the school for ordination, and by April 1927 there were three ordained Chinese priests and two Chinese deacons. Parry was principal of this school from 1921 to 1928, although he went on leave in 1925. He was rector of Kudat from 1926 to 1930, while at the same time replacing the now-dilapidated first Holy Way school with a second one. He left Kudat in 1930 for health reasons.

Back in the UK he was curate of Bramley, Leeds, including the curacy of Holy Trinity Hough End, 1930–1931. He was vicar of St Augustine's, Halifax, West Yorkshire, and chaplain for Halifax Poor Law Institute 1931–1938. He was vicar of Coley, West Yorkshire, 1938–1947, and of Marton 1947–1950. He was vicar of Thurstonland 1950–1953. In 1950 the Thurstonland living was £450 and a house, with a parish population of 4132. He returned on the evening of 21 October 1951 to St Chad's in Headingley as a visiting preacher; he had last preached there 30 years previously. He died in harness on Wednesday 26 August 1953. His funeral on 28 August at Thurstonland Church was attended by the Bishop of Pontefract who paid tribute to his life and ministry, the vicar of Farnley Tyas, the rector of Kirkheaton, Rev. A.T. Dangerfield of Holmfirth, Rev. A.T. Wellesley Greeves of Hepworth, Rev. H.E.S. Meanley of Cawthorne and Rev. C.T.D. Ellam of Lepton, besides his two married daughters.

Parry was the author of several books: How to Read the New Testament (1925); From Jerusalem to the Far East (1925); Borneo Essays (1925); Sermon Psychology (1930); Brief Sermons (1938). He was also editor of the following books: A Historical Survey of Christian Missions (1927); Holy Union (1930).

=== Philip Frederick Wainwright Frost 1953–1969 ===
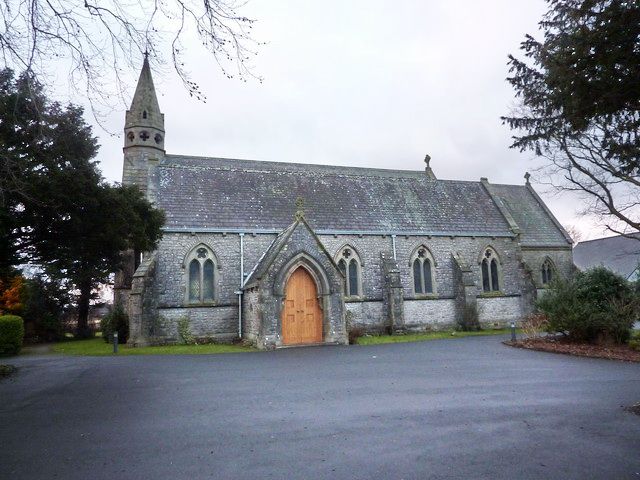
Allithwaite Church, Frost's last ministry

Philip Frederick Wainwright Frost (18 November 1920 – 1993) was born in Leeds. He married Ida M. Latimer in Ilkeston, Derbyshire in 1951.

He graduated from Keble College, Oxford with a 3rd class theology degree in 1942. At Oxford he received his BA in 1943, and his MA in 1946. He graduated from Queen's College, Birmingham in 1946. He was ordained deacon in 1948, and priest in 1949 by the Bishop of Derby. He was curate of Ilkeston 1948–1951, and curate of Holmfirth 1951–1953. He then became vicar of New Mill, West Yorkshire in 1953, and became concurrently vicar of Thurstonland in 1953. He stayed until 1969, living at New Mill Vicarage, Huddersfield. Following this he was vicar of Ainstable with Armathwaite in Cumbria 1969 to 1974. From 1974 to 1979 he was vicar of Flimby, then vicar of Allithwaite 1979–1985. He retired to Morecambe in 1985 and died in Lancaster in 1993 in his 73rd year.

=== Edward Harold Forshaw 1969–1973 ===
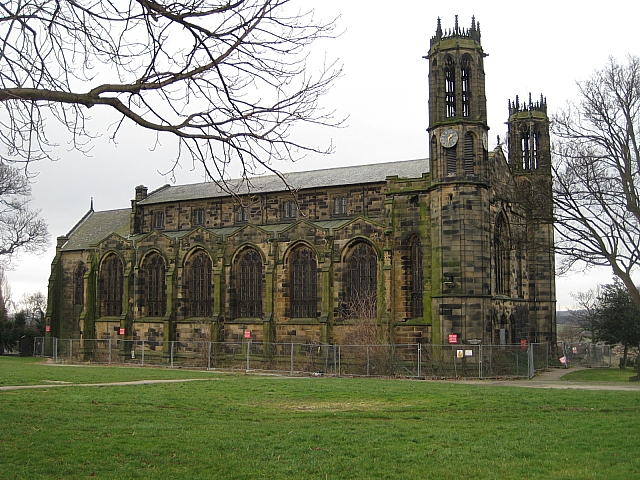
Forshaw was vicar of St Peter's, Stanley, demolished in 2014

Edward Harold Forshaw (1908–1980) was born at Birkenhead. He was the third child of barge waterman James Forshaw (born 1872 Butts Bridge; died 1909 Liverpool) and his wife Emma Forshaw nee Caffrey (born 1875). He married Doris Lowe at Kidderminster in 1945.

He graduated from Worcester Ordinary College in 1955. He was made deacon in 1956, and ordained priest in 1957 by the Bishop of Worcester. He was curate of St George, Redditch, 1956–1960, and of St Andrew's, Netherton, West Midlands from 1960 to 1963. He was vicar of Stanley, West Yorkshire, 1963–1969. He was vicar of New Mill including Thurstonland from 1969 to 1973. He died in 1980 at Wakefield in his 72nd year.

=== Raymond Laycock Wainwright 1974–1989 ===
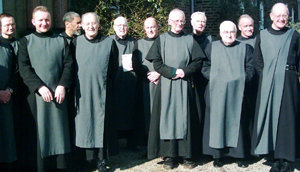
Members of the Community of the Resurrection, Mirfield

Raymond Laycock Wainwright (1925 - 25 April 2008) was born in Wakefield. He married Kathleen A. Tye in Loughborough in 1967. He later married Ann Marsh.

He joined the Community of the Resurrection in Mirfield in 1955. He was ordained deacon in 1956 and priest in 1957. He was curate of the Church of All Saints, Bingley, from 1956 to 1958. Then, while studying for his degree, he was curate of Almondbury 1958–1960. He gained his Bachelor of Divinity at the University of London in 1960. He was vicar of St Mary's, Gawthorpe and Chickenley Heath, near Dewsbury and Ossett, 1960–1974. He then became joint vicar of Christ Church, New Mill and Thurstonland 1974–1989. Between 1989 and 1991 he was team vicar for the same parishes. He retired in 1991 with permission to officiate in the Wakefield diocese from that date. He died on 25 April 2008 aged 83 at Huddersfield Royal Infirmary.

=== John Sean Robertshaw, from 1996 ===
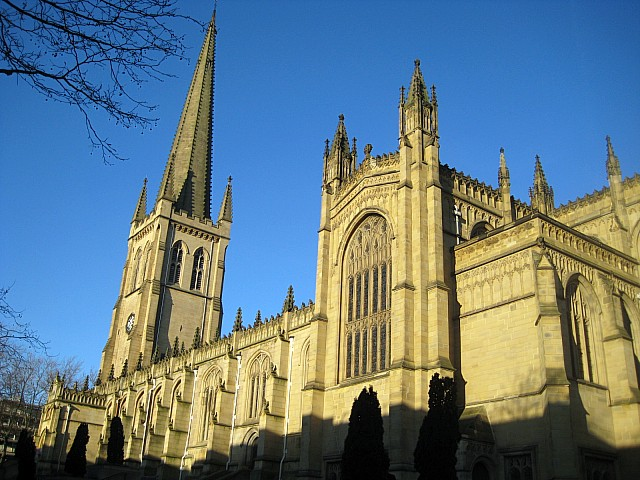
Robertshaw is Honorary Canon of Wakefield Cathedral

Rev. Canon John Sean Robertshaw was born in Huddersfield in 1966.

He graduated from Cranmer Hall, St John's College, Durham in 1990. He was ordained deacon in 1993, and ordained priest in 1994. He was curate of St Peter's parish church, Morley with Churwell, Wakefield, from 1993 to 1996. He then became team vicar for Upper Holme Valley, including Thurstonland, from 1996 to 2001. He was appointed Chaplain to the Forces for the Territorial Army in 1998. He was team rector for Upper Holme Valley 2001–2013. He was made Honorary Canon of Wakefield Cathedral on 8 September 2011. On 26 June 2012 he was appointed a director of Wakefield Diocesan Board of Education. In November 2012 he gained a postgraduate degree in theology and ministry at York St John University.

== Services and parochial activity ==
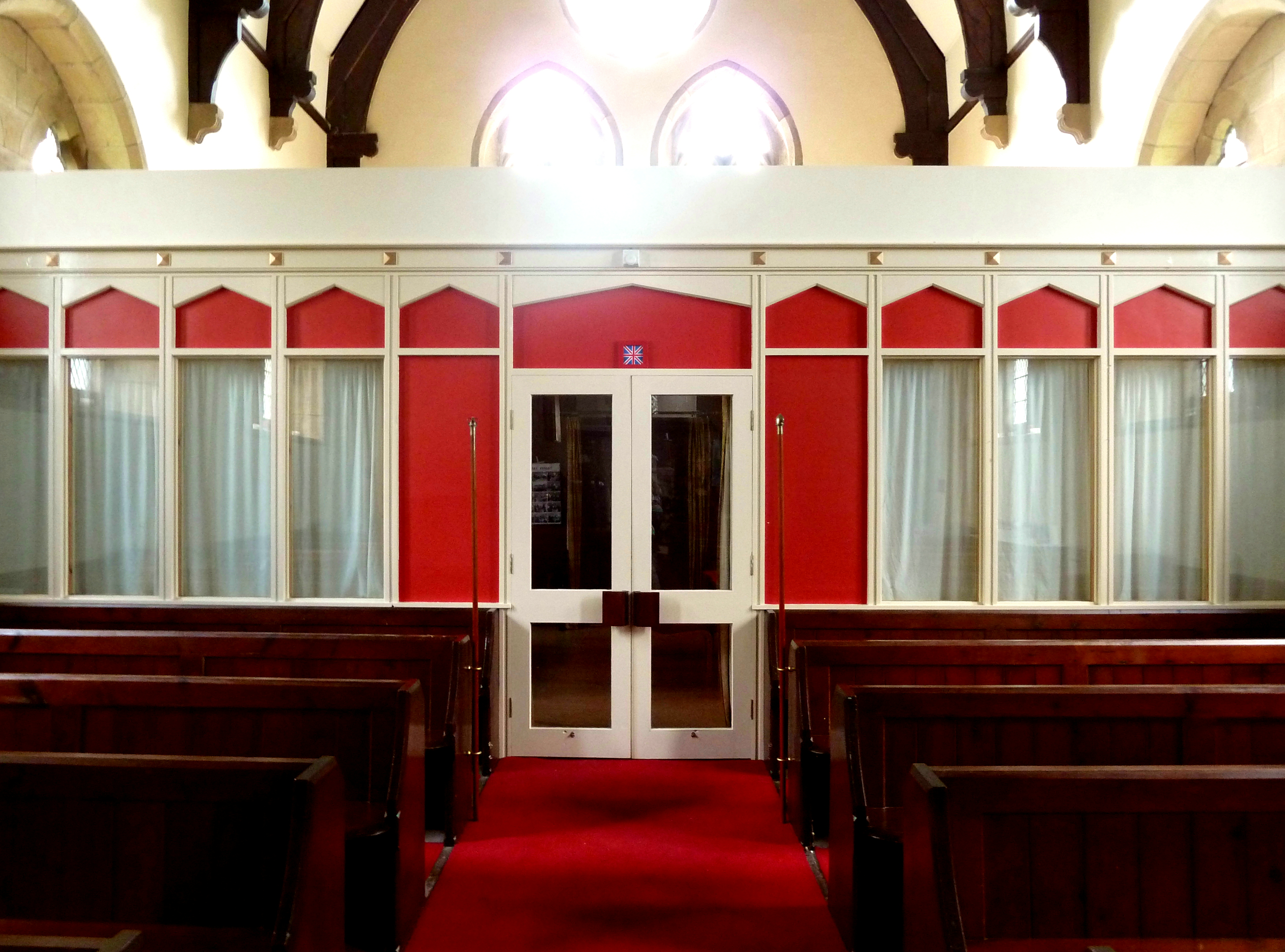
1980s Church Room in nave

This ministry serves Thurstonland and Stocksmoor, and works with the local community, including Thurstonland Endowed (VC) First School, the two village associations, and the local pub and cricket club. The following services occur regularly: all-age worship, holy communion and family communion. There is a regular sung eucharist, and also a children's church service twice a month. Lay people are involved in church services, in practical contribution such as flowers and refreshments, and in those local events such as music concerts and Harvest Festival which take place at St Thomas' church and in the Church Room at the back of the nave. The magazine Parish News, listing services and events, is distributed from the church building. The church is involved in charity work, and organises occasional family Sunday Fundays. It hosts Rainbows, Mothers' Union, a knitting group, a weekly coffee morning and a Sunday school. There is wheelchair access, toilets and disabled parking.

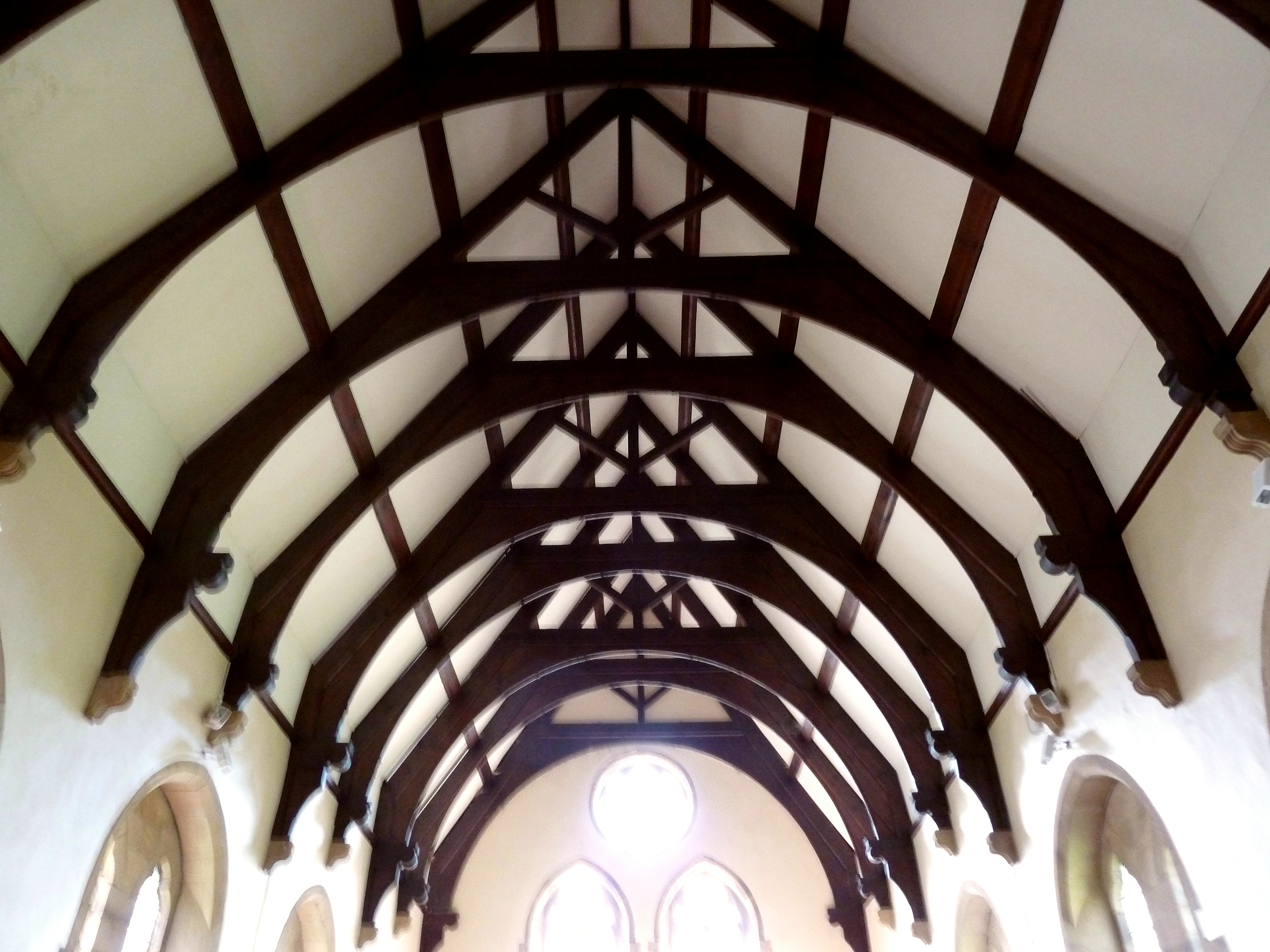
The arch-braced hammerbeam roof lit by clear-glazed windows since 1870
