= Trolleybuses in Huddersfield =

Huddersfield trolleybus system
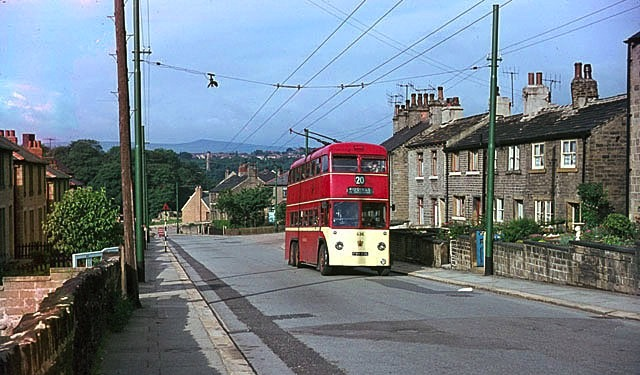
- Huddersfield trolleybus at the Newsome Road terminus, Newsome South, June 1966

Operation
- Locale: Huddersfield, West Yorkshire, England
- Open: 1933
- Close: 1968
- Status: Closed
- Routes: 15
- Operator: Huddersfield Corporation

Infrastructure
- Electrification: V DC parallel overhead lines
- Depots: St Thomas’ Rd, Longroyd Bridge
- Stock: 140 (maximum) - mostly 137 60-seat Karrier E6 (bought 1933-40, withdrawn 1946-63), 52 70-seat Karrier/Sunbeam MS2 (1947-52, 1964-67), 24 72-seat BUT (1952-56, and 10 72-seat Sunbeam S7 (1959, 1967-68). Most had Metrovick electrical equipment, with bodies by Brush, East Lancs, Park Royal, Roe and Weymann. All were 6-wheeled.

Statistics
- 1949: 61,255,937

The Huddersfield trolleybus system once served the market town of Huddersfield, in West Yorkshire, England. Opened on 4 December 1933, it gradually replaced the Huddersfield tramway network, which closed on Saturday, 29 June 1940.

By the standards of the various now-defunct trolleybus systems in the United Kingdom, the Huddersfield system was a medium-sized one, with a total of 15 routes and a maximum fleet of 140 trolleybuses. It was closed on 13 July 1968.

A notable feature of the system was the Longwood trolleybus turntable, which was one of only four such turntables ever to have been constructed worldwide (one of two in the United Kingdom). The turntable was manually operated, and was in use only in 1939–1940 until wartime conditions forced the introduction of other arrangements. However, it remained in situ until demolished in the 1980s.

Three of the former Huddersfield trolleybuses are now preserved, at the Trolleybus Museum at Sandtoft, Lincolnshire.

== History ==
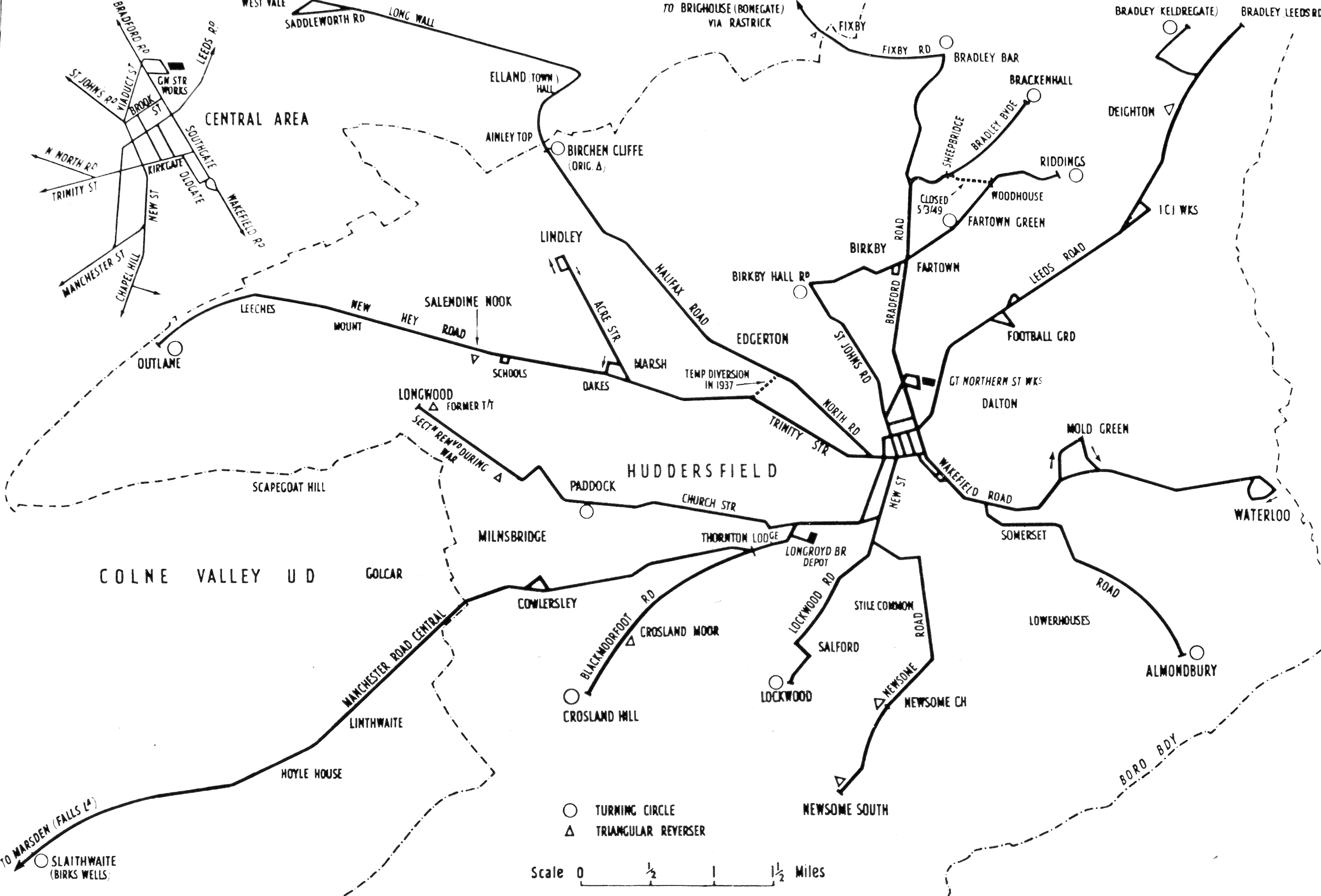
1933-1968 trolleybus routes

The first conversion was the 1.9 mi (3.1 km) Almondbury tramway. It was converted in sections with a temporary motor bus link as the road was resealed and electrified.

Six different 6-wheel buses were bought to trial on the route with Karrier, Ransomes and Sunbeam chassis and bodies by several builders. Most later buses were Karrier, though the local factory had closed.

The Almondbury route closed on 14 July 1965. The dates of the rest were:

Terminus	opened	closed	
Lindley and Outlane	11/11/34	13/7/68	
Newsome	2/5/37	13/7/66	
Crosland Hill	3/10/37	5/2/64	
Birkby/Fartown Bar	7/11/37	5/2/64	cut back to Wasp Nest Rd due to danger of using Woodbine Rd turning circle in wartime blackout.
Marsden	10/4/38	30/1/63	
Sheepridge	19/6/38	13/7/66	extended to new Brackenhall estate 5/3/49 and circular via Woodhouse closed.
Bradley	19/6/38	12/7/67	extended to Keldregate 2/4/56 using poles recovered from Brighouse section.
Woodhouse	19/6/38	13/7/66	extended to Riddings estate 5/3/49.
Lockwood	1/1/39	12/7/67	due to a low bridge the tram route to Honley was taken over by buses.
Longwood	12/1/39	13/7/66	
West Vale / Elland	28/5/39	8/11/61	
Fixby / Brighouse	30/6/40	14/7/65	cut back to Fixby 9/7/55 due to increasing traffic creating problems when reversing at Brighouse.

In 1958 Edgar Dyson became general manager. The council then agreed to a closure programme, ending with 5 crowded Outlane buses on 13 July 1968. Rates paid to the county council were among reasons for early closure of the West Vale and Marsden routes.

== Trolleybus fleet ==
Six experimental trolleybuses were bought in 1933, three of the chassis being ordered from the local firm of Karrier, with the others being one each by AEC, Ransomes, Sims & Jefferies and Sunbeam. The bodywork was by Brush, English Electric or Park Royal. Following trials on the route to Almondbury, quantity orders totalling 134 were placed for the Karrier E6 chassis, with bodywork mostly from Park Royal, but also Brush or Weymann, and these were delivered between 1934 and 1940. Several of these were given new Roe bodies during 1950–54. Sixty-six trolleybuses bought between 1947 and 1951 had the Sunbeam MS2 chassis (although badged as Karrier) with either Park Royal or Roe bodywork, and they were followed by 24 BUT 9641T with East Lancs bodies between 1953 and 1957. The final trolleybus order – and the last order by a UK operator for three-axle trolleybuses – was for ten Sunbeam S7 with East Lancs bodywork, built in 1959.

== See also ==
- Transport in Huddersfield
- List of trolleybus systems in the United Kingdom
