= Listed buildings in Huddersfield (Ashbrow Ward) =

Ashbrow is a ward of Huddersfield in the metropolitan borough of Kirklees, West Yorkshire, England. It contains 50 listed buildings that are recorded in the National Heritage List for England. Of these, one is listed at Grade II*, the middle of the three grades, and the others are at Grade II, the lowest grade. The ward is to the north of the centre of Huddersfield, and includes the districts of Ashbrow, Brackenhall, Bradley, Deighton, Fixby, Netheroyd Hill, and Sheepridge. The southern part of the ward is suburban and residential, and to the north is some parkland and countryside. The Huddersfield Broad Canal and the Kirklees Cut of the Calder and Hebble Navigation originate in the ward, and the River Calder passes through it; the listed buildings associated with these waterways include locks, bridges, a floodgate, a canal milestone, and a lock keeper's cottage. The former country house, Fixby Hall, later a golf clubhouse, is in the northwest part of the ward; this is listed, together with associated structures and the lodges at the entrances to its park. The other listed buildings include houses, cottages, and associated structures, farmhouses and farm buildings, another country house, churches and items in churchyards, the parapet of a ford, a road milestone, and two railway bridges.

== Key ==
Grade	Criteria
II*	Particularly important buildings of more than special interest
II	Buildings of national importance and special interest

== Buildings ==
Name and location	Photograph	Date	Notes	Grade
New House Hall; 53.67408°N 1.76664°W		c. 1550	A country house that has been altered, it is in stone with string courses and stone slate roof. There are two storeys and attics, and it has an H-shaped plan, consisting of a hall range and flanking gabled cross-wings. The hall range has a moulded eaves cornice and a high parapet with three ball finials, and it contains mullioned and transomed windows, and a doorway with a moulded and shouldered surround and a monolithic lintel. Elsewhere the windows are mullioned and transomed or mullioned, the gables have ornamental finials, and at the rear is a doorway with a chamfered surround and a monolithic triangular-shaped lintel.	II*
Bradley Hall; 53.68712°N 1.74334°W	—	17th century	Originally a laithe house, it was rebuilt and extended in the 19th century. The older part is in stone, the extension is in red brick, and the roof is of stone slate. The house has two storeys and three bays, and contains a doorway and mullioned windows. The barn contains a segmental-headed barn door, and a doorway with chamfered jambs and a lintel.	II
Fell Greave Farmhouse; 53.67604°N 1.77303°W		17th or early 18th century	A row of three houses, the farmhouse the earliest, and the other houses added later. They are in stone with a stone slate roof, two storeys and seven bays. The windows on the front are mullioned casements, and at the rear are sash windows and an outshut.	II
142 Bradley Road, Bradley; 53.68241°N 1.74555°W	—	18th century	A stone house with a stone slate roof, two storeys, and an outhouse to the right. There are two doorways, and most of the windows are mullioned sashes.	II
Bradley Grange; 53.68286°N 1.74697°W	—	18th century	A stone house with a stone slate roof, two storeys and four bays. In the ground floor are sash windows, and the windows elsewhere are mullioned casements.	II
Barn, Bradley Grange; 53.68273°N 1.74717°W	—	18th century	The barn is in stone with a stone slate roof. It contains mullioned windows of various types.	II
Barn, Shepherd's Thorn Farm; 53.68351°N 1.76916°W	—	18th century (or earlier)	The barn is in stone with a stone slate roof, catslide at the rear, two storeys, and an aisle. It contains doorways and windows. In the west part is a cellar, and the upper floor is a fireplace.	II
Canal milestone 53.69151°N 1.74367°W	—	18th century (presumed)	The milestone is on the towpath of the Kirklees Cut of the Calder and Hebble Navigation 100 yards northwest of Kirklees Low Lock. It consists of a stone inscribed "100 yds".	II
Tower in courtyard, Fixby Hall; 53.67141°N 1.80187°W	—	18th century	The tower in the stable courtyard is in stone with a band, a hipped stone slate roof, and two storeys. On three sides are lunettes, and the fourth side contains a doorway with a loft door above.	II
Kirklees Low Lock; 53.69028°N 1.74145°W		18th century	The lock is at the eastern entrance to the Kirklees Cut of the Calder and Hebble Navigation from the River Calder. It has stone retaining walls, stone and wooden bollards, mooring irons, and two pairs of lock gates.	II
Parapet, Ochre Hole Ford; 53.67252°N 1.79095°W		18th century (probable)	The ford carries Allison Dyke across Cowcliffe Hill Road. It its lower end is a stone parapet through which the stream flows.	II
33–37 Oak Road, Bradley; 53.67977°N 1.74207°W		1751	A stone house with a stone slate roof, two storeys and two bays. Above the central doorway is an ornamental plaque with two fluted pilasters, a moulded arch with a keystone and a moulded cornice, inscribed with initials and the date. In each floor are two four-light mullioned casement windows.	II
Fixby Hall; 53.67161°N 1.80078°W		Mid or late 18th century	A country house that was extended in the 19th century, it is in stone with a modillioned eaves cornice, a parapet, balustrades with vase-shaped balusters, and a hipped stone slate roof. There are two storeys and originally an L-shaped plan with later infilling at the rear. The windows are sashes with raised surrounds. In the east front are four bays, with flanking protruding wings ending in canted bay windows. The south front has eight bays, and includes a doorway with a moulded surround, a pulvinated frieze, and a triangular pediment on moulded consoles, the north front has five bays, and at the rear are two canted bay windows.	II
Lock No. 1 (Cooper Bridge Lock); 53.68131°N 1.73488°W		1774–80	The lock is at the entrance to the Huddersfield Broad Canal from the River Calder, and was altered in 1899. The walls are partly in stone and partly in grey brick, there are iron mooring hooks, and the gates are wooden. At the north end is a bridge with a flat iron span on piers of stone and grey brick.	II
Lock No. 2; 53.67885°N 1.73358°W		1774–80	The lock is on the Huddersfield Broad Canal. The walls are in stone, there are iron mooring hooks, and two wooden gates.	II
Lock No. 3 (Johnson's Lock); 53.67306°N 1.74212°W		1774–80	The lock is on the Huddersfield Broad Canal. The walls are in stone, there are iron mooring hooks, and the gates are wooden. At the north end is a stone bridge that has a depressed arch, a string course, a parapet, and stone setts.	II
Lock No. 4; 53.66942°N 1.74474°W		1774–80	The lock is on the Huddersfield Broad Canal. The walls are in stone, there are iron mooring hooks, and two wooden gates. At the northeast end is a stone bridge with a depressed arch and a string course.	II
Lock No. 5 (Hall Wood Lock); 53.66701°N 1.75590°W		1774–80	The lock is on the Huddersfield Broad Canal. The walls are in stone, there are iron mooring hooks, and the gates are wooden. The overflow is separated from the lock by a cutwater.	II
Leeds Road Bridge; 53.66763°N 1.74928°W		1774–80	The bridge carries Leeds Road (A62 road) over the Huddersfield Broad Canal. It is in stone, and consists of a single depressed skew arch. Reinforced concrete cantilevered footpaths have been added to the sides.	II
Colne Road Bridge; 53.67814°N 1.73457°W		1775	The bridge carries Colne Bridge Road over the Huddersfield Broad Canal. It is in stone, and consists of a single segmental arch. The bridge has a dated voussoir, string courses, and a parapet.	II
Cooper Bridge Floodgate; 53.68311°N 1.73586°W		Late 18th century	The floodgates are at the entry to the Cooper Bridge Cut from the River Calder. There are massive stone retaining walls with rusticated coping, and shallow access for the gates.	II
Coach house range, Fixby Hall; 53.67146°N 1.80212°W	—	Late 18th century	The coach house range is in sandstone, and has a moulded cornice and a hipped stone slate roof. There is one storey and an attic. The central part projects, it has a parapet with four ball finials, it contains three arched openings with moulded voussoirs and plain imposts, and in the outer parts are doorways.	II
Stable Range, Fixby Hall; 53.67151°N 1.80169°W	—	Late 18th century	The stable range is in sandstone, and has a continuous impost band, an eaves cornice, and a hipped stone slate roof. There are two storeys, a front of nine bays, the middle three bays projecting under a pediment, and flanking single-storey single-bay wings. In the centre is a round-arched yard entrance with moulded voussoirs. The windows are sashes, those in the ground floor with arched heads; some have plain surrounds and others have moulded surrounds. The wings have cornices with ball finials at the ends.	II
Gateway and lodges, Fixby Park; 53.67337°N 1.81751°W		Late 18th century	At the western entrance to the park is an archway flanked by lodges, all in stone. The semicircular archway has rusticated jambs and voussoirs, moulded impost bands, a moulded cornice, and a parapet. The gates are in iron and have spear finials. Walls link the archway to the lodges, which have pilaster quoins, and each lodge has a triangular pediment over a rusticated arch containing a sash window.	II
North Lodge Farmhouse; 53.67789°N 1.80269°W	—	Late 18th century	A pair of cottages, later combined, the building is in stone, and has a stone slate roof with coped gables. There are two storeys, three bays, and a single-storey single-bay extension on the right. In each outer bay is a doorway with monolithic jambs, in the main part of the house are three-light mullioned windows, and the extension contains a sash window.	II
1 and 3 Woodhouse Hill, Fartown; 53.66500°N 1.77459°W	—	1787	A pair of houses in painted stone with a stone slate roof and two storeys. The windows are mullioned and contain sashes and casements.	II
Orangery, Fixby Hall; 53.67347°N 1.80361°W	—	1790–91 (probable)	The orangery has a stone front. with a continuous plain impost, a moulded eaves cornice, and a blocking course, the rear is in red brick, and the hipped roof is in slate. There is one storey and seven bays, the middle three bays projecting slightly under a pediment with a relief sculpture in the tympanum. On the front is an arcade of round-headed arches. the outer two arches blocked, the middle bay containing a doorway, and the others with sash windows. At the top is a frieze with paterae, and garlanded urns.	II
Ice house, Fixby Hall; 53.67028°N 1.80299°W	—	1796	The ice house is in stone on the exterior, and is lined with red brick. The doorway has a monolithic lintel, and leads to a tunnel vaulted passage and a circular chamber with a domical vault about 15 feet (4.6 m) in diameter.	II
182 Netheroyd Hill Road, Netheroyd Hill; 53.66827°N 1.78763°W	—	18th or early 19th century	A stone house with a stone slate roof, two storeys, and mullioned windows. In the ground floor is a three-light window, and the upper floor contains two two-light windows.	II
Ivy House; 53.67036°N 1.78712°W	—	18th or early 19th century	Originally a laithe house, it is in stone, partly rendered, with a stone slate roof. The house has two storeys, and the windows are modern. The barn is to the north and has an outshut.	II
Christ Church, Woodhouse; 53.66754°N 1.76930°W		1823–24	The church was designed by Thomas Taylor in Early English style, and the chancel was replaced in 1901. The church is built in sandstone with slate roofs, and has a cruciform plan, consisting of a nave, a south porch, north and south transepts, a chancel, a north east vestry, and a west steeple. The steeple has a tower with three stages, angle buttresses, a west window above which is a niche containing a statue, and a clock face. At the top is a Lombard frieze, and the tower is surmounted by a broach spire with lucarnes. The windows are lancets, and at the east end is a window of five stepped lancets.	II
15 Lightridge Road, Netheroyd Hill; 53.67173°N 1.78613°W	—	Early 19th century	A stone house with a stone slate roof, one storey, and mullioned casement windows. The front has been altered, and at the rear are three two-light and two three-light windows.	II
Christ Church Vicarage; 53.66770°N 1.77043°W	—	Early 19th century	The vicarage is in stone with a moulded string course, coped eaves, and a slate roof with coped gables, catslide at the rear. There are two storeys, a double depth plan, and three bays, the middle bay projecting slightly, and it has a gable with pointed finial shield. The porch has a coped gable and contains a door that has a fanlight with chamfered surround, a pointed head, and Gothic tracery. The windows are sashes, and they have chamfered surrounds, pointed heads, and Gothic tracery.	II
Milestone opposite 523 Bradford Road; 53.67358°N 1.77873°W		Early 19th century	The milestone is on the east side of Bradford Road (A641 road). It consists of a stone with a triangular plan inscribed on two sides with the distance to and from Huddersfield.	II
Ivy Cottage; 53.66528°N 1.77376°W	—	Early 19th century	A stone house with a stone slate roof and one storey. The gable end faces the street and has a pediment with an oval plaque in the tympanum, scroll-shaped kneelers, and a Venetian window.	II
Rosery Cottage; 53.66657°N 1.77901°W	—	Early 19th century	The cottage is in stone with a stone slate roof. There are two storeys, and it contains one range of four-light mullioned sash windows.	II
Lock keeper's cottage, Cooper Bridge Lock; 53.68132°N 1.73508°W		Early to mid 19th century (probable)	The lock keeper's cottage is adjacent to Cooper Bridge Lock on the Huddersfield Broad Canal. It is in stone with a stone slate roof, two storeys and three bays. On the front is a central doorway, and the windows are sashes, some blocked.	II
Lodge, Fixby Park; 53.67641°N 1.79097°W	—	Early to mid 19th century	The lodge at the eastern entrance to the park is in stone with a hipped slate roof. There is one storey and sides of two bays. The windows are tripartite casements with moulded cornices in semicircular relieving arches.	II
Colliery Lane Bridge; 53.67495°N 1.74271°W	—	1845–49	The bridge was built by the Huddersfield and Manchester Railway to carry Colliery Lane over its line, and was expanded by the addition of a span in 1881–84 by the London and North Western Railway. It is in gritstone, and consists of two segmental arches with voussoirs, keystones, string courses, and coped parapets ending in rectangular piers. The abutments have quoins, and there are canted buttresses on the central pier and at the ends of the bridge.	II
Colne Bridge; 53.67872°N 1.73522°W	—	1845–49	The bridge was built by the Huddersfield and Manchester Railway to carry Colne Bridge Road (B1168 road) over its line, and was widened in 1881–84 by the London and North Western Railway. It is in gritstone and engineering brick, and consists of three segmental arches and a smaller arch over a cutting. The bridge has voussoirs, keystones, string courses, and coped parapets ending in rectangular piers. The ends of the arches are supported by buttresses.	II
250 Deighton Road, Riddings; 53.67057°N 1.76416°W	—	Mid 19th century	A stone house with rusticated quoins, a moulded eaves cornice, and a slate roof. There are two storeys and two bays. The doorway has a rectangular fanlight, Tuscan columns, and a full entablature. To the right is a canted bay window with a moulded cornice and arched sash windows, and in the upper floor are two pairs of arched sash windows.	II
Barn, Fell Greave Farm; 53.67626°N 1.77327°W	—	19th century	The barn is in stone and has a stone slate roof. There are opposing arched doorways, an outshut on the south side, and extensions with cart sheds to southeast and southwest.	II
Cartshed north of coach house, Fixby Hall; 53.67163°N 1.80197°W	—	19th century	The cartshed is in sandstone and has a lean-to roof in stone slate. There is an open front carried on iron columns.	II
Outbuilding north of Fixby Hall; 53.67185°N 1.80093°W	—	Mid 19th century	The outbuilding is in stone with overhanging eaves on stone brackets, and a slate roof. There are two storeys, and in the centre is a louvred clerestory with a hipped roof. The windows have arched heads, voussoirs and imposts, there is one door with a vermiculated lintel, and one with a vermiculated keystone.	II
Fixby House; 53.67197°N 1.78400°W	—	Mid 19th century	A stone house with a hipped slate roof, two storeys and three bays. The central doorway has Tuscan pilasters, an entablature, and a fanlight, and the windows are sashes.	II
Longwoodhouse Farmhouse; 53.67334°N 1.78340°W	—	Mid 19th century	A stone house with a stone slate roof, two storeys, and a symmetrical front of three bays. The central doorway has Tuscan pilasters, an entablature, and a fanlight. The windows are sashes, and at the rear is a round-headed staircase window.	II
Monument to Richard Oastler; 53.66750°N 1.76947°W	—	Mid 19th century	The monument is in the churchyard of Christ Church, Woodhouse, near the south door of the church. It consists of a tabernacle in Gothic style, surmounted by a crocketed spire.	II
Former St Thomas' Church; 53.67766°N 1.74058°W		1859–63	The church was designed by W. H. Crossland in Decorated style, the steeple was added in 1865, the north aisle in 1879, and the southwest porch in 1891. The church is built in sandstone with a roof of Westmorland slate, and consists of a nave, north and south aisles, a south porch, a chancel with a south vestry and a north organ chamber, and a south steeple. The steeple has a tower with three stages, a southeast turret, clock faces, and a broach spire. At the west end of the church is a doorway, over which is a rose window, at the east end of the nave are two turrets with conical caps, and the east window has five lights. The church is now redundant and used for other purposes.	II
Gate pier, St Thomas' Church; 53.67750°N 1.74083°W	—	1863 (presumed)	The gate pier is in stone and has a pointed top with a geometrical pattern in shallow relief.	II
Monument to William Fawcett; 53.66758°N 1.76967°W	—	1868	The monument is in the churchyard of Christ Church, Woodhouse, to the west of the tower. It consists of a plain stone pyramid.	II
