= Kirkburton branch =

Former railway line in Yorkshire, England

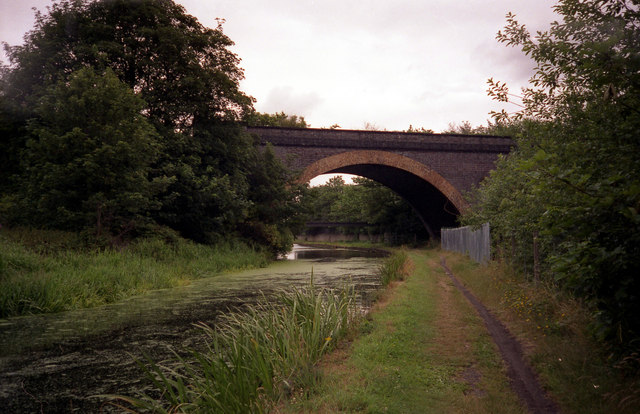
- Railway bridge over the Huddersfield Broad Canal at the northern end of the line

Overview
- Status: Closed
- Locale: Kirkburton, West Riding of Yorkshire, England
- Stations: 4

Service
- Type: Heavy rail
- Operator(s): LNWR (1867–1923); LMS (1923–1948); BR (1948–1965/1971)

History
- Opened: 7 October 1867 (passengers); 1 January 1868 (goods)
- Closed: 28 July 1930 (passengers); 1971 (goods)

Technical
- Line length: 6 mi (9.7 km)
- Track length: 4.25 mi (6.84 km)
- Number of tracks: 1 (Provision for two)
- Track gauge: 4 ft 8 1/2 in (1,435 mm) standard gauge
- Operating speed: 40 mph (64 km/h)

The Kirkburton branch was a railway branch in West Yorkshire, England. The line was built by the London and North Western Railway (LNWR) in the 1860s, the only LNWR branch line in the Huddersfield area, although originally, the intention had been to link Kirkburton with Clayton West and through to Barnsley, but this never came to fruition. The line opened to traffic in 1867, and was closed to passengers in 1930. Freight carried on using the branch until 1965. A second railway station for Deighton was opened in 1982 on the main running line between Huddersfield and Mirfield. The removal of passenger services along the branch was down to low passenger numbers; the railway ran along the valley floor and most of the populated areas were high up on the valley sides.

== History ==
The line was authorised by an Act of Parliament in July 1863, with the LNWR only pressing ahead with building the branch because the Midland Railway were considering building a line from Barnsley to Huddersfield, connecting through Clayton West and Kirkburton. This proposal worried the Lancashire & Yorkshire Railway (L&YR), and prompted them to build the line to Clayton West, offering the Midland Railway running powers over their lines connecting Huddersfield to the south. As the through-line proposals fell through, the Kirkburton line remained as a branch only, the only LNWR branch line in the Huddersfield area, where the L&YR operated most branches. A year after the bill went through Parliament, a pub in Kirkburton was renamed the Railway Junction Inn. The area was known as the Junction before this time, but it was still hoped that Kirkburton would become a through station as opposed to a terminus.

Despite consent to build the line being passed in 1863, it wasn't until March 1865 that work on the branch began. The formation of the line was built wide enough to accommodate two tracks, however, apart from the double track section at Deighton which connected to the main line, only one track was ever laid. The major engineering structure on the line was Whitacre Mill Viaduct at Deighton, which ran on a curve across the Huddersfield Broad Canal, a drain, and the River Colne for 177 yards (162 m). Another shorter viaduct was built at Rowley between Fenay Bridge and Kirkburton. Two of the arches of the viaduct at Whitacre Mill collapsed during construction, which delayed the line's opening and added to the cost.

The 4.25-mile (6.84 km) branch was opened to passenger traffic in 1867, (goods traffic did not start until January 1868) and ascended the valley at an average gradient of 1-in-66. With the additional section from Deighton into Huddersfield, the total line length was just over 6 miles (9.7 km). Less than a month after opening, there was an accident at the Deighton end of Whitacre Mill Viaduct. A train derailed on the formation which leads to the double track, and it ploughed onwards but stayed upright. There were no reports of injuries and the passengers walked to the main line junction where a passing train from Normanton stopped to pick them up and take them into Huddersfield.

The branch had just four stations; Deighton, Kirkheaton, Fenay Bridge & Lepton, and the terminus at Kirkburton, although Deighton did not open with the line; it was opened in August 1871. The station at Kirkburton was actually in the settlement of Highburton, and up until 1871, and the second station on the line was known just as Fenay Bridge. Fenay Bridge was built without a goods yard, something which was commented upon in the local paper, with a correspondent pointing out that the area was host to 20 mills within 1-mile (1.6 km) of the station. The main settlement at Kirkburton was 400 yards (370 m) above the station area, its distance from the main housing area being one of the reasons for early closure by the LMS (the operating company by 1930) on account of its remoteness, and buses being more direct into Huddersfield. The other stations were similarly badly positioned as the railway ran along the valley floor, with most housing being high up on the valley walls. Deighton was like the rest of the stations on the line in that it only had the one platform. By June 1916, a second platform had been installed on the west side of the curved line leading to the main Huddersfield to Heaton Lodge Junction railway. A workers halt was used at the British Dye works near to Deighton during the First World War. It was used solely by people travelling from either Kirkburton, Fenay Bridge or Kirkheaton; workers from Huddersfield used the tram system.

Freight traffic consisted of chemicals to the dye works, coal out from the collieries on the line, and domestic coal in. During the First World War, the chemical works at Deighton sent out over 1,000,000 tonnes (1,100,000 tons) of acids and explosive, whilst a fireworks factory at Fenay, made over ten million hand grenades. Other general freight was also carried and the line had an operating speed of 40 miles per hour (64 km/h) in the 1930s. Between Kirkheaton and Fenay Bridge was the site of Tandem Goods Yard. This was a wide expanse of land on the west side of the line which was intended to be a large goods yard when the line was extended to Barnsley. As this never occurred, just two lines were laid facing northwards.

The Kirkburton branch closed to passengers in 1930, with coal traffic from Lodge Mill Colliery ceasing in the same year. Other industrial concerns kept the branch alive for another 35 years, with the final train running on 2 April 1965, and closure coming three days later. After final closure of most of the line, a short spur through the old Deighton station was retained until February 1971 for traffic to a chemical works. A new station at Deighton opened up to traffic on 26 April 1982, on the northernmost lines of the old quadrupled track section between Huddersfield and Heaton Lodge Junction. The station is quite close to the old Deighton station, and the modern platforms are located on the site of the old Kirkburton Junction. The southernmost lines, where the Kirkburton branch joined at what was called Kirkburton Junction, will be re-opened as part of the Trans-Pennine Route Upgrade. The remainder of the route is now used as a walking and cycle path.

== Services ==
The service pattern upon the opening of the line was six rains per day, out and back to Huddersfield. A timetable from March 1873, shows the branch having eight services out and back to and from Huddersfield, with one extra service to Kirkburton on a Saturday. Nine years later, in August 1879, the branch had ten out and back workings between Huddersfield and Kirkburton, with a seven-minute layover at Kirkburton before the train returned to Huddersfield. Timings were typically between 18 and 20 minutes for each direction.

By 1887, services along the branch amounted to ten services each way, with an extra service on Tuesdays and Saturdays. In 1925, services amounted to eleven trains each way per weekday, and two trains on a Saturday. By 1922, one year before grouping, the service pattern remained at either eleven or twelve services, dependent on days of the week.

The passenger train along the branch was known locally as Kirkburton Dick, often being run as an autotrain.
