= DHN =

DHN may refer to:

- DHN, the IATA and FAA LID code for Dothan Regional Airport, Alabama, United States
- DHN, the Indian Railways station code for Dhanbad Junction railway station, Jharkhand, India
- DHN, the National Rail station code for Deighton railway station, West Yorkshire, England
