= Listed buildings in Huddersfield =

The listed buildings in Huddersfield are arranged by wards as follows:

- Listed buildings in Huddersfield (Ashbrow Ward)
- Listed buildings in Huddersfield (Dalton Ward)
- Listed buildings in Huddersfield (Greenhead Ward)
- Listed buildings in Huddersfield (Lindley Ward)
- Listed buildings in Huddersfield (Newsome Ward – central area)
- Listed buildings in Huddersfield (Newsome Ward – outer areas)
