= Kirkburton railway station =

Disused railway station in West Yorkshire, England

Kirkburton

General information
- Location: Kirkburton, Kirklees; England
- Coordinates: 53.6152°N 1.7134°W

Other information
- Status: Disused

History
- Opened: 7 October 1867; 158 years ago
- Closed: 28 July 1930; 95 years ago (to passengers); 5 April 1965; 60 years ago
- Original company: London and North Western Railway
- Pre-grouping: London and North Western Railway
- Post-grouping: London, Midland and Scottish Railway
Location

Kirkburton railway station served the village of Kirkburton, West Yorkshire, England until closure in 1930.

== History ==
The Huddersfield-Kirkburton Branch Line opened on 7 October 1867, serving Deighton, Kirkheaton, Fenay Bridge and Lepton and Kirkburton. It was unusual in that it was built by the London and North Western Railway in an area where the Lancashire and Yorkshire Railway had a virtual monopoly. Plans to extend the line to Barnsley never materialised and so Kirkburton remained at the end of the line. It was primarily used for the transportation of goods, although passenger services ran until the station closed on 28 July 1930. These terminated shortly after the LMS had gained a half share in Huddersfield Corporation bus operations. The line continued to be used to transport goods until 1965, when a combination of road haulage and a decline in industry lead to closure. A 1-mile (1.6 km) stub off the main line at Deighton remained to serve the ICI works until February 1971.

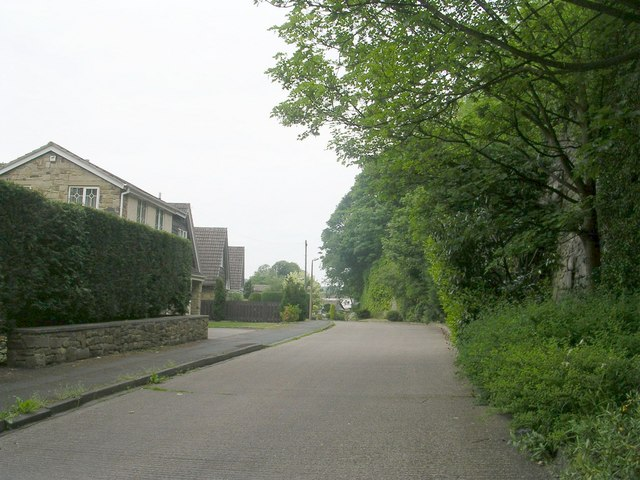
Junction of North Wood Park and North Road, with remains of the former Kirkburton station at the right

The bulk of the station site is now occupied by a housing development along North Wood Park, which follows the old track bed. A retaining wall and arch remain at the junction of North Wood Park and North Road (B6116).

== Route ==
Preceding station	Disused railways	Following station
Fenay Bridge and Lepton	London and North Western Railway; Kirkburton branch	Terminus
