= Kirkburton =

Village and civil parish in West Yorkshire, England

Coordinates: 53.610°N 1.703°W

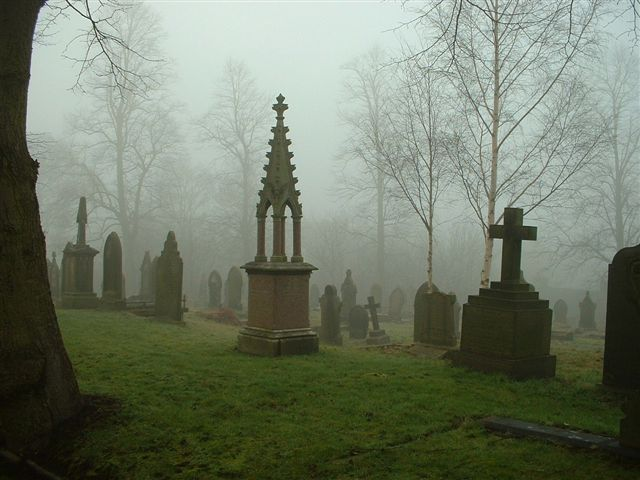
- All Hallows' Churchyard

- Location within West Yorkshire
- Population: 4,299 (2011 census)
- OS grid reference: SE1912
- Civil parish: Kirkburton
- Metropolitan borough: Kirklees
- Metropolitan county: West Yorkshire
- Region: Yorkshire and the Humber
- Country: England
- Sovereign state: United Kingdom
- Post town: HUDDERSFIELD
- Postcode district: HD8
- Dialling code: 01484
- Police: West Yorkshire
- Fire: West Yorkshire
- Ambulance: Yorkshire
- UK Parliament: Ossett and Denby Dale

Kirkburton is a village, civil parish and ward in Kirklees in West Yorkshire, England. It is 5 miles (8 km) south-east of Huddersfield. Historically part of the West Riding of Yorkshire, the township comprised the villages of Kirkburton and Highburton and several hamlets, including Thunder Bridge, Thorncliffe, Storthes Hall and Linfit. According to the 2011 census the civil parish had a population of 26,439, while the village had a population of 4,299.

== History ==
The area was populated in the Iron Age when a settlement was believed to have been built on the site of the church. A Saxon fort is also believed to have stood on that site. The village is recorded in the Domesday Book of 1086 as Bertone in Wachefeld. The entry reads (translated):

"In Wakefield, with 9 Berewicks... are 60 carucates of land 3 bovates and the third part of 1 bovate to the geld. 30 ploughs could plough this land. This manor was in the demesne of King Edward; now, in the king's hand, there are 4 villans, and 3 priests and 2 churches, and 7 sokemen and 16 bordars. Together, they have 7 ploughs. [There is] woodland pasture 6 leagues long and 4 leagues broad. The whole [is] 6 leagues long and 6 leagues broad... To this manor belongs the soke of these lands... Kirkburton, 3 carucates... in all, there are 30 carucates to the geld, which 20 ploughs could plough. Now they are waste"

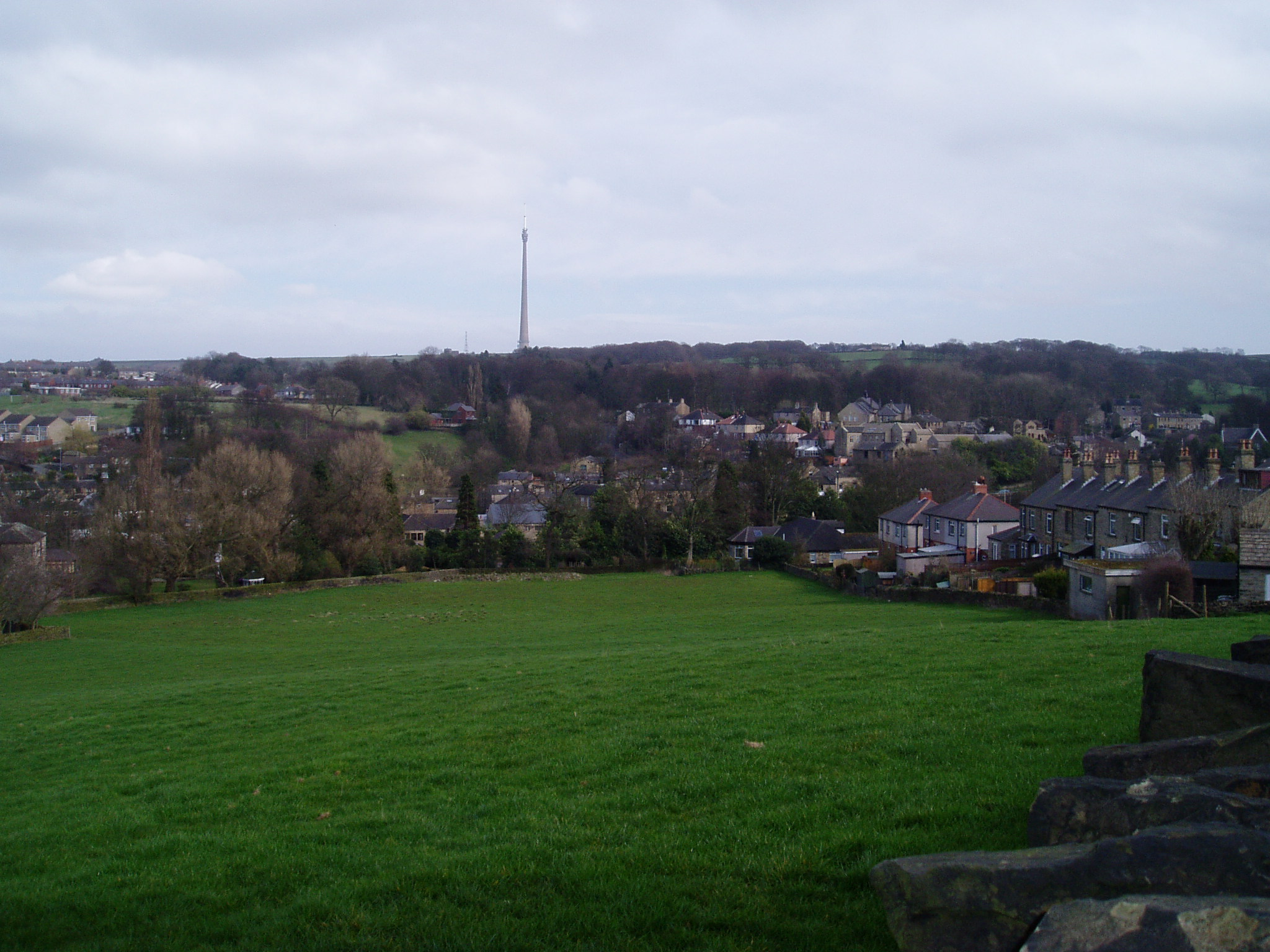
Kirkburton: Looking east from Riley towards Low Town and Turnshaws

After the Norman Conquest the village grew from the waste recorded in 1086. Kirkburton was named after the church was built in 1190 and Highburton was built on the hill. In the Middle Ages the township was part of the Manor of Wakefield and Kirkburton church was at the head of a 16,000-acre (60 km^{2}) parish, that extended to the Holme Valley.

During the First English Civil War the villagers supported the Parliamentary cause. The priest, Gamaliel Whitaker, angered his parishioners by supporting the Royalists. He was denounced to the government forces who went to arrest him in 1644. During the struggle the soldiers shot his wife, Hester, in the ensuing confusion. Legend has it that her ghost haunts the old vicarage.

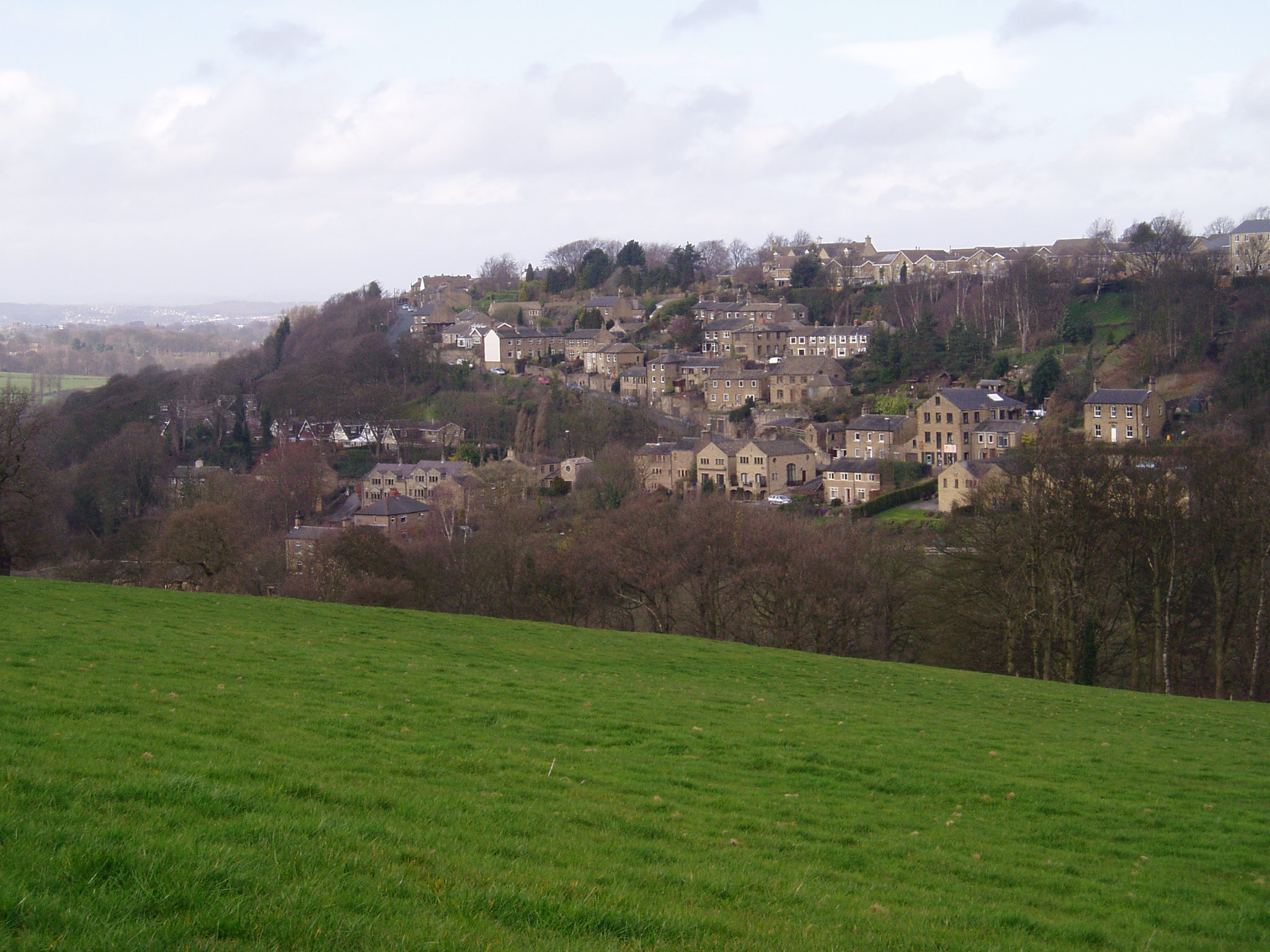
Kirkburton: Looking north from Riley towards Burton Dean and Highburton

The population of the township increased with the growth of the textile trades. By 1800 the population was about 1,400; 60 years later, it was approaching 3,700. After this, there was a general decline and for nearly a century the figure was around 3,000. In 1971 there were 2,800 inhabitants, but following housing developments at Highburton the population is nearer 5,000.

The Huddersfield–Kirkburton Branch Line opened in 1867, serving two terminal railway stations as well as Deighton, Kirkheaton, Fenay Bridge and Lepton. It was unusual in that it was operated by the London and North Western Railway company in an area where the Lancashire and Yorkshire Railway company had a virtual monopoly. Plans to extend the line to Barnsley never materialised and Kirkburton remained at the end of the line which was primarily used for goods traffic, although passenger services ran until 1930. The line continued as a transport goods until the 1960s, when a combination of road haulage and a decline in industry lead to closure of the railway station in 1965. Evidence of the railway remains in the area around Northwood Park, a housing development built on the old route. Parts of the railway station still remain, albeit in ruined state, and the bricked-up tunnel can be seen when travelling into the village centre from the Penistone Road.

A psychiatric hospital operated at Storthes Hall from 1904 to 1991. It was founded as an asylum, the Storthes Hall Mental Hospital (1929–1938), the West Riding Mental Hospital (1939–1948) and Storthes Hall Hospital (1949–1991). After the hospital closed the land was sold to the University of Huddersfield and halls of residence were built. Most of the site is the Storthes Hall Park Student Village, and the remaining area due for further development as a retirement village.

Kirkburton's major industries were the woollen industry and coal. The village has a small shopping centre in Kirkburton but Highburton has become the residential centre.

=== Industry ===
The manufacture of woollen cloth was well established here by the time of Queen Elizabeth I. It expanded rapidly after the late 18th century. The first textile mill was built at Dogley in about 1787 and used waterpower to prepare wool for spinning and for fulling the finished cloth. In about 1800 another mill opened at Linfit, which used steam power. Both mills gradually took on other processes and developed into substantial businesses under the Kenyon and Hey families. By 1880 there were eight mills at work in the township.

Leather tanning and the exploitation of coal seams made valuable contributions to the economy of Kirkburton for several centuries. The last tannery closed in the 1830s. Coal mining grew in importance with the increased use of steam for pumping water and by 1850 there were 20 small pits in the township. The remains of a number of mines and bell pits can be seen, including the former St Helen's Colliery on Moor Lane in Highburton. In the latter half of the 19th century there were more than 30 pits operating around Kirkburton, employing more than 300 men. The last colliery closed about 70 years ago. One old-established industry, which has moved from the village, was the manufacture of edge tools and shovels, which was introduced in the mid-18th century. The last factory, Carter's, moved to new premises a few years ago.

In 2006 Shepley Spring Ltd acquired the former Whitley Willows Textile site in Kirkburton and set up a volume bottled water plant, exploiting the vast high-quality ground water sources in this area. Known as Shepley Spring Brookfield, the site operates 24 hours a day and produces tens of millions of bottles for UK supermarkets and wholesalers.

== Governance ==
Historically in the West Riding of Yorkshire, the township and ecclesiastical parish covered a large area centred on Kirkburton. Kirkburton Urban District was created in 1894 and on 1 April 1938 it was enlarged by the addition of Shelley, Shepley, Whitley Upper and parts of Kirkheaton, Lepton, Thurstonland and Farnley Tyas. The urban district was abolished in 1974 when it became part of Kirklees.

Kirkburton became a civil parish in 1974. Its parish council represents the village and other places within its boundaries including Farnley Tyas, Flockton, Grange Moor, Highburton, Kirkheaton, Lepton, Shelley, Shepley and Thurstonland. In 2011 the civil parish had a population of 26,439.

== Sport ==
Kirkburton AFC play in the 1st Division of the West Riding County Amateur Football League at the Gregory Playing Fields on Hallas Road. Kirkburton Junior Football Club train at the artificial pitches at Kirkburton Middle School. The village is home to Stafflex Arena which was the former training ground for Huddersfield Town and is now the home of Shelley C.F.C., Huddersfield Town Ladies and Collegians FC.

Kirkburton Cricket Club was founded at the Rose and Crown Inn on 25 February 1860. The public house, at the bottom of Slant Gate, is now a private residence. The club played at Turnshaws before moving to Riley in 1878. The club was a founding member of the Huddersfield and District Alliance in 1893. Former England cricketer Phillip DeFreitas played for the club in 1995.

The Gregory Fields Tennis Club, formerly the Fenay Bridge Tennis Club, was built on Burton Acres Lane with lottery assistance in 2000. The club has changing facilities and three floodlit macadam courts.

== Other information ==
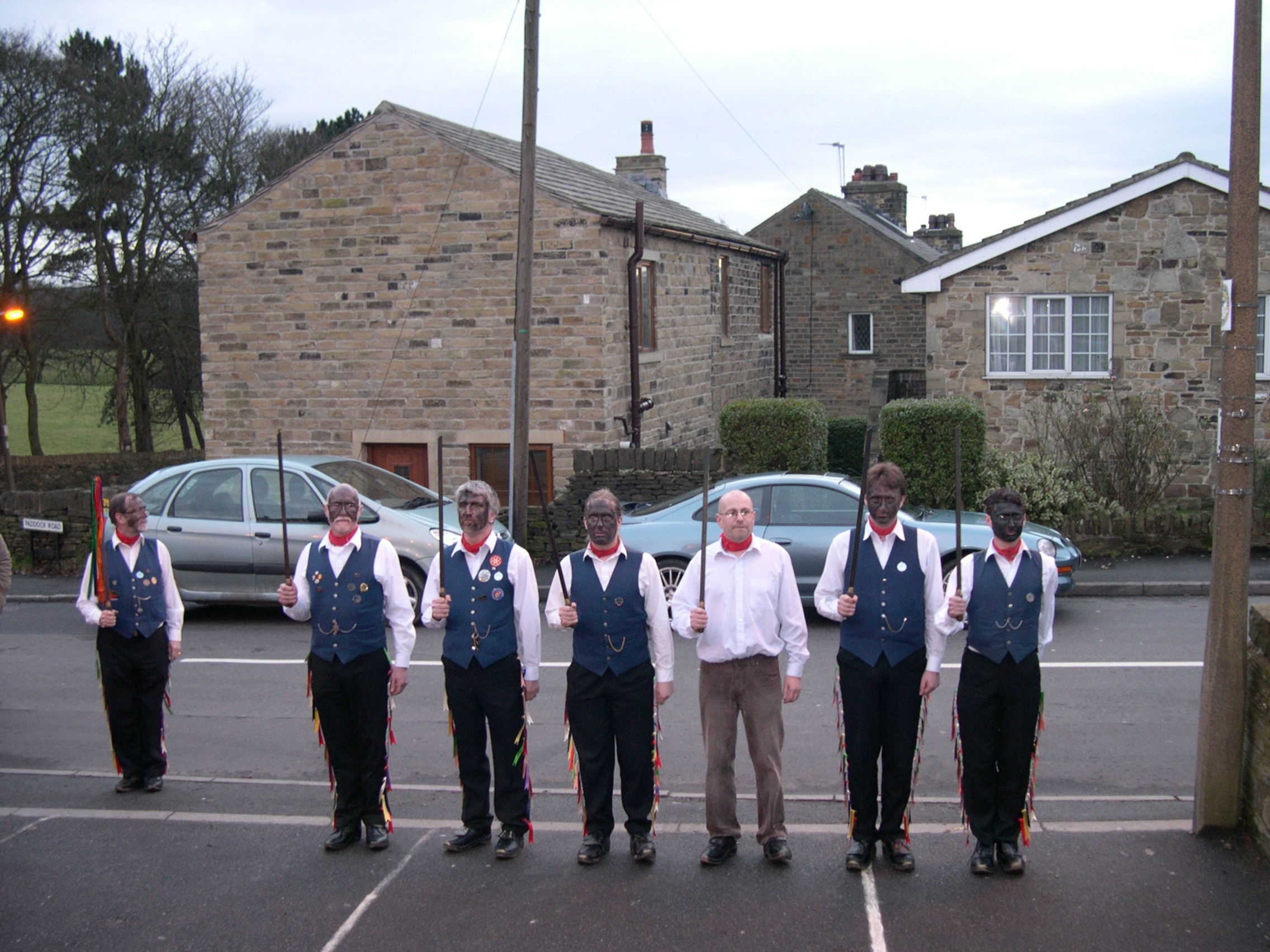
Kirkburton Rapier Dancers outside the Junction public house, Kirkburton, New Year's Day 2006

Kirkburton is the home to Kirkburton First School and Kirkburton Middle School. The Adult Education Centre and Special School on Turnshaw Avenue closed in 2006. The village has a masonic hall, six public houses, a purpose-built health centre (opened October 2005), a dental surgery, and a partially staffed police station. The largest housing areas can be found in the areas occupying Riley, Low Town, Brickfields and Turnshaws. North Road and George Street form the main road through the village and houses the majority of shops and businesses.

Kirkburton and Highburton have a community association that meet at the Burton Village Hall, the former Highburton First School, Northfield Lane, Highburton.

Kirkburton has a rapier dance team, who perform traditional longsword dances each New Year's Day at pubs in the villages of Kirkburton and Highburton in addition to their numerous appearances at festivals elsewhere in the country. Rapier dancing was a tradition in the village up to the beginning of the 20th century, and was revived in 1974. The team adhere to what is largely believed to be the original dress of clogs, blue waistcoats and trousers with ribbons down the side. The final tradition, that of blackened faces, is only adopted during the New Year performances.

Part of Kirkburton's community for a number of years, the Kirkburton Uniformed Group meet at the HQ on Hallas Road. Affiliated with the All Hallows Church in Kirkburton, the Uniformed Group have nearly 100 young members, both Scouts and Guides.

== Religion ==
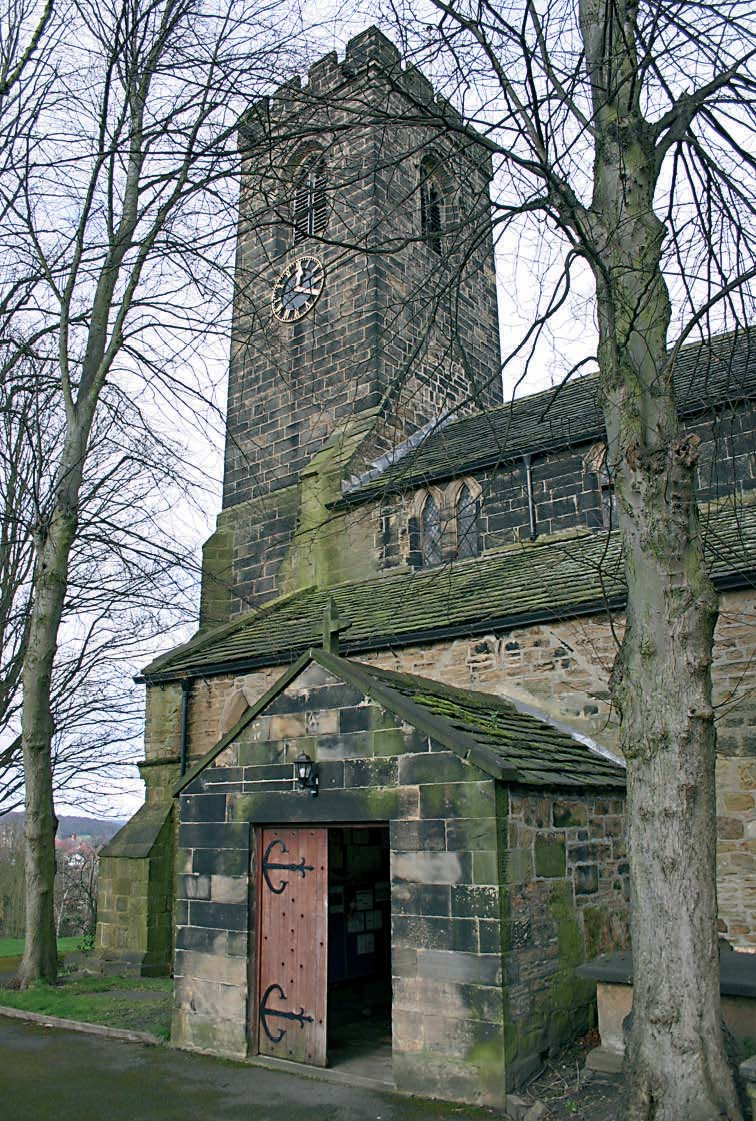
Kirkburton All Hallows' Church

Kirkburton Church is dedicated to All Hallows. It was built in 1190, and is a Grade I listed building. Most of the structure is 13th century although parts have been rebuilt. The tower was added in the 15th century. Inside the church is a late-medieval nave ceiling, large wooden pulpit, stone font and Elizabethan and Jacobean pews. A small window in the chancel may have opened from the cell of a hermit. A restored 10th-century stone crucifix can be found inside, supporting the belief that another church or Christian settlement may have existed on this site. The church has undergone extensive restoration. The churchyard has also undergone landscaping and is a designated wildlife sanctuary.

The Salvation Army Corps was established in the village in 1885. Its present headquarters were opened in 1964. The Salvation Army left the village in 2005 and the premises are owned by the Denby Dale Centre, a registered charity.

The Methodist Chapel was built at Ponty in 1816 but moved to North Road in 1845 on the hill just off the main road that runs behind the old library. The chapel closed in 1987 and is now a private residence.

The Primitive Methodist Chapel was built at the top of Slant Gate, Highburton in 1832. A school, now demolished, was built in 1899 and the chapel was enlarged in 1926. Like the Methodist chapel in Kirkburton it closed, this time in 1973, and is now a private house.

== Places of interest ==
The Masonic Hall is opposite the police station and All Hallows' Church on George Street. It was built in 1889 in a mock-Tudor style as a meeting hall for the local Freemasons. The Beaumont Lodge has met in the building ever since.

The George Inn, the oldest public house in the village, was built in the 18th century. It is on George Street, next to the old blacksmith's overlooked by All Hallows' Church. In 1777 commissioners met there to agree on the creation of the Halifax to Penistone Turnpike, the forerunner of Penistone Road. The Royal Hotel is a Victorian public house built in stone in 1870 was the second largest pub in the village. It has been converted into a Co-operative store.

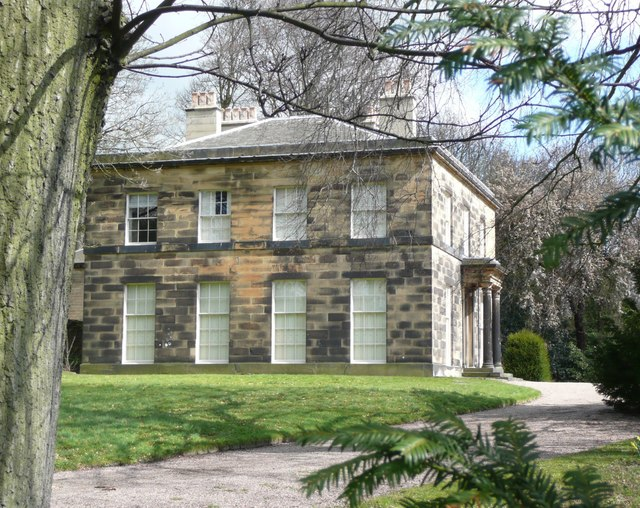
Kirkburton Hall

Springfield Mill dates from about 1820. The owners built Springfield House in the 1830s. It was bought by Kirkburton Urban District Council in 1935 and as re-opened it as the local town hall three years later. The council sold it in 1982. Now known as Kirkburton Hall, it is a Grade II listed building (1978).

The Foxglove public house was built in 1868 in a mock-Tudor style at the same time as the branch line. It was hoped that Kirkburton would become a junction on an extended line to Barnsley, hence its original name, the Railway Junction, but this never materialised. It was known locally as the Three Owls until 2000, when it adopted its new name. An extension was built in 2001 which is now the hotel part of the building.

Manor Mill at Linfit is one of three former corn mills in the township, the others were at Dogley Bar and Smithy Hill. Dating from about 1832, this mill had one of the largest water wheels in the country, with a diameter of 50 feet: it was removed for scrap during the Second World War.

Recent archaeological excavations at Myers Wood have uncovered the most complete iron-working site in the North of England. The Cistercian monastic site was in operation from the 12th to the 14th century, using advanced techniques and water power for smelting and smithing iron.

== See also ==
- Listed buildings in Kirkburton
