= Storthes Hall Hospital =

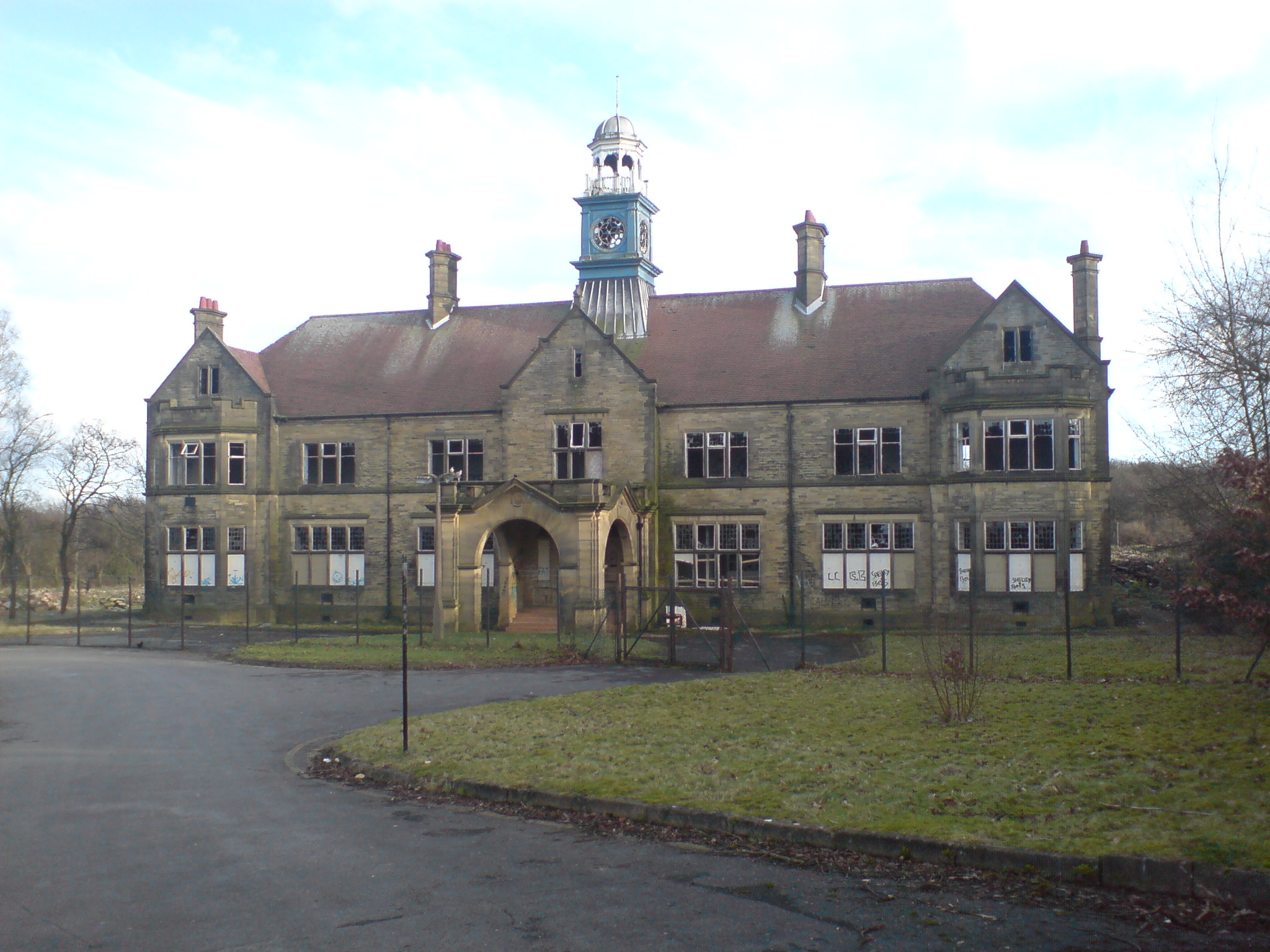
- The administrative block of Storthes Hall Hospital in a state of disrepair

- Shown in West Yorkshire

Geography
- Location: Kirkburton, West Yorkshire, England
- Coordinates: 53.611°N 1.729°W

Organisation
- Care system: NHS
- Type: Specialist

Services
- Emergency department: No
- Speciality: Psychiatric

History
- Founded: 1904
- Closed: 1992

Links
- Lists: Hospitals in England

Storthes Hall Hospital was a mental health facility at Storthes Hall, Huddersfield, West Yorkshire, England. Founded in 1904, it expanded to accommodate over 3,000 patients during the Second World War. After the introduction of Care in the Community in the early 1980s, the hospital went into a period of decline and closed in 1992.

== History ==
An area to the west of Storthes Hall Mansion, closer to Farnley Tyas, was chosen as a site for a psychiatric hospital in the early 20th century. The facility, which was designed by J. Vickers-Edwards using a compact arrow layout, opened as the Fourth West Riding Pauper Lunatic Asylum in 1904. The facility became known as the Storthes Hall Mental Hospital in 1929 and as the West Riding Mental Hospital in 1939.

During the Second World War the patient population swelled to over 3,000 people as the hospital struggled to cope with patients being transferred from hospitals elsewhere as the War Office requisitioned hospitals to treat injured soldiers. The facility joined the National Health Service as Storthes Hall Hospital in 1948.

Storthes Hall Hospital was one of several hospitals investigated in 1967 as a result of the publication of Barbara Robb's book "Sans Everything". Accusations covered a thirty-two-week period of serious violent assaults with fists or weapons against male patients of all ages, committed by four named male nurses. It was also alleged that it was like Belsen because it was a “brutal, bestial, beastly place”—it was a “hell-hole”. However, the same report found none of the allegations against any named or unnamed member of the hospital staff to have been proved. After the introduction of Care in the Community in the early 1980s, the hospital went into a period of decline and closed in 1992. In 2003, Anne Littlewood, a former nurse at the hospital published a book, Storthes Hall Remembered, about her experiences at the hospital.

Much of the area previously occupied by the hospital was developed as a student campus, the Storthes Hall Park Student Village, for the University of Huddersfield in the mid-1990s. A former hospital building, previously known as "The Arboretum" and now known as "The Venue", was extended for use by the students as a social club in 2010.

== Gallery ==
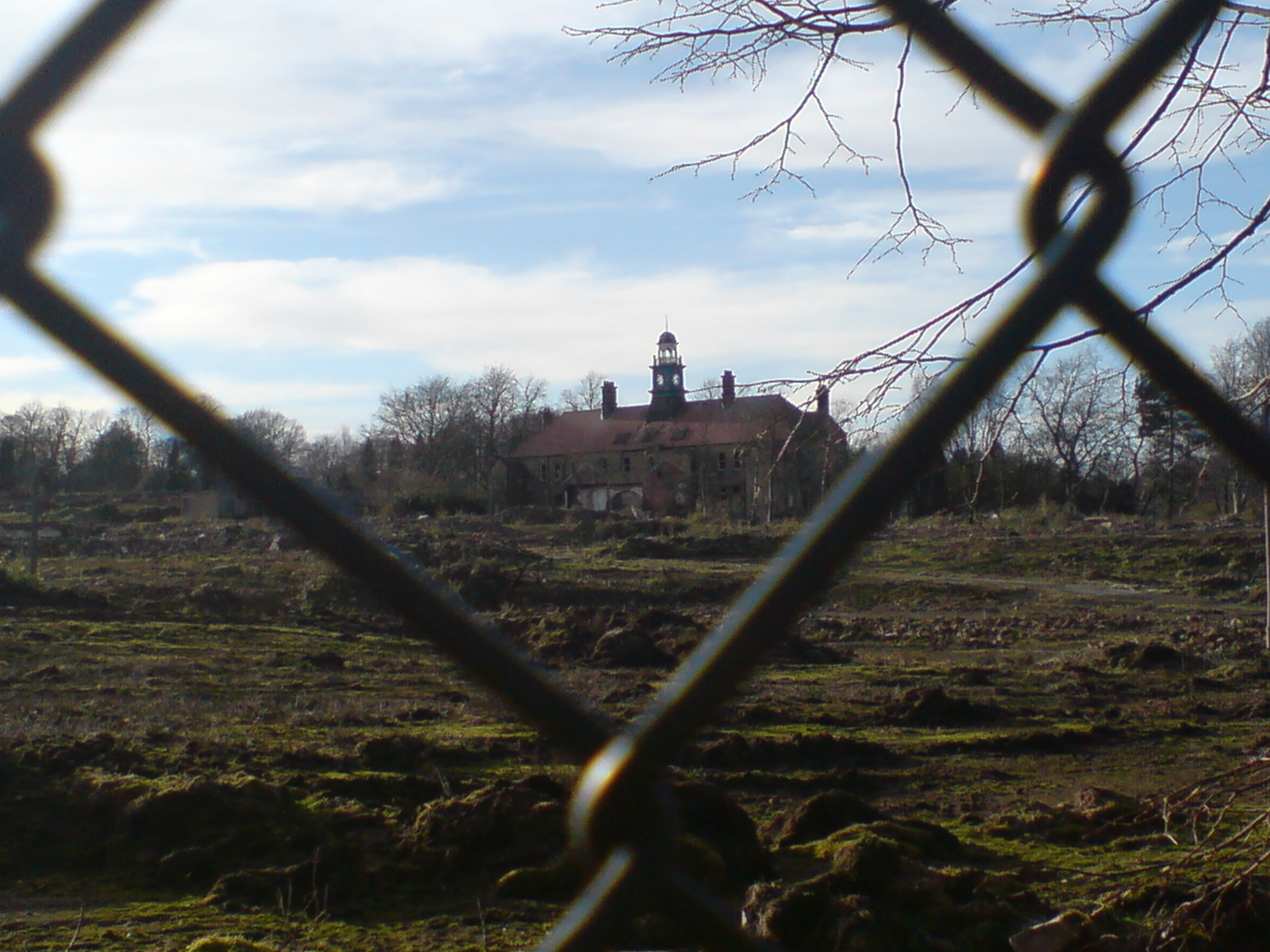
Most of the outbuildings have been demolished but the administrative block of Storthes Hall Hospital survives

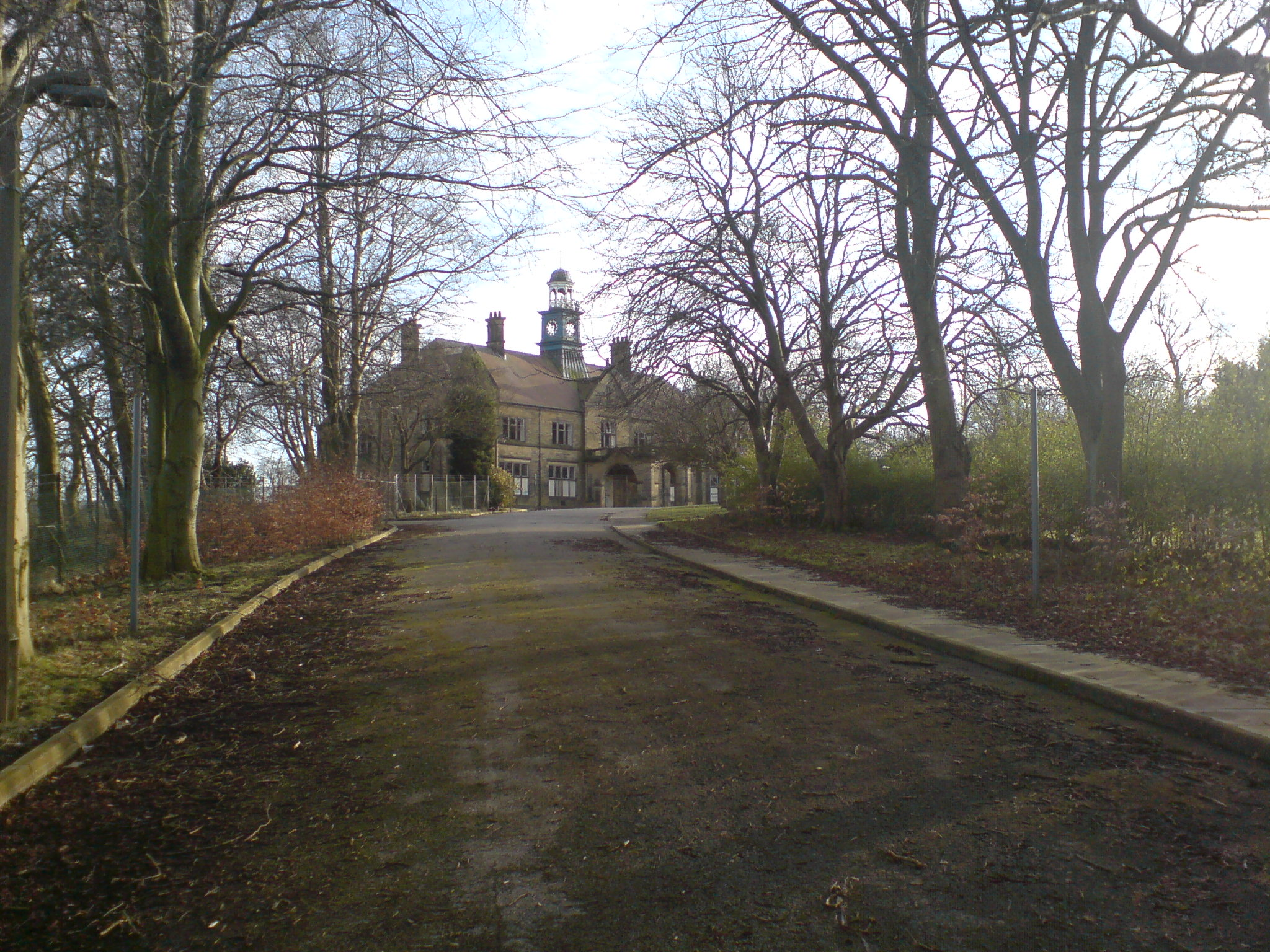
The road leading to the administrative block of Storthes Hall Hospital

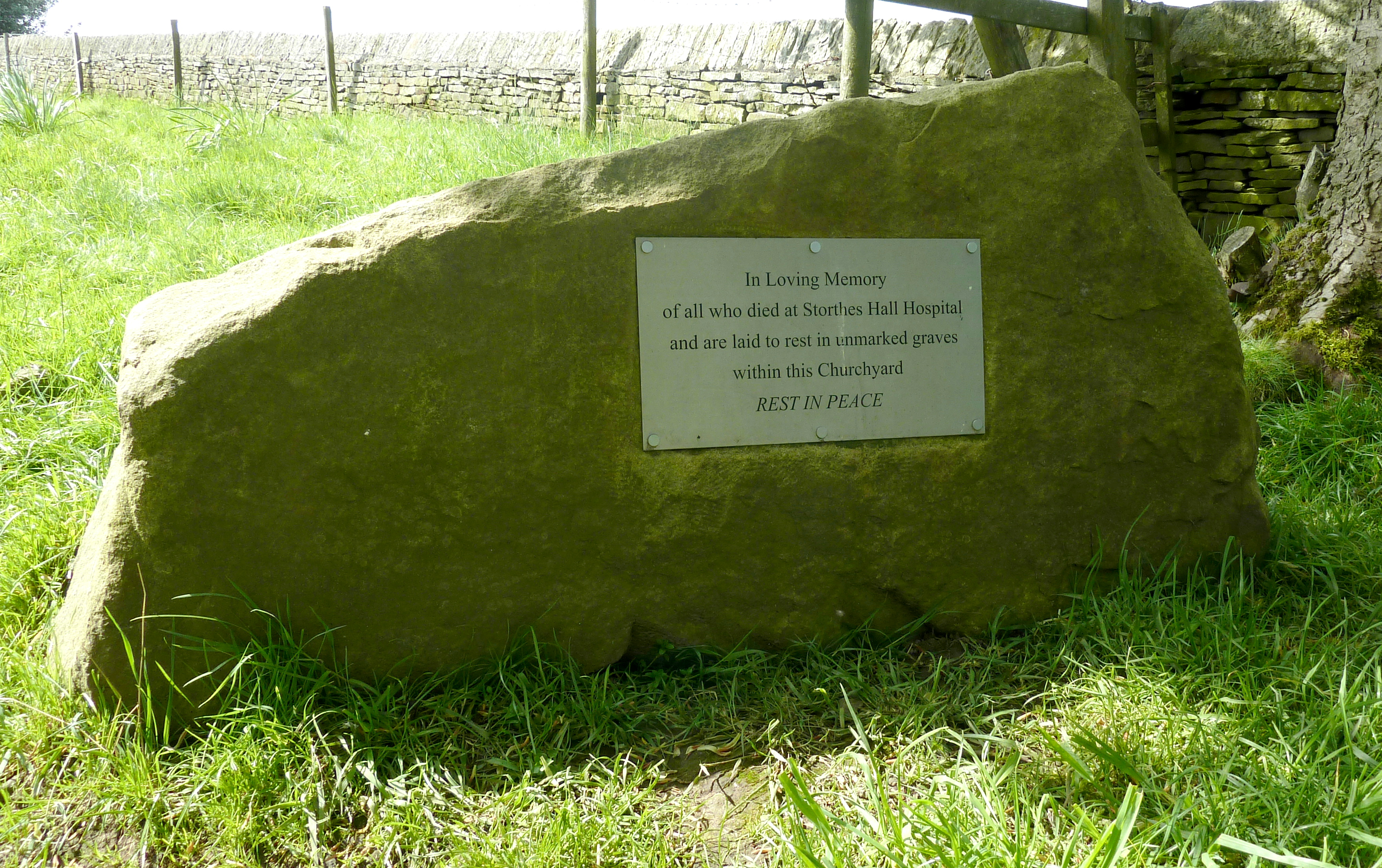
Graveyard memorial at Church of St Thomas, Thurstonland, where around 2,000 patients are buried
