= Thorncliffe, West Yorkshire =

Hamlet in West Yorkshire, England

Coordinates: 53.6156°N 1.6838°W

Thorncliffe
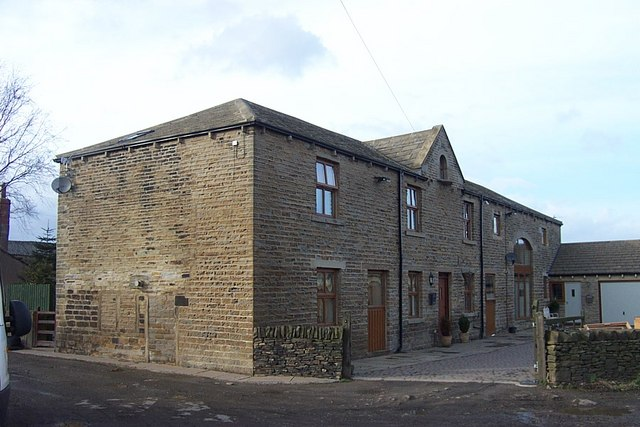
- Converted farm buildings in Thorncliffe

- Location within West Yorkshire
- OS grid reference: SE210133
- Civil parish: Kirkburton
- Metropolitan borough: Kirklees
- Metropolitan county: West Yorkshire
- Region: Yorkshire and the Humber
- Country: England
- Sovereign state: United Kingdom

Thorncliffe (also marked on some maps as Thorncliff) is a hamlet in the civil parish of Kirkburton, in the Kirklees district, in the county of West Yorkshire, England.

== History ==
The name "Thorncliff" means 'Thorny clearing', Thorncliff was also known as "Thornotelegh", "Thornetele", "Thornitelay", Thorniceley", "Thornykeley", "Thorntelay", "Thornecley", "Thornclay", "Thorncliffe" and "Thorneclifte".

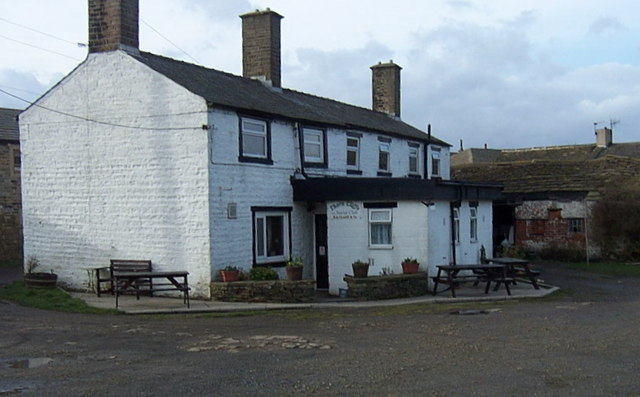
Thorncliffe Social Club

Thorncliffe was historically a farming settlement, today it consists of a farm, a plant hire depot, a few houses and the Thorncliffe Working Mens Club.

== Nearby settlements ==
Nearby settlements include the large town of Huddersfield, the hamlet's post town (five miles to the northwest) and the village of Kirkburton.

== Other features ==
To the east is Thorncliffe Spring wood.

== Sources ==
- AA Huddersfield Street by Street
- A-Z West Yorkshire
