= Highburton =

Coordinates: 53.618060°N 1.713038°W

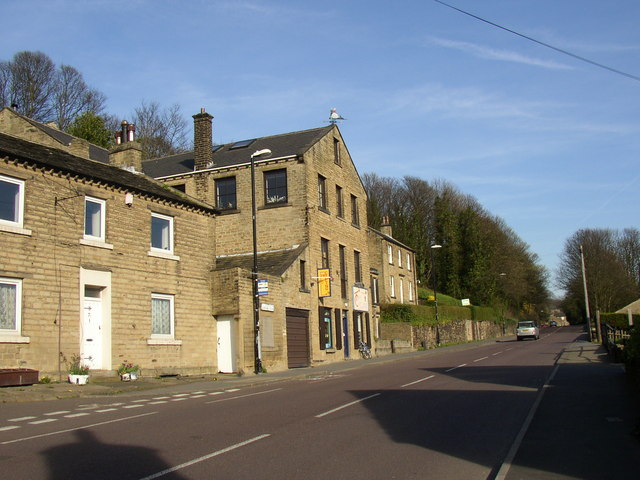
- North Road, Highburton

- Location within West Yorkshire
- Civil parish: Kirkburton
- Metropolitan borough: Kirklees
- Metropolitan county: West Yorkshire
- Region: Yorkshire and the Humber
- Country: England
- Sovereign state: United Kingdom
- Post town: Huddersfield
- Postcode district: HD8
- UK Parliament: Dewsbury

Highburton is part of the township of Kirkburton, a village in the county of West Yorkshire, England. It is five miles southeast of Huddersfield. It occupies much of the high ground that can be found at the top of the steep inclines of Far Dene and Slant Gate and is a mixture of densely congregated housing estates and open pastoral farmland.

According to the 2001 census Highburton had a population of 3,288.

== History ==
Highburton was listed as "Bertone" in the Domesday Book. It has been suggested that Highburton was the location of the original settlement that now makes up Kirkburton, given its strategic high ground. Historians consider that the original church or religious temple was located in this part of the village before it was relocated to its present position. It is more likely, given the possible existence of an Iron Age settlement in Kirkburton that both villages commenced life at similar stages. It was a hamlet until the middle of the 20th century, when housing developments increased the size of the village substantially. The historic old part of the village is around the Cross on Slant Gate, Far Dene and Towngate. Houses towards the eastern part of the village, on the streets that border Moor Lane and Burton Acres Lane, were built much later on what were fields and allotments. Today Highburton is the largest residential area within the township, whilst Kirkburton remains, as it was traditionally, the commercial part.

== Other information ==
Highburton is home to Highburton First School, the school contains six years including a reception year.

Highburton's local magazine is The Burton Bulletin. It contains news and pictures from Kirkburton, Highburton, Storthes Hall and the surrounding areas and is published every quarter. In A5 format, about 40% of the content is in full colour and usually has a total of approx 200 pages. The editorial office is now in Skelmanthorpe and is printed in Peterborough. It is a free publication, delivered by volunteers to 2100 homes every quarter and additional copies are sent on subscription to various parts of the UK, Canada, USA, Ireland and France.

A Royal Navy minesweeper HMS Highburton (M1130) served from 2 June 1954 until she was scrapped in 1978.

== Landmarks ==
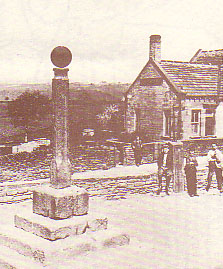
Highburton Cross with the rear of The Smiths Arms in the background

Highburton Cross marks the site of the medieval market, the steps at the base probably date from the 14th century, the shaft and ball from the 18th or 19th. The cross stands at the top of Far Dene at its junction with Town Gate and Hall Lane. Morehouse states that this ancient cross denoted the place of a market, however "whether originated by charter, or by prescription, is unknown". Highburton (Burton) was a market town in the 12th century, and Court Rolls for the Manor of Wakefield for 1352 indicate the rights to impose tolls on Burton market were being let.

Burton Village Hall, formerly Highburton School, was extensively renovated in 1999 with funds raised by the local community and a grant from the National Lottery Fund. It is home to Kirkburton Parish Council and a number of groups.

Highburton Co-op was located on Towngate in the village centre. It laid claim to being the world's oldest operating independent single retail cooperative outlet until its closure in February 2009. The building was purchased from the church in 1856 and began trading in the same year. The co-operative society was wound up in March 2010 and its assets, including the building, were disposed of. After being closed for 22 months, the building re-opened in December 2010 as a village shop with private offices on the first floor.

The Smiths Arms at the summit of Far Dene is Grade II listed and is the only public house in the village and occupies one of its oldest buildings. Built in 1669 in a Tudor/Jacobean style, it began trading as a public house in 1830. Whilst it is the oldest building in the township it is not the oldest public house. That honour goes to the George Inn in Kirkburton, which dates to the 18th century.

The Primitive Methodists built a chapel at a cost of £100 for 100 people in 1832. It is at the top of Slant Gate. A school, now demolished, was built in 1899 and the chapel was enlarged in 1926. Like the Methodist chapel in Kirkburton it closed in 1973, and is a private house.

== See also ==
- Listed buildings in Kirkburton
