= Highburton Co-operative Society =

Former consumer co-operative in Highburton, West Yorkshire, England

Highburton Industrial and Provident Society Limited
- Company type: Consumer Co-operative
- Industry: Retail (Grocery)
- Founded: 22 July 1857
- Defunct: 2009
- Fate: Shop closed; society still exists as of 2009
- Headquarters: Highburton, Huddersfield, UK
- Area served: Highburton, Yorkshire
- Key people: Roger Wilson, General Manager

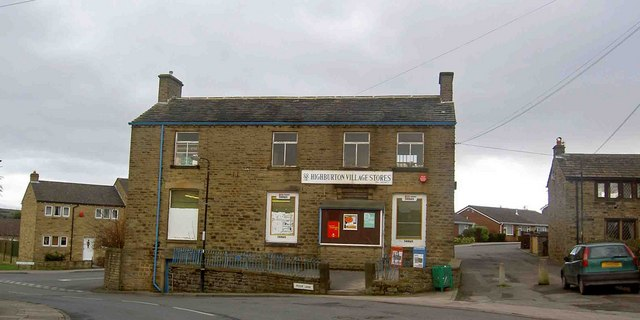
Highburton Co-op, days before closure in February 2009

Highburton Industrial and Provident Society Limited, or Highburton Co-op, was a small consumer co-operative based in the West Yorkshire village of Highburton, five miles southeast of Huddersfield. The Society was founded in 1857, buying the building from the church, and operating a single store on Towngate in the village. The Society claimed to being the world's oldest operating independent single retail co-operative outlet. In 2006, the Society held talks with the nearby Wooldale Co-op with a view to merging the two Societies' operations but these talks ended without a merger going ahead.

Highburton Co-operative closed for business on 27 February 2009.

The Highburton Industrial and Provident Society (Highburton Co-op) voted to go into liquidation on 23 March 2010.

The former Highburton Industrial and Provident Society (Highburton Co-op) building was acquired on 17 May 2010 by Property Compliance Solutions Limited. From 2010, and following building refurbishment, the property was divided into two leased units, the ground floor being a convenience new shop run by Mr Peter Clegg, and the first floor being occupied by PCS Asbestos Consultants Limited.
