= Kirkburton Hall =

Municipal building in Kirkburton, West Yorkshire, England

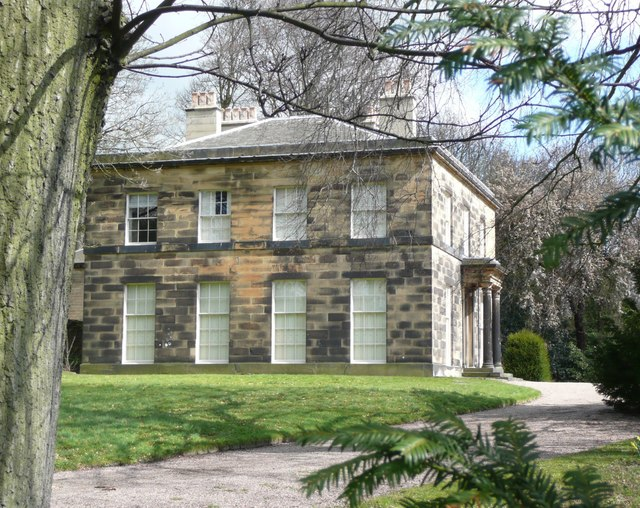
- The building in 2008

- Shown in West Yorkshire
- 53.6143°N 1.7133°W
- Location: Penistone Road, Kirkburton

History
- Built: c.1835

Site notes
- Architectural style: Neo-Georgian style

Listed Building – Grade II
- Official name: Town Hall
- Designated: 29 August 1978
- Reference no.: 1135339

Kirkburton Hall, formerly known as Kirkburton Town Hall, and before that, as Springfield House, is a former municipal building in Penistone Road in Kirkburton, a town in West Yorkshire in England. The building, which was previously the offices and meeting place of the Kirkburton Urban District Council and is now a private residence, is a grade II listed building.

== History ==
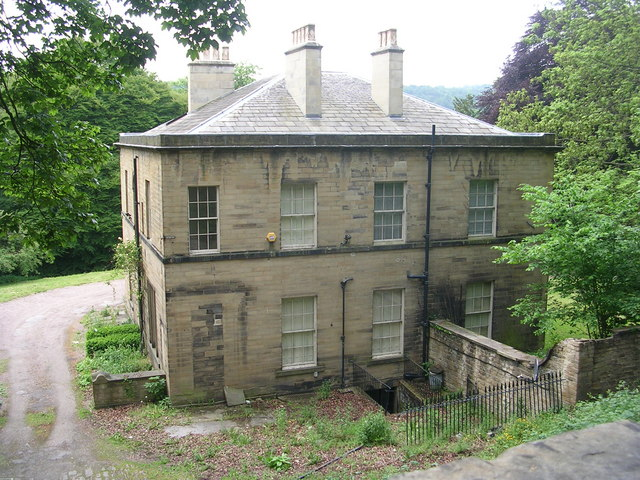
Rear of the building in 2010

The building, originally known as Springfield House, was commissioned by Wright Rhodes, a local woollen mill owner who had erected Springfield Mill on Peniston Road in about 1820. The site that he selected for his house was just to the northwest of the mill but within its grounds.

The house was designed in the Neo-Georgian style, built in ashlar stone and was completed around 1835. Although Rhodes sold the mill to another woollen manufacturer, Hirst Hanson & Sons, in 1876, the house remained in the Rhodes family until at least 1920.

In 1935, the building was purchased by Kirkburton Urban District Council, which converted it for municipal use and re-opened it in 1938. The building, which became known as Kirkburton Town Hall, remained the local seat of government until the enlarged Kirklees Metropolitan Borough Council was formed in 1974.

Kirklees Council sold the building for private use in 1982. Stained glass panels were removed from the building at that time and, in 2008, they were installed at All Hallows' Church. The building was sold as a private house for £2 million in 2019, and was extensively remodelled by Clay Construction to a design by Sheffield architects, 2131, in summer 2020.

== Architecture ==
The two-storey building is built of stone, with a slate roof, and a small lantern which was added at a later date. Its front is three bays wide, and it is four bays deep. The main front has a central door, with a portico, formed by fluted columns with Pentelic capitals, in the style of the Tower of the Winds, supporting a dentiled entablature. The outer bays on the ground floor and all three bays on the first floor are fenestrated with sash windows. Inside, there is an elliptical entrance lobby with a curved stone staircase. Original panelled doors and much plasterwork survives. The building was grade II listed in 1978, and its former stables are also listed at grade II.

== See also ==
- Listed buildings in Kirkburton
