= Fenay Bridge and Lepton railway station =

Disused railway station in West Yorkshire, England

Fenay Bridge and Lepton

General information
- Location: Fenay Bridge, West Riding of Yorkshire; Lepton, West Riding of Yorkshire; England
- Coordinates: 53.6352°N 1.7243°W

Other information
- Status: Disused

History
- Original company: London and North Western Railway
- Pre-grouping: London and North Western Railway
- Post-grouping: London, Midland and Scottish Railway

Key dates
- 7 October 1867: Opened as Fenay Bridge
- 1 September 1897: Name changed to Fenay Bridge and Lepton
- 28 July 1930: Closed to passengers
- 5 April 1965: Closed to goods
Location

Fenay Bridge and Lepton railway station served the villages of Lepton and Fenay Bridge, West Riding of Yorkshire, England, from 1867 to 1965 on the Kirkburton Branch.

== History ==
The station was opened as Fenay Bridge on 7 October 1867 by the London and North Western Railway. Its name was changed to Fenay Bridge and Lepton on 1 September 1897. It closed to passengers on 28 July 1930 but remained open for goods until 5 April 1965. The track was lifted in 1966.

Preceding station	Disused railways	Following station
Kirkheaton; Line and station closed	London and North Western Railway; Kirkburton branch	Kirkburton; Line and station closed
