= Bradley, Huddersfield =

District of Huddersfield, West Yorkshire, England

Coordinates: 53.679°N 1.744°W

Bradley
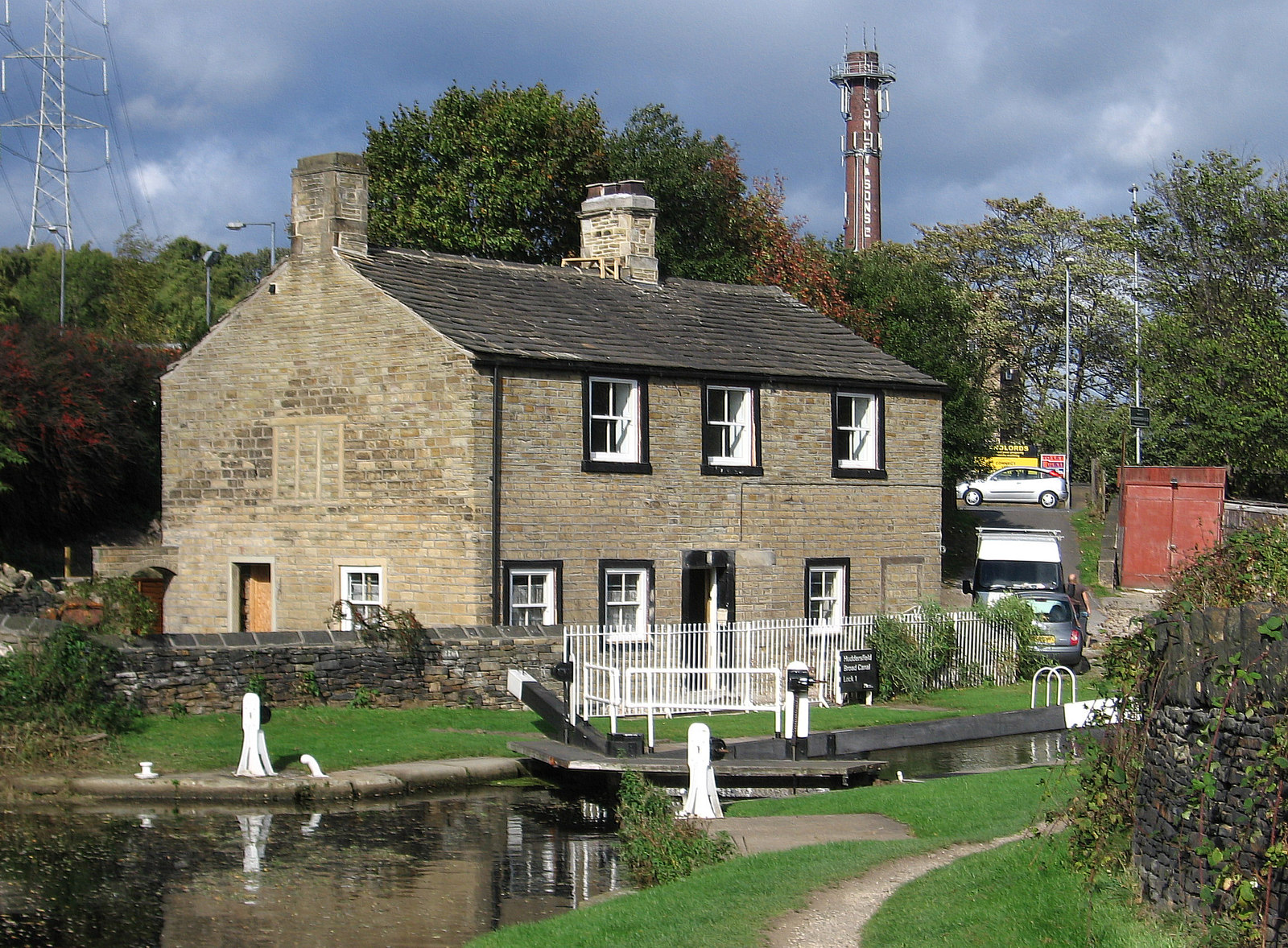
- Bradley - canal cottage at Lock No 1

- Location within West Yorkshire
- Metropolitan borough: Kirklees
- Metropolitan county: West Yorkshire
- Region: Yorkshire and the Humber
- Country: England
- Sovereign state: United Kingdom
- Post town: HUDDERSFIELD
- Postcode district: HD2
- Dialling code: 01484
- Police: West Yorkshire
- Fire: West Yorkshire
- Ambulance: Yorkshire
- UK Parliament: Huddersfield

Bradley is a district of Huddersfield, West Yorkshire, England, 3 miles north-east of the town centre. It is generally just off the A62 Leeds Road and west of the River Colne and the Huddersfield Broad Canal. Located north of Deighton and east of Brackenhall (via Bradley bar), the area has two primary schools, a secondary school and three churches, (one Catholic, one Protestant and another converted to a gymnasium although the burial ground is still in use.

- All Saints' Catholic College, previously All Saints' Catholic High School (which serves the towns of Brighouse and Huddersfield) is situated in the district. Built in 1960 and formerly two schools, (St Gregory's R.C. Grammar and St. Augustine's R.C. Secondary Modern) the two were combined in 1973 to form the currently large high school.
- Bradley has a council estate with the Keldregate thoroughfare running parallel to Leeds Road (A62), as well as two private developments which effectively constitute villages in themselves.
- Has the Campaign for Real Ale (CAMRA) award-winning White Cross Inn public house on Bradley Road.
- Bradley Park is a 17-acre sports and recreation ground adjacent to Wilton Avenue. In December 2017 ownership of Bradley Park transferred from Kirklees Council to Friends of Bradley Park as part of a community asset transfer. Friends of Bradley Park is a registered charity that was set up for the purpose of owning, running and developing Bradley Park for the benefit of the local community.
- In the area there is also the 18-hole Bradley Park municipal golf course.
- Bradley was served by Bradley railway station which was closed in 1952, it was situated on Station Road which joined Leeds Road near the Woodman Inn.
- Bradley Viaduct is a 15-arch railway bridge crossing the Huddersfield Broad Canal and River Colne. It has now been converted for use as a cycleway.

The school TV series How We Used To Live used Bradley as the name for a whole town, clearly located in West Yorkshire.
