= Kirkheaton railway station =

Disused railway station in West Yorkshire, England

Kirkheaton

General information
- Location: Kirkheaton, Kirklees; England
- Coordinates: 53.6516°N 1.7346°W

Other information
- Status: Disused

History
- Original company: London and North Western Railway
- Pre-grouping: London and North Western Railway
- Post-grouping: London, Midland and Scottish Railway

Key dates
- 1 January 1868: opened
- 26 July 1930: closed (passenger)
- 1965: closed
Location

Kirkheaton railway station served the village of Kirkheaton, West Yorkshire, England until closure in 1930. It was located immediately north of the junction of Crossley Lane and School Lane, and was accessed from the latter. The line continued towards Kirkburton on a bridge across School Lane.

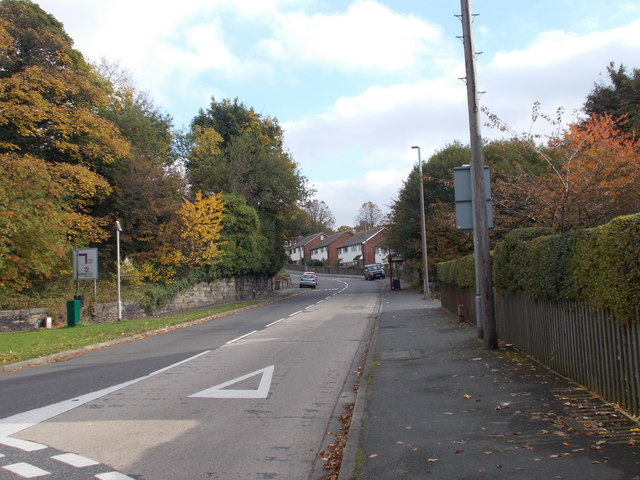
School Lane, Kirkheaton. The station was located behind the trees to the left, the railway crossed the street approximately at the bus stop.

== History ==
The Huddersfield-Kirkburton Branch Line opened in 1867, serving Deighton, Kirkheaton, Fenay Bridge and Lepton and Kirkburton, with the first train to Kirkheaton on 1 January 1868. It was unusual in that it was operated by the London and North Western Railway company in an area where the Lancashire and Yorkshire Railway company had a virtual monopoly. Plans to extend the line to Barnsley never materialised and so Kirkburton remained at the end of the line. It was primarily used for the transportation of goods, although passenger services ran until 1930. The line continued to be used to transport goods until 1965, when a combination of road haulage and a decline in industry lead to closure.

== Route ==
Preceding station	Disused railways	Following station
Deighton	London and North Western Railway; Kirkburton branch	Fenay Bridge and Lepton
