= Deighton, Huddersfield =

Coordinates: 53.668°N 1.756°W

Deighton
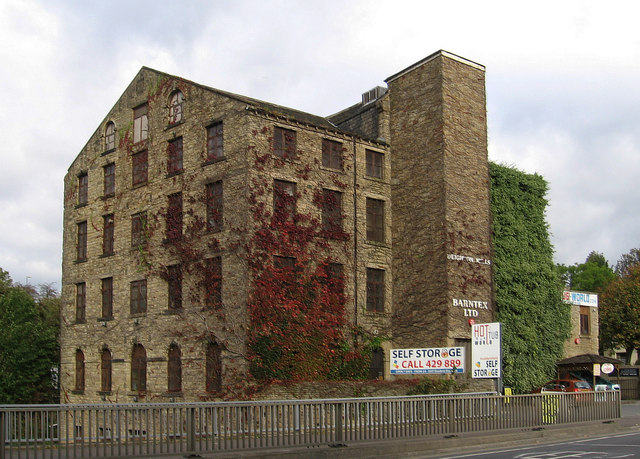
- Deighton - Mills

- Location within West Yorkshire
- Metropolitan borough: Kirklees
- Metropolitan county: West Yorkshire
- Region: Yorkshire and the Humber
- Country: England
- Sovereign state: United Kingdom
- Post town: HUDDERSFIELD
- Postcode district: HD2
- Dialling code: 01484
- Police: West Yorkshire
- Fire: West Yorkshire
- Ambulance: Yorkshire
- UK Parliament: Huddersfield

Deighton, pronounced Dee-ton /ˈdiːtən/, is a district of Huddersfield, West Yorkshire, England. It is 2 miles (3.2 km) north-east of the town centre and lies off the A62 Leeds Road.

Deighton was formerly known as East Bradley and Bradley was called West Bradley. The name changed when the Deighton family bought the area stretching from Screamer Woods (near the Deighton Fields) to Sheepridge and Brackenhall.

Deighton has a railway station on the Huddersfield Line for services to Huddersfield, Leeds and Wakefield. The typical journey time to Huddersfield is 7 minutes, to Wakefield Westgate 31 minutes and to Leeds 34 minutes.

The Deighton Centre was a place for educational, training and leisure activities. It was formerly a high school for Deighton, Bradley and Brackenhall pupils. Deighton High School closed on 31 August 1992 and most pupils and some staff were transferred to Fartown High School. The centre was refurbished as a sports/music venue and used by the local authority, Kirklees Council, for staff training. Next door to the centre the Deighton Sports Arena was developed. It houses a gym, squash court and basketball court and is a venue for dancehall music. In March 2016 the Deighton Centre was demolished.

The chemical company Syngenta has a large plant off the A62 Leeds Road.

Leeds Road Playing Fields has football, cricket and all-weather pitches, a sports hall and an athletics track. It is the home of Kirklees Ladies FC.

== Deighton Carnival ==
Deighton is a multi-racial district and holds Deighton Carnival in late June every year, organised by Fresh Horizons, a community social enterprise group based in Deighton. The carnival started in 2002 and attracts 3,000 people from Deighton and the rest of Huddersfield. It starts with a procession of floats playing Reggae Dancehall, Bassline, RnB, Garage Drum and Bass and Reggae along the road. Costumed bands make up more of the procession, including Suga Brown dance group, "Whitacre TRA" and Bradley Junior and Infant and Ashbrow Junior and Infant schools.
