= Storthes Hall =

Area of Kirkburton, West Yorkshire, England

Coordinates: 53.611°N 1.729°W

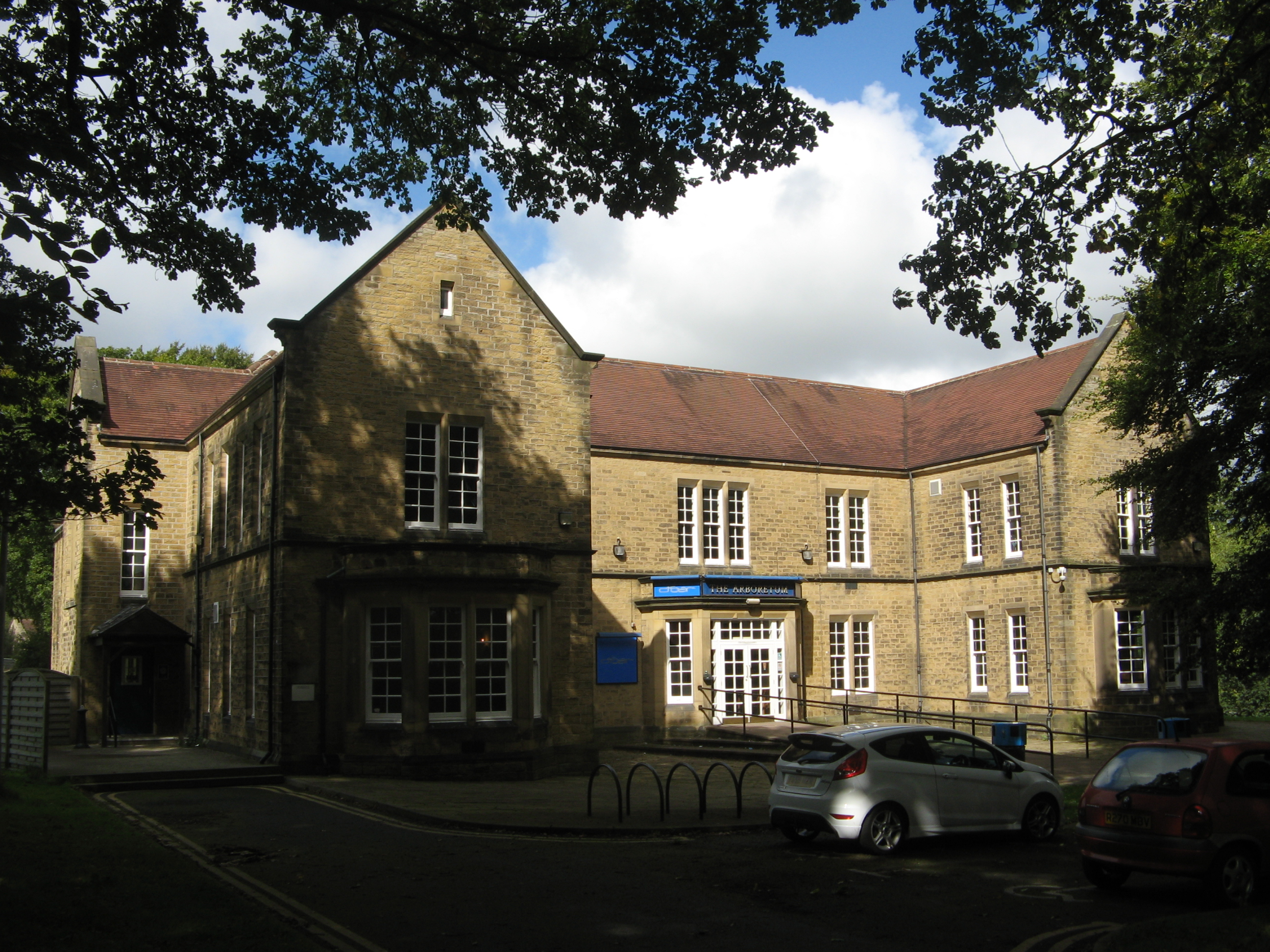
The Arboretum, Storthes Hall Park Student Village

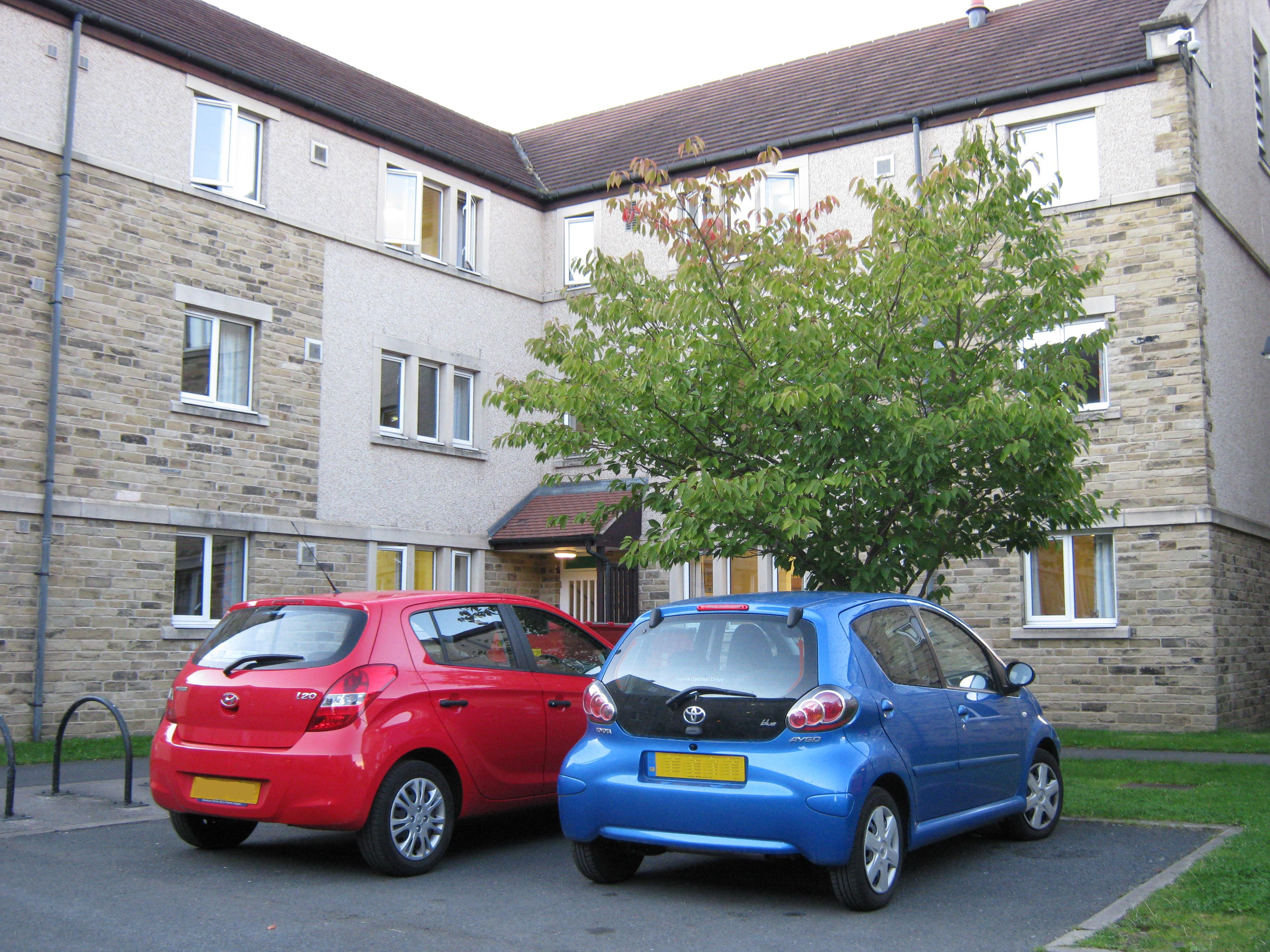
Cinderhill (block C), Storthes Hall Park Student Village

Storthes Hall is part of the civil parish of Kirkburton in West Yorkshire, England. A heavily wooded area, it comprises a single road, Storthes Hall Lane, which links Kirkburton to Farnley Tyas and Thurstonland. The most significant properties are Storthes Hall Mansion (now a private property), Storthes Hall Hospital (located further west with the main administrative block surviving as a derelict building) and Storthes Hall Park Student Village which has been built on the old hospital site.

== History ==
=== The Mansion ===
Storthes Hall Mansion was built for the mill owning Horsfall family in about 1788; it passed to the Bill family after Dorothy, daughter of William Horsfall, married Robert Bill of Farley Hall in Staffordshire. The house was inherited by their son, Charles Horsfall Bill. It is close to Kirkburton and was renamed The Mansion Hospital when it became an independently managed facility for people with learning disabilities. After the Mansion Hospital closed in 1991, the building, which is Grade II listed, was returned to private residential use.

=== Storthes Hall Hospital and sports grounds ===
An area to the west of The Mansion, closer to Farnley Tyas, was developed as Storthes Hall Hospital in the early 20th century. After the hospital closed in 1992, part of its site was used as a training facility for Huddersfield Town A.F.C. before their move to their state of the art Canalside facility off Leeds Road in 2011. The site is now the Stafflex Arena, home of Shelley Football Club.

=== Storthes Hall Park Student Village ===
Much of the area previously occupied by the Storthes Hall Hospital was developed a Storthes Hall Park Student Village, a student campus for the University of Huddersfield in the mid 1990s. The village accommodates the largest single concentration of students from the university with more than 1,300 students staying every year. In June 2024, it was announced that Storthes Hall Student Village would close in July 2024, due to challenges in the student accommodation business and in the wider market. Planning permission was being sought for 261 houses to be built on the site; however this was in the early stages and no approval has been given.
