= Deighton railway station =

Railway station in West Yorkshire, England

Deighton
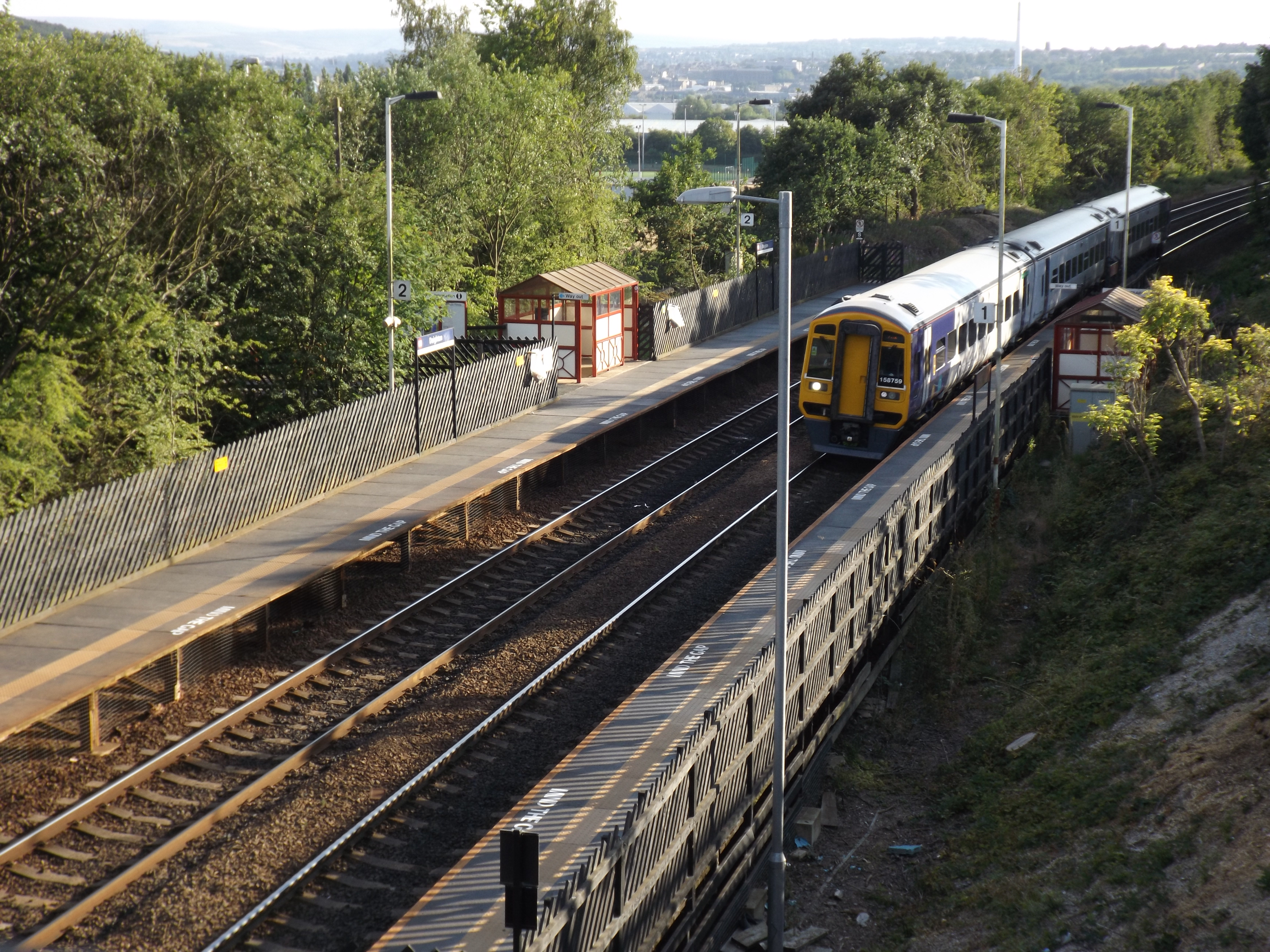
- Deighton in 2018

General information
- Location: Deighton, Kirklees; England
- Coordinates: 53.668340°N 1.752400°W
- Grid reference: SE164191
- Manager: Northern
- Transit authority: West Yorkshire (Metro)
- Platforms: 2

Other information
- Station code: DHN
- Fare zone: 4
- Classification: DfT category F2

History
- Original company: London and North Western Railway (branch station); British Rail (main line station)
- Pre-grouping: London and North Western Railway
- Post-grouping: London, Midland and Scottish Railway

Key dates
- 30 August 1871: Station opened on branch
- 28 July 1930: Station closed
- 26 April 1982: Station opened on main line

Passengers
- 2021/22: ▲51,318
- 2022/23: ▲62,102
- 2023/24: ▼56,648
- 2024/25: ▲63,430
- 2025/26: ▼43,482
Location
Notes
- Passenger statistics from the Office of Rail and Road

Deighton railway station serves the Deighton area of Huddersfield, West Yorkshire, England.

Deighton station is the first station 2 miles (3.2 km) northeast of Huddersfield railway station on the Huddersfield Line towards Leeds.

== History ==
There have been two stations at Deighton, on different routes.

The first station, on the branch line to Kirkburton, opened on 30 August 1871, the branch having opened in 1867. This station was situated on the north-east side of Whitacre Street. It closed on 28 July 1930.

The present station was opened on 26 April 1982 by Metro (the West Yorkshire Passenger Transport Executive). It is to the south-west of Whitacre Street and close to the site of the former Kirkburton branch junction.

== Facilities ==
The station is unstaffed but has a ticket machine. Tickets must be purchased before boarding the train to benefit from any fare discounts. There are waiting shelters on both platforms, but no other permanent buildings. Train running information is offered via automated announcements, digital information screens and timetable posters. Both platforms have step-free access via ramps from the nearby road.

== Services ==
The twice-hourly local service here is provided by TransPennine Express and Northern Trains, eastbound to Dewsbury, Leeds and Hull, westbound to Huddersfield and Manchester Piccadilly. This includes Sundays. Since the start of the winter 2024 timetable there is also now an hourly service to Wakefield Kirkgate run by TPE, with services continuing through to York via Castleford.

Huddersfield to Bradford trains pass through the station but generally are not scheduled to stop.

The station closed for rebuilding in late August 2025, as part of the TransPennine Route Upgrade project. This will see the existing platforms demolished and new, fully accessible ones constructed slightly further to the west. Two additional non-platform lines will also be added, with the section between Huddersfield and Dewsbury widened to four tracks. A replacement bus service will operate during the reconstruction work, which is scheduled to be completed in 2027.

Preceding station	National Rail	Following station
Huddersfield	TransPennine Express; North TransPennine (Manchester - Leeds)	Mirfield
Huddersfield	Northern; Huddersfield line	Mirfield
	Disused railways	
Huddersfield	London and North Western Railway; Kirkburton branch	Kirkheaton
