= Sheepridge, Huddersfield =

Suburb of Huddersfield, West Yorkshire, England

Coordinates: 53.669°N 1.768°W

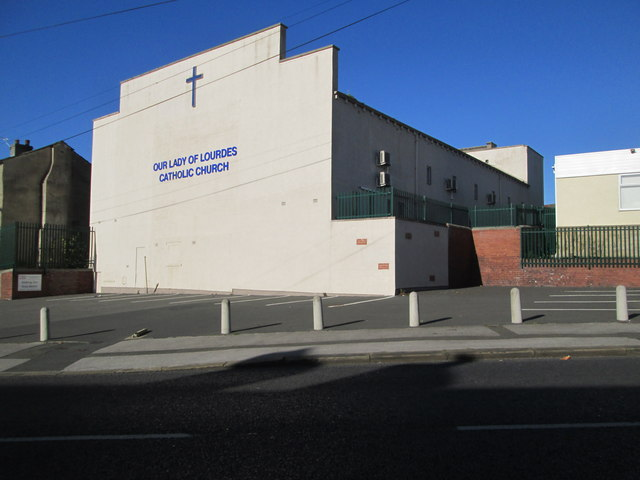
Our Lady of Lourdes Church, Sheepridge

Sheepridge is a district of Huddersfield, West Yorkshire, England. It is 1.5 miles (2.4 km) to the north-east of the town centre.

Sheepridge is situated between Brackenhall, Deighton and Fartown.

A public well was established in the district following the passing of the Huddersfield Act in 1906.
