= Fixby =

Suburb of Huddersfield in West Yorkshire, England

Coordinates: 53.67271°N 1.80004°W

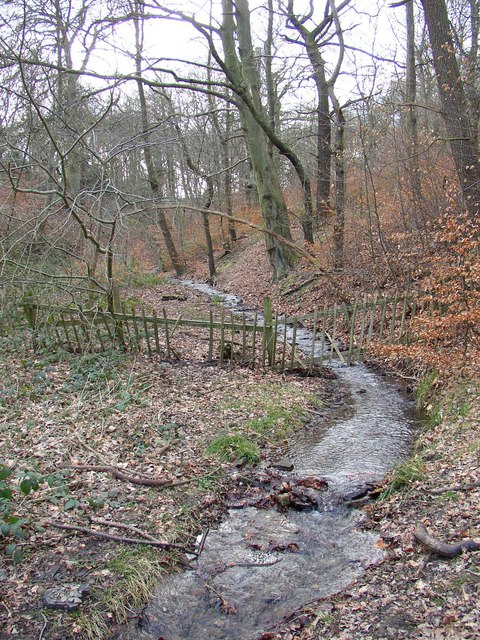
- Allison Dike, Fixby

- Location within West Yorkshire
- OS grid reference: SE132194
  - London: 165 miles (266 km)
- Metropolitan borough: Kirklees
- Metropolitan county: West Yorkshire
- Region: Yorkshire and the Humber
- Country: England
- Sovereign state: United Kingdom
- Post town: HUDDERSFIELD
- Postcode district: HD2
- Police: West Yorkshire
- Fire: West Yorkshire
- Ambulance: Yorkshire

Fixby is a suburb in north-west Kirklees bordering neighbouring Calderdale and is traditionally part of Huddersfield in the county of West Yorkshire, England.

The area is now a sought-after suburban location of Huddersfield for homeowners. The village is just off the A6107 road and south of the M62 motorway.

== History ==
The name "Fixby" derives from the Gaelic Irish personal name Fiach. Fixby is mentioned in the Domesday Book.

In the nineteenth century Fixby was a large estate to which social reformer Richard Oastler was appointed as steward from 1830 until 1838, when he was relieved of his duties because of his political activities: pamphleteering, lobbying and involvement in the establishment of Short Time Committees in industrial towns throughout Yorkshire. The Short Time Committees organised public meetings in order to raise petitions to improve conditions for children in the workplaces of the day, and resulted in the Factories Act 1847, with which Oastler was never fully satisfied.

Fixby was formerly a township in the parish of Halifax, in 1866 Fixby became a separate civil parish, on 1 April 1937 the parish was abolished and merged with Huddersfield, Elland and Brighouse. In 1931 the parish had a population of 582.

== Facilities ==
Much of the historical Fixby Estate is now a golf course, with Fixby Hall as the clubhouse for Huddersfield Golf Club, and intersected by the Kirklees Way footpath. Fixby Hall is a grade II listed building.

The Huddersfield Crematorium is also situated in the area.
