= Brackenhall =

Coordinates: 53.672°N 1.771°W

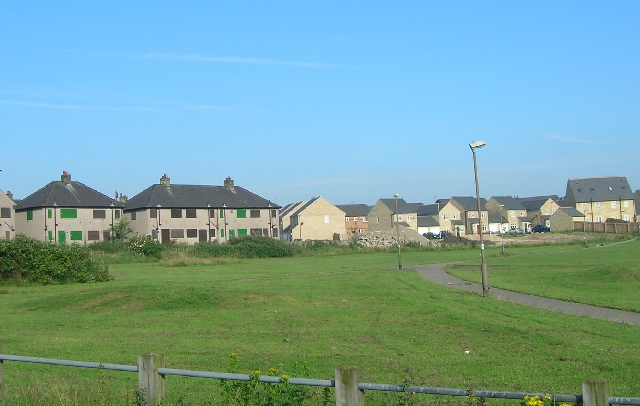
- The Brackenhall estate during redevelopment in 2005

- Location within West Yorkshire
- Population: 2,393
- Metropolitan borough: Kirklees
- Metropolitan county: West Yorkshire
- Region: Yorkshire and the Humber
- Country: England
- Sovereign state: United Kingdom
- Post town: HUDDERSFIELD
- Postcode district: HD2
- Dialling code: 01484
- Police: West Yorkshire
- Fire: West Yorkshire
- Ambulance: Yorkshire
- UK Parliament: Huddersfield

Brackenhall is a district of Huddersfield, West Yorkshire, England located 2 miles (3 km) north of Huddersfield town centre between Fixby and Sheepridge.

== History ==
The estate was created in the 1930s when Huddersfield Town Council moved all residents from the rundown homes in the town centre to new estate. Since the 1960s, the estate was beset with social problems which culminated in a riot in July 1992 when police carried out a drugs raid at the Phoenix pub. The following night, 200 youths clashed with police and there were many injuries. This was one of the worst disturbances which occurred in a wave of rioting across Britain during the summer of 1992, with similar disturbances also taking place in towns including Blackburn and Burnley across the Lancashire border.

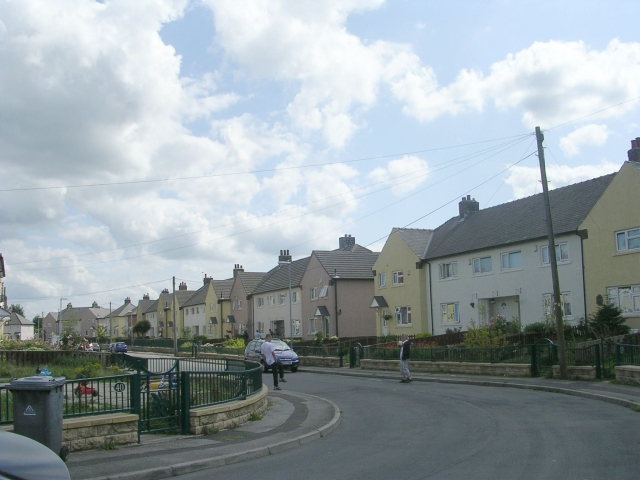
Some of the remaining original housing

In 1997, the council purchased the pub and closed it down, then demolished some of the 1,050 homes on the estate, 20% of which were, at the time, unoccupied. The council entered into a public/private partnership with Southdale Homes. and created new housing which benefited from the location's proximity to the Fixby area, where house prices were relatively buoyant.
