= Listed buildings in Huddersfield (Dalton Ward) =

Dalton is a ward of Huddersfield in the metropolitan borough of Kirklees, West Yorkshire, England. It contains 45 listed buildings that are recorded in the National Heritage List for England. All the listed buildings are designated at Grade II, the lowest of the three grades, which is applied to "buildings of national importance and special interest". The ward is to the east and the northeast of the centre of Huddersfield. The southern part of the ward is mainly residential, the eastern part is mainly industrial, and to the west and north are areas of countryside. The Huddersfield Broad Canal runs along the eastern part, and the listed buildings associated with it are locks, bridges and a warehouse. Most of the listed buildings in the residential parts are houses, cottages, shops and associated structures, and in the countryside they are farmhouses and farm buildings. The other listed buildings include churches and related structures, the remains of a hypocaust and a former cloth hall re-erected in a park, a road bridge, mill buildings and a mill chimney.

== Buildings ==
Name and location	Photograph	Date	Notes
Remains of hypocaust 53.64484°N 1.75487°W	—	79–130	The remains of the hypocaust have been moved from Slack Roman Fort and re-erected in Ravensknowle Park in front of Tolson Museum. They consist of stone columns mounted on a terracotta tiled floor.
Rawthorpe Old Hall; 53.65467°N 1.75494°W	—	16th or 17th century (or earlier)	The hall is in stone with a stone slate roof. It has an H-shaped plan, consisting of a hall range of one storey and an attic, and projecting gabled cross-wings with two storeys. The west wall of the east wing has slate-hanging in the upper floor, and the east wall is in brick and contains a three-light mullioned window. Most of the other windows are modern. One doorway has a chamfered four-centred arch, and another doorway has a chamfered lintel. To the north are stables and outbuildings.
Bankside; 53.65499°N 1.73824°W	—	17th century	A group of stone cottages with stone slate roofs, and an irregular plan. There are two storeys, the windows are mullioned, and one window has a hood mould. To the north is a barn dating from the 18th or 19th century, containing a segmental arch.
Colne Bridge; 53.67751°N 1.73331°W		Early or mid 18th century	The bridge carries Colne Bridge Road (B6118 road) over the River Colne. It is in stone and consists of two segmental arches. The bridge has rusticated voussoirs and keystones, cutwaters, a band, and a coped parapet. The approaches are splayed, and at the ends are cylindrical piers.
6–10 Cold Royd Lane; 53.65399°N 1.73773°W	—	18th century (or earlier)	A row of three houses in stone with a stone slate roof. The oldest is No. 6, the other houses dating from the 18th or 19th century. They have two storeys, and No. 6 also has an attic. Most of the windows are mullioned, one window is blocked, and there is one casement window. To the north is a barn extension.
Nether Hall Barn; 53.65550°N 1.75218°W		18th century (or earlier)	The barn is in stone and has a stone slate roof, half-hipped at the south end. It is aisled, and contains double doors in a porch, and mullioned windows.
Standiforth Farmhouse; 53.64780°N 1.75452°W	—	18th century	The farmhouse is in stone with a stone slate roof. There are two storeys, a lean-to outshut at the rear, and a barn extension at right angles to the north, forming an L-shaped plan. On the house are three ranges of three-light mullioned windows, and the barn contains a blocked segmental-headed arch and various other openings.
Remains of the Cloth Hall; 53.64520°N 1.75478°W		1776	The cloth hall was demolished in 1930 and parts of it reconstructed in Ravensknowle Park. It is mainly in red brick, and has two-bay arcades with pediments at the ends. The original entrance is at the south end, and has rusticated quoins, and a semicircular arch with a triple keystone and imposts. In the tympani are inscribed plaques. The building is flanked by two loggias with Tuscan columns, and surmounted by a clock tower with Tuscan colonnettes, an entablature, a lead dome, a ball finial, and a weathervane.
Canal warehouse 53.64522°N 1.77465°W	—	1774–80	The warehouse by the Huddersfield Broad Canal is in stone with a stone slate roof. There are two storeys and five bays, with a shallow gable over the middle three bays. The windows are mullioned, and in each floor of the central bay is a loading door with adjacent corbels for a crane.
Riddings Lock; 53.66607°N 1.75919°W		1774–80	The lock is no. 6 on the Huddersfield Broad Canal. It is in stone, with iron mooring hooks, and two wooden lock gates. Associated with it is bridge No. 9, which carries a road over the canal. It is in stone and consists of a single depressed arch with a string course and a parapet.
Fieldhouse Lock; 53.66386°N 1.76297°W		1774–80	The lock is no. 7 on the Huddersfield Broad Canal. It is in stone, with iron mooring hooks, and two wooden lock gates. Associated with it is bridge No. 10, which carries a road over the canal. It is in stone and consists of a single depressed arch with a string course and a parapet.
Falls Lock; 53.66298°N 1.76511°W		1774–80	The lock is no. 8 on the Huddersfield Broad Canal. It is in stone, with iron mooring hooks, and two wooden lock gates.
Red Doles Lock; 53.66151°N 1.77038°W		1774–80	The lock is no. 9 on the Huddersfield Broad Canal. It is in stone, with iron mooring hooks, and two wooden lock gates. Associated with it is bridge No. 11, which carries Red Doles Road over the canal. It is in stone and consists of a single depressed arch with a string course and a parapet.
1–7 School Lane; 53.65134°N 1.73395°W		18th or 19th century	A terrace of four stone houses with a stone slate roof. There are two storeys, and each house has two bays. The doorways are to the right, most of the windows are mullioned, and there is a single-light window.
1 and 3 St Andrew's Road; 53.64517°N 1.77364°W	—	18th or early 19th century	The building is in stone with a modillion eaves cornice and a stone slate roof, catslide at the rear. There are three storeys at the front, two at the rear, and a rear wing. Most of the windows are mullioned, there is a staircase window on the west side, and in the rear wing are four bays of industrial windows and partly blocked loading doors.
Dalton Lodge; 53.65058°N 1.74586°W	—	Late 18th or early 19th century	A stone house with a band, a moulded eaves cornice, and a hipped slate roof. There are two storeys and a front of three bays. The central doorway has a semicircular fanlight, flanking columns with fluted capitals, and an open segmental pediment. There are two bay windows, a round-arched staircase window, and the other windows are sashes.
Pandan Aram Farmhouse; 53.67342°N 1.73777°W	—	18th or early 19th century	The farmhouse is in stone with a stone slate roof, it has two storeys, a front of three bays, and contains mullioned windows. The barn attached at right angles contains two circular oculi.
Standiforth Cottage; 53.64790°N 1.75437°W	—	18th or 19th century	A stone house with a stone slate roof and two storeys. The windows are mullioned, with some lights blocked.
Colne Bridge Mill; 53.67809°N 1.73304°W	—	Early 19th century	The mill is in stone, and has stone slate roofs with coped gables. There are two blocks, forming an L-shaped plan. The northeast block has four storeys and fronts of eight and three bays, and the southwest block has three storeys and attics, and sides of seven and three bays. Both blocks have a Venetian window in the ends.
Northeast Building, Bradley Mills; 53.65673°N 1.76483°W		Early or mid 19th century	The mill building is in stone and has a double-pitched slate roof, with a parapet in the valley and an oculus in each gable end. There are five storeys and a front of 14 bays. On the west side is a staircase tower containing paired round-arched windows with keystones and impost blocks. The doorway has a semicircular fanlight and rusticated voussoirs.
John L Brierley's Mill; 53.64747°N 1.77590°W		1846	The mill is in stone and has a slate roof with coped gables. There are seven storeys, eleven bays on the front, and six bays on the sides. In the gable ends are Venetian windows.
105 and 107 Long Lane; 53.64908°N 1.75482°W	—	Mid 19th century	A stone house with a band and a hipped slate roof. There are two storeys, a front of three bays, and a recessed bay on the right. The doorway has pilasters, an oblong fanlight, and a segmental pediment, and the windows are sashes.
111 and 113 Long Lane; 53.64921°N 1.75439°W	—	Mid 19th century	A pair of mirror image houses in stone with a band and a hipped slate roof. There are two storeys, a front of four bays, and a recessed bay on the left. The doorways are in the outer bays, they have oblong fanlights, and the windows are sashes.
1 Silver Street; 53.64345°N 1.77059°W	—	Mid 19th century	A stone house with a band and a slate roof. There are two storeys and four bays, and the windows are sashes.
2 Silver Street; 53.64333°N 1.77033°W	—	Mid 19th century	A shop on a corner site, it is in stone, with a band and a hipped slate roof. There are two storeys, three bays on Silver Street, one on Wakefield Road, and a curved corner between. The doorway has pilasters, an oblong fanlight, and a moulded cornice, and the windows are sashes.
2A Silver Street; 53.64344°N 1.77031°W	—	Mid 19th century	A stone house with a band and a hipped slate roof. There are two storeys and three bays. The doorway has an oblong fanlight, and the windows are sashes.
87 and 89 Wakefield Road; 53.64345°N 1.77059°W	—	Mid 19th century	A pair of shops on a corner site, in stone, with a band and a slate roof, hipped on the corner. There are two storeys, three bays on Wakefield Road, one on Silver Street, and a curved corner between. In the ground floor are modern shop fronts, and the upper floor contains sash windows.
91 Wakefield Road; 53.64332°N 1.77029°W	—	Mid 19th century	A shop in a terrace, it is in stone, with a band and a stone slate roof. There are two storeys and one bay. In each floor is a shop front, in the ground floor it has Tuscan pilasters carrying a fascia, and a doorway with an oblong fanlight. The upper floor contains a round-arched arcade with bulbous capitals.
93 Wakefield Road; 53.64331°N 1.77017°W	—	Mid 19th century	A shop in a terrace, it is in stone, with a band and a stone slate roof. There are two storeys and three bays. The ground floor contains a contemporary shop front, to the left is an elliptical-arched entry, and in the upper floor are sash windows.
95 Wakefield Road; 53.64329°N 1.77006°W	—	Mid 19th century	A shop in a terrace, it is in stone, with a band and a stone slate roof. There are two storeys and two bays. In the ground floor is a modern shop front, and the upper floor contains casement windows.
97 Wakefield Road; 53.64327°N 1.76997°W	—	Mid 19th century	A shop in a terrace, it is in painted stone, with a stone slate roof. There are two storeys and two bays. In the ground floor is a modern shop front, and the upper floor contains casement windows.
111 Wakefield Road; 53.64328°N 1.76980°W	—	Mid 19th century	A pair of shops in stone, with a band and a slate roof. There are two storeys and basements, and a front of four bays. In the left bay is a round-arched entry, the doorway has pilasters, an oblong fanlight, and a moulded cornice, and the windows are sashes. Enclosing the basement area are iron railings with bulbous and spearhead finials.
143–147 Wakefield Road; 53.64306°N 1.76860°W	—	Mid 19th century	A row of two houses and a shop in stone, with a band and a stone slate roof. There are two storeys, and Nos. 143 and 145 have basements. No. 147 has a shop front in the ground floor, and three blind windows above. Nos. 143 and 145 have a band, two bays each, a doorway to the left, sash windows, and cast iron railings enclosing the basement areas.
Jagger Hill, 20 and 22 Jagger Lane; 53.65660°N 1.73685°W	—	19th century (probable)	A pair of stone houses with a stone slate roof. There are two storeys, a lean-to outshut at the rear and a single-storey extension to the east. The windows are casements.
Jagger Hill, 24 and 26 Jagger Lane; 53.65647°N 1.73659°W	—	19th century (probable)	A pair of stone houses with a stone slate roof. There are two storeys and an outshut at the rear. They contain two ranges of three-light mullioned windows.
Barn, Jagger Hill; 53.65671°N 1.73636°W	—	19th century (probable)	The barn is in stone with a stone slate roof. It contains a former arch with segmentally-shaped voussoirs.
Former Gas Board Offices; 53.65262°N 1.77663°W		Mid 19th century	The offices, later used for other purposes, are in stone with rusticated quoins, a sill band, a modillion eaves cornice and blocking course, and a slate roof. There are three storeys and a symmetrical front of five bays. The central doorway has a semicircular fanlight, a moulded surround with two rusticated orders, the outer vermiculated. The ground floor windows are round-arched with moulded voussoirs, keystones and panelled aprons, the windows in the middle floor have segmental heads, moulded surrounds and keystones, the central window with a pulvinated frieze and segmental pediment, and the top floor windows have flat heads and moulded surrounds.
Priestroyd; 53.64678°N 1.76200°W	—	Mid 19th century	A pair of stone houses with a band, a moulded eaves cornice and a hipped stone slate roof. There are two storeys and six bays. The two doorways have Tuscan pilasters, oblong fanlights, and cornices. The windows are sashes, and there is a canted bay window.
The New Church, Dalton; 53.64920°N 1.75465°W		Mid 19th century	The church is in stone, it has a slate roof, and a gable with moulded coping facing the road. In the centre is a porch with four Tuscan pilasters, and a full entablature containing a pediment-shaped die with an inscription. In the porch are double doors flanked by oblong windows with moulded surrounds. Outside the porch are oblong windows, and above it are round-arched windows, all with moulded surrounds.
Gates and gate piers, The New Church; 53.64902°N 1.75454°W	—	Mid 19th century	The gate piers at the entrance to the churchyard are in stone, and are cylindrical with slightly domed caps. Between them are ornamental cast iron gates.
Former St Andrew's Church; 53.65556°N 1.77547°W		1869–70	The church, now redundant, was designed by W. H. Crossland in Decorated style. It is built in sandstone with slate roofs, and consists of a nave with a clerestory, north and south aisles, a north chapel continuous with the aisle, a south porch, a south transept with a west choir vestry, and a chancel with a south vestry and organ chamber. Above the porch is a statue of Jesus in a mandorla surrounded by foliage. In the transept is a rose window, and the east window has five lights.
Dalton Grange, walls and gate piers 53.65793°N 1.75895°W		1870–71	A large house in Baronial Gothic style, it is in millstone grit with a slate roof. The house is mainly in two storeys with an attic and basement. The southwest front has three bays, the central bay being a four-stage tower with an embattled parapet. It contains a doorway with a Gothic arch, triple half-columns with fluted capitals, a fanlight and a hood mould. In the third stage is a datestone and a coat of arms. The right bay consists of a billiards room with a mullioned and transomed window added in 1916. The northwest front has three bays, the outer bays with crowstepped gables and pyramidal finials, each bay containing a bay window. The yard surrounding the house has a millstone grit wall, an embattled wall divides it into two parts, and there are two retaining walls. At the entrance to the drive are two embattled sandstone gate piers.
Spinning block, Turnbridge Mills; 53.64813°N 1.77570°W	—	1871–73	The spinning block is in sandstone with floor bands, and multi-pitched hipped slate roofs. There is a rectangular plan with a stair tower on the west and a smaller tower on the west. The block has six storeys and a basement, eleven bays on the north and south fronts, six bays on the east and four on the west.
Chimney, Turnbridge Mills; 53.64792°N 1.77542°W		1872	The chimney serving a textile mill is in sandstone and has a brick lining. It is octagonal in section and about 30 metres (98 ft) high. The chimney is divided into three sections by string courses, and at the top is a decorative, oversailing cap on paired consoles.
Roebuck Memorial Homes, terrace and walls 53.64503°N 1.74944°W		1932	Four pairs of semi-detached houses linked by open loggias, and with a central pavilion. The buildings are in stone with grey tile hipped roofs, and the houses have two storeys and two bays. In each outer bay is a porch with a hipped roof and a doorway with a pediment, and the inner bays contain a mullioned and transomed window in the ground floor, and a mullioned window in the upper floor. The pavilion has a portico with four engaged columns and a Tuscan entablature with a coat of arms. In front of the houses is a terrace with low walls and steps, and there is a boundary wall with wrought iron gates.
