= Gillian Cookson =

Gillian Cookson FRHS is an English historian of the University of Leeds. She was awarded a PhD in 1994 by the University of York for her thesis titled "The West Yorkshire textile engineering industry, 1780-1850".

== Life ==
Cookson researches in economic history, the 18th and 19th-century industrial history of Northern England, the history of mechanical engineering and textiles, industrial communities and business networks and landscape history. She is president of the Yorkshire Archaeological and Historical Society.

== Selected publications ==
- The Age of Machinery: Engineering the Industrial Revolution (Boydell, 2018)
- Victoria County History of County Durham, V, Sunderland (Boydell and Brewer, 2015)
- Victoria County History of County Durham, IV, Darlington (Boydell and Brewer, 2005)
- The Townscape of Darlington (VCH Studies series: Boydell Press, 2003)
- The Cable: the Wire that Changed the World (Tempus Publishing, 2003; new edition by The History Press, 2012)
- A Victorian Scientist and Engineer: Fleeming Jenkin and the Birth of Electrical Engineering (with C.A. Hempstead: Ashgate, 2000)
- Sunderland: Building a City (VCH Studies series: Phillimore, 2010)
