= Moldgreen =

Coordinates: 53.6442°N 1.7648°W

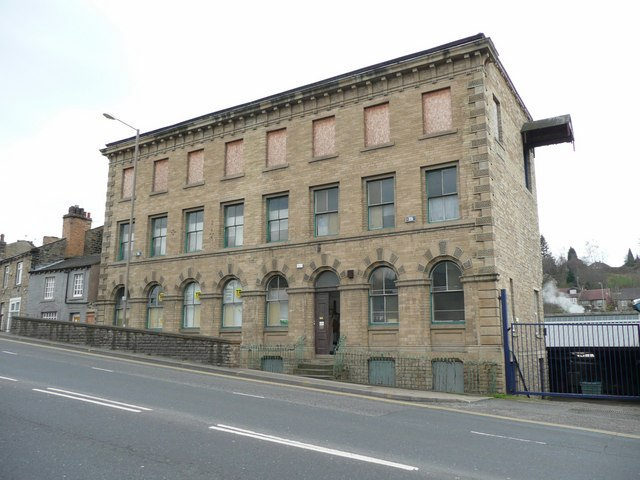
- Warehouse in Wakefield Road

- Location within West Yorkshire
- Metropolitan borough: Kirklees
- Metropolitan county: West Yorkshire
- Region: Yorkshire and the Humber
- Country: England
- Sovereign state: United Kingdom
- Post town: HUDDERSFIELD
- Postcode district: HD5
- Dialling code: 01484
- Police: West Yorkshire
- Fire: West Yorkshire
- Ambulance: Yorkshire
- UK Parliament: Huddersfield

Moldgreen is a district of Huddersfield, West Yorkshire in England, approximately one mile (1.5 km) east of the town centre between Dalton and Aspley.

The main Wakefield Road, the A629, is the main thoroughfare through the district.

The area was originally known as "Mold Green" or "Mould Green" and was a hamlet in the Kirkheaton parish and in the Dalton township.

== Rugby league ==
Moldgreen has a successful amateur rugby league team the Moldgreen ARLFC based on Ridgeway, at the edge of Dalton

== See also ==
- Listed buildings in Almondbury
