= Catherine Tolson =

English nurse and women's suffragist

Catherine Tolson (21 August 1890 – 3 March 1924) was an English nurse and suffragette from Ilkley in West Yorkshire active in the Women's Social and Political Union. She was arrested and imprisoned in 1909 and 1911 when she went on hunger strike and was force-fed for which she received a Hunger Strike Medal from the WSPU. This was sold at auction in 2004.

== Activism ==
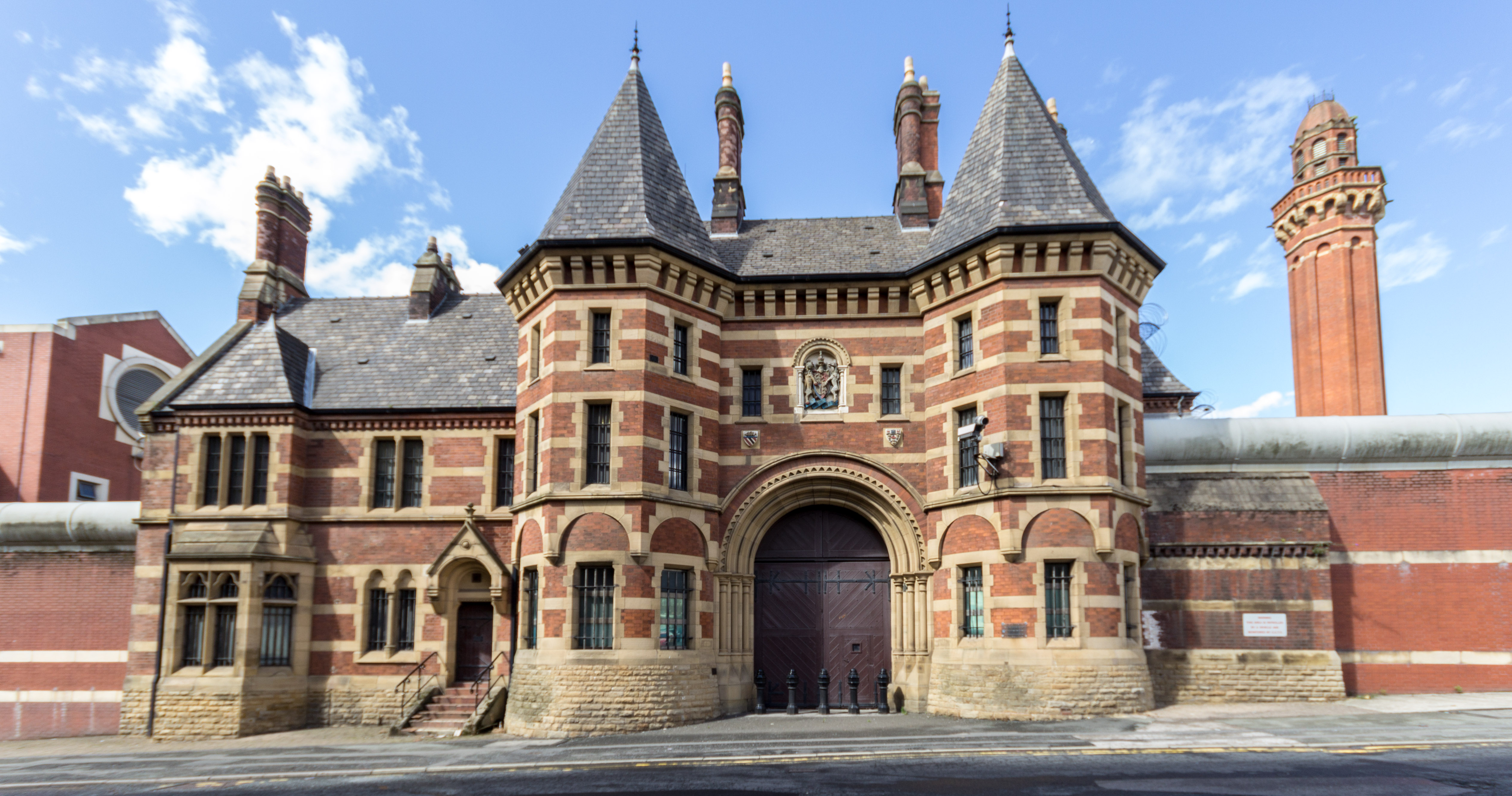
Catherine Tolson was imprisoned in Strangeways Prison in 1909

Catherine "Kitty" Tolson was born in Ilkley in West Yorkshire in 1890, the daughter of Charles Guthrie Tolson (1858–1929), a merchant, and Anna née Dymond (1863–1937). Her older sister Helen Tolson and their mother Mrs Anna Tolson were all suffragettes. After joining the Women's Social and Political Union she became a militant campaigner for women's suffrage. In September 1909 she and her older sister Helen Tolson were amongst the suffragettes arrested for breaking glass at White City in Manchester, who all accepted imprisonment in Strangeways Prison rather than pay fines. Two days later they were released from Strangeways after going on hunger strike for which she received a Hunger Strike Medal from the WSPU. In October 1909 she was again arrested in Manchester and sent to Strangeways. The circumstances of her release on that occasion caused Keir Hardie to ask a question about her in the House of Commons in November 1909. He asked:

"... under what circumstances Catherine Tolson and two other women suffrage prisoners were turned out from Strangeways Prison about 10 o'clock last Friday evening and driven in a cab to the offices of the Women's Social and Political Union in Oxford-road, and left there on the street, the offices being closed; whether one of the women fainted twice before finding accommodation for the night; whether Miss Tolson did not reach home till 3.30 in the morning, having had to walk from Altrincham to Hale through the fog; whether Miss Tolson's father had arranged with the Governor of the prison that he would meet his daughter and the other two ladies at 8.15 on Saturday morning, the day on which their sentences expired, and had given an undertaking that there would be no demonstration; and for what reason and by "whose instructions was this arrangement departed from?"

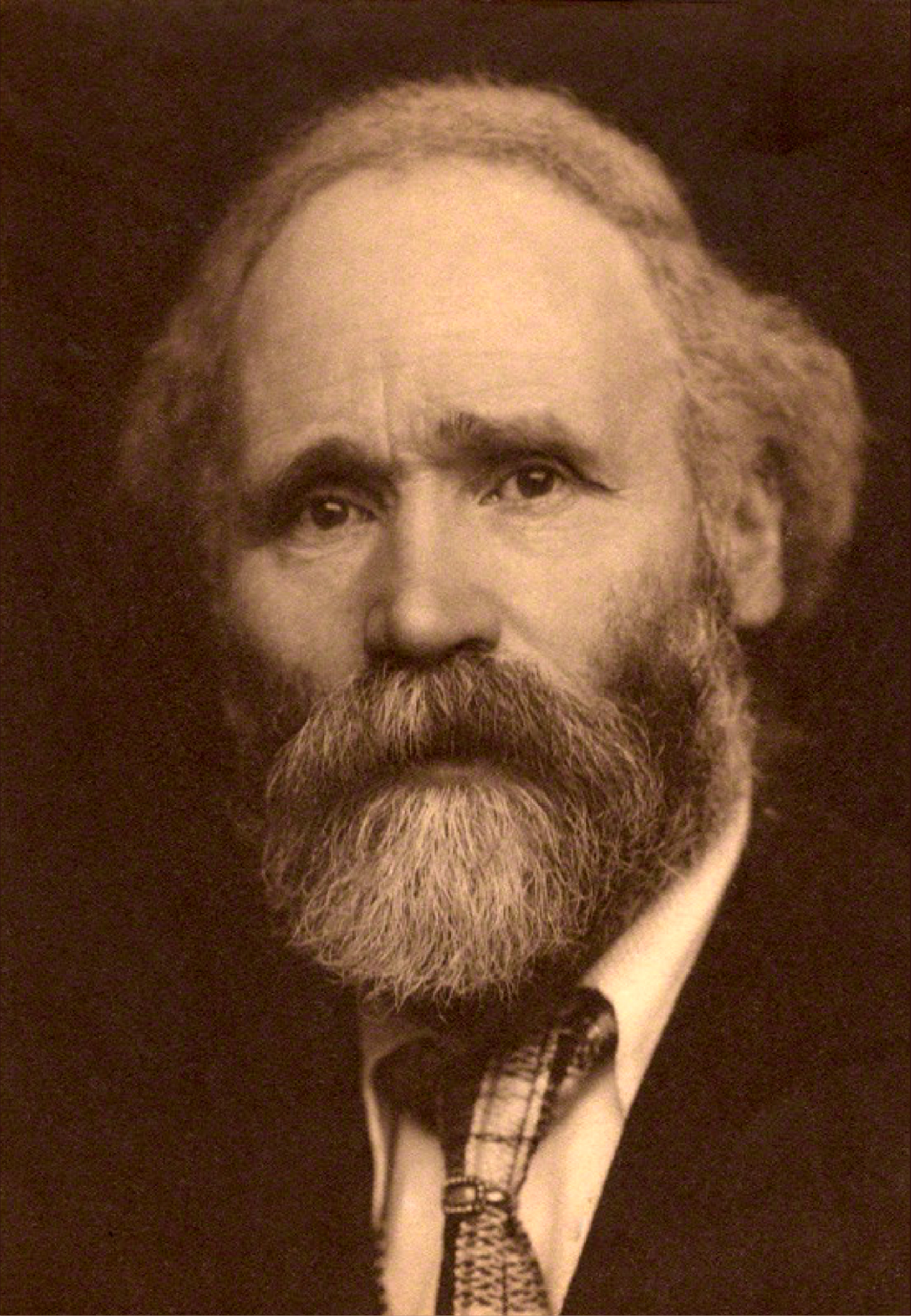
Keir Hardie asked questions about Tolson in the House of Commons in November 1909

In response, Herbert Gladstone, then Secretary of State for the Home Department answered that:

"The Governor, acting on the discretion which had been given to him, decided to discharge these prisoners on Friday night. He arranged the time so as to allow Miss Tolson to catch a train for her home at 10.50; offered to send an officer home to Rochdale with another of the prisoners, while the third was to go to a friend in Manchester for the night. The three prisoners, however, being free to do as they liked on discharge, 'elected to go together in a cab to the offices of the Women's Political and Social Union, and left the prison singing and shouting. It appears that, finding the offices of the union closed, they drove to a friend's house; that Miss Tolson was pressed by one of her friends to remain with her for the night, but that she insisted on going home in a taxicab, and on the driver losing his way in a fog, she walked the last part. It is true that the Governor had arranged with her father to release her at 8.15 a.m. on Saturday, but the father had first voluntarily promised in a letter, which I have seen, to keep this information to himself, in order that there might be no demonstration. The Governor found, in the course of Friday, that information of the hour of release had been communicated to the Women's Social and Political Union; and, to avoid any demonstration, decided to release the prisoners on Friday."

Not satisfied with this answer, Keir Hardie stated that Oxford Road, where the women had been released, was one of the lowest streets in Manchester and that Mr Tolson had made no such arrangement with the prison's Governor. Gladstone refused to be drawn any further on the matter.

In April 1911 Catherine, her sister Helen with their mother Mrs Anna Tolson together with their sister-in-law Mrs M F E Tolson, "all suffragettes who have served time in English jails for the cause" arrived on a sight-seeing visit to New York via the West Indies. Mrs Tolson stated "it was purely a holiday and they would not take part in any suffragette work there".

After the force-feeding of Mary Leigh in 1909 the 19 year-old Tolson joined Emily Davison, the 55 year-old music teacher Helen Liddle and Hannah Shepperd, a mill-worker from Rochdale in a protest against Sir Walter Runciman at Radcliffe near Manchester. As women were banned from the meeting the four protestors held their own meeting on the back of a lorry from which they had to be rescued by the police when a gang of youths tried to push the lorry down a hill. The women proceeded to cause damage by throwing notes attached to stones through the windows of Radcliffe Liberal Club and the local post office. At their subsequent trial Tolson, Liddle and Shepperd were sentenced to a month in prison with hard labour while Davison, because of her previous convictions, received two months with hard labour. The four women immediately commenced a hunger strike and were force-fed during their sentence. Davison barricaded the door of her cell with two beds and mattresses and was blasted with a firehose for 15 minutes through her cell window.

In 1919 Tolson's father's cousin Legh Tolson gave Ravensknowle Hall to Huddersfield Corporation to use as a museum in memory of her second cousins, brothers 2nd Lieutenant Robert Huntriss Tolson, killed on 1 July 1916 at the Battle of the Somme, and 2nd Lieutenant James Martin Tolson who died in the closing stages of World War I on 2 October 1918. Tolson Museum was formally opened on 27 May 1922.

Catherine Tolson died of tuberculosis aged 34. She never married.

In 1909 Tolson was given a Hunger Strike Medal 'for Valour' by the WSPU which was sold at auction in 2004.
