= Helen Tolson =

English suffrage (1888–1955)

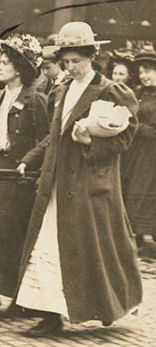
- Tolson campaigning in Manchester Docks in December 1908
- Born: 1888; Wilmslow, England, United Kingdom of Great Britain and Ireland
- Died: 1955 (aged 66–67)
- Known for: Activism for women's suffrage
- Relatives: Catherine Tolson (sister)

Helen Tolson (1888–1955) was an English suffragette from Wilmslow in Cheshire active in the Women's Social and Political Union (WPSU). She was repeatedly arrested in 1908 and 1909.

== Activism ==
Helen Tolson was born in Wilmslow in Cheshire in 1888, the daughter of Charles Guthrie Tolson (1858–1929), a merchant, and Anna née Dymond (1863–1937). Her younger sister Catherine Tolson and their mother Mrs Anna Tolson were all suffragettes.

In December 1908 Tolson, aged 20, was arrested with Patricia Tomlison and Joseph Salignet outside the Sun Hall in Liverpool, where David Lloyd George was speaking. The magistrate dismissed the case to avoid giving publicity to their "stupid behaviour". In March 1909 Tolson was amongst the Manchester women who joined the delegation of suffragettes who made an attempt to speak to the Prime Minister about the need for women to be allowed the vote. When Tolson was arrested outside the Houses of Parliament, her father wrote to the Home Secretary, Herbert Gladstone, to complain at the police violence. In August, Tolson was beaten up by a Liberal crowd who had come to hear Winston Churchill and Herbert Samuel at Rushpool Hall, Saltburn-by-the-Sea.

In September she and her younger sister Catherine were amongst the suffragettes arrested for breaking glass at White City in Manchester, who all accepted imprisonment rather than pay fines. Two days later they were released from Strangeways after going on hunger strike. On 4 December 1909 Tolson, Dora Marsden and Winson Etherley were arrested for breach of the peace for disrupting an appearance by Winston Churchill at the Empire Theatre in Southport. Charges were dismissed at their court appearance later that week.

In April 1911 Helen, her sister Catherine with their mother Mrs Anna Tolson together with their sister-in-law Mrs M F E Tolson, "all suffragettes who have served time in English jails for the cause" arrived on a sight-seeing visit to New York via the West Indies. Mrs Tolson stated "it was purely a holiday and they would not take part in any suffragette work there".

In 1919 Helen Tolson married John Paxton at Marylebone Register Office. Also in 1919 her uncle Legh Tolson gave Ravensknowle Hall to Huddersfield Corporation to use as a museum in memory of her brothers 2nd Lieutenant Robert Huntriss Tolson, killed on 1 July 1916 at the Battle of the Somme, and 2nd Lieutenant James Martin Tolson who died in the closing stages of World War I on 2 October 1918. Tolson Museum was formally opened on 27 May 1922.

Helen Tolson was awarded a Hunger Strike Medal 'For Valour' by the WSPU.
