= George Lloyd (archaeologist) =

English Anglican curate and archaeologist

- Reverend
- Church: 1861 Thurstonland Dissenters' chapel 1860s Trimdon St Paul; 1860s Church Gresley St George & St Mary; 1871 Cramlington St Nicholas

Orders
- Ordination: 1861 or 1862 (deacon)

Personal details
- Born: 1820 Coleshill, Warwickshire, England
- Died: 21 January 1885 (aged 64–65) Longbenton, England
- Buried: Cramlington, England
- Spouse: Sarah Sharkey Lloyd
- Children: George William Lloyd (b. 1860)

George Lloyd (1820 – 21 January 1885) was an English Anglican curate and archaeologist. He was the leading founding member of the Huddersfield Archaeological and Topographical Association, which became the Yorkshire Archaeological Society, and is now the Yorkshire Archaeological and Historical Society. The society was founded in 1863 for the purpose of funding and organising excavations at Slack Roman fort. The excavations were initially supervised and documented by Lloyd. In the 1860s and 1870s he was curate of Thurstonland in West Yorkshire, Trimdon in County Durham, Church Gresley in South Derbyshire and Cramlington in Northumberland. He was an outspoken man who once received an assassination threat, and this character trait may possibly explain why he was never ordained as a priest.

== Personal life ==
George Lloyd was born in Coleshill, Warwickshire, in 1820. His whereabouts during his first forty years are unknown, but he may have spent some time in Ireland, since he edited a magazine in Belfast and married an Irish woman. His wife Sarah Sharkey Lloyd was born in Blackrock, Dublin in 1816 or 1822. She died in Blyth, Northumberland on 21 November 1885, aged 69 years. They had a son, George William Lloyd, who was born in London, Middlesex 1860. George William may have died in 1894 in Camberwell. By the beginning of 1885 Lloyd and his wife were living at Trimdon. He died on 20 January 1885 at Longbenton, aged 65 years and was buried at Cramlington.

== Huddersfield Archaeological and Topographical Association ==
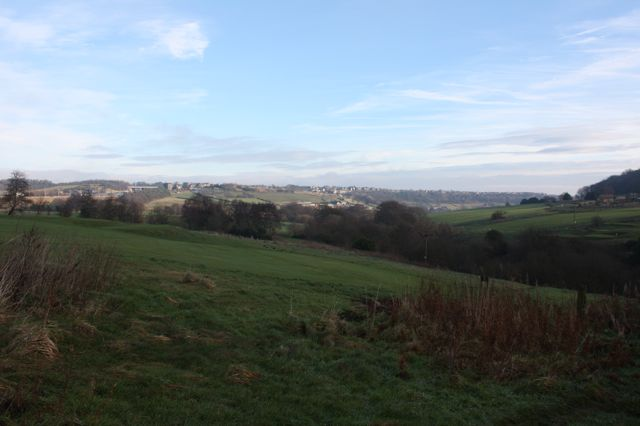
Part of the Slack Roman fort site, excavated by Lloyd in 1865–1866

In 1863 Lloyd took a leading part in founding Huddersfield Archaeological and Topographical Association. His efforts were supported by the Earl of Dartmouth who later funded the building of the Church of St Thomas, Thurstonland, and by Sir J.W. Ramsden. The association was founded to organise renewed excavations in response to the large number of ancient relics found in the neighbourhood of Slack Roman fort. The site, then known as Cambodunum, was first discovered in 1824. By May 1865 Lloyd was honorary secretary of the society, and was appealing in the press for excavation funds. On Saturday 3 June the society held its first formal meeting in which Lloyd was able to report some funding for excavation, and in which papers were read, describing in detail findings at the Slack site. By November of that year he was supervising excavations at Slack Roman fort. A Roman villa, a bath house with hypocaust, walls 3 feet (0.91 m) thick, a red tiled floor, pillars, silver coins of Vespasian and Nerva, and a gold ring were found. The original notes from the 1865–1866 excavation are lost. When he left the association, the Halifax Guardian said, "It would be difficult to find his equal as a disinterested, unprejudiced supervisor in these interesting excavations" which had been "already so signally successful." He resigned his membership on 10 September 1866 to take up a curacy in County Durham.

== Curacies ==
George Lloyd was ordained deacon in 1861 or 1862.

=== Thurstonland ===
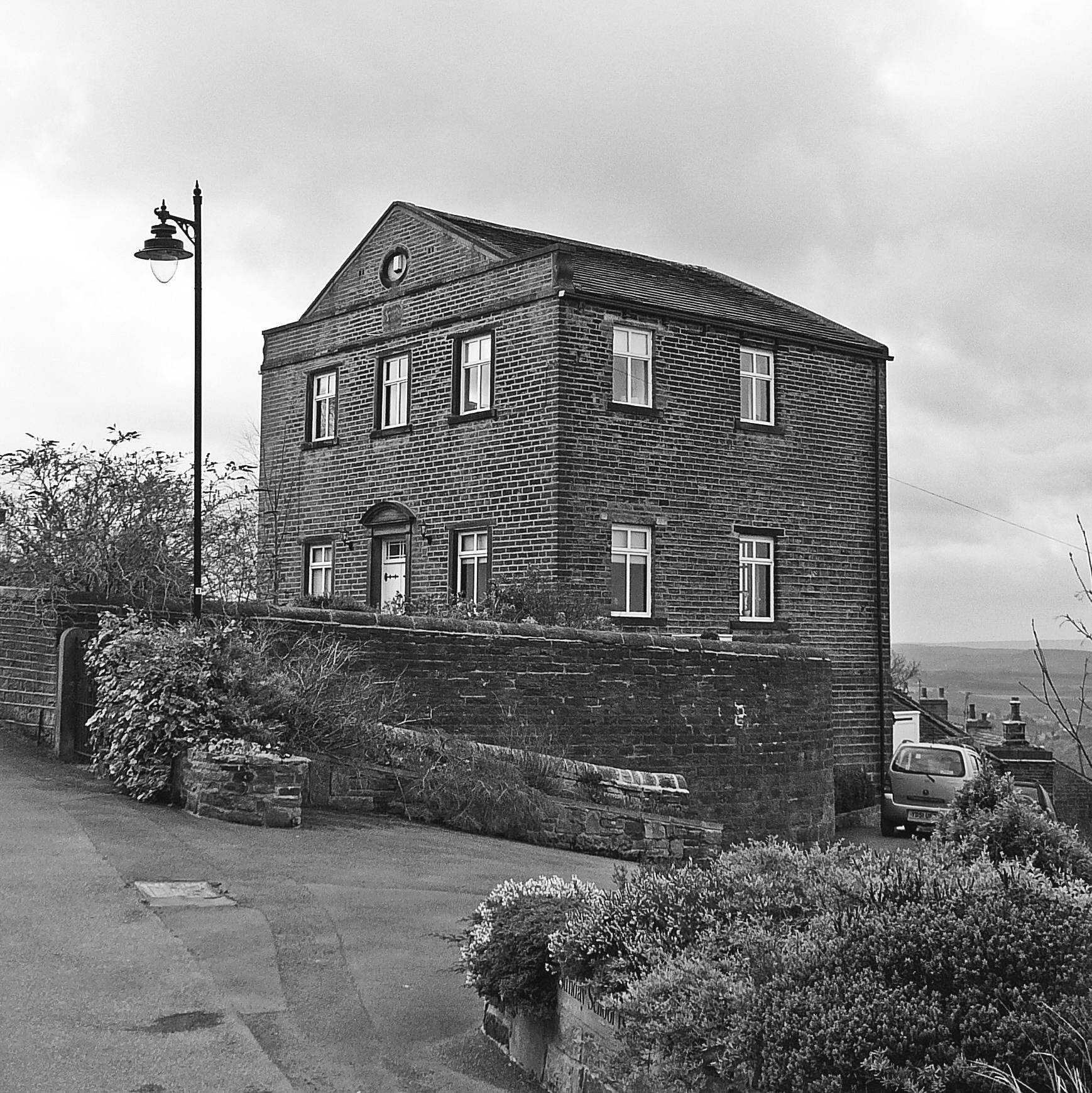
Dissenters' Chapel, Thurstonland, where Lloyd preached

He was curate in charge of Thurstonland under Rev. Richard Collins (1794–1882), vicar of Kirkburton, from 1861 to 1865. The church used the old dissenters' chapel room before the Church of St Thomas was built in 1870. In 1865 he was described as incumbent of Thurstonland. On Friday 23 June 1865, Lloyd took part in the annual Thurstonland church school feast, along with the schoolchildren, teachers, local inhabitants, the Kirkburton Temperance Band and four other clergy from Holmbridge, Upperthong, Armitage Bridge and Lockwood. He made a speech welcoming the new school master, James Beauland. In December 1865 he resigned his "miserable pittance" of a £90 curate's stipend and his sole charge of Thurstonland for a more remunerative living in the diocese of Durham.

On the evening of Saturday 3 February 1866, at the behest of the Thurstonland schoolchildren, a "farewell tea party" was held at the school to present Lloyd with a "richly ornamented, silver-mounted and gold-plated" inkstand, made by Cooper of Huddersfield. Lloyd was presented with a testimonial, and the school superintendent Thomas Rogers said that Lloyd's ministry at Thurstonfield had been "a work of faith and a labour of love." Lloyd's curacy had been "five eventful years" and his name would "never be forgotten."

==== Outspokenness about local church politics ====
The annual Christmas tea party for 300 villagers took place on 28 December 1865 at Thurstonland village school on Manchester Road. There was a choir, there were speeches, and Lloyd was chairman. His speech gives a hint of his character and of local church politics. Lloyd told of a local independent minister who had attended a service at St Thomas and had subsequently ridiculed and abused Rev. Lloyd's "ritual and Catholic doctrine" in front of his chapel congregation. Lloyd reassured the village that a chapel service, should he attend one, would "disgust him" in turn. He wished his audience the "compliments of the season," encouraged them to attend St Thomas's services and social activities, and to support local charities.

=== Trimdon ===
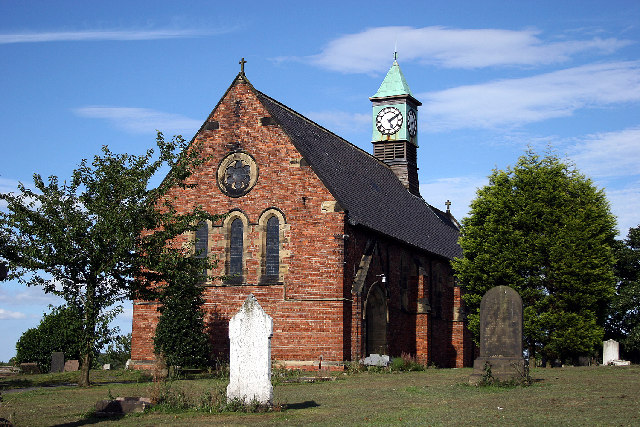
St Paul's Church, Trimdon

In 1866 he accepted the curacy of St Paul, Trimdon, later Deaf Hill cum Langdale, County Durham, which has since been closed.

=== Church Gresley ===
By Friday 5 May 1865, Lloyd was being described by the Derby Mercury as the incumbent of the parish of Church Gresley, although he was still officially curate of Thurstonland. On that day his son, Master George William Lloyd aged 5 years, was laying the foundation stone of two new Church Gresley schools in the face of a "thunderstorm, which came down in good earnest as to delay and, in a measure, to mar the proceedings of the day, and cause discomfort to all who were present." On Tuesday 4 April 1866, Lloyd chaired a penny reading meeting at Church Gresley, with the intention that the literate would entertain the rural poor with improving readings and songs; for example Tennyson's poem Dora was read and well received. In his final speech of thanks, Lloyd "expressed a hope that some good had been derived from these meetings by the class for which they were especially intended."

In 1869 in Church Gresley Lloyd presented 40 candidates for confirmation:. They came from the mining area of Gresley, Swadlincote and Newhall, a reflection on the size of the local congregations at that time. The size of the Church Gresley congregation was such that in the same year a parish meeting requested Lloyd to engage the architect Arthur Blomfield to enlarge the church.

==== Outspokenness and threat of assassination ====
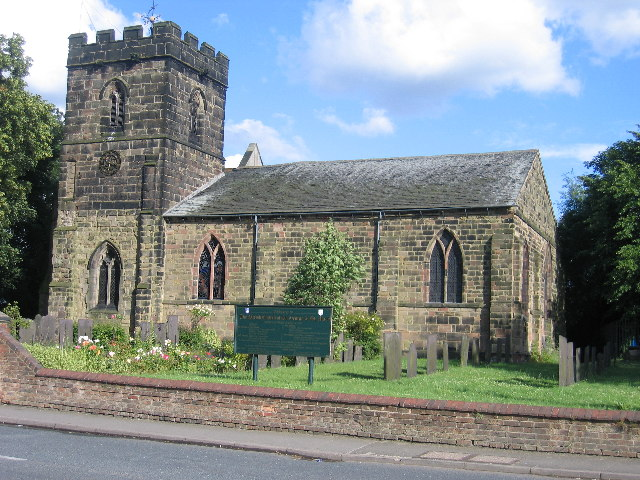
St George and St Mary's Church, Church Gresley

On Wednesday 10 October 1866, in response to the continuing efforts of the Reform League to enfranchise working men, and to the associated London riots and northern ironworks strikes of that year, Lloyd wrote to the Darlington Mercury, appealing to Parliament "to put all trade unions under the iron heel of the law, and stamp them out as the vilest rinderpest that England has ever known." By the following Friday he had received an anonymous letter threatening in colourful language to assassinate him. It said:

Sir, I wonder very much at a man like you pretending to be a faithful follower of Christ to act in the unjust way that you are doing for I assure you that you are not following the precepts of our Saviour by so fondly embracing and cherishing and upholding the unjust Claims of the Masters and at the same time despising the poor working Men and trying to drive them in to work below the country price and to make black sheep of them, but A man holding the position that you hold should try to make white sheep ... if I ever see another Letter from you ... you may preach your own funeral sermon... I will shoot you dead as A Nit ... I will Nap your pecker ... I will Crok you ... for I may as well be hung for a Mule as a Donkey.

Lloyd and his would-be Nemesis were not to know that the Reform Act 1867 was to be successful and that Lloyd was to live another nineteen years; the posturing of both came to nothing.

=== Cramlington ===
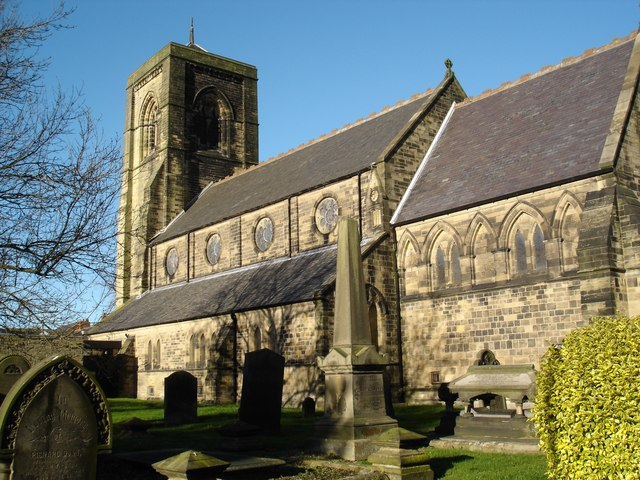
St Nicholas Church, Cramlington

By 1871 he was curate of Cramlington. On 6 May 1871 he was elected as one of two clergymen to represent the clergy at the Lichfield diocesan conference 1871–1873. In 1873 he owned land in the area of Donisthorpe, not far from his previous parish at Church Gresley.

== Publications ==
At some date before 1865 he was editor of the Irish Sunday School Teachers' Magazine, published by Alexander Smith Mayne (1805–1894) in Belfast. In 1865 he was advertising in the Huddersfield Chronicle a penny pamphlet, written by himself, called The Yorkshire Blacksmith.
