= Yorkshire Archaeological and Historical Society =

Company in the United Kingdom

The Yorkshire Archaeological and Historical Society (YAHS), formerly known as the Yorkshire Archaeological Society, is a learned society and registered charity founded in 1863. It is dedicated to the study of the archaeology, history and people of the three Ridings of the historic county of Yorkshire. It publishes an annual journal, the Yorkshire Archaeological Journal; and, particularly through its Record Series, it also functions as a text publication society. Its headquarters are in Leeds.

The Society has seven special interest groups, such as the Family History or the Roman Antiquities sections. These may be joined without full membership of the main YAHS.

== History ==
The Society was founded in 1863 as the Huddersfield Archaeological and Topographical Association. The initial purpose was to facilitate renewed excavations at Slack Roman fort, and later to promote interest in the history and archaeology of the Huddersfield area. The principal instigator was George Lloyd (1820–1885). In 1870 the society expanded its interests to cover the whole of Yorkshire, and changed its name accordingly to the Yorkshire Archaeological Society. In 1896 it moved its headquarters from Huddersfield to Leeds. In 2015 it changed its name again to the Yorkshire Archaeological and Historical Society.

From 1968 the Society had its headquarters at "Claremont", a large house built in the 1770s, close to the main campus of the University of Leeds. Negotiations began to sell "Claremont" in 2016, with the aim of opening smaller office accommodation in the same vicinity.

== Prehistory Section ==
The Prehistory Section has an active programme and a regular publication for section members called The Bulletin. The aim is to bring together those with an interest in the prehistoric archaeology of the region.

== Roman Antiquities Section ==
The Roman Antiquities Section meets for lectures about five times a year. It has an annual Bulletin for section members and occasional monographs.

== Medieval Section ==
The Medieval Section meets about three times a year at locations suited to the subject matter of the day schools. It publishes Medieval Yorkshire, an annual publication free to section members.

== Industrial History Section ==
The Industrial History Section has a very active programme of lectures, visits and informal social events. It publishes three newsletters a year for section members.

== Family History Section ==
The Family History Section has monthly lectures at Claremont and a Workshop for section members every Tuesday afternoon. It publishes a quarterly newsletter, The Yorkshire Family Historian.

The Society also has two publishing only sections :

1. The Parish Register Section transcribes, annotates and prints Parish Registers from the region. The section's aim is to produce one volume a year.
2. The Wakefield Court Roll Section publishes manorial rolls from the Manor of Wakefield.

== Collections ==
The Society possesses a library of some 45,000 works, which has been described as "probably the largest single resource for research on Yorkshire's past outside the British Library"; and also an extensive collection of manuscripts, including many papers of early antiquarians. These collections were formerly held at its headquarters, "Claremont"; but in 2015, in anticipation the sale of the building, were transferred to the custody of the Brotherton Library of the University of Leeds, where they are now accessible through the Library's Special Collections section.
