= Listed buildings in Almondbury =

Almondbury is a village and an unparished area in the metropolitan borough of Kirklees, West Yorkshire, England. Almondbury ward contains 118 listed buildings that are recorded in the National Heritage List for England. Of these, one is listed at Grade I, the highest of the three grades, four are at Grade II*, the middle grade, and the others are at Grade II, the lowest grade. The ward contains the village of Almondbury, the district of Moldgreen, and the surrounding area. Most of the listed buildings are houses and associated structures, cottages, farmhouses and farm buildings. Many of the houses were used in the domestic textile industry, and have long ranges of mullioned windows, especially in the upper storeys. The other listed buildings include a church and associated structures, a cross socket, textile mills, a mounting block, a public house, a police box, and a telephone kiosk.

== Key ==
Grade	Criteria
I	Buildings of exceptional interest, sometimes considered to be internationally important
II*	Particularly important buildings of more than special interest
II	Buildings of national importance and special interest

== Buildings ==
Name and location	Photograph	Date	Notes	Grade
All Hallows Church; 53.63179°N 1.74695°W		13th century	The oldest part of the church is the chancel, much of the rest of the church dates from 1486, and it was altered and restored by W. H. Crossland in 1872–76. The church is built in stone with stone slate roofs, and consists of a nave with a clerestory, north and south aisles, a south porch, a chancel with chapels, and a west tower. The tower has diagonal buttresses, a west door, a three-light west window with Perpendicular tracery, gargoyles, and an embattled parapet with crocketed pinnacles. The parapets of the body of the church are also embattled with crocketed pinnacles, and in the chancel are lancet windows.	I
Cross socket, Fenny Hall; 53.63334°N 1.73537°W		Medieval (probable)	The cross socket on the south side of the drive to the hall consists of a stone with chamfered edges and a hole for the socket. It has probably been moved from elsewhere.	II
Fenny Hall; 53.63309°N 1.73308°W	—	16th century	The hall originated as a timber framed house, and it was encased in stone and extended and remodelled during the following centuries. The house is rendered, with sill bands, a moulded eaves cornice, and a hipped stone slate roof. There are two storeys and a south front of five bays. The three bays to the right are older, the middle bay projecting and gabled, and they contain sash windows and a doorway approached by steps, with a moulded surround, a fluted frieze, and a pediment. The two bays on the left are gabled, and the upper storey is timber framed, with a decorative bressumer, elaborate bargeboards, and moulded finials.	II*
Wormall's Hall; 53.63138°N 1.74661°W		16th century	A house, later used for other purposes, it is timber framed, the ground floor was encased in stone in 1631 by its owner Isaac Wormall, from whom the building takes its name. The roof is in stone slate. There are two storeys and an attic, the upper storey jettied, and a rear wing. To the left is a carriage entrance, and in the ground floor is a flat-arched doorway with a moulded surround and moulded imposts, flanked by seven-light mullioned windows. The upper floor contains three mullioned and transomed oriel windows.	II*
Thorpe Farm Barn; 53.63547°N 1.73710°W	—	16th or 17th century	The barn is cruck-framed, the south side is timber framed with red brick infill, there is a north aisle in stone, the west wing is timber framed with stone infill, and there is a stone extension to the north. The roofs are in stone slate. There are various openings and a gabled porch. Inside, there are five bays and five cruck trusses.	II*
Remains of Wilberlee Cottage, Slaithwaite; 53.64446°N 1.75606°W	—	1634	The remains of the cottage have been re-erected in Ravensknowle Park. They are in stone, and consist of parts of a wall, a doorway, and half of a window. The doorway has chamfered surrounds and a four-centred dated head. The window has chamfered mullions and a hood mould.	II
42–46 Townend; 53.63599°N 1.75115°W		17th century (probable)	A group of stone houses that have a stone slate roof with coped gables and cut kneelers. There are two storeys and attics, a single-storey lean-to on the north side, and a moulded string course on the east side. The building contains a doorway with a four-centred arched head, and the windows are mullioned, with some mullions removed.	II*
135 Fleming House Lane; 53.64025°N 1.73615°W	—	17th or 18th century	The house, which was largely rebuilt in the 19th century, is in stone with a stone slate roof. There are two storeys, and the windows are mullioned. Some internal features have been retained, including an inglenook fireplace and a chamfered bressumer.	II
Stocks; 53.63163°N 1.74719°W	—	17th or 18th century	The stocks are in the churchyard of All Hallows Church. They consist of two upright stone posts, a lower plate in stone, and a timber upper plate. There are four holes and iron clamps.	II
49 Townend; 53.63626°N 1.75086°W	—	Early 18th century	A stone house with stone gutter brackets, a stone slate roof, and two storeys. Some windows are mullioned, and some mullions have been removed and replaced by sash windows. The doorway has a moulded surround.	II
Thorpe Farmhouse; 53.63572°N 1.73696°W	—	Early 18th century	The house is in stone, and has a stone slate roof with a coped gable and cut kneelers at the east end. There are two storeys, and a doorway with a moulded surround and a four-centred arched head. Some of the windows are mullioned and others are modern.	II
38 and 40 Broken Cross; 53.63000°N 1.75557°W	—	18th century	A pair of rendered houses that have a stone slate roof with coped gables. In the centre are two doorways, and the windows are mullioned, with four lights in the ground floor and six lights in the upper floor.	II
Wall to east of 245 Fleming House Lane; 53.63553°N 1.73550°W	—	18th century	The wall runs from the house as far as the stable and coach house. It is in red brick with stone coping, and is ramped up at the ends. The wall has a serpentine shape, and is 12 feet (3.7 m) high.	II
14 and 16 Longcroft; 53.63097°N 1.75084°W	—	18th century	A pair of stone houses with quoins, a stone slate roof, and two storeys. There are two doorways, and the windows are mullioned sashes with some lights blocked.	II
56 Lumb Lane; 53.62336°N 1.75753°W		18th century	A stone house with a stone slate roof and two storeys. The windows are mullioned casements; in the upper floor is a twelve-light window, and the ground floor contains a five light and a two-light window.	II
91 Northgate; 53.63330°N 1.74752°W	—	18th century (possible)	A house later used for other purposes, it is in stone, with stone gutter brackets and a stone slate roof with coped gables and cut kneelers. There are two storeys and two bays. In the centre are two doorways, and the windows are mullioned.	II
93–97 Northgate; 53.63314°N 1.74749°W	—	18th century	The building is in stone with a stone slate roof and two storeys. In the ground floor are three doorways and a shop window. The other windows vary; some are mullioned, some are sashes, and others are casements.	II
30 and 32 Sharp Lane; 53.62820°N 1.74929°W	—	18th century	Part of a former mill, No. 30 having been a weaving shed, the building is in stone with a stone slate roof and two storeys. No. 30 has mullioned casement windows, and the windows in No. 32 are sashes.	II
Barn north of 44 Townend; 53.63611°N 1.75131°W	—	18th century (probable)	The barn is in stone, and has a stone slate roof with moulded finials on the ridge. The main entrance has a segmental head with brick voussoirs.	II
21 and 23 St Helens Gate; 53.63116°N 1.74552°W	—	18th century	A pair of houses in red brick, mainly rendered, with a brick band, and a double pitched stone slate roof. There are two storeys, a double-depth plan, and four bays. The doorway is in the second bay, and the windows are sashes.	II
21, 21A and 23 Westgate; 53.63124°N 1.74703°W	—	18th century (or earlier)	A row of three houses, later shops, in rendered stone, with a stone slate roof, and two storeys. In the ground floor are shop fronts, and the windows are mullioned.	II
Barn west of 193 Westgate; 53.63018°N 1.75039°W	—	18th century (probable)	The barn is in stone and has a stone slate roof. On the south side is a lean-to outshut.	II
Birks; 53.63074°N 1.73588°W	—	18th century (probable)	A group consisting of a house and a barn, both in stone, and a cottage in red brick, all with stone slate roofs. The house has two storeys and a rear lean-to outshut, and contains mullioned sash windows. In the barn are two stable doors, a barn door, and three circular pitching holes. The cottage has two storeys, and contains mullioned windows.	II
Fenny Bridge Nurseries; 53.63498°N 1.72919°W	—	18th century	Originally a laithe house, it is in stone with a stone slate roof. The house has two storeys with mullioned windows in the upper floor and modern windows in the ground floor, the barn has a planked door, and there is an extension to the southeast.	II
Finthorpe; 53.63565°N 1.73590°W	—	Mid 18th century	A stone house with quoins, a band, a modillion eaves cornice, a parapet, and a stone slate roof. There are two storeys and a front of five bays. The central doorway has a moulded surround, a fanlight, a pulvinated frieze, and a moulded cornice, and the windows are sashes. At the rear are three bays, and a central Venetian window.	II
Stable and coach house, Finthorpe; 53.63557°N 1.73528°W	—	18th century	The stable and coach house are in stone, and have a stone slate roof with coped gables and cut kneelers. There are two storeys and a single-storey lean-to on the east side. In the main part are segmental-headed coach entrances, partly blocked, and in the extension are doorways.	II
Finthorpe Cottage and 245 Fleming House Lane; 53.63570°N 1.73563°W	—	18th century	A pair of stone cottages that have a stone slate roof with coped gables and cut kneelers, and two storeys. No. 245 has mullioned window and a staircase window in the garden front, and the other windows are modern. Finthorpe Cottage contains oriel windows and sashes.	II
Lower Castle Hill Farmhouse; 53.62280°N 1.76473°W	—	18th century (or earlier)	The farmhouse and barn are in stone with a stone slate roof, two storeys, and an L-shaped plan. The earlier windows are mullioned, with some lights blocked, and the later windows are sashes. In the barn are planked doors.	II
Lumb; 53.62077°N 1.76471°W	—	18th century	A stone house with a stone slate roof and two storeys. The windows are mullioned, and some lights have been blocked.	II
Ogley; 53.62103°N 1.77037°W	—	18th century (probable)	A rendered house with a stone slate roof. It consists of two two-storey blocks, with a single-storey block between them, and there is a barn extension to the east. Most of the windows are mullioned, and others are casements.	II
The Lumb; 53.62086°N 1.76449°W	—	18th century	The house is in stone with a stone slate roof and two storeys. The windows are mullioned, with two three-light windows in the ground floor, and a 14-light window in the upper floor.	II
Entrance block and extensions, King James's School; 53.62985°N 1.74182°W	—	c. 1760	The oldest surviving part of the school, which was founded in 1608, is the entrance block. In 1848–49 a schoolroom with a dormitory above was added at the northwest, and in 1880–84 a service extension and schoolroom were added at the north, designed by W. Swinden Barber. The buildings are in stone with stone slate roofs, and the windows are mullioned.	II
155 Ashes Lane; 53.62523°N 1.76969°W	—	18th or 19th century	A stone house with a stone slate roof and two storeys. The windows are mullioned, and at the rear is a barn with two pairs of doors.	II
157 and 159 Ashes Lane; 53.62500°N 1.77050°W	—	18th or 19th century	A house and a former barn, they are in stone, partly rendered, with quoins and a stone slate roof. The house has two storeys, one doorway, and one modern window, and the other windows are mullioned. The barn has a door, a loft window, and two rear outshuts, one with a four-light mullioned window.	II
165–169 Ashes Lane; 53.62095°N 1.77595°W	—	18th or 19th century	A row of stone cottages, partly rendered, with a stone slate roof, and two storeys. There is one modern casement window, and the other windows are mullioned. To the west is a barn with a segmental-arched cart entry, doorways, and a lean-to outshut.	II
42 and 44 Broken Cross; 53.63003°N 1.75543°W	—	18th or 19th century	A stone house with a stone slate roof and two storeys. In the centre is a gabled porch, and the windows are mullioned, with two four-light windows in the ground floor, and four two-light windows in the upper floor.	II
142 Fleming House Lane; 53.63936°N 1.73568°W	—	18th or early 19th century	The house is in rendered stone with a stone slate roof, and has one storey and an extension to the east. Some of the windows are sashes. others are mullioned, and in the extension is a loading door.	II
145–149 Fleming House Lane; 53.63948°N 1.73518°W	—	18th or early 19th century	A row of stone houses with a stone slate roof. There are two storeys, and a projecting central rear wing. At the rear are 19th-century casement windows, and most of the other windows are modern.	II
3 and 5 St Helens Gate; 53.63140°N 1.74615°W	—	18th or early 19th century	A pair of stone houses with a stone slate roof. There are two storeys and four bays. The doors are modern, one has a fanlight, and the windows are small-paned.	II
7 St Helens Gate; 53.63135°N 1.74599°W	—	18th or early 19th century	A stone house in a row, it has a stone slate roof and two storeys. The doorway is to the left, and the windows are sashes, with two on the ground floor and three in the upper floor.	II
9 and 11 St Helens Gate; 53.63132°N 1.74589°W	—	18th or early 19th century	A pair of stone houses in a row, with a stone slate roof and two storeys. No. 11 has a sash window in the ground floor, the other windows are mullioned, and in the upper floor of No. 9 is a loading door converted into a window.	II
13 St Helens Gate; 53.63126°N 1.74580°W	—	18th or early 19th century	A stone house in a terrace with a stone slate roof, two storeys, and one bay. The doorway is to the right, in the ground floor is a modern window, and the upper floor contains a four-light mullioned sash window.	II
15, 17 and 19 St Helens Gate; 53.63124°N 1.74568°W	—	18th or early 19th century	A group of stone houses with a stone slate roof and two storeys. There is one fixed window, and the other windows are mullioned, with some blocked lights.	II
47 Townend; 53.63633°N 1.75089°W	—	18th or early 19th century	A stone house that has a stone slate roof with coped gables and cut kneelers. There are two storeys and one range of four-light mullioned sash windows.	II
Barn south of 49 Townend; 53.63600°N 1.75060°W	—	18th or 19th century	The barn is in stone with a stone slate roof, and has outshuts on the south, east and north sides. It contains various openings, including barn doors with arched heads.	II
63 Westgate; 53.63080°N 1.74766°W	—	18th or early 19th century	A stone house with a stone slate roof and two storeys. There is one casement window, and the other windows are mullioned sashes, with a two-light window in the ground floor, and two four-light windows in the upper floor.	II
65 Westgate; 53.63074°N 1.74757°W	—	18th or early 19th century	A stone house with a stone slate roof and two storeys. There is one fixed window, and the other windows are mullioned sashes, with some lights blocked.	II
181 Westgate; 53.63019°N 1.74983°W	—	18th or early 19th century	A stone house with a stone slate roof and two storeys. The windows are mullioned, and some lights are blocked.	II
193 Westgate; 53.63025°N 1.75031°W	—	18th or early 19th century	A stone house in a row, with a stone slate roof and two storeys. The doorway is to the left, and the windows are mullioned, with a three light window in the ground floor, and a six-light window in the upper floor, the middle two lights blocked.	II
Bottoms 40 Lumb Lane; 53.62503°N 1.75359°W	—	18th or early 19th century	A stone house with a stone slate roof and two storeys. In the upper floor is a six-light mullioned window.	II
Bottoms 42 Lumb Lane; 53.62502°N 1.75367°W	—	18th or early 19th century	A stone house with a stone slate roof and two storeys. In the upper floor is a ten-light mullioned window with two lights blocked.	II
Bottoms 44 Lumb Lane; 53.62500°N 1.75379°W	—	18th or early 19th century	A stone house with a stone slate roof and two storeys. In the upper floor is a twelve-light mullioned window with two lights blocked.	II
Bottoms 46 Lumb Lane; 53.62498°N 1.75390°W	—	18th or early 19th century	A stone house with a stone slate roof and two storeys. In the upper floor is an eight-light mullioned window with two lights blocked.	II
Bottoms 48 Lumb Lane; 53.62499°N 1.75399°W	—	18th or early 19th century	A stone house with a stone slate roof and two storeys. In the upper floor is an eight-light mullioned window with two lights blocked.	II
Bottoms 50 Lumb Lane; 53.62494°N 1.75407°W		18th or early 19th century	A stone house with a stone slate roof and two storeys. In the upper floor is an eight-light mullioned window with two lights blocked.	II
Castle Hill Side; 53.62237°N 1.76892°W	—	18th or 19th century	A stone house with a stone slate roof and two storeys. The windows vary, and include sashes, casements, and two mullioned windows, one with three lights in the ground floor, and on with four lights in the upper floor.	II
Clough Hall; 53.62644°N 1.76485°W	—	18th or early 19th century	A row of four houses with a hipped stone slate roof, and two storeys. They are mainly in stone, and the middle two houses project slightly and have fronts of red brick with quoins. Each house has two bays, and they contain casement windows.	II
Fenny Grange Farmhouse; 53.63227°N 1.73777°W	—	18th or early 19th century	The farmhouse is in stone with a hipped stone slate roof, two storeys and three bays. Some windows are sashes and others are modern, and there are two doorways with arched heads and imposts. At the rear is a long barn with two storeys and round-arched entries, and at the west end is an extension containing a cowshed with a hayloft. The openings include a pigeon hole with a semicircular sill.	II
Mounting block 53.64468°N 1.75598°W	—	18th or early 19th century	The mounting block in Ravensknowle Park has been moved from Honley. It is in stone, and consists of a circular pier with a moulded sill. Cantilevered from the pier are two spiral flights of four steps.	II
South Parade; 53.62755°N 1.74945°W	—	18th or 19th century	A house with a coach house extension to the left, it is in stone with a stone slate roof. The house has two storeys and contains sash windows, and in the coach house are four entries, two with depressed arched heads.	II
St Helen's Mill House; 53.63096°N 1.74236°W	—	18th or early 19th century	The house is in red brick, rendered on the left side, with a sill band, a moulded eaves cornice, and a hipped stone slate roof. There are two storeys and four bays, the right bay recessed. On the front are two doorways each approached by seven steps with railings. The main doorway has a moulded surround with Tuscan half-columns, a fanlight, an entablature, and a segmental pediment, and the doorway to the right has a moulded surround, a frieze with paterae, and a cornice. The windows are sashes with voussoirs and keystones. At the rear is a round-arched stair window with imposts and keystones, and there are two doorways.	II
The Woolpack Public House; 53.63129°N 1.74680°W		18th or 19th century	The public house is in stone with a stone slate roof. There are two storeys and four bays, the left bay containing a flat-headed entry. The windows are sashes, some with mullions.	II
Wheat Royd; 53.62727°N 1.75608°W	—	18th or early 19th century	The house is in stone with a stone slate roof. There are two storeys, four bays, a barn to the west, and a later extension. The windows vary, some are mullioned, some are sashes, and others are casements.	II
246 Fleming House Lane; 53.63634°N 1.73645°W	—	Early 19th century	A stone house, partly rendered, with a stone slate roof and two storeys. The windows are mullioned, and one mullion has been removed.	II
Croft House; 53.63086°N 1.74702°W	—	Early 19th century (probable)	The house is in stone with a stone slate roof. There are two storeys and five bays, the middle bay projecting under a pediment. The doorway has pilasters and an oblong fanlight, and the windows are casements. On the front is a canted bay window, and at the rear is a round-arched staircase window.	II
Vine Cottage; 53.63974°N 1.75677°W	—	Early 19th century	A stone house with a stone slate roof and two storeys. The windows are mullioned sashes; there is a three-light window in the ground floor, and a 13-light window in the upper floor.	II
141 Ravensknowle Road; 53.64402°N 1.75465°W	—	c. 1830–40	Originally the offices to Ravensknowle Park, they consist of three blocks forming a U-shaped plan around a courtyard. The buildings are in stone, each with a moulded eaves cornice, and a hipped slate roof. They have one storey, and most of the windows are sash windows. The blocks are linked by a gateway with a round arch, a Gibbs surround and it contains ornamental cast iron gates. The gateway is surrounded by Tuscan pilasters and a full entablature surmounted by an achievement.	II
1 Fernside Avenue; 53.63748°N 1.75308°W		Early to mid 19th century	A stone house with a stone slate roof, three storeys, one bay, and mullioned windows. The doorway is to the right, in the ground floor is a five-light window, and the upper floors each contains an eight-light window.	II
3 Fernside Avenue; 53.63751°N 1.75301°W	—	Early or mid 19th century	A stone house with a stone slate roof, three storeys, one bay, and mullioned windows. The doorway is to the left, and in each floor is a six-light window, with a light blocked in the middle floor.	II
99–101 Northgate; 53.63297°N 1.747436°W	—	Early or mid 19th century	A pair of stone shops with a sill band, a moulded eaves cornice, and a blocking course. There are three storeys and five bays, the middle bay slightly recessed. In No. 99 is an early 20th-century shop front, and No. 101 has a modern entrance in an arch with moulded voussoirs and imposts.	II
31 St Helens Gate; 53.63120°N 1.74510°W	—	Early or mid 19th century	A stone house with a stone slate roof, two storeys and three bays. There are two doorways with Tuscan surrounds and cornices, one with a fanlight, and the windows are two-light sashes.	II
Barn behind 65 Westgate; 53.63060°N 1.74747°W	—	Early or mid 19th century	The barn is in stone with a stone slate roof, two storeys, and an extension to the southwest. It contains a doorway with a segmental head, and another doorway with a loading door above. In the extension is a door with a 6 feet (1.8 m) monolithic lintel.	II
Thorpe Villa; 53.63369°N 1.74757°W	—	Early or mid 19th century	A stone house with a sill band, a moulded eaves cornice, a blocking course, and a hipped stone slate roof. There are two storeys and five bays. On the front is a tetrastyle Tuscan portico in antis with a segmental pediment. The windows are sashes, the window above the portico has a moulded surround, and at the rear is a round-headed staircase window.	II
232 Almondbury Bank; 53.63922°N 1.75709°W	—	19th century	A stone house in a row, with stone gutter brackets, a stone slate roof, two storeys, and three bays. In the upper floor is a seven-light mullioned window.	II
236 Almondbury Bank; 53.63915°N 1.75698°W	—	19th century	A stone house in a row, with stone gutter brackets, a stone slate roof, two storeys, and three bays. In the upper floor is a nine-light mullioned window.	II
22 Longcroft; 53.63106°N 1.75086°W	—	19th century	A stone house in a terrace with a stone slate roof and two storeys. The windows are mullioned, with one mullion removed in the ground floor, and two lights blocked in the upper floor.	II
24 Longcroft; 53.63112°N 1.75092°W	—	19th century	A stone house in a terrace with a stone slate roof and two storeys. The windows are mullioned, with a three-light window in the upper floor, and a two-light window with a mullion removed in the ground floor.	II
26 Longcroft; 53.63119°N 1.75097°W	—	19th century	A stone house in a terrace with a stone slate roof and two storeys. The windows are mullioned, with a seven-light window in the upper floor and none light blocked, and a four-light window in the ground floor.	II
28 Longcroft; 53.63124°N 1.75102°W	—	19th century	A stone house in a terrace with a stone slate roof and two storeys. The windows are mullioned, with a five-light window in the upper floor, and a three-light window in the ground floor.	II
32 and 34 Longcroft; 53.63131°N 1.75103°W	—	19th century	A pair of houses in a terrace with a stone slate roof and two storeys. There is one casement window, and the other windows are mullioned.	II
36 Longcroft; 53.63135°N 1.75090°W	—	19th century	A stone house at the end of a terrace with a stone slate roof and two storeys. The windows are casements.	II
34 and 36 Lumb Lane; 53.62546°N 1.75269°W	—	19th century	A pair of stone houses with a stone slate roof and two storeys. There is one picture window, and the other woodwinds are mullioned.	II
54 Lumb Lane; 53.62342°N 1.75744°W		19th century	A stone house with a stone slate roof and two storeys. The windows are mullioned with casements.	II
14 Northgate; 53.63457°N 1.74932°W	—	19th century	A house in a row, it is in stone, with a sill band, a stone slate roof, and two storeys. The windows are mullioned, flanking the central doorway are three-light windows, and the upper floor contains a continuous ten-light window.	II
47–51 Northgate; 53.63432°N 1.74862°W		19th century	A house, at one time a public house, it is in stone with a sill band, a moulded eaves cornice, and a hipped stone slate roof. There are two storeys, six bays on the south front, and three on the west front. The doorway on the south front has pilasters and a segmental pediment, there is a doorway with a plain surround on the west front, and the windows are sashes.	II
55 and 55A Northgate; 53.63412°N 1.74837°W	—	Mid 19th century	A pair of stone houses with a sill band, paired gutter brackets, and a stone slate roof. There are two storeys and four bays. The doorways have fanlights, and the windows are sashes.	II
59 and 61 Northgate; 53.63387°N 1.74809°W		Mid 19th century	A pair of stone houses with a sill band, paired gutter brackets, and a stone slate roof. There are two storeys and four bays. The doorways have fanlights, and the windows are sashes.	II
Wall behind 89 Northgate; 53.63373°N 1.74675°W	—	19th century	The wall extends from the rear of 89 Northgate, running along Thorpe Lane as far as Thorpe Grange. It is in stone with coping, and is 10 feet (3.0 m) high.	II
177 and 179 Northgate; 53.63167°N 1.74600°W		Mid 19th century	A stone house with a sill band, stone gutter brackets, and a stone slate roof. There are two storeys, and a symmetrical front of three bays. The central doorway has Tuscan pilasters, a fanlight, and a segmental pediment, and the windows are sashes.	II
14 and 16 Sharp Lane; 53.62835°N 1.74861°W	—	19th century	A pair of stone houses that have a stone slate roof with coped gables and moulded kneelers. The windows are mullioned, with two three-light windows on the ground floor, and four two-light windows in the upper floor.	II
87 Townend; 53.63517°N 1.74962°W	—	19th century	A stone house with a sill band, a stone slate roof, and three storeys. The windows are mullioned, and some lights are blocked.	II
43 Victoria Street; 53.64437°N 1.76087°W	—	19th century	A stone house on a plinth, with rusticated quoins, and a hipped stone slate roof. There are two storeys and a symmetrical front of three bays. The central doorway has Tuscan pilasters, an oblong fanlight, a dentilled entablature, and a blocking course containing a wreath in relief. The windows are sashes with moulded surrounds, those in the ground floor with aprons.	II
32 and 34 Westgate; 53.63085°N 1.74876°W	—	19th century (or earlier)	A pair of rendered stone houses with a stone slate roof and two storeys. There are two doorways, and the windows are sashes.	II
40–44 Westgate; 53.63076°N 1.74906°W	—	19th century	A row of three houses in rendered brick at the front and stone elsewhere with stone slate roofs. There are two storeys, No. 44 is higher, and at the rear is an outshut. The windows are mullioned, some containing sashes and the others casements.	II
Walls and gates, All Hallows Church; 53.63143°N 1.74688°W	—	19th century	The walls enclosing the churchyard are in stone with coped tops. The gate to the east of the church is in cast iron, and is elaborate with Art Nouveau features. To the south of the church are decorative cast iron gates, and gate piers that are rusticated and have ball finials. Incorporated in the wall to the southwest of the tower is an inscribed plaque.	II
Bankfield House; 53.64192°N 1.76209°W	—	Mid 19th century	A stone house with a moulded eaves cornice and a hipped slate roof. There are two storeys and a symmetrical front of three bays. The windows are sashes, and the central doorway has a moulded surround, a fanlight, and a moulded cornice on moulded consoles.	II
Wall and gate piers, Bankfield House; 53.64213°N 1.76167°W	—	Mid 19th century	Flanking the entrance to the drive are stone gate piers with sunk panels and moulded caps. Between them are ornamental cast iron gates, and the flanking dwarf walls have moulded coping.	II
Bankfield Mill and railings 53.64287°N 1.76429°W		Mid 19th century	The mill building is in stone with rusticated quoins, alternately vermiculated, a sill band, moulded gutter brackets, and a hipped slate roof. There are three storeys and a basement, and eight bays. The windows are sashes, those in the ground floor with round arched heads, alternately rusticated voussoirs, sunk aprons, and a moulded impost band. The doorway has a semicircular fanlight, and enclosing the basement area are cast iron railings with bulbous and spear finials.	II
Bottoms Farmhouse; 53.62589°N 1.75398°W	—	19th century	A former laithe house, it is in stone with a stone slate roof, and two storeys. The windows are mullioned, and in the former barn, which has been converted for residential use, are the voussoirs of a former segmental-headed entry.	II
Cemetery gates and gate piers 53.63251°N 1.74998°W	—	Mid 19th century	The gate piers are in rusticated stone, and each has a moulded cornice, and pyramidal finials with chamfered corners and ornamental tops. The surviving gate is in cast iron with spear and foliate finials.	II
Clay Hall; 53.62203°N 1.75925°W	—	19th century	A laithe house in stone with a stone slate roof. The house has two storeys and three bays. On the front is a gabled porch and mullioned windows. The barn to the right contains a segmental-arched cart entry and doorways.	II
Fenay Lodge; 53.63478°N 1.74351°W	—	Mid 19th century	A stone house with a moulded eaves cornice and a hipped stone slate roof. There are two storeys, an entrance front of three bays, the middle bay projecting slightly, a garden front of five bays, and a rear wing. In the entrance front is a porch with Tuscan columns, a projecting cornice, and a doorway with a fanlight. Most of the windows are sashes, in the garden front is a canted bay window containing a French window, and at the rear is around-arched staircase window.	II
Coach house, Fenay Lodge; 53.63488°N 1.74386°W	—	Mid 19th century	The coach house is in stone with a hipped roof and two storeys. On the front is an archway with a semicircular lunette above and windows, and in the right return is a Venetian window.	II
Walls and outbuildings, Fenny Grange Farmyard; 53.63229°N 1.73828°W	—	19th century	The walls are in stone, and the wall along Birks Lane is curved. The outbuildings consist of lean-to cart sheds and a mistral, and are in stone with stone slate roofs.	II
Stable block, Fenny Hall; 53.63356°N 1.73270°W	—	Mid 19th century (probable)	The buildings are on three sides of a courtyard and are in stone. The coach house has a hipped slate roof, two storeys, and three bays, the middle bay projecting and gabled. In the centre is a three-centred arched carriage entrance, in both storeys are sash windows, in the gable is a blind semicircular lunette, and the outer bays contain circular oculi. On the west is a two-storey wing, on the east is a one-storey stable wing, and the courtyard is paved and enclosed by a wall.	II
Greenhead; 53.64332°N 1.75031°W	—	Mid 19th century	A stone house with a moulded eaves cornice and a hipped stone slate roof. There are two storeys and fronts of three and four bays. The porch has two Tuscan columns, a full entablature, and a blocking course, the door has a semicircular fanlight, and the windows are sashes.	II
Ing Field House; 53.63399°N 1.74821°W	—	Mid 19th century	A stone house with paired gutter brackets and a hipped stone slate roof. There are two storeys and three bays. At the rear is a moulded eaves cornice and blocking course, and it contains a doorway with three-quarter Tuscan columns and an entablature. The windows are sashes, in the front facing the road is a round-headed stair window and a doorway with a moulded hood.	II
Rushfield House; 53.62769°N 1.74215°W	—	Mid 19th century	A stone house with a sill band, a moulded eaves cornice, a blocking course, and a hipped stone slate roof. There are two storeys and three bays. Three steps lead up to a Tuscan porch with a full entablature and a doorway with a fanlight, and the windows are sashes.	II
Former coach house, Rushfield House; 53.62732°N 1.74297°W	—	Mid 19th century	The former coach house is in stone with a stone slate roof and two storeys. It contains carriage doors with three-centred heads, and above is an oculus and pigeon holes with ledges.	II
Thorpe House; 53.63521°N 1.73855°W	—	Mid 19th century	A stone house that has a stone slate roof with coped gables. There are two storeys, five bays, and later extensions. The doorway has Tuscan pilasters and a moulded cornice. Most of the windows are sashes, in the ground floor are French windows, and at the rear is a round-arched staircase window.	II
Ravensknowle Hall; 53.64495°N 1.75545°W		1859–62	The hall, later used as a museum, is in stone, the ground floor rusticated, with a hipped slate roof, and two storeys and attics, and is in Italianate style. In the centre is a recessed porch with a Doric colonnade and round-arched doorways. Above it is a loggia consisting of an arcade with foliate capitals, over which are oculi and foliate decoration. The windows in the upper floor of the flanking bays, are round-headed, to the left of the porch is a Venetian window, and to the right are flat-headed windows. At the rear is a semicircular bay window with round-headed French windows and foliage decoration in the spandrels and capitals.	II
Stables, Ravensknowle Hall; 53.64497°N 1.75628°W		1859–62	The stables form a U-shaped plan around a courtyard, and are in stone with overhanging eaves on ornamental cast iron brackets, and have a slate roof with coped gables, kneelers and moulded consoles. The courtyard is enclosed by ornamental cast iron gates in a round archway with cresting. The stable buildings have two storeys, and in the centre is a tower with an oculus on each side, a cornice, an ornamental parapet, and an octagonal lantern with a copper-clad ogee dome and a finial. The buildings contain segmental-headed windows and doorways.	II
Lodge, Ravensknowle Park; 53.64559°N 1.75611°W	—	1859–62	The lodge is in stone on a moulded plinth, with coved cornices, overhanging eaves, a hipped slate roof, and one storey. On the front facing the road are a canted bay window and three casement windows, and on the front facing the drive is a V-shaped bay window, a casement window, and a porch on the angle with two pilasters and a central column with foliage capitals.	II
Wall and piers, Ravensknowle Park; 53.64564°N 1.75574°W	—	1859–62	The dwarf wall at the entrance to the park is in stone, and formerly carried railings. It incorporates ten stone piers, each with round-arched panels, a double-curved cap, and a finial with carved foliage in relief.	II
2 Stocks Walk; 53.63110°N 1.74798°W	—	1876	A shop on a corner site, it is in stone on a plinth, with a hipped stone slate roof. There are two storeys, and three bays on each front. The south front contains an archway with moulded imposts and a dated keystone. To its right, and in the east front are shop fronts with rusticated pilasters, and moulded entablatures. The upper floor contains sash windows.	II
The Old Clergy House; 53.63174°N 1.74903°W	—	1898	The house, designed by Edgar Wood, is in stone with a stone slate roof and two storeys. At the west is a coped gable with cut kneelers, in the angle is a wooden porch, and on the south front are two shallow canted bay windows with parapets rising above the eaves. On the west front are raked buttresses, and a blocked doorway with a fanlight and a semicircular hood. At the rear is a corbelled chimney and a canted staircase projection with a hipped roof. The windows have mullions, and some also have transoms.	II
Police box 53.63413°N 1.74855°W		1920s to 1930s	The police box is next to 55 Northgate, it is in timber, and has a rectangular plan. It has a plinth, above which are panels, a moulded string course, a frieze, and a domed roof. On the front is a door on the left, and on the right at mid-height is a smaller door to a public telephone cupboard.	II
Telephone kiosk 53.63294°N 1.74762°W		1935	The telephone kiosk is adjacent to 90 Northgate, and is a K6 type, designed by Giles Gilbert Scott. Constructed in cast iron with a square plan and a dome, it has three unperforated crowns in the top panels.	II
