= Dalton, Huddersfield =

District of Huddersfield, West Yorkshire, England

Coordinates: 53.6512°N 1.7411°W

Dalton
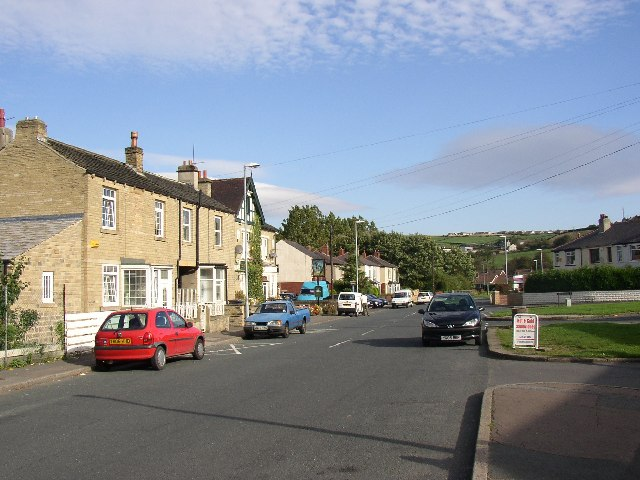
- Street junction in Dalton

- Location within West Yorkshire
- Population: 518 (2011 Census)
- OS grid reference: SE171172
- Metropolitan borough: Kirklees
- Metropolitan county: West Yorkshire
- Region: Yorkshire and the Humber
- Country: England
- Sovereign state: United Kingdom
- Post town: HUDDERSFIELD
- Postcode district: HD5
- Dialling code: 01484
- Police: West Yorkshire
- Fire: West Yorkshire
- Ambulance: Yorkshire
- UK Parliament: Huddersfield

Dalton is a suburb of Huddersfield, in the Kirklees district, in West Yorkshire in England, approximately one mile east of the town centre between Moldgreen, Rawthorpe and Kirkheaton.

Located in a small valley it is mostly housing, with a small number of engineering firms to the north-west, surrounded by farmland used in the production of milk.

Germaine Lindsay, one of the suicide bombers involved in the 7 July 2005 London bombings, had lived in the area following his arrival from Jamaica aged five.

== History ==
The name Dalton derives from the Old English dæltūn meaning 'settlement in a dale'.

Dalton was listed in the Domesday Book of 1086. This tax-motivated survey commissioned by William the Conqueror listed landholdings and resources. However, unlike other areas surrounding Huddersfield, Dalton was not listed as `waste', meaning uncultivated or unusable land, and there was economic activity. A plough was being used and the land was worth ten shillings.

Dalton was formerly a township in the parish of Kirk-Heaton, in 1866 Dalton became a separate civil parish, on 1 April 1924 the parish was abolished and merged with Huddersfield. In 1921 the parish had a population of 9528.

== Sport ==
Currently, the Edgerton & Dalton Cricket Club play at the ground the end of Dalton Fold Road. They are in the Huddersfield Cricket League.

The Moldgreen Amateur Rugby League team play at the DRAM (Dalton, Rawthorpe And Moldgreen) Centre fields off Ridgeway in Dalton.

== See also ==
- Listed buildings in Huddersfield (Dalton Ward)
