= Tolson Museum =

Museum in Huddersfield, West Yorkshire, England

- Tolson Museum
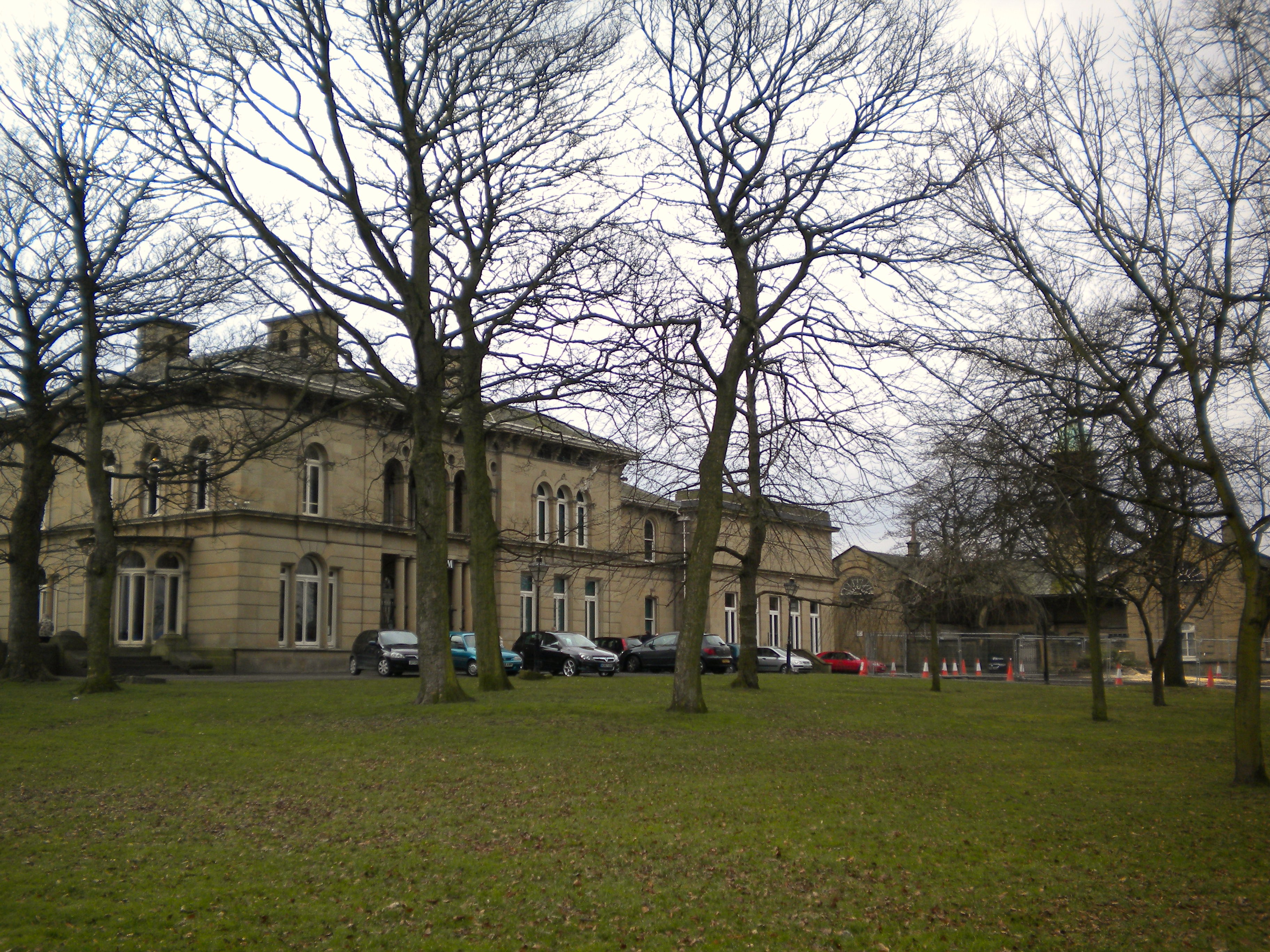
- Tolson Museum in Ravensknowle Park
- Location: Huddersfield
- Coordinates: 53.6449°N 1.7555°W
- Website: Tolson Museum

The Tolson Memorial Museum, also known as Tolson Museum, is housed in Ravensknowle Hall, a Victorian mansion in Ravensknowle Park on Wakefield Road in Huddersfield, West Yorkshire, England. The museum was given to the town by Legh Tolson in memory of his two nephews who were killed in the First World War. Originally a natural history museum, it is run by Kirklees Council and has a wide range of exhibits related to the area's cultural and industrial history.

== History ==
Ravensknowle Hall was built in the late-1850s for a local textile baron, John Beaumont. The house was designed by the London architect Richard Tress, who designed the mansion in a "palatial Italian style" and cost about £20,000. Beaumont died in 1889, leaving the house to his daughter, who sold it to a relative, Legh Tolson.

In 1919 Legh Tolson gave Ravensknowle Hall to Huddersfield Corporation to use as a museum in memory of his two nephews, brothers 2nd Lieutenant Robert Huntriss Tolson, killed on 1 July 1916 at the Battle of the Somme, and 2nd Lieutenant James Martin Tolson who died in the closing stages of the First World War on 2 October 1918. Their sisters were the suffragettes Catherine Tolson and Helen Tolson.

Originally a natural history museum with an extensive collection of rocks and fossils, the museum was formally opened on 27 May 1922 under the directorship of Thomas William Woodhead, a prominent local plant ecologist and professor of biology at Huddersfield Technical College, with Seth Lister Mosley being appointed the museum's first curator. His son, Charles Mosley, was appointed as Assistant Curator before succeeding his father in 1925. Charles remained curator until 1933.

The Tolson Museum was revamped in the 1980s to feature the industrial history of the Huddersfield area, including the manufacturing of textiles and road vehicles.

== Exhibits ==
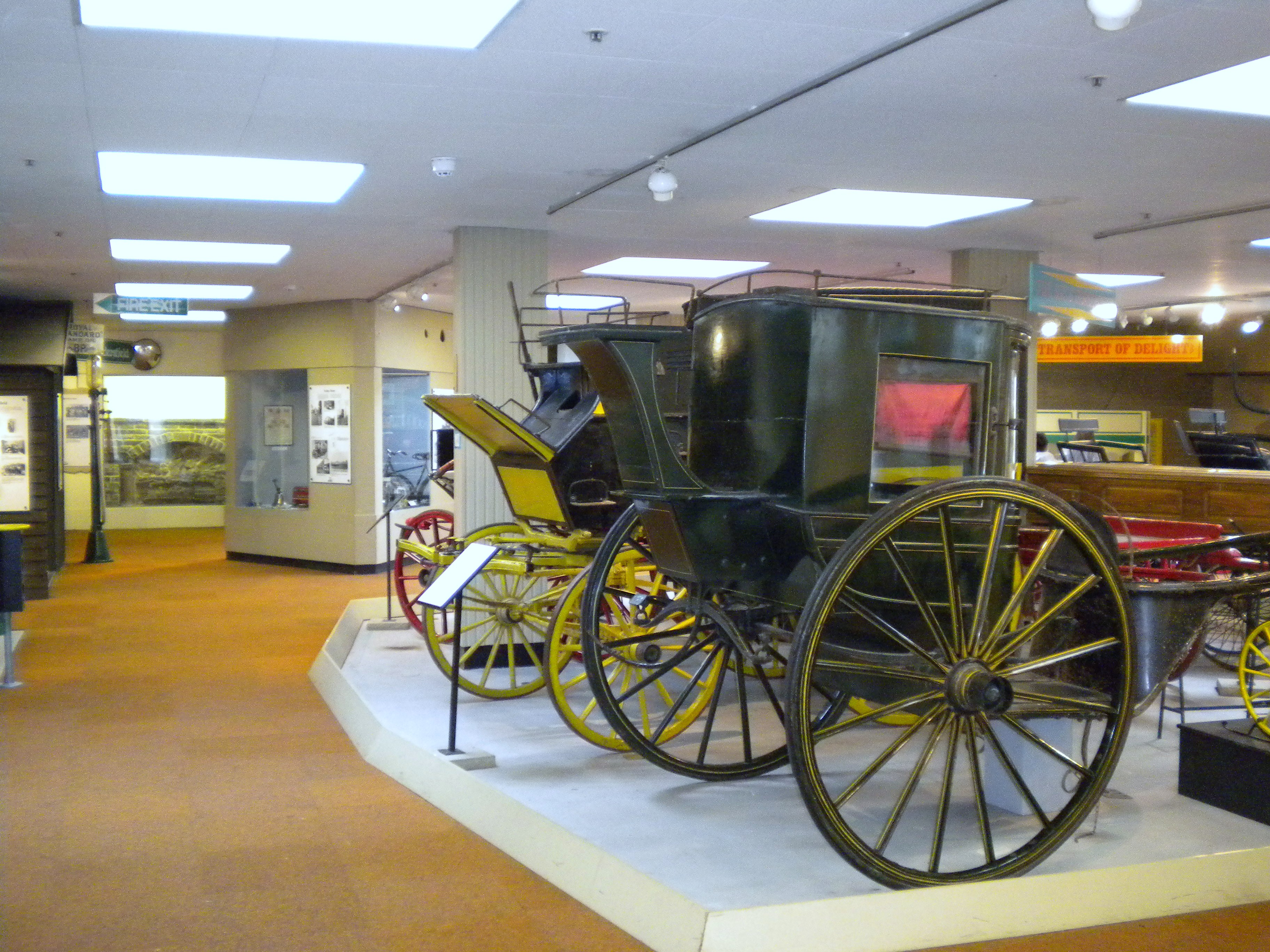
The transport gallery

Exhibits of local archaeology, weaving machinery and textiles, and natural history with an extensive collection of stuffed birds occupy the museum galleries. A reconstruction of a Victorian schoolroom allows children to experience the type of teaching used in that era. A ground floor extension at the rear of the building houses a transport exhibition including roadbuilding techniques and horsedrawn and motor vehicles including Britain's rarest car – the three-wheeled LSD – which was manufactured in Huddersfield between 1919 and 1924. It was made by Sykes and Sugden Ltd from 1919 to 1923 and then by the LSD Motor Company in Mirfield from 1923 to 1924. Another local make of car, the Valveless, made by David Brown Ltd., is on display after being recovered from South Africa.

The Grade II listed remains of a hypocaust, comprising the rubble columns and tiled floor from Slack Roman Fort were moved and reconstructed in Ravensknowle Park.

== See also ==
- Listed buildings in Almondbury
