= Slack Roman Fort =

- Location within West Yorkshire

General information
- Architectural style: Roman fort
- Location: Outlane; Huddersfield; West Yorkshire, England
- Coordinates: 53.654°N 1.872°W
- Completed: AD 79

Slack Roman Fort was a castellum near Outlane, to the west of Huddersfield in West Yorkshire, England. Its site is a scheduled monument. The ruins of the fort which lay alongside the Pennine section of the Roman road from Deva Victrix (Chester) to Eboracum (York) are no longer visible. The fort may have been the Cambodunum mentioned as a station on this route in the Antonine Itinerary.

Archaeological digs indicate the fort was constructed of turf and wood to defend the Roman road in the time of Agricola in AD 79. Outside the fort walls was a stone bath-house which was extended around AD 104 and AD 120. A vicus or small settlement of wooden huts grew outside the fort.

In December 2016, a retired professor from Bangor University, Peter Field, hypothesised that the fort's site was a potential location for the mythical Camelot.

== Location ==
The site of the fort is on gently sloping ground sheltered by a hill rising to 1,200 feet (366 m) above sea level about 4 miles (6 km) from Huddersfield, mostly to the south of the present-day M62 motorway. Observation posts on the surrounding hills commanded views towards Blackstone Edge, Standedge, Huddersfield and the Stainland Valley in the Halifax direction.

== Excavations ==
In 1743 the foundations of a temple were uncovered "with many beautiful ornamented bricks, and an altar, having a patera at the summit, on one side a cornucopia, and an original staff on the other. The edifice had been dedicated to the goddess Fortune, by one Antonius Modestus or Modestinus, of the sixth conquering legion".

The Huddersfield Archaeological and Topographical Society, whose secretary was George Lloyd, excavated the site in 1865. It excavated the remains of a residence measuring 60 feet (18 m) by 68 feet (21 m) with a courtyard. Nearby was a cremation site and on the slope 80 yards (73 m) below the house are the remains of a hypocaust for the hot air bath. Also found nearby were a British stone axe, pottery, part of a brooch and a quantity of galena, (lead ore). A druidic 'rocking stone' was found with these on Golcar Hill. On another part of the site are the remains of a cold bath comprised a slab of concrete 13 feet 6 inches (4.1 m) long by 6 feet 3 inches (1.9 m) wide. The room it was in had a red tiled floor. Copper or bronze coins from the reigns of Vespasian and Nerva, an earthenware jar and a tile stamped "COH IIII BRE" were also uncovered.

Excavations between 1913 and 1915 and 1958 to 1963 uncovered the fort's ramparts and the foundations of its gateways and corner towers. The ramparts, constructed of turves on a stone footing, surrounded an area 356 feet (111 metres) square. They were surrounded by a ditch, in some parts a double ditch when the fort was built in about AD 79. Inside are the outlines of several wooden buildings including the military headquarters and barrack blocks. Another phase of development about 20 years later added two granaries roofed with tiles stamped COHIIIIBRE, the mark of the 4th cohort of Breuci who operated a tilery in the nearby Grimescar Valley. A phase of building in stone began in the early AD 120s. but by then the garrison had been reduced. The fort was occupied until about AD 140.

Outside the fort to the east was the bath-house and to the north was a small civilian settlement which may have continued until AD 200.

The Tolson Museum in Huddersfield has a collection of artefacts including the reconstructed Grade II listed remains of the hypocaust, comprising the rubble columns and tiled floor, that were moved to Ravensknowle Park from the fort.
