= List of United Kingdom locations: Lol-Lov =

The United Kingdom

This is part of the list of United Kingdom locations: a gazetteer of place names in the United Kingdom showing each place's locality and geographical coordinates.

== Lo (continued) ==
=== Lol–Lon ===
Location	Locality	Coordinates (links to map & photo sources)	OS grid reference
Lolworth	Cambridgeshire	52.25°N 00.01°W	TL3664
Lomeshaye	Lancashire	53.82°N 02.24°W	SD8437
Lôn	Gwynedd	52.86°N 03.66°W	SH8831
Lonbain	Highland	57.50°N 05.87°W	NG6853
Londesborough	East Riding of Yorkshire	53.89°N 00.69°W	SE8645
London	City of Westminster	51.51°N 00.11°W	TQ3181
London Apprentice	Cornwall	50.31°N 04.81°W	SX0050
London Beach	Kent	51.09°N 00.68°E	TQ8836
London Colney	Hertfordshire	51.72°N 00.30°W	TL1704
Londonderry	North Yorkshire	54.27°N 01.54°W	SE3087
Londonderry	Sandwell	52.48°N 02.00°W	SP0087
London End	Cambridgeshire	52.29°N 00.40°W	TL0968
London Fields	Dudley	52.50°N 02.11°W	SO9290
London Minstead	Hampshire	50.89°N 01.60°W	SU2811
Londonthorpe	Lincolnshire	52.92°N 00.58°W	SK9537
Londubh	Highland	57.76°N 05.60°W	NG8681
Lonemore (Sutherland)	Highland	57.86°N 04.09°W	NH7688
Lonemore (Wester Ross)	Highland	57.72°N 05.73°W	NG7877
Longa Island	Highland	57.72°N 05.79°W	NG739774
Long Ashton	North Somerset	51.42°N 02.66°W	ST5470
Longay	Highland	57.30°N 05.89°W	NG657310
Long Bank	Worcestershire	52.36°N 02.35°W	SO7674
Longbar	North Ayrshire	55.73°N 04.67°W	NS3252
Longbarn	Cheshire	53.40°N 02.55°W	SJ6390
Long Bennington	Lincolnshire	52.98°N 00.76°W	SK8344
Longbenton	Newcastle upon Tyne	55.00°N 01.59°W	NZ2668
Longborough	Gloucestershire	51.95°N 01.75°W	SP1729
Long Bredy	Dorset	50.70°N 02.62°W	SY5690
Longbridge	Birmingham	52.39°N 01.98°W	SP0177
Longbridge	Devon	50.39°N 04.09°W	SX5157
Longbridge	Warwickshire	52.25°N 01.62°W	SP2662
Longbridge Deverill	Wiltshire	51.15°N 02.20°W	ST8640
Longbridge Hayes	Staffordshire	53.04°N 02.22°W	SJ8550
Long Buckby	Northamptonshire	52.29°N 01.09°W	SP6267
Long Buckby Wharf	Northamptonshire	52.28°N 01.10°W	SP6165
Longburgh	Cumbria	54.91°N 03.07°W	NY3158
Longburton	Dorset	50.90°N 02.51°W	ST6412
Longcause	Devon	50.43°N 03.70°W	SX7961
Long Clawson	Leicestershire	52.83°N 00.93°W	SK7227
Longcliffe	Derbyshire	53.09°N 01.67°W	SK2255
Longcombe	Devon	50.41°N 03.64°W	SX8359
Long Common	Hampshire	50.92°N 01.28°W	SU5014
Long Compton	Staffordshire	52.79°N 02.22°W	SJ8522
Long Compton	Warwickshire	51.98°N 01.59°W	SP2832
Longcot	Oxfordshire	51.60°N 01.61°W	SU2790
Long Crendon	Buckinghamshire	51.76°N 01.00°W	SP6908
Long Crichel	Dorset	50.88°N 02.04°W	ST9710
Longcroft	Cumbria	54.91°N 03.23°W	NY2158
Longcroft	Falkirk	55.98°N 03.94°W	NS7979
Long Cross	Wiltshire	51.08°N 02.31°W	ST7832
Longcross	Devon	50.58°N 04.21°W	SX4379
Longcross	Surrey	51.37°N 00.59°W	SU9865
Longdale	Cumbria	54.43°N 02.55°W	NY6405
Longdales	Cumbria	54.78°N 02.76°W	NY5144
Long Dean	Wiltshire	51.47°N 02.21°W	ST8575
Longden	Shropshire	52.64°N 02.82°W	SJ4406
Longden Common	Shropshire	52.63°N 02.84°W	SJ4304
Long Ditton	Surrey	51.38°N 00.33°W	TQ1666
Longdon	Staffordshire	52.72°N 01.88°W	SK0814
Longdon	Worcestershire	52.02°N 02.24°W	SO8336
Longdon Green	Staffordshire	52.71°N 01.88°W	SK0813
Longdon Heath	Worcestershire	52.04°N 02.23°W	SO8438
Longdon Hill End	Worcestershire	52.04°N 02.26°W	SO8238
Longdon-on-Tern	Shropshire	52.73°N 02.56°W	SJ6215
Longdown	Devon	50.70°N 03.61°W	SX8691
Longdowns	Cornwall	50.16°N 05.16°W	SW7434
Long Drax	North Yorkshire	53.74°N 00.97°W	SE6828
Long Duckmanton	Derbyshire	53.23°N 01.34°W	SK4471
Long Eaton	Derbyshire	52.89°N 01.27°W	SK4933
Longfield	Kent	51.39°N 00.29°E	TQ6069
Longfield	Shetland Islands	59.92°N 01.32°W	HU3816
Longfield	Wiltshire	51.31°N 02.21°W	ST8557
Longfield Hill	Kent	51.38°N 00.32°E	TQ6268
Longfleet	Poole	50.71°N 01.98°W	SZ0191
Longford	Cheshire	53.40°N 02.60°W	SJ6090
Longford	Coventry	52.44°N 01.50°W	SP3483
Longford	Derbyshire	52.93°N 01.68°W	SK2137
Longford	Gloucestershire	51.87°N 02.24°W	SO8320
Longford	Hillingdon	51.47°N 00.50°W	TQ0476
Longford	Kent	51.29°N 00.16°E	TQ5157
Longford (Market Drayton)	Shropshire	52.89°N 02.53°W	SJ6433
Longford (Newport)	Shropshire	52.75°N 02.41°W	SJ7218
Longfordlane	Derbyshire	52.92°N 01.67°W	SK2236
Longforgan	Perth and Kinross	56.45°N 03.12°W	NO3130
Longformacus	Scottish Borders	55.80°N 02.49°W	NT6957
Longframlington	Northumberland	55.29°N 01.79°W	NU1300
Long Gardens	Essex	51.99°N 00.67°E	TL8436
Long Green	Cheshire	53.22°N 02.79°W	SJ4770
Long Green	Suffolk	52.35°N 01.03°E	TM0777
Long Green	Worcestershire	51.99°N 02.23°W	SO8433
Longham	Dorset	50.78°N 01.91°W	SZ0698
Longham	Norfolk	52.69°N 00.86°E	TF9415
Long Hanborough	Oxfordshire	51.82°N 01.40°W	SP4114
Longhaven	Aberdeenshire	57.44°N 01.83°W	NK1039
Longhedge	Wiltshire	51.19°N 02.25°W	ST8244
Longhirst	Northumberland	55.19°N 01.65°W	NZ2289
Longhope	Gloucestershire	51.85°N 02.46°W	SO6818
Longhope	Orkney Islands	58.79°N 03.21°W	ND3090
Longhorsley	Northumberland	55.24°N 01.78°W	NZ1494
Longhoughton	Northumberland	55.42°N 01.62°W	NU2415
Longhouse	Bath and North East Somerset	51.33°N 02.43°W	ST7060
Long Itchington	Warwickshire	52.28°N 01.40°W	SP4165
Long John's Hill	Norfolk	52.60°N 01.29°E	TG2306
Longlands	Bexley	51.4302°N 0.0854°E	TQ449722
Longlands	Cumbria	54.70°N 03.15°W	NY2635
Longlane	Berkshire	51.43°N 01.28°W	SU5071
Longlane	Derbyshire	52.93°N 01.62°W	SK2538
Long Lane	Shropshire	52.73°N 02.54°W	SJ6315
Long Lawford	Warwickshire	52.38°N 01.31°W	SP4776
Long Lee	Bradford	53.85°N 01.89°W	SE0740
Longlevens	Gloucestershire	51.87°N 02.21°W	SO8520
Longley	Calderdale	53.68°N 01.92°W	SE0521
Longley (Holme Valley)	Kirklees	53.55°N 01.79°W	SE1406
Longley (near Huddersfield)	Kirklees	53.631°N 01.769°W	SE1514
Longley Estate	Sheffield	53.41°N 01.47°W	SK3591
Longley Green	Worcestershire	52.14°N 02.39°W	SO7350
Long Load	Somerset	51.00°N 02.77°W	ST4623
Longmanhill	Aberdeenshire	57.64°N 02.45°W	NJ7362
Long Marston	Hertfordshire	51.82°N 00.70°W	SP8915
Long Marston	North Yorkshire	53.95°N 01.23°W	SE5051
Long Marston	Warwickshire	52.13°N 01.78°W	SP1548
Long Marton	Cumbria	54.61°N 02.52°W	NY6624
Long Meadow	Cambridgeshire	52.23°N 00.25°E	TL5462
Long Meadowend	Shropshire	52.43°N 02.86°W	SO4182
Long Melford	Suffolk	52.07°N 00.71°E	TL8645
Longmoss	Cheshire	53.26°N 02.18°W	SJ8874
Long Newnton	Gloucestershire	51.62°N 02.14°W	ST9092
Longnewton	Stockton-on-Tees	54.53°N 01.41°W	NZ3816
Longney	Gloucestershire	51.80°N 02.34°W	SO7612
Longniddry	East Lothian	55.97°N 02.89°W	NT4476
Longnor	Shropshire	52.59°N 02.75°W	SJ4900
Longnor (Peak District)	Staffordshire	53.17°N 01.88°W	SK0864
Longnor (South Staffs)	Staffordshire	52.72°N 02.20°W	SJ8614
Longnor Park	Shropshire	52.59°N 02.79°W	SJ4600
Long Oak	Shropshire	52.80°N 02.96°W	SJ3523
Longparish	Hampshire	51.19°N 01.38°W	SU4344
Long Park	Hampshire	51.09°N 01.37°W	SU4433
Longpark	Cumbria	54.94°N 02.89°W	NY4362
Longpark	East Ayrshire	55.61°N 04.51°W	NS4239
Longport	Staffordshire	53.03°N 02.22°W	SJ8549
Long Preston	North Yorkshire	54.01°N 02.26°W	SD8358
Longridge	Gloucestershire	51.77°N 02.17°W	SO8809
Longridge	Lancashire	53.82°N 02.60°W	SD6037
Longridge	Staffordshire	52.73°N 02.13°W	SJ9115
Longridge	West Lothian	55.84°N 03.67°W	NS9562
Longridge End	Gloucestershire	51.91°N 02.27°W	SO8124
Longrigg	North Lanarkshire	55.90°N 03.87°W	NS8370
Longriggend	North Lanarkshire	55.90°N 03.88°W	NS8270
Long Riston	East Riding of Yorkshire	53.86°N 00.29°W	TA1242
Longrock	Cornwall	50.12°N 05.51°W	SW4931
Long Sandall	Doncaster	53.54°N 01.09°W	SE6006
Longscales	North Yorkshire	54.00°N 01.66°W	SE2257
Longsdon	Staffordshire	53.08°N 02.06°W	SJ9654
Longshaw	Wigan	53.51°N 02.72°W	SD5202
Longshaw	Staffordshire	53.00°N 01.91°W	SK0645
Longside	Aberdeenshire	57.51°N 01.95°W	NK0347
Longsight	Manchester	53.46°N 02.21°W	SJ8696
Long Sight	Oldham	53.55°N 02.12°W	SD9206
Longslow	Shropshire	52.91°N 02.52°W	SJ6535
Longsowerby	Cumbria	54.87°N 02.95°W	NY3954
Longstanton	Cambridgeshire	52.27°N 00.03°E	TL3966
Longstock	Hampshire	51.13°N 01.50°W	SU3537
Longstone (St Ives)	Cornwall	50.19°N 05.46°W	SW5338
Longstone (St Mabyn)	Cornwall	50.52°N 04.73°W	SX0673
Longstone	City of Edinburgh	55.91°N 03.26°W	NT2170
Longstone	Northumberland	55.64°N 01.61°W	NU243391
Longstone	Somerset	51.05°N 02.87°W	ST3929
Longstowe	Cambridgeshire	52.17°N 00.09°W	TL3055
Long Stratton	Norfolk	52.48°N 01.22°E	TM1992
Long Street	Milton Keynes	52.11°N 00.84°W	SP7947
Longstreet	Wiltshire	51.25°N 01.80°W	SU1451
Long Sutton	Hampshire	51.21°N 00.95°W	SU7347
Long Sutton	Lincolnshire	52.77°N 00.11°E	TF4322
Long Sutton	Somerset	51.02°N 02.77°W	ST4625
Longthorpe	Cambridgeshire	52.56°N 00.28°W	TL1698
Long Thurlow	Suffolk	52.27°N 00.94°E	TM0168
Longthwaite	Cumbria	54.59°N 02.88°W	NY4322
Longton	Lancashire	53.71°N 02.80°W	SD4725
Longton	City of Stoke-on-Trent	52.98°N 02.15°W	SJ9043
Longtown	Cumbria	55.00°N 02.97°W	NY3868
Longtown	Herefordshire	51.94°N 02.99°W	SO3228
Longview	Knowsley	53.42°N 02.84°W	SJ4492
Longville in the Dale	Shropshire	52.53°N 02.69°W	SO5393
Longway Bank	Derbyshire	53.08°N 01.53°W	SK3154
Longwell Green	South Gloucestershire	51.43°N 02.50°W	ST6571
Long Whatton	Leicestershire	52.80°N 01.28°W	SK4823
Longwick	Buckinghamshire	51.73°N 00.87°W	SP7805
Long Wittenham	Oxfordshire	51.63°N 01.22°W	SU5493
Longwitton	Northumberland	55.18°N 01.89°W	NZ0788
Longwood	Kirklees	53.64°N 01.85°W	SE1016
Longwood Edge	Kirklees	53.64°N 01.85°W	SE1017
Longworth	Oxfordshire	51.68°N 01.43°W	SU3999
Lon-las	Swansea	51.65°N 03.88°W	SS7097
Lonmay	Aberdeenshire	57.61°N 01.98°W	NK0158
Lonmore	Highland	57.42°N 06.56°W	NG2646

=== Loo–Lov ===
Location	Locality	Coordinates (links to map & photo sources)	OS grid reference
Looe	Cornwall	50.35°N 04.46°W	SX2553
Looe Mills	Cornwall	50.44°N 04.49°W	SX2364
Loose	Kent	51.24°N 00.52°E	TQ7652
Loosegate	Lincolnshire	52.80°N 00.05°W	TF3125
Loose Hill	Kent	51.24°N 00.50°E	TQ7552
Loosley Row	Buckinghamshire	51.69°N 00.82°W	SP8100
Lopen	Somerset	50.92°N 02.82°W	ST4214
Lopen Head	Somerset	50.92°N 02.82°W	ST4214
Loppergarth	Cumbria	54.18°N 03.15°W	SD2577
Loppington	Shropshire	52.85°N 02.78°W	SJ4729
Lopwell	Devon	50.45°N 04.15°W	SX4764
Lordsbridge	Norfolk	52.68°N 00.32°E	TF5712
Lord's Hill	City of Southampton	50.93°N 01.46°W	SU3815
Lordshill Common	Surrey	51.17°N 00.54°W	TQ0243
Lordswood	City of Southampton	50.93°N 01.43°W	SU4015
Lords Wood	Kent	51.32°N 00.53°E	TQ7762
Loscoe	Derbyshire	53.01°N 01.37°W	SK4247
Loscoe	Wakefield	53.70°N 01.39°W	SE4023
Loscombe	Dorset	50.77°N 02.71°W	SY5097
Losgaintir	Western Isles	57.88°N 06.96°W	NG0699
Lossiemouth	Moray	57.71°N 03.29°W	NJ2370
Lostford	Shropshire	52.87°N 02.56°W	SJ6231
Lostock	Bolton	53.56°N 02.51°W	SD6608
Lostock Gralam	Cheshire	53.27°N 02.46°W	SJ6975
Lostock Green	Cheshire	53.25°N 02.46°W	SJ6973
Lostock Hall	Lancashire	53.71°N 02.69°W	SD5425
Lostock Junction	Bolton	53.56°N 02.49°W	SD6708
Lostwithiel	Cornwall	50.40°N 04.67°W	SX1059
Lothbeg	Highland	58.06°N 03.79°W	NC9410
Lothersdale	North Yorkshire	53.90°N 02.06°W	SD9645
Lothianbridge	Midlothian	55.86°N 03.08°W	NT3264
Lothmore	Highland	58.07°N 03.76°W	NC9611
Lottisham	Somerset	51.10°N 02.61°W	ST5734
Loudwater	Buckinghamshire	51.60°N 00.70°W	SU9090
Loudwater	Hertfordshire	51.65°N 00.48°W	TQ0596
Loughborough	Leicestershire	52.76°N 01.21°W	SK5319
Loughor	Swansea	51.66°N 04.06°W	SS5798
Loughton	Essex	51.64°N 00.06°E	TQ4396
Loughton	Milton Keynes	52.02°N 00.79°W	SP8337
Loughton	Shropshire	52.44°N 02.57°W	SO6183
Lound	Nottinghamshire	53.36°N 00.96°W	SK6986
Lound	Suffolk	52.52°N 01.68°E	TM5098
Loundsley Green	Derbyshire	53.24°N 01.47°W	SK3572
Lount	Leicestershire	52.76°N 01.43°W	SK3819
Louth	Lincolnshire	53.36°N -00.00°E	TF3387
Lovaton	Devon	50.47°N 04.05°W	SX5466
Loveclough	Lancashire	53.73°N 02.28°W	SD8127
Lovedean	Hampshire	50.90°N 01.03°W	SU6812
Love Green	Buckinghamshire	51.51°N 00.51°W	TQ0381
Lover	Wiltshire	50.97°N 01.70°W	SU2120
Loversall	Doncaster	53.47°N 01.14°W	SK5798
Loves Green	Essex	51.71°N 00.37°E	TL6404
Loveston	Pembrokeshire	51.73°N 04.78°W	SN0808
Lovington	Somerset	51.06°N 02.58°W	ST5930
