= Longstone =

Longstone or Long Stone may refer to

== Places ==
- Longstone, Edinburgh, a suburb of Edinburgh, Scotland
- Longstone, County Armagh, a townland in County Armagh, Northern Ireland
- Longstone, Cornwall, a hamlet in Cornwall, England
- Longstone, Isles of Scilly, a place in the Isles of Scilly, Cornwall, England
- Longstone, Somerset, a location in England
- Longstone, St Ives, a location in Cornwall, England
- Great Longstone and Little Longstone, two villages in Derbyshire, England
- Longstone Lighthouse, a lighthouse on Longstone Rock, Farne Islands, Northumberland, England

=== Prehistoric ===
- The Longstone, Mottistone, a standing stone on the Isle of Wight, England
- The Longstones, two standing stones near Beckhampton, Wiltshire, England
- Longstone Rath, a prehistoric ringfort with a standing stone near Cullen, Co. Tipperary, Ireland
- Boswens Menhir, Cornwall, England, also known as the Long Stone
- The Long Stone, a standing stone on Shovel Down, Dartmoor, England

== Other ==
- Longstone (band), an experimental, electronic music collective formed in Cheltenham, England
- Longstone GAC, a Gaelic Football club from Co. Down, Northern Ireland
