= Longley =

Longley may refer to:

== Places ==
- Longley, Calderdale, a location in West Yorkshire, England
- Longley, Holme Valley, a location in Kirklees, West Yorkshire, England
- Longley, Huddersfield, Kirklees, West Yorkshire, England
- Longley, Sheffield, South Yorkshire, England
- Longley, Tasmania, a locality in Australia
- Lower Longley, Tasmania

== People ==
- Longley (surname)

== See also ==
- Long Lee, near Keighley, West Yorkshire, England
- Longley Green, Worcestershire, England
