= Grade II* listed buildings in Kirklees =

There are over 20,000 Grade II* listed buildings in England. This page is a list of these buildings in the metropolitan borough of Kirklees in West Yorkshire.

== List ==
Name	Location	Type	Completed (Note: The date given is the date used by Historic England as significant for the initial building or that of an important part in the structure's description.)	Date designated	Grid ref. (Note: The grid reference is based on the British national grid reference system, sometimes known as OSGB36, used by the Ordnance Survey.) Geo-coordinates	Entry number (Note: The "List Entry Number" is a unique number assigned to each listed building and scheduled monument by Historic England.)	Image
Cruck Barn Adjoining and to North of Nether End Farmhouse	Nether End, Denby Dale, Kirklees	Cruck Barn	16th century or Early 17th century	15 August 1985	SE2465107863; 53°34′00″N 1°37′45″W	1135327	Upload Photo
Thorncliffe Grange Farmhouse	Emley, Denby Dale, Kirklees	House	Soon after 1623	29 March 1965	SE2500613441; 53°37′01″N 1°37′24″W	1299857	Upload Photo
Wheatley Hill Farmhouse	Denby Dale, Denby Dale, Kirklees	Farmhouse	16th century	29 March 1965	SE2526009795; 53°35′03″N 1°37′12″W	1299789	Wheatley Hill Farmhouse
33, 35, 37, 39 Totties Lane	Totties, Holme Valley, Kirklees	House	later alterations	4 August 1983	SE1571708227; 53°34′14″N 1°45′51″W	1228692	33, 35, 37, 39 Totties Lane
Church of St John Baptist	Kirkheaton, Kirkburton, Kirklees	Tower	Perpendicular	23 June 1965	SE1788517222; 53°39′04″N 1°43′51″W	1135391	Church of St John Baptist More images
Old Milestone	Farnley Moor End, Kirkburton, Kirklees	Sundial	1738	23 June 1965	SE1662711497; 53°35′59″N 1°45′01″W	1135350	Old Milestone More images
Shelley Hall	Shelley, Kirkburton, Kirklees	House	Post 1699	23 June 1965	SE2073411210; 53°35′49″N 1°41′17″W	1313319	Upload Photo
Healey House	Meltham, Kirklees	House	Late 18th century	6 April 1967	SE1061710751; 53°35′36″N 1°50′28″W	1183868	Upload Photo
Church of St Mary	Mirfield, Kirklees	Church	1871	14 March 1966	SE2114820413; 53°40′47″N 1°40′53″W	1134677	Church of St Mary More images
Hopton Congregational Church	Mirfield, Kirklees	School	1829	30 April 1982	SE2011319227; 53°40′09″N 1°41′49″W	1134675	Hopton Congregational Church More images
The Old Rectory	Mirfield, Kirklees	House	Early 16th century	14 March 1966	SE2098320253; 53°40′42″N 1°41′02″W	1300318	The Old Rectory More images
Arts Centre Including Dwarf Wall Enclosing Queens Square	Kirklees	Gate Pier	1819	11 June 1975	SE1464816538; 53°38′43″N 1°46′48″W	1231218	Arts Centre Including Dwarf Wall Enclosing Queens Square More images
Bagshaw Museum, the Woodlands	Wilton Park, Kirklees	House	1875	13 May 1998	SE2349425778; 53°43′40″N 1°38′43″W	1119738	Bagshaw Museum, the Woodlands More images
Banqueting House in Grounds of Batley Hall	Upper Batley, Kirklees	Banqueting House	17th century	13 January 1984	SE2431325437; 53°43′29″N 1°37′59″W	1313718	Upload Photo
Boiler House and Engine House and Rope Race and Water Tower and Powerhouse at Westwood Mills	Linthwaite, Kirklees	Boiler House	1826	20 June 2000	SE0950214572; 53°37′39″N 1°51′28″W	1271263	Upload Photo
Britannia Buildings	Kirklees	Commercial Office	1856	29 September 1978	SE1443116847; 53°38′53″N 1°46′59″W	1232119	Britannia Buildings More images
18th century Guide Stoop (signpost) at Junction of Crosland Road and Lindley Moor Road	Kirklees	Milestone	POST MEDIEVAL	9 August 2011	SE1072518979; 53°40′02″N 1°50′21″W	1403442	18th century Guide Stoop (signpost) at Junction of Crosland Road and Lindley Moor Road More images
Canal Warehouse at Aspley Basin	Kirklees	Winch	1774-80	12 September 1973	SE1493516457; 53°38′40″N 1°46′32″W	1223867	Canal Warehouse at Aspley Basin More images
Church of All Saints	Dewsbury, Kirklees	Dwelling	Anglo Saxon	30 June 1949	SE2459021524; 53°41′23″N 1°37′45″W	1134712	Church of All Saints More images
Church of St John	Bay Hall, Kirklees	Church	1851	3 March 1952	SE1410217729; 53°39′21″N 1°47′17″W	1217625	Church of St John More images
Church of St Matthew	Rastrick, Kirklees	Church	1875	3 January 1967	SE1385421578; 53°41′26″N 1°47′30″W	1183810	Church of St Matthew More images
Church of St Peter	Hartshead, Kirklees	Church	Norman	12 January 1967	SE1790023310; 53°42′21″N 1°43′49″W	1134588	Church of St Peter More images
Church of St Peter	Birstall, Kirklees	Church	c. 1100	29 March 1963	SE2185526179; 53°43′54″N 1°40′13″W	1134648	Church of St Peter More images
Church of St Thomas	Huddersfield, Kirklees	Church	1857-59	3 May 1952	SE1382916225; 53°38′32″N 1°47′32″W	1134950	Church of St Thomas More images
Church of the Holy Trinity	Highfield, Kirklees	Parish Church	1816-19	29 September 1978	SE1378117062; 53°39′00″N 1°47′35″W	1223128	Church of the Holy Trinity More images
Close Gate Bridge	Marsden, Kirklees	Packhorse Bridge	17th century or 18th century	25 May 1966	SE0287412100; 53°36′20″N 1°57′29″W	1276561	Close Gate Bridge More images
Crosland Hall	Crosland Moor, Kirklees	House	Early 17th century	3 March 1952	SE1104714310; 53°37′31″N 1°50′04″W	1134305	Crosland Hall
Dod Lea House	Longwood, Kirklees	House	1674	29 September 1978	SE1045117129; 53°39′02″N 1°50′36″W	1313538	Dod Lea House
Entrance Portal to Standedge Canal Tunnel	Marsden, Kirklees	Canal Tunnel	1797-1811	11 July 1985	SE0395911911; 53°36′13″N 1°56′30″W	1266901	Entrance Portal to Standedge Canal Tunnel
Fenny Hall	Almondbury, Kirklees	House	17th century or Early 18th century	3 March 1952	SE1774015206; 53°37′59″N 1°44′00″W	1134260	Fenny Hall More images
Highfield Farmhouse and Cottage	Birstall, Kirklees	Farmhouse	17th century	15 May 1980	SE2228326687; 53°44′10″N 1°39′49″W	1184038	Upload Photo
Huddersfield Technical College (administration and Business)	Highfield, Kirklees	Steps	1831	29 September 1978	SE1407916836; 53°38′52″N 1°47′19″W	1228645	Huddersfield Technical College (administration and Business) More images
Lindley Clock Tower	Lindley, Kirklees	Steps	1900-2	12 September 1973	SE1188018051; 53°39′32″N 1°49′18″W	1215049	Lindley Clock Tower More images
Linthwaite Hall	Slaithwaite, Kirklees	Apartment	c. 1600	25 May 1966	SE0849013878; 53°37′17″N 1°52′23″W	1216775	Linthwaite Hall
Lion Buildings	Kirklees	Statue	Modern	29 September 1978	SE1447316884; 53°38′54″N 1°46′57″W	1134167	Lion Buildings More images
Longley Old Hall	Kirklees	House	Medieval	3 March 1952	SE1542415015; 53°37′53″N 1°46′06″W	1288214	Longley Old Hall More images
Manor House	Slaithwaite, Kirklees	Manor House	Late 16th century	25 May 1966	SE0777513991; 53°37′21″N 1°53′02″W	1233457	Manor House More images
Manor House Peel House	Gomersal, Kirklees	Manor House	Mid-late 17th century	12 January 1967	SE2068426758; 53°44′12″N 1°41′16″W	1184378	Upload Photo
Mellor Bridge	Marsden, Kirklees	Packhorse Bridge	17th century or 18th century	25 May 1966	SE0470211679; 53°36′06″N 1°55′50″W	1275335	Mellor Bridge More images
Mile Pole Adjacent to Lower Royal George Public House	Pole Moor, Kirklees	Signpost	1755	11 July 1985	SE0696916307; 53°38′36″N 1°53′46″W	1221381	Mile Pole Adjacent to Lower Royal George Public House More images
Mill Dam at Westwood Mills	Linthwaite, Kirklees	Wall	1801	20 June 2000	SE0948214557; 53°37′39″N 1°51′29″W	1271264	Upload Photo
Milnsbridge House	Milnsbridge, Kirklees	House	Early 18th century	3 March 1952	SE1166616033; 53°38′26″N 1°49′30″W	1290158	Milnsbridge House More images
New House Hall	Sheepridge, Kirklees	House	1581-1638	3 March 1952	SE1551119754; 53°40′27″N 1°46′00″W	1279156	New House Hall
North Range at Westwood Mills	Linthwaite, Kirklees	Electricity Sub Station	C20	11 July 1985	SE0949914607; 53°37′40″N 1°51′28″W	1216965	Upload Photo
Offices and Workshop Range at Westwood Mills	Linthwaite, Kirklees	Electricity Sub Station	C20	11 July 1985	SE0950914593; 53°37′40″N 1°51′28″W	1217132	Upload Photo
Old Hall	Birstall, Kirklees	Detached House	1700	29 March 1963	SE2239026443; 53°44′02″N 1°39′43″W	1300342	Upload Photo
Old Hall Farmhouse	Roberttown, Kirklees	Farmhouse	17th century	12 January 1967	SE1985222984; 53°42′10″N 1°42′03″W	1135409	Old Hall Farmhouse More images
Old Hall Public House	Heckmondwike, Kirklees	House	17th century	11 June 1980	SE2140623931; 53°42′41″N 1°40′38″W	1300236	Old Hall Public House More images
Parish Church of St Peter	Kirklees	Parish Church	1834-36	3 March 1952	SE1457816771; 53°38′50″N 1°46′51″W	1134977	Parish Church of St Peter More images
Pollard Hall	Gomersal, Kirklees	House	1659	12 January 1967	SE2082226154; 53°43′53″N 1°41′09″W	1313297	Pollard Hall More images
Principal Mill Building at Folly Hall Mill	Kirklees	Textile Mill	Early 19th century	29 September 1978	SE1418015990; 53°38′25″N 1°47′13″W	1134242	Principal Mill Building at Folly Hall Mill More images
Providence Place United Reformed Church, Gate Piers and Gates	Cleckheaton, Kirklees	Gate	1857-9	30 April 1982	SE1907925707; 53°43′39″N 1°42′44″W	1184234	Providence Place United Reformed Church, Gate Piers and Gates More images
Red House	Kirklees	House	1660	12 January 1967	SE2078526259; 53°43′56″N 1°41′11″W	1135404	Upload Photo
Rose Hill	Kirklees	House	Late 19th century	29 September 1978	SE1310518098; 53°39′33″N 1°48′11″W	1134389	Rose Hill More images
The George Hotel	Kirklees	Hotel	1849-50	20 September 1977	SE1441816956; 53°38′56″N 1°47′00″W	1277386	The George Hotel More images
The Second Hall (to South West of Lees Hall)	Thornhill Lees, Kirklees	House	17th century	30 June 1949	SE2329619984; 53°40′33″N 1°38′56″W	1134698	Upload Photo
Thorpe Farm Barn	Almondbury, Kirklees	Barn	19th century	3 March 1952	SE1748215463; 53°38′07″N 1°44′14″W	1313840	Upload Photo
Upper Independent Chapel	Heckmondwike, Kirklees	Congregational Chapel	1890	7 June 1978	SE2224323716; 53°42′34″N 1°39′52″W	1134623	Upper Independent Chapel More images
Walton Cross 100 Yards North of Walton Cross Farmhouse	Hartshead, Kirklees	Cross	11th century	12 January 1967	SE1761423792; 53°42′37″N 1°44′05″W	1313305	Walton Cross 100 Yards North of Walton Cross Farmhouse More images
West Block at Westwood Mills	Linthwaite, Kirklees	Carding Mill	c. 1800	11 July 1985	SE0948914590; 53°37′40″N 1°51′29″W	1216966	Upload Photo
Wood End Farm	Slaithwaite, Kirklees	Farmhouse	1626	11 July 1985	SE0813814914; 53°37′50″N 1°52′42″W	1233729	Wood End Farm
Wormalls Hall	Almondbury, Kirklees	House	16th century	3 March 1952	SE1685315006; 53°37′53″N 1°44′48″W	1224854	Wormalls Hall More images
12–20 St Georges Square	Kirklees	House	Mid 19th century	11 February 1977	SE1432316790; 53°38′51″N 1°47′05″W	1232139	Upload Photo
7 St Georges Square	Kirklees	House	Mid 19th century	29 September 1978	SE1438716843; 53°38′52″N 1°47′02″W	1231781	7 St Georges Square More images
42–46 Townend	Almondbury, Kirklees	House	17th century	29 September 1978	SE1654715524; 53°38′10″N 1°45′04″W	1239763	Upload Photo
2–6 Railway Street	Kirklees	House	Mid 19th century	11 February 1977	SE1434616762; 53°38′50″N 1°47′04″W	1278114	2–6 Railway Street
8 and 10 Railway Street	Kirklees	House	Mid 19th century	11 February 1977	SE1434316790; 53°38′51″N 1°47′04″W	1231473	8 and 10 Railway Street More images
59 Quarmby Fold	Kirklees	House	16th century	3 March 1952	SE1141117258; 53°39′06″N 1°49′44″W	1230100	59 Quarmby Fold
47 and 49 Quarmby Fold	Kirklees	House	16th century	3 March 1952	SE1140117255; 53°39′06″N 1°49′44″W	1278771	47 and 49 Quarmby Fold More images
