= Longcroft =

Longcroft may refer to:

== Places ==
- Longcroft, Cumbria, England
- Longcroft, Falkirk, Scotland

== People with the surname ==
- Charles Longcroft, (1883–1958), RAF officer
- Okeover Longcroft, (1850–1871), English cricketer

== Other uses ==
- Longcroft School, England

== See also ==
- Long Croft, a historic building in North Yorkshire, in England
