= Springwood =

Springwood may refer to:

== Australia ==
- Springwood, New South Wales, a suburb in the Blue Mountains, west of Sydney
- Springwood, Queensland, a suburb of Logan City, south of Brisbane
- Electoral district of Springwood, Queensland

== United Kingdom ==
- Springwood, Huddersfield, West Yorkshire, England

== United States ==
- Springwood Estate at the Home of Franklin D. Roosevelt National Historic Site
- Springwood, Torrance, California, a gated neighborhood located on the western branch of Plaza del Amo in Torrance, California

== Fictional locations ==
- Springwood, Ohio, a fictional town that is home to Freddy Krueger in the Nightmare on Elm Street films
- A fictional town in Alone in the Dark, 1982 film

== See also ==
- Spring wood
