= Lungley =

Lungley is a surname. Notable people with the surname include:

- Alfred Lungley (1905–1989), British soldier
- Tom Lungley (born 1979), British cricketer and umpire

== See also ==
- Langley (surname)
- Longley (surname)
