= Listed buildings in Huddersfield (Newsome Ward – outer areas) =

Newsome is a ward of Huddersfield in the metropolitan borough of Kirklees, West Yorkshire, England. It contains over 430 listed buildings that are recorded in the National Heritage List for England. Of these, one is listed at Grade I, the highest of the three grades, 16 are at Grade II*, the middle grade, and the others are at Grade II, the lowest grade. The ward is large, and contains the centre of the town of Huddersfield, and areas to the west and south. This list contains the listed buildings outside the centre of the town, namely those outside the ring road, and include the areas of Almondbury, Armitage Bridge, Aspley, Highfields, Lockwood, Longley, Lowerhouses, Moldgreen, Newsome, Rashcliffe, Springwood, and Taylor Hill. The listed buildings in the central area within the ring road are at Listed buildings in Huddersfield (Newsome Ward - central area)

To the south of the town the Huddersfield Broad Canal joins the Huddersfield Narrow Canal, and the listed buildings associated with them are a canal basin, a warehouse, locks, and a bridge. The area to the west of the town is mainly residential, immediately to the south of the town is an area involved with the textile industry, and further to the south are villages and smaller settlements, and the surrounding countryside.

Most of the listed buildings in the area to the west of the town centre are houses and associated structures, and the others include churches and related items, and a former infirmary with a statue in the forecourt. The textile area includes mills, shops, public houses, and portals to railway tunnels. Further to the south, most of the listed buildings are houses and cottages, farmhouses and farm buildings, former textile mills, churches and associated structures, a road bridge, a railway viaduct, a former spa baths and an associated hotel.

== Key ==
Grade	Criteria
I	Buildings of exceptional interest, sometimes considered to be internationally important
II*	Particularly important buildings of more than special interest
II	Buildings of national importance and special interest

== Buildings ==
Name and location	Photograph	Date	Notes	Grade
Outbuilding, garage, and barn, Ashes Common Farm; 53.62724°N 1.76719°W	—	17th century	The oldest part is cruck framed with stone walls, two bays, and a cellar. North of this is an extension dating from the 18th century with two storeys, containing modern garage doors and mullioned windows. West of these is a barn dating from the 18th century or earlier.	II
Longley Old Hall; 53.63146°N 1.76823°W	—	17th century	The house, which was restored in 1884–85, is in stone with a hipped stone slate roof. There are two storeys, four gables with kneelers and ball finials at the front and three at the rear. The doorway has a depressed arch, and the windows are mullioned, those in the ground floor with hood moulds.	II*
Cold Hill; 53.61968°N 1.78209°W		1708	A row of stone houses with a stone slate roof. There are two storeys, a two-storey north wing, and a lean-to outshut. The windows are mullioned, and one house has a dated and initialled lintel. To the northwest is a barn.	II
150 and 152 Ashes Lane, Almondbury; 53.62830°N 1.76580°W	—	18th century	A pair of mirror image houses, they are rendered with a stone slate roof. There are two storeys, and each house has two bays. The windows are mullioned, and each house has a two-light and a three-light window in the upper floor and a four-light window in the ground floor. On the front is an inscribed plaque.	II
62 Kaye Lane and barn, Almondbury; 53.62921°N 1.75914°W	—	18th century	A house with a barn to the east, they are in stone, the barn rendered, with a stone slate roof. There are two storeys and a rear lean-to outshut. The house contains mullioned windows, and in the barn are doors and two loft windows.	II
112 Kaye Lane, Almondbury; 53.62878°N 1.76270°W	—	18th century	A stone house with a hipped stone slate roof and two storeys. The windows are a mix of casements and mullioned windows.	II
27 and 29 Elmwood Avenue, Highfields; 53.65079°N 1.78830°W	—	18th century (or earlier)	The houses have a rendered front with quoins, the sides are in brick, and the roof is in stone slate with a coped gable flanked by parapets. There are two storeys and an attic, and a front of six bays. On the front are two doorways with moulded surrounds and fanlights, the windows are sashes with moulded surrounds, and in the attic is a Venetian window with the centre light blocked. On the sides are mullioned windows.	II
7 and 9 Greenhead Road, Highfields; 53.64691°N 1.78913°W	—	18th century (probable)	A pair of mirror image houses that have a stone slate roof with a coped gable. There are two storeys and each house has two bays. In the upper floor are two casement windows and two sash windows, and the lower floor contains one casement window and a two-light mullioned sash window.	II
151–155 Longley; 53.63202°N 1.76793°W	—	18th century	A row of three stone houses with a stone slate roof and two storeys. The windows in No. 155 are modern casements, and in the other houses they are mullioned, with some lights blocked, and include a ten-light window in the upper floor of No. 151.	II
161 and 165 Longley; 53.63174°N 1.76790°W	—	18th century	A pair of stone houses with a stone slate roof and two storeys. The windows are mullioned, and some lights are blocked.	II
167 and 169 Longley; 53.63197°N 1.76811°W	—	18th century	A pair of stone houses with a stone slate roof and two storeys. The windows are mullioned, and some lights are blocked.	II
175–179 Longley; 53.63146°N 1.76783°W	—	18th century	A row of stone houses with a stone slate roof, hipped at the west end. There are two storeys and a single-storey extension to the east. The windows are mullioned, with some lights blocked.	II
197–201 Longley; 53.63101°N 1.76866°W	—	18th century	A row of three stone houses with a stone slate roof and two storeys. In the upper floor are three three-light windows and some blocked lights, and there is a casement window and three doors in the ground floor.	II
2–6 Roger Lane, Longley; 53.63419°N 1.77315°W	—	18th century	A row of three stone houses with a stone slate roof and two storeys. In the upper floor is a single-light sash window, and the other windows are mullioned, with two lights in the upper floor and three lights in the ground floor.	II
Dog Kennel Bank; 53.63934°N 1.76803°W	—	18th century	A row of three stone houses with stone slate roofs and two storeys. The windows are a mix; some are mullioned, with some lights blocked, others are sashes or casements.	II
Aspley Basin; 53.64482°N 1.77477°W		1774–80	The basin is at the end of Huddersfield Broad Canal, it is surrounded by stone kerbs, and contains mooring irons.	II
Canal warehouse, Aspley Basin; 53.64443°N 1.77557°W		1774–80	The warehouse is in stone with a stone slate roof, and has three storeys and an attic. There is a gabled extension to the north containing loading doors, the top loading door with a round-arched head. The windows are mullioned, and at the west end is a Venetian window with a keystone. At the west end are more loading doors, with balconies, and a winch hoist above them.	II*
Lock No. 1; 53.64203°N 1.77739°W		1793–98	The lock on the Huddersfield Narrow Canal has stone walls and wooden lock gates. There is an overflow culvert on the north side, a cutwater at the west end, and steps at the east end.	II
Lock No. 2; 53.64038°N 1.78061°W		1793–98	The lock on the Huddersfield Narrow Canal has stone walls and wooden lock gates. There is an overflow culvert on the north side, a cutwater at the west end, and steps at the east end.	II
Manchester Road Canal Bridge; 53.64163°N 1.79572°W	—	1793–98	The original bridge carrying Manchester Road (A62 road) over the Huddersfield Narrow Canal, it is in stone, and consists of a single round arch. The bridge is largely obscured by the later road bridge.	II
158 and 160 Ashes Lane, Almondbury; 53.62218°N 1.77462°W		18th or 19th century	A pair of stone houses with stone slate roofs and two storeys. The windows are mullioned casements, with some blocked lights. Adjoining to the right are three barns.	II
23 Hall Bower; 53.62402°N 1.77839°W	—	18th or early 19th century	A stone house at the end of a terrace, with a stone slate roof and two storeys. The windows are mullioned, in the upper floor are three three-light windows, and in the ground floor are two four light windows.	II
27 Hall Bower; 53.62398°N 1.77846°W	—	18th or early 19th century	A stone house in a terrace, with a stone slate roof and two storeys. The windows are mullioned, in the upper floor are two three-light windows, and in the ground floor is one four light window.	II
29 Hall Bower; 53.62394°N 1.77854°W	—	18th or early 19th century	A stone house in a terrace, with a stone slate roof and two storeys. The windows are mullioned, in the upper floor are two three-light windows, and in the ground floor is one four light window.	II
31 Hall Bower; 53.62389°N 1.77861°W	—	18th or early 19th century	A stone house in a terrace, with a stone slate roof and two storeys. The windows are mullioned with three lights; there are two in the upper floor and one in the ground floor.	II
33 Hall Bower; 53.62385°N 1.77865°W	—	18th or early 19th century	A stone house at the end of a terrace, with a stone slate roof and two storeys. The windows are mullioned with three lights; there are two in the upper floor and one in the ground floor.	II
35 and 37 Hall Bower and mistal 53.62375°N 1.77878°W	—	18th or early 19th century	The houses and mistal are in stone with a stone slate roof and two storeys. At the east end are casement windows, and the other windows are mullioned.	II
11 and 13 Greenhead Road, Highfields; 53.64690°N 1.78925°W	—	18th or early 19th century	A pair of stone houses in a terrace with a stone slate roof and two storeys. The doorways are towards the outside, there is one single-light window, and the other windows are mullioned with three lights.	II
19 Greenhead Road, Highfields; 53.64683°N 1.78946°W	—	18th or early 19th century	A stone house in a terrace, with a band, a modillioned eaves cornice, and a stone slate roof. There are two storeys and two bays. The doorway in the left bay has a fanlight, and the windows are sashes.	II
191 Longley; 53.63119°N 1.76864°W	—	18th or 19th century	A stone house with a stone slate roof and two storeys. The windows are mullioned, with three two-light windows and some blocked lights in the upper floor, and a three-light and a two-light window in the ground floor.	II
1 and 3 Towngate, Newsome; 53.62899°N 1.78491°W		18th or 19th century	A pair of stone houses with a stone slate roof and two storeys. In the ground floor of No. 1 is a former shop window, and the other windows are mullioned casements.	II
Bank Foot House; 53.61797°N 1.79759°W	—	18th or early 19th century	The house, which was extended to the south in the 19th century, is in stone, with stone gutter brackets, and a stone slate roof. Each part has two storeys and two bays, and the later part is higher. The windows in the older part are casements, and in the later part they are sashes. Also in the later part is a canted bay window with a moulded cornice and a blocking course, and a doorway with a fanlight and a moulded cornice.	II
Castle House Farmhouse; 53.63416°N 1.76447°W	—	18th or early 19th century	The house is in stone with a stone slate roof. There are two storeys and two bays, and the windows are mullioned.	II
East View and The Hermitage; 53.62060°N 1.80133°W	—	18th or early 19th century	A pair of stone houses with a stone slate roof and two storeys. The windows in The Hermitage are mullioned, with some mullions removed, and some lights blocked, and the windows in East View are modern.	II
Goodham Farmhouse; 53.62649°N 1.77464°W	—	18th or 19th century	A farmhouse and barn in one range, they are in stone, with a stone slate roof and two storeys. The house has mullioned casement windows, and in the barn are various openings and an outshut to the east.	II
Jack Royd; 53.62844°N 1.77817°W	—	18th or 19th century	A pair of stone houses with a stone slate roof and two storeys. One house has modern windows in the ground floor, and the other windows are mullioned casements.	II
Jockey Hall; 53.63991°N 1.76695°W	—	18th or early 19th century	A stone house with a stone slate roof. There are two storeys and seven bays, and the windows are sashes.	II
Kings Mill; 53.63961°N 1.77598°W	—	Late 18th or early 19th century	The mill, which has been converted into residential accommodation, is in stone and has a stone slate roof with coped gables. There are four storeys and twelve bays. On the south side is a staircase projection.	II
Tolson House; 53.62078°N 1.80211°W	—	18th or early 19th century	A stone house with a stone slate roof, two storeys and three bays. The doorway has Tuscan pilasters and an entablature. The windows on the front are sashes with moulded surrounds, those in the ground floor with moulded cornices, and at the rear are mullioned casement windows.	II
Holy Trinity Church, Highfields; 53.64990°N 1.79296°W		1816–19	The church was designed by Thomas Taylor in Gothic style. It is built in sandstone with slate roofs, and consists of a nave with a clerestory, north and south aisles, a chancel with a north organ chamber and a south vestry, and a west tower. There is a crypt beneath the nave and aisles. The tower has four stages, angle buttresses, a west doorway, clock faces, and an embattled parapet with corner pinnacles. The sides of the body of the church also have embattled parapets, and the nave buttresses rise to pinnacles. The east window has five lights.	II*
Outer gate piers, Holy Trinity Church; 53.64926°N 1.79349°W		1816–19 (probable)	The gate piers on Trinity Street are in stone. They have chamfered conical caps, and the gates are in cast iron.	II
40–48 Wakefield Road, Aspley; 53.64412°N 1.77465°W	—	Early 19th century	A row of two shops and two houses, in stone, with a sill band, a moulded cornice over the ground floor, a moulded eaves cornice, and a stone slate roof. There are two storeys and six bays. In the ground floor are two shop fronts, one with four Tuscan pilasters. Between the shop fronts are two doorways, one with an oblong fanlight, and the other a passage doorway with a semicircular fanlight and moulded imposts. In the upper floor are sash windows.	II
11–15 Lower Park, Berry Brow; 53.61541°N 1.78566°W	—	Early 19th century (probable)	A row of stone houses that have a stone slate roof with coped gables on kneelers, and two storeys. Some windows are mullioned and contain pointed-arched casements, and others are sashes.	II
3 Greenhead Road, Highfields; 53.64694°N 1.78893°W	—	Early 19th century (probable)	A stone house in a terrace, with stone gutter brackets and a stone slate roof with coped gables. There are two storeys and two bays. Four steps with ornate cast iron railings lead up to the door, and the windows are sashes.	II
22 Woodhead Road, Lockwood; 53.63179°N 1.79436°W	—	Early 19th century	A stone house with a stone slate roof and two storeys. There is a single-light window in the upper floor, and the other windows are mullioned, with two three-light windows in the upper floor, and a four-light window in the ground floor.	II
24–28 Woodhead Road, Lockwood; 53.63170°N 1.79447°W	—	Early 19th century	A row of three stone houses with a stone slate roof and two storeys. In the upper floor there are four three-light mullioned windows, and in the ground floor the windows have been replaced by modern windows.	II
1–5 Longroyd Lane, Lower Fold; 53.64182°N 1.79588°W	—	Early 19th century	A row of three shops, now derelict, in stone, with a hipped stone slate roof, and two storeys. They contain doorways, sash windows, and shop windows, including an oriel shop window.	II
162 Manchester Road, Lower Fold; 53.64199°N 1.79530°W	—	Early 19th century	A shop in a terrace, it is rendered, and has stone gutter brackets and a stone slate roof. There are three storeys and one bay. In the ground floor is a shop window with a moulded cornice, and the upper floors contain three-light mullioned sash windows.	II
54 Lowerhouses Lane, Lowerhouses; 53.63679°N 1.76561°W	—	Early 19th century	A stone house in a terrace, with a stone slate roof and two storeys. The windows are mullioned, in the upper floor are two two-light windows, and in the ground floor is one three-light window.	II
56 Lowerhouses Lane, Lowerhouses; 53.63674°N 1.76563°W	—	Early 19th century	A stone house in a terrace, with a stone slate roof and two storeys. The windows are mullioned with two lights, there are two in the upper floor and one in the ground floor.	II
75–79 Lowerhouses Lane, Lowerhouses; 53.63543°N 1.76556°W	—	Early 19th century	A row of stone houses with a stone slate roof. There are two storeys, and a single-storey barn extension to No. 79. The windows are mullioned, with six two-light windows in the upper floor and three three-light windows on the ground floor.	II
63–69 Smithy Lane, Moldgreen; 53.63976°N 1.76771°W	—	Early 19th century	A row of four stone houses with stone gutter brackets and a stone slate roof. There are two storeys, and the windows are mullioned, with some mullions removed.	II
27–31 Towngate, Newsome; 53.62847°N 1.78558°W	—	Early 19th century (probable)	A terrace of three stone houses with a stone slate roof. There are two storeys, and each house has two bays. The doorways are to the left, the windows in No. 31 are sashes, and in the other houses they are mullioned with three lights.	II
30–40 Towngate, Newsome; 53.62864°N 1.78569°W	—	Early 19th century (probable)	A terrace of six stone houses, two houses are rendered, and they have a stone slate roof. There are two storeys, and each house has two bays, with the doorways on the left. The windows are mullioned, No. 30 has a six light window, and most of the other windows have three lights.	II
20–24 Taylor Hill Road, Taylor Hill; 53.62976°N 1.79679°W	—	Early 19th century	A row of three stone houses with a stone slate roof. There are two storeys at the front and three at the rear. The windows are two or three-light mullioned casements.	II
Former Albion Public House; 53.64197°N 1.79542°W		Early 19th century	The building is in stone, with stone gutter brackets, and a stone slate roof, catslide at the rear. There are three storeys and two bays. In the upper floors and the left return are three-light mullioned windows and the ground floor contains paired sash windows.	II
Dodds Royd; 53.62211°N 1.79841°W	—	Early 19th century	A farmhouse and a barn in one range, they are in stone with a stone slate roof. The house has two storeys, and a mix of mullioned sash windows and casement windows. The barn has an elliptically-headed arch.	II
Former Crimea public house 53.63420°N 1.78531°W	—	Early 19th century	The former public house is rendered, and has a stone slate roof and two storeys. The windows are mullioned, with a three-light window in each floor and a two-light window in the upper floor.	II
Longley Working Men's Club and The Lowerhouses; 53.63352°N 1.76609°W	—	Early 19th century	A row of stone houses with a stone slate roof and two storeys. Some windows have been altered, but most are mullioned, with some lights blocked.	II
Spring Lodge; 53.64265°N 1.79455°W	—	Early 19th century	The building is in stone, with quoins, sill bands, a moulded eaves cornice, a parapet with balustraded sections, and a hipped stone slate roof. There are two storeys and three bays. On the south front is a Doric porch, and the windows are sashes.	II
Tolson Cottage; 53.62043°N 1.80223°W	—	Early 19th century (probable)	Originally a coach house, it is in stone with a stone slate roof and coped gables. There are two storeys, and in the centre is a pediment containing a round-arched window with a keystone and imposts in the tympanum. Some windows are original, and others are sashes.	II
Armitage Bridge House; 53.61746°N 1.79512°W	—	1828	The house, designed by R. D. Chantrell and later converted into flats, is in stone with a sill band, a moulded eaves cornice and blocking course, and a hipped slate roof. There are two storeys, a main block of five bays, the middle bay projecting slightly, a single-storey extension to the west, a two-storey extension to the east, and a single-storey extension further to the east with an arcaded basement. The porch has two fluted Ionic columns, a full entablature and a blocking course. The windows are sashes, and at the rear are two conservatories.	II
1, 3 and 5 Water Street, Springwood; 53.64564°N 1.79053°W	—	1828	Originally the offices of the Huddersfield Waterworks Commissioners, and then (from 1869) Huddersfield Corporation Waterworks Department, later converted for residential use, the building is in stone with a moulded eaves cornice and blocking course, and a hipped slate roof. There are two storeys and seven bays, the middle three bays projecting under a pediment containing an inscribed and dated oval plaque in the tympanum. On the front are three doorways, and the windows are sashes.	II
Emmanuel House; 53.63020°N 1.79545°W		1828–29	Originally a Commissioners' church designed by R. D. Chantrell, with the chancel added in 1848, it was converted for residential use in the late 20th century. It is built in sandstone, the nave has a slate roof, and the roof of the chancel is tiled. The church consists of a nave, a west porch, a lower chancel and a south vestry. At the corners of the nave are octagonal buttresses that rise to embattled turrets. On the west gable end is a bellcote with a crocketed pyramidal roof. The three-light east and west windows, and the lancet windows along the nave contain Decorated tracery.	II
St Paul's Hall; 53.64374°N 1.77985°W		1828–31	Originally a Commissioners' church designed by John Oates, the chancel was added in 1883–84, and the church has been converted into a concert hall. It is built in stone with a slate roof, and consists of a nave with a clerestory, north and south aisles, a chancel with a polygonal apse, a vestry, and a west steeple. The steeple has a tower with three stages, diagonal buttresses, an embattled parapet, and an octagonal spire with two tiers of gabled lucarnes.	II
Huddersfield Technical College; 53.64831°N 1.78893°W		1831	Originally an infirmary, later used by the technical college as its business and administrative centre, it is in stone, with a hipped slate roof. The building has a sill band, a moulded eaves cornice and a blocking course. There are two storeys, nine bays, and sash windows. On the front is a portico with four Greek Doric columns, a doorway with an Egyptian surround, and a lamp on an ornamental cast iron bracket.	II*
St Patrick's Church, Highfields; 53.64899°N 1.78802°W		1832	A Roman Catholic church, to which a narthex was added in 1962, it is in stone with a slate roof, a coped gable at the west end, and a canted apse at the east end. The central part of the west gable is embattled, and contains a three-light window with Perpendicular tracery. It is flanked by octagonal turrets with conical caps and foliate finials, and at the corners are diagonal buttresses with crocketed pinnacles. The windows along the sides and in the apse are lancets.	II
Wall in front of St Patrick's Church and 30, 32 and 34 New North Road; 53.64884°N 1.78816°W	—	1832 (presumed)	A dwarf stone wall extends along the front of the grounds of the church and the gardens of the houses. Each house has a pair of simple gate piers, and in front of the church are three pairs of piers with traceried panels and conical caps.	II
Priestroyd Mills; 53.63972°N 1.78171°W		1835	The mills were extended and the corner tower added in 1869. The building is in stone on a corner site, with a modillion eaves cornice, coped gables on kneelers, and slate roof. It consists of two blocks at an acute angle with a rounded corner. The Firth Street block has five storeys and 17 bays, and the block on Queen Street South has four storeys and 14 bays. The tower is a storey higher and has a steep tiled roof with gabled lucarnes and elaborate cast iron cresting.	II
2 and 4 Dean Brook Road, Armitage Bridge; 53.62026°N 1.80212°W		Early or mid-19th century	A pair of stone houses at the end of a terrace, with stone gutter brackets, and a stone slate roof. There are two storeys, and the windows are mullioned, with one light blocked.	II
1 and 3 Lockwood Scar; 53.63228°N 1.79414°W		Early or mid-19th century	A pair of stone houses with rusticated quoins, a modillion eaves cornice, and a stone slate roof. There are three storeys and attics, and three bays on the front. In the centre are two doorways with moulded frames, friezes, and moulded cornices, and the windows are paired sashes. In the left return are mullioned windows and two loading doors, the lower door approached by a flight of twelve stone steps.	II
18 Manchester Road, Lower Fold; 53.64223°N 1.78562°W	—	Early or mid-19th century	A stone shop in a terrace, with stone gutter brackets and a stone slate roof. There are two storeys and two bays. The doorway has a fanlight, and the windows are sashes.	II
20–44 Manchester Road, Lower Fold; 53.64210°N 1.78634°W		Early or mid-19th century	A terrace of stone houses with a sill band, stone gutter brackets, and stone slate roofs. There are three storeys, some houses have basements, and most houses have two bays. The doorways have oblong fanlights, and there are passage doorways with blind semicircular fanlights. In the ground floor the windows are modern, and most of the windows in the upper floors are sashes.	II
160 Manchester Road, Lower Fold; 53.64200°N 1.79522°W	—	Early or mid-19th century	A shop in a terrace, it is rendered, and has stone gutter brackets and a stone slate roof. There are three storeys and four bays. In the ground floor is a 19th-century shop front, and the upper floors contain sash windows.	II
48 South Street, Springwood; 53.64544°N 1.78850°W	—	Early or mid-19th century	The building on a corner site is in stone with a hipped slate roof. There are two storeys, one bay on South Street, three on Spring Street, and a curved bay on the corner. There are two doorways, one in the corner bay and one in Spring Street, both with Tuscan pilasters and a cornice, and the windows are sashes.	II
50 and 52 South Street, Springwood; 53.64540°N 1.78853°W	—	Early or mid-19th century	A pair of stone houses with a slate roof. There are two storeys, and each house has two bays. No. 52 has a band and moulded gutter brackets, and the windows in both houses are sashes.	II
31 Spring Street, Springwood; 53.64545°N 1.78887°W	—	Early or mid-19th century	A stone house in a terrace, with a moulded eaves cornice, a blocking course with a sculpted wreath and acroteria, and a slate roof. There are two storeys and two bays. In the ground floor is a canted bay window with Tuscan piers, a moulded cornice, a blocking course, and a sculpted wreath. The doorway to the left has Tuscan pilasters, a full dentilled entablature, and a blocking course with a sculpted wreath. In the upper floor are sash windows with moulded surrounds.	II
31A Spring Street, Springwood; 53.64545°N 1.78877°W	—	Early or mid-19th century	A stone house in a terrace, with a moulded eaves cornice, and a slate roof. There are two storeys and two bays. The doorway has Tuscan pilasters, a full entablature, and a blocking course. The windows are sashes with moulded surrounds.	II
33 Spring Street, Springwood; 53.64545°N 1.78897°W	—	Early or mid-19th century	A stone house in a terrace, with a moulded eaves cornice, a blocking course, and a slate roof. There are two storeys and two bays. The doorway has Tuscan pilasters, a moulded cornice, and a blocking course, and the windows are sashes.	II
37–41 Spring Street, Springwood; 53.64546°N 1.78919°W	—	Early or mid-19th century	A row of three stone houses at the end of a terrace, they have a moulded eaves cornice, a blocking course, and a slate roof. There are two storeys and five bays. In the centre is a doorway with a semicircular fanlight, moulded voussoirs and imposts, and in the outer bays are doorways with plain surrounds. The upper floor contains sash windows, and the gardens are enclosed by cast iron railings with spear finials.	II
38–56 Spring Street, Springwood; 53.64569°N 1.78934°W		Early or mid-19th century	A terrace of stone houses, with stone gutter brackets and slate roofs. Each house has two storeys, two bays, and sash windows. The details vary, and features on some houses include a modillion eaves cornice, and a band, In the terrace are a carriage entrance and a passage entry, and the gardens of some houses are enclosed by cast iron railings with spear or urn finials.	II
45–55 Spring Street, Springwood; 53.64549°N 1.78972°W	—	Early or mid-19th century	A terrace of stone houses, with moulded eaves cornices and slate roofs. Each house has two storeys, two bays, and sash windows. Some of the doorways have fanlights, and there is a passage entry with moulded voussoirs and imposts.	II
7 Water Street, Springwood; 53.64550°N 1.79055°W	—	Early or mid-19th century	A stone house at the end of a terrace, with a band, a moulded eaves cornice, a blocking course, and a hipped slate roof. There are two storeys and three bays. Steps lead up to a central doorway, to the left is a canted bay window with a moulded cornice and blocking course, and the other windows are sashes.	II
Barn, Armitage Bridge House; 53.61792°N 1.79468°W	—	Early or mid-19th century	The barn consists of six large stone piers with a slate roof. It is open on all four sides.	II
Coach house, Armitage Bridge House; 53.61770°N 1.79468°W	—	Early or mid-19th century	The former coach house is in stone, with angle pilasters and a hipped slate roof. There are two storeys and five bays. The middle bay projects, it has a parapet with Greek key decoration, and contains segmental-arched carriage doorways. In the outer bays are four round arches, two with doors and two with fanlights.	II
Gate, gate piers and railings, Armitage Bridge House; 53.61894°N 1.79691°W	—	Early or mid-19th century	At the entrance to the drive are two pairs of wrought iron gates, and the railings flank the lodge. The gate piers are in stone, they are panelled, and have segmental caps.	II
Lodge, Armitage Bridge House; 53.61893°N 1.79674°W	—	Early or mid-19th century	The lodge at the entrance to the drive is in stone with a hipped slate roof. There is one storey, two corners are rounded, and it contains Tuscan pilasters and a full entablature. The two doorways have moulded surrounds, and the windows are sashes.	II
Summerhouse, Armitage Bridge House; 53.61754°N 1.79447°W	—	Early or mid-19th century	The summer house to the east of the main house is in stone, and has one storey. Its front is that of an Ionic temple with four columns, and the door in the portico has a moulded surround.	II
East Block, Armitage Bridge Mill; 53.61832°N 1.79899°W	—	Early or mid-19th century	The block is in stone, with stone gutter brackets and a stone slate roof. There are four storeys, 13 bays along the front and four at the sides. The gable end has a parapet flanked by scrolled consoles and surmounted by a pediment. The building contains a blocked archway with an impost band and a pediment.	II
Bridge over River Holme; 53.61922°N 1.79676°W		Early or mid-19th century	The bridge carries Armitage Road (B6110 road) over the River Holme at Armitage Bridge. It is in stone and consists of a single segmental arch. The bridge has a band and a parapet, and there are cylindrical piers at the ends.	II
The Greyhound Hotel; 53.64226°N 1.78551°W		Early or mid-19th century	The hotel is in stone with stone gutter brackets and a stone slate roof. There are three storeys and four bays. The main doorway has pilasters and a pediment, and the windows are sashes, two in the ground floor with moulded and shaped surrounds.	II
Huddersfield Technical College (Highfield Annexe); 53.65084°N 1.79138°W		1839	Originally Huddersfield College, it was designed by J. P. Pritchett in Tudor style. It is built in stone, with an embattled parapet, corner turrets, and a hipped slate roof. The building is mainly in two storeys, with a three-storey central hall. On the front is a projecting gabled wing containing a doorway with a four-centred arched head, side lights, a traceried surround and an embattled top, and above it is a three-light window with a hood mould. To the sides are mullioned windows with hood moulds.	II
Railings, Huddersfield Technical College (Highfield Annexe); 53.65086°N 1.79179°W	—	c. 1839 (presumed)	Surrounding the forecourt of the building are cast iron railings with cruciform finials, interspersed with plain stone chamfered piers.	II
Kings Mill House and Lynwood; 53.64013°N 1.77530°W	—	c. 1840	A house that was extended and divided in about 1890, it is in stone on a plinth, with moulded eaves, a low parapet and a hipped slate roof. There are two storeys and an attic, four bays, and a projecting wing to the right. The doorway has Doric columns, a fanlight and a moulded hood. On each side is a canted bay window with pilasters. The windows on the front are sashes, on the sides they are mainly casements, and at the rear is a stair window.	II
Former Staff Block, (Block 9), Princess Royal Community Hospital; 53.64663°N 1.79125°W	—	1842	The building is in stone with an embattled parapet. There are two storeys and three bays, the middle bay projecting under a gable with a finial. Steps lead up to the central doorway that has a moulded four-centred arched head, flanked by similar windows, and above is blind tracery and a parapet containing a dated shield. The windows are sashes with hood moulds, and the window above the doorway has a pointed head and is flanked by arrow slits.	II
Highfield United Reformed Church; 53.65122°N 1.79167°W		1843–44	The church, later converted for residential use, is in stone with a moulded eaves cornice, a blocking course, and a hipped slate roof. There are two storeys and five bays. The outer bays project and have giant Tuscan pilasters, and giant Ionic columns on plinths, with full entablatures, and large parapets that contain piers and have pedimented centres. In the middle bays are sash windows and moulded panels in round-arched surrounds.	II
Principal building, Folly Hall Mill; 53.64031°N 1.78714°W		1844	The mill building is in stone, with a moulded eaves cornice, a parapet, and a slate roof. There are five storeys and attics, 17 bays on the front, and five bays on the sides. The two outer bays at each end have round-arched windows and moulded pediments, and over the middle three bays is a pediment with a five-light Venetian window in the tympanum.	II*
Former school, Portland Street; 53.64845°N 1.79026°W	—	1845	The former school is in stone with a hipped slate roof. There are two storeys, and the ground floor is blind. In the upper floor is a sash window with a moulded surround, and above is an inscribed plaque. There are paired pilasters at the corners, a moulded cornice, and a pediment-shaped blocking course containing the date.	II
East portals, Gledholt Tunnels; 53.64345°N 1.79503°W	—	1845–49	The north portal is the earlier, with the south portal added in 1882–86. Both portals are similar, they are in gritstone, and each consists of a semicircular moulded arch with a pier on the south side. Above is moulding that acts as a cornice.	II
West portals, Gledholt Tunnels; 53.64375°N 1.79324°W		1845–49	The north portal is the earlier, with the south portal added in 1882–86. They are in gritstone, and each consists of a semicircular moulded arch, the south arch slightly taller. Above the arches is narrow coping.	II
Lockwood Railway Viaduct; 53.62832°N 1.80041°W		1846–49	The viaduct carries the railway over the valley of the River Holme. It is in stone and consists of 38 round arches, and one segmental arch over Woodhead Road. The viaduct has a band, and a parapet and is 136 feet (41 m) high.	II
St Paul's Church, Armitage Bridge; 53.61968°N 1.79841°W		1847–48	The church was designed by R. D. Chantrell in Decorated style, but it was badly damaged by fire in 1987, and the body of the church was restored and reordered in 1990. It is built in stone, with slate roofs, and a lead roof to the vestry. The church consists of a nave, north and south aisles, a south porch, a chancel with a southeast vestry, and a west tower. The tower has angle buttresses rising to octagonal pinnacles with gablets and crocketed finials, and an openwork parapet. The exterior of the church is highly decorated, and the porch has buttresses containing niches, a doorway with a moulded surround, and another niche in the gable. Over the doorway is a sundial with a traceried iron gnomon.	II
Churchyard gate, St Paul's Church, Armitage Bridge; 53.61930°N 1.79842°W	—	1848 (presumed)	At the entrance to the churchyard is a pointed archway in stone with a steep pitched gable. On the arch is an iron lamp bracket.	II
6 Dean Brook Road, Armitage Bridge; 53.62037°N 1.80195°W	—	Mid-19th century	A stone house in a terrace, with rusticated quoins, a modillion eaves cornice, and a stone slate roof. There are three storeys and one bay, and the windows are sashes.	II
8 Dean Brook Road, Armitage Bridge; 53.62039°N 1.80191°W	—	Mid-19th century	A stone house in a terrace, with a modillion eaves cornice, and a stone slate roof. There are three storeys and one bay, and the windows are sashes.	II
10 Dean Brook Road, Armitage Bridge; 53.62044°N 1.80189°W	—	Mid-19th century	A stone house in a terrace, with a modillion eaves cornice and a stone slate roof. There are three storeys and one bay, and the windows are sashes.	II
12 Dean Brook Road, Armitage Bridge; 53.62046°N 1.80182°W	—	Mid-19th century	A stone house at the end of a terrace, with rusticated quoins, a modillion eaves cornice, and a stone slate roof. There are three storeys and one bay. On the ground floor is an oblong bay window, and the other windows are sashes.	II
10 Kings Mill Lane, Aspley; 53.64257°N 1.77221°W	—	Mid-19th century	A stone house with a moulded eaves cornice, a blocking course, and a slate roof. There are two storeys and a symmetrical front of three bays. The central doorway has three-quarter Tuscan columns, an entablature and a blocking course, and the windows are sashes.	II
Gate piers, 17 and 19 Kings Mill Lane; 53.64049°N 1.77551°W	—	Mid-19th century	The gate piers at the entrance to the drive are in stone. They are square and have moulded panels and moulded caps.	II
6–20 Chapel Hill; 53.64204°N 1.78492°W	—	Mid-19th century	A row of stone shops with a moulded eaves cornice and a stone slate roof. There are three storeys and each shop has two bays. In the ground floor are modern shop fronts, and the upper floors contain sash windows.	II
13 and 15 Chapel Hill; 53.64139°N 1.78491°W	—	Mid-19th century	The building, on a corner site, is in stone, with a sill band, a moulded eaves cornice and blocking course, and a hipped stone slate roof. There are two storeys, three bays on the front, one on the side, and a curved bay on the corner. The doorway on the corner has Tuscan pilasters and an entablature, and the windows are sashes.	II
38 Chapel Hill; 53.64176°N 1.78514°W		Mid-19th century	The building, on a corner site, is in stone, with a moulded eaves cornice, and a hipped slate roof. There are three storeys, two bays, and a curved corner. In the ground floor are two doorways with fanlights, and a shop window, and the upper floors contain sash windows.	II
9 Hall Bower; 53.62340°N 1.77841°W	—	19th century (probable)	A stone house in a terrace, with a stone slate roof. There are two storeys and two bays, and the windows are sashes.	II
11 Hall Bower; 53.62336°N 1.77847°W	—	19th century (probable)	A stone house in a terrace, with a stone slate roof. There are two storeys and two bays, and the windows are sashes.	II
13 Hall Bower; 53.62333°N 1.77852°W	—	19th century (probable)	A stone house in a terrace, with a stone slate roof. There are two storeys and two bays, and the windows are modern.	II
15 Hall Bower; 53.62331°N 1.77856°W	—	19th century (probable)	A stone house at the end of a terrace, with a stone slate roof. There are two storeys and two bays, and the windows are modern.	II
57 and 59 Hall Bower; 53.62322°N 1.77946°W	—	19th century (probable)	A pair of rendered houses in a terrace, with a stone slate roof and two storeys. There are two casement windows in the upper floor, and the other windows are mullioned, with a three-light and a two-light window in the upper floor, and a three-light window in the ground floor.	II
Hall Bower Athletic Club; 53.62331°N 1.77938°W	—	19th century (probable)	The building is in stone, the upper floor rendered, with a stone slate roof, and two storeys. The windows vary, with single-light and mullioned sash windows in the upper floor.	II
2 Belgrave Terrace, Highfields; 53.65041°N 1.78997°W	—	Mid-19th century	A stone house with a band, a moulded eaves cornice, and a slate roof. There are two storeys and a symmetrical front of three bays. The central doorway has a stone surround, an oblong fanlight, and a segmental pediment, and the windows are sashes.	II
4 Belgrave Terrace, Highfields; 53.65050°N 1.79010°W	—	Mid-19th century	A stone house at the end of a terrace, with a band, a moulded eaves cornice, and a slate roof. There are two storeys and two bays. The doorway has a stone surround, an oblong fanlight, and a segmental pediment, and the windows are sashes.	II
Gate piers, 4 Belgrave Terrace; 53.65033°N 1.79007°W	—	Mid-19th century	The gate piers at the entrance to the garden are in stone. They are panelled and have pedimented caps.	II
6 Belgrave Terrace, Highfields; 53.65051°N 1.79020°W	—	Mid-19th century	A stone house in a terrace, with a band, a moulded eaves cornice, and a slate roof. There are two storeys and two bays. The doorway has a stone surround, an oblong fanlight, and a segmental pediment, and the windows are sashes.	II
Gate piers, 6 Belgrave Terrace; 53.65031°N 1.79017°W	—	Mid-19th century	The gate piers at the entrance to the garden are in stone. They are panelled and have pedimented caps.	II
8 Belgrave Terrace, Highfields; 53.65050°N 1.79035°W	—	Mid-19th century	A stone house in a terrace, with a moulded eaves cornice, and a slate roof. There are three storeys and two bays. The doorway has panelled pilasters and a cornice on tall fluted consoles, and the windows are sashes.	II
Gate piers, 8 Belgrave Terrace; 53.65033°N 1.79032°W	—	Mid-19th century	The gate piers at the entrance to the garden are in stone. They are panelled and have pedimented caps.	II
10 Belgrave Terrace, Highfields; 53.65050°N 1.79046°W	—	Mid-19th century	A stone house in a terrace, with a moulded eaves cornice, and a slate roof. There are three storeys and two bays. The windows are sashes, and in the ground floor is a canted bay window and a doorway, both with panelled pilasters and a cornice on tall fluted consoles. The doorway also has a fanlight.	II
Gate piers, 10 Belgrave Terrace; 53.65033°N 1.79046°W	—	Mid-19th century	The gate piers at the entrance to the garden are in stone. They are panelled and have pedimented caps.	II
12 Belgrave Terrace, Highfields; 53.65050°N 1.79057°W	—	Mid-19th century	A stone house at the end of a terrace, with a moulded eaves cornice, and a slate roof. There are three storeys and two bays. The door has a moulded porch, sidelights, a fanlight, panelled pilasters and a cornice on tall fluted consoles, and the windows are sashes.	II
Gate piers, 12 Belgrave Terrace; 53.65033°N 1.79054°W	—	Mid-19th century	The gate piers at the entrance to the garden are in stone. They are panelled and have pedimented caps.	II
1 Belmont Street, Highfields; 53.65108°N 1.79016°W	—	Mid-19th century	A stone house with a band, a moulded eaves cornice, and a hipped slate roof. There are two storeys, and a symmetrical front of three bays. The central doorway has Tuscan half-columns, a semicircular fanlight, and a full entablature with a blocking course. The windows are casements, and there is a canted bay window on the east front. The gate piers are panelled and have segmental caps.	II
21 Belmont Street, Highfields; 53.65119°N 1.78761°W	—	Mid-19th century	A stone house with a band, a moulded eaves cornice, and a hipped slate roof. There are two storeys and a basement, and fronts of three bays. The central doorway has a moulded surround, a fanlight, and a segmental pediment. The windows are sashes, and in the right return are two canted bay windows with circular decoration in the blocking courses.	II
12 Elmwood Avenue, Highfields; 53.64998°N 1.78812°W	—	Mid-19th century	A stone house with a band, a moulded eaves cornice, and a hipped stone slate roof. There are two storeys and four bays. On the front is a porch with Tuscan columns, a full entablature and a blocking course. The door has a fanlight, and the windows are sashes.	II
14 Elmwood Avenue, Highfields; 53.65006°N 1.78803°W	—	Mid-19th century	A stone house with a band, a moulded eaves cornice, and a hipped stone slate roof. There are two storeys and three bays. On the front is a porch with Tuscan columns, a full entablature and a blocking course. The door has a fanlight, and the windows are sashes. There is a wooden conservatory, canted at the east end, and the door has a pediment on consoles.	II
16 Elmwood Avenue, Highfields; 53.65012°N 1.78805°W	—	Mid-19th century	A stone house with a band, a moulded eaves cornice, and a hipped stone slate roof. There are two storeys and three bays. On the front is a porch with Tuscan columns, a full entablature and a blocking course. The door has a fanlight, and the windows are sashes.	II
18 Elmwood Avenue, Highfields; 53.65016°N 1.78818°W	—	Mid-19th century	A stone house with a band, a moulded eaves cornice, and a hipped stone slate roof. There are two storeys and four bays. On the front is a porch with Tuscan columns, a full entablature and a blocking course. The door has a fanlight, and the windows are sashes, one of which is blocked.	II
83 and 85 Fitzwilliam Street, Highfields; 53.64942°N 1.78771°W	—	Mid-19th century	A pair of stone houses with a sill band, a moulded eaves cornice, a blocking course, and a slate roof. There are two storeys, and each house has two bays. Each doorway has a fanlight and a triangular pediment on gadrooned consoles, and the windows are sashes with moulded surrounds.	II
87 Fitzwilliam Street, Highfields; 53.64939°N 1.78788°W	—	Mid-19th century	A stone house with a band, a moulded eaves cornice, a blocking course, and a slate roof. There are two storeys and a basement, and two bays, the right bay projecting slightly. The windows are sashes, and in the right bay they are tripartite. The doorway has a moulded surround, a rectangular fanlight, and a moulded cornice on consoles, and to the left is a passage door with a semicircular fanlight.	II
109–119 Fitzwilliam Street, Highfields; 53.64877°N 1.79103°W	—	Mid-19th century	A terrace of six stone houses, with modillion eaves cornices, and slate roofs. There are two storeys and basements, and each house has two bays. The doors are approached by steps with cast iron railings, some of the doorways have Tuscan pilasters, others have Ionic pilasters, and the windows are sashes. The basement areas are enclosed by cast iron railings.	II
Wall, 112 Fitzwilliam Street, Highfields; 53.64928°N 1.78946°W	—	Mid-19th century	The dwarf stone wall encloses the garden at the front of the house. It contains stone gate piers that are panelled and have corniced caps.	II
114 Fitzwilliam Street, Highfields; 53.64925°N 1.78984°W	—	Mid-19th century	The building is in stone with a moulded eaves cornice, a blocking course, and a hipped slate roof. There are two storeys and two bays. The doorway is in the right bay, and the windows are sashes.	II
116 Fitzwilliam Street, Highfields; 53.64924°N 1.78994°W	—	Mid-19th century	A stone building on a corner site, it has a moulded eaves cornice, a blocking course, and a hipped slate roof. There are two storeys, two bays on Fitzwilliam Street, three on Portland Street, and a rounded corner. Steps with cast iron railings lead to the doorway that has Tuscan pilasters and a full entablature. The windows are sashes, those in the ground floor with moulded surrounds, and on the Portland Street front is a canted bay window.	II
118 Fitzwilliam Street, Highfields; 53.64913°N 1.79040°W	—	Mid-19th century	A stone house in a terrace, it has a moulded eaves cornice, and a slate roof. There are two storeys and two bays, and the windows are sashes. The doorway in the right bay has Tuscan pilasters, a fanlight, and a full entablature. To the right is a blocked passage entry that has a semicircular fanlight with glazing bars, moulded imposts, and voussoirs.	II
120 Fitzwilliam Street, Highfields; 53.64912°N 1.79052°W	—	Mid-19th century	A stone house in a terrace, it has a moulded eaves cornice, and a slate roof. There are two storeys and two bays, and the windows are sashes. Five steps with cast iron railings that have urn finials lead up to the doorway with Tuscan pilasters, a fanlight, and a full entablature.	II
121 and 123 Fitzwilliam Street, Highfields; 53.64874°N 1.79144°W	—	Mid-19th century	A pair of stone houses with a band, a moulded eaves cornice, and a slate roof. There are two storeys and four bays. The doorways are in the middle bays, they have raised surrounds and pointed fanlights with Gothic glazing bars. Between them is a passage doorway with a rectangular fanlight and a shaped lintel, and over the three openings is a continuous hood mould rising over each. In the outer bays are canted bay windows with moulded cornices, and the other windows are sashes with raised surrounds.	II
122 Fitzwilliam Street, Highfields; 53.64909°N 1.79062°W	—	Mid-19th century	A stone house in a terrace with a moulded eaves cornice, and a slate roof. There are two storeys and two bays, and the windows are sashes. The doorway has Tuscan pilasters, a fanlight, and a full entablature, and to the left is a blocked passage entry that has a semicircular fanlight with glazing bars, moulded imposts, and voussoirs.	II
124 and 126 Fitzwilliam Street, Highfields; 53.64906°N 1.79078°W	—	Mid-19th century	A pair of stone houses in a terrace with a moulded eaves cornice, and a slate roof. There are two storeys, each house has two bays, and the windows are sashes. The doorways have Tuscan pilasters, fanlights, and each has a full entablature.	II
128 Fitzwilliam Street, Highfields; 53.64904°N 1.79093°W	—	Mid-19th century	A stone house in a terrace with a moulded eaves cornice, and a slate roof. There are two storeys and two bays, and the windows are sashes. The doorway has Tuscan pilasters, a fanlight, and a full entablature.	II
130 Fitzwilliam Street, Highfields; 53.64902°N 1.79104°W	—	Mid-19th century	A stone house in a terrace with a moulded eaves cornice, and a slate roof. There are two storeys and a basement, and two bays, and the windows are modern. The doorway has Tuscan pilasters, a fanlight, and a full entablature, and to the right is a passage entry that has moulded imposts and voussoirs. Ornate cast iron railings enclose the basement area.	II
132 Fitzwilliam Street, Highfields; 53.64900°N 1.79115°W	—	Mid-19th century	A stone house in a terrace with a moulded eaves cornice, and a slate roof. There are two storeys and two bays, and the windows are modern. The doorway has Tuscan pilasters, a fanlight, and a full entablature, and to the right is a passage entry converted into a window that has moulded imposts and voussoirs.	II
134 Fitzwilliam Street, Highfields; 53.64898°N 1.79125°W	—	Mid-19th century	A stone house in a terrace with a moulded eaves cornice, and a slate roof. There are two storeys and two bays, and the windows are sashes. The doorway has Tuscan pilasters, a fanlight, and a full entablature.	II
136 Fitzwilliam Street, Highfields; 53.64896°N 1.79134°W	—	Mid-19th century	A stone house in a terrace with a moulded eaves cornice, and a slate roof. There are two storeys and two bays, and the windows are sashes. The doorway has Tuscan pilasters, a fanlight, and a full entablature.	II
25 Greenhead Road, Highfields; 53.64680°N 1.78965°W	—	Mid-19th century	A stone house, later used for other purposes, it has a moulded eaves cornice, and a stone slate roof with coped gables. There are two storeys and two bays, and the windows are sashes. The doorway has Tuscan pilasters, a fanlight, an entablature and a blocking course. To the left is a passage door with a fanlight.	II
27 and 29 Greenhead Road, Highfields; 53.64673°N 1.78985°W	—	Mid-19th century	A pair of stone houses with a band, a modillion eaves cornice, and a stone slate roof. There are two storeys and each house has three bays. The doorways have Tuscan pilasters, fanlights, and full entablatures. The windows are sashes, and in No. 29 is a canted bay window with a moulded cornice and a blocking course.	II
3 Highfields Road, Highfields; 53.65095°N 1.79072°W	—	Mid-19th century	A stone house with a band, a moulded eaves cornice, and a slate roof. There are two storeys and five bays. In the right bay is a canted bay window with a moulded cornice and a blocking course, and the other windows are sashes.	II
Gate piers, 51A, 51B and 51C New North Road, Highfields; 53.64995°N 1.79049°W	—	Mid-19th century	There are two pairs of gate piers and a single pier at the boundary. They are in stone, chamfered, and each has a bulge in the centre and a conical cap.	II
Gate piers and wall, 53 New North Road, Highfields; 53.65021°N 1.79091°W	—	Mid-19th century	The garden of the house is enclosed by a dwarf stone wall. It contains two pairs of stone gate piers with semicircular caps.	II
Gate piers, 55 and 57 New North Road, Highfields; 53.65038°N 1.79121°W	—	Mid-19th century	The gate piers at the entrance to the garden are in stone. They have depressed arched panels and moulded caps.	II
Gate piers, 59 New North Road, Highfields; 53.65045°N 1.79137°W	—	Mid-19th century	The gate piers at the entrance to the garden are in stone. They have depressed arched panels and moulded caps.	II
Wall, 63 and 65 New North Road, Highfields; 53.65084°N 1.79205°W	—	Mid-19th century	The dwarf stone wall is coped and encloses the gardens of the houses. It contains two pairs of unmoulded gate piers, each with a simple semicircular acroterion.	II
Wall, 70 New North Road, Highfields; 53.65125°N 1.79249°W	—	Mid-19th century	The dwarf wall that runs along the front of the garden is in stone and is coped. It contains two pairs of panelled gate piers, those at the south end with carved cornices, and those in the centre with crocketing below the cornice and urn-like finials.	II
Wall, 71 New North Road, Highfields; 53.65098°N 1.79244°W	—	Mid-19th century	The stone wall encloses the forecourt of the house. It contains two panelled gate piers with pyramidal finials.	II
2–14 Portland Street, Highfields; 53.64809°N 1.79022°W	—	Mid-19th century	A terrace of seven stone houses with stone gutter brackets and a slate roof. There are two storeys, and the houses have two bays each. The windows are sashes, the doorways have fanlights, and there is a passage entry with a blind semicircular fanlight, moulded imposts, and voussoirs.	II
36 Portland Street, Highfields; 53.64920°N 1.79028°W	—	Mid-19th century	A stone house on a corner site, with a moulded eaves cornice, and a hipped slate roof. There are two storeys, three bays, and a rounded corner. The doorway has Tuscan pilasters, a full entablature, and a blocking course, and the windows are sashes.	II
38 and 40 Portland Street, Highfields; 53.64929°N 1.79027°W	—	Mid-19th century	A pair of stone houses with a moulded eaves cornice, and a slate roof. There are two storeys, and each house has two bays. The doorways have Tuscan pilasters, a full entablature, and a blocking course, and the windows are sashes.	II
35 and 37 Trinity Street, Highfields; 53.64696°N 1.78888°W	—	Mid-19th century	A shop and a house in stone, with a moulded eaves cornice and blocking course, and a slate roof. There are two storeys, each part has two bays, and the windows are sashes. No. 35 has an early 20th-century shop front, and No. 37 has a doorway with Tuscan pilasters, an entablature and a blocking course.	II
80–86, 90, 92, 96 and 100 Trinity Street, Highfields; 53.64813°N 1.79072°W	—	Mid-19th century	A terrace of eight stone houses, most with a modillion eaves cornice, and with stone slate roofs. There are two storeys and each house has two bays. The doorways of Nos. 80 and 82 have fanlights, Tuscan pilasters, and a full entablature, and the other doorways have moulded surrounds and cornices. Some passage entries have blind fanlights, moulded voussoirs and imposts, and others have plain surrounds.	II
95–99 Trinity Street, Highfields; 53.64806°N 1.79128°W	—	Mid-19th century	A row of three stone houses in a terrace, with bands, a moulded eaves cornice, and stone slate roofs. There are two storeys and basements, each house has two bays, and the windows are sashes. No. 95 has a round-headed passage doorway with a semicircular fanlight and moulded imposts, and Nos. 95 and 97 have cast iron railings enclosing the basement areas.	II
103 Trinity Street, Highfields; 53.64819°N 1.79160°W	—	Mid-19th century	A stone house with a band, a moulded eaves cornice, and a slate roof with pierced ridge tiles. There are two storeys and two bays, the left bay projecting and gabled. The windows, which are sashes, and the doorway in the right bay, have elaborate and decorative surrounds.	II
104, 106 and 110–116 Trinity Street, Highfields; 53.64840°N 1.79135°W	—	Mid-19th century	A terrace of six stone houses, with a modillion eaves cornice, and stone slate roofs. There are two storeys and each house has two bays. The windows are sashes, and the doorways have fanlights and moulded cornices. Most of the passage entries have blind fanlights, moulded voussoirs and imposts.	II
105 Trinity Street, Highfields; 53.64823°N 1.79168°W	—	Mid-19th century	A stone house with a band, a moulded eaves cornice, and a stone slate roof. There are two storeys and two bays, and the windows are sashes.	II
Wall and gatepiers, 128, 130 and 132 Trinity Street, Highfields; 53.64913°N 1.79317°W	—	Mid-19th century	The wall is in stone, and runs along the fronts of the gardens. It contains stone tapering gate piers that are panelled and have moulded caps.	II
128–134 Trinity Street, Highfields; 53.64912°N 1.79287°W	—	Mid-19th century	A row of stone houses with quoins, a modillion eaves cornice, and a slate roof with coped gables. There are two storeys and six bays. The windows are sashes, and in the ground floor are two canted bay windows, all with moulded frames and cornices. The doorways have panelled jambs, moulded transoms, semicircular fanlights, moulded voussoirs, and anthemion cresting.	II
23–31 Upper George Street, Highfields; 53.64624°N 1.78925°W	—	Mid-19th century	A row of houses in a terrace in stone, with a band, a moulded eaves cornice, and slate roofs. There are two storeys, and each house has two bays. The windows are sashes, some doorways have fanlights, there are passage entries with blind semicircular fanlights, raised voussoirs, and moulded imposts, and one house has cast iron railings with spear finials.	II
1–25 Wentworth Street, Highfields; 53.64940°N 1.79198°W	—	Mid-19th century	A terrace of stone houses with moulded eaves cornices and blocking courses, and slate roofs. There are two storeys, some houses with attics, and some with basements, and each house has two bays. The doorways have Tuscan pilasters, full entablatures, and blocking courses. The windows are sashes, some with moulded surrounds, and some houses have dormers. There are two passage entries with round heads and blind fanlights, and No. 25 has a passage entry with moulded imposts and voussoirs converted into a window.	II
2 Newhouse Place, Highfields; 53.65062°N 1.78887°W	—	Mid-19th century	A stone house with a string course, overhanging eaves with a fretwork valance, and a pyramidal slate roof. The windows are sashes, and there are ornamental oculi. On the north side is a doorway with an ornamental shaped lintel, a sash window, and a dormer.	II
Front block, 29 Albert Street, Lockwood; 53.63421°N 1.79248°W	—	Mid-19th century	The block is in stone with a moulded eaves cornice, a parapet, and two storeys. The left part contains three blocked windows in each floor, those in the ground floor round-arched with voussoirs and an impost band. The right part has segment-headed sash windows, and a doorway with a segment-headed fanlight. To the right is a round-arched carriage entry that has jambs with vermiculated panels, voussoirs and a keystone, alternately moulded and vermiculated.	II
188, 188A and 188B Lockwood Road, Lockwood; 53.63560°N 1.79216°W		Mid-19th century	Originally the hotel for the nearby Lockwood Baths, the building is in stone with a sill band, a moulded eaves cornice and blocking course, and a hipped slate roof. There are three storeys and four bays. Steps with Regency-style railings lead up to the doorway that has Tuscan three-quarter columns, a full entablature, and an oblong fanlight. In the left bay is a carriage entrance with a three-centred arched head and moulded voussoirs. The windows are sashes.	II
166 and 168 Manchester Road, Lower Fold; 53.64187°N 1.79560°W	—	Mid-19th century	A stone shop with overhanging eaves and a hipped slate roof. There are two storeys and three bays. In the ground floor are shop windows and the upper floor contains sash windows.	II
96 and 98 Lowerhouses Lane, Lowerhouses; 53.63586°N 1.76611°W	—	19th century	A pair of stone houses with a stone slate roof and two storeys. In the ground floor of the right house is a modern window, and the other windows are mullioned, with four two-light windows in the upper floor, and one three-light window in the ground floor.	II
160 Lowerhouses Lane, Lowerhouses; 53.63431°N 1.76546°W	—	19th century	A stone house in a terrace with a stone slate roof and two storeys. The windows are mullioned, in the upper floor are two two-light windows, and in the ground floor is one three-light window. All the windows have chamfered mullions and lintels.	II
24 Smithy Lane, Moldgreen; 53.64217°N 1.76828°W	—	Mid-19th century	A stone house at the end of a terrace, it has stone gutter brackets, and a stone slate roof. There are two storeys and two bays, and the windows are sashes.	II
38 Smithy Lane, Moldgreen; 53.64194°N 1.76841°W	—	Mid-19th century	A stone house in a terrace, it has stone gutter brackets, and a stone slate roof. There are two storeys and two bays, and the windows are sashes.	II
35 Spring Street, Springwood; 53.64545°N 1.78909°W	—	Mid-19th century	A stone house in a terrace, with a moulded eaves cornice and blocking course, and a slate roof. There are two storeys and two bays. In the ground floor is a canted bay window with chamfered lintels, a moulded cornice and a blocking course. To the left is a doorway with Tuscan pilasters, a moulded cornice and a blocking course. Further to the left is a passage doorway with a chamfered surround and a depressed arch, and in the upper floor are sash windows.	II
43 Spring Street, Springwood; 53.64544°N 1.78932°W	—	Mid-19th century	Originally an Infant School, later used for other purposes, the building is in stone with rusticated quoins, a band, a modillion eaves cornice, and a hipped slate roof. There are two storeys and three bays, and a single-storey bay to the left. The doorway has a segmental pediment on giant brackets and a vermiculated triple keystone. The windows are modern. The bay to the left contains a segmental-headed doorway with rusticated voussoirs and a triple keystone, and above it is an inscribed panel.	II
58 Spring Street, Springwood; 53.64573°N 1.78996°W	—	Mid-19th century	A stone house at the end of a terrace, with a moulded eaves cornice and a slate roof. There are two storeys and two bays. On the ground floor is a canted bay window with panelled aprons, a cornice, a blocking course and a sculpted wreath. To the left is a doorway with Tuscan pilasters, a moulded cornice and a blocking course with a sculpted wreath. The upper floor contains casement windows with moulded surrounds, and the garden is enclosed by ornate cast iron railings.	II
9 and 11 Water Street, Springwood; 53.64517°N 1.79059°W	—	Mid-19th century	A pair of houses at the end of a terrace, in stone, with a moulded eaves cornice and blocking course, and a slate roof. There are two storeys and each house has two bays. The doorways in the right bays have Tuscan three-quarter columns, and each has an oblong fanlight, a moulded cornice, and a blocking course. The windows are sashes, those in the ground floor with a moulded surround, a frieze and a moulded cornice. Between the houses is a round-headed passage doorway with a blind semicircular fanlight, moulded voussoirs and imposts, and a vermiculated keystone.	II
14 and 15 Woodthorpe Terrace, Springwood; 53.64299°N 1.79432°W	—	Mid-19th century	A stone house with a moulded eaves cornice and blocking course, and a slate roof. There are two storeys and a basement, and three bays. The central doorway has three-quarter Tuscan columns, a fluted frieze, and a dentilled segmental pediment, and the windows are sashes with panelled aprons.	II
Chimney, Armitage Bridge Mill; 53.61703°N 1.79993°W	—	Mid-19th century	The chimney is free-standing in a wood, and is joined to the mill by a flue. It is in stone, octagonal and tapering, and contains a bull-nosed string course, above which are sunk panels, and a coved cornice with a blocking course.	II
Tower, Armitage Bridge Mill; 53.61843°N 1.79949°W		Mid-19th century	The tower is in stone, it has four stages diminishing in size, each with a moulded cornice, and a pyramidal lead roof. The second stage has three vertical round-arched panels, the third stage is framed by pilasters, and contains a clock face on each side, and in the top stage are three round-arched louvred openings.	II
Central (Kaye's) College; 53.65131°N 1.79237°W	—	Mid-19th century	The building is in stone with rusticated quoins, a modillioned eaves cornice, a panelled blocking course, and a hipped slate roof with urn finials. There are two storeys and four bays. In the right bay is a two-storey canted bay window with foliate piers. To the left is a porch that has columns with foliage capitals and a full entablature with modillions, and the doorway has a semicircular fanlight, moulded voussoirs and imposts. Above the porch are paired sash windows with a moulded cornice. The windows in the left two bays have moulded surrounds, those in the ground floor with round-arched heads and pediments containing carving.	II
Claremont Hall; 53.65095°N 1.78742°W	—	Mid-19th century	The former tutorial centre is in stone with Tuscan pilasters, a moulded eaves cornice, a blocking course, and a hipped slate roof with raised dies. There are two storeys and five bays. The porch has square Tuscan columns framing Ionic columns, a full entablature, and a blocking course. The doorway contains an oblong fanlight, and the windows are sashes.	II
Northeastern block, Colne Road Mills; 53.63986°N 1.78205°W		Mid-19th century	The mill block, which is in Italianate style, is in stone with quoins, a modillion eaves cornice and blocking course, and a hipped slate roof. There are two storeys and a basement, and a front of 15 bays. Above the three middle bays is a parapet with a moulded cornice and blocking course, and over the outer two bays at each end is a pediment-shaped parapet. Steps with cast iron railings lead up to the doorway that has a Tuscan surround with a full entablature and pediment and a fanlight, and the windows are sashes.	II
Commerce House; 53.64935°N 1.78968°W	—	Mid-19th century	A stone house with a moulded eaves cornice, a blocking course with three pediment-shaped panels, and a hipped slate roof. There are two storeys and three bays. In the centre is a Tuscan porch with an entablature and a blocking course. To the left is an oblong bay window, and to the right a canted bay window, both with Tuscan piers, an entablature and a blocking course. The upper floor contains sash windows in moulded surrounds.	II
Railings and wall, Highfield United Reformed Church; 53.65105°N 1.79156°W	—	Mid-19th century	The wall along the front of the church is in stone. On the wall are elaborate cast iron railings and square piers with plain caps. The gate piers are cylindrical with cornices and plain caps, and are surmounted by cast iron torchères.	II
Lych gate, inner gates, gate piers and lamp post, Holy Trinity Church; 53.65003°N 1.79203°W		19th century	At the entrance to the churchyard from Trinity Street are four stone gate piers, and at the Wentworth Street entrance is a lych gate. This has a stone plinth, timber superstructure, a slate roof, and crenellated bargeboards. In the churchyard to the east of the chancel is a cast iron lamp post with a fluted column, a spiral fluted bar, and a tapering lamp.	II
King's Villa; 53.64035°N 1.77490°W	—	Mid-19th century	A stone house with a moulded eaves cornice, a parapet with wreaths, and a hipped slate roof. There are two storeys and three bays, the middle bay projecting slightly. The doorway has three-quarter Tuscan columns, an oblong fanlight, an entablature, and a blocking course. This flanked by canted bay windows with angle pilasters, a moulded cornice and a blocking course. The windows are sashes with moulded surrounds.	II
Gate piers, King's Villa; 53.64067°N 1.77537°W	—	Mid-19th century	The gate piers flanking the entrance to the drive are in stone. They are rusticated, and have pilasters and cornices. On the top are caps with anthemion in relief on all four sides.	II
Former Lockwood Baths; 53.63494°N 1.79048°W	—	Mid-19th century	The baths, later used for other purposes, are in stone with a slate roof and one storey. At the centre of the front is a coped gable, and the flanking walls have a moulded cornice and blocking course. The ends project and contain Tuscan pilasters. At the centre is a porch with three Tuscan columns and a pediment, and the doorway has a semicircular fanlight.	II
Barn, Lower Park Farm; 53.61545°N 1.78615°W	—	19th century	The barn is in stone and has a stone slate roof and a lean-to outshut at the rear. The openings include an entry with a semicircular arch, and three oculi in the loft.	II
Parkton Grove; 53.61204°N 1.78694°W	—	19th century	A stone house with band, a moulded eaves cornice, a blocking course, and a hipped roof. There are two storeys, three bays, and a conservatory and an extension to the north. The porch has Tuscan angle pilasters, a full entablature and a blocking course, and the door has a semicircular fanlight. The windows are sashes, and in the extension is a shallow canted bay window.	II
Queen Street South Canal Bridge; 53.64012°N 1.78175°W		Mid-19th century	The bridge carries Queen Street South over the Huddersfield Narrow Canal. It is in stone and consists of a single depressed arch. The bridge has broad tapering piers ending in massive coved caps, a moulded string course, and a parapet with moulded coping and four moulded panels.	II
Spring Bank; 53.64992°N 1.79078°W	—	Mid-19th century	A stone house, later divided, it has a slate roof with coped gables and ornamental cresting. There are two storeys and attics, and a symmetrical front of six bays. The outer bays project, they are gabled, and contain two-storey canted bay windows, and in the gables are spherical triangles with hood moulds. The two middle bays have smaller gables, in the ground floor are three-light windows with cusped heads, colonnettes with Romanesque capitals, and hood moulds. The top floor contains two-light windows with segmental hood moulds. The bays in between contain doorways that have colonnettes with Romanesque capitals, cusped fanlights, and hood moulds.	II
St Patrick's Presbytery; 53.64888°N 1.78772°W		Mid-19th century	The presbytery is in stone, with a string course and an embattled parapet. There are two storeys and four bays, the left bay projecting. In the ground floor is a doorway with a chamfered pointed arch and a square hood mould, and three windows with pointed arches. The other windows are mullioned casements with hood moulds.	II
Wall, St Stephen's Church, Rashcliffe; 53.63745°N 1.79160°W	—	Mid-19th century	Running along the southwest side of the churchyard is a dwarf stone wall with cast iron railings, the main ones with clustered shafts, moulded capitals, and tall spear finials. The wall contains simple stone gate piers with conical caps.	II
Taylor Hill Working Men's Club; 53.62824°N 1.79361°W	—	Mid-19th century	A stone building with an eaves cornice, a blocking course with painted wreaths, and a stone slate roof with coped gables. There are two storeys and three bays. The doorway has Tuscan pilasters, an oblong fanlight, and a full entablature with a blocking course. The windows are sashes with moulded surrounds, and in the ground floor they have cornices and a blocking course.	II
The Fly Boat Public House; 53.64322°N 1.77422°W	—	Mid-19th century	The public house is in stone with a sill band, and a hipped stone slate roof. There are two storeys, sides of one and five bays, and a rounded corner between. The windows are sashes.	II
The Rat and Ratchet Public House; 53.64162°N 1.78523°W	—	Mid-19th century	The public house is in stone, with sill bands, a moulded eaves cornice, a blocking course, and a hipped stone slate roof. There are three storeys and two bays. The doorway has a moulded surround and a semicircular fanlight, the windows are sashes, and the ground floor has a canted corner with an ogee corbel above.	II
Twin Trees; 53.65104°N 1.79268°W	—	Mid-19th century	A stone house with a slate roof, ridge tiles, and gables with bargeboards and finials. There are two storeys and an attic, and three bays. The central porch has traceried sidelights, and a gable with bargeboards and a finial. The outer bays have coped gables, and contain, in the ground floor, three-light mullioned windows with traceried heads and chamfered surrounds, and in the upper floor, two-light mullioned windows with moulded surrounds. On the south front is a shallow canted bay window, and in the attic is a gabled dormer with a finial.	II
Former waterworks buildings 53.64571°N 1.79019°W	—	Mid-19th century	The wall at the entrance to the buildings is in stone, with six rusticated pilasters, a moulded eaves cornice and a blocking course. The wall contains a segment-headed carriage entry with moulded imposts, rusticated voussoirs, and a vermiculated keystone.	II
Willow Cottage; 53.62307°N 1.77822°W	—	19th century (probable)	A stone house with a stone slate roof and two storeys. The windows have two lights and are mullioned, with two in the upper floor and one in the ground floor.	II
St Thomas' Church, Lower Fold; 53.64239°N 1.79235°W		1857–59	The church, designed by George Gilbert Scott, is built in stone with slate roofs. It consists of a nave, north and south aisles, a south porch, a chancel with a north chapel and vestry and a south organ recess and sacristy, and a southwest steeple. The steeple has a four stage tower and a broach spire with gabled lucarnes. On the sides of the church at the junctions of the nave and chancel are octagonal stair towers with conical roofs.	II*
St Stephen's Church, Rashcliffe; 53.63766°N 1.79141°W		1863–64	The church is built in sandstone, it has slate roofs, and is in Decorated style. The church has a cruciform plan, consisting of a nave, a south porch, north and south transepts, a chancel with a northeast vestry, and a steeple in the angle of the chancel and the south transept. The steeple has a three-stage tower, with buttresses, a southwest turret, and a tall broach spire. In the transepts are rose windows, and the east window has four lights.	II
Firth Street Block, Commercial Mills; 53.64035°N 1.77926°W		1864	The block is in stone, with stone gutter brackets, and a slate roof with coped gables. There are three storeys, 38 bays along Firth Street and four on Commercial Street. The windows in the ground floor are round-arched with vermiculated voussoirs and a continuous moulded impost band. In the centre is a taller entrance tower with two storeys, a moulded and bracketed cornice and a hipped roof. This contains a round-arched entrance with a chamfered surround, jambs and voussoirs, and over it is an inscribed frieze, a moulded cornice, and a pediment-shaped blocking course. Above this is a pair of segmental-headed sash windows in a segmental headed panel.	II
Firth Street Mills; 53.64097°N 1.77847°W	—	1865–66	The mill buildings were extended in 1886, and converted for university use in about 1995. They consist of a spinning shed, an engine house, a coal store, a boiler house and chimney, and weaving sheds, and are built in stone with slate roofs. The main building has six storeys, fronts of 21 bays, sides of four bays, dentilled eaves and double-ridged hipped roofs. On the south side is a stair tower and taking-in doors. The weaving sheds have one storey and seven coped gables. The chimney at the east is hexagonal and tapering with a moulded cornice at the top.	II
Larchfield Mills; 53.64172°N 1.77761°W	—	1865–66	The mill buildings were extended in about 1880, and converted for university use in 1997–98. They consist of a spinning mill with weaving sheds, and are built in stone with slate roofs. The mill building has hipped roofs with dentilled eaves, five storeys and 16 bays. The windows in the lower two floors have segmental heads, and on the south front is a stair tower. The weaving shed has two storeys and a basement, and nine coped gables with four windows in each gable.	II
Archway, Albion Mills; 53.64124°N 1.78375°W		1867	The archway at the entrance to the mill is in stone, and consists of a semicircular arch with moulded voussoirs, moulded imposts a keystone, and sunk panels in the spandrels. Above it is a cornice, and an inscribed plaque flanked by scrolls. The entrance is paved with stone setts.	II
81 Lockwood Road, Lockwood; 53.63695°N 1.79016°W		1870	A stone house with a moulded eaves cornice and blocking course, and a stone slate roof. There are two storeys and three bays. The central doorway has a Tuscan surround, a fanlight, an entablature, and a blocking course. To the right is a canted bay window with segmental-headed lights, moulded imposts, and a moulded cornice, and the windows are sashes.	II
Albert Mill; 53.63630°N 1.78974°W		1871	The mill is in stone with an impost band, a sill band, a modillion eaves cornice, and a stone slate roof. The main block has three storeys and 15 bays, the windows in the ground floor with round-arched heads, voussoirs, and keystones. To the left is an entrance bay flanked by giant rusticated pilasters surmounted by urns and a semicircular inscribed panel. The bay contains a semicircular archway with a moulded surround and a vermiculated keystone, above which are two oculi with keystones, and a pair of round-arched windows with a central colonnette, moulded voussoirs on consoles, and keystones. To the north is a single-storey extension with ten bays, and at the south end is a parapet.	II
Longley New Hall; 53.63841°N 1.77061°W	—	1871–75	A large house designed by W. H. Crossland and later a school, it is built in sandstone, and has quoins and a blue slate roof. The house is mainly in two storeys with attics, and it has a complex plan, with features including gables with kneelers and ball finials, embattled parapets, and a portico with a round arched entrance. The windows are mullioned sashes, and there is a curved staircase window.	II
Newsome Mills; 53.63009°N 1.78418°W	—	19th century	The mill, which was damaged by fire in 2016, is in stone, with a triple-depth plan, 16 bays along the front, and six bays on the sides. The tower to the northwest has six storeys and is surmounted by a water tank. In the lower four storeys are pairs of windows with voussoirs and keystones. On the fifth floor are angle pilasters and a full entablature, and it contains clock faces with moulded voussoirs and ornamental spandrels.	II
Ramsden Building; 53.64293°N 1.78044°W		1881–83	Originally a technical college, it was expanded in 1896–1900, and later became part of the University of Huddersfield. It is built in stone, with string courses, sill bands, a bracketed eaves cornice, an openwork parapet, and a hipped slate roof. There are three storeys and nine bays. In the centre is a porch with diagonal buttresses, colonnettes, a bracketed eaves cornice and an openwork balustrade with finials. Flanking the middle bay and at the corners are corbelled-out octagonal tourelles with gabled tops and octagonal spires. In the third and seventh bay are full-height bay windows, oblong in the ground floor and canted above with hipped roofs and iron finials. The windows are casements with transoms, and some also with mullions. In the roof are four triangular lucarnes, and on the ridge is an octagonal lantern with an open arcade, gables, a tiled flèche and an iron finial.	II
30 Greenfield Road; 53.64644°N 1.79586°W	—	1882–83	A large house, at one time a school, it was extended in 1913. It is in stone with a moulded eaves cornice on console brackets, a hipped slate roof, and two storeys. On the entrance front is a doorway with a carved surround, a semicircular fanlight, spandrels and a keystone. Above it is a balustrade with urns, and to the right is a two-storey canted bay window. Further to the right, the extension contains a porte-cochère, above which is a mullioned and transomed oriel bow window. The garden front contains a two-storey bay window, and the other windows are sashes.	II
Gate piers and gates, 30 Greenfield Road; 53.64627°N 1.79547°W	—	c. 1882	There are two pairs of stone gate piers at the entrance to the drive. They are square, and have elaborately carved tops and moulded tapering caps. The gates are in iron.	II
Milton Congregational Chapel Sunday School; 53.64258°N 1.78002°W	—	1883	The school, later used for other purposes, is in stone with a slate roof, two storeys and a complex plan. On the front, from the right are a canted bay with a hipped roof containing an entrance with a pointed arch and a pierced parapet above; then two gabled bays; a bay with a doorway flanked by window, all with pointed heads, and above a hipped dormer; and to the left a taller range with a five-light window.	II
Milton Congregational Church; 53.64258°N 1.78060°W		1883–85	The church, later used for other purposes, is in stone with a slate roof. It consists of a nave with a clerestory, north and south aisles, north and south transepts, and a northwest tower. The tower has five stages, a stair tower with an octagonal pyramidal roof, an eaves cornice, and a parapet. At the west end of the church is an entrance with a pointed arch, over which is a coped gable with crockets, a large three-light window, and a gable with a cross finial. The west front is flanked by octagonal turrets with pyramidal roofs.	II
Victoria Tower; 53.62226°N 1.77226°W		1897–99|	The tower, which was built on Castle Hill to commemorate the Golden Jubilee of Queen Victoria, is in stone, and is nearly 100 feet (30 m) high. The tower has machicolations and an embattled parapet, and it contains single-light windows. Corbelled-out on the northeast corner is a higher stair tower, also with an embattled parapet.	II
St Paul's Drill Hall; 53.64249°N 1.77909°W	—	1899–1901	The drill hall is in limestone, with a cement slate roof and ridge tiles. It consists of an administrative block with a dining room to the right, a drill hall at the rear, and a rear cross wing. The front block has two storeys and five bays on a plinth. The middle bay projects slightly under a crow-stepped gable, and to the left is a tourelle. The gable contains a plaque with the regimental coat of arms. Beneath this is a mullioned and transomed window, and in the ground floor is an arched entrance. The flanking bays are gabled, and the outer bays have embattled parapets and tourelles; both contain mullioned and transomed windows. The dining room has a single storey and three bays.	II
Statue of King Edward VII; 53.64841°N 1.78836°W		1912	The statue of King Edward VII is in the forecourt of the previous Infirmary, and was made by P. Bryant Baker. It is in bronze, and consists of a life-size standing figure of the king wearing the regalia of the Order of the Garter. The figure stands on a square granite plinth with bronze plaques on each side and an inscription on the front.	II
Former Maternity Ward (Block 2), Princess Royal Community Hospital; 53.64639°N 1.79115°W	—	1928	The former maternity block is in stone, with roofs of grey-green slate, and half-timbered gables with bargeboards and ball finials, and it is in Arts and Crafts style. There is a single storey, a main range of nine bays, cross-wing pavilions, and toilet blocks at the rear. The middle bay is canted, and contains a doorway, and in the outer bays are sash windows. In the middle of the main roof and on the pavilions are decorative cupolas.	II
