= St Patrick's Church, Huddersfield =

Roman Catholic Church in Huddersfield, West Yorkshire, England

St Patrick's Church
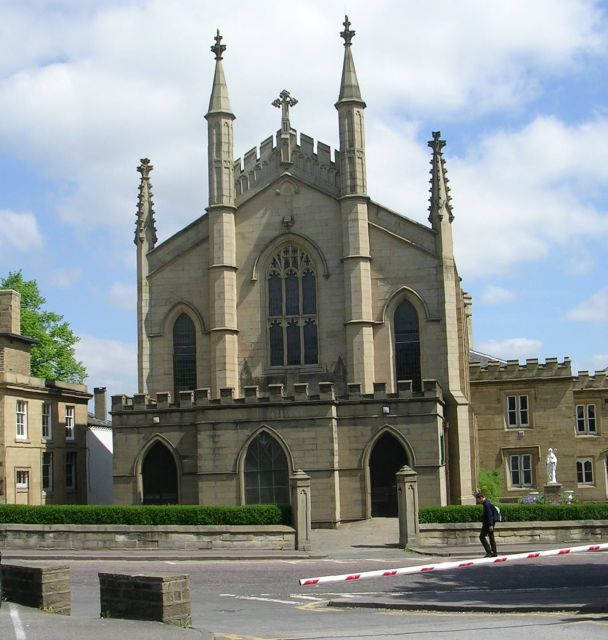
- St Patrick's Church
- 53.6490°N 1.7879°W
- OS grid reference: SE 14115 16961
- Location: Huddersfield
- Country: England
- Denomination: Roman Catholic
- Website: HolyRedeemerParish.co.uk

History
- Status: Active
- Dedication: Saint Patrick

Architecture
- Functional status: Parish church
- Heritage designation: Grade II listed
- Designated: 3 March 1952
- Architect: Joseph Kaye
- Style: Gothic Revival
- Completed: 26 September 1832

Administration
- Province: Liverpool
- Diocese: Leeds
- Deanery: Huddersfield
- Parish: Holy Redeemer

St Patrick's Church is a Roman Catholic church in Huddersfield, West Yorkshire. It serves the Parish of the Holy Redeemer in the Deanery of Huddersfield, in the Diocese of Leeds.

Built in 1832 for use as a parish church, it was designed by Joseph Kaye, an architect from Bradford. It is situated on the junction between New North Road and Castlegate in the centre of the town. It is a Grade II listed building.

== History ==
=== Construction ===
In 1831, land for the church was leased from a local family, the Ramsdens. Construction began that year and the church was designed by Joseph Kaye of Huddersfield (1783-1858). On 26 September 1832, the church was opened.

=== Decoration ===
In 1874, the interior was redecorated. That year, a new stained-glass windows was installed in the sanctuary of the church. In 1889, new seating was put into the church as well as a new organ.

In 1962, reordering of the church took place. A new porch was added, and a new altar and reredos were installed. More reordering followed with the side altars being later removed and lectern and font being added. From 1980 to 1981, the exterior of the church was cleaned.

In 1982 the church was reordered and a new altar, ambo, font and tabernacle pedestal, made from locally quarried stone, were installed. In 2009 a new organ was installed - the first to be specifically built for the church.

== Parish ==
In 2007, the parishes of St Patrick's; Holy Family, Slaithwaite in the west; and Our Lady of Lourdes, Sheepridge in the east of the town, together with those of Saint James and Saint Brigid (whose churches were closed) were merged to become the Parish of the Holy Redeemer.

There are three Sunday Masses at St Patrick's Church: 5.30 pm on Saturday evening and 11 am and 5 pm on Sunday. Our Lady of Lourdes Church has one Sunday Mass at 10.15 am on Sunday morning. Holy Family Church has one Sunday Mass at 9 am.

== See also ==
- Listed buildings in Huddersfield (Newsome Ward - outer areas)
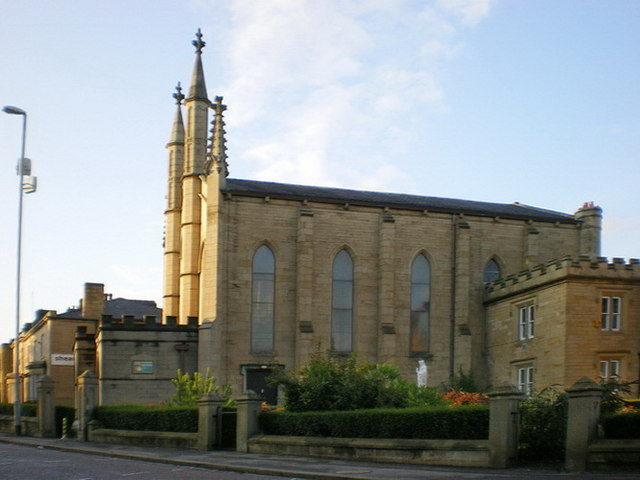
Church and presbytery

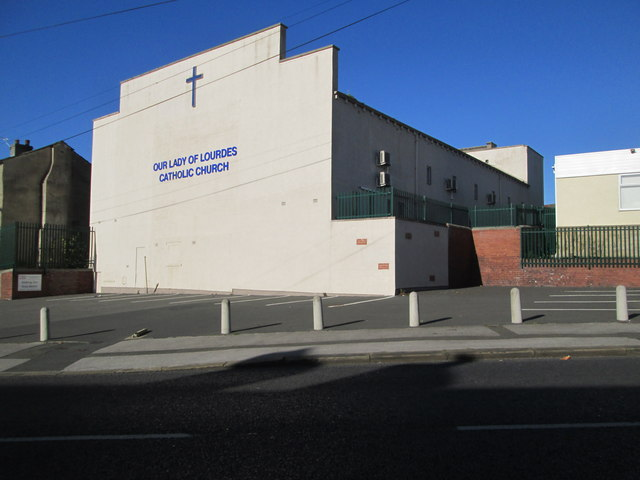
Our Lady of Lourdes Church, Sheepridge
