= Holy Trinity Church, Huddersfield =

Anglican church in Huddersfield, Yorkshire

Holy Trinity Church
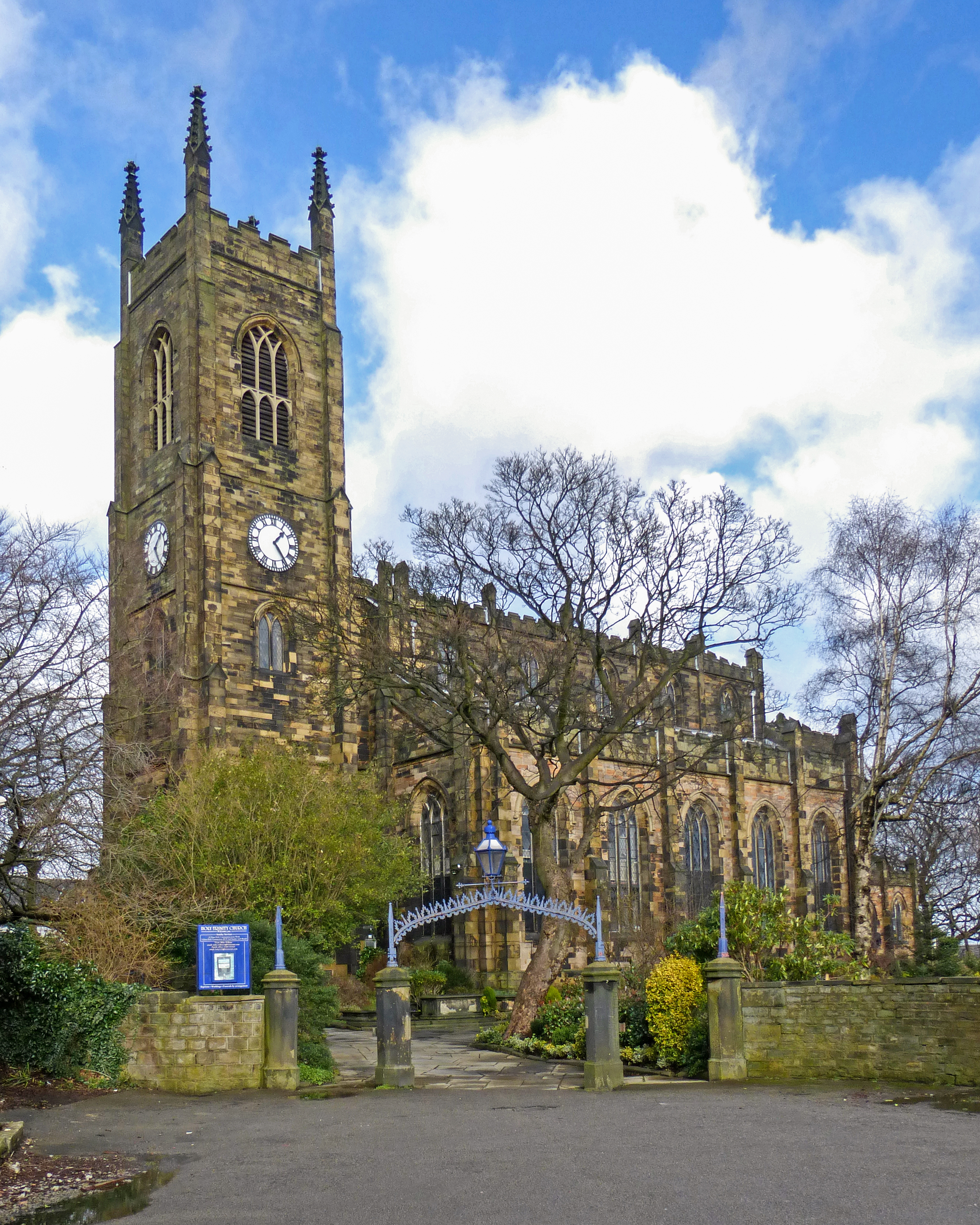
- The church viewed from Trinity Street
- Holy Trinity Church
- 53.649938°N 1.793052°W
- OS grid reference: SE 13781 17062
- Location: Huddersfield
- Country: England
- Denomination: Anglican

History
- Status: Parish church

Architecture
- Functional status: Active
- Heritage designation: Grade II*
- Architect: Thomas Taylor
- Groundbreaking: 1816
- Completed: 1819

Administration
- Province: York
- Diocese: Leeds
- Archdeaconry: Halifax
- Deanery: Huddersfield

Holy Trinity Church is a Church of England parish church in the town of Huddersfield, West Yorkshire, England. It opened in 1819 and is a grade II* listed building. The church is situated just off Trinity Street, named after the church and forming part of the main A640 road from Huddersfield to Rochdale, and is just outside the town centre, in the suburb of Marsh. The parish forms part of the diocese of Leeds.

== History ==
In the early 19th century the town of Huddersfield was growing rapidly as a result of the Industrial Revolution and the town's parish church was too small to cope. To address this, Holy Trinity was built between 1816 and 1819 as a chapel of ease, and consecrated in 1820. The new church was funded by Benjamin Haigh Allen, a local banker, and designed by the architect Thomas Taylor of Leeds.

Benjamin Haigh Allen invited Henry Maddock (1781-1826) to be Holy Trinity's first Perpetual Curate. Maddock met Allen during a preaching tour he gave in 1814 along with the Revd. Legh Richmond, on behalf of the Church Mission Society.

Holy Trinity became a parish church in its own right in 1857, serving Marsh and the adjoining suburbs of Edgerton and Springwood.

== See also ==
- Listed buildings in Huddersfield (Newsome Ward - outer areas)

== Bibliography ==
- Webster, Christopher (2012), "'Foremost among those who successfully promoted the ancient style of architecture': the churches of Thomas Taylor (1777/8–1826)", in Webster, Christopher (ed.), Episodes in the Gothic Revival: six church architects, Spire Studies in Architectural History, vol. 1, Reading: Spire Books, ISBN 978-1-904965-34-3
