= St Thomas's Church, Huddersfield =

Parish church in Huddersfield, West Yorkshire, England

Coordinates: 53.642340°N 1.792330°W

St Thomas's Church
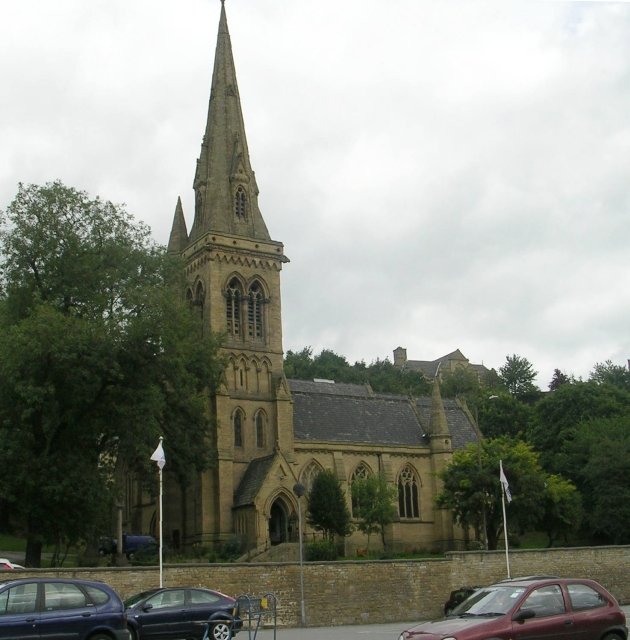
- St Thomas's Church
- OS grid reference: SE 13829 16225
- Country: England
- Denomination: Anglican
- Tradition: Anglo-Catholic

History
- Dedication: St Thomas

Administration
- Province: York
- Diocese: Diocese of Leeds

Clergy
- Bishop: Rt Revd Stephen Race SSC (AEO)

St Thomas's Church is a Church of England church in the Diocese of Leeds. It is situated in Huddersfield, West Yorkshire, England and is a Grade II* listed building. The church was designed by Sir George Gilbert Scott and built between 1857 and 1859. It was consecrated in 1859 and celebrated its 150th anniversary in 2009.

== Tradition ==
St Thomas's stands in the Modern Catholic tradition of the Church of England. As the parish rejects the ordination of women, it receives alternative episcopal oversight from the Bishop of Beverley (currently Stephen Race).

== See also ==
- Listed buildings in Huddersfield (Newsome Ward - outer areas)
