= Longley, Huddersfield =

Area of Huddersfield, West Yorkshire, England

Coordinates: 53.631°N 1.769°W

Longley
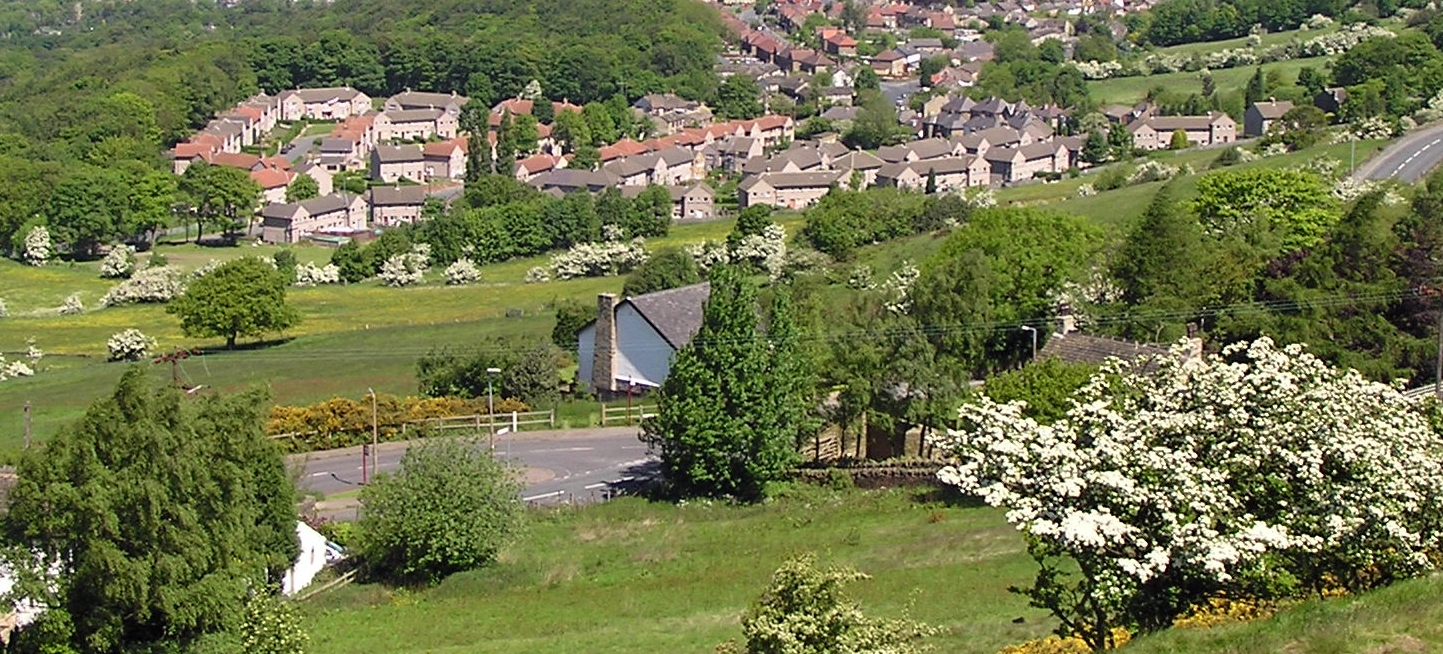
- Longley viewed from Castle Hill

- Location within West Yorkshire
- Metropolitan borough: Kirklees
- Metropolitan county: West Yorkshire
- Region: Yorkshire and the Humber
- Country: England
- Sovereign state: United Kingdom
- Police: West Yorkshire
- Fire: West Yorkshire
- Ambulance: Yorkshire

Longley is an area of Huddersfield, in the Kirklees district, in West Yorkshire, England, between Newsome and Lowerhouses. It is mainly made up of woodland and a nine-hole golf course (Longley Park). Longley Old Hall, a listed building, is also in the area.

== See also ==
- Listed buildings in Huddersfield (Newsome Ward – outer areas)
