= Boswens Menhir =

Standing stone near St. Just in Penwith, Cornwall, England

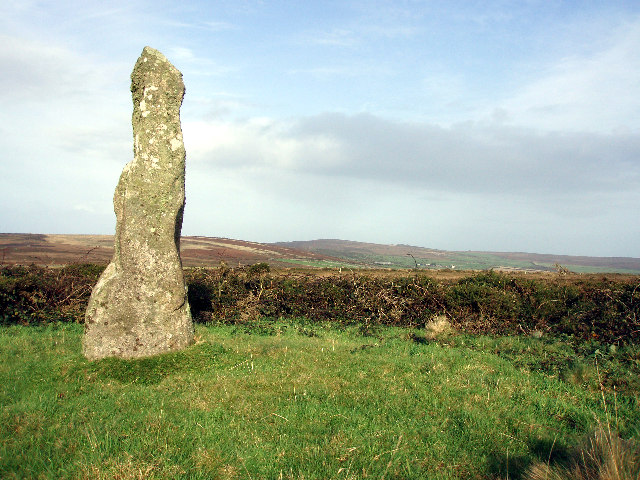

- Location within Southwest Cornwall
- 50.13904°N 5.63989°W
- Type: Standing stone
- Periods: Neolithic / Bronze Age
- Location: Cornwall

Boswens Menhir (grid reference SW400328), also known as Boswens standing stone, or the Long Stone, is a standing stone 3 kilometres northeast of St Just in Penwith, in Cornwall, England.

The menhir is featured in Mark Jenkin's 2022 film Enys Men.

== Location ==
The stone lies to the west of Boswens Common, and can be seen from the B3318 road. It is one of many standing stones in Penwith.

It is 1.5 km east of Tregeseal stone circle, and about 1 km south of Chûn Quoit.

== Description ==
The stone is of rectangular section measuring 0.7 metres by 0.9 metres, and is 2.4 metres high. The front face is symmetrical; at the back there are two steps which reduce the width by half.

In 1754 William Borlase illustrated the stone standing in a small low cairn, but by 1861 there was "hardly any trace of cairn" visible. The cairn today is around 0.3 metres high, and is "only just noticeable". The cairn may be the remains of a barrow.
