= Longstone (band) =

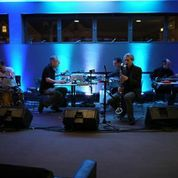
- Longstone live 2011

Background information
- Origin: Cheltenham, England
- Genres: Experimental, electronic, space rock, alternative rock
- Years active: 1996–present
- Labels: Ochre, Space Age Recordings, Enraptured Records, Wavetable
- Members: Mike Ward, Mike Cross
- Website: www.longstoned.co.uk Longstone videos @ Wavetable

Longstone are an experimental, electronic music collective formed in 1996 in Cheltenham, England. It is led by Mike Ward and Mike Cross.

== History ==
Longstone were formed during 1996 by Mike Cross and Mike Ward in Cheltenham, England. Longstone released their debut album, Surrounded By Glass, on the Ochre label in 1997. That same year, the band appeared at the CMJ music festival in New York; the performance was recorded and later released in 1998 as the Live in New York 10" mini album. The band's second studio album, Auto//:Genous, was released on former Spacemen 3 member Sonic Boom's U.K.-based Space Age Recordings label and featured Echo & the Bunnymen guitarist Will Sergeant and the Christians' Henry Priestman guesting on marimba. Longstone's fourth release for Ochre was Static, which was issued in 2001. Its fifth full-length, L.I.F.E.span, was a sound collage that blended analog synths and electronic toys with found sounds, live recordings, samples, and acoustic instruments. The Rmeixes (sic) and Kabuki albums were released in 2007 and 2008 respectively along with an edit of Kabuki also making it onto the Wire Tapper 17 CD - part of a series of CDs released by The Wire magazine. In 2009 Longstone performed a live re-score for Osbert Parkers BAFTA nominated short film Film Noir as part of the Future Shorts Festival in Brixton, London.

In 2011 Ward and Cross formed the Wavetable record label. The label is a vehicle for further Longstone releases along with releases for other, like minded musicians. To date two Longstone albums have been released on Wavetable (Sakura 2011 and Pavilion 2012) as well as Flying Down Trio's, Sheffield and Robson and Wilding's, Chapel Songs.

When Longstone perform live, the duo of Cross and Ward are joined by Chris Cundy (Guillemots, Gannets, Cold Specks), Stuart Wilding (Keith Tippett, Lol Coxhill) and Kev Fox (90 Degrees South, Brickwerk). Will Sergeant has also occasionally assisted. Longstone have also collaborated with Paul Simpson of Skyray (ex-Teardrop Explodes and Wild Swans) and both Ward and Cross have participated in a Welsh-based collective called the Serpents (along with Sergeant and various members of Gorky's Zygotic Mynci, Super Furry Animals, Skyray, Land of Nod, and others). A performance at the Cheltenham Jazz Festival in 2009 also saw Longstone joined by Dutch improvisational cellist and long time Werner Herzog collaborator Ernst Reijseger

== Musical style ==
Longstone's music is often described as being directly influenced by early-'70s Krautrock bands (Cluster, Neu!, Kraftwerk), as well as more recent Teutonic artists, including To Rococo Rot, and Kreidler. Descriptions like these usually tend to forget Longstone's avant-rock side or its wide range of Space rock and shoegazer influences, especially My Bloody Valentine and Experimental Audio Research. There is also a strong improvised element to Longstone's sound, particularly in a live context. Later releases and performances have seen the electronic backbone of the sound augmented with more acoustic flavours including woodwind and found percussion.

== Discography ==
=== Studio albums ===
Album title	Year	Label
Surrounded By Glass	1998	Ochre
Auto//:Genous	1999	Space Age Recordings
Static	2001	Ochre
Archive	2002	Ochre
L.I.F.E Span	2003	Blackbean and Placenta
Longstone Rmeixes	2007	Elbandito Recordings
Kabuki	2008	Ochre
Sakura	2011	Wavetable
Pavilion	2012	Wavetable
Risaikuru	2014	Linear Obsessional Recordings
Kinematic	2021	Wavetable
Risaikuru 2022 deluxe reissue	2022	Wavetable

=== Live albums ===
Album title	Year	Label
Risaikuru Live 2015	2016	Wavetable

=== Singles and EPs ===
Title	Year	Label
Longstone/Stylus split 10"	1997	Ochre
Live In New York. 10"	1998	Ochre
Longstone/Electroscope 7"	1999	Oggum

=== Compilation albums ===
Title	Year	Label
Hope	1998	Audio Research Editions "Where There's L.I.F.E There's hope"
Trace	1999	Audio Research Editions "Auto//:Stirling//:Trace
Through The Square Window	1999	Blue Flea "Convex Structure Pt3"
Bedroom Ambience 2	1999	Enraptured "Water Resistant"
Zero	2000	Audio Research Editions "LSB"
Interface	2000	Space Age Recordings "Auto://Trophic"
271199	2000	Ochre "Living Space"
Yr Agog	2000	Oggum "Glacial Funk"
FMCD (JUNE)	2000	Future Music Magazine "Auto://Rotation"
Ochre 7 Festival	2001	Ochre "Traffic"
Blackbean's Dirty Little Secret	2002	Blackbean and Placenta "Access Denied"
Themes	2002	Ochre "L.I.F.E Span"
Seasons	2003	Ochre "Cherry Blossom"
This Side Up	2005	Ptolemic Terrascope "Indochine"
The Wire Tapper 17	2007	Wire Magazine "Kabuki"Wire Magazine "Kabuki"
The Wire Tapper 37	2015	Wire Magazine "Risaikuru - Onagawa (soil machine edit)"
