= Long Common =

Hamlet in Hampshire, England

Coordinates: 50.933333°N 1.283333°W

- Location within Hampshire
- OS grid reference: SU5045815120
- District: Winchester
- Shire county: Hampshire
- Region: South East
- Country: England
- Sovereign state: United Kingdom
- Post town: SOUTHAMPTON
- Postcode district: SO32
- Dialling code: 01962
- Police: Hampshire and Isle of Wight
- Fire: Hampshire and Isle of Wight
- Ambulance: South Central
- UK Parliament: Eastleigh

Long Common is a hamlet in the civil parish of Botley in the Eastleigh district of Hampshire, England. It lies approximately 5.6 miles (9 km) north-east from Southampton.
