= Looe Mills =

Hamlet in Cornwall, England

Coordinates: 50°27′15″N 4°29′26″W

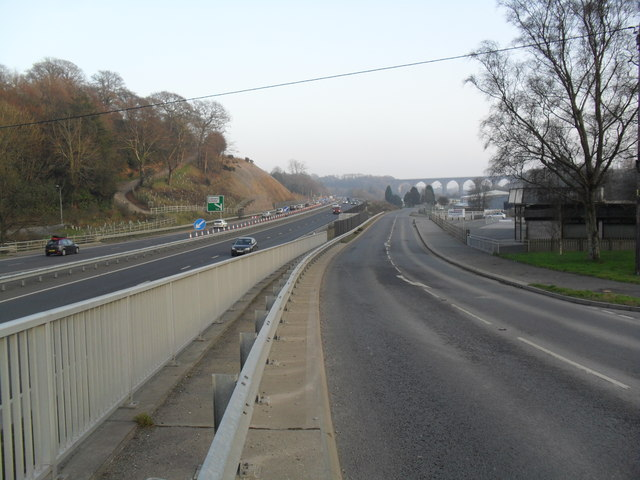
Looe Mills

Looe Mills or Looemills is a hamlet in Cornwall, England. It is on the A38 road between Liskeard and Dobwalls. According to the Post Office the population at the 2011 census was included in the civil parish of Dobwalls and Trewidland.
