= Londubh =

Coordinates: 57.76893°N 5.59751°W

Londubh: Scottish Gaelic: An Lòn Dubh
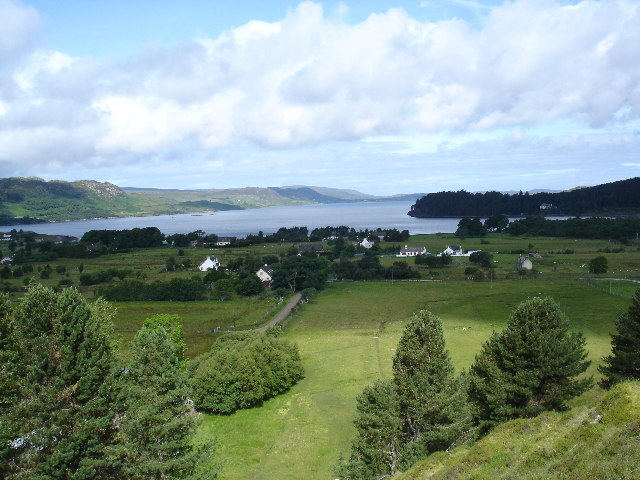
- Looking North-East down the main Londubh road, at the croft in fields from the common grazing. Loch Ewe in the background.

- Location within the Ross and Cromarty area
- OS grid reference: NG861811
- Council area: Highland
- Country: Scotland
- Sovereign state: United Kingdom
- Postcode district: IV22 2
- Police: Scotland
- Fire: Scottish
- Ambulance: Scottish

Londubh (Scottish Gaelic: An Lòn Dubh) is a village on the south shore of Loch Ewe in Poolewe, Ross-shire, Scottish Highlands and is in the Scottish council area of Highland. The village of Poolewe lies directly to the south along the A832 road.
