= Lowerhouses =

Area of Huddersfield, West Yorkshire, England

Coordinates: 53°38′02″N 1°45′59″W

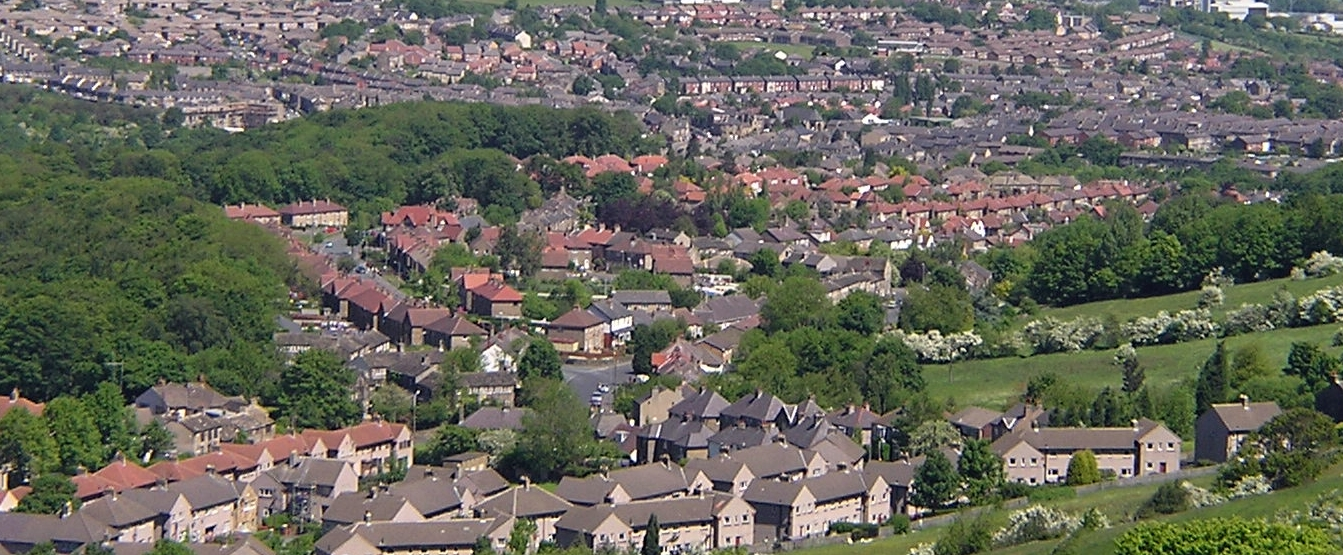
Lowerhouses viewed from Castle Hill, Huddersfield

Lowerhouses is a residential district in the town of Huddersfield, Kirklees, West Yorkshire, England.

Lowerhouses is a residential district situated in a wooded hillside, adjacent to Hall Bower, between Newsome and Almondbury, approximately 1 mile (1.6 km) of Huddersfield town centre. It comprises multiple social housing estates, with a mixture of private housing throughout.

It has a primary school, local corner shop, church and a take-away.

== See also ==
- Listed buildings in Huddersfield (Newsome Ward - outer areas)
