= Longmanhill =

Coordinates: 57°39′N 2°26′W

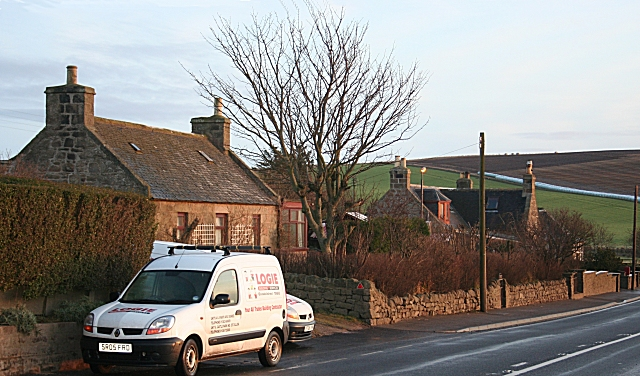

Longmanhill is a settlement in the Aberdeenshire parish of Gamrie; it is located along the A98 road connecting Fraserburgh to Macduff. This hamlet was founded in the year 1822 by the Earl of Fife. Nearby is a prehistoric cairn, the eponymous Longman Hill.

== See also ==
- Burn of Myrehouse
