= Longcroft, Cumbria =

Settlement in Cumbria, England

Coordinates: 54.912°N 3.226°W

Longcroft
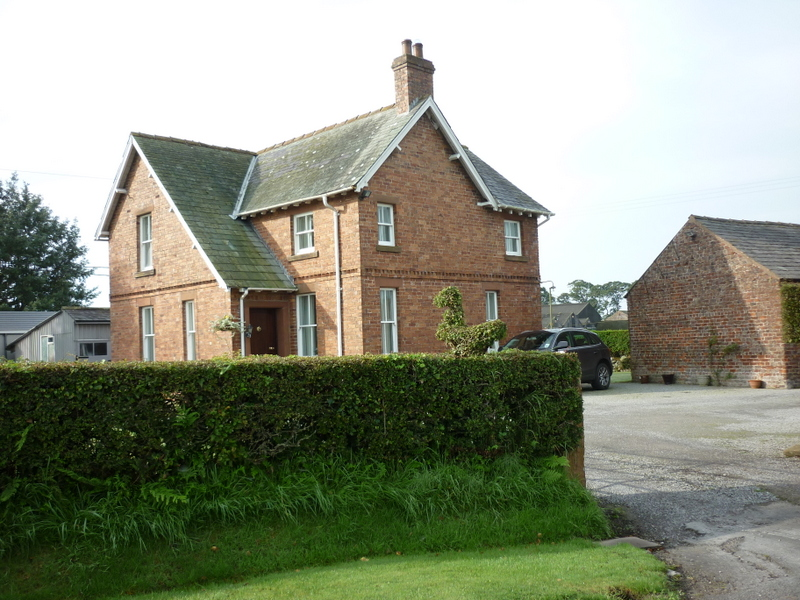
- A house in Longcroft

- Location in Allerdale, Cumbria Location within Cumbria
- OS grid reference: NY214581
- Civil parish: Bowness
- Unitary authority: Cumberland
- Ceremonial county: Cumbria
- Region: North West
- Country: England
- Sovereign state: United Kingdom
- Post town: WIGTON
- Postcode district: CA7
- Dialling code: 016973
- Police: Cumbria
- Fire: Cumbria
- Ambulance: North West
- UK Parliament: Penrith and Solway

Longcroft is a small community in Cumbria, England, nestled in between Kirkbride and Anthorn. The village contains only five houses, one of which is Longcroft Farm, a dairy farm. The marsh at the bottom of the lands has been used in film documentaries, as it is the only place in Cumbria where there is not "background pollution".

Isold Isabel de Longcroft (born about 1107, Longcroft, Cumbria) wed, in 1128, Lord Odard de Loges (a.k.a. Logis; born 1095, Highlands, Scotland), who was made Earl of Wigton by King Henry I, fourth son of William the Conqueror. The couple had two sons, Baron Adam de Wigton (born Wigton, Cumbria, 1129 - died around 1208) and Baron Gilbert de Wigton (born Wigton, Cumbria, about 1130 – died about 1190).

The de Wigton and de Kirkbride families intermarried in 1286, when Sir Richard de Kirkbride married Christina de Wigton in Kirkbride, Cumbria; the couple had two sons:

- Walter de Kirkbride (1287–1336), who married Alice de Bourdon in 1313
- John de Kirkbride (1295–1327)

The extremely distant descendants of the Kirkbrides would eventually emigrate across the pond to the New World and help establish the American city of Trenton, New Jersey, the capital of the State of New Jersey.
