= Springwood, Huddersfield =

Area in Huddersfield, West Yorkshire, England

Coordinates: 53.644°N 1.790°W

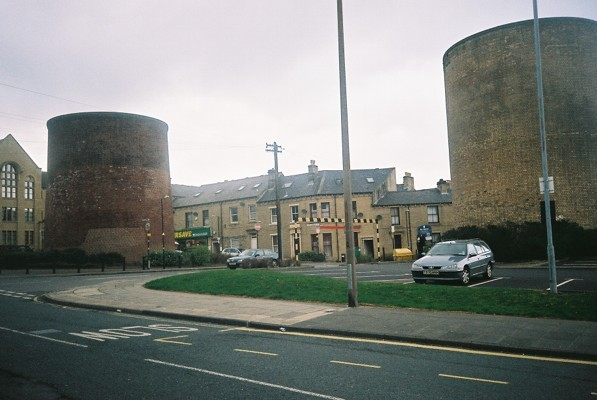
Springwood Air Shafts from Merton Street

Springwood is a district of Huddersfield, West Yorkshire, England.

It is immediately to the west of Huddersfield town centre and stretches as far as the town's Greenhead Park.

There is a large 800 space car park which is used by workers and shoppers to the town centre. It is a buffer between the Springwood's housing and the town centre.

The Huddersfield and Penistone railway lines run underneath Springwood and two giant ventilation shafts overlook the area built as an outlet for smoke from steam trains from the early days of rail.

== See also ==
- Listed buildings in Huddersfield (Newsome Ward - outer areas)
