= Longley (surname) =

Longley is a surname, and may refer to:

- Avard Longley (1823–1884), Canadian politician from Nova Scotia; served in the House of Commons 1878–82
- Bernard Longley (born 1955), English archbishop of Birmingham since 2009
- Bill Longley (gunfighter) (1851–1878), American outlaw and gunfighter in the Old West
- Bill Longley (speedway rider) (born 1914), Australian speedway rider
- Blair Longley (b. 1950), Canadian politician and marijuana activist
- Charles Thomas Longley (1794–1868), British Anglican Church priest; Archbishop of York; Archbishop of Canterbury 1862–68
- Clifford Longley, English journalist and author.
- Clint Longley (born 1952), American professional football player
- Edna Longley (born 1940), Northern Irish literary critic
- Harry Sherman Longley (1868–1944), Episcopal bishop in the United States
- James B. Longley, Jr. (born 1951), American politician from Maine; U.S. representative 1995–97; son of James B. Longley (governor)
- James B. Longley (1924–1980), American politician from Maine; governor of Maine 1975–79
- James Longley (filmmaker), American documentary filmmaker
- James Wilberforce Longley (1849–1922), Canadian journalist, judge, and politician; served in the Nova Scotia legislature
- Jim Longley (born 1958), Australian accountant and politician; served in the New South Wales legislature 1986–96
- John Longley (1867–1953), British Army officer
- John B. Longley (1830–1892), American lawyer and politician
- Luc Longley (born 1969), Australian professional basketball player
- Michael Longley (1939–2025), Northern Ireland poet
- Mitch Longley (born 1965), American film and television actor
- Sarah Longley (born 1975) Northern Irish painter
- Thomas James Longley (born 1989), British actor
- Ty Longley (1971–2003), American guitarist and singer in the band Great White
- Vicky Longley (born 1988), British actress
- Victoria Longley (Australian actress) (born 1987), Australian actress
