= Listed buildings in Pool-in-Wharfedale =

Pool is a civil parish in the metropolitan borough of the City of Leeds, West Yorkshire, England. The parish contains twelve listed buildings that are recorded in the National Heritage List for England. All the listed buildings are designated at Grade II, the lowest of the three grades, which is applied to "buildings of national importance and special interest". The parish contains the conservation village of Pool-in-Wharfedale and the surrounding countryside. Most of the listed buildings are houses and cottages, and the others include a church, a former toll house, a bridge, three mileposts, and a war memorial.

== Buildings ==
Name and location	Photograph	Date	Notes
Pool Farmhouse; 53.90132°N 1.62678°W	—	1725	The farmhouse, later a private house, is in sandstone, with quoins, and a stone slate roof with coped gables and kneelers. There are two storeys, three bays, and a rear outshut. The doorway at the left end has a chamfered surround, and a shaped lintel inscribed with initials and the date. The windows are mullioned, with some mullions missing. Extended to the east c.1960
Pool Hall; 53.90114°N 1.62721°W	—	18th century	A 16th-century farmhouse, later extended at intervals and divided, it is in sandstone with a wing in brick, and stone slate roofs with coped gables. There are two storeys and attics, and an irregular T-shaped plan. The main range has a symmetrical front of three bays, a central doorway with a moulded architrave and a rectangular fanlight, and a semicircular Tuscan porch with a moulded cornice, sash windows, and an embattled parapet. In the attics of two service wings are Venetian windows. Stables and a coach house have been converted and incorporated into the house. (poolinwharfedalehistory.co.uk)
4 and 5 Arthington Lane; 53.90156°N 1.62586°W		Mid to late 18th century	A pair of cottages in sandstone with quoins on the left and a slate roof. There are two storeys, a double-depth plan, and two bays. The openings have raised plain surrounds, with the doorways at the outer ends. The windows are mullioned with three lights, and there is an inserted square window.
Pool Bridge; 53.90524°N 1.63062°W		Late 18th century	The bridge, built in 1754 and later widened in 1815, carries Main Street (A658 road) over the River Wharfe. It is in sandstone and consists of seven segmental arches, two over the river, two to the south, and three to the north. On the east side are recessed arches and triangular cutwaters, and on the west side are rusticated voussoirs and round-nosed cutwaters. On both sides, there is a canted central pier, intermediate rectangular piers, and cylindrical end piers with domed caps, all with vermiculated masonry. poolinwharfedalehistory.co.uk
The Bar House; 53.89480°N 1.63997°W	Old Pool Bank	c. 1780?	A former toll house built in 1847 soon after the Leeds/Otley road was built in 1841 later a private house, it is in stone with a hipped slate roof. There is a single-storey, two bays, a canted south front, and a rear extension. On the front is a sash window, and a doorway with a painted lintel extending over a blocked door on the left. The other windows are casements.
Manor House; 53.90283°N 1.62981°W	—	Early 19th century	A sandstone house with quoins, sill bands, and a slate roof with coped gables. There are two storeys, a double-depth plan, and a symmetrical front of three bays. In the centre is a doorway and a vertical window above, both with plain surrounds, flanked by two-storey bow windows. At the rear is a stair window. Huntingdon Archive records show in 1569 Richard Goldesborough of Goldesbrouth rented to Roger Morrys of High Holborne parish the Manor House of Pool parish for 63/- annual rent. Shown on a map of Pool dated 1756now in Leeds City Archives. (Pool Archives photo shown in www.poolinwharfedalehistory.co.uk)
Penndene; 53.90314°N 1.62927°W	—	Early 19th century	A sandstone house with a sill band, and a slate roof with coped gables and kneelers. There are two storeys, a double-depth plan, and a symmetrical front of three bays. In the centre is a doorway with fluted jambs and head, a three-light fanlight, and a moulded cornice. The windows are sashes with wedge lintels. Photo in www.poolinwharfedalehistory.co.uk
St Wilfrid's Church; 53.90244°N 1.62987°W		1838–40	The church was designed by R. D. Chantrell and the apse added in 1891. It is built in stone with a Welsh slate roof and consists of a west steeple with flanking vestries, a nave, a south porch, and an apsidal chancel. The steeple has a tower with two stages and contains a doorway with a pointed arch, clock faces on the south and east fronts, and is surmounted by an octagonal broach spire. The flanking vestries have hipped roofs, and the porch is gabled. The windows in the church are lancets, and most are paired.
Milepost at SE 241 440; 53.89168°N 1.63455°W		Mid 19th century	The milestone is at the junction of Leeds Road (A660 road) with Pool Bank Road (A658 road). It is in sandstone, about 0.5 metres (1 ft 8 in) high, and has a rectangular section and a segmental top. The front is inscribed with the distances to local churches and other landmarks.
Milepost at SE 235 454; 53.90487°N 1.64297°W		Late 19th century	The milepost is on the south side of Pool Road, (A659 road). It is in sandstone with cast iron overlay, about 1 metre (3 ft 3 in) high, and has a triangular plan, a semicircular head, and chamfered sides. On the top it is inscribed "TADCASTER & OTLEY ROAD POOL" and "POOL", and on the sides are the distances to Harewood, Otley, Wetherby, Boston Spa, and Tadcaster.
Milepost at SE 240 441; 53.89203°N 1.63595°W		Late 19th century	The milepost is on the north side of Leeds Road, (A660 road). It is in sandstone with cast iron overlay, about 1 metre (3 ft 3 in) high, and has a triangular plan, a semicircular head, and chamfered sides. On the top, it is inscribed with the distance to London, and on the sides with the distances to Leeds and Otley.
War memorial 53.90238°N 1.62929°W		1923	The war memorial is in a circular enclosure by a road junction. It is in stone, and in the form of a stepped and tapering cenotaph about 3 metres (9.8 ft) high. This stands on a rectangular base of five steps on a podium. On the memorial are bronze plaques with inscriptions, and the names of those lost in the two World Wars and the Iraq war. The enclosure is paved with concentric stone setts, and has a low wall with semi-round coping.
