= Listed buildings in Shadwell, West Yorkshire =

Shadwell is a civil parish in the metropolitan borough of the City of Leeds, West Yorkshire, England. The parish contains ten listed buildings that are recorded in the National Heritage List for England. All the listed buildings are designated at Grade II, the lowest of the three grades, which is applied to "buildings of national importance and special interest". The parish contains the village of Shadwell and the surrounding area, and the listed buildings consist of houses, a farmhouse and farm buildings, a library, a church and a war memorial.

== Buildings ==
Name and location	Photograph	Date	Notes
125 Main Street; 53.85388°N 1.47907°W		1637	A house, later a shop, it has been altered, and is in gritstone on a chamfered plinth, with a slate roof. There are two storeys and two bays. The original entrance is Tudor arched, and has a lintel carved with initials and the date. There are windows with moulded surrounds and an inserted doorway, all under a moulded stepped hood mould. In the upper floor are two windows, one a sliding sashes, and the other a casement.
Manor Farmhouse, outbuildings, mounting steps, and wall 53.85192°N 1.47776°W	—	1738	The farmhouse, which was altered later, is in stone with a slate roof and coped gables. There are two storeys, four bays, and at the rear are a parallel service wing and outshuts. The house contains one blocked mullioned window, the other windows are sashes, and the doorway has a plain surround and a fanlight. Attached to the house is a coped garden wall about 2 metres (6 ft 7 in) high. At the rear are mounting steps, and outbuildings that are parallel to the house that have quoins and stone roofs, and contain three doors. To the left is a broken gate pier inscribed with initials and the date.
Barn and byre north of Manor Farmhouse; 53.85220°N 1.47784°W		Mid 18th century	The building is in gritstone with quoins and a stone slate roof, and consists of a byre on the left with two storeys and three bays, and an eleven-bay barn to the right. The byre has doorways with tie-stone jambs, and external steps leading up to a hayloft on the left. The barn contains two cart entries, the larger with a cambered arch and voussoirs, and slit vents, and to the right is a lean-to calf-house.
Farm buildings west of Manor Farmhouse; 53.85189°N 1.47820°W	—	Late 18th century	The three buildings are in gritstone and have roofs of stone slate and grey slate. On the left is a dovecote with three storeys, a pyramidal roof, and a glazed cupola. The middle building is an open cart shed with a stone central pier. On the right is a two-storey byre and stable with a hayloft above, that contains square windows and an inserted doorway, and has external steps leading to a low doorway.
197–205 Main Street; 53.85196°N 1.47242°W	—	c. 1800	A row of five gritstone houses with slate roofs. The left house is lower, with quoins, and the other houses have coped gables. The windows in the left bay have small panes, the others are square windows, all with large lintels.
133–139 Main Street; 53.85372°N 1.47808°W		Early 19th century	A row of four houses in gritstone, with quoins and a stone slate roof. There are two storeys and four bays. The doorways have fanlights, and the windows are casements.
Library; 53.85409°N 1.48128°W		Early 19th century	Originally a chapel, later a library, it is in gritstone, with a band, and a hipped stone roof. There are two storeys, three bays, and a single-storey entrance bay on the left. The entrance has a moulded architrave, and in the main part are sash windows with slightly cambered arches and voussoirs, one of which is blind.
St Paul's Church; 53.85242°N 1.47433°W		1841–42	The church was designed by R. D. Chantrell in Neo-Norman style. It is built in gritstone with a stone slate roof, and consists of a four-bay nave, a south porch, a polygonal east apse, and an added northeast vestry. On the west gable is a bellcote. The nave contains round-headed windows, pilasters and a corbel table, and the porch has a round-arched entrance with a zigzag surround.
1–8 Crofton Terrace; 53.85313°N 1.46789°W	—	Mid 19th century	A row of eight houses in gritstone, with moulded gutter brackets and a slate roof. There are two storeys and nine bays, the outer bays projecting slightly and gabled at the front. In the centre is a segmental-headed cart entrance with voussoirs and a keystone. The doorways have fanlights, and the windows are sashes.
War memorial 53.85232°N 1.47437°W		c. 1920	The war memorial is in the churchyard of St Paul's Church. It is in stone and consists of a crucifix on a shaft, a base and octagonal steps. On the base are carved to the dates of the First and Second World Wars, and the names of those lost in the conflicts.
