= Listed buildings in Lothersdale =

Lothersdale is a civil parish in the county of North Yorkshire, England. It contains 14 listed buildings that are recorded in the National Heritage List for England. Of these, two are listed at Grade II, the middle of the three grades, and the others are at Grade II, the lowest grade. The parish contains the village of Lothersdale and the surrounding countryside. Most of the listed buildings are houses and farmhouses, and the others consist of a church, a textile mill, a former meeting house, and a water trough.

== Key ==
Grade	Criteria
II*	Particularly important buildings of more than special interest
II	Buildings of national importance and special interest

== Buildings ==
Name and location	Photograph	Date	Notes	Grade
14–17 The Fold; 53.91073°N 2.07766°W	—	17th century	A row of four houses in stone, with a stone slate roof, coped gables and kneelers. There are two storeys and eight bays. Two of the houses have doorways with chamfered surrounds, most of the windows are mullioned, with some mullions missing, and some have hood moulds.	II
Further Surgill Head Farmhouse and barn 53.89963°N 2.07670°W	—	1666	The farmhouse and attached barns are in stone with stone slate roofs. The house has two storeys and three bays. In the centre is a gabled porch with kneelers, and a doorway with a chamfered surround and a massive lintel. The windows are mullioned, and at the rear is a doorway with a chamfered surround. Attached to the house is a barn containing a cart entry and other openings, and set into the wall is an inscribed and dated stone. Beyond is a later barn containing an elliptical-headed cart entry with numbered voussoirs and a chamfered surround, and another dated stone.	II
Long Syke Edge farmhouse and barn 53.89489°N 2.08104°W	—	1666	The farmhouse and barn are in stone with a stone slate roof. The farmhouse has two storeys and two bays. The windows are mullioned, with some mullions missing. To the left is a doorway with a chamfered surround and a staggered ogee head, above which is an initialled and dated plaque. There is another doorway with a plain surround and a dated plaque, and on the barn is another dated and initialled plaque.	II
Woodhead Farmhouse; 53.90551°N 2.06277°W	—	1673	The farmhouse is in stone on a partial plinth, with quoins and a stone slate roof. There are two storeys and four bays. In the third bay is a two-storey porch with an ogee-moulded string course between the storeys, The doorway has moulded jambs, and an inscribed lintel. Most of the windows are mullioned, some with hood moulds, and on the left gable is a sundial.	II
Knott Farmhouse; 53.91435°N 2.07295°W	—	1696	The farmhouse is in stone with quoins and a stone slate roof. There are two storeys and three bays. In the centre is a two-storey porch, the upper storey jettied, and gabled with moulded coping and kneelers. The doorway has a moulded surround and a dated and initialled lintel. In the upper storey is a window of Venetian style with a moulded surround, hollow spandrels and a stepped hood mould. This is flanked by bulbous detached colonnettes with cabled rings on moulded corbels. Most of the windows are mullioned, with some mullions missing.	II
Stone Gappe; 53.90770°N 2.05024°W		1725	The house is in stone, with chamfered quoins, two string courses, a heavy cornice, and a hipped stone slate roof. There are three storeys and five bays, the middle bay of the south front canted. On the east front is a semi-octagonal porch with a round-headed doorway and tripartite mullioned windows. Most of the windows in the house are sashes, those in the ground floor in architraves, and at the rear is a round-headed stair window and a mullioned window. One of the chimneys has blind arcading and is initialled and dated.	II*
Stansfield House; 53.91012°N 2.06221°W	—	1752	The house is pebbledashed, and has quoins, and a stone slate roof with coped gables and kneelers. There are three storeys and two bays. The central doorway has a stone surround and a slight camber, and to its right is a canted bay window. In the top floor is a window with four small lights, and the other windows are mullioned with two lights.	II
Spen House Farmhouse and barn 53.90552°N 2.07316°W	—	1761	The farmhouse and attached barn are in stone, with quoins and a stone slate roof with coped gables and kneelers. The house has two storeys and three bays. On the front is a gabled porch and a washhouse, and a doorway with a plain surround. The windows are mullioned with four lights. The barn contains a doorway with a heavy lintel and a small flat-headed cart entry, over which is an inscribed and dated tablet.	II
Quaker House; 53.90959°N 2.06531°W		1776	The meeting house, later converted for residential use, is in stone, with quoins, and a stone slate roof with coped gables and kneelers. There are five bays, the left three bays with one storey and the others with two. In the left three bays are tall sash windows, and in the fourth bay is a doorway with a divided fanlight, above which is a smaller sash window. The right bay contains two-light mullioned windows with sashes.	II
Briggstones; 53.91721°N 2.06824°W	—	1794	The house is in stone with a stone slate roof and kneelers. There are two storeys and two bays. The doorway has a plain surround, and the windows are mullioned.	II
Dale End Mill; 53.90940°N 2.06320°W		1796	A corn mill that was later expanded and converted into a textile mill, initially water-powered, and later steam-powered. The mill buildings are in stone with roofs of stone slate with some glazing. They consist of three blocks, weaving sheds, a waterwheel house containing a large waterwheel, and a chimney 90 feet (27 m) high.	II*
The Oliver Farmhouse; 53.89226°N 2.08262°W	—	c. 1800	The farmhouse is in stone, with a stone slate roof, two storeys and two bays. The doorway has a plain surround, and the windows are mullioned.	II.
Christ Church; 53.90971°N 2.05778°W		1838	The church was designed by R. D. Chantrell, and the chancel was added in 1884. It is built in stone with a slate roof, and consists of a nave, a chancel, and a west tower. The tower has three stages, diagonal buttresses, a south doorway, two-light bell openings, and an embattled parapet with crocketed pinnacles.	II.
Water trough 53.91073°N 2.07848°W	—	1858	The water trough is a large rectangular stone tank inscribed with initials and the date.	II.
