= Stone Gappe =

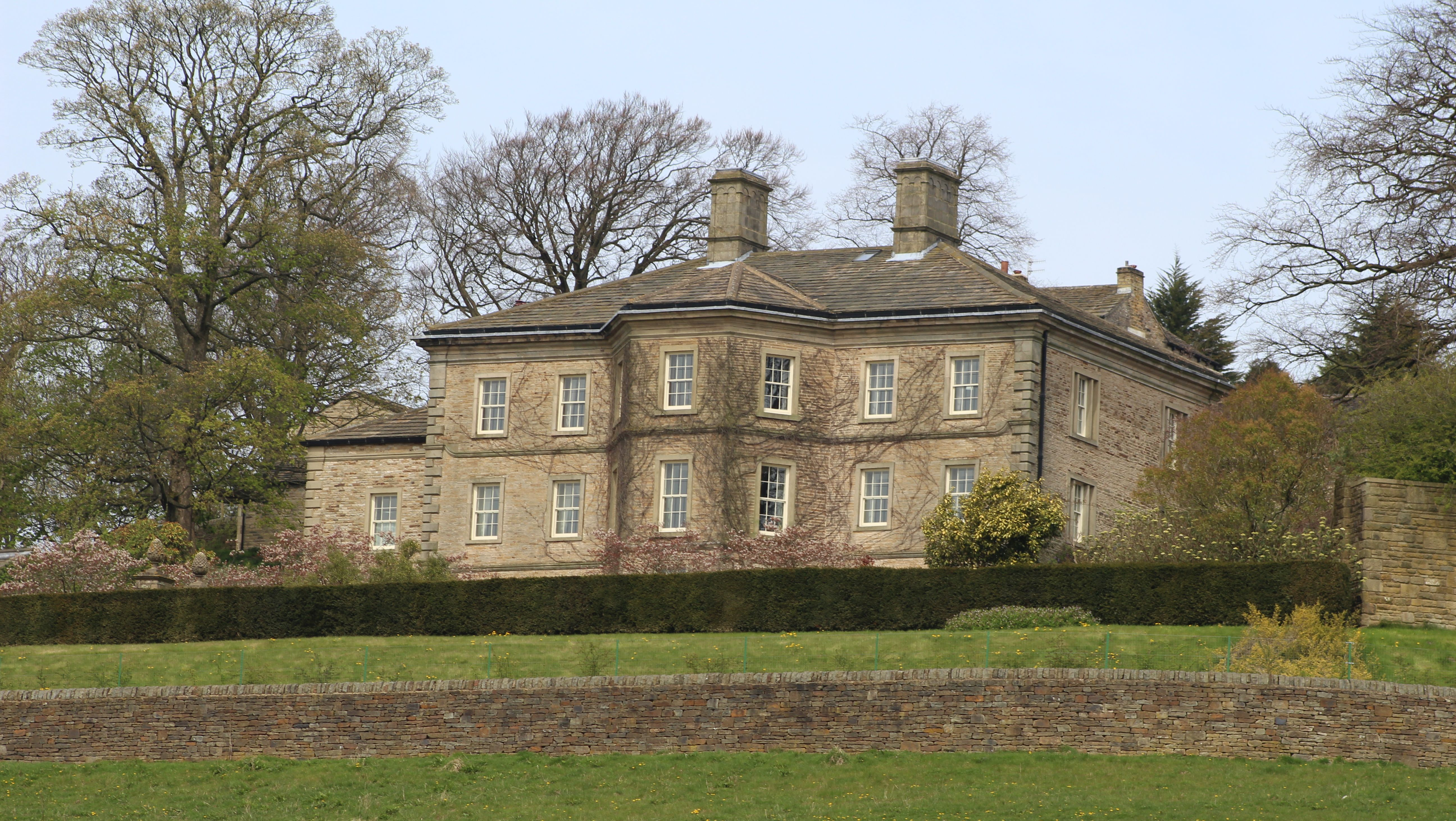

- Location within North Yorkshire
- 53°54′29″N 2°3′1″W
- Location: Lothersdale
- OS grid reference: SD967457

History
- Built: 1725

Site notes
- Area: North Yorkshire, England

Listed Building – Grade II*
- Designated: 10 September 1954
- Reference no.: 1167086

Stone Gappe is an 18th-century house in Lothersdale, North Yorkshire, England; it is a Grade II* listed building.

== Construction ==
The house was constructed for William Bawdwen and completed in 1725. It is constructed of dressed stone with a hipped slate roof. Three storeys high and five bays wide, the south elevation is symmetrical about a central canted bay.

== Literary and musical connections ==
By 1839 the house was owned by John Benson Sidgwick, a mill owner in nearby Skipton, and in May 1839 he engaged Charlotte Brontë to be governess for two of his children. Brontë's stay was short though and within weeks she left to return to Haworth. It is considered that Stone Gappe was the model for Gateshead Hall, the childhood home of the eponymous heroine of Jane Eyre.

The house became the property of Sir John Horsfall, baronet of Hayfield and his heirs. The family let the house and one of the tenants was Dr J Black and his family. Dr Black's wife was Clare Delius, sister of the composer Frederick Delius and in her book, Frederick Delius: Memories of my Brother, there are several references to the composer's visits to the house.

== Youth use ==
By the mid-1920s the property was let to the Reverend Aldous, the rector of Lothersdale, who sub-let the house to be used as a youth camp centre along the lines of those organised by the then Duke of York (later George VI). In 1931 the house became the first youth hostel opened in Yorkshire's West Riding by Youth Hostels Association (England & Wales). Despite initial popularity the use as a hostel only lasted until July 1935 due to the greater popularity of other locations.

== Current use ==
The house remains in private hands and has reverted to use as a private residence.

== See also ==
- Grade II* listed buildings in North Yorkshire (district)
- Listed buildings in Lothersdale
