= Dale End Mill =

Building in Lothersdale, North Yorkshire, England

Coordinates: 53°54′34″N 2°03′47″W

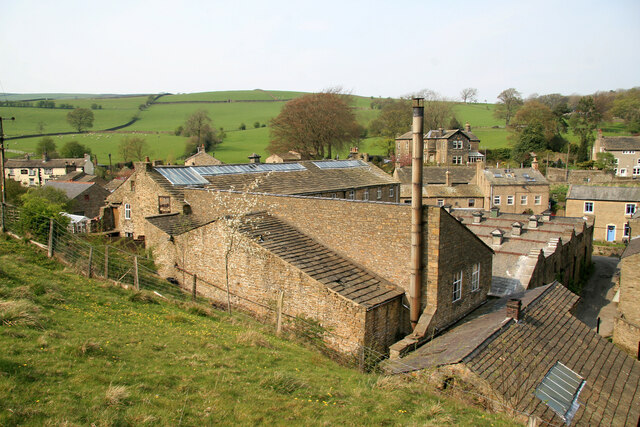
The mill in 2007

Dale End Mill, also known as Lothersdale Mill, is a historic building in Lothersdale, a village in North Yorkshire, in England.

== History ==
A watermill on the site was first recorded in the 17th century. In 1792, the corn mill was purchased by Thomas Parker, and in 1795 he largely rebuilt it, doubling its size, to instead spin cotton. In 1835, the mill began spinning worsted, and in 1852 weaving sheds were constructed over the beck which powered the water wheel, along with a gas plant to provide lighting. In 1861, a larger waterwheel was installed, manufactured by James Ellison, along with a new steam engine with a boiler and chimney. The wheel is believed to be the largest indoor waterwheel ever installed in the UK and largest surviving waterwheel, 44.5 feet (13.6 m) in diameter, and generating up to 40 horsepower (30 kW). In the 1910s, the building was extended to the southwest, and in 1932 the mill was converted to run on electricity. The disused waterwheel was left in place, but ceased to rotate in the 1980s, and is mentioned on the Heritage at Risk Register as being in very poor condition.

In 1983, all but the westernmost section of the mill closed, with the remainder being used for retail and warehousing. In the 2020s, it was converted into workshops and holiday accommodation. The building was grade II listed in 1988, and upgraded to grade II* in 2015.

== Description ==
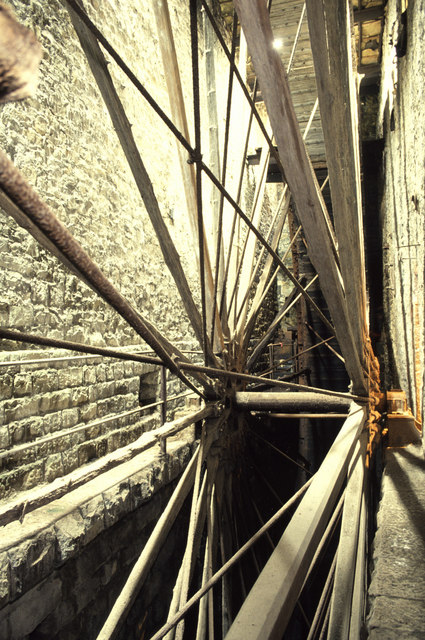
The waterwheel

The mill buildings are in stone with roofs of stone slate with some glazing. They consist of three blocks, weaving sheds, a waterwheel house containing a large waterwheel, and a chimney 90 feet (27 m) high. The waterwheel has a mixture of timber and wrought iron spokes, a development of the suspension waterwheel with some spokes in tension and others in compression. It was designed to work in tandem with the steam engine, each regulating the other. The remains of an economiser are also visible inside. The west range includes mid-Victorian fittings and has an internal window to provide a view of the workroom.

== See also ==
- Grade II* listed buildings in North Yorkshire (district)
- Listed buildings in Lothersdale
