= Pool-in-Wharfedale =

Village and civil parish in West Yorkshire, England

Coordinates: 53.903°N 1.630°W

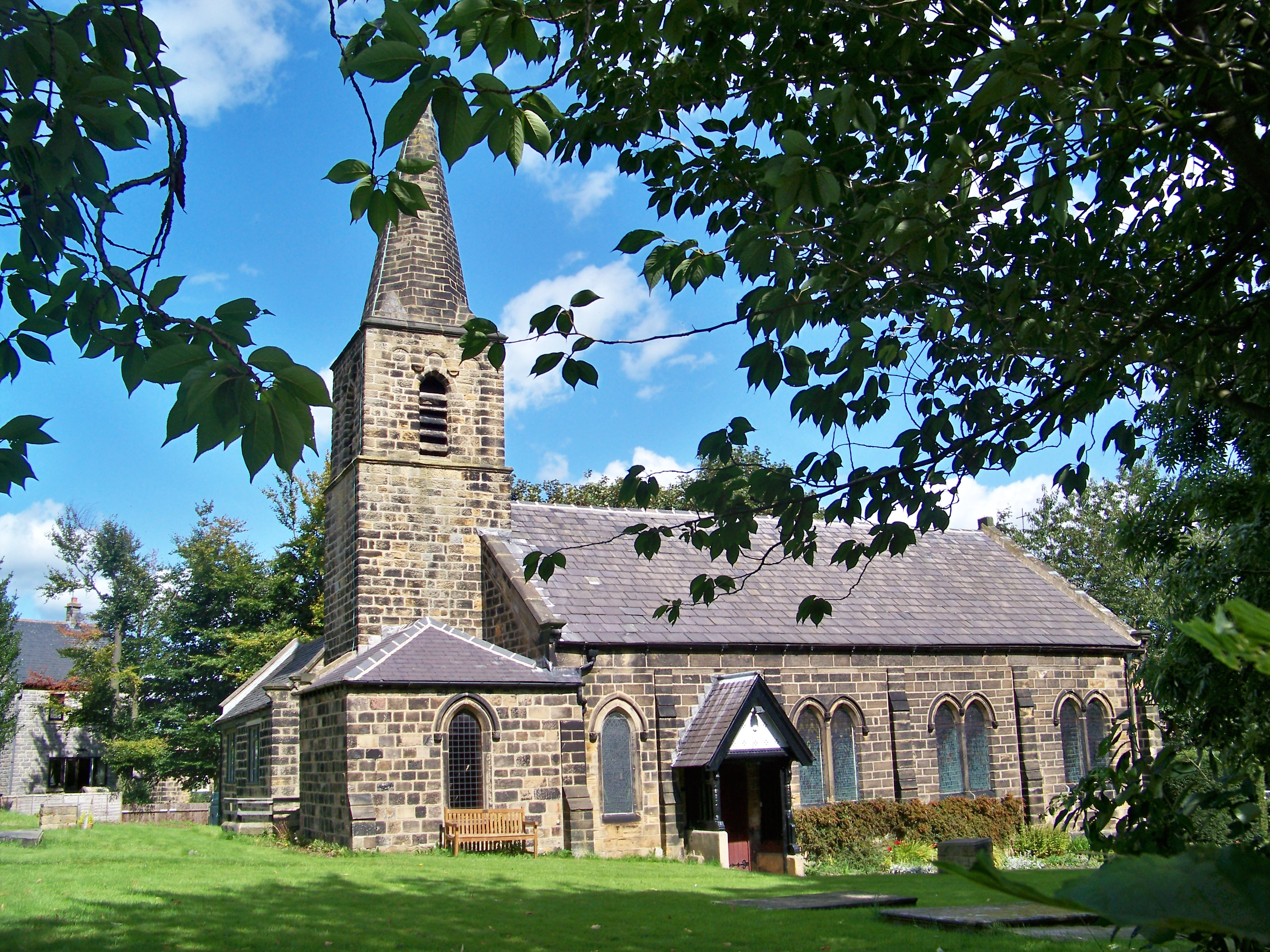
- Pool-in-Wharfedale Anglican Church

- Location within West Yorkshire
- Population: 2,284 (2011)
- OS grid reference: SE244453
- Civil parish: Pool
- Metropolitan borough: City of Leeds
- Metropolitan county: West Yorkshire
- Region: Yorkshire and the Humber
- Country: England
- Sovereign state: United Kingdom
- Post town: OTLEY
- Postcode district: LS21
- Dialling code: 0113
- Police: West Yorkshire
- Fire: West Yorkshire
- Ambulance: Yorkshire
- UK Parliament: Leeds North West

Pool-in-Wharfedale or Pool in Wharfedale, usually abbreviated to Pool, is a village and civil parish in Lower Wharfedale, West Yorkshire, England, 10 miles (16 km) north of Leeds city centre, 11 miles (18 km) north-east of Bradford, and 2 miles (3.2 km) east of Otley. It is in the City of Leeds metropolitan borough, and within the historic boundaries of the West Riding of Yorkshire.

Pool in Wharfedale is connected to the rest of West Yorkshire and surrounding areas by trunk roads and buses. It had a railway station, which linked the village to Leeds, until it closed as part of the Beeching Axe, but Weeton railway station is nearby. It had a population of 2,284 at the 2011 Census, up from 1,785 in 2001.

Pool is a scenic village and enjoys views in most directions, including The Chevin, the Arthington Viaduct and Almscliffe Crag. Running past the outskirts of Pool is the River Wharfe, which is prone to flooding. Nearby is Pool Bank, a steep hill.

There is a parish council, the lowest tier of local government.

== History ==
The name Pool derives from the Old English Pofel, a word of unknown meaning and origin, perhaps related to the Scots word poffle meaning 'a small piece of land'.

The history of Pool-in-Wharfedade is well documented, with an archive held by Pool Parish Council. It is mentioned in the Domesday Book of 1086 as Pouele in the Liberty of Otley.

In 1881 the diarist John Dickinson wrote: "The people down at Pool are chiefly poor working people who are dependent on the paper mill and stone quarry and those trades are very bad just now. But there are several gentlemen's residences occupied by retired tradesmen from Leeds."

On 5 July 2014, the Tour de France Stage 1 from Leeds to Harrogate passed through the village.

The village is represented in association football by Pool AFC who compete in the West Yorkshire Football League and play at the sports complex on Arthington Lane.

In recent years the village has rapidly increased in size with the construction of many new homes.

== Amenities ==
The village amenities include a pub, a post office, a garage, one primary school, a petrol station, a sports and social club with bar and the village hall. It also has two parks and miles of riverside walks. The church of St Wilfred was rebuilt in 1839 on the site of a chapel of ease; its architect was Robert Dennis Chantrell.

== Gallery ==
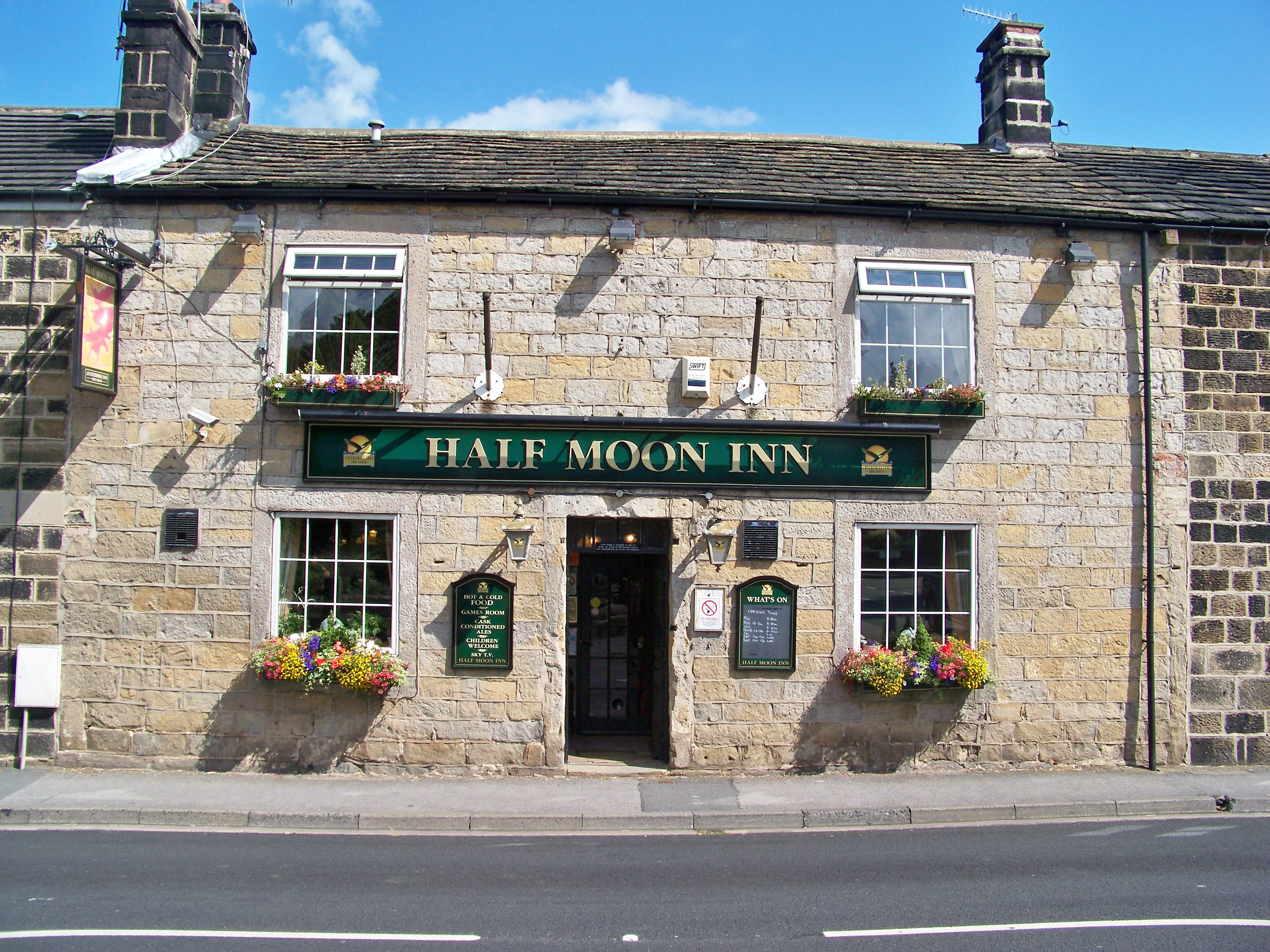
Half Moon Inn, now closed

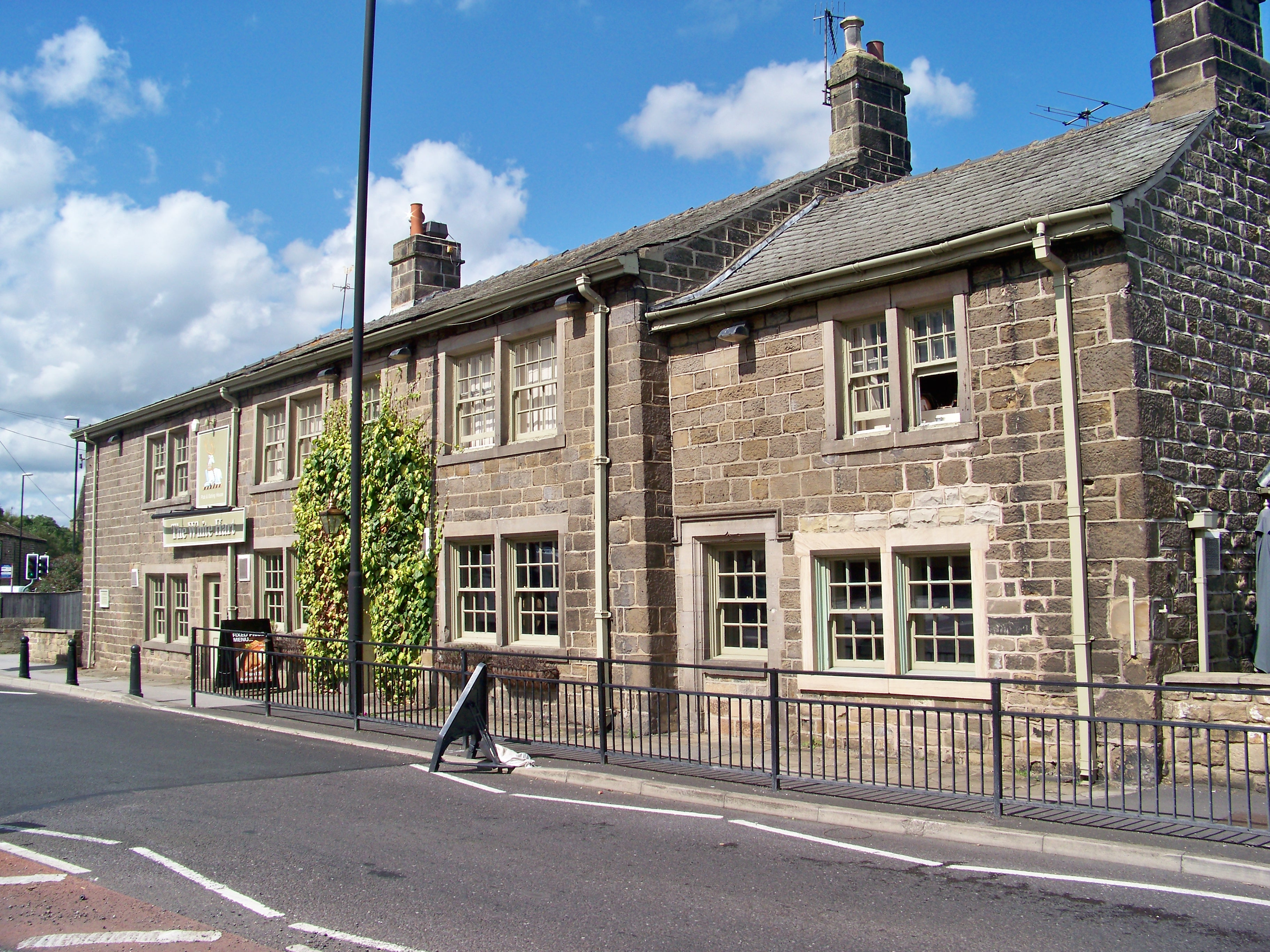
The White Hart

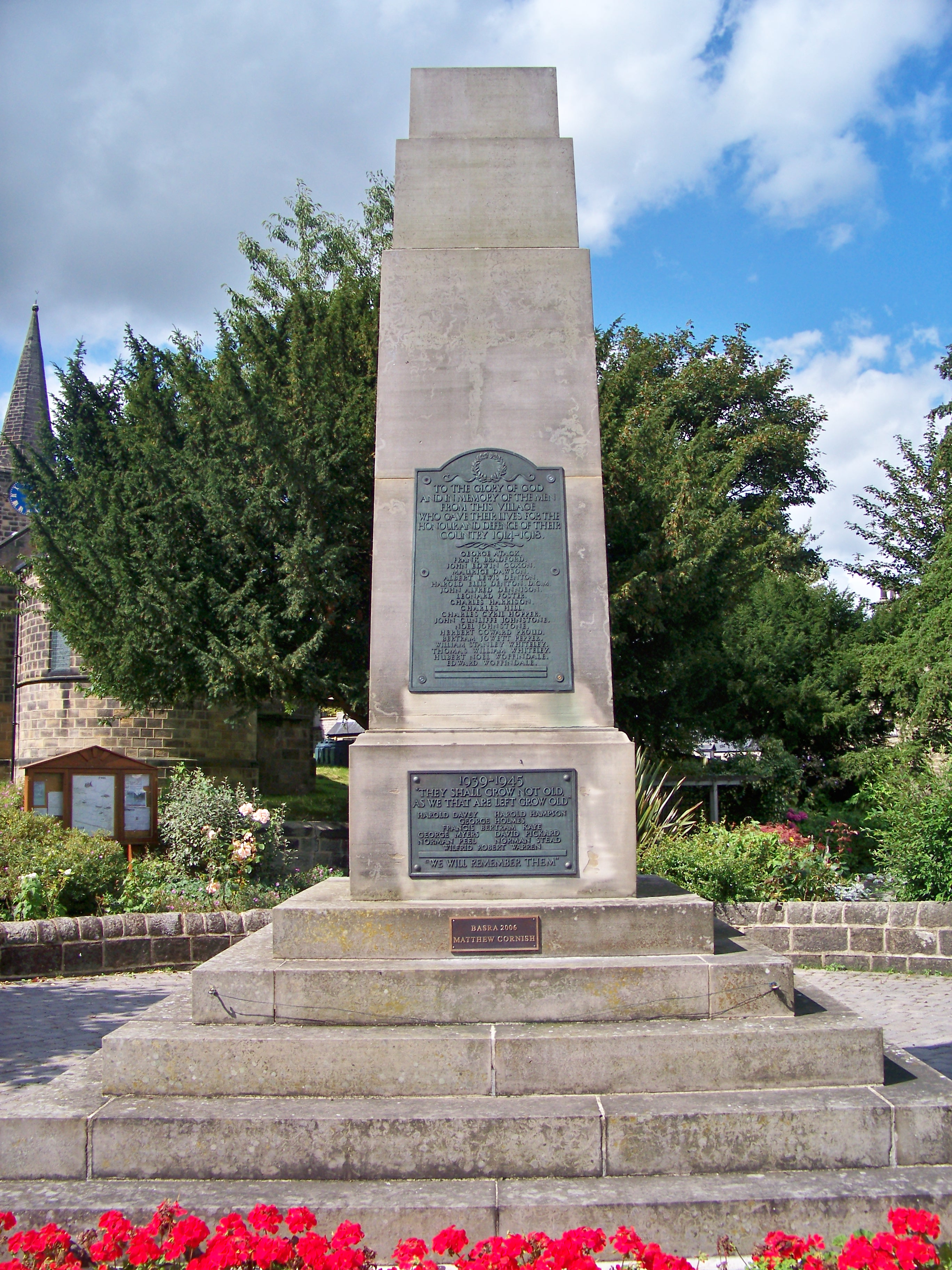
War memorial listing those from Pool who died in the Great War, the Second World War and the Iraq conflict

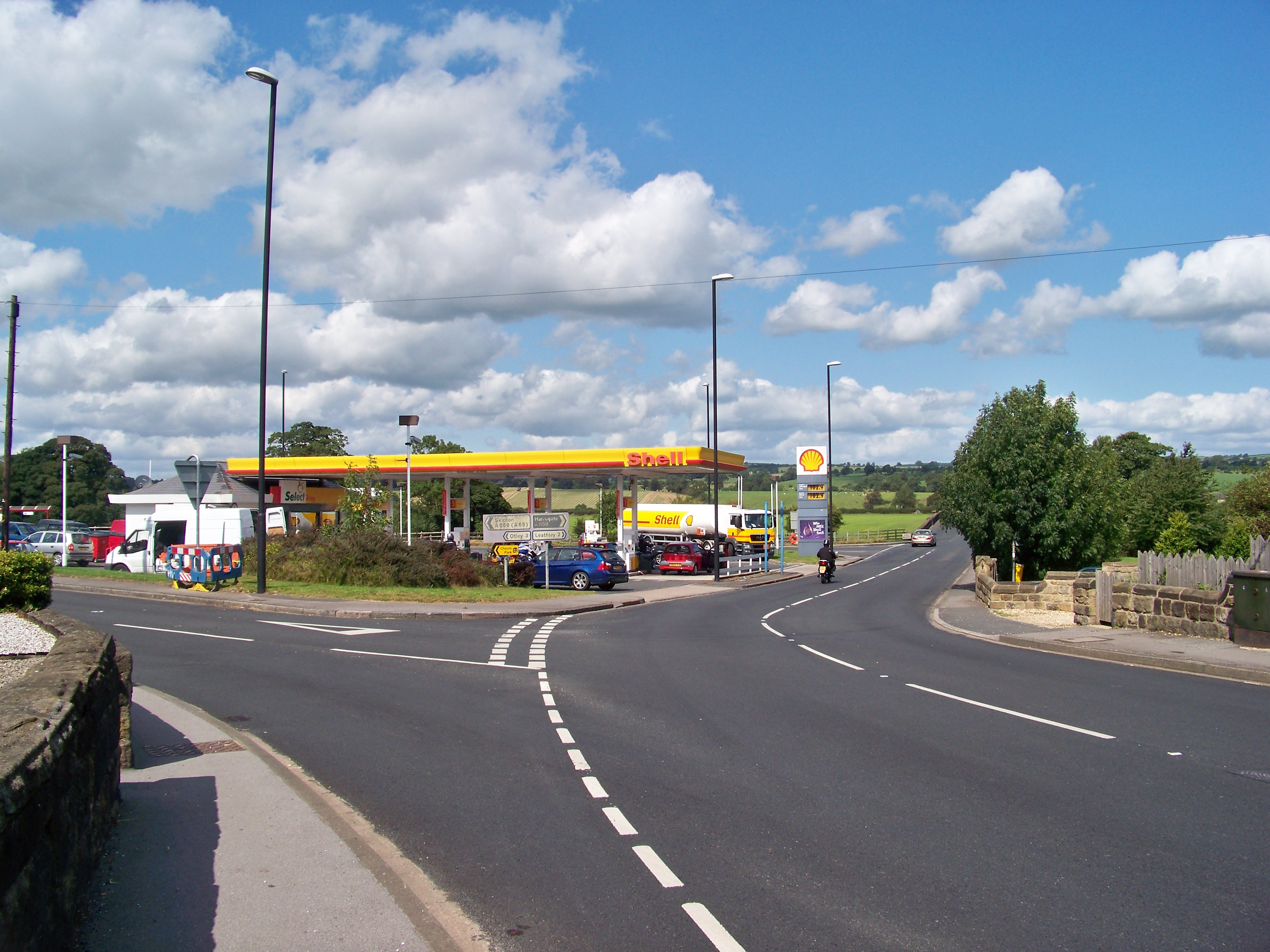
Shell filling station

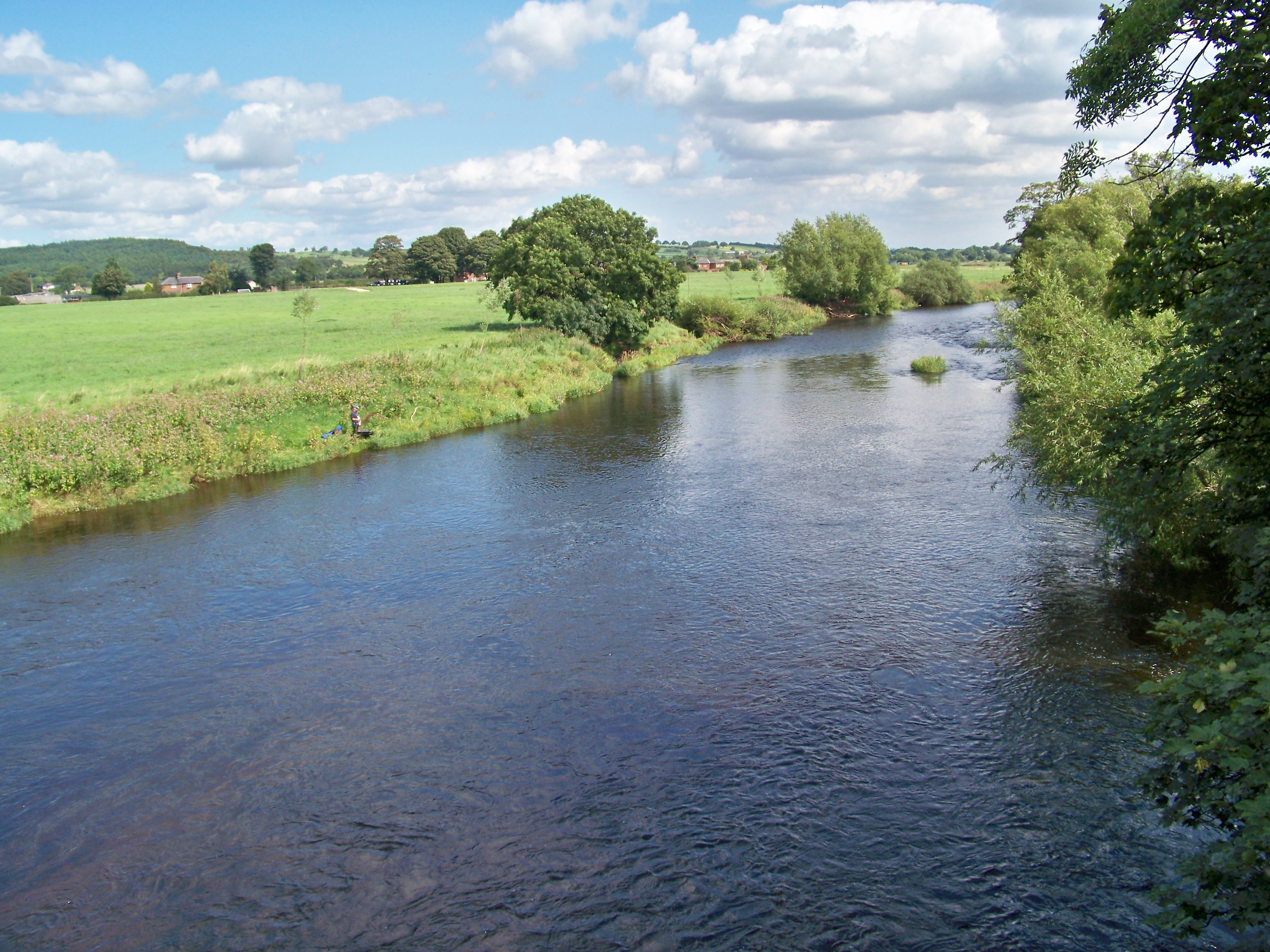
The River Wharfe looking downstream from the A658 bridge

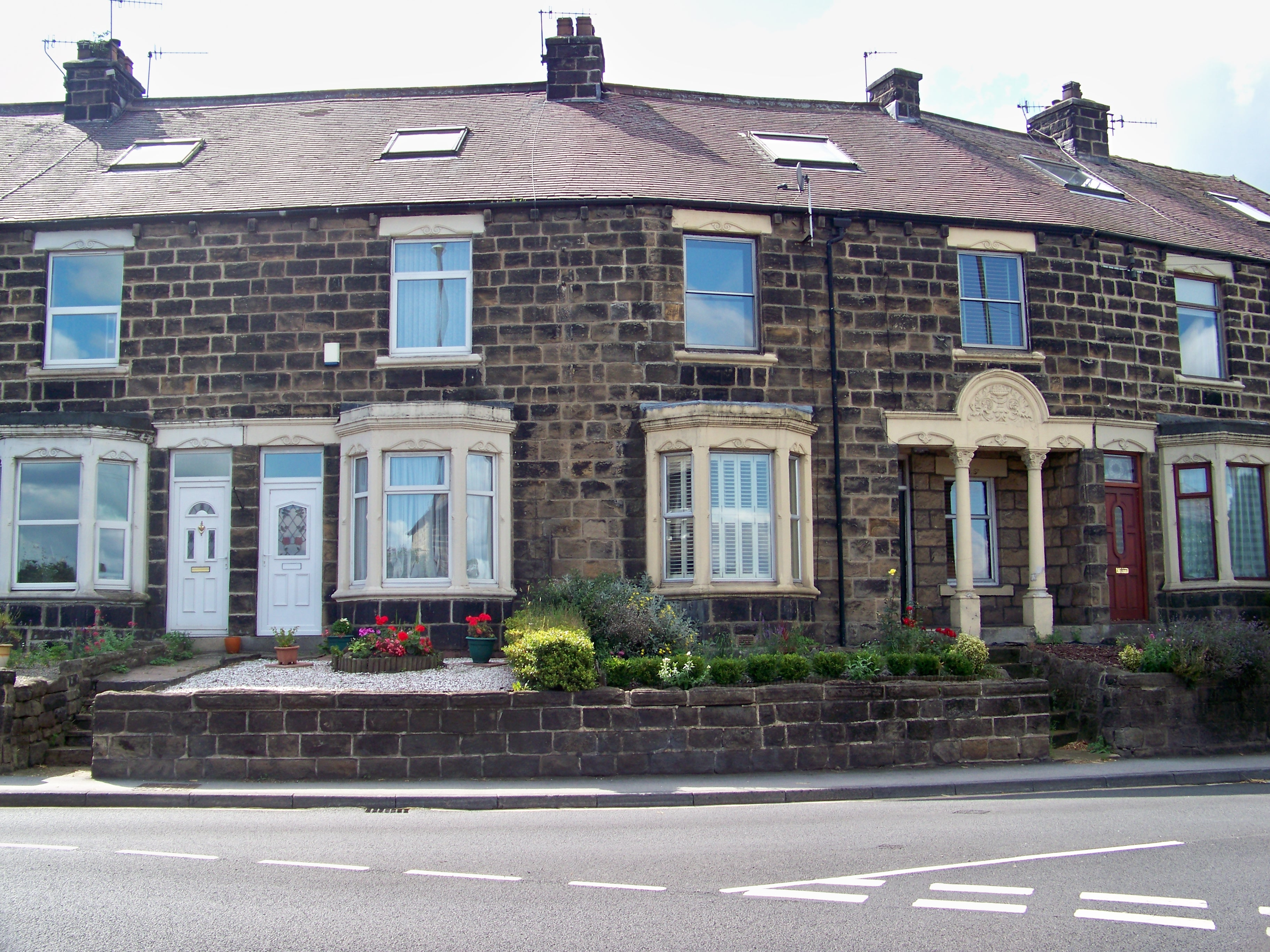
Victorian Terraces in the village

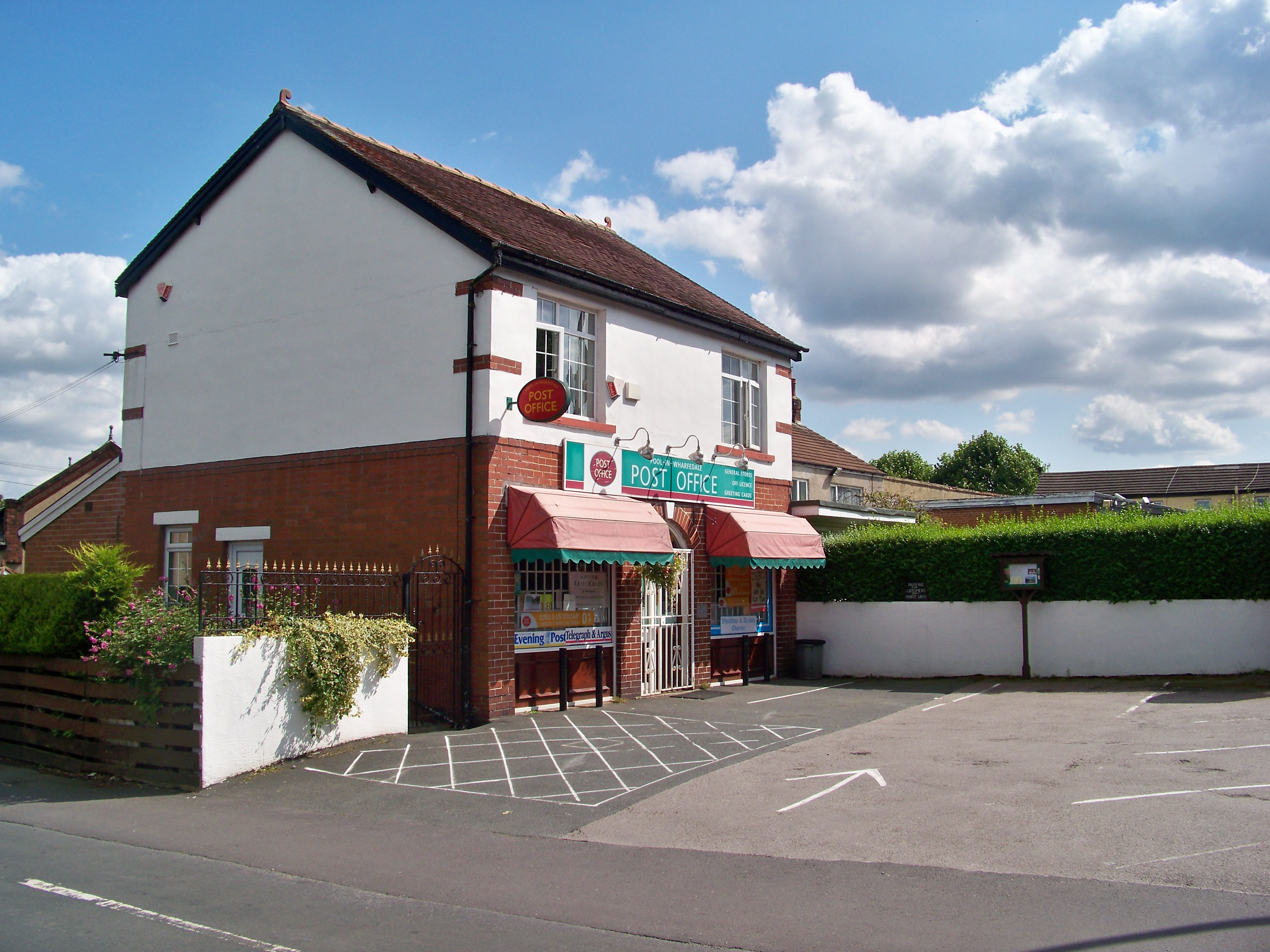
The Post Office

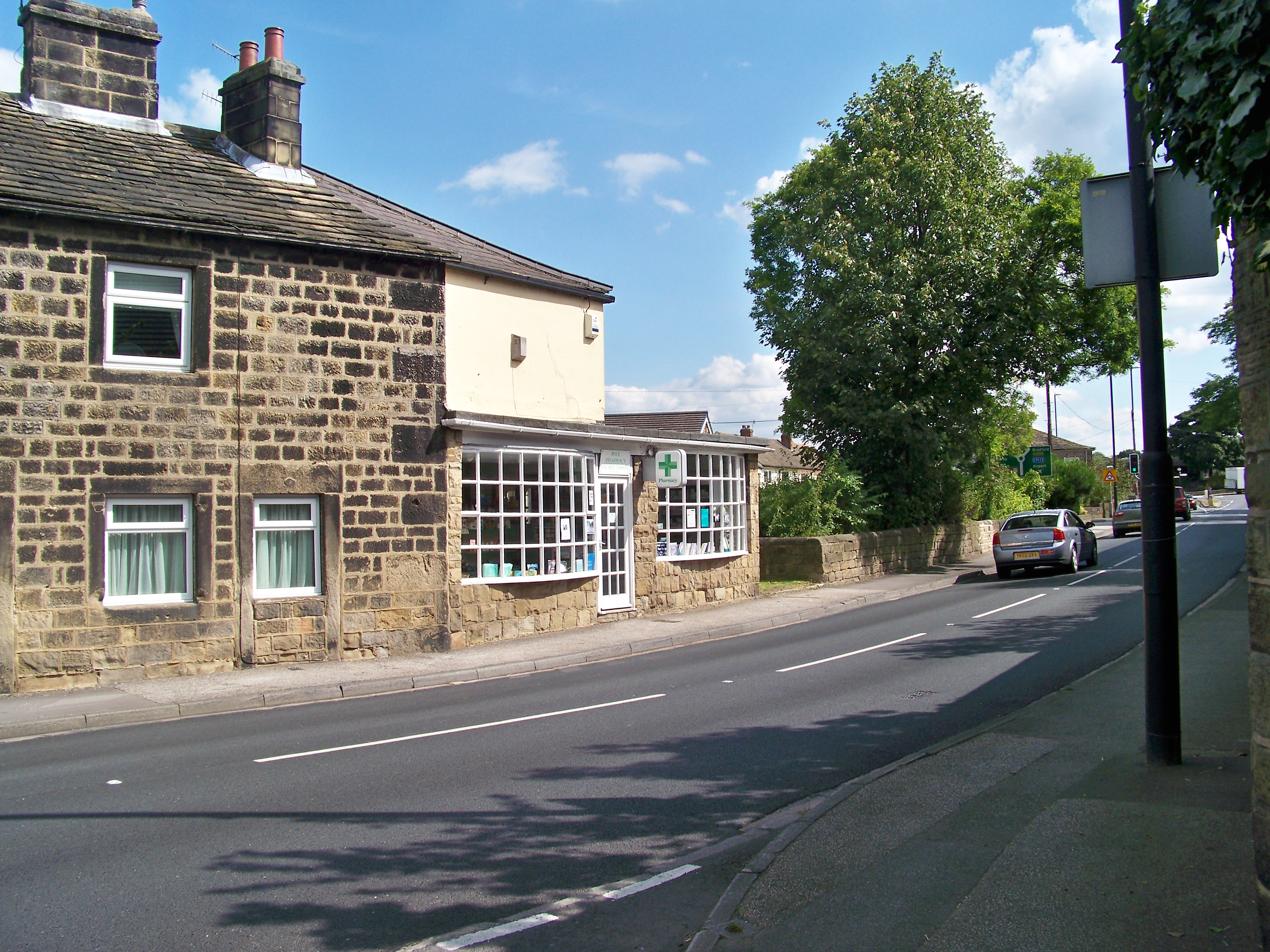
The village pharmacy

== See also ==
- Listed buildings in Pool-in-Wharfedale
