= Christ Church, Lothersdale =

Church in Lothersdale, North Yorkshire, England

Coordinates: 53°54′35″N 2°03′28″W

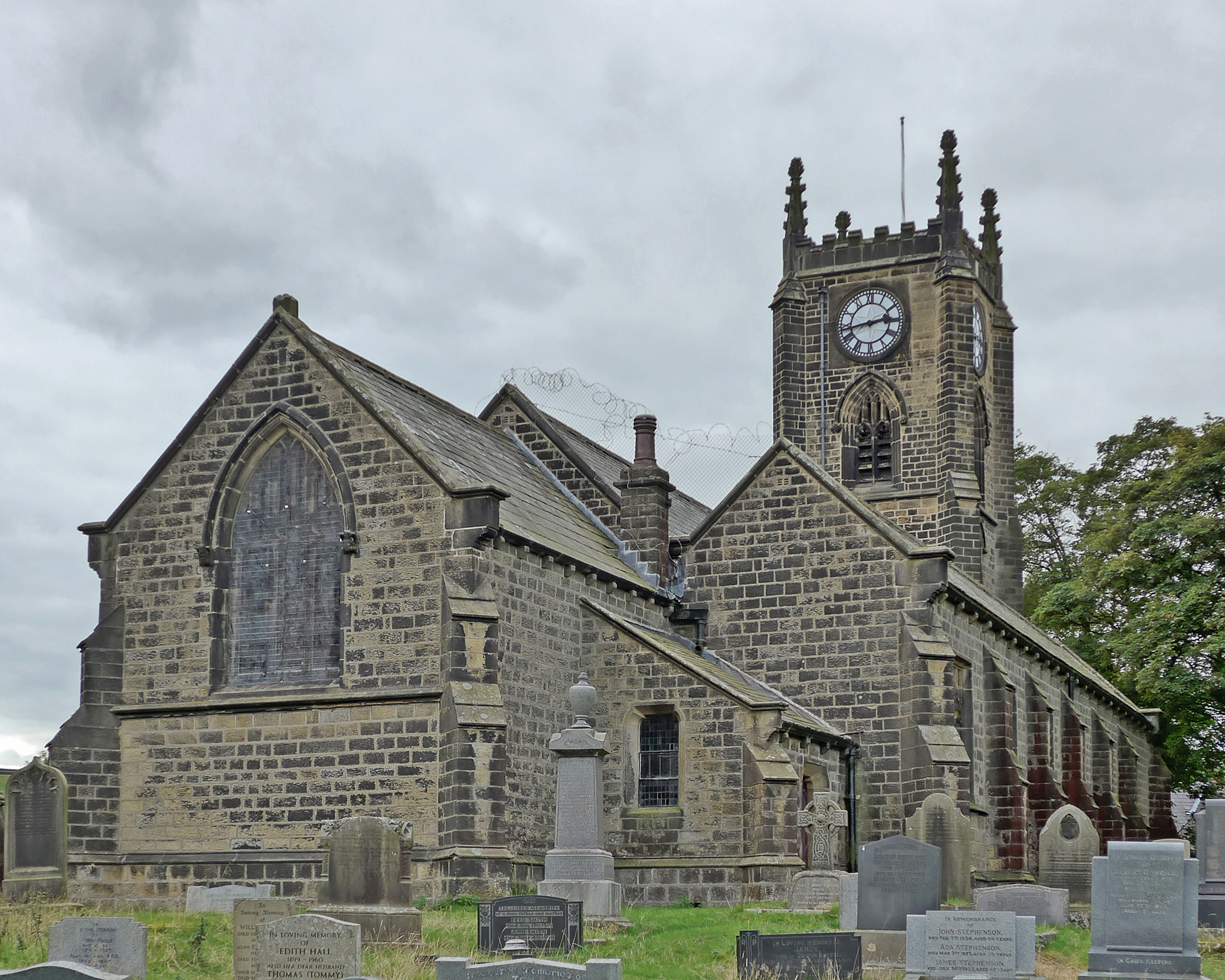
The church, in 2015

Christ Church is the parish church of Lothersdale, a village in North Yorkshire, in England.

Lothersdale was historically in the parishes of St Mary's Church, Carleton-in-Craven and St Andrew's Church, Kildwick. William Cavendish donated an acre of land for the construction of a parish church. The building was designed by R. D. Chantrell and was completed in 1838. It could seat 320 worshippers, and in 1851 typically had around 100 adult worshippers each Sunday. A chancel was added in 1884, and the building was grade II listed in 1988.

The church is built of stone with a slate roof, and consists of a nave, a chancel, and a west tower. The tower has three stages, diagonal buttresses, a south doorway, two-light bell openings, and an embattled parapet with crocketed pinnacles. Inside, there are some low box pews and an octagonal font.

== See also ==
- Listed buildings in Lothersdale
