= Lothersdale =

Village and civil parish in North Yorkshire, England

Coordinates: 53°54′34″N 2°03′55″W

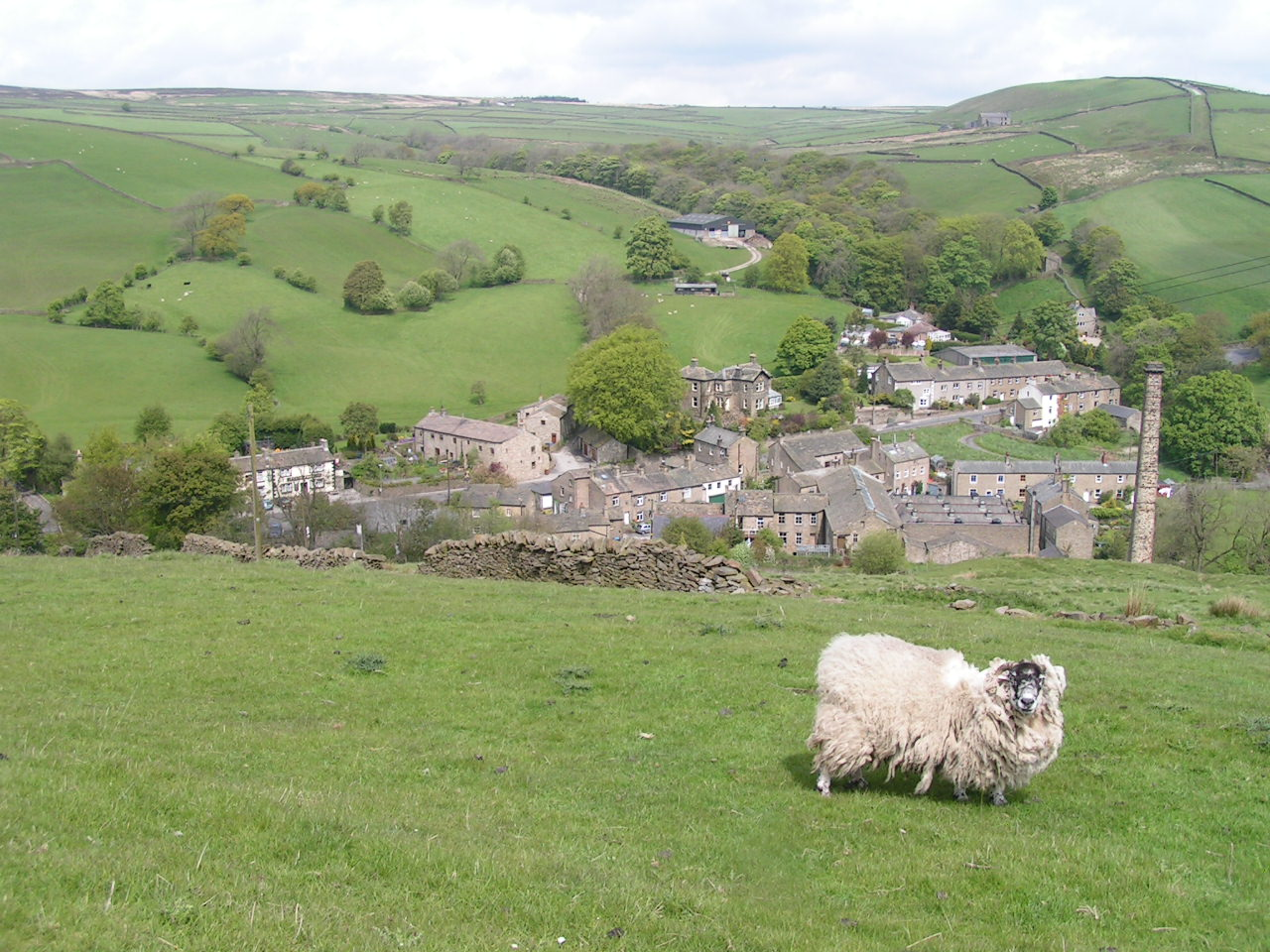
- Lothersdale from the Pennine Way

- Location within North Yorkshire
- Population: 518 (2011 census)
- OS grid reference: SD960460
- Unitary authority: North Yorkshire
- Ceremonial county: North Yorkshire
- Region: Yorkshire and the Humber
- Country: England
- Sovereign state: United Kingdom
- Post town: KEIGHLEY
- Postcode district: BD20
- Dialling code: 01535
- Police: North Yorkshire
- Fire: North Yorkshire
- Ambulance: Yorkshire
- UK Parliament: Skipton and Ripon

Lothersdale is a small village and civil parish in the county of North Yorkshire, England, near Skipton, and within the triangle formed by Skipton, Cross Hills, and Colne. It is a small community of about 200 houses but local amenities include a park, church, pub, village hall and primary school. The Pennine Way runs through it.

The parish council has five elected members and meets on the third Tuesday of each month (except for August) at 7.30 p.m. It decides on the amount of local taxes (the precept), planning applications, and numerous other issues pertaining to local life.

Until 1974, it was part of the West Riding of Yorkshire. From 1974 to 2023, it was part of the Craven District. It is now administered by the unitary North Yorkshire Council.

No house in the village is connected to mains gas or water, and it has limited mobile and broadband connection. This has had the effect of limiting the amount of development that has taken place, and gives the village an unspoiled atmosphere. It has also caused conflict for more than 25 years over the ownership rights of water from various springs.

The village boasts a recreation ground, which includes woodland walks, the village beck, bird-hide, picnic areas, a football pitch, a multi-use games area and a children's playground.

The village pub is the Hare and Hounds. The village hall is a popular venue for parties, concerts, dances, whist drives and other social events. The village has held an annual 'Party in the Park' in the recreation ground.

Dale End Mill is an 18th-century mill building.

On the site of a former lime and baryte quarry is Raygill Lakes, which was the first site studied by the Yorkshire Geological Society in 1875. Mammalian and marine fossils were discovered here.

The village has good rail connections (two miles away in Cononley) to Leeds, Bradford and London, about three hours by rail from Skipton. Access to Manchester is via the M65 motorway at Colne.

The primary school was ranked by Ofsted as "Outstanding" in 2014.

== Gallery ==
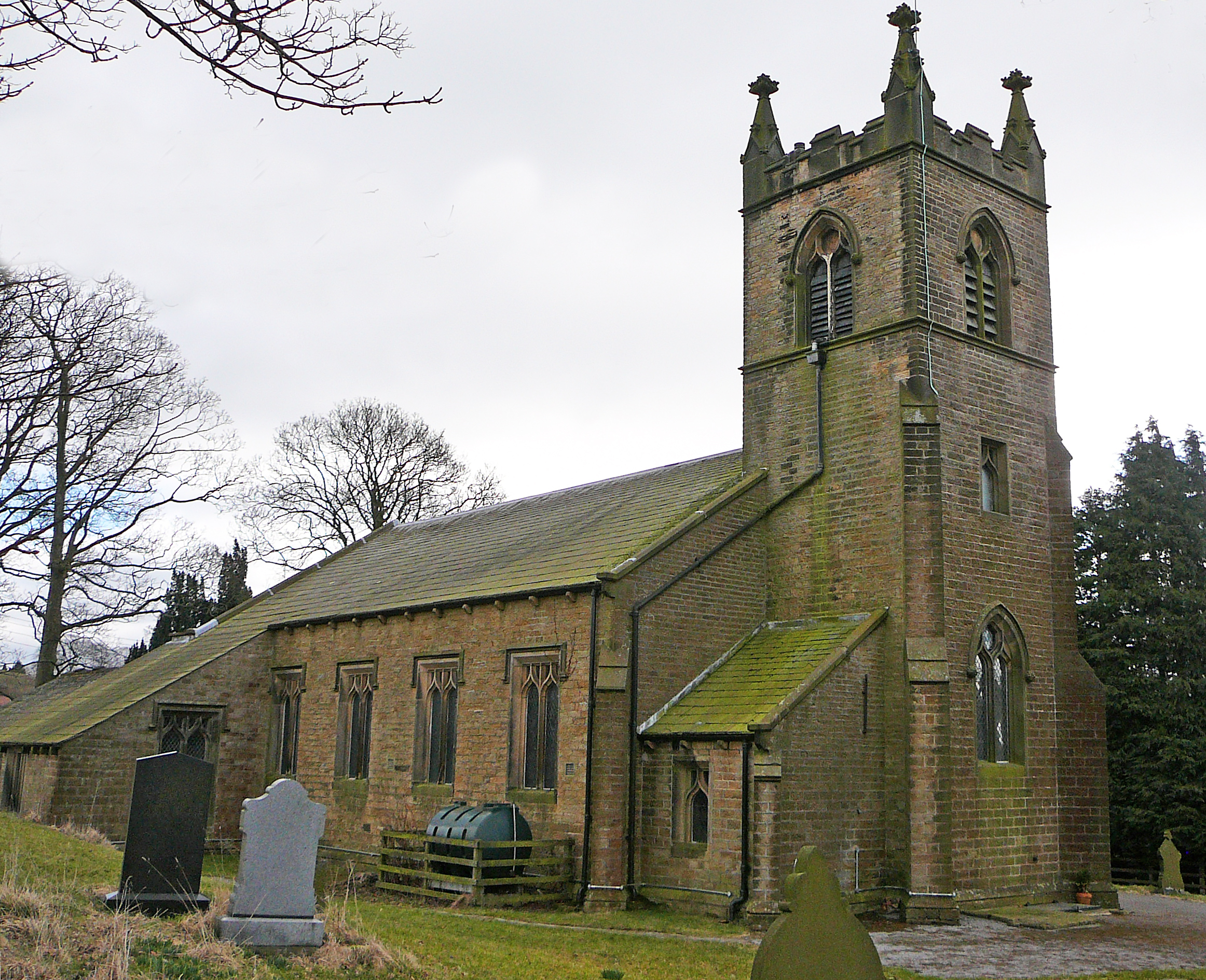
Christ Church

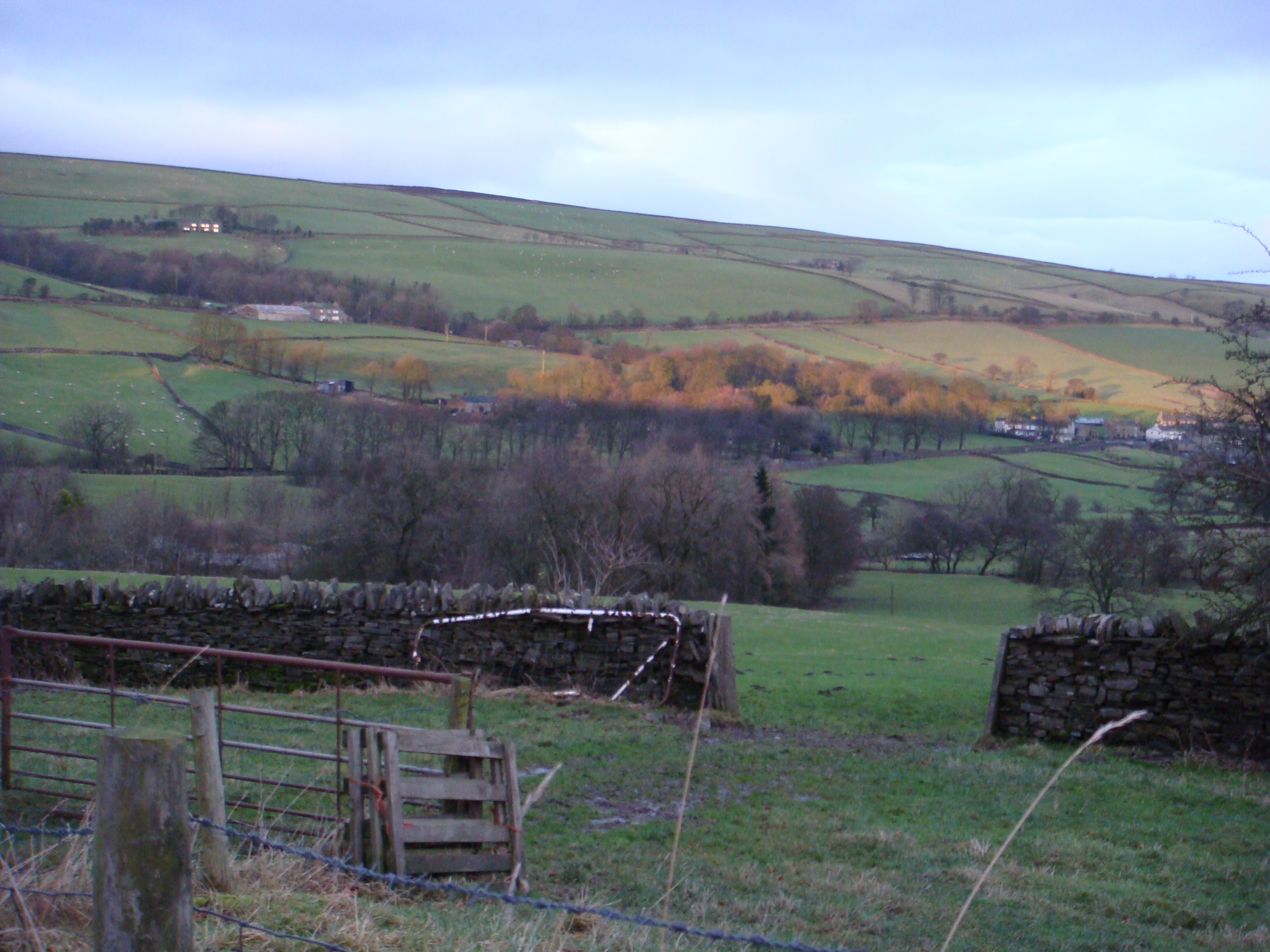
Raygill

== See also ==
- Listed buildings in Lothersdale
