= Shadwell, West Yorkshire =

Village and civil parish in West Yorkshire, England

Coordinates: 53.8547°N 1.4839°W

Shadwell
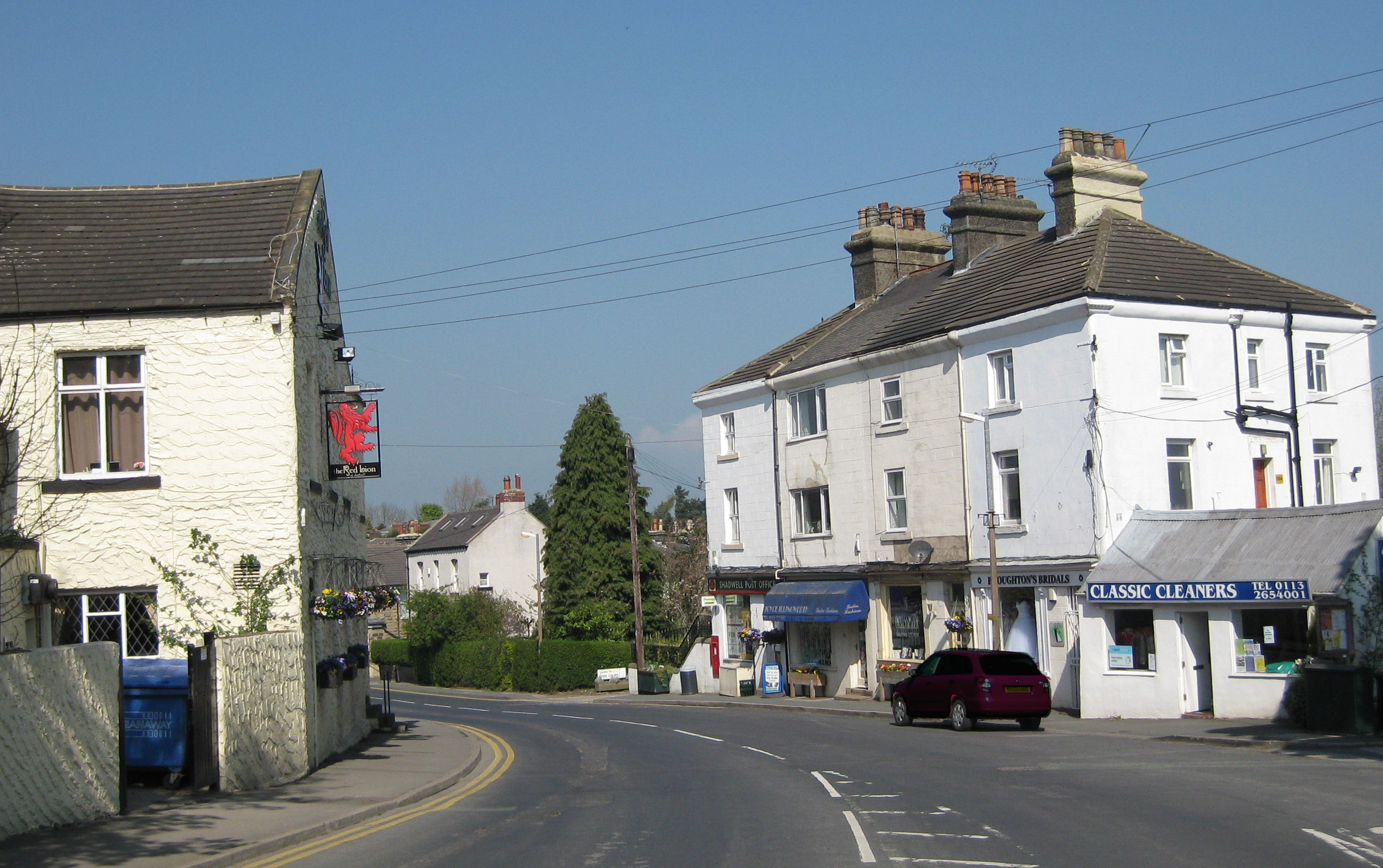
- Main Street: Red Lion and Post Office

- Location within West Yorkshire
- Population: 1,849 (2011 census)
- Civil parish: Shadwell
- Metropolitan borough: City of Leeds
- Metropolitan county: West Yorkshire
- Region: Yorkshire and the Humber
- Country: England
- Sovereign state: United Kingdom
- Post town: LEEDS
- Postcode district: LS17
- Dialling code: 0113
- Police: West Yorkshire
- Fire: West Yorkshire
- Ambulance: Yorkshire
- UK Parliament: Wetherby and Easingwold

Shadwell is a village and civil parish in northeast Leeds, West Yorkshire, England. The village is 6 miles (9.7 km) to the north east of Leeds city centre.

It sits in the Harewood ward of Leeds City Council and in the Wetherby and Easingwold constituency since 2024. The village is in the LS17 postal code and is served by the Shadwell Parish Council.

Shadwell borders areas including Alwoodley, Roundhay, Whinmoor and Moortown and is being increasingly referred to simply as an area or suburb of Leeds, but retains its many village traditions. It had a population of 1,864 in 2001, reducing to 1,849 in 2011 and reducing furthermore to 1,581 at the 2021 Census

== History ==
The first written proof of Shadwell's existence is in 1086 in William the Conqueror's Domesday Book, where it is called Scadewelle, and is part of the Feudal Barony of Pontefract. The origin of the name is not certain, and some 25 variations are found in the historical record, the present one being largely fixed in the 18th century. In the original Anglo-Saxon form, welle could mean a well, spring or boundary, often a boundary stream, such as Shadwell Beck. The scade portion could refer to shade, such as a shady spring, or a name such as Chad or Shad, and different characters with these names have been postulated.

Eight "wells" or ‘springs" situated within Shadwell are shown on an 1851 Ordnance Survey map. One of these, a “Holy Well”, is located in the Shadwell Holywell Triangle, a conservation area. Spring water emerges in a ditch near to the north entrance to Spencer House, a property on Holywell Lane. According to Leeds City Council's Conservation Area Appraisal and Management Plan, it is reputed to have been visited by Bede, and used for the baptism of early Christians. The village pub "The Red Lion" is located between two wells which were originally used to gather water for the brewing process.

In the Middle Ages it was part of the Wapentake of Skyrack. Over the centuries Shadwell was sometimes a separate manor, sometimes part of the Manor of Roundhay until these rights were extinguished in 1935.

In the early part of the 19th century it was still a village with fewer than 200 inhabitants, containing 11 farms, 2 inns and a Methodist chapel but no school or church. However, from the middle of the century buildings began to appear as wealthier people moved out of industrial Leeds, made with stone from the local quarries.

Shadwell was historically a township in the ancient church parish of Thorner in the West Riding of Yorkshire, until the construction of St Paul's Church in 1842 when it became a parish in its own right. Roundhay Grange, originally a grange of Kirkstall Abbey, was a detached part of the township. In 1866 the township became a separate civil parish as part of Wetherby Rural district, but in 1912 the parish was abolished and absorbed into Leeds.

In 1974 Shadwell became part of the enlarged City of Leeds in the new county of West Yorkshire. In 2002 the civil parish was reconstituted, with an elected parish council.

== Amenities ==
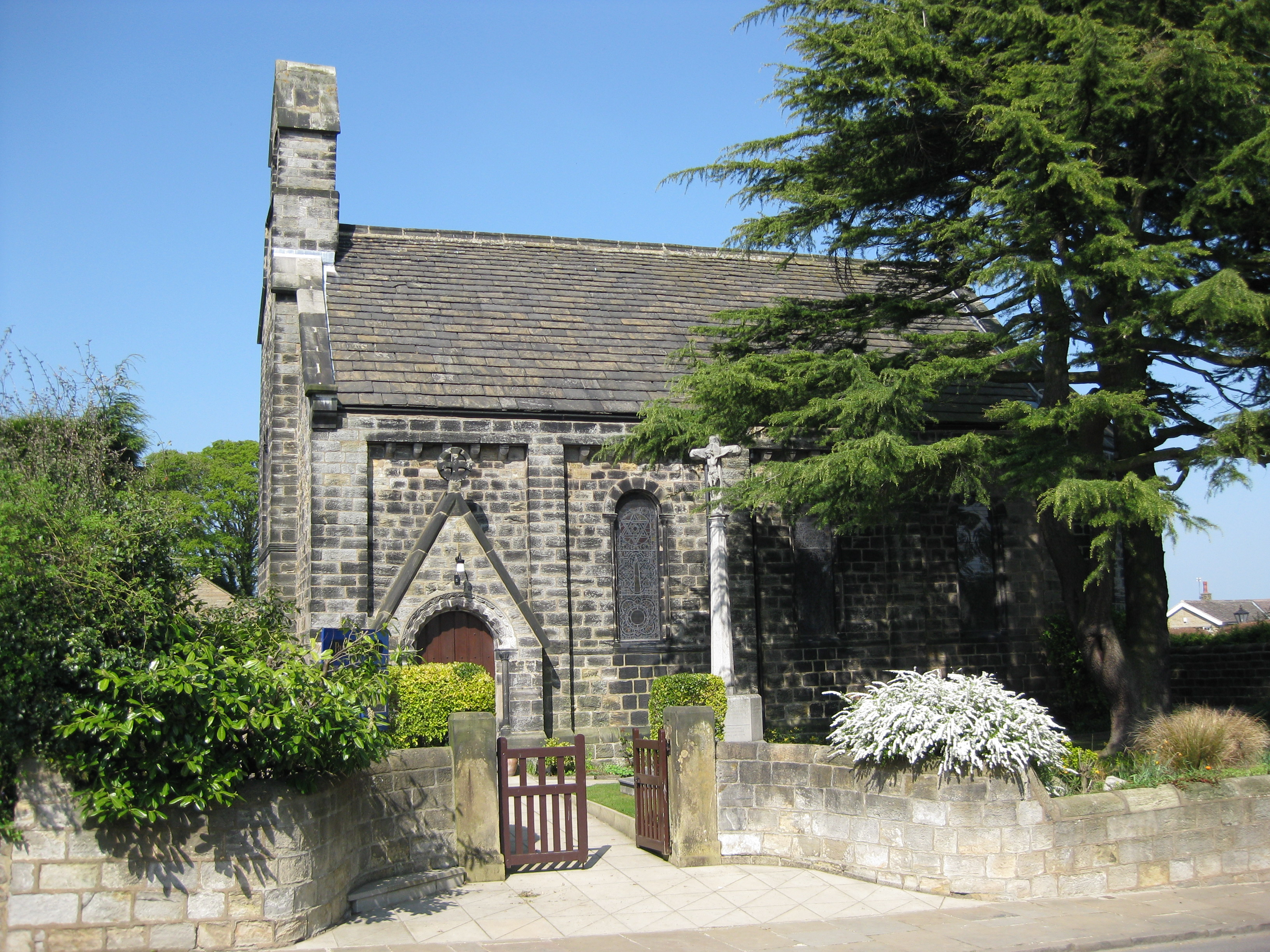
St Paul's Church

The village has two churches. The Church of England parish church is St Paul's, a Grade II listed building from 1842, which replaced a much earlier chapel of ease on Gateland Lane which had been disused and had vanished by then, as stones were taken for other buildings. The Shadwell Methodist Chapel dates from 1892, and replaced the smaller building on the opposite side of the road which was the Methodist Chapel from 1814 to 1892 and is also Grade II. This now serves as a library, which has operated independently since 2013. Other buildings include a primary school, The Red Lion pub, the Village Hall, a social club, a tennis club, a golf club and six shops (clothing shop, beauty shop, dry cleaner, fish and chip shop (itself a Grade II listed building dating from 1637), post-office/newsagent and a hairdresser. There is also a cricket club. Shadwell United is a junior football club which trains at the primary school. There are Scouts, Cubs, Beavers, Guides and Ranger groups.

It is also covered by a local newspaper, the Wetherby News.

== Slaid Hill ==
Slaid Hill is an area of Leeds which is within the manor or traditional estate of Shadwell, but is about half a mile west of Shadwell village with clear countryside between them, and the Shadwell name sign between. Slaid Hill is within the Alwoodley ward of Leeds City Council, whereas Shadwell village sits within the Harewood ward.

Today, Shadwell Parish excludes most of Slaid Hill, but includes the estate to the south of Shadwell Lane and east of Roundhay Park Lane. The 1881 Census makes it clear that the district of Shadwell extended to the west end of Shadwell Lane and to the Moortown Ring Road in the South. In addition Shadwell Grange is a large house and farm in Slaid Hill, with a view over the Moortown Ring Road. It is a Grade II listed building.

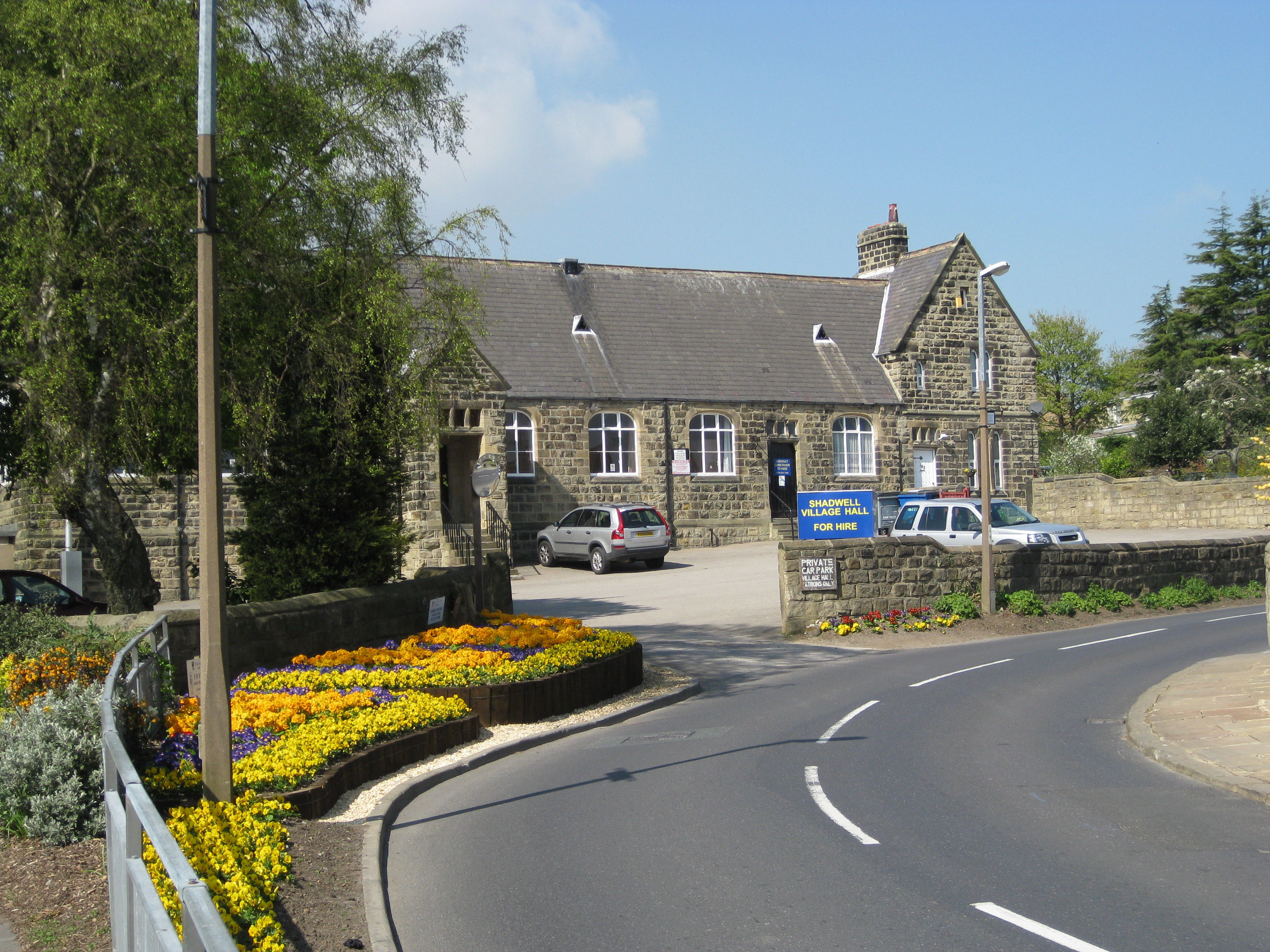
Shadwell Village Hall

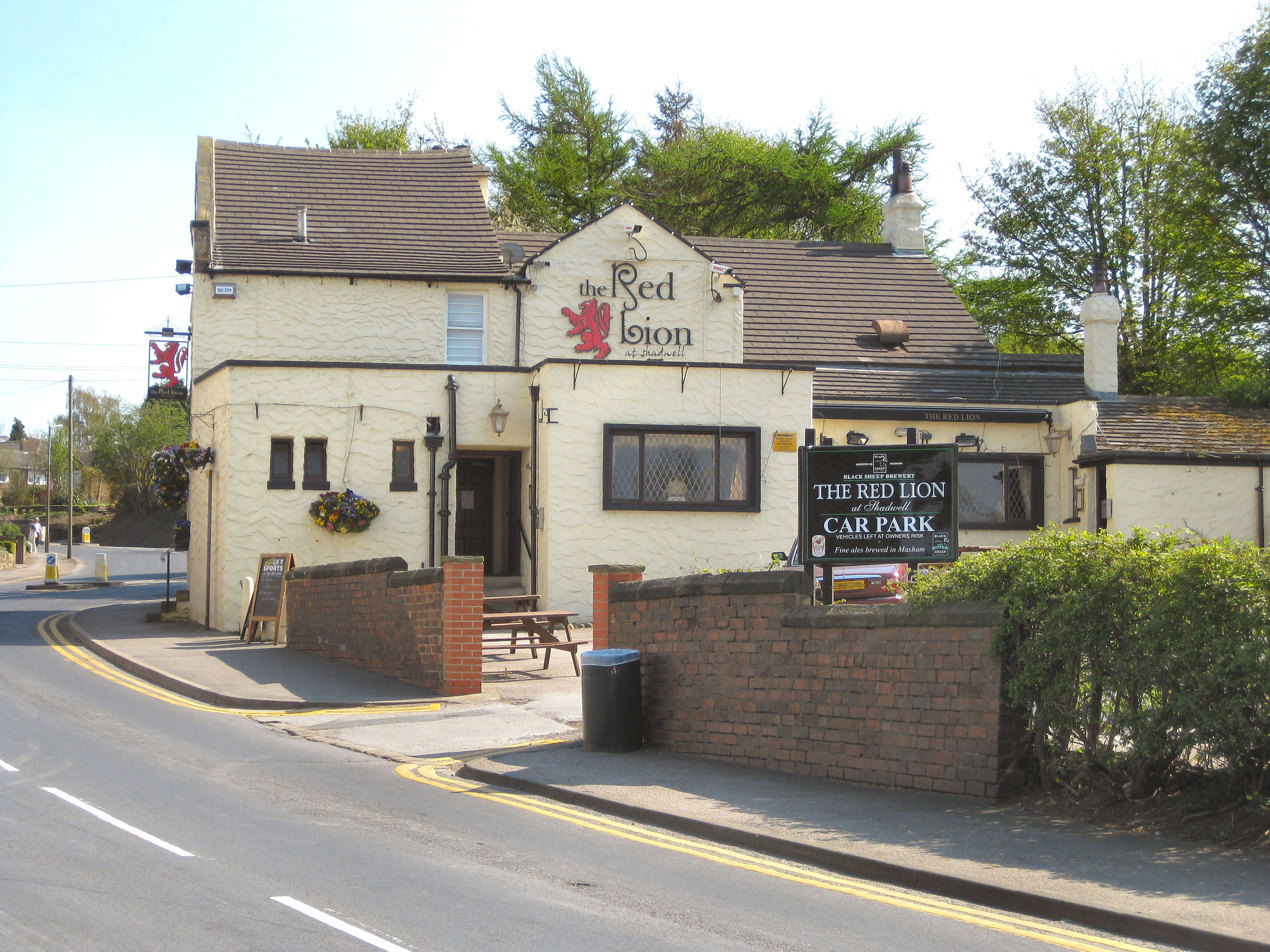
Red Lion

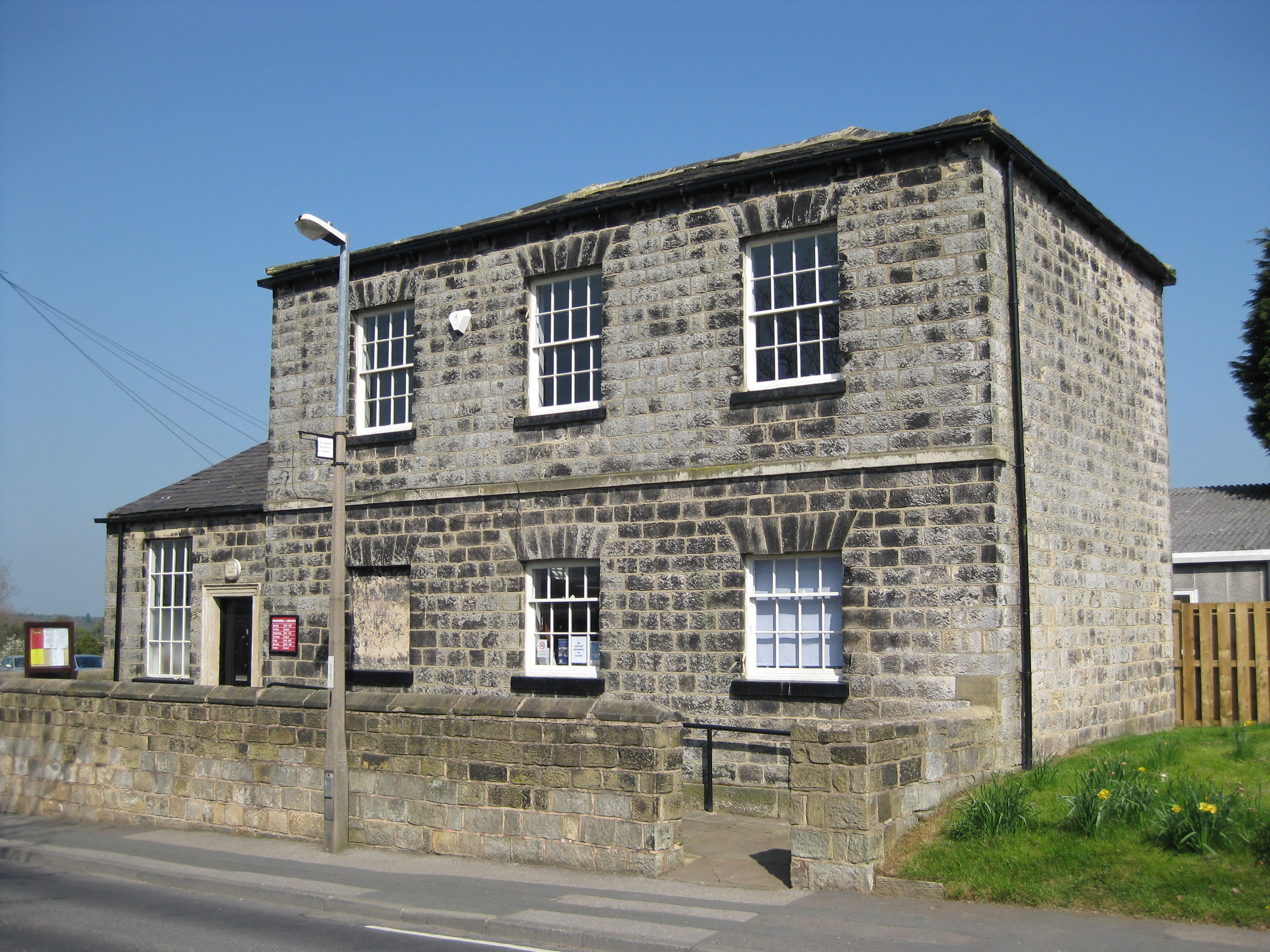
Shadwell Library

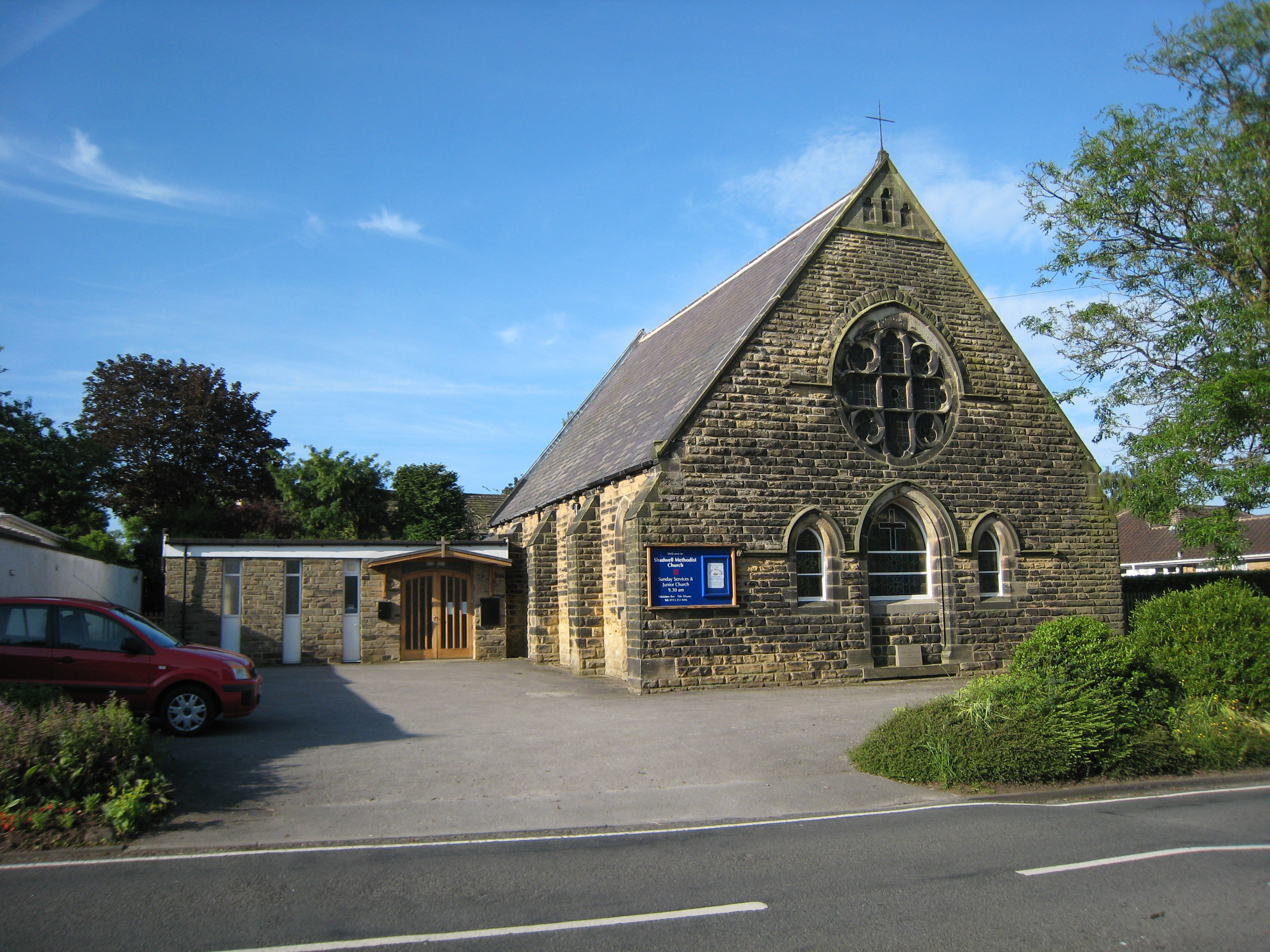
Methodist Church

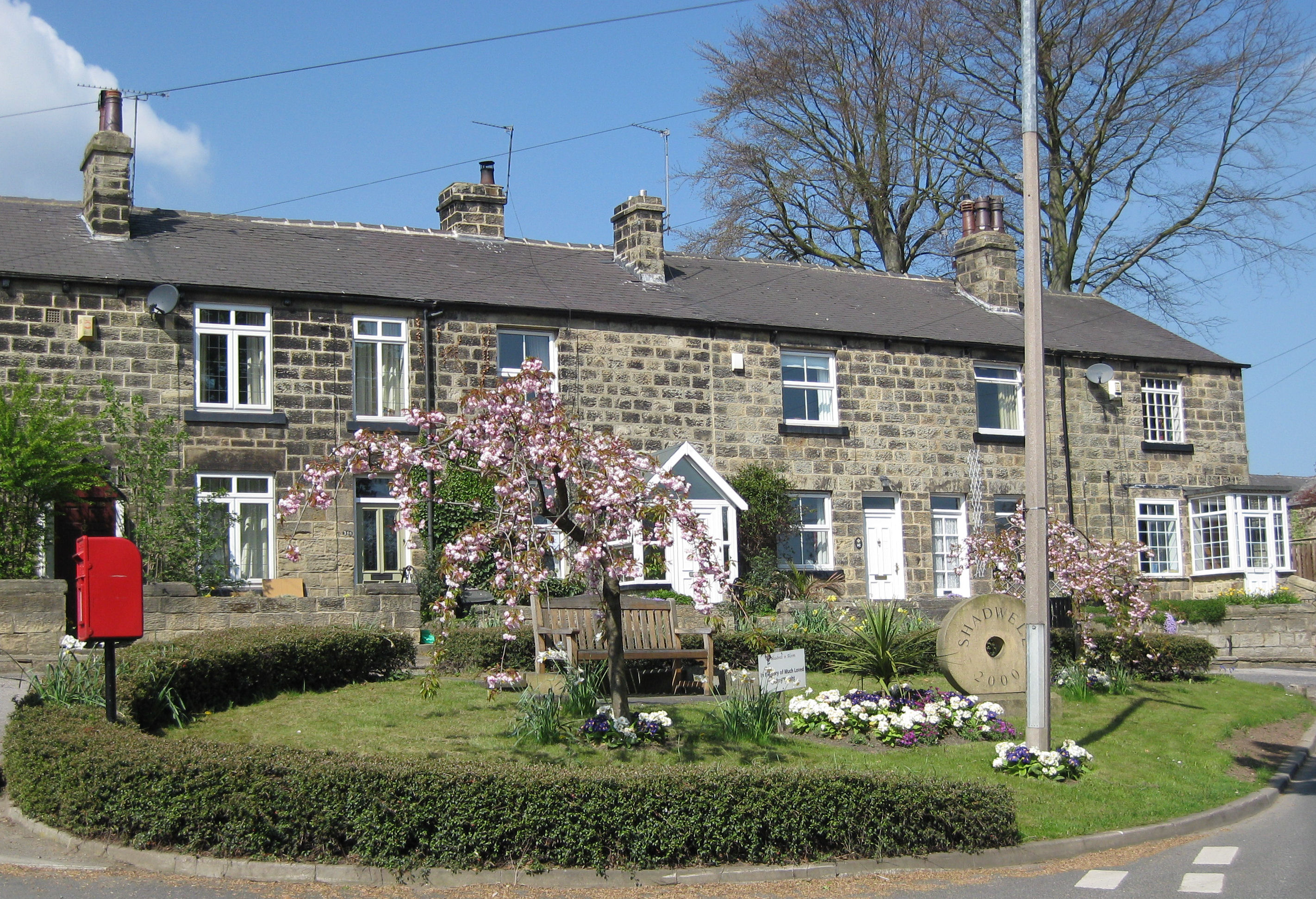
Millennium Wheel and cottages

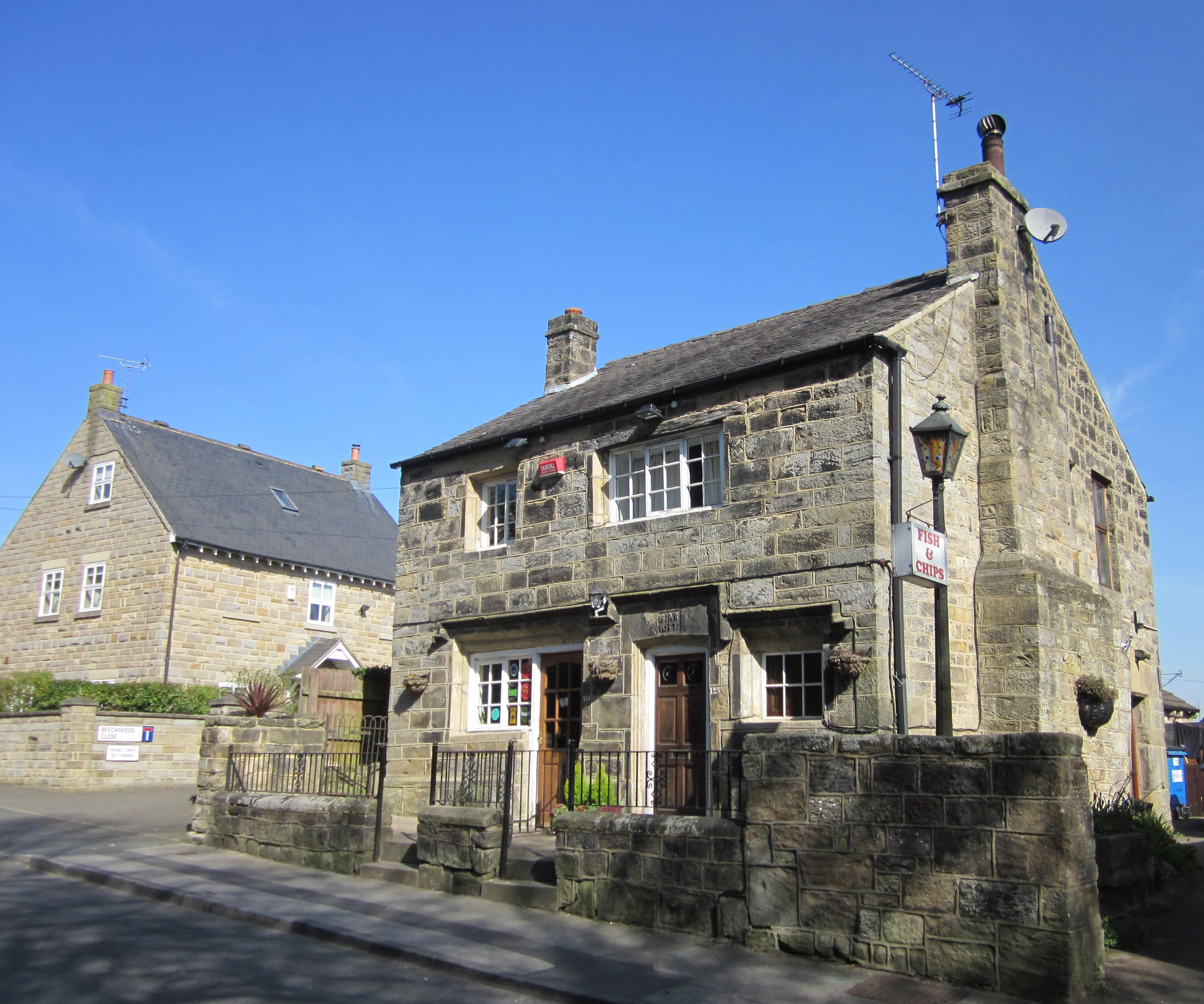
Fish and chip shop

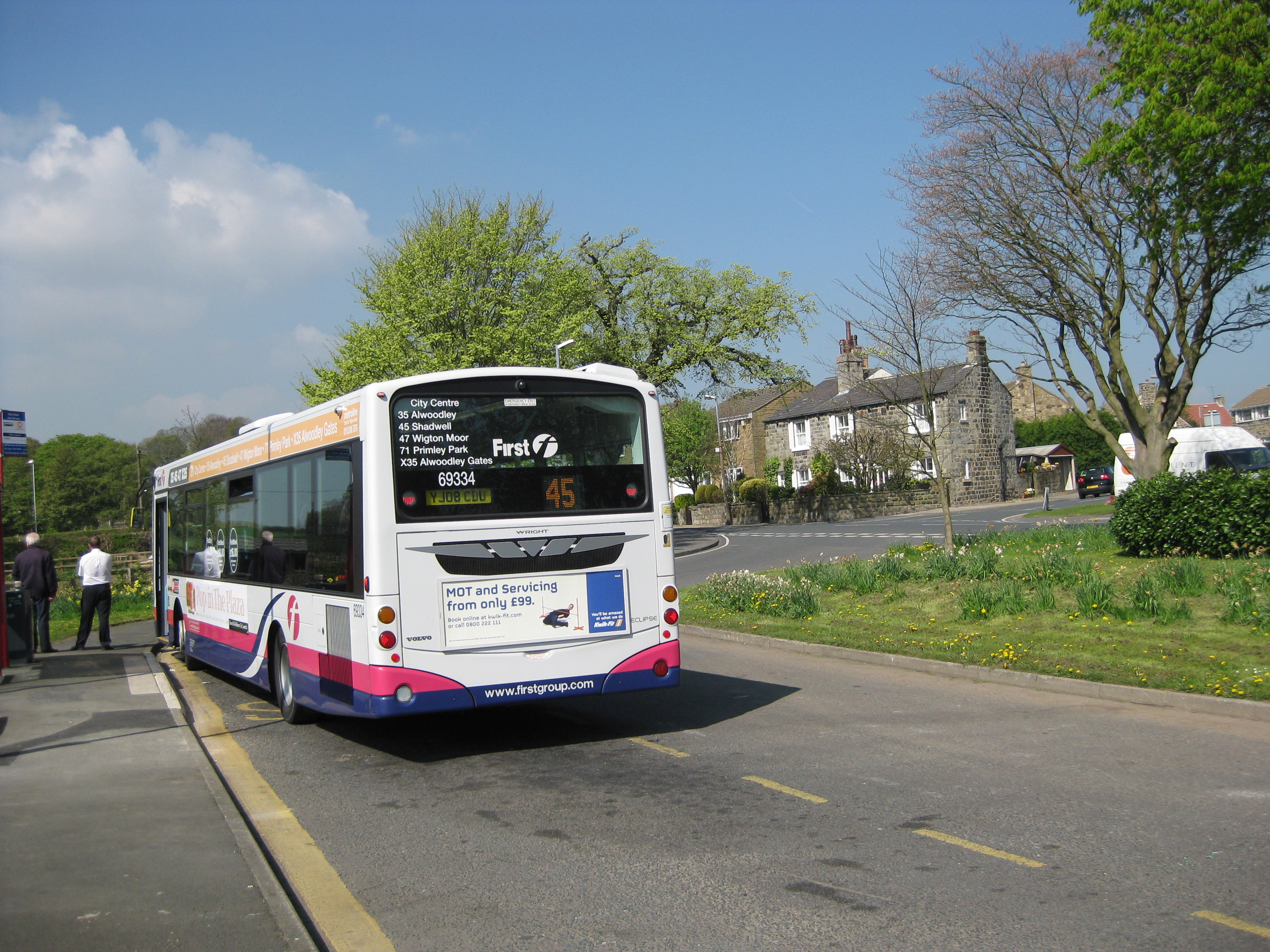
Terminus for the 7S Bus Leeds-Shadwell

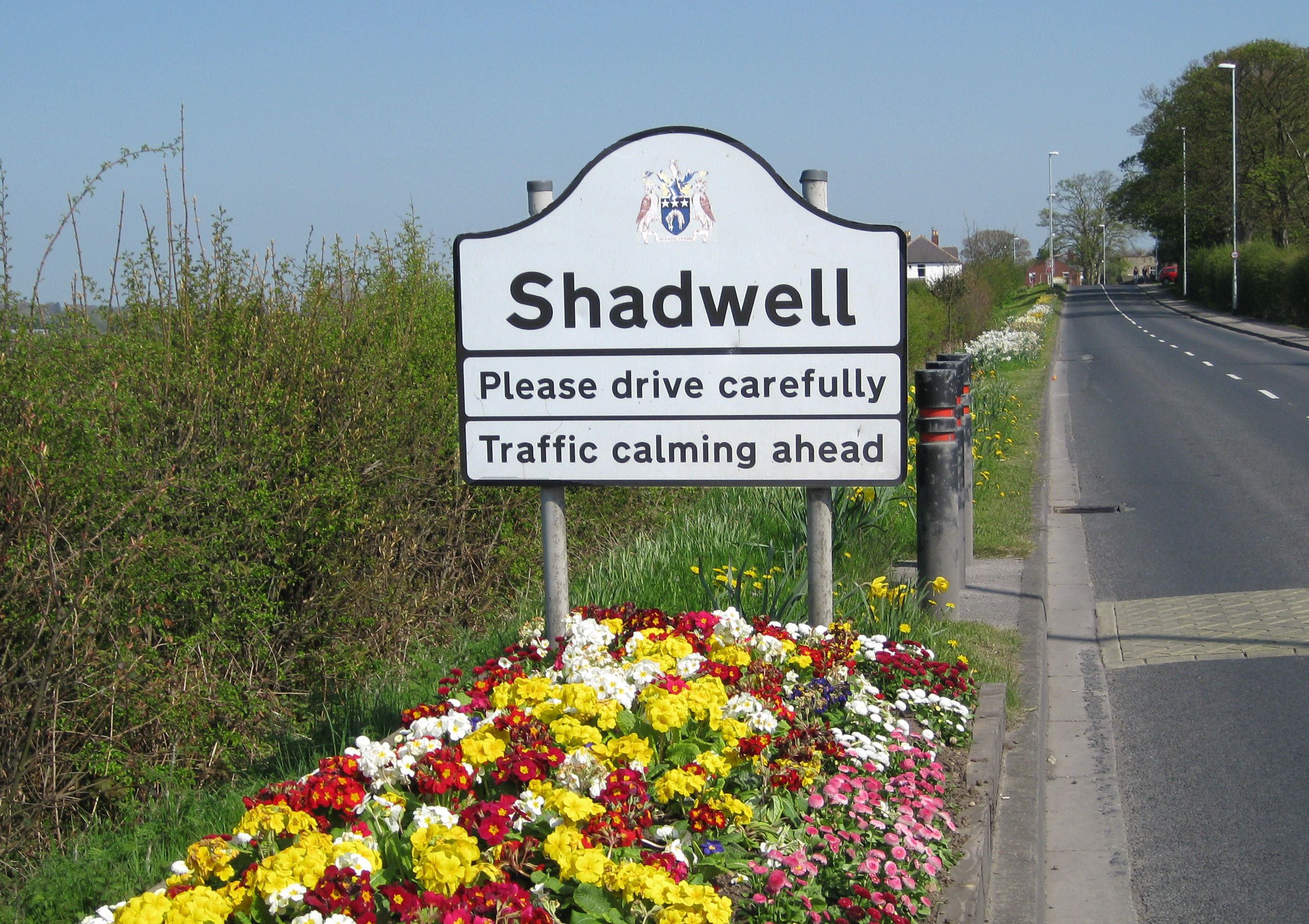
Sign going from Slaid Hill to Shadwell

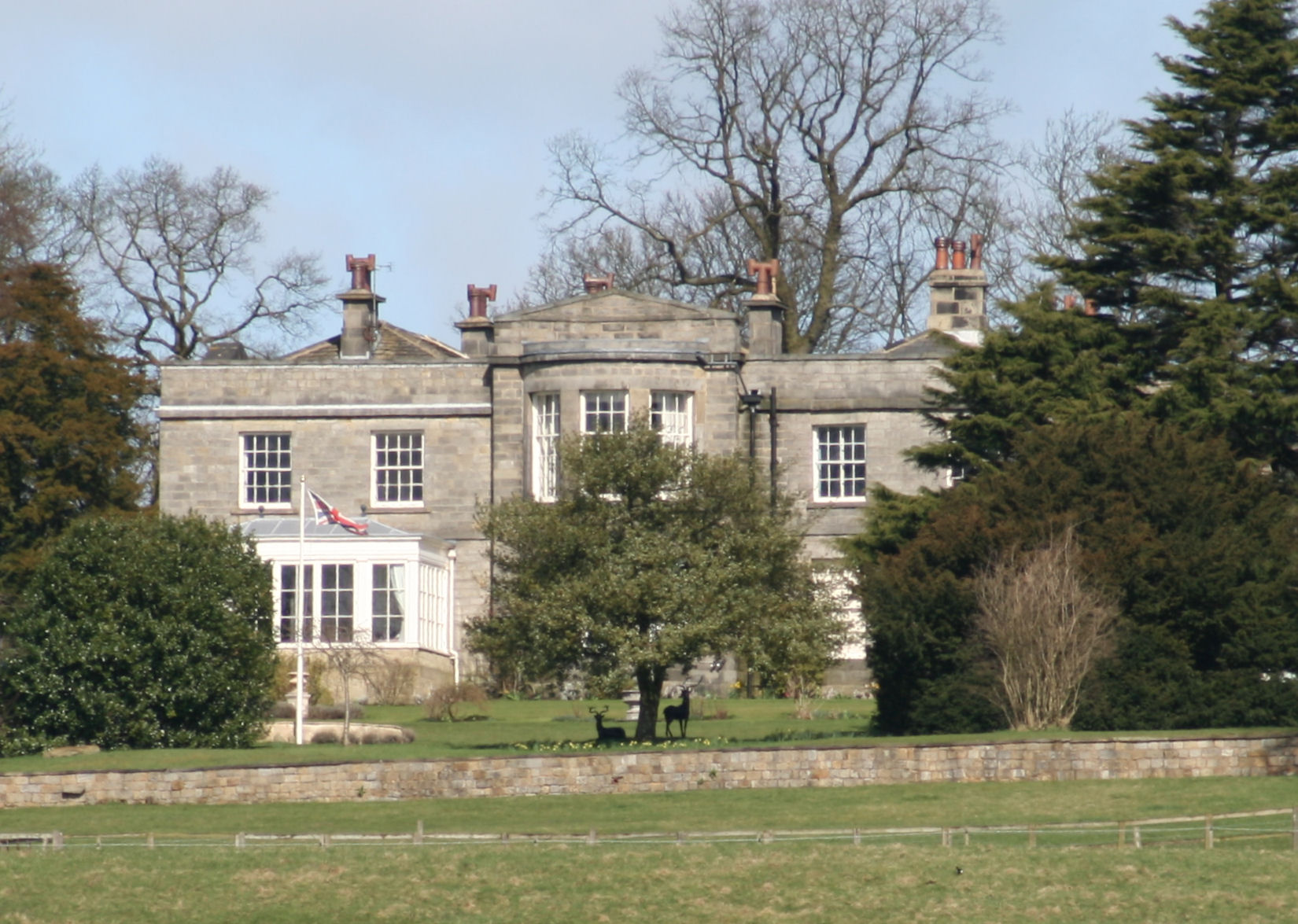
Shadwell Grange viewed from the Leeds Ring Road

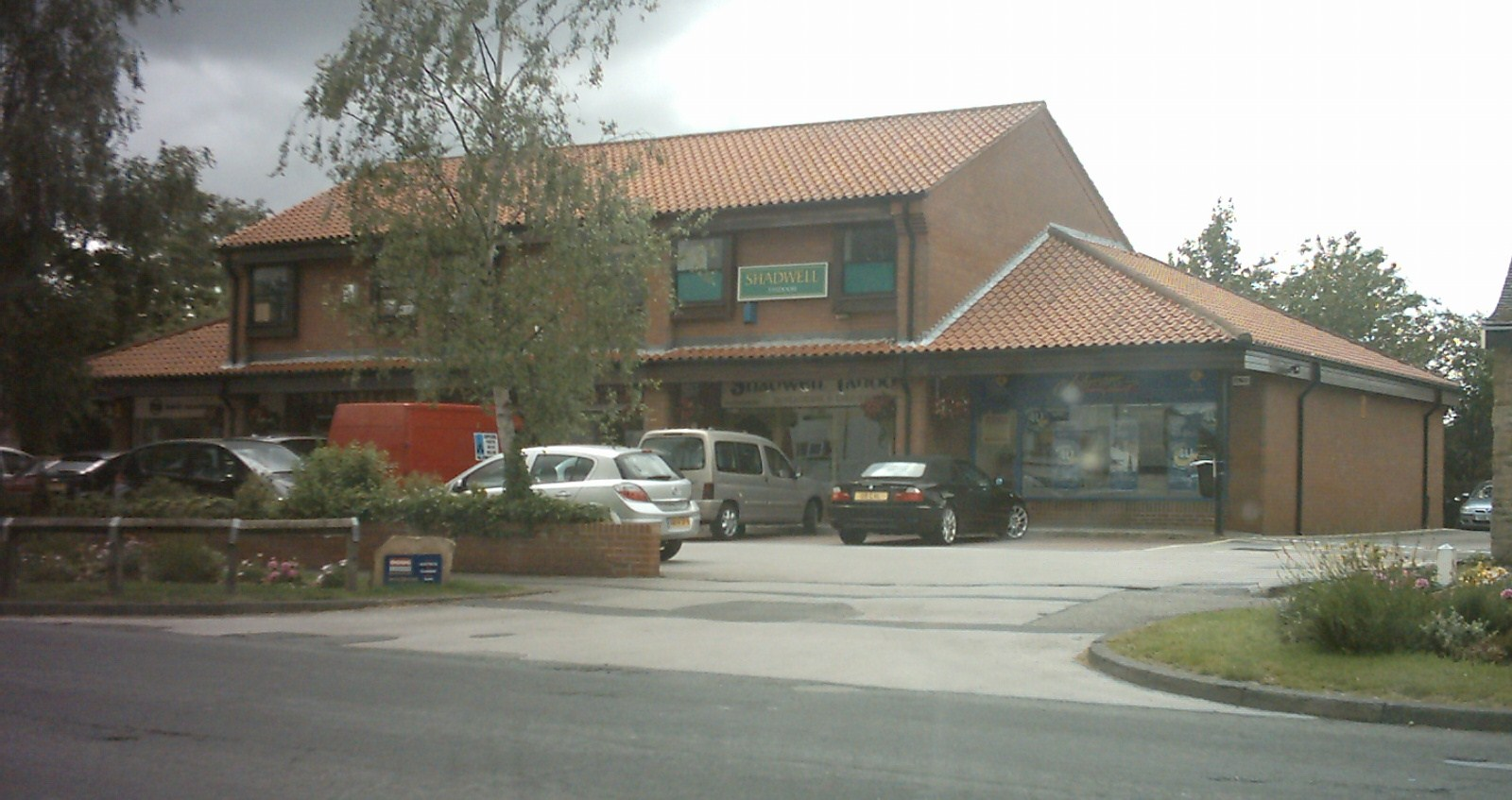
One of the parades of shops in Slaid Hill

== See also ==
- Listed buildings in Shadwell, West Yorkshire
