= Robert Dennis Chantrell =

English architect (1793–1872)

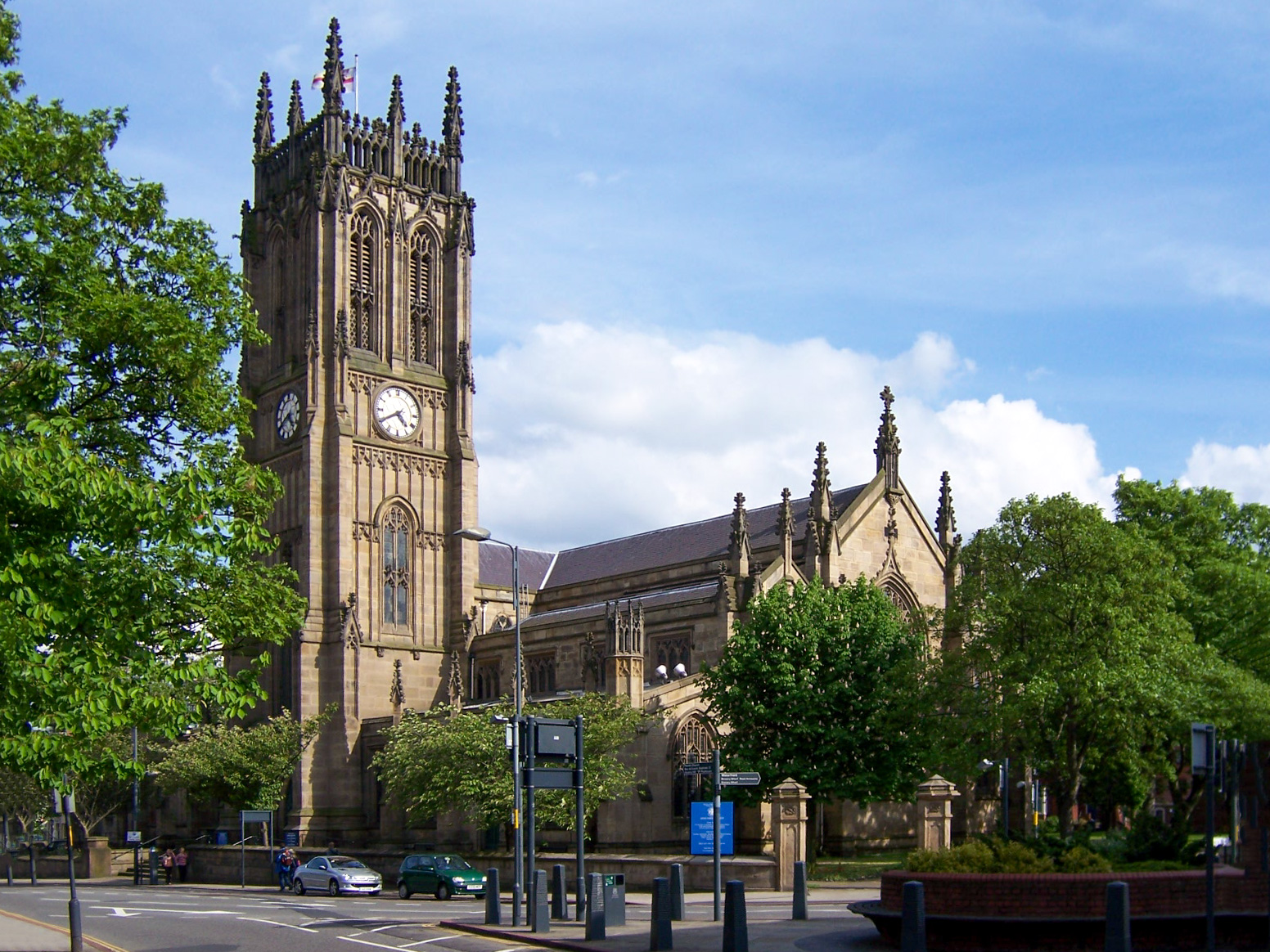
- Minster and Parish Church of Saint Peter-at-Leeds
- Born: 14 January 1793; Newington, Southwark, London.
- Died: 4 January 1872 (aged 78); Norwood, London
- Occupation: Architect
- Buildings: Leeds Minster

Robert Dennis Chantrell (14 January 1793 – 4 January 1872) was an English church architect, best-known today for designing Leeds Parish Church, now Leeds Minster.

== Early life ==
Chantrell was born in Newington, Southwark, London. His father, Robert (1765-1840) had interests in a range of businesses that took the family to Europe, settling in Bruges in 1808. He was a pupil in the office of Sir John Soane from 1807 to 1814, where he learnt the principles of Classical architecture. In 1816, Chantrell moved to Halifax where he assisted the architect William Bradley. In March 1819, Chantrell won the competition to build the Leeds Public Baths and he opened a practice in Leeds.

== Career ==
At the beginning of his career Chantrell designed a string of classical buildings. The Public Baths were single storey with double columns flanking the main door. In May 1819, Chantrell won the competition to design a new hall for the Leeds Philosophical Society, also in a classical design. He went on to design the South Market which included a Neo-classical temple. However, by 1825 he fell out of favour with prominent townsmen.

== Architectural work ==
Surviving buildings by Chantrell include:

- alterations to the Leeds Library, including galleries (1821–36)
- completion of Rudding Park House (c.1824)
- alterations to St Mary-the-Virgin, Hunslet (1826)
- St Stephen's Church, Kirkstall (1828–9)
- Emmanuel Church, Lockwood (1828–29)
- All Saints, Netherthong (1828–9)
- St Peter, Morley (1829–30)
- St Matthew, Holbeck (1829–32)
- partial reconstruction of All Saints, Pontefract (1832–33)
- St Peter-at-Leeds or Leeds Parish Church (now Leeds Minster) (1837–41)
- Christ Church, Skipton (1837–39)
- Christ Church, Lothersdale (1838)
- St Wilfred, Pool-in-Wharfedale (1839)
- the steeple of Holy Trinity, Boar Lane, Leeds (1839)
- the neo-roman tower of the St. Salvator's Cathedral in Bruges, (Belgium) (1839)
- the neo-Norman bellcote of St John the Baptist, Adel (1839)
- St David, Holmbridge (1839–40)
- St Lucius, Farnley Tyas (1840)
- Holy Trinity, Batley Carr (1841–42)
- St Paul, Shadwell (1841–42)
- St Mary, Honley (1843)
- Holy Trinity, Leven (1843)
- St Paul, Denholme Gate (1843–46, with Thomas Shaw)
- All Saints, Roberttown (1844–46, with Thomas Shaw)
- Holy Trinity Church, Cowling (1845)
- St Mary the Virgin's Church, Middleton, Leeds (1846–52)
- the tower of St Paul, Halifax (1847)
- St Andrew, Keighley (1847–48)
- St Paul, Armitage Bridge (1848)
- St George's, New Mills (1829–30)

Surviving buildings restored by Chantrell include:

- St Catherine, Barmby Moor, East Yorkshire (1852)

== Gallery ==
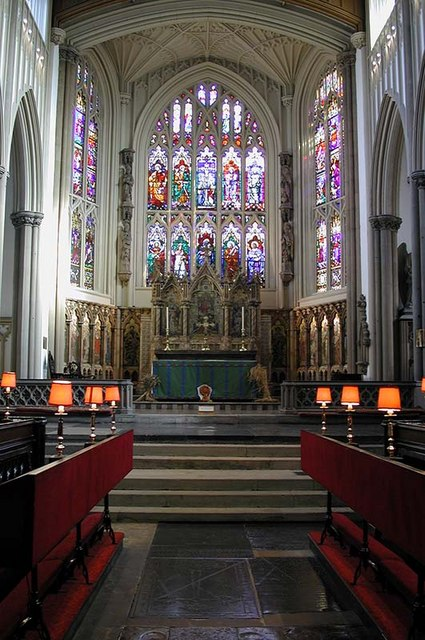
Minster and Parish Church of Saint Peter-at-Leeds

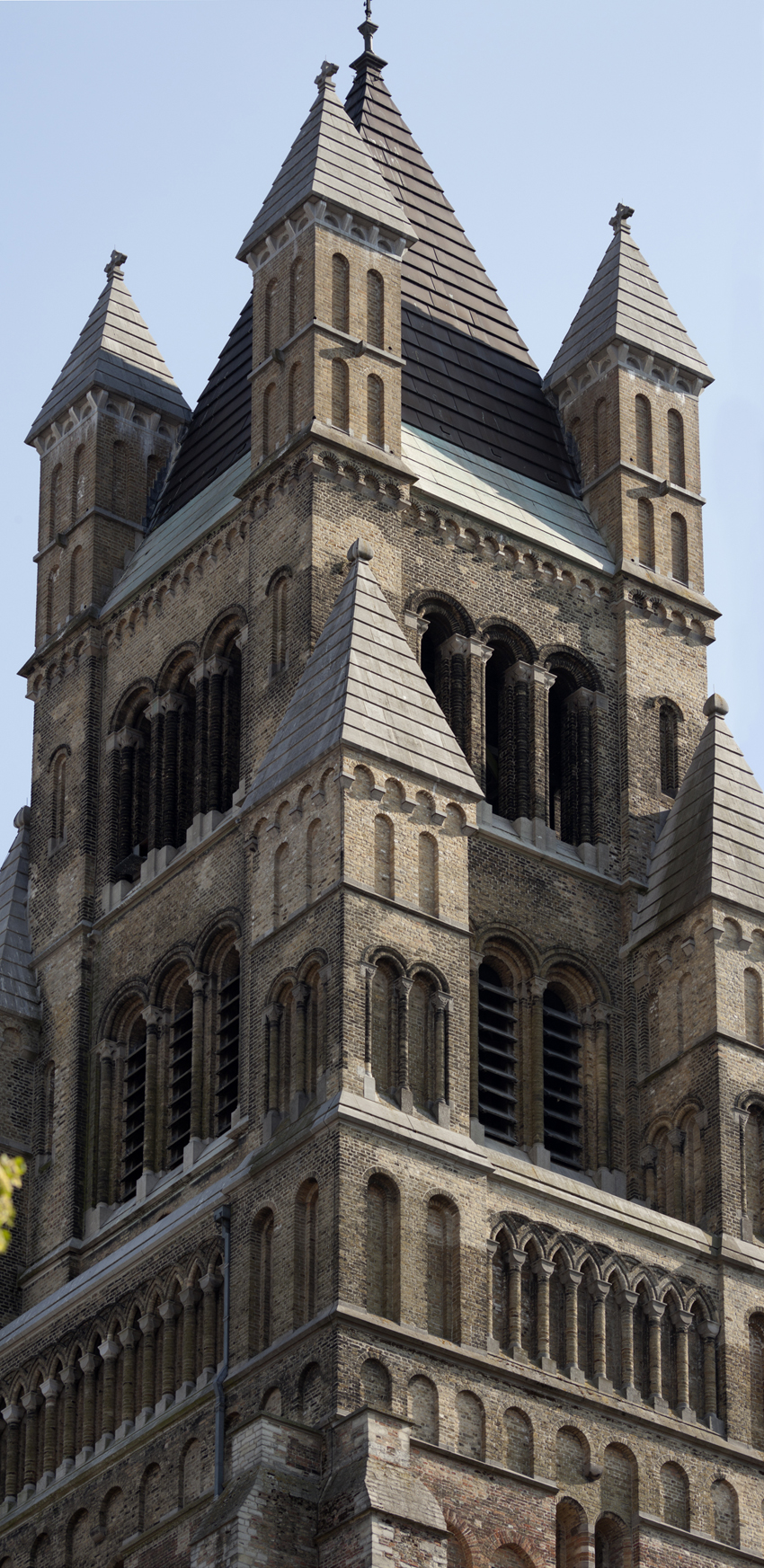
Upper part of the tower by Chantrell of the St. Salvator's Cathedral in Bruges, (Belgium)

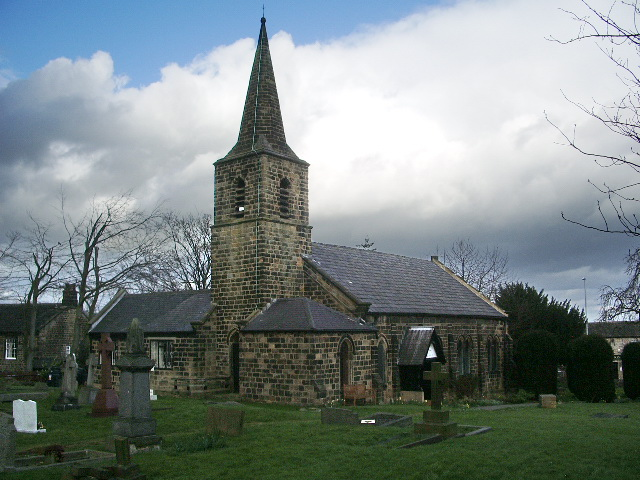
Church of St Wilfrid in Pool-in-Wharfedale

== Sources and literature ==
- Howard COLVIN, Biographical Dictionary of English Architects 1660–1840, John Murray, London, 1954
- Nikolaus PEVSNER & Enid RADCLIFFE Yorkshire: The West Riding, 1959, 2nd edition 1967, Penguin Books, London
- Derek LINSTRUM, West Yorkshire Architects and Architecture, Lund Humphries Publishers, London, 1979, ISBN 0-85331-410-1
- Andries VAN DEN ABEELE & Christopher WEBSTER, Architect Robert D. Chantrell en de kathedraal van Brugge, 1987, Bruges
- Christopher WEBSTER, R.D. Chantrell, architect: his life and work in Leeds 1818–1847, Leeds, 1992
- Christopher WEBSTER & Andries VAN DEN ABEELE, A portentous mass of bastard romanesque frippery: an early ecclesiological export, Leeds, 1999.
- Susan WRATHMELL, & John MINNIS, Leeds, Pevsner Architectural Guides, Yale University Press, New Haven, CT, 2005, ISBN 0-300-10736-6
- Christopher WEBSTER, R. D. Chantrell (1793–1872) and the architecture of a lost generation, Reading, Spire Books, 2010, ISBN 978-1-904965-22-0.
