= Listed buildings in Huddersfield (Newsome Ward – central area) =

Newsome is a ward of Huddersfield in the metropolitan borough of Kirklees, West Yorkshire, England. It contains over 430 listed buildings that are recorded in the National Heritage List for England. Of these, one is listed at Grade I, the highest of the three grades, 17 are at Grade II*, the middle grade, and the others are at Grade II, the lowest grade. The ward is large, and contains the centre of the town of Huddersfield, and areas to the west and south. This list contains the listed buildings in the centre of the town, namely those within the ring road. The listed buildings in the outer areas, those within the ward but outside the ring road, are at Listed buildings in Huddersfield (Newsome Ward - outer areas)

Most of the listed buildings in the central area are houses, shops, offices, public buildings, and associated structures. The other listed buildings include a market cross, public houses and hotels, warehouses, a church, chapels and associated structures, a railway station and structures in the station yard, a railway viaduct, banks, markets, former cinemas, an electrical junction box, and four telephone kiosks.

== Key ==
Grade	Criteria
I	Buildings of exceptional interest, sometimes considered to be internationally important
II*	Particularly important buildings of more than special interest
II	Buildings of national importance and special interest

== Buildings ==
Name and location	Photograph	Date	Notes	Grade
Market Cross; 53.64659°N 1.78227°W		1671	The cross in Market Place is in stone, and consists of an Ionic column on four steps. The base is gadrooned, and near the top is a square die with small swags hanging from volutes, and an achievement on each side. On the top is a ball finial.	II
11–15 Beastmarket; 53.64783°N 1.77998°W	—	18th century	A row of three houses, later altered and used for other purposes, they are in stone with stone gutter brackets and a stone slate roof. There are two storeys and six bays. On the front are 19th-century sash windows, and at the rear are mullioned windows, with some mullions removed, and a staircase window.	II
28 New Street; 53.64564°N 1.78309°W	—	18th century	A stuccoed shop with rusticated quoins, a modillion eaves cornice, and a blocking course. There are three storeys and three bays. In the ground floor is a modern shop front, and the upper floors contain windows in raised surrounds, the left window in the middle floor having a moulded surround.	II
29–35 New Street; 53.64545°N 1.78270°W	—	18th century	A row of stone shops with a stone slate roof. No. 29, which was refronted in the 19th century, is stuccoed, and has a moulded eaves cornice with brackets, and a blocking course with two pediment-shaped acroteria. There are two storeys and two bays. In the ground floor is a modern shop front and the upper floor contains sash windows in moulded surrounds. Nos. 31–35 have three storeys and seven bays, modern shop fronts, and sash windows. At the rear are three-light mullioned casement windows.	II
34 New Street; 53.64540°N 1.78310°W	—	18th century	A stone shop with a modillion eaves cornice and a stone slate roof. There are three storeys and three bays. In the right bay is an elliptical-arched yard entrance with wrought iron gates. To the left is a modern shop front, and the upper floors contain 19th-century windows in plain raised surrounds.	II
Former Fleece public house 53.64700°N 1.78038°W	—	18th century (probable)	The public house, which was altered in the 19th century, is in stone with quoins, stone gutter brackets, and a stone slate roof. There are two storeys and five bays. The doorway has Tuscan pilasters, a fanlight, a moulded cornice on fluted consoles, and a pediment. The windows are sashes in plain raised surrounds.	II
15, 15A and 17 King Street; 53.64592°N 1.78166°W	—	Mid or late 18th century	A range of stone shops with a moulded eaves cornice and a fluted frieze, and a stone slate roof. There are three storeys, five bays, and a relieving arch in the middle bay. The ground floor contains modern shop fronts, and in the upper floors are sash windows.	II
13 Chancery Lane; 53.64648°N 1.78314°W	—	Late 18th century	A gabled warehouse in stone with a stone slate roof. There are four storeys and three bays. In the middle bay are loading doors, and the outer bays contain two-light mullioned sash windows.	II
10 and 12 Kirkgate; 53.64688°N 1.78160°W		18th or early 19th century	A pair of houses, later used for other purposes, they are in stone with a slate roof. There are three storeys and three bays. In the ground floor is a modern shop front, and the upper floors contain sash windows with raised surrounds.	II
24 Kirkgate; 53.64698°N 1.78069°W		18th or early 19th century	A shop on a corner site, in stone, with quoins, a band, an eaves cornice, partly moulded, partly modillioned, and a hipped stone slate roof. There are three storeys and four bays. In the ground floor are modern shop fronts, and the upper floors contain sash windows.	II
4 Macauley Street; 53.64522°N 1.78557°W		Late 18th or early 19th century	Originally a private house, now attached to a public house, it is in stone, with stone gutter brackets and a stone slate roof. There are three storeys and two bays. In the left bay is a doorway with a fanlight and above are sash windows. In each floor of the right bay is a three-light mullioned sash window, the central light taller, and at the rear is a staircase window.	II
7 and 8 Market Place; 53.64679°N 1.78190°W	—	18th or early 19th century	A stone building on a corner site, it has quoins, a modillion eaves cornice, and a hipped slate roof. There are three storeys, and four bays on each front. In the ground floor is a modern shop front, and the upper floors contain sash windows, one of which in Kirkgate is tripartite with a blocked central light.	II
2–10 New Street; 53.64698°N 1.78069°W		18th or early 19th century	A row of stuccoed shops that were resurfaced in the mid 19th century, they have a moulded string course, a modillion eaves cornice, and a stone slate roof. There are three storeys and twelve bays. In the ground floor are modern shop fronts, and the upper floors contain sash windows in moulded surrounds, those in the top floor with moulded panels in aprons.	II
Exchange Buildings; 53.64579°N 1.78421°W		18th or early 19th century	The building is in stone with a hipped slate roof. There are three storeys and an attic, four bays to the left, three gabled bays, and a single bay to the right. In the ground floor are modern shop fronts, and the upper floors contain sash windows. The middle of the gabled bays contains loading doors converted into windows, and in the right bay is an archway with ornamental cast iron gates, over which is a two-light mullioned window.	II
The Plumbers Arms; 53.64529°N 1.78564°W		Late 18th or early 19th century	The public house is in stone, with stone gutter brackets and a stone slate roof. There are three storeys and four bays, and the main doorway has a fanlight. Some windows on the front are single-light sashes, the others are three-light mullioned sash windows with the central light taller, and at the rear are three-light mullioned casement windows.	II
Former White Swan public house 53.64689°N 1.78151°W	—	18th or early 19th century	The former public house is in stone with a slate roof. There are three storeys and four bays. In the ground floor is a doorway with Tuscan pilasters and a segmental pediment. To the left are two windows and an archway, and the upper floors contain sash windows.	II
Arts Centre; 53.64517°N 1.77994°W		1819	Originally a Methodist chapel, it was converted into a theatre in 1994. The building is in stone with a slate roof. There are two storeys, a main block of seven bays, and flanking single-bay wings. The main block has a pediment with an oval oculus in the tympanum. In the centre of the building is a Roman Doric porch with four columns. The windows are sashes, those in the upper storey with round-arched heads, and oblong panels beneath. In the centre is a Venetian window with a blind balustrade and Ionic columns. Each of the outer bays contains a doorway with a moulded surround, a fanlight and a segmental pediment, and above is a round-headed window. The forecourt is enclosed by a dwarf wall with cast iron railings, and it contains three pairs of gate piers, each with panelled sides, moulded tops, and fluted urn finials.	II*
Former Crown Court; 53.64475°N 1.78011°W		1825	The former Court of Requests, later used for other purposes, is in stone with a sill band, a moulded eaves cornice and blocking course, and a hipped slate roof. There are two storeys and five bays, the middle three bays projecting under a pediment containing a blind oculus. Steps lead up to the central Tuscan porch that has a blocking course and sculpted Royal Arms. The windows are sash windows, the central window with a moulded surround.	II
2 Brooks Yard; 53.64657°N 1.78390°W	—	Early 19th century (probable)	The building is in stone with a lean-to stone slate roof. There are three storeys and three bays. Most of the windows are sashes, and outside is paving with stone setts.	II
14 Chancery Lane; 53.64640°N 1.78303°W	—	Early 19th century	A stone warehouse with stone gutter brackets and a stone slate roof, three storeys, and two bays. The left bay contains industrial windows, in the right bay are loading doors, and further to the right is a doorway.	II
9–15 Cloth Hall Street; 53.64588°N 1.78339°W	—	Early 19th century	A row of stone shops with sill bands, stone gutter brackets, and a stone slate roof. There are three storeys and six bays, five of the bays with three-light mullioned sash windows, and the right bay with a single-light sash window. In the ground floor are modern shop fronts.	II
7 Cross Church Street; 53.64659°N 1.78092°W	—	Early 19th century	A stone shop with sill bands, a moulded eaves cornice, three storeys, and two bays. In the ground floor is a modern shop front, and the upper floors contain sash windows.	II
9 Cross Church Street; 53.64655°N 1.78091°W	—	Early 19th century	A stone shop with sill bands, a moulded eaves cornice, three storeys, and two bays. In the ground floor is a modern shop front, and the upper floors contain sash windows.	II
11 Cross Church Street; 53.64649°N 1.78088°W	—	Early 19th century	A stone shop with sill bands, a moulded eaves cornice, three storeys, and two bays. In the ground floor is a modern shop front and a passage entry to the left, and the upper floors contain sash windows.	II
19 Cross Church Street; 53.64627°N 1.78084°W		Early 19th century	A stone shop with sill bands, a moulded eaves cornice, three storeys, and two bays. In the ground floor is a modern shop front. The upper floors are flanked by giant pillasters, and contain sash windows.	II
23 Cross Church Street; 53.64615°N 1.78081°W		Early 19th century	A stone shop with sill bands, a moulded eaves cornice, three storeys, and two bays. In the ground floor is a modern shop front. The upper floors are flanked by giant pillasters, and contain sash windows.	II
25 Cross Church Street; 53.64610°N 1.78082°W		Early 19th century	A stone shop with sill bands, a moulded eaves cornice, three storeys, and two bays. In the ground floor is a modern shop front. The upper floors are flanked by giant pillasters, and contain sash windows.	II
27 Cross Church Street; 53.64604°N 1.78078°W		Early 19th century	A stone shop with a modillion eaves cornice, three storeys, and two bays. In the ground floor is a modern shop front, and the upper floors contain sash windows.	II
29 Cross Church Street; 53.64599°N 1.78077°W		Early 19th century	A stone shop with a modillion eaves cornice, three storeys, and two bays. In the ground floor is a modern shop front, and the upper floors contain sash windows.	II
31 Cross Church Street; 53.64594°N 1.78076°W	—	Early 19th century	A stone shop with a sill band, a modillion eaves cornice, three storeys, and three bays. In the ground floor is a modern shop front, and the upper floors contain sash windows.	II
1 and 1A Goldthorpe's Yard; 53.64533°N 1.77959°W	—	Early 19th century	The building is rendered and has a stone slate roof, two storeys and an attic. The windows are sashes, and there are two doorways, one of which has a timber frame with Tuscan pilasters and a deep entablature. The yard contains stone flags.	II
2 and 3 Goldthorpe's Yard; 53.64532°N 1.77971°W	—	Early 19th century	A pair of houses with moulded iron gutter brackets, a stone slate roof, and two storeys. The windows are single-light sashes and bipartite mullioned sashes. In front of No. 2 are cast iron railings with spear finials.	II
2–6 Half Moon Street; 53.64670°N 1.78551°W	—	Early 19th century	The building is in stone with stone gutter brackets and a hipped slate roof. There are three storeys and seven bays. It contains an archway, and a bay of loading doors, and the windows are sashes.	II
4 King Street; 53.64576°N 1.78237°W		Early 19th century	A stone shop with moulded gutter brackets and a stone slate roof. There are three storeys and two bays. In the ground floor is a modern shop front, and the upper storeys contain sash windows.	II
5 and 7 King Street; 53.64595°N 1.78224°W	—	Early 19th century	A pair of stone shops with a sill band, a moulded eaves cornice, and a stone slate roof. There are three storeys and six bays. In the ground floor is an archway in the right bay, and to the left are modern shop fronts. The upper floors contain sash windows.	II
13 King Street; 53.64592°N 1.78182°W		Early 19th century	A stone shop on a corner site, with a moulded eaves cornice on King Street, stone gutter brackets on Market Walk, and a hipped stone slate roof. There are three storeys, two bays on King Street, and four on Market Walk. In the ground floor is a modern shop front, and the upper floors contain sash windows.	II
35 and 37 King Street; 53.64586°N 1.78079°W	—	Early 19th century	A stone shop on a corner site, with a sill band, stone gutter brackets, and a hipped stone slate roof. There are three storeys, five bays on King Street, two on Cross Church Street, and a curved bay on the corner. In the ground floor is a modern shop front, and the windows in the upper floors are sashes.	II
38 and 38A King Street; 53.64559°N 1.77984°W		Early 19th century	A stone shop with stone gutter brackets and a stone slate roof. There are three storeys and two bays. In the ground floor is a 19th-century shop front, flanked by tapering pilasters with consoles and gablets, and in the centre of the entablature is a small broken pediment. The upper floors contain sash windows.	II
40 and 42 King Street; 53.64556°N 1.77969°W		Early 19th century	The public house is in stone with stone gutter brackets and a stone slate roof. There are three storeys and five bays. In the left bay is an archway, to the right is a modern pub front, and the upper floors contain sash windows. At the rear are two-light mullioned sash windows.	II
44 King Street; 53.64554°N 1.77953°W		Early 19th century	The building is in stone with a sill band, stone gutter brackets, and a stone slate roof. There are three storeys and two bays. In the ground floor is a 19th-century shop front with panelled pilasters and moulded consoles, and the upper floors contain sash windows.	II
46 King Street; 53.64551°N 1.77946°W	—	Early 19th century	A stone shop with a sill band, stone gutter brackets, and a stone slate roof. There are three storeys and two bays. In the ground floor is a 19th-century shop front with panelled pilasters and moulded consoles, and the upper floors contain sash windows. The rear of the building is in brick.	II
48 King Street; 53.64553°N 1.77936°W	—	Early 19th century	A stone shop with a sill band, stone gutter brackets, and a stone slate roof. There are three storeys and three bays. The right bay is slightly recessed, and in the ground floor is a yard entry. To the left is a 19th-century shop front with panelled pilasters and moulded consoles. There is a door in the archway, and the upper floors contain sash windows. The rear of the building is in red brick.	II
49 King Street; 53.64574°N 1.77995°W	—	Early 19th century	A stone shop with stone gutter brackets and a stone slate roof. There are three storeys and two bays. In the ground floor is a modern shop front, and the upper floors contain casement windows.	II
51 King Street; 53.64574°N 1.77989°W	—	Early 19th century	A stone shop with stone gutter brackets and a stone slate roof. There are three storeys and two bays. In the ground floor is a modern shop front, and the upper floors contain sash windows.	II
53 and 55 King Street; 53.64574°N 1.77981°W	—	Early 19th century	A stone shop with stone gutter brackets and a stone slate roof. There are three storeys and two bays. In the ground floor is a modern shop front, and the upper floors contain sash windows.	II
61 and 63 King Street; 53.64570°N 1.77948°W		Early 19th century	The shop has a stone front and is in brick elsewhere. It has stone gutter brackets, a stone slate roof, three storeys and four bays. In the ground floor is a 19th-century shop front with panelled pilasters and massive consoles flanking a modillioned fascia, and the upper floors contain sash windows.	II
42–48 New Street; 53.64513°N 1.78328°W	—	Early 19th century	A pair of rendered shops with rusticated quoins, stone gutter brackets, and a stone slate roof. There are three storeys and seven bays. In the ground floor are modern shop fronts, and the upper floors contain sash windows.	II
52 New Street; 53.64494°N 1.78335°W	—	Early 19th century	A stone shop with quoins on the right, stone gutter brackets, and a stone slate roof. There are three storeys and one bay. In the ground floor is a modern shop front, and above are two-light mullioned sash windows.	II
56 New Street; 53.64486°N 1.78339°W	—	Early 19th century	A stone shop with stone gutter brackets, and a stone slate roof. There are three storeys and two bays. In the left bay is an archway, and above are sash windows with moulded surrounds. The right bay contains a modern shop front and two-light mullioned sash windows above.	II
58A New Street; 53.64488°N 1.78357°W	—	Early 19th century	The building is in stone with a stone slate roof. There are two storeys and four bays. The windows are sashes.	II
61 New Street; 53.64476°N 1.78301°W	—	Early 19th century	A rendered shop with a moulded eaves cornice and a blocking course. There are three storeys and two bays. In the ground floor is a modern shop front, and above are sash windows. In the middle floor the windows are tripartite with pilasters and a moulded cornice, and in the top floor they have segmental heads, moulded surrounds and keystones.	II
6–10 Queen Street; 53.64537°N 1.78033°W	—	Early 19th century	A pair of shops flanking a yard entrance, they are in stone, with stone gutter brackets, and a stone slate roof. There are three storeys and five bays. In the ground floor are modern shop fronts, and the upper floors contain sash windows.	II
12 and 14 Queen Street; 53.64530°N 1.78024°W	—	Early 19th century	A pair of stone houses with a sill band, a dentilled cornice, and a hipped slate roof. There are three storeys, one bay on Queen Street, six in Queen's Square, and a rounded corner between. On the front are two doorways, each with pilasters, a fanlight, and a dentilled swan-neck pediment, and the windows are sashes.	II
16 and 18 Queen Street; 53.64500°N 1.78016°W	—	Early 19th century	A pair of stone houses with a sill band, a dentilled cornice, and a hipped slate roof. There are three storeys, two bays on Queen Street, six in Queen's Square, and a rounded corner between. On the front are two doorways, each with panelled pilasters, a fanlight, and a dentilled swan-neck pediment, and the windows are sashes.	II
20 Queen Street; 53.64462°N 1.78018°W	—	Early 19th century	A house at the end of a terrace, later an office, in painted stone, with a sill band, stone eaves brackets, and a slate roof. There are three storeys and two bays, and the windows are sashes. On the front are two doorways, one with a semicircular fanlight, and the other with an oblong fanlight and a cornice.	II
22 Queen Street; 53.64455°N 1.78015°W	—	Early 19th century	A house in a terrace, later an office, in painted stone, with a moulded eaves cornice, and a blocking course. There are three storeys and a basement, and two bays, and the windows are sashes. Three steps with cast iron railings lead up to the doorway that has Tuscan three-quarter columns, and an entablature. To the left is a doorway with a semicircular fanlight, and the basement area is enclosed by cast iron railings.	II
24 Queen Street; 53.64449°N 1.78015°W	—	Early 19th century	A house in a terrace in painted stone, with a moulded eaves cornice, and a blocking course. There are three storeys and two bays, and the windows are sashes. Three steps with cast iron railings lead up to the doorway that has Tuscan three-quarter columns and an entablature.	II
26 Queen Street; 53.64443°N 1.78013°W	—	Early 19th century	A house in a terrace in painted stone, with a moulded eaves cornice, and a blocking course. There are three storeys and two bays, and the windows are sashes. Three steps with cast iron railings lead up to the doorway that has Tuscan three-quarter columns and an entablature. The area is enclosed by cast iron railings.	II
28 Queen Street; 53.64439°N 1.78012°W	—	Early 19th century	A house in a terrace in painted stone, with a moulded eaves cornice, and a blocking course. There are three storeys and a basement, and two bays. The windows are sashes, the window in the ground floor tripartite. Three steps with cast iron railings lead up to the doorway that has Tuscan three-quarter columns and an entablature. The basement area is enclosed by cast iron railings.	II
30 Queen Street; 53.64431°N 1.78011°W	—	Early 19th century	A house in a terrace, later an office, in painted stone, with a moulded eaves cornice, and a blocking course. There are three storeys and a basement, and two bays, and the windows are sashes. Three steps with cast iron railings lead up to the doorway that has Tuscan three-quarter columns and an entablature. The basement area is enclosed by cast iron railings.	II
32 Queen Street; 53.64427°N 1.78011°W	—	Early 19th century	A house at the end of a terrace, later an office, in painted stone, with a moulded eaves cornice, and a blocking course. There are three storeys and two bays. In the ground floor is a later bow window, and the other windows are sashes. Three steps with cast iron railings lead up to the doorway that has Tuscan three-quarter columns and an entablature.	II
1–7 Station Street; 53.64728°N 1.78364°W	—	Early 19th century	A pair of stone shops, with a moulded cornice over the ground floor, a band over the second floor, and a moulded eaves cornice. There are four storeys and seven bays. In the ground floor are modern shop fronts, between which is a passageway door with a fanlight and a fluted frieze. The upper floors contain sash windows, those in the top floor with round-arched heads and sunk aprons.	II
Gates and railings to alley, Station Street; 53.64745°N 1.78337°W	—	Early 19th century	The gates at the entrance to the alley and the railings flanking it are in cast iron. They have delicate ornamentation in Gothic style.	II
1 and 2 Union Bank Yard; 53.64504°N 1.78355°W	—	Early 19th century	A stone building with a sill band, stone gutter brackets and a stone slate roof. There are three storeys and five bays. The doorway has a wooden frame with Tuscan pilasters and a dentilled cornice, and some of the windows are sashes. The yard contains stone flags and setts.	II
3 Union Bank Yard; 53.64503°N 1.78382°W	—	Early 19th century	A stone building with a sill band, stone gutter brackets and a stone slate roof. There are three storeys and six bays. The doorway has a wooden frame with Tuscan pilasters and a dentilled cornice, and some of the windows are sashes. The yard contains stone flags and setts.	II
6 and 7 Union Bank Yard; 53.64512°N 1.78385°W	—	Early 19th century	A stone building with two storeys and three bays. The doorway has a stone surround, and a cornice on tall consoles, and the windows are sashes. The yard contains stone flags and setts.	II
1A Upper Head Row; 53.64681°N 1.78592°W	—	Early 19th century	A stone building with bands, a moulded eaves cornice, a blocking course, and a hipped stone slate roof. There are three storeys and one bay. The doorway has an oblong fanlight, and the windows are sashes.	II
1 Wormald's Yard; 53.64559°N 1.77990°W	—	Early 19th century	The entry to a yard, it is in stone, with stone gutter brackets, a stone slate roof, three storeys, and one bay. The entry is in the ground floor, and above are sash windows. At the rear is a stair window, and in the yard are stone setts.	II
2 Wormald's Yard; 53.64551°N 1.77985°W	—	Early 19th century	The house is in red brick, with stone gutter brackets, a stone slate roof, three storeys, and one bay. The windows are two-light mullioned sashes, and in the yard are stone setts.	II
3 Wormald's Yard; 53.64549°N 1.77985°W	—	Early 19th century	A stone house with a moulded iron gutter, a stone slate roof, two storeys, and one bay. The windows are sashes, and in the yard are stone setts.	II
4 Wormald's Yard; 53.64544°N 1.77986°W	—	Early 19th century	A stone house with a moulded iron gutter, a stone slate roof, two storeys, and one bay. The windows are sashes, the doorway has a fanlight, and in the yard are stone setts.	II
5 Wormald's Yard; 53.64540°N 1.77987°W	—	Early 19th century	A stone house with a moulded iron gutter, a stone slate roof, two storeys, and one bay. The windows are sashes, the doorway has a fanlight, and in the yard are stone setts.	II
6 Wormald's Yard; 53.64532°N 1.77988°W	—	Early 19th century	The house is rendered, and has a stone slate roof, two storeys, and two bays. The windows are mullioned sashes, with two and three lights in the upper floor, and four in the ground floor. In the yard are stone setts.	II
7 and 8 Wormald's Yard; 53.64533°N 1.78001°W		Early 19th century	A pair of rendered houses with stone gutter brackets, a stone slate roof, three storeys, and three bays. The doorways are in the centre, the windows are mullioned sashes with three lights, and in the yard are stone setts.	II
Rear part, Burns Tavern; 53.64589°N 1.78074°W	—	Early 19th century	The building is in stone, with a sill band, a modillion eaves cornice, and a stone slate roof. There are three storeys and two bays, and the windows are sashes.	II
Commercial Hotel; 53.64463°N 1.78344°W		Early 19th century	The hotel is on a corner site, and is in stone, with stone gutter brackets and a hipped stone slate roof. There are three storeys, a symmetrical front of three bays, and one bay and a two-storey extension in High Street. The central doorway has a moulded surround, the windows on the front are sashes, and on High Street is a mix of sash and casement windows.	II
Department of Social Services; 53.64796°N 1.78196°W	—	Early 19th century	An office block in stone with quoins, floor bands, a modillion eaves cornice, and a blocking course. There are three storeys and a basement, and a front of seven bays, the middle three bays projecting under a pediment with an oval oculus in the tympanum. These bays form an arcade with moulded voussoirs and a moulded impost band. In the middle bay is a round-arched doorway with rusticated jambs and voussoirs. The windows are sashes, those in the middle floor of the middle bay with moulded surrounds and cornices.	II
Former Globe public house 53.64578°N 1.78012°W	—	Early 19th century	The public house, later used for other purposes, is in stone with stone gutter brackets and a stone slate roof. There are two storeys and four bays. In the ground floor is a shop front with pilasters, a doorway to the left with an open segmental pediment, and an archway to the right. The windows are sashes with plain raised surrounds.	II
Hammonds Yard; 53.64534°N 1.77937°W	—	Early 19th century	Along the east side of the yard are a group of four stone buildings, with one or two storeys. Most of the windows are sashes, and one building has industrial windows and a balcony approached by wooden steps. Much of the yard is paved with stone setts, and cobbles.	II
Imperial Court; 53.64547°N 1.78451°W		Early 19th century	Originally part of the Queen Hotel, later offices, it is built in stone with stone gutter brackets, and a hipped stone slate roof. There are three storeys and ten bays. In the ground floor is a doorway, the left bay contains a square-headed archway to Queen Tap Yard, and in the right bay is a segmental-headed archway to Imperial Arcade with cast iron gates. The upper floors contain sash windows, and in front of the six left bays in the middle floor is a balcony with an ornamental cast iron balustrade.	II
Juvenile Court; 53.64335°N 1.78264°W	—	Early 19th century	A stone building with quoins, a moulded eaves cornice, and a hipped slate roof. There are two storeys and three bays. The central porch has blocked Tuscan pilasters and a full entablature, and the windows are sashes.	II
Former premises of F. McShane Limited; 53.64654°N 1.78344°W	—	Early 19th century	An office in stone, with a sill band, a moulded eaves cornice, a blocking course, and a stone slate roof. There are two storeys and three bays. Steps lead up to a central doorway that has an oblong fanlight, and the windows are sashes.	II
The Old Warehouse; 53.64639°N 1.78723°W	—	Early 19th century	The warehouse is in stone, the ground floor rusticated, with a sill band, a moulded eaves cornice, and a stone slate roof. There are three storeys and seven bays. The central doorway has a semicircular fanlight, and the windows are sashes, those in the ground floor with round-arched heads and sunk and moulded aprons. At the rear is a bay of loading doors, and the area is enclosed by cast iron railings with spear and gadrooned finials.	II
Warehouse, Brooks Yard; 53.64657°N 1.78383°W	—	Early 19th century	The warehouse is in stone, with stone gutter brackets and a stone slate roof. There are three storeys and four bays, consisting of two bays of casement windows, one bay of industrial windows, and one bay of loading doors. There are two doorways with oblong fanlights, and outside are stone setts.	II
Former Zetland public house 53.64429°N 1.77929°W	—	Early 19th century	The former public house is in stone, the ground floor rusticated, with a full entablature and blocking course, and a hipped slate roof. There are three storeys and three bays. The central doorway is in a segmental-headed recess and has a moulded surround, and the ground floor windows also have segmental heads. In the upper floors are four pairs of giant Tuscan pilasters, and the windows are sashes.	II
St Peter's Church; 53.64729°N 1.78099°W		1834–36	The church was designed by J. P. Pritchett in Perpendicular style, and is built in stone with a slate roof. It consists of a nave, north and south aisles embracing a west tower, a south transept, and a chancel flanked by polygonal vestries. The tower has six stages, with a west doorway, a three-light window, diagonal buttresses rising to crocketed pinnacles, clock faces on all sides, and a parapet with openwork battlements. On the body of the church are embattled parapets, and the east window has five lights.	II*
6 Beastmarket; 53.64734°N 1.77982°W	—	Early or mid 19th century	The building is in stone with a moulded eaves cornice and blocking course, and a hipped slate roof. There are three storeys and one bay. In the ground floor is a modern shop front, and above are sash windows.	II
7 and 9 Beastmarket; 53.64752°N 1.77992°W	—	Early or mid 19th century	A stone building with a sill band, a moulded eaves cornice, and a hipped stone slate roof. There are three storeys and three bays. Steps lead up to a doorway with a fanlight, and the windows are sashes.	II
44 Bradley Street; 53.64476°N 1.77838°W	—	Early or mid 19th century	A stone house at the end of a row, with a moulded eaves cornice, and a slate roof. There are two storeys and two bays. A doorway with an entablature has been converted into a window, and the other windows are sashes.	II
46 Bradley Street; 53.64469°N 1.77835°W	—	Early or mid 19th century	A stone house in a row, with a moulded eaves cornice, and a hipped slate roof. There are two storeys and three canted bays. In the middle bay is a doorway with a fanlight and an entablature, and the windows are casements.	II
20 Cross Church Street; 53.64652°N 1.78059°W	—	Early or mid 19th century	A stone shop with a stone slate roof, three storeys, and two bays. In the ground floor is a modern shop front, the middle floor contains former loading doors converted into windows, and in the top floor are sash windows.	II
22 Cross Church Street; 53.64647°N 1.78058°W	—	Early or mid 19th century	A stone shop with a stone slate roof, three storeys, and two bays. In the ground floor is a modern shop front, and the upper floors contain sash windows.	II
24 Cross Church Street; 53.64643°N 1.78057°W	—	Early or mid 19th century	A stone shop with a stone slate roof, three storeys, and two bays. In the ground floor is a modern shop front, and the upper floors contain sash windows.	II
4 Kirkgate; 53.64680°N 1.78185°W	—	Early or mid 19th century	A stone shop with a slate roof, three storeys and two bays. In the ground floor is a modern shop front, and the upper floors contain sash windows.	II
6 Kirkgate; 53.64684°N 1.78177°W	—	Early or mid 19th century	A stone shop with a slate roof, three storeys and three bays. In the ground floor is a modern shop front, and the upper floors contain sash windows in plain raised surrounds.	II
8 Kirkgate; 53.64682°N 1.78166°W	—	Early or mid 19th century	A stone shop with a slate roof, three storeys and two bays. In the ground floor is a modern shop front, and the upper floors contain sash windows; in the left bay they have moulded surrounds, the lower window also with a cornice.	II
26 Kirkgate; 53.64697°N 1.78051°W		Early or mid 19th century	A stone shop with a moulded eaves cornice and a blocking course. There are three storeys and two bays. In the ground floor is a modern shop front and the upper floors contain sash windows in plain raised surrounds.	II
33 and 35 Kirkgate; 53.64726°N 1.77981°W		Early or mid 19th century	A stone building on a corner site, with a moulded eaves cornice, a blocking course, and a hipped slate roof. There are three storeys and a basement, four bays on Kirkgate, a rounded corner, and three bays on Beastmarket. The doorway has a moulded surround, a fanlight and a moulded cornice, the windows are sashes, and the basement area is enclosed by plain railings.	II
37–41 Kirkgate; 53.64726°N 1.77958°W		Early or mid 19th century	The hotel is in stone, with a moulded eaves cornice and a blocking course. There are three storeys and a basement, and six bays. In the ground floor are three doorways with fanlights, and shop windows, and above them is a full entablature with Tuscan pilasters. The upper floors contain sash windows, and the basement area is enclosed by plain cast iron railings.	II
17 Lord Street; 53.64815°N 1.78048°W	—	Early or mid 19th century	A stone shop on a corner site, with a moulded eaves cornice, a blocking course, and a hipped slate roof. There are two storeys and two bays. In the ground floor is a doorway with Tuscan pilasters and a full entablature, and a shop window. The upper floor contains sashes.	II
19 Lord Street; 53.64819°N 1.78051°W	—	Early or mid 19th century	A stone shop in a row, with a moulded eaves cornice, a blocking course, and a hipped slate roof. There are two storeys and three bays. In the ground floor is a doorway with Tuscan pilasters and a full entablature, to the left is a shop window, and further to the left is a passage door with a blind fanlight. The upper floor contains sashes.	II
21 Lord Street; 53.64824°N 1.78053°W		Early or mid 19th century	A stone shop on a corner site, with a moulded eaves cornice, a blocking course, and a hipped slate roof. There are two storeys, two bays on Lord Street, one bay on St Peter's Street, and a curved bay on the corner. In the ground floor is a doorway with Tuscan pilasters and a full entablature, to the left is a shop window, in the corner bay is a doorway, and there is another shop window in St Peter's Street. The upper floor contains sashes.	II
4 and 6 Market Place; 53.64667°N 1.78269°W	—	Early or mid 19th century	A pair of shops with a sill band, a modillioned eaves cornice, and a slate roof. There are three storeys and five bays. The windows are sashes, in the ground floor are modern shop fronts, and in the left bay, which projects slightly, is an archway paved with wooden setts.	II
13 New Street; 53.64598°N 1.78251°W		Early or mid 19th century	A shop on a corner site that was remodelled in 1925, it is in stone, with sill bands, and a moulded eaves cornice with an entablature. There are three storeys, seven bays in King Street, three in New Street, and a curved bay on the corner. In the ground floor is a colonnade of fluted Greek Doric columns carrying an entablature, and a cornice of Vitruvian scroll containing lions' heads. The upper floors contain sash windows.	II
3 Southgate; 53.64809°N 1.77931°W	—	Early or mid 19th century	A stone house in a terrace, with a sill band, a modillion eaves cornice, a blocking course, and a slate roof. There are two storeys and two bays. The doorway in the left bay has a fanlight containing lettering, the windows are sashes, and the area is enclosed by cast iron railings.	II
5 Southgate; 53.64814°N 1.77933°W	—	Early or mid 19th century	A stone house in a terrace, with a sill band, a modillion eaves cornice, a blocking course, and a stone slate roof. There are two storeys and three bays. The doorway in the middle bay has a fanlight, above it is a blind window, and the other windows are sashes. The right bay contains an archway with moulded voussoirs, and the area is enclosed by cast iron railings.	II
7 Southgate; 53.64818°N 1.77938°W	—	Early or mid 19th century	A stone house in a terrace, with a sill band, a modillion eaves cornice, and a stone slate roof. There are two storeys and two bays. The doorway in the left bay has a fanlight, above it is a blind window, and the other windows are sashes.	II
9 Southgate; 53.64823°N 1.77941°W	—	Early or mid 19th century	A stone house in a terrace, with a sill band, a moulded eaves cornice, a blocking course, and a stone slate roof. There are two storeys and two bays. The doorway in the right bay has a fanlight, and the windows are sashes.	II
11 Southgate; 53.64827°N 1.77942°W	—	Early or mid 19th century	A stone house in a terrace, with a sill band, a moulded eaves cornice, a blocking course, and a stone slate roof. There are two storeys and a basement, and two bays. The doorway in the right bay has a fanlight, the windows are sashes, and the basement area is enclosed by cast iron railings.	II
10 St Peter's Street; 53.64828°N 1.78049°W	—	Early or mid 19th century	A stone house in a terrace, later used for other purposes, with a moulded eaves cornice, a blocking course, and a slate roof. There are two storeys and two bays. The doorway has Tuscan pilasters, a fanlight, and a full entablature, and the windows are sashes, the window in the ground floor with a moulded surround.	II
12 St Peter's Street; 53.64829°N 1.78038°W	—	Early or mid 19th century	A stone house in a terrace, later used for other purposes, with a moulded eaves cornice, a blocking course, and a slate roof. There are two storeys and two bays. The doorway has Tuscan pilasters, a fanlight, and a full entablature, and the windows are sashes, the window in the ground floor with a moulded surround.	II
14 St Peter's Street; 53.64831°N 1.78026°W	—	Early or mid 19th century	A stone house in a terrace, later used for other purposes, with a sill band, a moulded eaves cornice, a blocking course, and a slate roof. There are two storeys and three bays. In the ground floor is a shop front with Tuscan pilasters and an entablature, and the upper floor contains sash windows.	II
26 St Peter's Street; 53.64835°N 1.78009°W	—	Early or mid 19th century	A stone house in a terrace, with a moulded eaves cornice, a blocking course, and a slate roof. There are two storeys and two bays. The doorway has Tuscan pilasters and an entablature, and the windows are sashes, the window in the ground floor with a moulded surround.	II
28 St Peter's Street; 53.64835°N 1.78004°W	—	Early or mid 19th century	A stone house in a terrace, with a moulded eaves cornice, a blocking course, and a slate roof. There are two storeys and two bays. The doorway has a fanlight, Tuscan pilasters and an entablature, and the windows are sashes.	II
36 St Peter's Street; 53.64842°N 1.77956°W	—	Early or mid 19th century	A shop on a corner site, it is in stone, with a moulded eaves cornice, a blocking course, and a hipped slate roof. There are two storeys, four bays on St Peter's Street, two on Southgate, and a rounded bay on the corner. In the ground floor are two shop fronts with Tuscan surrounds and modillion entablatures, and two doorways, one with a fanlight. The windows are sashes.	II
14 Victoria Lane; 53.64540°N 1.78185°W		Early or mid 19th century	A stone shop on a corner site, with a moulded eaves cornice, a blocking course, and a hipped slate roof. There are three storeys, three bays on Victoria Street, six on Lockwood's Yard, and a rounded bay on the corner. In the ground floor is a modern shop front, the window are sashes, and in Lockwood's Yard is a bay of loading doors.	II
16 and 16A Victoria Lane and 12, 14 and 16 Market Avenue; 53.64523°N 1.78188°W	—	Early or mid 19th century	A block of stone shops on a corner site, with an eaves cornice partly moulded and partly modillioned, a blocking course, and a hipped slate roof. There are three storeys, three bays on Victoria Avenue and seven on Market Avenue. In the ground floor are modern shop fronts, the windows above are sashes, and there is a bay of loading doors on Market Avenue.	II
20 Zetland Street; 53.64479°N 1.77925°W	—	Early or mid 19th century	A house, later used for other purposes, in stone, with a moulded eaves cornice, a blocking course, and a slate roof. There are two storeys and a basement, a front of two bays, and the windows are sashes. The doorway has a moulded surround, a fanlight, and a full entablature, and to the left is a blocked passage door with a blind semicircular fanlight and moulded imposts. The basement area is enclosed by cast iron railings.	II
24 Zetland Street; 53.64472°N 1.77920°W	—	Early or mid 19th century	A stone house with a moulded eaves cornice, a blocking course, and a slate roof. There are two storeys and two bays, and the windows are sashes. The doorway has a moulded surround, a fanlight, and an entablature, and to the left is a passage doorway with a blind semicircular fanlight and moulded imposts.	II
33 Zetland Street; 53.64449°N 1.77891°W		Early or mid 19th century	A stone building on a corner site, it has a sill band, a moulded eaves cornice, and a hipped slate roof. There are two storeys, three bays on Zetland Street, one on Queensgate, and a curved bay on the corner. The windows are sashes. In the corner bay is a doorway, and on Zetland Street is a doorway converted into a window, both with fanlights and entablatures.	II
Boy and Barrel Inn; 53.64734°N 1.77982°W		Early or mid 19th century	The public house is in stone, with a moulded eaves cornice, a blocking course, and a slate roof. There are three storeys, three bays, and an extension to the northeast with a canted corner. In the ground floor is a 19th-century wooden public house front, over which is a moulded cornice, and the upper floors contain sash windows. On the blocking course is an over-lifesize figure of a boy sitting astride a barrel holding a lantern.	II
Former College Arms public house 53.64448°N 1.77876°W	—	Early or mid 19th century	The former public house is in stone, with a moulded eaves cornice, a blocking course, and a slate roof. There are two storeys and four bays. The doorway has a moulded wooden frame, a fanlight and an entablature, and to the right is a shop window with a moulded wooden frame and an entablature. The other windows are sashes.	II
The Vulcan Public House; 53.64834°N 1.77993°W		Early or mid 19th century	The public house at the end of a terrace is in stone, with a moulded eaves cornice, a blocking course, and a slate roof. There are two storeys and three bays. The doorway has Tuscan pilasters, a fanlight, and an entablature, and the windows are sashes.	II
9 Bath Street; 53.65069°N 1.78526°W	—	1838	Originally a meeting hall, it is in stone with a string course, a moulded eaves cornice and blocking course, a parapet, and a slate roof. There are three storeys and five bays, the middle three bays slightly projecting under a pediment. Steps with wrought iron handrails lead up to a central doorway with an architrave, a rectangular fanlight, and a cornice hood. The windows are sashes, and the middle window in the top floor has a round-arched head, an architrave, voussoirs and a keystone. In the ground floor are two doorways with plain surrounds.	II
Huddersfield Railway Viaduct; 53.65088°N 1.78307°W		1845–47	The viaduct is in stone, with tapering piers and a coped parapet. It consists of 18 round arches and 26 segmental arches, with a flat iron span over John William Street. The arches over the other principal roads have rusticated voussoirs and buttresses.	II
Former Butchery Department, Co-operative Stores; 53.64342°N 1.78304°W		1846	Originally a school, later used for other purposes, the building is in stone with an inscribed parapet. There are two storeys and three bays, and in the ground floor is a modern shop front. The bays of the upper floor are flanked by corbelled-out embattled finials, and in the central bay is a canted oriel window containing mullioned and transomed lights, and a parapet with pierced quatrefoils. The outer bays contain mullioned and transomed windows with hood moulds.	II
Huddersfield railway station 53.64844°N 1.78451°W		1846–50	The station building was designed by J. P. Pritchett in Classical style. It is built in sandstone with tile roofs, and consists of a central two-storey block with eleven bays, flanking single-storey wings with nine bays each, ending in projecting single-storey five-bay pavilions. The central block has a Composite pilastade with a dentilled and modillioned entablature. Projecting from it is a portico with six columns, and a tympanum containing a clock. The wings have an open Composite colonnade, and each pavilion has a portico with a parapet in front and balustrades at the sides. The other station buildings include a detached eleven-bay block to the north, the booking office, the parcels office, and platform buildings.	I
Railings, Station Yard; 53.64888°N 1.78387°W	—	1846–50 (presumed)	The railings run in two sections from the north pavilion of the station building to the George Hotel. They are in cast iron on a stone plinth, and have an elaborate pattern.	II
George Hotel; 53.64861°N 1.78342°W		1848–50	The hotel, which was designed by William Wallen, is in sandstone with a rusticated ground floor, moulded quoins, moulded string courses, a moulded eaves cornice with console-shaped triglyphs, and a slate Mansard roof. There are four storeys and attics, seven bays on the front and three on the sides. The windows are sashes; on the ground floor they have vermiculated quoins and keystones, in the first floor they have moulded surrounds and full entablatures, the central window has a segmental pediment, and two outer windows have triangular pediments. The attic contains seven dormers with casements and segmental pediments. On the right return, the middle window in the first floor has a balcony with a balustrade of intersecting circles, and a badge with Saint George in relief.	II*
36 New Street; 53.64534°N 1.78314°W	—	1850	A stone shop with a sill band, and a projecting eaves cornice with paired modillions. There are three storeys and three bays. In the ground floor is a modern shop front. The outer windows in the middle floor have plain surrounds, and the middle window has a moulded surround and a cornice on brackets. In the top floor the windows are separated by piers with deep grooves.	II
11 Brook Street; 53.64963°N 1.78238°W	—	Mid 19th century	A shop in stone, with a sill band, a moulded eaves cornice, and a hipped slate roof. There are three storeys and four bays. In the ground floor is an entry, with two shop fronts to the right and a moulded cornice above. The upper floors contain sash windows, those in the middle floor with segmental heads and keystones.	II
5–9 Brooks Yard; 53.64649°N 1.78368°W	—	Mid 19th century	A row of stone houses with a stone slate roof. There are two storeys and four bays. The windows are sashes, and outside is paving with stone setts.	II
13–17 Brook Street; 53.64966°N 1.78220°W	—	Mid 19th century	A stone shop with a sill band, a double chamfered eaves cornice, three storeys and six bays. In the centre is a portal containing two doorways with pointed fanlights, over which is a frieze with quatrefoils, and a bracketed moulded cornice with ornamental iron cresting. Flanking the doors are chamfered pilasters containing glazed tiles, and between them is a pink granite column. In the ground floor are two shop windows, and the upper floors contain sash windows, those in the middle floor with blind pointed fanlights containing quatrefoils.	II
13–18 Byram Street; 53.64835°N 1.78197°W	—	Mid 19th century	A block of stone shops on a corner site, with rusticated quoins, sill and impost bands, a moulded eaves cornice on gadrooned brackets, and a hipped slate roof. There are three storeys and a basement, ten bays on Byram Street and five on St Peter's Street. In the ground floor are shop windows over which are round-arched windows with rusticated voussoirs, jambs and keystones, four of which are Venetian with Tuscan piers and entablatures. In the middle floor are round-ached windows and in the top floor are segmental-arched windows, some of which are paired, all with moulded voussoirs and keystones.	II
23 Byram Street; 53.64932°N 1.78252°W	—	Mid 19th century	An office block on a corner site, it is in stone on a moulded plinth, with rusticated quoins on the ground floor, a string course, a moulded eaves cornice on brackets, a blocking course, and a hipped roof. There are three storeys and a basement, and six bays on each front. Steps lead up to the doorway that has a segmental-arched fanlight. The windows are sashes, those in the ground floor with segmental-arched heads and moulded voussoirs, and those in the upper floors with moulded surrounds.	II
5–9 Chancery Lane; 53.64662°N 1.78315°W	—	Mid 19th century	A stone warehouse with stone gutter brackets, four storeys and seven bays. The middle bay contains loading doors, in the second bay is a doorway with an oblong fanlight, and elsewhere are casement windows.	II
14 Cross Church Street; 53.64664°N 1.78066°W	—	Mid 19th century	A stone shop with paired eaves brackets, and a stone slate roof. There are three storeys and one bay. In the ground floor is a modern shop front, and the upper floors contain sash windows.	II
16 Cross Church Street; 53.64660°N 1.78066°W	—	Mid 19th century	A stone shop with paired eaves brackets, and a stone slate roof. There are three storeys and one bay. In the ground floor is a 19th-century shop front, and the upper floors contain sash windows.	II
18 Cross Church Street; 53.64657°N 1.78064°W	—	Mid 19th century	A stone shop with paired eaves brackets, and a stone slate roof. There are three storeys and one bay. In the ground floor is a modern shop front, and the upper floors contain sash windows.	II
5–9 Dundas Street; 53.64557°N 1.78543°W	—	Mid 19th century	A stone building with quoins, a moulded eaves cornice, and a slate roof. There are three storeys and a semi-basement, and ten bays. The windows are sashes, in the top floor with segmental heads, with moulded surrounds in the middle floor, round arches, vermiculated voussoirs and a continuous moulded impost band in the ground floor, and segmental heads in the basement.	II
72 and 78 Fitzwilliam Street; 53.65024°N 1.78480°W	—	Mid 19th century	A pair of stone houses in a terrace, with a moulded eaves cornice, a blocking course, and a slate roof. There are two storeys, and each house has two bays. The windows are sashes with moulded surrounds, and the doorways have fanlights, Tuscan piers, entablatures and blocking courses. Between the doorways is a round-arched passage entry with a chamfered surround.	II
82 Fitzwilliam Street; 53.65017°N 1.78521°W		Mid 19th century	An office building in stone with quoins, moulded string courses, a moulded eaves cornice, a blocking course, a tall parapet with pilasters, and a hipped slate roof. There are three storeys and five bays. In the centre is a round-arched doorway with a cable-moulded surround, foliate impost blocks, voussoirs, and a moulded cornice. The windows are round-arched with pointed hood moulds, and they are paired in the middle bay. In the top floor they form an arcade separated by colonnettes with crocketed capitals, and between them are blind spaces.	II
84 Fitzwilliam Street; 53.65012°N 1.78552°W		Mid 19th century	The building is in stone, with a moulded eaves cornice on brackets, and a hipped slate roof. There are four storeys and 13 bays, the right two bays and the entrance bay protruding. The windows are sashes with moulded voussoirs and imposts, they have segmental heads in the first floor and round heads in the top floor. In the three upper floors is cast ironwork, with window boxes in the first and top floor, and a rail along the second floor. The doorway is flanked by granite columns with foliage capitals, and at the top is a tower with a square dome and a tall finial. At the right end is a carriage entry, and the area is enclosed by cast iron railings.	II
8 Henry Street; 53.64666°N 1.78658°W	—	Mid 19th century (probable)	A stone building with a string course, a parapet, and a slate roof. There are two storeys and five bays. In the ground floor are four windows and a doorway, all with round-arched heads, relieving arches, keystones, and a continuous impost band. The upper floor contains five modern windows flanked and separated by pilasters.	II
1–9 John William Street; 53.64708°N 1.78276°W	—	Mid 19th century	A block of shops on a corner site in sandstone, with rusticated quoins, a modillion eaves cornice, and a parapet. There are three storeys, fronts of six bays, and a rounded bay on the corner. In the ground floor are modern shop fronts, and the upper floors contain sash windows, those in the middle floor with moulded surrounds, full entablatures, and aprons, and those in the corner bay are tripartite.	II
11–15 John William Street; 53.64718°N 1.78269°W	—	Mid 19th century	A block of shops in sandstone, with a moulded sill band, a modillion eaves cornice, and a blocking course. There are three storeys and five bays. In the ground floor are modern shop fronts, and the upper floors contain sash windows, those in the middle floor with moulded surrounds, keystones and entablatures, and in the top floor with raised surrounds, cornices, and sills on brackets.	II
17–37 John William Street; 53.64760°N 1.78284°W	—	Mid 19th century	A block of shops on a corner site in sandstone, with rusticated quoins, a moulded cornice above the ground floor, moulded sill bands, a modillion eaves cornice, and a parapet with piers. There are three storeys, 19 bays on John William Street and six on St Peter's Street. In the ground floor are modern shop fronts, and the upper floors contain sash windows, those in the middle floor with moulded surrounds, some with panelled aprons, entablatures, and segmental pediments, and one with a balustrade. The windows in the top floor have segmental-arched heads with keystones, and sills on moulded consoles. In the ground floor is a doorway with Tuscan columns and a full entablature.	II
22–34 John William Street; 53.64774°N 1.78249°W	—	Mid 19th century	A block of shops on a corner site in sandstone, with rusticated quoins, sill bands, a modillion eaves cornice, and a parapet with pedimented piers. There are three storeys and attics, 13 bays on John William Street, eight on St Peter's Street, nine on Church Street, and bay on the corners. In the ground floor on John William Street are modern shop fronts, in St Peter's Street and Church Street are round-arched sash windows, and in St Peter's Street is a doorway, all with moulded voussoirs. keystones, and a band, and the doorway has Tuscan pilasters and a full entablature. The upper floors contain sash windows, those in the middle floor with entablatures. In St Peter's Street the areas have ornate cast iron railings.	II
64 and 66 John William Street; 53.64879°N 1.78287°W	—	Mid 19th century	A shop and an office in stone, with a modillion eaves cornice, a blocking course, a slate roof, and three storeys. No. 64 has two bays, in the ground floor is a shop window, a round-arched doorway and a smaller doorway, and sash windows above, round-arched in the middle floor where the right window has a triangular pediment. No. 66 has a symmetrical front of three bays, a central doorway with Ionic half-columns and a full entablature, with moulded imposts, voussoirs, and a keystone. This is flanked by canted bay windows with cornices and parapets. In the upper floors are sash windows; in the middle floor the central window has a pediment, and the outer ones are tripartite.	II
68 John William Street; 53.64889°N 1.78292°W	—	Mid 19th century	A sandstone shop with a moulded sill band, a modillion eaves cornice, and a blocking course. There are three storeys and two bays. In the ground floor is a shop front flanked by Ionic pilasters, and the upper floors contain sash windows in moulded surrounds, those in the middle floor with cornices.	II
70–78 John William Street; 53.64911°N 1.78299°W		Mid 19th century	A block of shops on a corner site in sandstone, with rusticated quoins, moulded sill bands, and a modillion eaves cornice. There are three storeys, six bays on John William Street, and ten on Brook Street. In the ground floor are modern shop fronts, with a moulded cornice above. Three bays in John William Street and all the bays in Brook Street have ground floor openings with segmental heads, a moulded impost band and voussoirs. In the upper floors are sash windows, in the middle floor with moulded surrounds, and in John William Street also with cornices or pediments.	II
2 Market Walk; 53.64628°N 1.78188°W	—	Mid 19th century	A stone shop with stone gutter brackets and a stone slate roof. There are two storeys and three bays, and in the upper floor are sash windows. The ground floor contains a 19th-century shop front that has rusticated pilasters with Tuscan capitals, an entablature, and a dentilled cornice. By the sides of the doorway are curved glass panels, and on the front are painted glass panels.	II
1 and 3 Northumberland Street; 53.64871°N 1.78281°W	—	Mid 19th century	Offices and shops on a corner site, the building is in stone, the ground floor is rusticated, and it has moulded sill bands, a modillion eaves cornice and blocking course, and a hipped slate roof. There are three storeys and a basement, seven bays on Northumberland Street, one bay on John William Street, and a canted bay on the corner. The windows are sashes with moulded surrounds, in the ground floor they have round-arched heads, and in the middle floor they have cornices, those in the outer bays with pediments. In the ground floor are shop windows with round-headed lights, and the basement area is enclosed by ornate cast iron railings.	II
14 and 16 Northumberland Street; 53.64889°N 1.78016°W	—	Mid 19th century	An office block in stone, with rusticated quoins, sill bands, a moulded impost band, a bracketed eaves cornice, and a hipped slate roof. There are three storeys and a basement, and a front of eight bays. The doorway has a semicircular fanlight, and the windows are sashes. The ground floor windows have round-arched heads, vermiculated voussoirs and keystones, those in the upper floors have moulded surrounds, and in the middle floor they have segmental-arched heads.	II
6 New North Parade; 53.64788°N 1.78660°W	—	Mid 19th century	A stone house at the end of a terrace, with a band, a moulded eaves cornice on brackets, and a hipped slate roof. There are two storeys and two bays. The doorway in the right bay has been converted into a window, and has Tuscan pilasters, a chamfered segmental arch, and a moulded cornice. The windows are sashes with chamfered surrounds, segmental heads and hood moulds.	II
8 New North Parade; 53.64794°N 1.78669°W		Mid 19th century	A stone house in a terrace, with a moulded eaves cornice, a parapet with panelled piers, and a slate roof. There are two storeys and three bays. In the middle bay is a doorway with three-quarter Tuscan columns, a moulded cornice, and a blocking course. To the left is a carriage entrance converted into a window, with a depressed arch, moulded imposts, and voussoirs. The windows are sashes, the window in the ground floor with a moulded surround and a cornice.	II
10 and 12 New North Parade; 53.64802°N 1.78676°W	—	Mid 19th century	A pair of stone houses in a terrace with a band, a moulded eaves cornice and blocking course, and a tile roof. There are two storeys and five bays. The doorways have plain surrounds and moulded cornices, and the windows are sashes.	II
18 New North Parade; 53.64824°N 1.78703°W	—	Mid 19th century	A stone house at the end of a terrace, later used for other purposes, it has a moulded eaves cornice and blocking course, and a slate roof. There are two storeys and three bays. The doorway in the middle bay has a fanlight and a moulded cornice, in the left bay is an oblong bay window with a moulded cornice and blocking course, and the windows are sashes.	II
23 New North Parade; 53.64774°N 1.78705°W	—	Mid 19th century	A stone house with a band, a moulded eaves cornice and blocking course, and a slate roof. There are two storeys and three bays. The central doorway has a fanlight and a moulded cornice, and the windows are sashes.	II
25 New North Parade; 53.64781°N 1.78716°W	—	Mid 19th century	A stone house, later used for other purposes, it has a band, a moulded eaves cornice and blocking course, and a slate roof. There are two storeys and three bays. The central doorway has an oblong fanlight, Tuscan pilasters, and a moulded cornice. To the left is a 19th-century shop front, and to the right is a carriage entry with a depressed arch, moulded imposts and voussoirs. In the upper floor are sash windows.	II
2 and 4 Queen Street; 53.64550°N 1.78041°W	—	Mid 19th century	A pair of stone shops with rusticated quoins, a modillion eaves cornice, and a stone slate roof. There are three storeys and five bays. In the ground floor are modern shop fronts, and the upper floors contain sash windows with moulded surrounds. In the top floor they have segmental heads and keystones, and the central window in the middle floor has a segmental pediment.	II
2–6 Railway Street; 53.64727°N 1.78448°W	—	Mid 19th century	A block of offices and shops in stone with a moulded modillion eaves cornice, and a hipped slate roof. There are four storeys and a basement, a front of eleven bays, and a curved bay on the right corner. The middle bay contains a carriage entrance with two tripartite windows above and a single-light window in the top floor. The bays to each side differ slightly in details. Features include rusticated ground floors, quoins, pulvinated friezes, cornices, sill bands, bands, and balustrades. The windows are sashes with round-arched heads in the ground floor, and are flat-headed above. Window features include triangular pediments and decorative keystones. The doorways have segmental-headed fanlights, rusticated jambs, decorated keystones, and moulded cornices, and the basement area is enclosed by cast iron railings.	II*
8 and 10 Railway Street; 53.64745°N 1.78453°W		Mid 19th century	An office block in stone on a moulded plinth, with rusticated and vermiculated quoins, a moulded impost band, moulded sill bands, a moulded modillion eaves cornice, and a hipped slate roof. There are four storeys and a basement, and the ground floor is rusticated. The windows are sashes. In the ground floor they are round-arched with vermiculated keystones, in the first floor they have moulded surrounds, gadrooned keystones, pulvinated friezes, triangular pediments, and balustrades. In the second floor they have moulded surrounds and cornices, and those in the top floor have pilasters and cornices on brackets. The basement areas are enclosed by cast iron railings.	II*
13–21 Railway Street; 53.64785°N 1.78403°W	—	Mid 19th century	An office block in stone with quoins, moulded sill bands, a moulded dentilled and modillioned eaves cornice and a hipped slate roof. There are three storeys, a basement and attics, and an angled front of ten bays. The ground floor is rusticated, between the bays are Ionic three-quarter columns, and above it is a full entablature. The windows are sashes, in the ground floor they are round-headed and mostly paired, and have relief carving in the spandrels. In the middle floor they have sunk and moulded aprons flanked by consoles, moulded surrounds, pulvinated friezes and cornices, and in the top floor they have moulded surrounds. The doorways have semicircular fanlights.	II
7 St George's Square; 53.64797°N 1.78395°W		Mid 19th century	An office block in stone with quoins, moulded sill bands, a moulded dentilled and modillioned eaves cornice and a hipped slate roof. There are three storeys and a basement, and a front of five bays. The ground floor is rusticated, between the bays are Ionic three-quarter columns, and above it is a full entablature. The windows are sashes, in the ground floor with sunk and moulded aprons, and in the middle floor also with moulded surrounds, pulvinated friezes and cornices, and in the top floor they have moulded surrounds. Steps with railings lead up to the doorway that has an oblong fanlight. The basement areas are enclosed by cast iron railings.	II*
12–20 St George's Square; 53.64753°N 1.78471°W	—	Mid 19th century	An office block in stone on a moulded plinth, with rusticated and vermiculated quoins, a moulded impost band, moulded sill bands, a moulded modillion eaves cornice, and a hipped slate roof. There are four storeys and a basement, and the ground floor is rusticated. The windows are sashes. In the ground floor they are round-arched with vermiculated keystones, in the first floor they have moulded surrounds, gadrooned keystones, pulvinated friezes, triangular pediments, and balustrades. In the second floor they have moulded surrounds and cornices, and those in the top floor have pilasters and cornices on brackets. The basement areas are enclosed by cast iron railings.	II*
1 and 3 St George's Street; 53.64741°N 1.78509°W	—	Mid 19th century	The building is in stone, with sill bands, and a hipped slate roof. There are four storeys and a basement, and twelve bays. The windows are sashes, those in the ground floor with round-arched heads, impost bands, and keystones, and the windows in the left bay are blind.	II
9 to 13 Station Street, archway and gates 53.64752°N 1.78368°W	—	Mid 19th century	An office block in stone, with a string course, an embattled parapet and crocketed pinnacles at the corners. There are three storeys and a basement, and nine bays. The windows are sashes, those in the ground floor with segmental heads. There are three doorways with fanlights, one with a segmental head, and the others with pointed arches. To the left is an archway with a pointed arch, a hood mould, and a crow-stepped gable, containing cast iron gates with Gothic ornament.	II
15 Station Street and gate 53.64774°N 1.78367°W	—	Mid 19th century	An office block in stone with sill bands, a moulded eaves cornice and a slate roof. There are four storeys and six bays. In the ground floor, to the right, is a doorway with a moulded surround and a fanlight, and to the left is a round-arched carriage entrance with moulded imposts and a vermiculated keystone. The upper floors have a full entablature with Ionic pilasters. The windows in the ground floor are sashes, and in the upper floors they are casements. To the left of the building are cast iron gates with fleur-de-lys finials.	II
28–32 Westgate; 53.64714°N 1.78454°W		Mid 19th century	An office block on a corner site, in stone, with quoins, a moulded and modillioned cornice, and a hipped slate roof. There are four storeys, five bays on Westgate, and a curved bay on the corner. In the ground floor is a shop front with rusticated piers, round-arched windows with moulded voussoirs, keystones, and fluted columns, and the doorway has a semicircular fanlight. The windows are sashes with moulded surrounds; in the first floor they have pulvinated friezes and corbels, and in the second floor they have triangular pediments on consoles. The curved bay contain tripartite windows, in the first floor with square Tuscan columns, a gadrooned keystone, and an entablature, and in the second floor a broken segmental pediment.	II
34–42 Westgate; 53.64715°N 1.78488°W	—	Mid 19th century	A stone shop with a moulded and modillioned cornice, and a slate roof. There are three storeys and eight bays. In the ground floor are shop fronts from the 19th-century and the 1930s with features including rusticated piers with Tuscan capitals, curved plate glass windows, and a chrome frieze. Above the ground floor is a moulded cornice, and the upper floors contain sash windows. The windows in the middle floor have Gibbs surrounds and a dentilled cornice, and in the top floor they have fluted consoles, moulded surrounds and segmental heads.	II
32 and 34 Wood Street; 53.64836°N 1.78220°W	—	Mid 19th century	A stone building on a plinth, with moulded sill bands, a moulded eaves cornice, a blocking course, and a hipped slate roof. There are three storeys and four bays. In the ground floor are two doorways and two windows, all round-arched with rusticated voussoirs, tall keystones, and moulded imposts. In the upper floors are windows with rusticated voussoirs, in the middle floor with round heads, and in the top floor with segmental heads.	II
Former Crescent Hotel; 53.64857°N 1.78212°W	—	Mid 19th century	The hotel, later used for other purposes, is in stone, with sill bands, a modillion eaves cornice, a blocking course, and a hipped slate roof. There are three storeys and a basement, a front of five bays, and canted corners. Steps with handrails lead up to the central doorway. The windows are sashes, paired in the outer two bays and single-light in the middle bay. In the upper two floors they have round-arched heads, those in the middle floor with triangular pediments, and in the top floor with moulded cornices.	II
Freemasons' Hall; 53.65022°N 1.78502°W	—	Mid 19th century	The hall is in stone with rusticated quoins, a sill band, a string course, a modillion eaves cornice, a blocking course, and a hipped slate roof. There are two storeys and a basement, and three bays. Steps with handrails lead up to the central doorway that has a moulded surround, a fanlight, and a dentilled cornice on scrolled brackets. The windows are sashes with moulded cornices; in the ground floor they have moulded surrounds, and in the upper floor they have segmental heads, plain surrounds, and keystones. The basement area is enclosed by cast iron railings with spear finials.	II
Plantation House; 53.64562°N 1.78569°W	—	Mid 19th century	A shop in stone, the ground floor rusticated, with quoins, a moulded eaves cornice, and a hipped slate roof. There are three storeys and a basement, and four bays. The windows are sashes and the doorway has a semicircular fanlight. The ground floor windows and the doorway have voussoirs that are alternately vermiculated, vermiculated keystones, and a continuous moulded impost band.	II
Former Princess Cinema; 53.64885°N 1.78233°W	—	Mid 19th century	The building is in stone with rusticated quoins, moulded sill bands, a dentilled eaves cornice, and a parapet. There are three storeys, a front of three bays, canted bays on the corners, and two bays on each side. In the centre and in the corners are round-arched doorways with moulded imposts, fanlights, and above the central doorway is a Doric frieze. Flanking the central doorway are glazed Tuscan colonnades. The middle window in the first floor has a triangular pediment and the outer windows are tripartite with moulded cornices, and in the top floor they have moulded surrounds and dentilled cornices.	II
Revenue Chambers; 53.64819°N 1.78204°W	—	Mid 19th century	An office block in stone, with rusticated quoins, continuous sill bands and imposts, a moulded eaves cornice, a blocking course, and a hipped slate roof. There are three storeys and basements, and a front of five bays. In the ground floor are arches with rusticated voussoirs, jambs and keystones over four Venetian windows and a doorway. In the upper floors are paired windows with moulded surrounds, voussoirs and keystones, with round arches in the middle floor and segmental arches in the top floor.	II
Westgate House; 53.64686°N 1.78306°W		Mid 19th century	A shop on a corner site that is basically in stone, but was refronted on the front and side in 1923 in bronze on a steel frame. There are four storeys, and two bays on each side. In the ground floor are modern shop fronts, and above, in each bay, is a shallow three-storey oriel window. Between the windows are moulded panels and cartouches, and at the top is an inscribed frieze, an eaves entablature, and a modillioned cornice.	II
Lion Buildings; 53.64829°N 1.78260°W		1851–53	A block of offices and warehouses with shops in the ground floor designed by J. P. Pritchett and surmounted by the statue of a lion in Coade stone. It is in sandstone with a hipped slate roof, and three storeys. The ends are rounded, and the central bay is flanked on each floor by paired columns, with a balcony on the middle floor, and an open pediment at the top under the statue, which is flanked by a balustrade. In the ground floor are modern shop fronts, and the middle floor contains arcades of four round-arched windows with Composite columns. In the top floor are similar windows as single lights or in pairs.	II*
Britannia Buildings; 53.64803°N 1.78327°W		1856–58	A block of offices and shops in sandstone, with rusticated quoins, some of them vermiculated, and a hipped slate roof. There are three storeys, a front of 13 bays and seven bays on the sides. In the ground floor are six plate glass windows with bronze mullions flanking the central entrance, surrounded by decorative piers and a frieze. The other windows are sashes; in the middle floor they have moulded surrounds, Tuscan half-pilasters, full entablatures, and triangular modillioned pediments. The central window is tripartite, with a segmental hood. The windows in the top floor have segmental heads and keystones, between them are panels, and flanking the middle window are sculpted flowers. Above is a moulded eaves cornice with scrolled brackets and festoons, and along the top is a balustrade and panelled piers with gadrooned urns. In the centre is a segmental pediment containing the Royal Arms, and above that a statue of Britannia.	II*
Gateway arch and lamp post, St Peter's Church; 53.64711°N 1.78087°W	—	1859	The arch at the entrance to the churchyard was designed by William Butterfield, it is in stone, and has stepped sides and a pitched gable. The archway has traceried panels with a blind quatrefoil, and a moulded top with a cross finial. In the churchyard is a cast iron lamp post with an ornamental column and a hexagonal lamp.	II
Friendly and Trades Club; 53.64912°N 1.78046°W		1859–60	Originally the Mechanics' Institution, later extended and used for other purposes, it is in stone, with a sill band, and a hipped slate roof. There is one storey and a basement, and three bays. Each bay contains a tripartite opening with Tuscan pilasters, above each of which is a round arch with moulded voussoirs and imposts, and a blind tympanum containing wreathed roundels. The central opening is a doorway approached by steps flanked by cast iron torchères, and the outer openings contain sash windows. Along the top is an inscribed frieze, above which are console-shaped modillions. The basement area is enclosed by cast iron railings with spear finials. At the rear are two later wings.	II
1 and 3 Brook Street; 53.64954°N 1.78288°W		1863	The former marble works is in stone, with a moulded eaves cornice, a slate roof with coped gables, and two storeys and attics. In the ground floor is a modern shop front, and to the right is a doorway with a cornice, and a carriage entrance with a chamfered surround and a pointed arch. Above the arch is an inscribed frieze, and a two-light window with pointed heads and a blind oculus in the spandrel with the date in pieces of coloured marble. Above the shop front are five windows with pointed heads, chamfered voussoirs, a continuous hood mould, an impost band with marble ornament, and blind oculi in the spandrels. In the roof are three gabled dormers.	II
27 Market Place; 53.64637°N 1.78215°W		1863–64	A bank in stone, with a moulded sill band, a modillioned and dentilled eaves cornice, and a parapet with panelled piers. There are three storeys and five bays. In the ground floor are fluted Composite pilasters and a full entablature with foliage carving in the frieze. The windows are round-arched, and have keystones with masks, polished marble columns, and foliage in panels and the spandrels. The windows are sashes; in the middle floor they have segmental heads, panelled pilasters, carved spandrels, and alternating triangular and segmental pediments. The windows in the top floor have rounded top corners, moulded consoles and festoons. The porch is flanked by foliage panels, and has a moulded cornice and ornate cresting.	II
Estate Buildings; 53.64718°N 1.78402°W		1868–70	The building was designed by W. H. Crossland as the Ramsden Estate Buildings, and later used for a variety of purposes. It is in stone, with parapets, party plain and partly traceried, and hipped slate roofs, in parts conical, and with gables that have finials. There are four storeys, five bays on Westgate, three on Railway Street, and on the corner is a full-height polygonal turret. The ground floor contains segmental arches with carved spandrels, and above are sash windows, between which are polished marble colonnettes with foliate capitals, segmental-headed in the first floor, flat-headed in the second floor, and round-headed in the top floor. Other features include four tourelles with pinnacles and gables on elaborately carved corbels.	II*
Huddersfield Town Hall, wall and railings 53.64395°N 1.78272°W		1875–76	The town hall was built in two stages, the second stage in 1878–81. It is in stone and both parts have two storeys, the later part taller. The entrance front of the earlier part has a parapet with urns, and it contains the borough arms. Steps lead up to the porch, which has paired columns, a full entablature and a parapet. The area in front has a low wall with urns and cast iron railings with ornamental finials. The later part contains a concert hall that has a round-arched entrance with marble columns, a keystone with a sculpted face, and carving in the spandrels.	II
1–11 New Street; 53.64623°N 1.78243°W	—	Late 19th century	A row of shops in stone with a modillion eaves cornice, and a balustrade consisting of vase-shaped balusters and piers with pediments. There are three storeys, 15 bays on the front, and three on the north return. Surmounting the third bay from the right is a panel with a swag in relief and a full entablature with a pulvinated frieze, a pediment and two ball finials. In the ground floor are modern shop fronts, and above are giant pilasters, and sash windows with moulded surrounds. The windows in the middle floor have pulvinated friezes and pediments, and in the top floor they have fluted keystones.	II
Byram Arcade; 53.64712°N 1.78337°W		1878–81	The shopping arcade was designed by W. H. Crossland, and is in stone with a slate roof. There are five storeys and six bays, with five gables, the gable over the middle two bays crow-stepped. In the ground floor are shop fronts, and the arched entrance to the shopping arcade. This has carved voussoirs and spandrels, and a wrought iron fanlight, over which is a cartouche with a coat of arms supported by gryphons. Above the first floor windows are rows of glazed tiles, and in the upper floors are sash windows, segmental-headed in the fourth floor. On the Station Street front are four storeys, and at the rear corner is a turret with a conical roof on a moulded corbel.	II
Tower, Goods Yard; 53.64980°N 1.78559°W		c. 1878 {(probable	The former hydraulic accumulator tower, which is in Italianate style, is in red brick, with blue brick quoins, imposts and string courses, pink brick voussoirs, a yellow brick cornice, and a pyramidal slate roof. The tower contains an oculus, above which is a blind arcade of three arches on each side with keystones and the centre lights glazed, and overhanging bracketed eaves.	II
Stone warehouse, Goods Yard; 53.64776°N 1.78586°W		1878–82	The warehouse is in stone with a parapet and a slate roof. There are two storeys and an attic, fronts of twelve bays and sides of five bays. The double doors have a fanlight, and in the gable ends are semicircular lunettes.	II
Waverley Chambers; 53.64705°N 1.78203°W	—	1882	The building on a corner site, originally a hotel and later used as offices and shops, was designed by W. H. Crossland with sculptures by C. E. Fucigna. It is in sandstone with a slate roof. There are three storeys and attics, and fronts of three bays. In the ground floor are modern shop fronts, and pilasters with blocks of vermiculated rustication. In the left bay is a round-arched entrance with a similar surround and a keystone with a cartouche containing a coat of arms. Above the ground floor are pedestals with urns, and the upper floors contain windows, round-arched in the middle bay with carved keystones, and flat-headed in the outer bays. Over these is an eaves cornice and elaborate dormers. Behind the left dormer is a pyramidal roof with lucarnes, a lead-covered spirelet, and a decorative weathervane.	II
Kirkgate Buildings; 53.64716°N 1.78170°W		c. 1883	A block of offices and shops designed by W. H. Crossland with sculptures by C. E. Fucigna. It is in sandstone with a slate roof. There are three storeys and attics, three bays on the front and nine on the sides. In the ground floor are modern shop fronts, the upper floors contain flat-headed windows, and in the attic are elaborate decorative dormers. The main entrance has a round arch with a keystone carved as a Greek god. It contains a massive fanlight on a dentilled cornice carrying two lion sculptures. Above are three glazed decorative roundels and an arcade of three round-arched windows between which are columns and piers with Corinthian capitals and a balustrade.	II
Somerset Buildings; 53.64772°N 1.78186°W	—	1883	A block of offices and shops designed by W. H. Crossland with sculptures by C. E. Fucigna. It is in sandstone with a slate roof. There are three storeys and attics, and front so three and four bays. In the ground floor are modern shop fronts, the upper floors contain flat-headed windows, and in the attic are elaborate decorative dormers. The main entrance has a round arch with a keystone carved as a Greek god. It contains a massive fanlight on a dentilled cornice carrying two lion sculptures. Above are three glazed decorative roundels and an arcade of three round-arched windows between which are columns and piers with Corinthian capitals and a balustrade.	II
Large warehouse, Goods Yard; 53.64848°N 1.78608°W		1885	The warehouse is in red brick, with dressings and string courses in blue brick, and the eaves cornice and brackets in yellow brick. There are five storeys facing the railway and three facing the yard. The east front has 22 bays of industrial windows and four of loading doors. Projecting over the railway is a loading bay carried on cast iron Doric columns. The west front has 18 bays of windows and four of loading doors, and the canted side has seven bays of windows.	II
Wholesale Market; 53.64932°N 1.78182°W		1887–88	The market is in cast iron, glazed in the upper parts, and with glazed hipped roofs. There are six aisles, and the building is carried on cast iron columns with foliate capitals. At the top is a frieze with roundels, and heraldic ornaments at the tops of the columns. Outside are glass canopies on ornamental brackets.	II*
Electricity junction box 53.65019°N 1.78407°W		1896	The electricity junction box in Fitzwilliam Street is in cast iron, and painted blue. It is about 4 feet (1.2 m) high, and on the top is a low pyramidal cap with castellated edges over a moulded cornice on corbels. The north door has decorative strap hinges, and three panels, the middle panel containing an inscribed roundel.	II
Station Street Buildings; 53.64762°N 1.78331°W		1899	An office block on a corner site, in stone, with a modillion cornice and an openwork parapet. There are two storeys and a basement and ten bays on Station Street, and three storeys and seven bays on St Peter's Street. The lower two floors are rusticated, and in the top floor are three-quarter Ionic columns carrying a full entablature. One bay on St Peter's Street and two on Station Street project, and at the top are swan's neck pediments and shaped gables containing oval oculi. On the corner is an octagonal turret with a pyramidal roof, an open lantern and a finial. The windows are casements; in the ground floor they are round-arched, and above they are mullioned and transomed. The doorways have concave jambs and fanlights, in St Peter's Street with a triangular pediment on consoles, and on Station Street with a broken pediment.	II
71 New Street; 53.64455°N 1.78313°W		1899–1901	Originally an office designed by Alfred Waterhouse, it is on a corner site, and built in red brick and terracotta, on a pink marble plinth, with a moulded string course, a moulded eaves cornice, and a slate roof. There are three storeys and an attic, three bays on each front and a bay on the corner, with a gable and a finial on each front and on the corner. The ground floor contains a modern shop front, and on the west front is a doorway with paired marble columns, a fanlight, a pointed arch and a gable. The windows are mullioned and transomed casements in moulded surrounds. In the west front is a statue in a canopied niche, and in the south front is a lettered frieze.	II
1 and 3 Market Street; 53.64689°N 1.78407°W		1913	A bank on a corner site, later offices, it is in stone, the ground floor is rusticated, and it has a dentilled cornice above the second floor, a moulded eaves cornice, and a parapet with scrolled consoles. There are four storeys, eight bays on Market Street, three on Westgate, and a curved bay on the corner. The doorway on the corner has a round-arched head, Ionic columns, a full entablature, a pulvinated frieze, a dentilled cornice, and an inscribed cartouche. The windows are sashes with moulded surrounds, in the first floor they have cornices and keystones, and in the ground floor they are separated by three-quarter Tuscan columns.	II
Kirkgate Tenements; 53.64676°N 1.77861°W	—	1914	Three blocks of tenements in a row in sandstone, rendered at the rear, with slate roofs. Each block has three storeys, a stairwell at the west end, and a balcony on the south side. The two southern blocks have a T-shaped plan, and the north block is canted to fit the site. They have sill bands, and triangular gables and semicircular pediments each containing a diamond-shaped motif. The doorways have plain surrounds, and the windows are sashes.	II
Former Empire Cinema; 53.64956°N 1.78317°W		Early 20th century	The cinema on a corner site, later used for other purposes, is in stone, with a modillioned and dentilled cornice and a parapet. There are two storeys, a canted bay on the corner with horizontal rustication, and six bays on each side. The central part of the corner bay is slightly recessed, and contains a doorway with paired fluted Ionic columns. Above, the parapet is raised, and contains a blind semicircular lunette with rusticated voussoirs.	II
40 New Street; 53.64528°N 1.78318°W		c. 1927	The bank is in stone with a dentilled eaves cornice and a parapet. There is one storey which is the height of the adjacent buildings, and three bays. The central bay contains a tall round-arched window with moulded voussoirs, a keystone, and moulded imposts. In the left bay is a window and in the right bay is a doorway, both with moulded surrounds and cornices on moulded consoles. The doorway has a fanlight and an inscribed transom.	II
The Sportsman and the Marhaba takeaway 53.65039°N 1.78422°W		1930	The public house on a corner site is in stone with quoins, a parapet, a hipped slate roof, and ridge tiles. There are two storeys and cellars, and an L-shaped plan, with six bays on Fitzwilliam Street, seven on St John's Road, and canted bays on the corner and at the north end. The doorways in the canted bays have moulded surrounds, and lintels on consoles, and the doorway in the south front has a fanlight. The windows are sashes with moulded surrounds and lintels.	II
Four telephone kiosks 53.64873°N 1.78158°W		1935	The telephone kiosks are in two pairs in Northumberland Street outside the main post office. They are of the K6 type, designed by Giles Gilbert Scott. Constructed in cast iron with a square plan and a dome, they have unperforated crowns in the top panels.	II
Huddersfield Library and Art Gallery; 53.64446°N 1.78167°W		1937–40	The library and art gallery are steel framed and clad in pink stone, and have a square plan, three storeys and a basement. The central part of the entrance front protrudes and contains a doorway with a cornice on ogee-shaped consoles. Flanking and above the doorway are metal-framed rectangular windows, above them is a cornice, and over that a decorative panel. On the sides are two tiers of similar windows with a bas-relief frieze between. At the sides of the entrance steps are two free-standing statues by James Woodford.	II
Queensgate Market; 53.64350°N 1.78167°W		1968–70	The market hall is in reinforced concrete with cladding in Elland Edge stone and sculpted ceramic panels. It has a rectangular plan, with 21 mushroom-shaped columns carrying a hyperbolic paraboloid roof.	II
