= Conacher and Co. =

British organ building firm

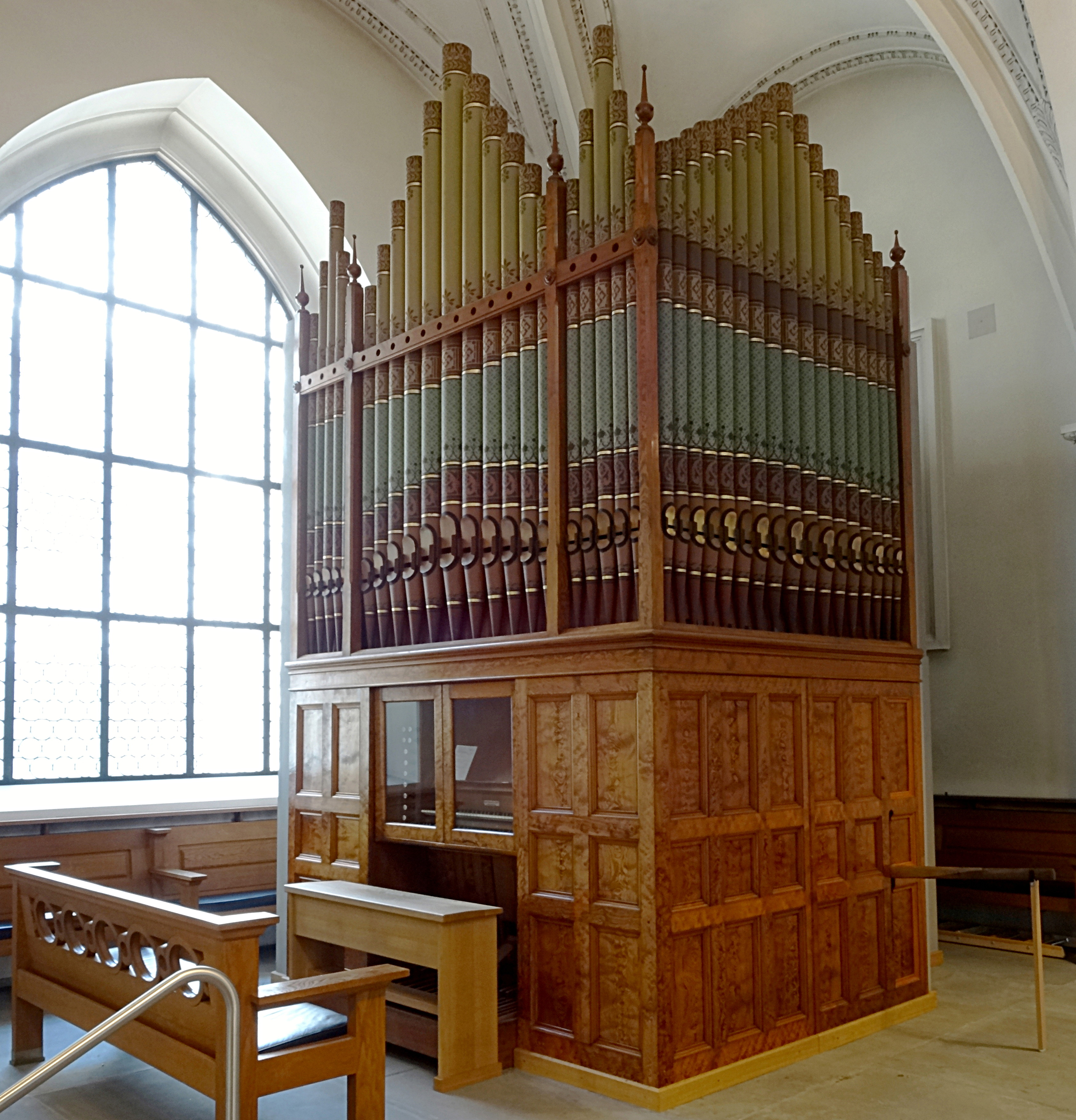
Organ by James Conacher (1886) in Predigerkirche Zürich

Conacher and Co was a firm of British organ builders based in Huddersfield, West Yorkshire, England.

== History ==
The firm originated with Peter Conacher (1823–1894), who was born in Scotland and who studied as an apprentice organ builder in Leipzig, Germany. After returning to England, he worked for Hill & Sons based in Lincolnshire, and then for Walker & Sons in London.

Conacher started his own company in 1854, initially with Richard Brown, then from 1859 with Joseph Hebblethwaite. They built a factory in George Street, Huddersfield. On the death of Hebblethwaite, Peter was joined by his brother James (1820–1886). They built an organ for the Yorkshire Exhibition of 1866; the instrument was awarded a grand medal and was installed in St Peter's Church, Huddersfield.

In 1873 the company moved to the Springwood Organ Works, Water Street, Huddersfield. Peter's son, Joseph Hebblethwaite Conacher (1856–1913), joined the family firm in 1879 and succeeded his father in the business in 1898.

In 1986 the firm was acquired by Henry Willis 4, great-grandson of the notable English organ builder "Father" Henry Willis, who put his son, John Sinclair Willis, in charge of the Conacher Works at Huddersfield.
