= St Peter's Church, Huddersfield =

St Peter's Church
- Huddersfield Parish Church
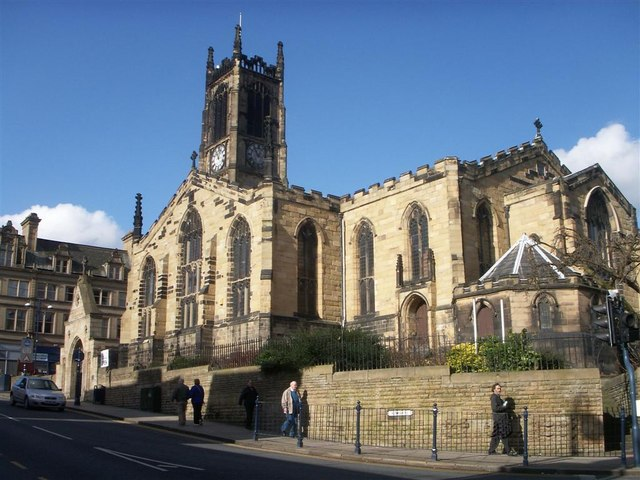
- St Peter's Church
- 53.6472°N 1.7809°W
- OS grid reference: SE 14578 16771
- Location: Huddersfield, Kirklees
- Country: England
- Denomination: Anglican
- Churchmanship: Anglo-Catholic
- Website: Church website

History
- Status: Parish church

Architecture
- Functional status: Active
- Heritage designation: Grade II*
- Designated: 3 March 1952
- Architect: James Pigott Pritchett
- Style: Gothic revival
- Completed: 27 October 1836
- Construction cost: £10,000

Administration
- Province: Province of York
- Diocese: Diocese of Leeds
- Archdeaconry: Archdeaconry of Halifax
- Deanery: Huddersfield

Clergy
- Vicar: The Revd Canon Rachel Firth

St Peter's Church, also known as Huddersfield Parish Church, is a Church of England parish church in Huddersfield, West Yorkshire, England. There has been a church on the site since the 11th century, but the current building dates from 1836. It is on the Kirkgate near Southgate in the centre of the town and is a Grade II* listed building.

== History ==
In legend, the first church on the site was built in the 11th century by Walter de Lacy, the second son of Ilbert de Lacy. Walter decided to build the church after he survived being thrown from his horse and landing in a swamp.

The church was rebuilt in the 16th century. From 1759 to 1771, Henry Venn was vicar of the church.

By the early 19th century, the town of Huddersfield was growing rapidly as a result of the industrial revolution and the parish church was too small to cope. In order to address this, Holy Trinity Church was opened in 1819 as a chapel of ease within the parish of St Peter's, before becoming a parish church in its own right in 1857.

By the 1830s the 16th-century parish church needed urgent repairs, and it was decided to rebuild it again. The architect was James Pigott Pritchett and construction was carried out from 1834 to 1836. To keep costs down during construction, the bricks used were from the previous church on the site, which meant that repairs were needed overcome the deficient materials.

Two octagonal vestries were added at the east end: one on the north side in or before 1851, and a choir vestry on the south side in 1879. Windows designed by Thomas Willement were installed in 1852. In 1866, it was realised that the stonework of the church needed repairing. In 1873, new pews and a pulpit were installed. In 1879, a choir vestry was added. Arthur Eaglefield Hull was the organist from 1904 to 1920. In 1908 an organ was installed by local builder Conacher and Co; it was restored in 1984 by Philip Wood of Huddersfield.

From 1921 to 1923, the sanctuary was reordered. A baldachin and the east window, designed by Ninian Comper as part of a war memorial, were installed. In the 1940s, the south transept was redesigned with a screen by Robert Thompson being added. In the 1980s, a new altar and dais were installed. Around 2012, the roof, ceiling and tower were repaired. Other essential repairs were also made, helped by a grant from English Heritage.

On 17 June 1965 the church was the wedding place of Olympic athletes, swimmer Anita Lonsbrough and track cyclist Hugh Porter. On 17 February 2017, the church was the location of the funeral of Gorden Kaye, the Huddersfield-born television actor and star of 'Allo 'Allo!.

== Parish ==
On weekdays, the church is open from 9:00 am until 4:00 pm and on Saturdays from 10:00 am to 2:00 pm. There is a short service of daily prayer said on Monday, Tuesday, Thursday, and Friday at 12:35 pm. Midweek Holy Communion is celebrated on Wednesdays at 12:35 pm in the side chapel.

On Sundays, there is a Book of Common Prayer communion service at 8:30 am, and a Sung Eucharist at 10:00 am.

Choral Evensong is held every second Sunday at 6:30 pm during term time. Every fourth Sunday at 6.30 pm there is alternately 'Holy Ground' which takes the form of a more informal and contemplative service or 'Rainbow Eucharist', a service designed to explicitly affirm and uphold the LGBTQIA+ community, as part of the Inclusive Church network.

The 10 am Sung Eucharist, Choral Evensong, Rainbow Eucharist, and some special services are also livestreamed on the Parish Church YouTube channel

== Gallery ==
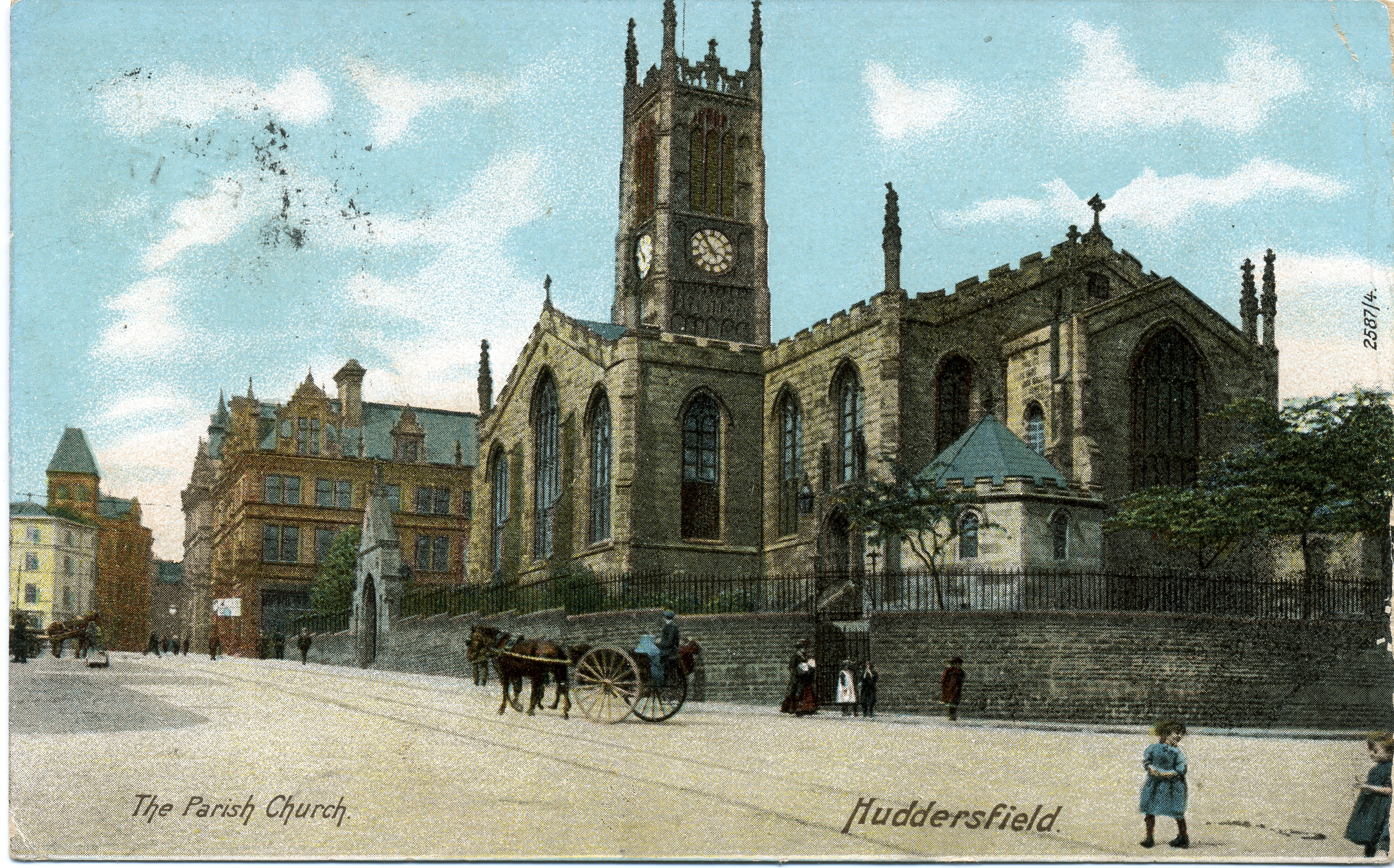
The church in 1904

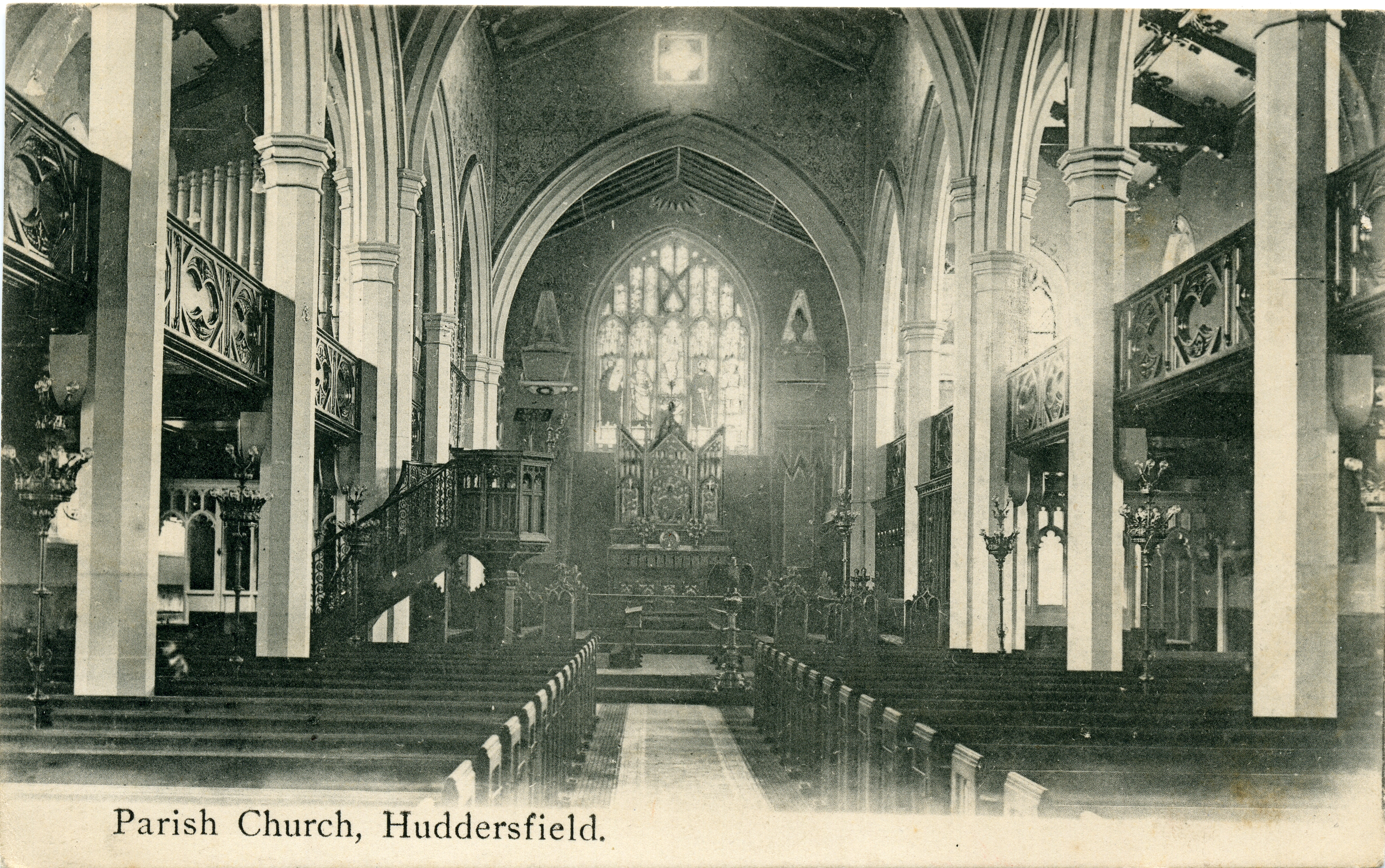
Interior in 1906

== See also ==
- Grade II* listed buildings in Kirklees
- Listed buildings in Huddersfield (Newsome Ward - central area)
- Diocese of Leeds
