= Ceccardo Egidio Fucigna =

Italian sculptor (1834–1884)

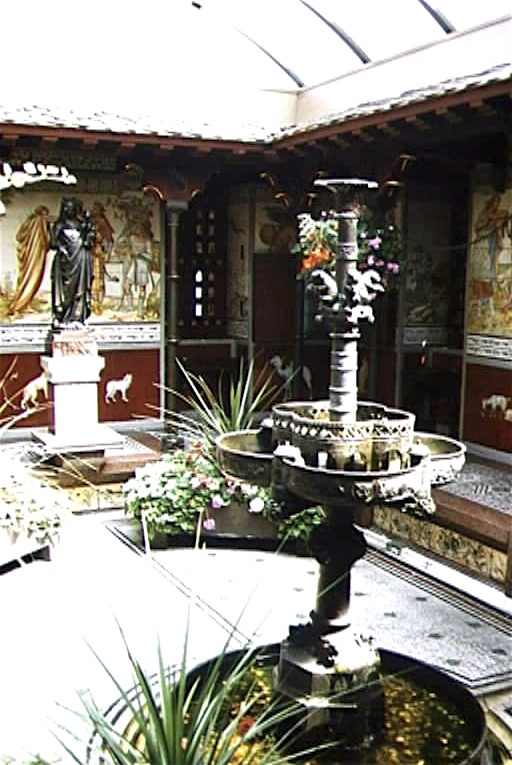
- The Madonna by Fucigna in the roof garden at Cardiff Castle
- Born: 1834; Carrara, Italy
- Died: 1884 (aged 49–50)
- Notable work: Royal Holloway College; Cardiff Castle; Castell Coch; Albert Memorial

Ceccardo Egidio Fucigna (1834–1884) was an Italian sculptor who established a long partnership with the architect William Burges.

Fucigna worked as an assistant to John Birnie Philip until the latter's death in 1875, and then oversaw the completion of some of Philip's works, including the monument to Edward Akroyd, MP, at Halifax.

He later worked with William Burges at Cardiff Castle, where he sculpted the Virgin and Child in the Roof Garden, at Castell Coch, where he was responsible for the Madonna over the drawbridge gate, and also undertook work at Royal Holloway College and at the Albert Memorial.
