= Robert Moorhouse =

English cricketer

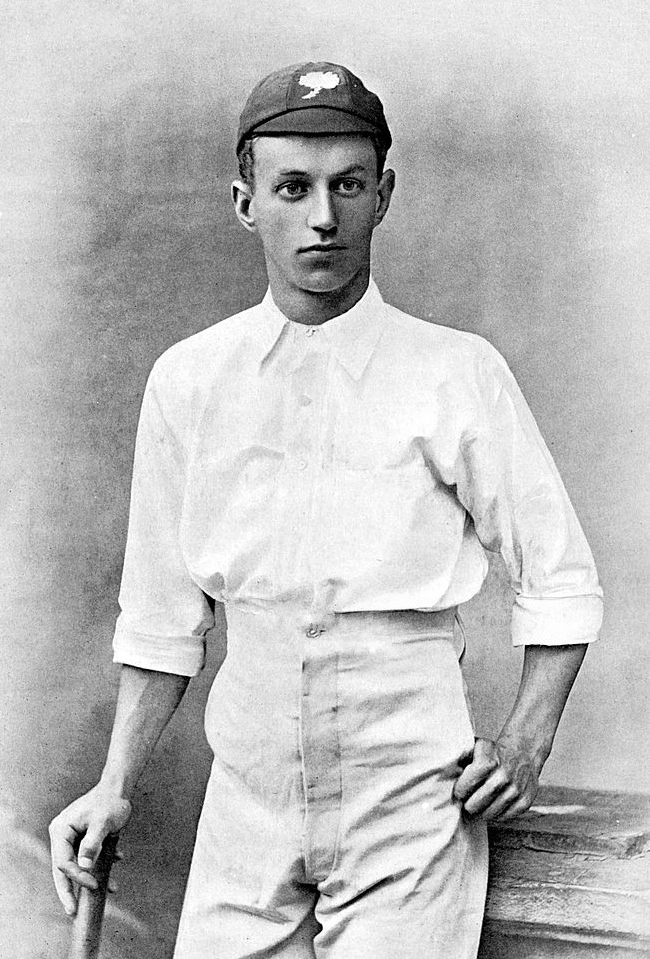

Personal information
- Born: 7 September 1866; Berry Brow, Huddersfield, Yorkshire, England
- Died: 7 January 1921 (aged 54); Taylor Hill, Huddersfield, Yorkshire, England
- Batting: Right-handed
- Bowling: Right-arm medium
- Relatives: Fred Moorhouse (brother)

Domestic team information
- Years: Team
- 1888–1899: Yorkshire
- 1891–1900: MCC

Career statistics
Competition	First-class
Matches	217
Runs scored	5,337
Batting average	18.72
100s/50s	3/25
Top score	113
Balls bowled	3,328
Wickets	49
Bowling average	29.43
5 wickets in innings	0
10 wickets in match	0
Best bowling	6/18
Catches/stumpings	93/–
- Source: CricInfo, 31 July 2012

Robert Moorhouse (7 September 1866 – 7 January 1921) was an English first-class cricketer, who played 206 matches for Yorkshire County Cricket Club between 1888 and 1899. He also played first-class cricket for the Marylebone Cricket Club (MCC) (1891–1900) and an XI of Yorkshire (1894).

He was born in Berry Brow, Huddersfield, Yorkshire, England. In 217 first-class games overall, he scored 5,337 runs at 18.72 on the difficult pitches of the time. He recorded three centuries, with his best a knock of 113 against Somerset. His other tons came at the expense of MCC (105) and Warwickshire (102*). He took 49 wickets with his right arm medium pace, at a cost of 28.08 apiece, with his best bowling return of 4 for 40 coming against Sussex whilst playing for the MCC. He was also on the MCC groundstaff at one time.

A short plucky man, Moorhouse had the reputation of being a fine cover-point fielder. A product of Armitage Bridge C.C. in the Huddersfield League, Moorhouse was often on the fringes of the Yorkshire side, and sometimes appeared in preference to a better batsman due to his fielding ability. Subsequently, he was coach at Sedbergh School.

His brother, Fred Moorhouse, played 117 games for Warwickshire.

Moorhouse died in January 1921 in Taylor Hill, Huddersfield, at the age of 54.
