= Robert Bisseker =

English cricketer (1878–1965)

Personal information
- Full name: Robert Godlonton Bisseker
- Born: 19 November 1878; Port Elizabeth, Cape Province, South Africa
- Died: 9 March 1965 (aged 86); Hindhead, Surrey, England
- Batting: Unknown
- Bowling: Unknown

Domestic team information
- Years: Team
- 1904: Cambridge University

Career statistics
Competition	First-class
Matches	1
Runs scored	9
Batting average	–
100s/50s	–/–
Top score	9*
Balls bowled	120
Wickets	2
Bowling average	22.00
5 wickets in innings	–
10 wickets in match	–
Best bowling	1/16
Catches/stumpings	3/–
- Source: Cricinfo, 14 January 2022

Robert Godlonton Bisseker (19 November 1878 – 9 March 1965) was a South African-born English first-class cricketer and clergyman.

The son of Henry Bisseker, he was born at Port Elizabeth in South Africa. He was educated in England at King Edward's School in Birmingham, before matriculating to Jesus College, Cambridge. While studying at Cambridge, he made a single appearance in first-class cricket for Cambridge University Cricket Club against Warwickshire at Edgbaston in 1904. He batted once in the match, scoring an unbeaten nine runs in the Cambridge first innings of 332. With the ball, he took the wickets of Fred Moorhouse in Warwickshire's first innings and Alfred Glover in their second innings, to finish with match figures of 2 for 44. In addition to playing cricket at Cambridge, he also played football for Cambridge University A.F.C., for which he gained a blue.

Bisseker was later ordained into the Church of England as a deacon at Peterborough Cathedral in 1912, before being appointed curate at Oakham until 1916. From there he was appointed rector at Whitwell, and later at Normanton; he held both roles simultaneously until his retirement in 1945. In retirement he lived at Felpham near Bognor Regis. Bisseker died at Hindhead in March 1965.
