= Berry Brow railway station =

Railway station in West Yorkshire, England

Berry Brow
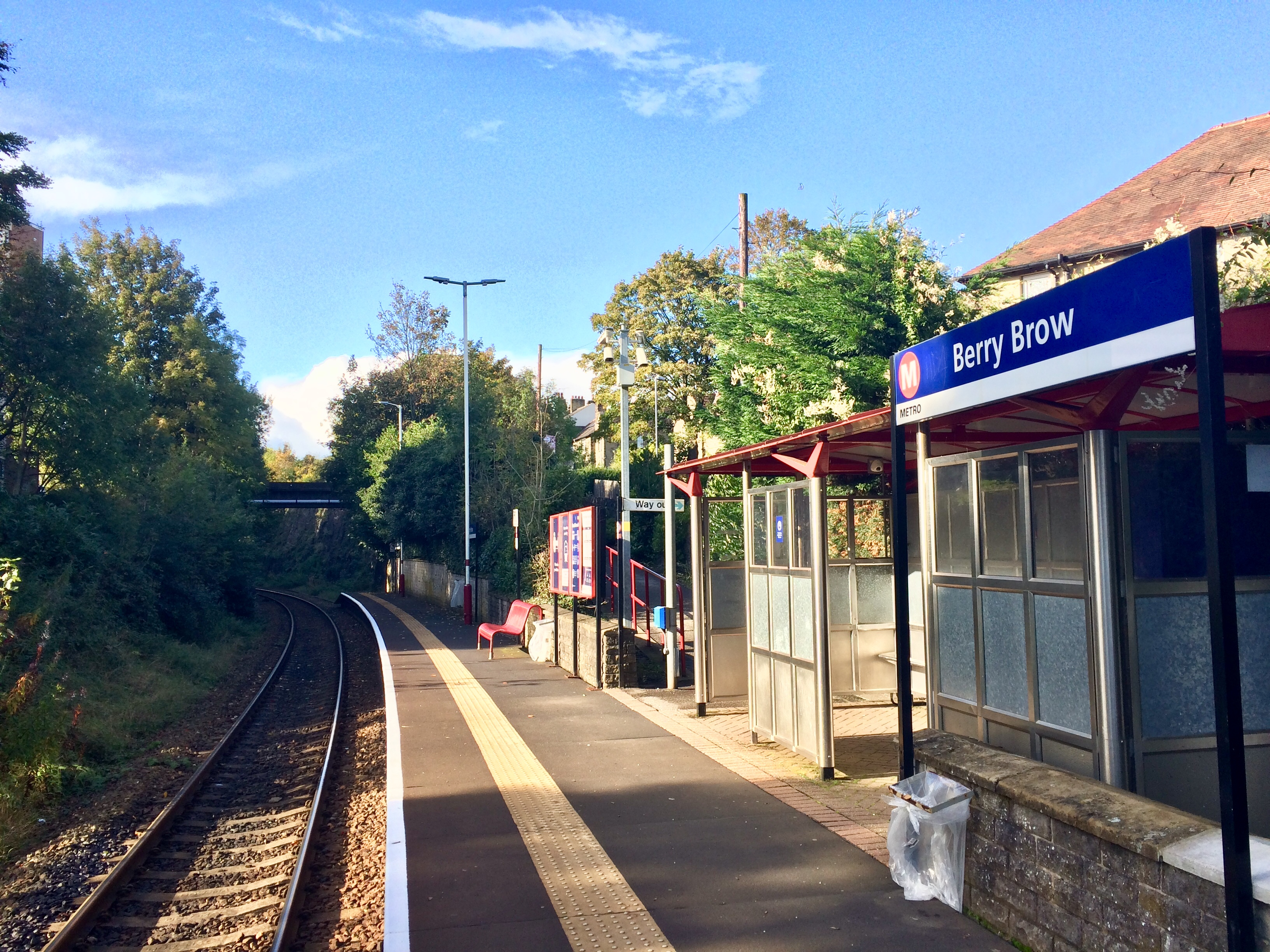

General information
- Location: Berry Brow, Kirklees; England
- Coordinates: 53.6210°N 1.7935°W
- Grid reference: SE137138
- Manager: Northern Trains
- Transit authority: West Yorkshire (Metro)
- Platforms: 1

Other information
- Station code: BBW
- Fare zone: 5
- Classification: DfT category F2

History
- Opened: 9 October 1989; 37 years ago

Passengers
- 2021/22: ▲21,828
- 2022/23: ▲25,202
- 2023/24: ▲26,600
- 2024/25: ▲27,114
- 2025/26: ▼26,420
Location
Notes
- Passenger statistics from the Office of Rail and Road

Berry Brow railway station serves the Huddersfield suburban villages of Berry Brow, Taylor Hill, Armitage Bridge and Newsome in the metropolitan borough of Kirklees in West Yorkshire.

The present single-platform station was opened by British Rail in 1989. It lies some 2.25 miles (3.6 km) south of Huddersfield railway station on the Penistone Line between Huddersfield and Sheffield and is managed by Northern Trains.

The original Berry Brow station was 330 yards (300 m) from the present location, in the direction of Huddersfield. It opened on 1 July 1850 and closed on 2 July 1966.

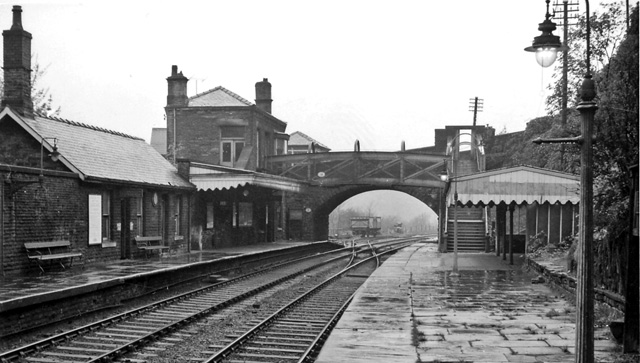
The original station in 1961

== Facilities ==
The station is unstaffed and has a basic shelter on its single platform; all tickets must be bought before boarding via the ticket machine or in advance. Timetable posters and a digital display screen provide train running information. Step-free access is via a steep ramp from the main road above.

== Services ==
All services to the station are operated by Northern Trains. There is an hourly service in both directions on Monday to Saturdays, and on Sundays from mid-morning.

Preceding station	National Rail	Following station
Honley	Northern Trains Penistone line	Lockwood
