= Newsome High School =

Newsome High School may refer to:

- Newsome Academy, a co-educational secondary school in Newsome, England, formerly known as Newsome High School
- Newsome High School (Florida), a public high school in Lithia, Florida, United States
