= Newsome Academy =

Secondary school in Huddersfield, West Yorkshire, England

Location
- Castle Avenue; Newsome; Huddersfield, West Yorkshire, HD4 6JN; England
- Coordinates: 53.624°N 1.792°W

Information
- Type: Academy
- Local authority: Kirklees Council
- Trust: Impact Education Academy Trust
- Department for Education URN: 147888 Tables
- Ofsted: Reports
- Headteacher: Dean Watkin
- Gender: Co-educational
- Age: 11 to 16
- Website: newsomehigh.co.uk

Newsome Academy (formerly Newsome High School and Newsome High School & Sports College) is a co-educational secondary school located in Newsome (near Huddersfield), West Yorkshire, England.

The catchment area of the school includes Newsome, Lowerhouses, Lockwood, Berry Brow and Almondbury.
