= Fred Moorhouse =

English cricketer

Fred Moorhouse (25 March 1880 – 7 April 1933) was an English cricketer who played first-class cricket in 117 matches for Warwickshire between 1900 and 1908. He was born at Berry Brow, Huddersfield, Yorkshire and died at Dudley, then in Worcestershire, now in West Midlands.

The brother of the Yorkshire cricketer Robert Moorhouse, Fred Moorhouse was a professional right-handed lower-order batsman and a right-arm medium-pace bowler. Having played in single match in 1900 and a few games in 1901, all without achieving any success, Moorhouse became a regular player for Warwickshire over the next six seasons. His best season was 1903 when he scored 336 runs at an average of 21 runs per innings and took 55 wickets at the low average of 15.81. Wisden Cricketers' Almanack noted his potential: "He must be reckoned one of the finest all-round players in Warwickshire," it wrote. That season saw his best bowling performance when he took seven second-innings Yorkshire wickets for 53 runs, and 11 for 114 in the match at Hull. He had a further 10-wicket match in 1907 against Worcestershire, with figures of six for 43 and four for 88. His batting did not develop and his highest innings came in 1904 when he scored 75 against London County.

With the recovery from injury of Frank Field and the emergence of Frank Foster in 1908, Moorhouse was unable to retain his place in the 1908 season and he left first-class cricket at the end of the season. He played Minor Counties cricket for Cheshire in 1910 and 1911.
