= Hall Bower =

Hamlet in West Yorkshire, England

Coordinates: 53.62°N 1.78°W

- Location within West Yorkshire
- Metropolitan borough: Kirklees (Newsome ward)
- Metropolitan county: West Yorkshire
- Region: Yorkshire and the Humber
- Country: England
- Sovereign state: United Kingdom
- Post town: HUDDERSFIELD
- Postcode district: HD4
- Dialling code: 01484
- Police: West Yorkshire
- Fire: West Yorkshire
- Ambulance: Yorkshire
- UK Parliament: Huddersfield

Hall Bower is a hamlet lying 2 miles (3.5 km) south of Huddersfield in West Yorkshire, England. It sits in the shadow of Castle Hill, just above the village of Newsome.

== Sport ==
The hamlet has a team in the Huddersfield Cricket League, Hall Bower Cricket Club. Newsome Panthers Rugby League team now play in Hall Bower also, on fields near to the cricket ground.

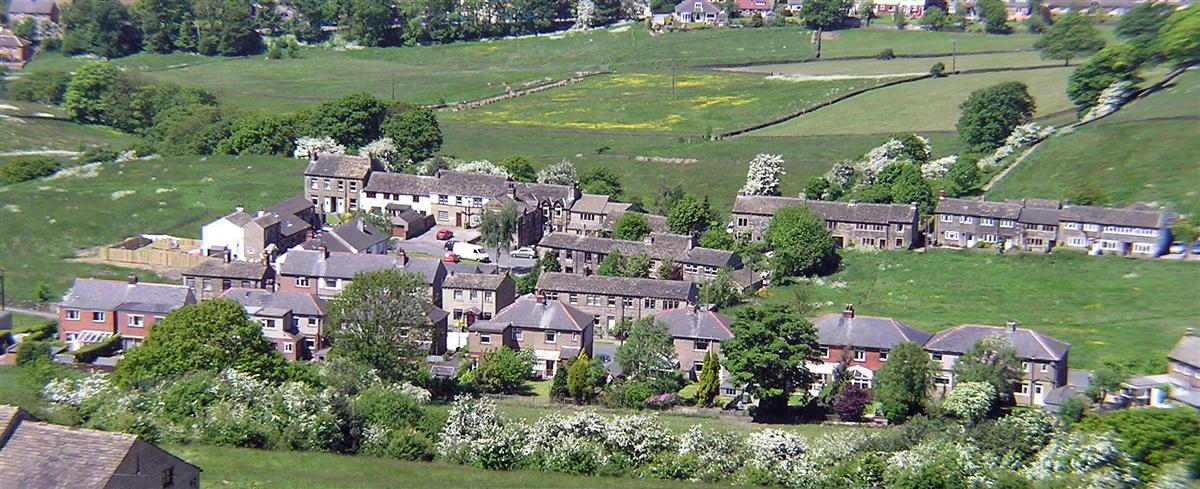
Hall Bower viewed from Castle Hill

.
