= Newsome Panthers =

English amateur rugby league club, based in Huddersfield, West Yorkshire

Club information
- Full name: Newsome Panthers Amateur Rugby League Football Club
- Colours: Red and black
- Founded: 1995; 31 years ago
- Website: www.newsomepanthers.co.uk

Current details
- Ground: Hall Bower, Huddersfield
- Competition: Various

Newsome Panthers ARLFC is an amateur rugby league club based in Newsome, Huddersfield. The club was founded with only two junior teams in 1995 and has since grown into one of the largest clubs in Yorkshire with teams for children of all ages. More recently the club founded an open-age team into which the junior players could progress. The club has eleven junior teams playing the West Riding League and Yorkshire Combination League. The open age team currently play in division 1 of the Pennine League.

== Newsome Magpies ==
The first ever club to play rugby league in the Newsome area was the Newsome Magpies open age team. The team played Newsome High School and Sports College in the village with their home being the Fountain Inn on Towngate in Newsome. The club was established in 1989 by founder members Andy Brewster, Paul Brick, John Taylor and Sue Taylor. The club consisted of one open age team coached by Bryan Ward.

After a period of success during which the club reached Division 1 in the Pennine League, won the Huddersfield Supplementary cup twice and were losing finalists in the LB Holiday Cup once, the club was unfortunately disbanded in 1994/95 due a struggle to find new players.

== Birth of the Panthers ==
Newsome Panthers U13s circa 1995

In 1995, as the Newsome Magpies open age team disbanded, Paul and Gail Brick with the help of a number of willing parents launched a junior section that once up and running would provide a regular supply of able players to the open age team. Due to league rules the name 'Magpies' could not be used. The first official committee meeting was held on Monday 23 October 1995 and the name Panthers was adopted, and the club was born.

The new junior club was still to be based at the Fountain Inn and with home games played at Newsome High School and Sports College. The first season saw an under 9 and an under 11 team enter the West Riding league. As the players in these initial teams got older and the teams moved up through the age groups they were replaced by a steady stream of younger players to the point where the Panthers now have a team for children of all ages above 7 years old in one of their eleven junior teams. In the 2006–2007 season the Panthers had over 180 junior members.

The club hope to add a new age group every season with the aim to score well as a club in the West Riding league.

== Open Age ==
With the original purpose of the junior club in mind, the Panthers founded an open age team in 1999 and entered division 6 of the Pennine League under the banner of Newsome Panthers. The first squad was made up of some ex Magpie players, ex Almondbury Lions players and some new players to the game who together gained promotion to division 5 for the 2000/01 season. The 2000/01 season was a testing time for the Newsome Panthers, losing a number of the founder member players and also suffering through a number of injuries. Through this period the team still held its own in division 5. In the 2001/02 season, five ex-junior players from the successful under 16s squad took their places in the open age squad, helping them to promotion to division 4. In the 2002/03 Season, promotion from division 4 as champions, success in the Huddersfield Supplementary Cup and a place in the final of the Huddersfield Holiday Cup Final cememeted the squad together. In the league the team had a 100% record.

During the 2003/04 season the team won every competition that they were able to take part in. The team achieved promotion to division 2 of the Pennine League and won the Shipley Cup, Holiday Cup and Supplementary Cup. This was achieved under the leadership of Bob Linford & Andy Bainbridge.

The 2004/05 season saw successful retention of the Huddersfield Holiday Cup and Supplementary Cup. A third-place finish in division 2 behind Kippax and New Earswick All Blacks saw the team promoted into the 1st division, the division the Magpies had played in all those years ago.

The 2006/07 season saw the beginning of the transition period where players retired or moved on and the introduction of further players from the junior ranks. After a poor start, where they lost their first 5 games away, the team turned the season around. The introduction of Phil Joseph as head coach with Andy Boothroyd as his assistant and further coaching assistance from Anthony Farrell has ensured that the foundations are now in place going forward.

== Clubmark Award and Hall Bower ==
In 2003, through the hard work of the management committee, the club were awarded the Sport England Clubmark award.

It also became evident that as the club grew, the two fields at Newsome High School and Sports College alone would not be enough to stage the number of games required each weekend. Therefore, in 2003 the club took a 30-year lease on the playing fields at Hall Bower Lane. Games were first played on the fields in September 2004 with the club now splitting games between these fields and the fields at the high school.

== Junior honours ==
=== West Riding League ===
- U16 League Winners: 2000–2001.
- U15 League Winners: 1999–2000, 2006–2007.
- U14 League Winners: 1998–1999, 2004–2005, 2006–2007.
- U13 League Winners: 1997–1998, 2001–2002.
- U13 League Division 1 Winners: 2006–2007.
- U12 League Winners: 2000–2001, 2002–2003

=== West Riding League Challenge Cup ===
- U16 Cup Winners: 2000–2001.
- U15 Cup Winners: 1999–2000, 2006–2007.
- U14 Cup Winners: 1998–1999, 2004–2005, 2006–2007.
- U13 Cup Winners: 1997–1998.
- U12 Cup Winners: 2000–2001, 2002–2003.

=== West Riding League Challenge Plate Winners ===
- U13 Winners: 2004–2005

=== Huddersfield Cup ===
- U16 Cup Winners: 2006–2007.
- U15 Cup Winners: 2001–2002.
- U13 Cup Winners: 1997–1998.
- U14 Cup Winners: 1998–1999, 2006–2007.
- U12 Cup Winners: 2002–2003.
- U13 Cup Winners: 2006–2007.

=== Halifax Cup Winners ===
- U14 Cup Winners: 1998–1999.

=== Yorkshire Cup ===
- U16 – Quarterfinalists 2000–2001.
- U14 – Semifinalists 1998 – 1999.
- U14 – Finalists 2004–2005.
- U14 – Winners 2006–2007.
- U12 – Semifinalists 2000–2001.
- U12 – Finalists 2002–2003.

== Open Age Honours ==
2022 5 times champions League 2 winners 2022 YML trophy winners 2022 Holliday cup winners 2022 Grand final division 2 winners 2022 Supplementary cup winners 2022

- Pennine Shipley Challenge Cup Winners: 2003–2004.
- Holiday Cup Winners: 2003–2004, 2004–2005, 2013–14
- Huddersfield Supplementary Cup Winners: 2003–2004, 2004–2005, 2006–2007.
- Division 3 Pennine League Winners: 2003–2004.
- Division 4 Pennine League Winners: 2002–2003.
- Huddersfield Holiday Cup Runners Up: 2002–2003.
- Division 5 Pennine League Winners: 2001–2002.
- Division 6 Pennine League Winners: 2000–2001.

== Notable former players ==
In its short history the club has already produced a number of players that have received representative honours or earned academy contracts with professional clubs. The following players have turned full professional.

- Philip Joseph: Huddersfield Giants, Swinton Lions, Hull Kingston Rovers, Halifax Blue Sox
- Simon George: Huddersfield Giants
- Jason Crookes: Bradford Bulls
- Leroy Cudjoe: Huddersfield Giants
- James Martin: Huddersfield Giants
- Michael Lawrence: Huddersfield Giants
