= Jason Crookes =

English rugby league footballer (born 1990)

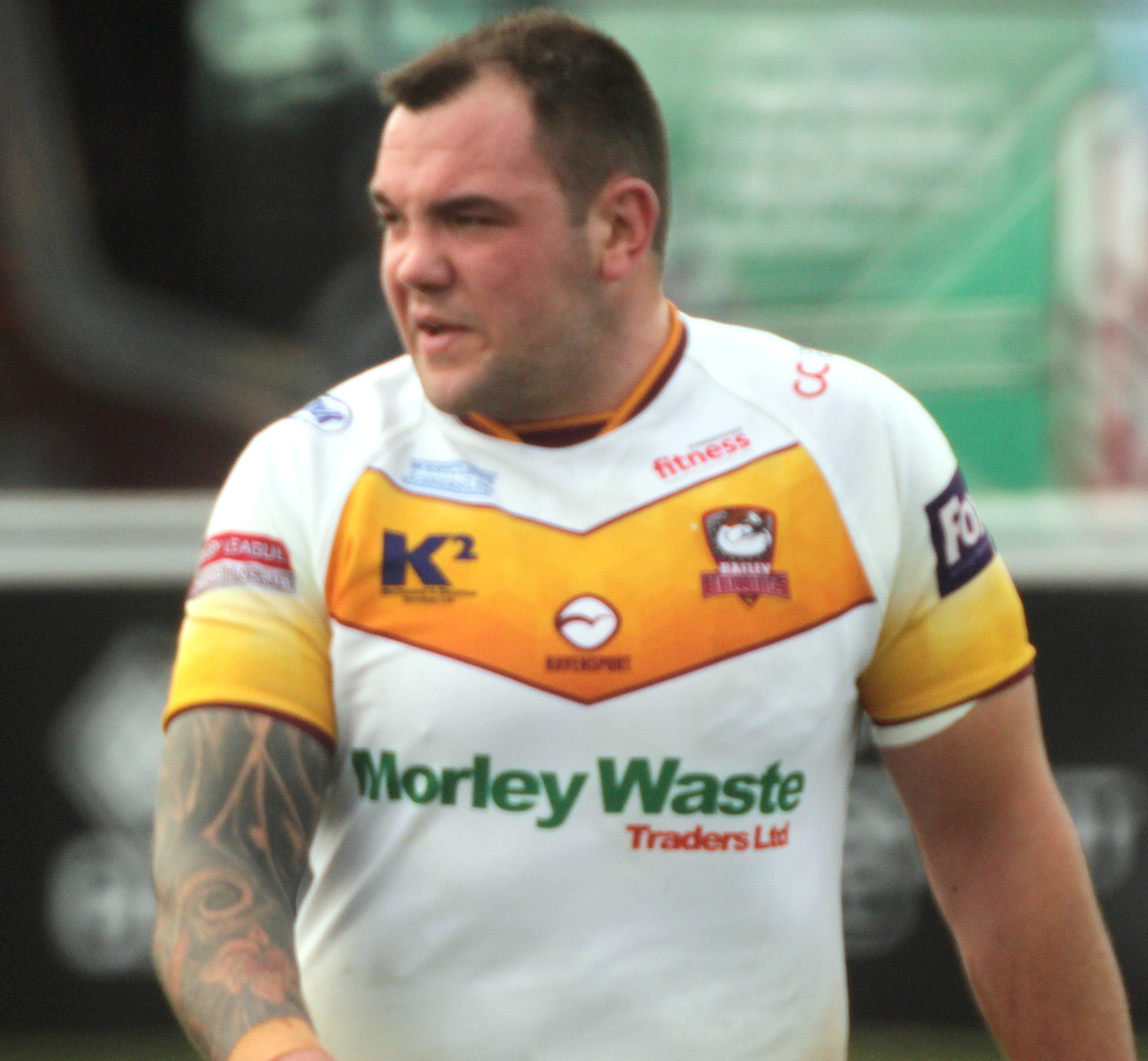

Personal information
- Born: 21 April 1990 (age 36) Huddersfield, West Yorkshire, England
- Height: 5 ft 10 in (178 cm)
- Weight: 14 st 2 lb (90 kg)

Playing information
- Position: Centre, Wing
Club
Years	Team	Pld	T	G	FG	P
2007–12	Bradford Bulls	27	7	0	0	28
2008(loan)	→ Widnes Vikings	11	5	0	0	20
2011(loan)	→ Sheffield Eagles	7	4	0	0	16
2013–14	Hull F.C.	18	5	0	0	20
2013(loan)	→ York City Knights	1	0	0	0	0
2015–17	Dewsbury Rams	64	16	0	0	64
2017–18	Batley Bulldogs	43	15	0	0	60
2019–	Sheffield Eagles	15	4	0	0	16
	Total	186	56	0	0	224
- Source: As of 23 July 2019

Jason Crookes (born 21 April 1990) is an English rugby league footballer who plays as a centre or winger for the Sheffield Eagles in the Championship.

== Background ==
Crookes was born in Huddersfield, West Yorkshire, England.

== Bradford ==
Crookes played junior rugby for Newsome in Huddersfield before signing for the Bradford Bulls in 2007. He was loaned out to Widnes Vikings for the 2008 season.

=== 2009 season ===
Crookes made his Super League début against Hull in Round 5. His next appearance would be the win over local rivals Leeds Rhinos where he was on the subs bench and his final game in 2009 he again started at Centre against Wakefield Trinity Wildcats.

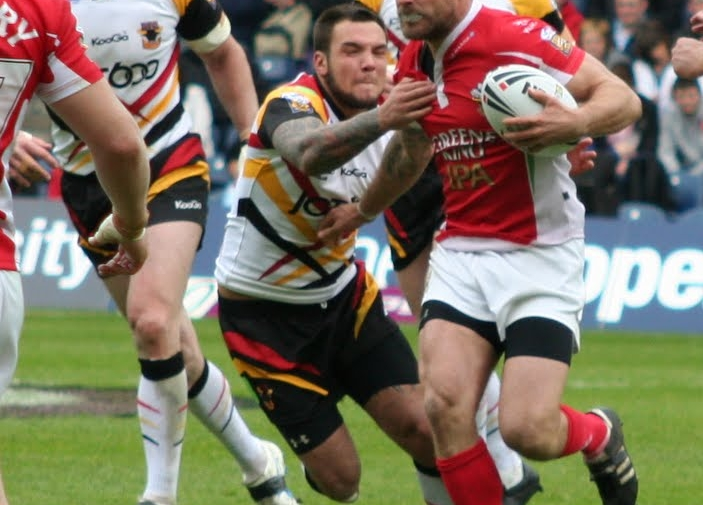
Crookes in action for Bradford

=== 2010 season ===
Crookes appeared in all four pre-season friendlies.

Crookes first game of 2010 was against Wigan Warriors in place of the injured Rikki Sheriffe. He also played against Crusaders in the Magic Weekend. His next league appearance would be in Round 25 (St. Helens) then in Round 26 against Wakefield Trinity. He also played in the Challenge Cup tie against the Dewsbury Rams. At the end of the season Jason Crookes signed a new 2-year contract to stay with the Bradford Bulls.

=== 2011 season ===
Crookes featured in three of the four pre-season games. He played against Halifax, Dewsbury and Keighley. Jason scored a try against Halifax. He was then sent on dual-registration with Championship side Sheffield Eagles.

Crookes appeared in six consecutive games from Round 15 (Salford City Reds) to Round 20 (Catalans Dragons). He has not featured in any more league or cup games.

=== 2012 season ===
Crookes featured in three of the four pre-season friendlies. He played against Castleford Tigers, Dewsbury and Hull. Jason scored a try against Castleford and another against Hull.

Jason featured in nine consecutive games from Round 1 (Catalans Dragons) to Round 9 (Hull). He was injured from Round 10–22 and Round 4–5 in the Challenge Cup. He featured in Round 24 (Hull Kingston Rovers) to Round 27 (Catalans Dragons). Crookes scored against Wigan (1 try), Warrington Wolves (1 try), Hull Kingston Rovers (4 tries) and Hull (1 try).

== Hull ==
On 19 September, Hull FC announced they had signed Crookes on a three-year deal.

=== 2013 season ===
Crookes featured in three consecutive games from Round 1 (Leeds) to Round 3 (St Helens). Jason was injured from Round 4 to Round 7. Crookes featured in Round 8 (London Broncos). Jason played in Round 10 (Wakefield Trinity) and then again in Round 12 (Salford). He did not feature again until Round 18 (Catalans Dragons) to Round 19 (Castleford). Jason's next game was Round 25 (Salford) to Round 27 (St Helens). Jason featured in the playoffs against Catalans Dragons and Huddersfield Giants. Crookes also featured in the Challenge Cup against North Wales Crusaders, and in the Final against Wigan. He scored against the Bradford Bulls (1 try), St. Helens (1 try) and Wigan (3 tries).

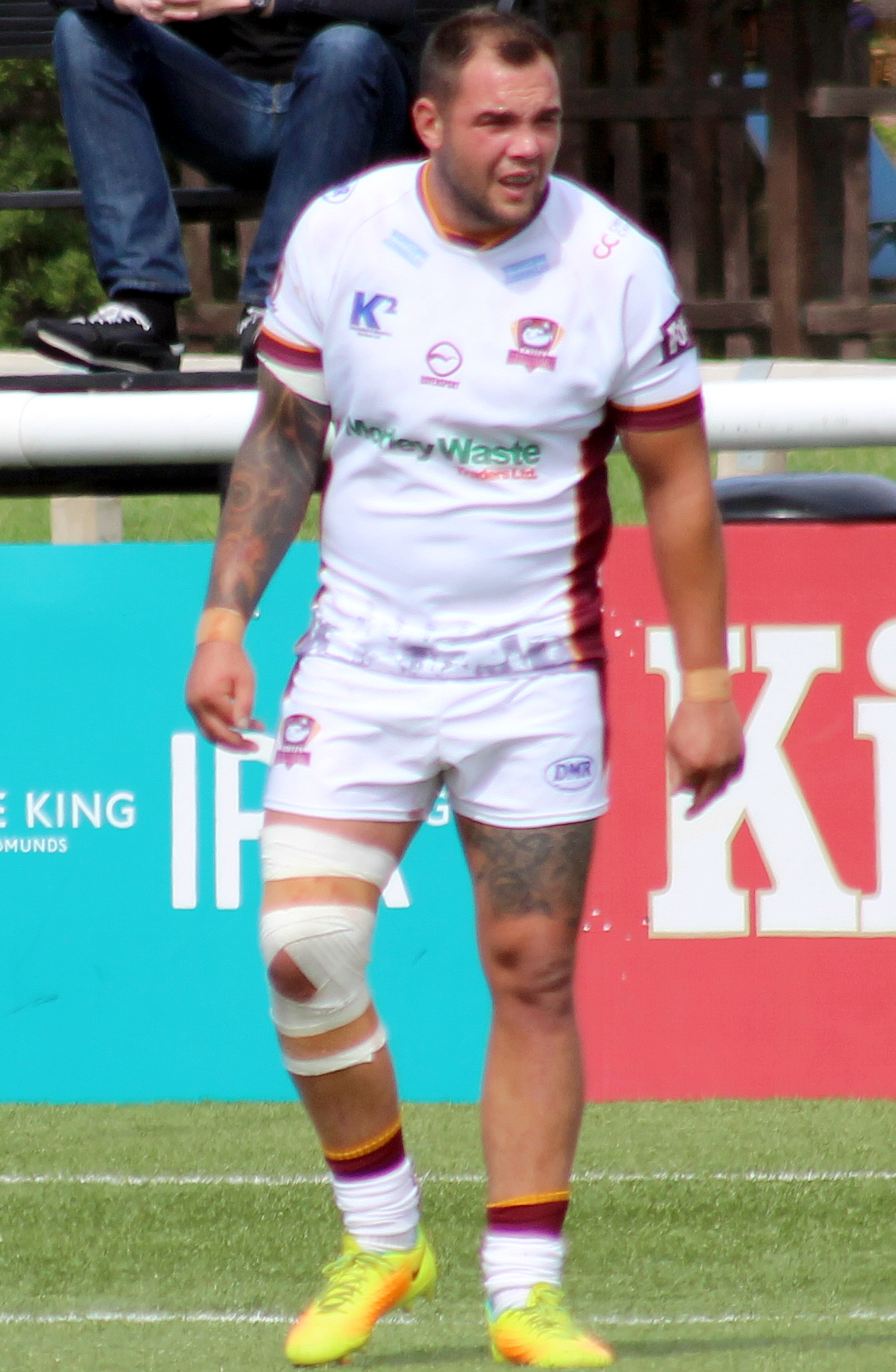
Crookes in action for Batley

=== 2014 season ===
Crookes featured in Round 11 (Wakefield Trinity) to Round 13 (Hull Kingston Rovers). He was released from the final year of his contract at the end of the season.

== Statistics ==
Season	Appearance	Tries	Goals	D/G	Points
2009 Bradford	3	0	0	0	0
2010 Bradford	5	0	0	0	0
2011 Bradford	6	0	0	0	0
2012 Bradford	13	7	0	0	28
2013 Hull	15	5	0	0	20
2014 Hull	3	0	0	0	0
Total	45	12	0	0	48
