= Frank Vickerman =

Historical English figure

Frank Vickerman was a man in the early 19th century who lived in the West Riding of Yorkshire, who owned a wool processing factory at Taylor Hill that was attacked by the Luddites on 15 March 1812. The factory was destroyed, and arson was attempted. Vickerman was targeted by this antitechnological growth organization partly because the machines in his factory were taking the jobs of actual people but also because he had been previously involved in an anti-Luddite committee.
