= Honley railway station =

Railway station in West Yorkshire, England

Honley
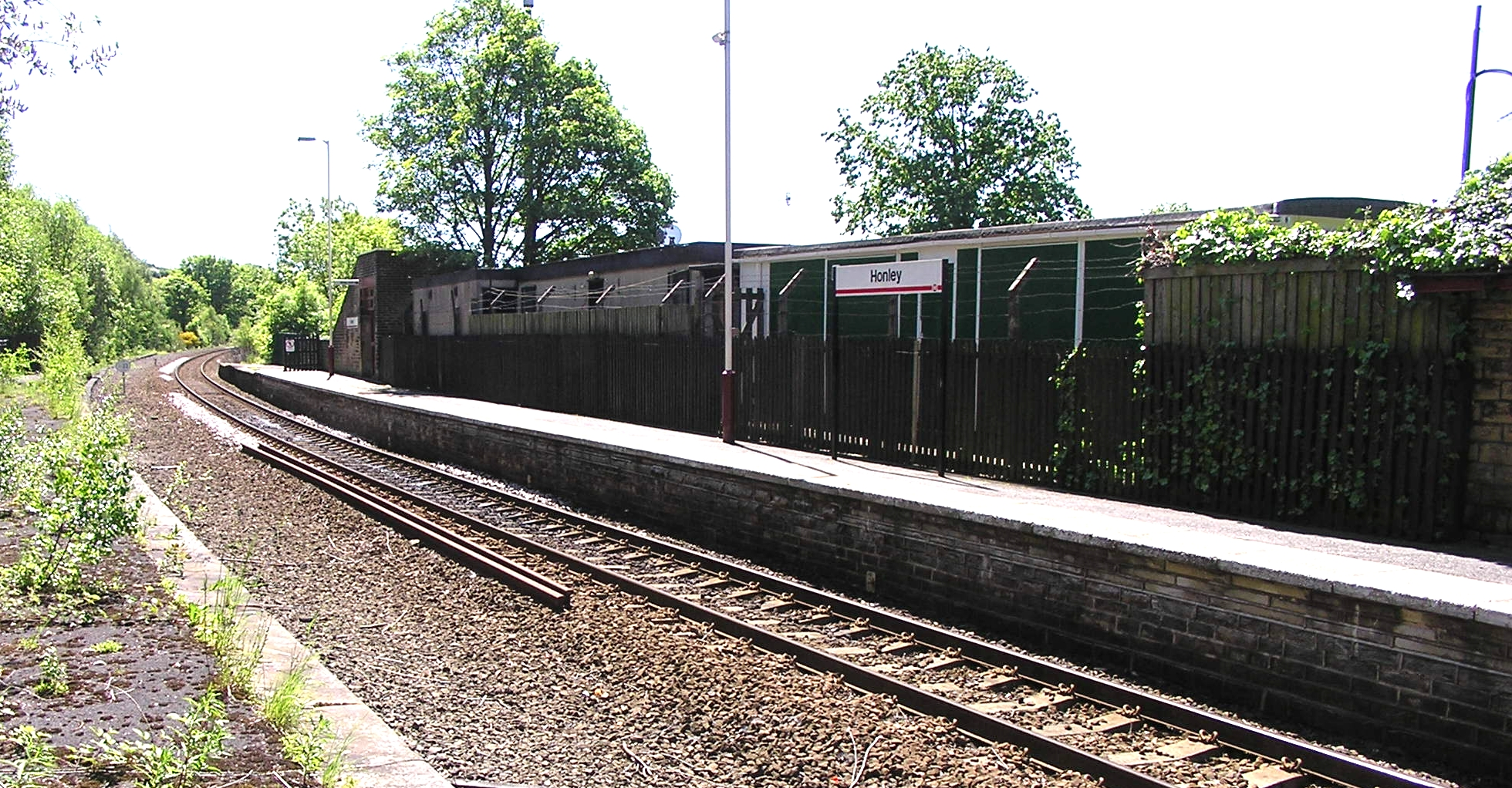

General information
- Location: Honley, Kirklees; England
- Coordinates: 53.6082°N 1.7809°W
- Grid reference: SE145124
- Manager: Northern Trains
- Transit authority: West Yorkshire (Metro)
- Platforms: 1

Other information
- Station code: HOY
- Fare zone: 5
- Classification: DfT category F2

History
- Opened: 1 July 1850; 176 years ago

Passengers
- 2021/22: ▲34,516
- 2022/23: ▲40,884
- 2023/24: ▲41,938
- 2024/25: ▲45,226
- 2025/26: ▲46,192
Location
Notes
- Passenger statistics from the Office of Rail and Road

Honley railway station serves the village of Honley, in the Holme Valley of West Yorkshire, England. It lies approximately 3 miles (4.8 km) from Huddersfield on the Penistone Line, with services operated by Northern Trains.

== History ==
The station was opened by the Huddersfield & Sheffield Junction Railway, a constituent company of the Lancashire & Yorkshire Railway, in 1850.

The railway line through Honley has been single tracked since 1989, with only one platform (the former northbound one) in use for both directions.

== Facilities ==
In August 2013, plans were released to install electronic customer real-time information screens (CIS) at the station. It was later revealed by Metro that they were to be installed in May/June 2015. As of December 2016, these are now in use.

The station is unstaffed, but there is a ticket vending machine at the entrance to the station; a customer help point and CIS screens also offer train running information. A single waiting shelter is located next to the station entrance. There is no step-free access, as the platform is above street level and can only be reached by stairs from the street below.

== Services ==
Trains operate hourly between Huddersfield and Sheffield, via Barnsley.

Preceding station	National Rail	Following station
Brockholes	Northern Trains Sheffield - Huddersfield	Berry Brow

== Gallery ==
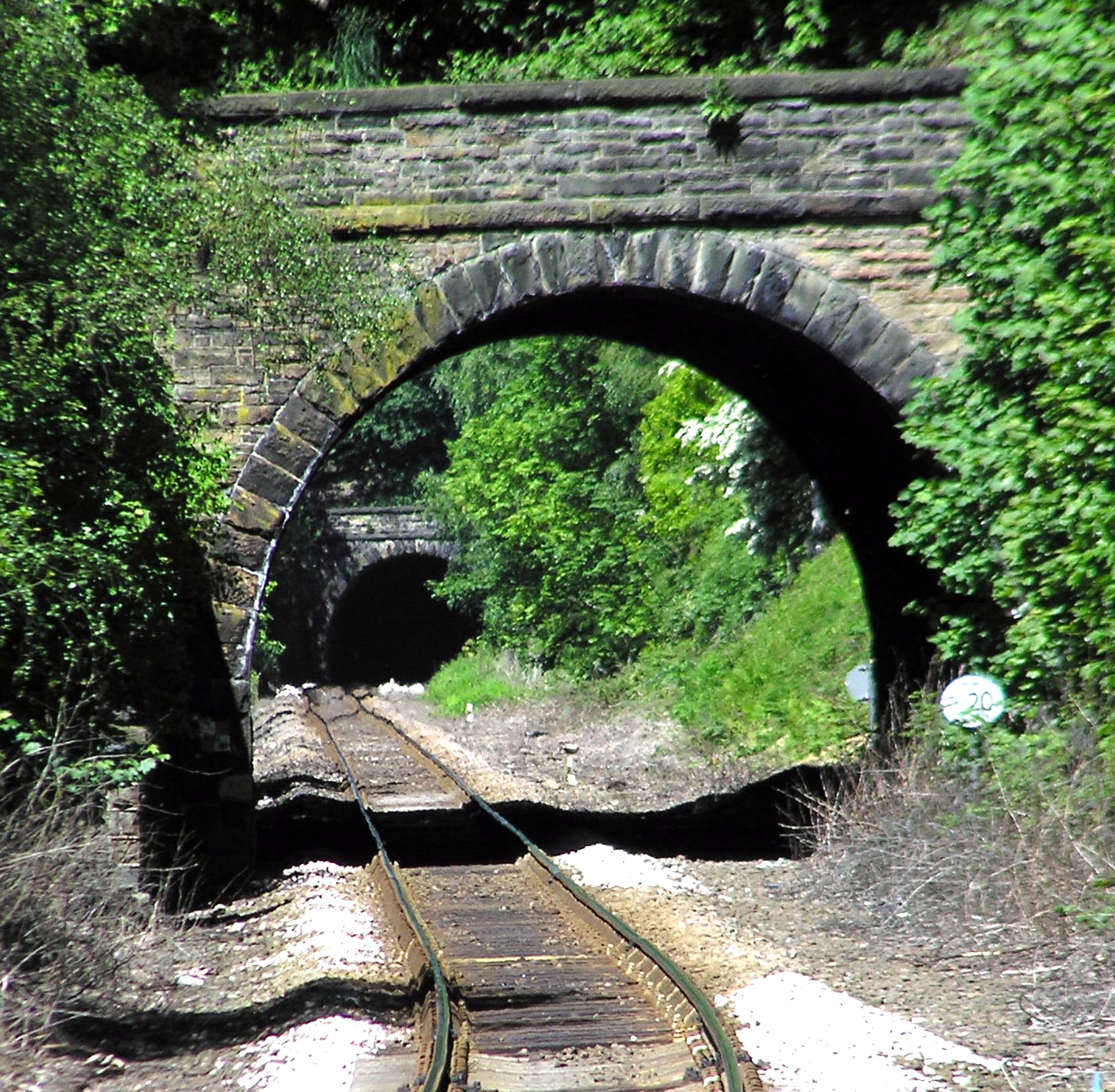
Honley Tunnel

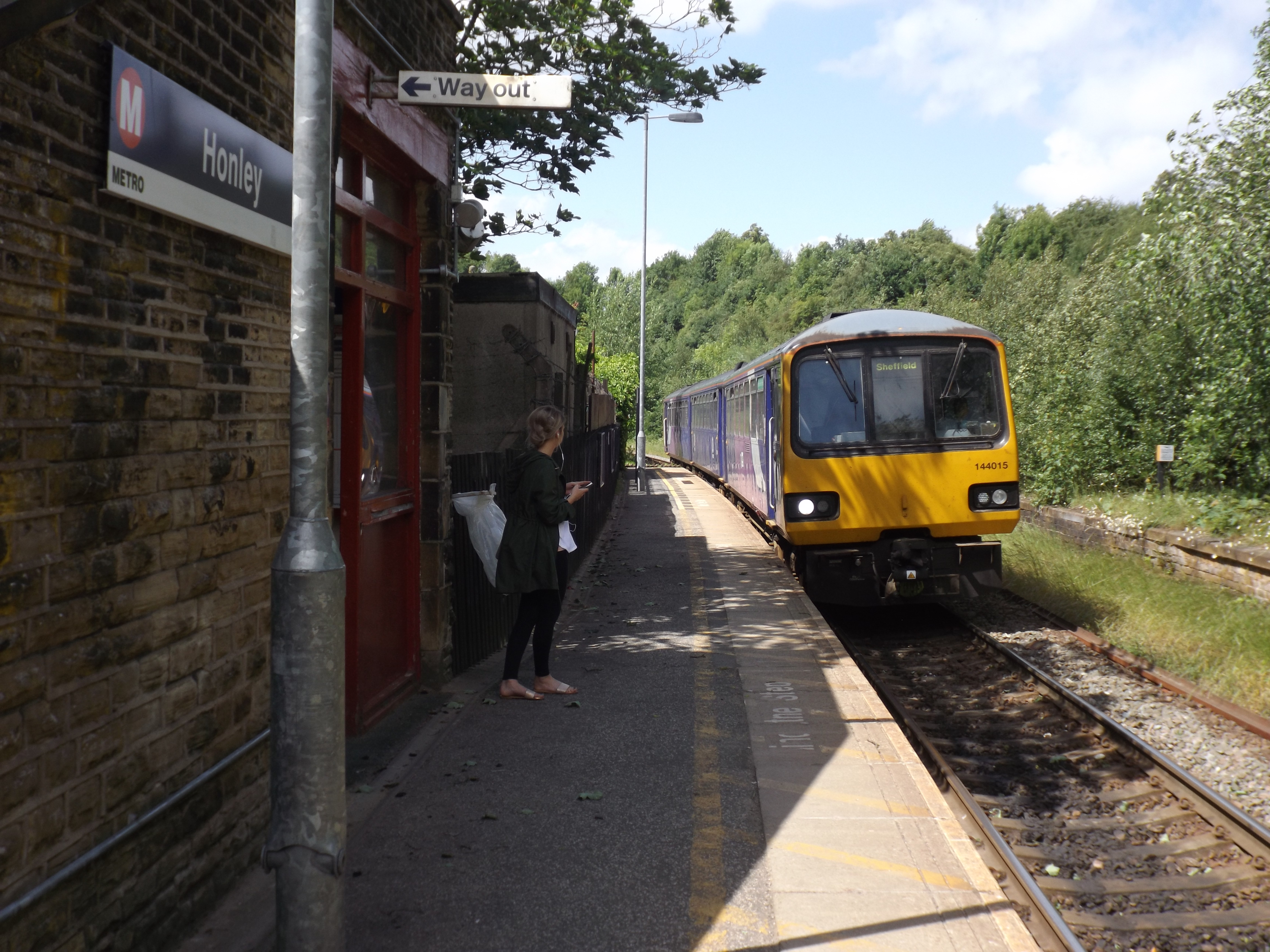
A platform view in 2018

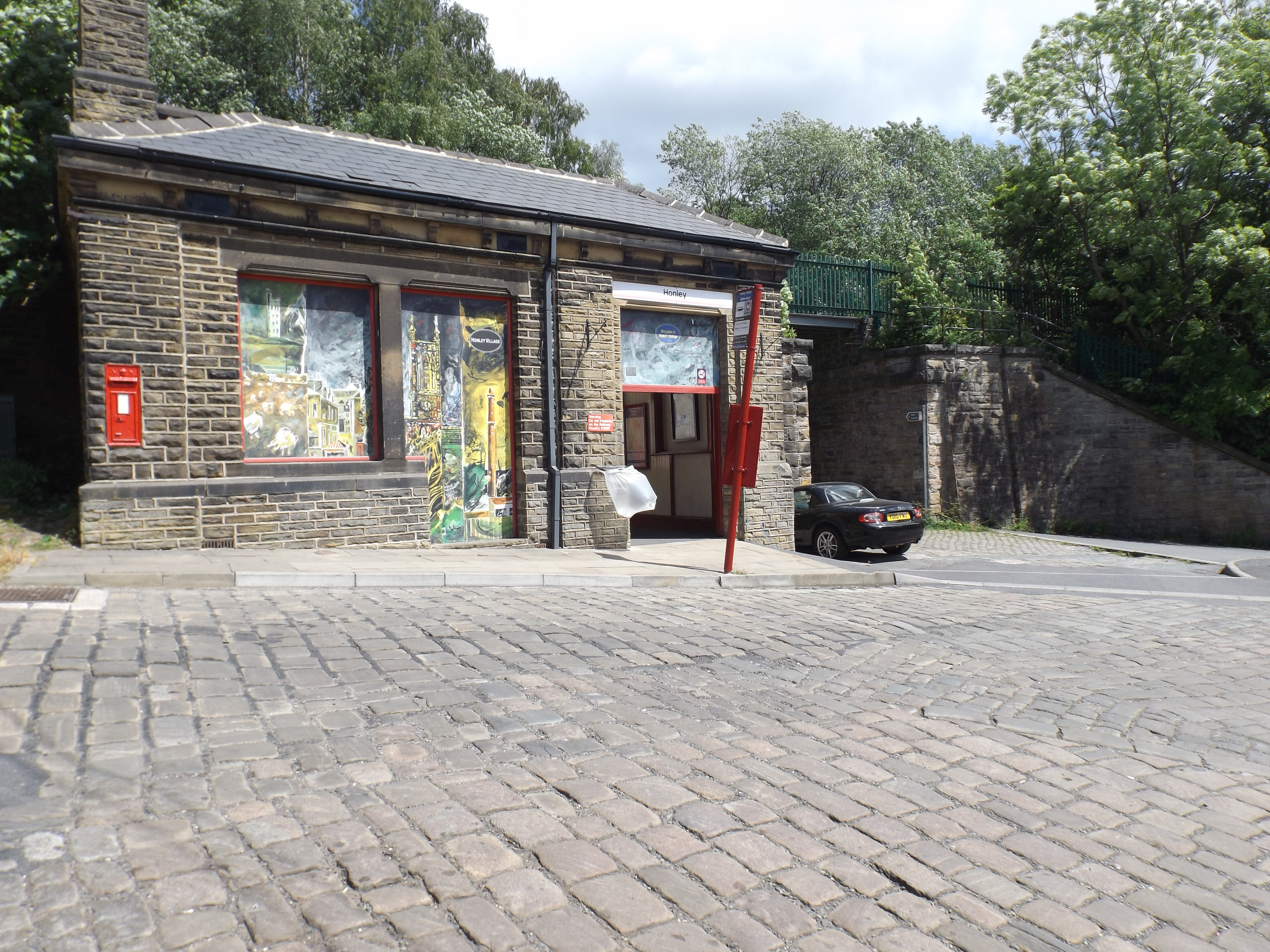
The station building in 2018
