= Newsome =

Village in West Yorkshire, England

Coordinates: 53.626°N 1.785°W

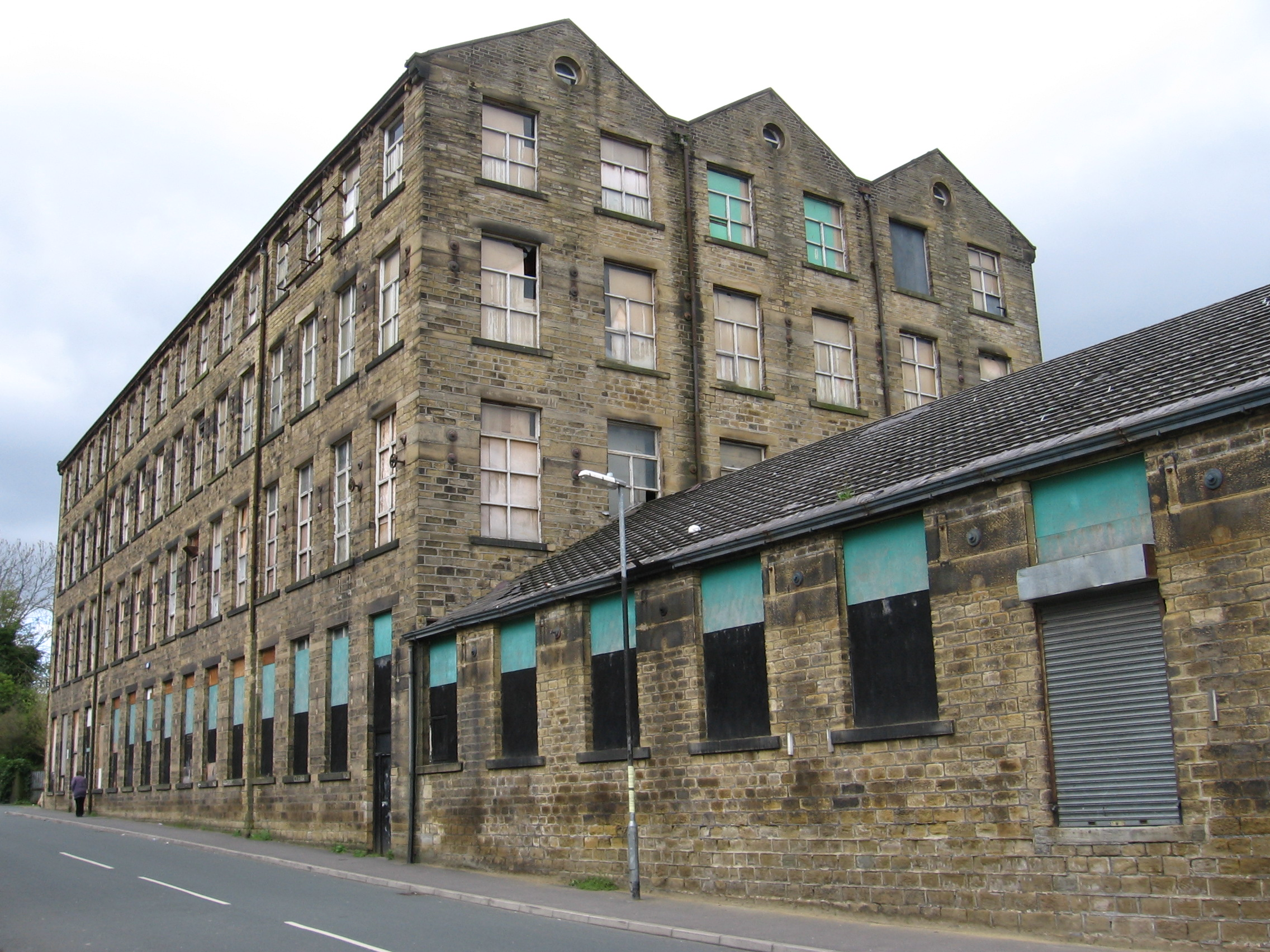
- Newsome Mill

- Location within West Yorkshire
- Population: 911
- Metropolitan borough: Kirklees
- Metropolitan county: West Yorkshire
- Region: Yorkshire and the Humber
- Country: England
- Sovereign state: United Kingdom
- Post town: HUDDERSFIELD
- Postcode district: HD4
- Dialling code: 01484
- Police: West Yorkshire
- Fire: West Yorkshire
- Ambulance: Yorkshire
- UK Parliament: Huddersfield

Newsome is a village situated approximately 1 mile south of Huddersfield, West Yorkshire, England. It is in the Metropolitan Borough of Kirklees. The village lies at the centre of Newsome Ward to which it gives its name.

== Geography ==
Newsome stands on a shoulder of land below Castle Hill and above the valley where the River Holme meets the River Colne. The village lies between Berry Brow, Hall Bower and Taylor Hill.

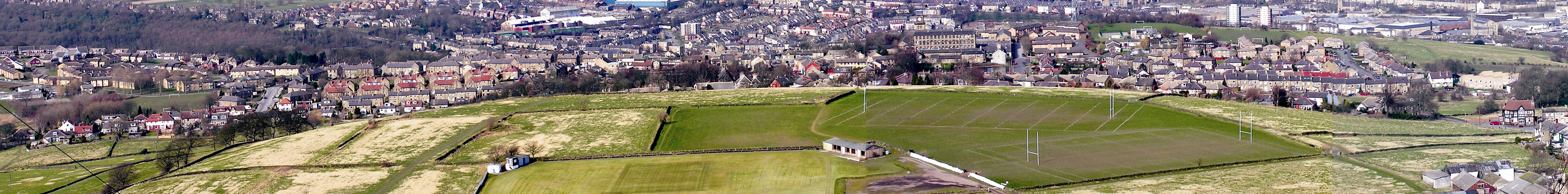
Newsome viewed from Castle Hill

== Facilities ==
The village has both housing and industrial units, the latter mostly within the site of the former Newsome Mill, which used to produce woollen textiles.

Newsome used to have a large bakehouse, (which made award-winning pork pies), but these industrial units, (across from, now damaged, Newsome Mill), now hold businesses. The Huddersfield Examiner announced in February 2013 the closure to the Huddersfield shops, as well as the bakehouse.

=== Schools ===
There is a secondary school, Newsome Academy to the south west of the village centre. The school's assistant head teacher was named West Yorkshire Teacher of the Year 2006 for an award sponsored by Pulse Radio. The Victorian infant and nursery school 'Stile Common Infant and Nursery School', close to the village centre, was closed down and replaced by newly built Hillside Primary School. A specialist school, Castle Hill school, for children aged 3–19, with Severe Learning Difficulties and Profound and Multiple Learning Disabilities, is located to the south west of the village, by Berry Brow, to support children from within the Huddersfield catchment area. The Huddersfield Examiner announced on 11 July 2009 that the specialist school in Newsome had one confirmed case of swine flu.

=== Sport ===
Newsome FC are an open age amateur football club. The club play their home fixtures at the former Primrose Hill Cricket Ground in Primrose Hill now called the Westgate Barbers Arena. They field teams in the Premier Division of the West Yorkshire Association Football League and Division One of the Huddersfield and District Association League and are affiliated to the West Riding County Football Association. The third team are Champions of HDAFL Reserve Division 1 and holders of the Richardson Cup.

The Newsome Panthers, an amateur rugby league club, are based here. The club fields ten junior teams and an open age team in several leagues operated by British Amateur Rugby League Association. The club plays their home games at the secondary school and the committee meets in one of the village's public houses, The Fountain Inn.

== Transport ==
The nearest Mainline railway station is in Huddersfield. Berry Brow on the Penistone Line is the closest local railway station. There are several bus service routes through the village, run by First Calderdale & Huddersfield and Team Penine.
