= Armitage Bridge =

Village in West Yorkshire, England

Coordinates: 53.6185°N 1.7968°W

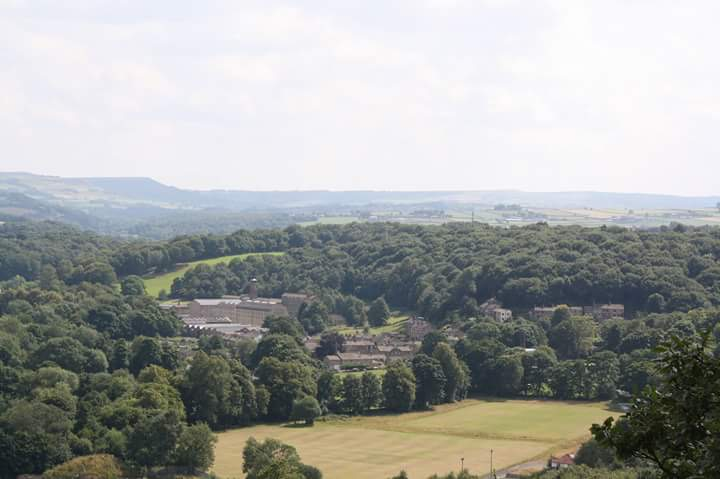
- Armitage Bridge

- Location within West Yorkshire
- Metropolitan borough: Kirklees
- Metropolitan county: West Yorkshire
- Region: Yorkshire and the Humber
- Country: England
- Sovereign state: United Kingdom
- Post town: HUDDERSFIELD
- Postcode district: HD4
- Dialling code: 01484
- Police: West Yorkshire
- Fire: West Yorkshire
- Ambulance: Yorkshire
- UK Parliament: Huddersfield

Armitage Bridge is a village approximately 3 miles (4.8 km) south of Huddersfield, in the Holme Valley, West Yorkshire, England. It is situated between Berry Brow and South Crosland and straddles the River Holme. The village has a public house, a cricket club and a renowned banjo shop.

== Brooke Mill ==
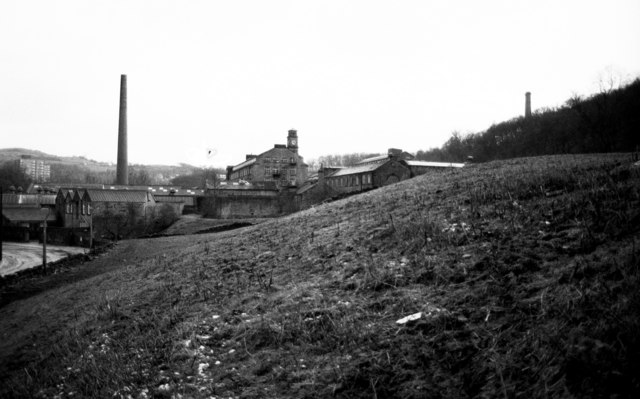
Brooke Mill

The village is dominated by the large former woollen mill of John Brooke and Sons, reputedly the oldest family business in the country, having been founded in 1541. The mill has now been converted into the Yorkshire Technology and Office Park.

== St Paul's ==
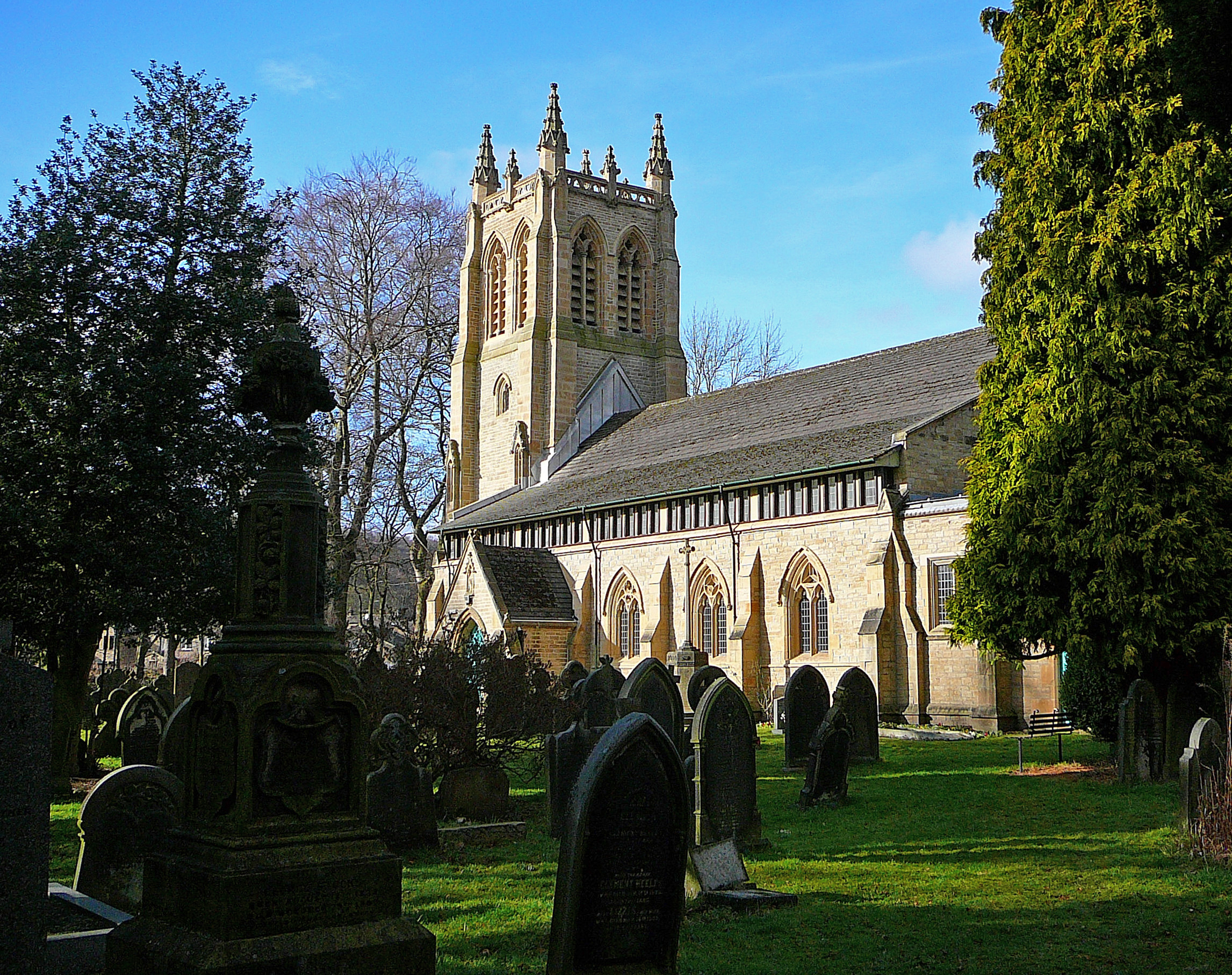
St Paul's Church

The local church is St Paul's and it was built in 1848, with a donation from the Brooke family. Partially destroyed in 1987, by fire, and rebuilt in 1990. The church's current clergy is the Rev Julie Anderson.

== Notable buildings ==
Armitage Bridge House is a Grade II listed building dating from the early 19th century, in neo-classical style.

There is a terrace of listed mill cottages on Dean Brook Road.

== Gallery ==
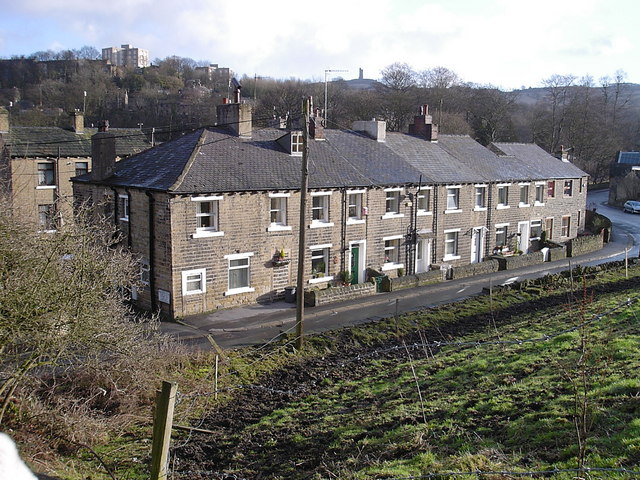
Former mill cottages

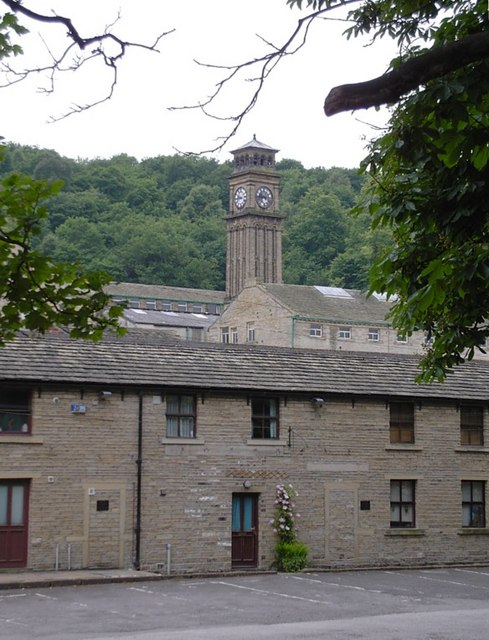
Brooke Mill Clock Tower

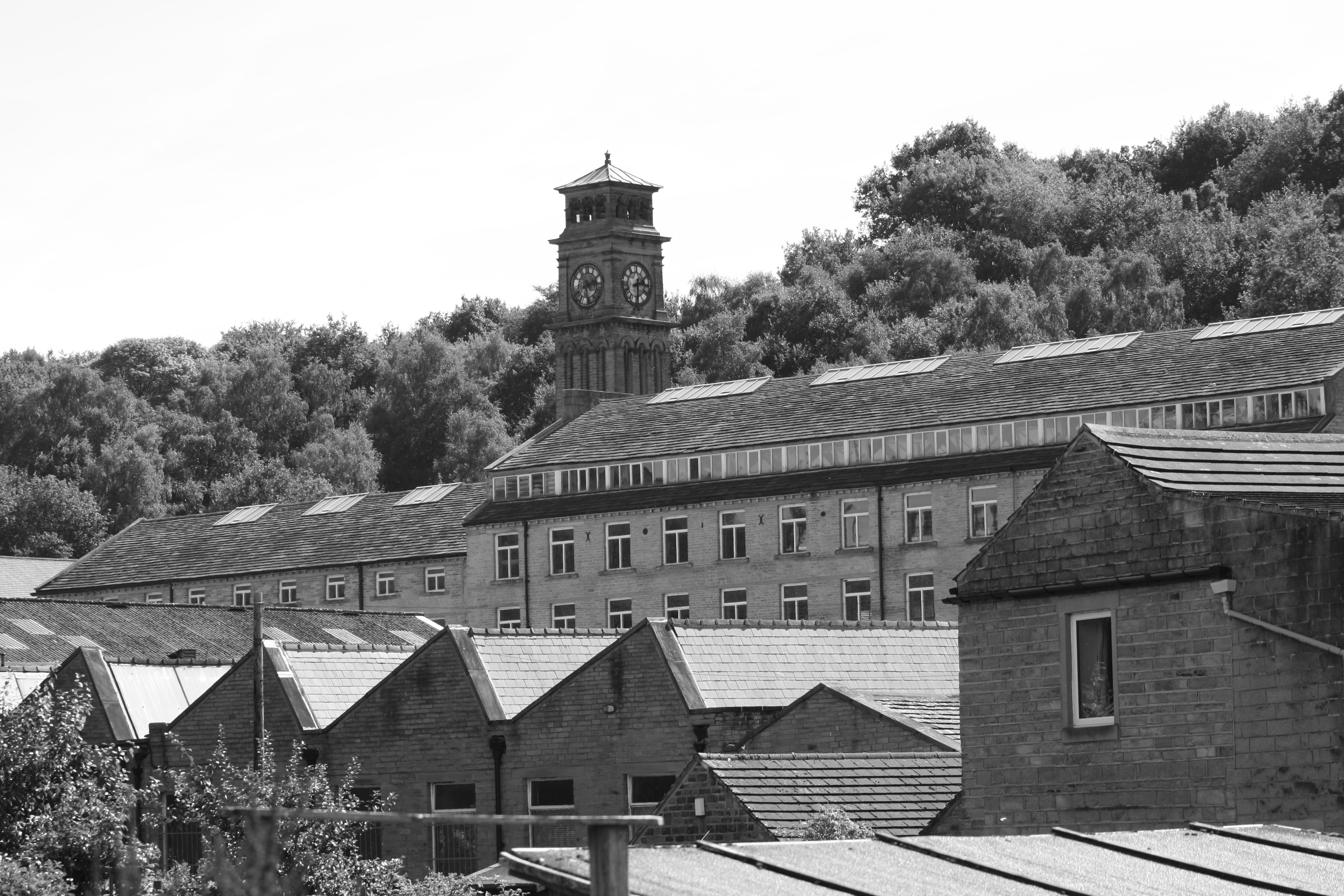
Brooke's Mill

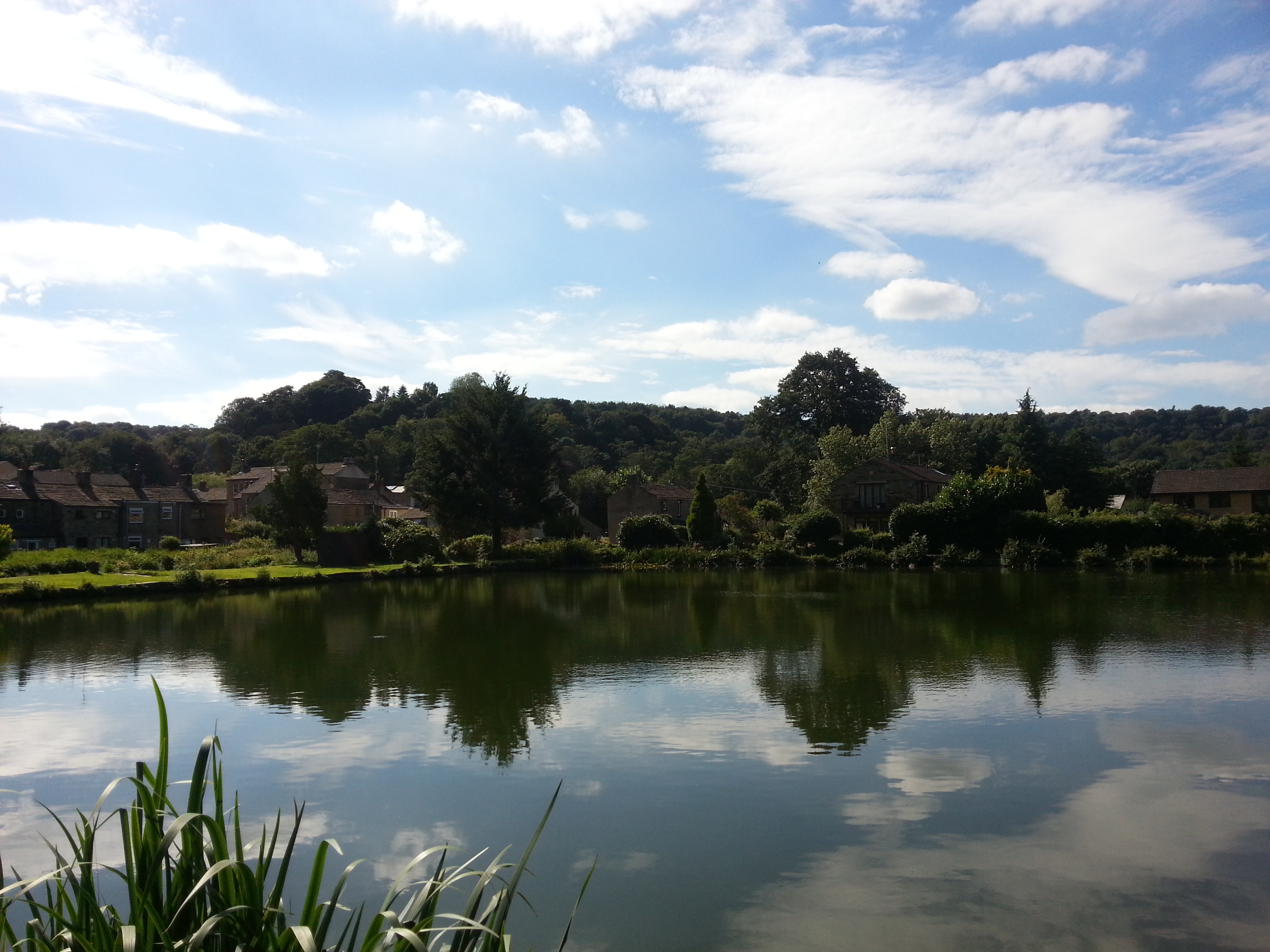
Armitage Bridge

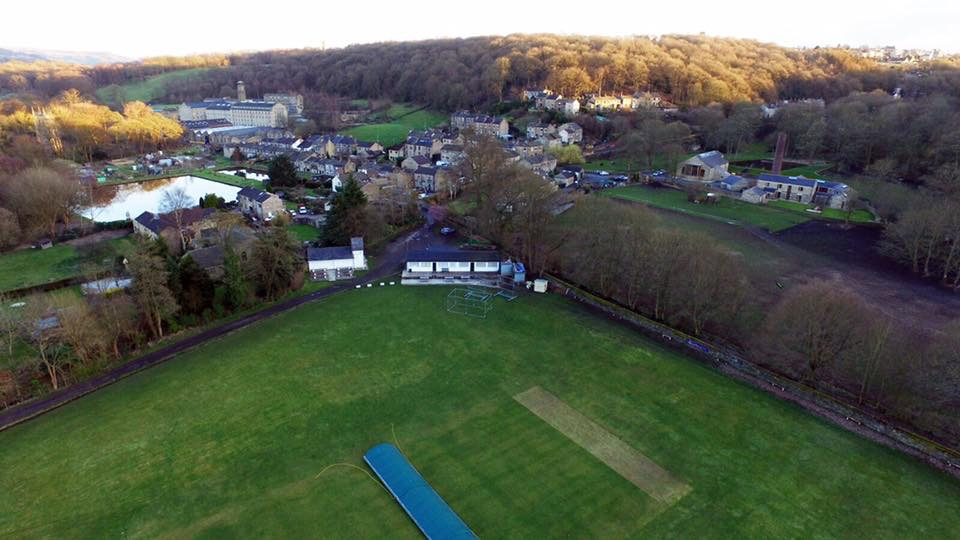
Armitage Bridge Cricket Club in the foreground. Village and Brooke's Mill behind.

== See also ==
- Listed buildings in Huddersfield (Newsome Ward - outer areas)
