= Taylor Hill, Huddersfield =

Coordinates: 53.626331°N 1.798475°W

Taylor Hill
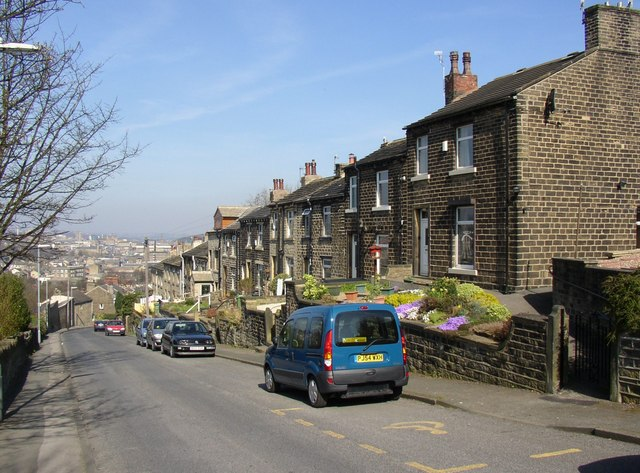
- Taylor Hill Road in Taylor Hill

- Location within West Yorkshire
- Metropolitan borough: Kirklees
- Metropolitan county: West Yorkshire
- Region: Yorkshire and the Humber
- Country: England
- Sovereign state: United Kingdom
- Post town: HUDDERSFIELD
- Postcode district: HD4
- Dialling code: 01484
- Police: West Yorkshire
- Fire: West Yorkshire
- Ambulance: Yorkshire
- UK Parliament: Huddersfield

Taylor Hill is a semi rural/industrial urban village of the town of Huddersfield in the English county of West Yorkshire. It lies on a hill above the A616 road to Honley and Penistone and the eastern bank of the River Holme, in the Holme Valley, approximately 1.5 miles (2 km) to the south of Lockwood, west of Newsome and to the north of Berry Brow.

Administratively, Taylor Hill is in the Newsome Ward of the Metropolitan Borough of Kirklees, the latter of which includes all of Huddersfield and surrounding areas.

== History ==
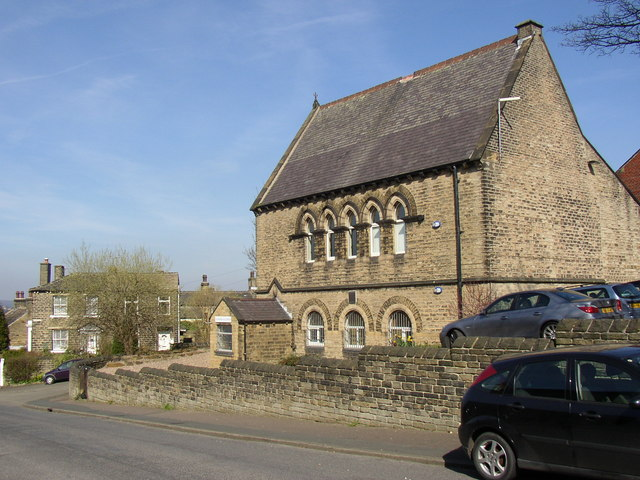
The former chapel in Taylor Hill road

On 15 March 1812, Taylor Hill was the site of the first large-scale Luddite operation in the West Riding, when the cloth-finishing shop of Frank Vickerman was attacked. Vickerman had previously been involved in coordinating the military and civil response to the Luddite threat, and a warning letter had been thrown into his premises several days earlier. Despite a guard being set on the premises, the Luddites succeeded in destroying ten shearing frames, 30 shears, a quantity of wool and every window in the building.

== Industry ==
The former Vickerman & Sons Ltd woollen mill, on Fairlea Road has been converted into several smaller industrial units, which include a carpet manufacturers, commercial & industrial photographers, printers and lithographers, wedding cake bakery, Wrought ironwork services, clothing manufacturers & wholesalers and an independent domestic energy assessment services. The former Victorian village chapel has been converted into a Hydraulic engineers.

== Education ==
There is a secondary school, Newsome High School and Sports College that is 0.5 miles (0.8 km) to the east; one of three secondary schools in the area governed by Kirklees to be recognised as a specialist sports college since the government's inception of the programme in 1994. The school's assistant head teacher was named West Yorkshire Teacher of the Year 2006 for an award sponsored by Pulse 1 radio.

The area is also home to Kirklees College's Taylor Hill Centre, on Close Hill Road. This provides full-time courses relating to animal care, land-based studies, conservation and countryside management.

== Transport ==
Berry Brow railway station is the closest local railway station, being about 0.5 miles (0.8 km) to the south-east. Trains on Northern's Penistone Line provide an hourly service (less frequent on Sundays) between Huddersfield and Sheffield stations, calling at Berry Brow. Huddersfield station provides interchange with direct services to Leeds, Manchester and other north of England destinations, whilst Sheffield station provides interchange with direct trains to London.

Bus route 306 run by First Calderdale & Huddersfield passes through the village, linking it to Huddersfield town centre every 20 minutes.

The closest main road is the A616 road to Honley and Penistone.

== See also ==
- Listed buildings in Huddersfield (Newsome Ward - outer areas)
