= Berry Brow =

Village in West Yorkshire, England

Coordinates: 53.619°N 1.781°W

- Location within West Yorkshire
- Metropolitan borough: Kirklees
- Metropolitan county: West Yorkshire
- Region: Yorkshire and the Humber
- Country: England
- Sovereign state: United Kingdom
- Post town: Huddersfield
- Postcode district: HD4
- Dialling code: 01484
- Police: West Yorkshire
- Fire: West Yorkshire
- Ambulance: Yorkshire
- UK Parliament: Huddersfield

Berry Brow is a semi-rural village in West Yorkshire, England, situated about 2 miles (3 km) south of Huddersfield. It lies on the eastern bank of the Holme Valley and partially straddles the A616 road to Honley and Penistone.

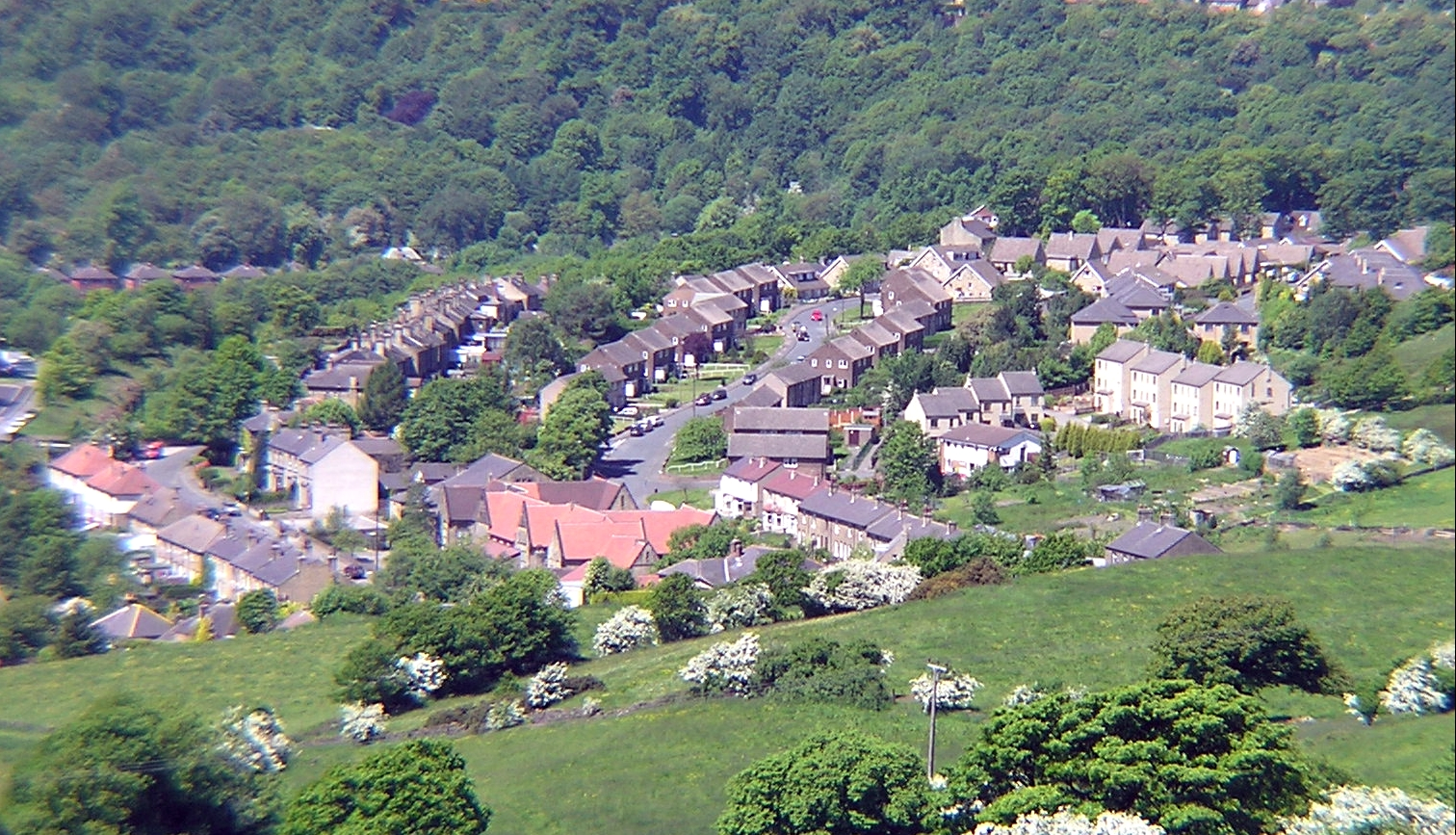
View of the northern end of Berry Brow showing school and the Caldercliffe Road area

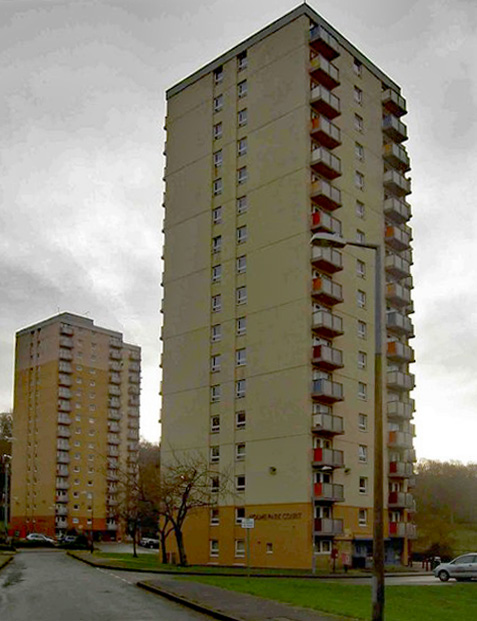
Bishop's Court flats.

The village has a Victorian infants' and nursery school, some shops and a railway station on the Penistone Line. It lies between Armitage Bridge, Taylor Hill and Newsome. Berry Brow is served by two public houses (The Railway and The Golden Fleece) and a liberal club. The site of a third public house, The Black Bull, was converted into an Indian restaurant in 1994, and received planning permission to expand capacity in 2011.

In the bottom of the valley are two high rise buildings, built in the 1960s in an attempt to modernise the village. These reached public notoriety in the 1980s when they were found to contain high levels of asbestos, which had been built into the fabric of the building, under the regulations in force at that time. A request by Kirklees Council for money from central Government to assist with the predicted £1 million cost of removing the asbestos was rejected in February 1991.

Expecting to take approximately 6 months to complete the task of removing the asbestos, Kirklees Council temporarily re-housed the tenants in other areas, the majority of whom consisted of mature and elderly residents. As the 6 months dragged on into three years, the tenants were offered more permanent housing elsewhere. The two blocks were eventually refurbished at a cost in excess of £6,000,000. They were then used to house younger single people and asylum seekers from other countries. As part of the refurbishment a 'State-of-the Art' CCTV security system was installed in 2009 to cover both buildings, as well as other locations in Dewsbury and Batley..In 2026, following consultation with local resident and tenants, Kirklees decided to demolish the flats rather than refurbish them, this will de done in stages and is expected to be completed by September 2026.

== Early history ==
The oldest part of the village is Deadmanstone. Originally known as Dudmanstone, Dudmanstone House is situated above Berry Brow. In 1584 the estate was recorded as belonging to the Lockwood family:

Thomas Lockwood holdeth a messuage called Dudmanstone, now made into two; two gardens; one little croft, called Tenter Croft; two closes, called Cockshutts; two closes, called Ouroyds; one close, called Sykes; third part of one called William Croft; one little meadow, called Calf Croft; one other meadow, called the Lime Croft; four closes called the Lees, &c. One house, called the Forward House; one garden and one close to the same belonging. One house called Budge Royd. One house and one garden in the tenure of one Shaw; and one meadow to the same adjoining. One messuage, called Stirley; one garden and one croft to the same belonging.

== Sport ==
Berry Brow are represented in Association Football by Berry Brow AFC, which run a number of open age men's teams, with the first team playing in the Yorkshire Amateur Supreme Division, the home ground is the Berry Brow Recreation Ground but is known humorously as the "Bernabrow".
