= Huddersfield Cricket League =

Cricket league in Huddersfield, West Yorkshire, England

Huddersfield Premier Cricket League
- Countries: England
- Format: Limited Overs
- First edition: 1891 (Founded); 2025 (ECB Premier League)
- Tournament format: League
- Number of teams: 12 (Premier Division)
- Current champion: Hoylandswaine CC
- Most successful: Elland CC (19 titles)
- Website: https://huddersfieldcl.play-cricket.com/

The Huddersfield ECB Premier League is the premier cricket competition in Huddersfield, West Yorkshire, England.

The league has been in existence since 1891 with teams representing suburbs of Huddersfield and villages in the Huddersfield district area. There are now 41 teams in the league. Now there are teams from South Yorkshire and Saddleworth, as well as clubs that have joined the league from the now defunct Huddersfield Central Cricket League and former Central Yorkshire Cricket League.

In January 2025 the league achieved ECB Premier League status, following a three year application process, making it the 33rd ECB Accredited Premier League nationally and the fifth in Yorkshire.

A number of local players have come from the Huddersfield League to play for in the English County Championship, mainly for Yorkshire and have gone on to represent England. Other county players and international players have played club cricket in the Huddersfield League.

== Champions ==
- League Champions 1892–1911
  Year	Club
  1892	Armitage Bridge and Slaithwaite (Note: Shared.)
  1893	Armitage Bridge
  1894	Kirkheaton
  1895	Meltham Mills
  1896	Kirkheaton
  1897	Holmfirth
  1898	Meltham Mills
  1899	Holmfirth
  1900	Dalton
  1901	Huddersfield
  1902	Huddersfield
  1903	Golcar
  1904	Huddersfield
  1905	Golcar
  1906	Huddersfield
  1907	Lascelles Hall
  1908	Paddock
  1909	Linthwaite Hall
  1910	Holmfirth
  1911	Slaithwaite
- League Champions 1912–1931
  Year	Club
  1912	Slaithwaite
  1913	Huddersfield
  1914	Slaithwaite
  1915	Lockwood
  1916	Huddersfield
  1917	Linthwaite
  1918	Linthwaite
  1919	Huddersfield
  1920	Linthwaite
  1921	Friarmere
  1922	Huddersfield
  1923	Huddersfield
  1924	Paddock
  1925	Slaithwaite
  1926	Kirkheaton
  1927	Friarmere
  1928	Friarmere
  1929	Slaithwaite
  1930	Huddersfield
  1931	Huddersfield
- League Champions 1932–2051
  Year	Club
  1932	Thongsbridge
  1933	Elland
  1934	Golcar and Slaithwaite
  1935	Golcar
  1936	Elland
  1937	Paddock
  1938	Slaithwaite
  1939	Elland
  1940	Holmfirth
  1941	Elland
  1942	Elland
  1943	Hall Bower
  1944	Golcar
  1945	Elland
  1946	Elland
  1947	Elland
  1948	Lascelles Hall
  1949	Rastrick
  1950	Almondbury
  1951	Almondbury
- League Champions 1952–1971
  Year	Club
  1952	Rastrick
  1953	Broad Oak
  1954	Huddersfield
  1955	Broad Oak
  1956	Elland
  1957	Kirkburton
  1958	Huddersfield
  1959	Slaithwaite
  1960	Thongsbridge
  1961	Huddersfield
  1962	Huddersfield
  1963	Holmfirth
  1964	Paddock
  1965	Paddock
  1966	Meltham
  1967	Hall Bower
  1968	Lascelles Hall
  1969	Holmfirth
  1970	Holmfirth
  1971	Holmfirth
- League Champions 1972–1991
  Year	Club
  1972	Kirkburton
  1973	Meltham
  1974	Broad Oak
  1975	Holmfirth
  1976	Holmfirth
  1977	Holmfirth
  1978	Meltham
  1979	Elland
  1980	Holmfirth
  1981	Broad Oak
  1982	Shepley
  1983	Elland
  1984	Shepley
  1985	Elland
  1986	Elland
  1987	Elland
  1988	Lascelles Hall
  1989	Elland
  1990	Skelmanthorpe
  1991	Elland
- League Champions 1992–2011
  Year	Club
  1992	Skelmanthorpe
  1993	Lascelles Hall
  1994	Meltham
  1995	Elland
  1996	Meltham
  1997	Meltham
  1998	Meltham
  1999	Elland
  2000	Scholes
  2001	Scholes
  2002	Kirkburton
  2003	Delph & Dobcross
  2004	Elland
  2005	Honley
  2006	Honley
  2007	Honley
  2008	Honley
  2009	Scholes
  2010	Honley
  2011	Honley
- League Champions 2012–present
  Year	Club
  2012	Hoylandswaine
  2013	Shepley
  2014	Hoylandswaine
  2015	Scholes
  2016	Delph & Dobcross
  2017	Hoylandswaine
  2018	Hoylandswaine
  2019	Hoylandswaine
  2021	Hoylandswaine
  2022	Hoylandswaine
  2023	Moorlands
  2024	Moorlands
  2025	Hoylandswaine
  2026	Hoylandswaine

=== Championships won ===
- League Championship
  Wins	Club
  19	Elland
  15	Huddersfield
  12	Holmfirth
  9	Hoylandswaine
  9	Slaithwaite
  6	Honley
  6	Meltham
  5	Golcar
  5	Lascelles Hall
  5	Paddock
  4	Broad Oak
  4	Scholes
  3	Friarmere
  3	Kirkburton
  3	Kirkheaton
  3	Linthwaite
  3	Shepley
- League Championship
  Wins	Club
  2	Almondbury
  2	Armitage Bridge
  2	Delph & Dobcross
  2	Hall Bower
  2	Meltham Mills
  2	Moorlands
  2	Rastrick
  2	Skelmanthorpe
  2	Thongsbridge
  1	Dalton
  1	Linthwaite Hall
  1	Lockwood
  1	Meltham

== Performance by season from 2017 ==
Key
Gold	Champions
Blue	Left League
Red	Relegated

Premiership Division performance by season, from 2017
Club	2017	2018	2019	2021	2022	2023	2024	2025	2026
Almondbury Wesleyan			13		11	8	8	3	9
Armitage Bridge	11	6	10	9	13				12
Barkisland	14		8	8	5	5	6	11	
Broad Oak	5	4	11	7	9	7	12		
Cawthorne	8	13							
Delph & Dobcross	2	9	9	12	14		11		
Golcar	12	11	7	3	12		5	5	10
Honley	6	2	5	4	2	10	9	10	3
Hoylandswaine	1	1	1	1	1	3	3	1	1
Kirkburton	9	7	12	5	7	4	4	7	5
Mirfield Parish Cavaliers		14		14		11			11
Moorlands	4	8	2	2	8	1	1	6	6
Rastrick								2	4
Scholes	7	10	4	11	3	6	2	9	2
Shelley		12	14						
Shepley	3	3	3	10	6	9	7	8	7
Skelmanthorpe	13				10	2	10	4	8
Slaithwaite				13					
Thongsbridge	10	5	6	6	4	12		12	
References									

== Notable players ==
Many Huddersfield Cricket League players have gone on to play First-class and Test cricket.

Almondbury

- Eddie Leadbeater (1927–2011) – Yorkshire Warwickshire and England

Almondbury Wesleyans

- Gurman Randhawa - Durham

Armitage Bridge

- Schofield Haigh – Yorkshire and England
- Robert Moorhouse – Yorkshire
- Fred Moorhouse – Warwickshire

Broad Oak

- Charlie Roebuck - Yorkshire
- Steven Crook - Lancashire, Northamptonshire, Middlesex
- Gurman Randhawa - Durham
- Tony Palladino - Derbyshire

Cawthorne

- Nathan Buck - Northamptonshire

Delph & Dobcross

- Arron Lilley – Lancashire
- Kyle Hogg – Lancashire
- Michael Smethurst – Lancashire

Elland

- Richard Blakey – Yorkshire and England
- Ajmal Shahzad – Yorkshire, Lancashire, Nottinghamshire and England

Emley Clarence

- Matthew Wood – Yorkshire

Golcar

- Arnie Sidebottom – Yorkshire and England

Holmfirth

- Allan Lamb – Northamptonshire and England
- Arnie Sidebottom – Yorkshire and England
- Ryan Sidebottom – Yorkshire, Nottinghamshire and England
- Tom Craddock – Essex
- Max Morley – Durham (Max is more commonly known for winning the ITV 'Love Island' television programme in 2015)

Honley

- Arnie Sidebottom – Yorkshire and England
- Craig White – Yorkshire and England
- Matthew Wood – Yorkshire
- Steven Crook – Lancashire, Northamptonshire, Middlesex

Hoylandswaine

- Ryan Robinson – Durham
- Alex Morris – Yorkshire, Hampshire
- Zac Morris – Hampshire
- Richard Wilkinson – Yorkshire

Kirkheaton

- George Hirst – Yorkshire and England
- Wilfred Rhodes – Yorkshire and England

Lascelles Hall

- Arnie Sidebottom – Yorkshire and England
- Matthew Wood – Yorkshire

Lepton Highlanders

- Phil Mustard – Durham and England

Linthwaite

- Barrie Leadbeater – Yorkshire (umpire)
- Chris Schofield – Lancashire, Surrey and England

Meltham

- Ryan Sidebottom – Yorkshire, Nottinghamshire and England
- Neil Carter – Warwickshire

Paddock

- Chris Balderstone – Yorkshire, Leicestershire and England
- Percy Holmes – Yorkshire and England
- Willie Watson – Yorkshire, Leicestershire and England.

Primrose Hill

- Ken Taylor – Yorkshire and England

Scholes James Wharton - Yorkshire CCC

Shelley

- Matthew Friedlander – Northamptonshire, Boland
- Mohammed Azharullah – Northamptonshire

Shepley

- Darren Gough – Yorkshire, Essex and England

Skelmanthorpe

- Ronnie Irani – Lancashire, Essex and England

== Overseas professionals ==
Most of the teams have had professional players who have come from overseas. A few notable ones include:

Barkisland

- Tinashe Panyangara – Zimbabwe
- Tim Seifert - New Zealand

Broad Oak

- Vikram Rathour - India
- Amay Khurasiya - India
- Irfan Fazil - Pakistan
- Naved Anjum - Pakistan
- Mujahid Jamshed - Pakistan
- Hallam Moseley - Barbados
- Saleem Mughal - Sui Northern Gas Pipelines
- Rhys Phillips - Otago
- Henry Cooper - Northern Districts
- Vinura Dulsara - Galle

Golcar

- Atul Bedade – India
- Sonny Ramadhin (guest) – West Indies

Holmfirth

- Tony Gray – West Indies
- Andrew Hudson – South Africa

Honley

- Ian Harvey (guest) – Australia
- Brett Randell - Northern Districts, Central Stags (New Zealand), Somerset

Kirkheaton

- Andrew Hudson – South Africa

Lepton

- Sikandar Raza - Zimbabwe

Linthwaite

- Deighton Butler – West Indies
- Vikram Rathour – India

Lascelles Hall

- Garth Le Roux – South Africa

Marsden

- Atul Wassan – India
- Abdur Rehman – Pakistan

Meltham

- Dilip Doshi – India
- Madan Lal – India
- Shahid Mahmood – Pakistan

Paddock

- Mansoor Akhtar – Pakistan
- Gary Sobers (guest) – West Indies

Rastrick

- Amir Sohail Pakistan
- Asif Afridi Pakistan

Scholes

- Wasim Jaffer – India
- Peter Drysdale – Northern Districts (New Zealand)

Shelley

- Muthumudalige Pushpakumara – Sri Lanka
- Mohammad Ramzan – Pakistan

Shepley

- Trent Copeland – Australia

Slaithwaite

- Pragyan Ojha – India

== Member clubs ==
The league currently, as of 2024, is split into 7 sections, where club's first and second teams play.

Elland has won the most 1st XI competitions, leagues and various cups, with 42 trophies in the history of the league. Broad Oak with 32 trophies have had most success in 2nd XI competitions.

Here are the clubs playing in the league during the 2024 season (they are linked to the locality where they are based):

- Almondbury
- Almondbury Wesleyans
- Armitage Bridge
- Barkisland
- Birkby Rose Hill
- Broad Oak
- Cartworth Moor
- Clayton West
- Cumberworth United
- Delph & Dobcross
- Denby
- Denby Dale
- Denby Grange
- Edgerton & Dalton
- Emley Clarence
- Flockton
- Golcar
- Hall Bower
- Holmbridge
- Holmfirth
- Honley
- Hoylandswaine
- Kirkheaton
- Kirkburton
- Lascelles Hall
- Linthwaite
- Marsden
- Meltham
- Mirfield
- Mirfield Parish Cavaliers
- Moorlands CC
- Rastrick
- Scholes
- Shelley
- Shepley
- Skelmanthorpe
- Slaithwaite
- Thongsbridge
- Thurstonland
- Upperthong

=== Former clubs ===
- Bradey Mills
- Cawthorne
- Elland
- Friarmere
- Halifax
- Huddersfield
- Kexborough
- Lepton
- Linthwaite Hall
- Lockwood
- Meltham Mills
- Micklehurst
- Paddock
- Primrose Hill
