= Skelmanthorpe =

Village in West Yorkshire, England

Coordinates: 53.591°N 1.649°W

Skelmanthorpe: Shat
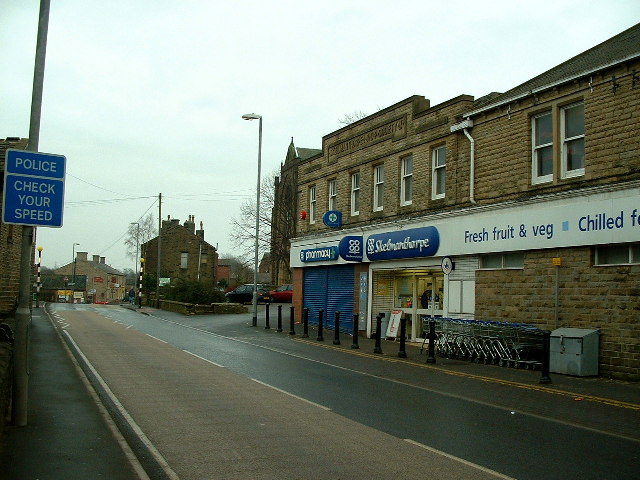
- Commercial Road

- Location within West Yorkshire
- Population: 4,549 (2011 census)
- OS grid reference: SE233105
- Civil parish: Denby Dale
- Metropolitan borough: Kirklees
- Metropolitan county: West Yorkshire
- Region: Yorkshire and the Humber
- Country: England
- Sovereign state: United Kingdom
- Post town: HUDDERSFIELD
- Postcode district: HD8
- Police: West Yorkshire
- Fire: West Yorkshire
- Ambulance: Yorkshire
- UK Parliament: Ossett and Denby Dale

Skelmanthorpe, known locally as Shat, is a village in the Denby Dale civil parish, in the metropolitan borough of Kirklees, in West Yorkshire, England. It is 9 miles (14 km) from both Huddersfield and Barnsley. According to the 2011 census, the village had a population of 4,549.

The village sits on the south (right) bank of the first river-like flow, from three small headwaters (uniting in the northwest corner of the parish), of the Dearne.

== Name ==
The village was recorded as Scelmertorp in the Domesday Book in the year 1086 AD. The name derives from the Norse personal name Skjaldmarr and thorp; thus having the meaning of an "outlying farmstead of a man called Skjaldmarr".

Locals know it as "Shat", which appears to be an abbreviation of "Shatterers", the name by which the locals are known. Local labour was taken on during construction of the railway to break or 'shatter' rocks as well as work on the excavations. These unskilled labourers were referred to as Shatterers. Doctor Who star Jodie Whittaker, who is from Skelmanthorpe, has explained the origins of the term and referred to herself as a "Shat lass".

== History ==
The village was probably founded during the Viking invasion in the 9th century, as they moved inland from the North Sea.

The entry for Skelmanthorpe in the Domesday Book of 1086 states:

Manors & Berewick. In Turulsetone and Berceworde and Scelmertorp, Alric and Aldene had nine carcucates of land to be taxed, and there may be five ploughs there. Ilbert now has it, and it is waste. Value in King Edwards time 4 pounds. Wood pasture one mile long and as much broad.

The comment "and it is waste." is the result of the Harrying of the North of 1069. William the Conqueror had difficulties subduing his northern subjects, leading to the order to "spare neither man nor beast, but to kill, burn and destroy" being issued. This left Skelmanthorpe and much of Yorkshire a wasteland for about nine years.

The first recorded owners of the village were Alric and Aldena in the 11th century, mentioned in the Domesday Book of 1086. Following the Norman invasion of England in 1066 the village was given to Ilbert de Laci by the new king. The de Laci family owned the village for the next 300 years, until through the marriage of Alice de Laci in the 14th century, the village came into the possession of Thomas, Earl of Lancaster. The village remained in this family and after the marriage of Blanche of Lancaster to John of Gaunt, the village became the property of their son Henry (King of England).

During the 1770s, Skelmanthorpe Feast was a riotous affair with bull and bear-baiting and organised dog fights on the village green. A quote from John Taylor, who compiled a biography of Skelmanthorpe-born preacher Isaac Marsden (1807–1882), records that "Public houses were crowded with drunken revellers, who caroused all day and made night hideous with quarrels and disturbances ... Among these scenes of revelry were mountebanks, showmen, fortune telling Gypsies, vagabonds and thieves from every quarter." Skelmanthorpe Feast now happens every year on the field next to The Chartist and across the road from what was the Three Horse Shoes public house and is now shops.

In November 1874 a number of skirmishes were fought between the native villagers and Irish navvies. The navvies had been brought in to construct the railway, and fighting broke out between them and the locals on a number of occasions and locals being refused work on the line. A small group of locals threw stones at the navvies, who responded with mattock shafts and spades. The fighting lasted for most of the day eventually ending in the afternoon. Police were called in from Huddersfield but arrived after the disturbances had finished.

In 1934 a cinema was built, it was the sole use of the building for almost 30 years. In 1961 wrestling was introduced to increase revenue. A reduction in audiences in 1968 resulted in the cinema closing and the building became a bingo hall until 1970 when the building closed. After five years it reopened as the Savoy Squash Club. In June 2010, part of the club was redeveloped as a Youth and Community Centre with a car park, outdoor 5-a-side court, sports hall with a stage, meeting room and cafe.

=== Industry ===
Similar to many village in the area, agriculture was the primary industry of Skelmanthorpe until the 19th century when weaving took over as the dominant occupation. Many older buildings in the village show signs of having been used as weavers cottages in the past. As late as 1890, there were 200 hand looms in cottages in Skelmanthorpe.

Number 6, Queen Street was preserved by Leslie Robinson a local historian as the Skelmanthorpe Textile Heritage Centre, complete with hand loom and all the associated equipment. He became frail and in 2011 the Friends of Skelmanthorpe Textile Heritage Centre was created to assist with the running of the centre. Following Robinson's death in 2015 The Friends applied to the Heritage Lottery Fund to purchase the centre from his estate. The centre is now owned by a charitable trust. It opens on the second Sunday of the months between March and December to give free guided tours and loom demonstrations. It also opens for four days in September during the English Heritage Open Days.

=== Survey of English Dialects ===
Skelmanthorpe was a site in the Survey of English Dialects. The recording taken were notable because of the rich form of dialect used and because it discussed a local sighting of a ghost that stood out in the survey, in which most recordings were of villagers discussing local industries.

== Governance ==
Skelmanthorpe was in the Staincross Wapentake, part of the West Riding of Yorkshire, and split betwixt the ancient parishes of High Hoyland and Silkstone. Skelmanthorpe became a civil parish in 1876, on 1 April 1974 the parish was abolished and merged into Denby Dale. In 1951 the parish had a population of 3425.

== Buildings and services ==
=== Schools ===
Two schools are in Skelmanthorpe:

- St Aidan's Church of England Academy
- Skelmanthorpe Academy

Both of these are First schools, serving children up to Year 5 (rather than Year 6 like most primary schools).

After the first school, children move on to Middle School (usually Scissett Middle School) for 3 years before moving on to Shelley College.

=== Churches ===
Skelmanthorpe has five churches:

- Church of St Aidan – (Church of England – Anglican)
- Skelmanthorpe Methodist Church
- Trinity Evangelical Church
- Skelmanthorpe Wesleyan Reform Church (now closed and demolished)
- Saville Road Hall (Christian – non-denominational)

=== Fire station ===
The fire station was constructed in 1956. It currently houses one pump and one area support unit along with 21 personnel and is designated as a retained fire station.

== Sports teams and facilities ==
The village has had its own cricket team since around 1876; the current cricket pitch dates from 1900.

The village also has its own junior and senior football teams that play in the Huddersfield leagues respectively.

There are two crown green bowls clubs within the village. One club is based at the Windmill Pub on the outskirts of the village and the other club based in the centre of the village. Each club have their own bowling green.

Following a petition from local young people fundraising allowed the construction of a small skatepark which opened early 2006. Residents from the area complained about the noise and the skatepark has since been moved. It is now at the bottom of the football field.

Parkgate Sports and Community Trust have won the right for a new sports complex to be built at Parkgate.

== Transport ==
=== Railway ===
For more than 100 years (from 1879 until 1986), Skelmanthorpe had a railway station on the Clayton West branch line that ran along the northern edge of the village. The line was closed to passengers in 1983 and the track was removed in 1986.

The disused trackbed of the former branch line was later used for the Kirklees Light Railway, a minimum-gauge railway designed as a tourist attraction, which opened as far as Skelmanthorpe in 1992.

The nearest railway stations now are Denby Dale (2.2 miles) and Shepley (3.1 miles); both stations are on the Penistone Line with trains in both directions to Huddersfield, Barnsley and Sheffield.

=== Buses ===
Skelmanthorpe is served by bus services to Holmfirth and Wakefield on the X1 service and Huddersfield and Denby Dale on the D1 Denby Darts service. Team Pennine is the bus company that runs these services through the village.

=== Roads ===
The main road through the village is the B6116, which connects to the A629 and A636.

== Notable groups and residents ==
=== Male voice choir and brass band ===
Skelmanthorpe Male Voice Choir began in 1934:

1. To maintain and increase the love of and the interest in music in the village.
2. To help charitable institutions.
3. To increase the fame and renown of the village by winning competitions.

Since 2009 its director is Jane Hobson.

Formed in 1843, the Skelmanthorpe Brass Band is among the oldest ten of such bands in Britain. They rank in the First Section of The National Brass Band Championships.

=== Residents and ex-residents ===
Actresses:

- Jodie Whittaker. She has appeared in films including Venus and St Trinian's and portrayed the Thirteenth Doctor in the television series Doctor Who. She mentioned she was a "Shat lass" on Graham Norton's chat show.

Musicians:

- Biff Byford, the lead singer of heavy-metal band Saxon.

== Setting for film or television ==
During the mid-1970s, central parts were a set for Yorkshire Television sitcom, Oh No, It's Selwyn Froggitt!, starring Bill Maynard.

== Nearby places ==
Towns and cities: Barnsley, Huddersfield, Wakefield

Villages: Denby Dale, Clayton West, Emley, Lower Cumberworth, Scissett, Shelley, Shepley

== See also ==
- Listed buildings in Denby Dale
