= Scissett =

Village in West Yorkshire, England

Coordinates: 53.587802°N 1.626834°W

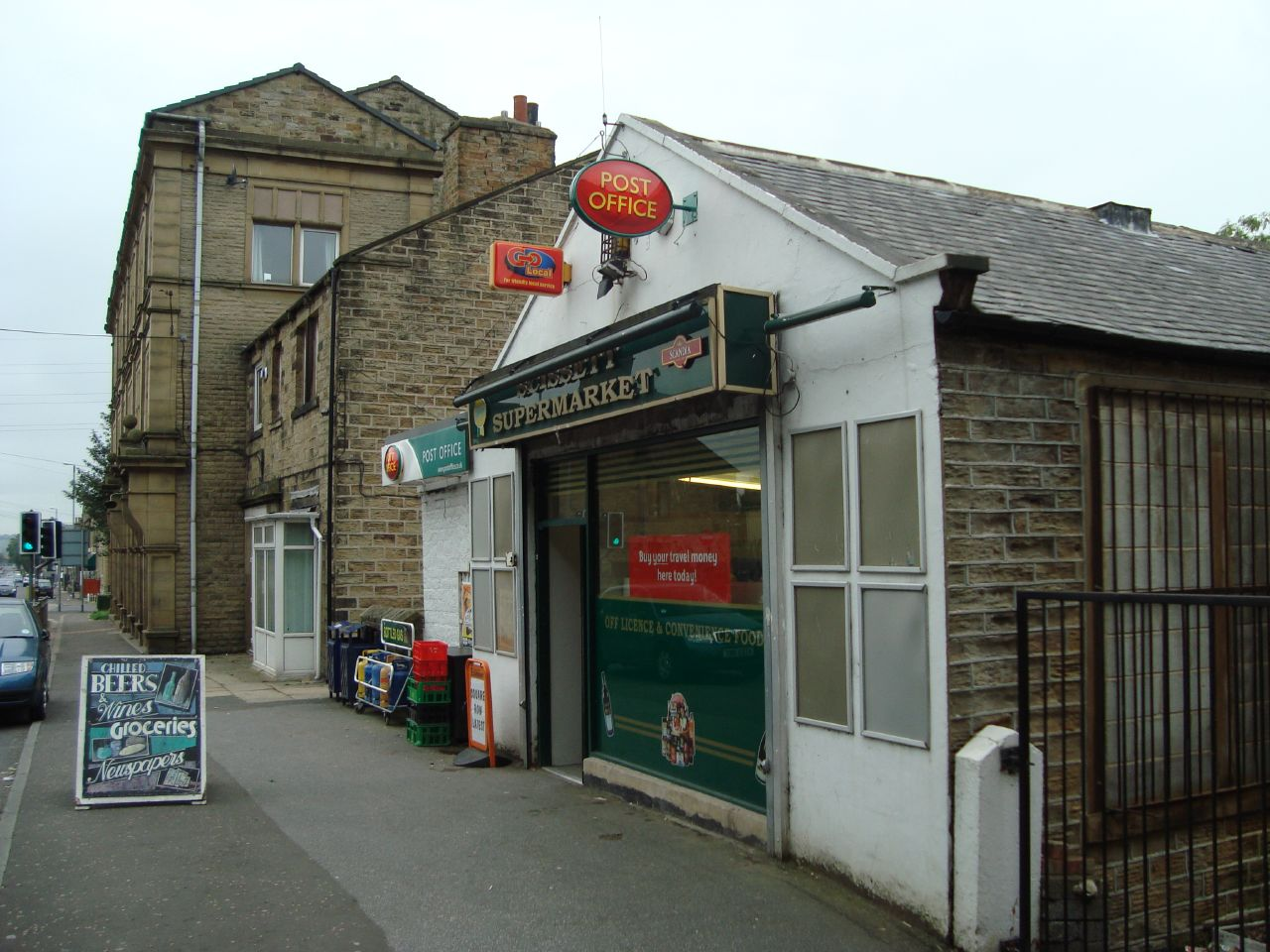
- Post office

- Location within West Yorkshire
- Population: 1,324
- OS grid reference: SE242130
- Metropolitan borough: Kirklees
- Metropolitan county: West Yorkshire
- Region: Yorkshire and the Humber
- Country: England
- Sovereign state: United Kingdom
- Post town: HUDDERSFIELD
- Postcode district: HD8
- Dialling code: 01484
- Police: West Yorkshire
- Fire: West Yorkshire
- Ambulance: Yorkshire

Scissett is a village in West Yorkshire, England. It is 10 miles (16 km) south-east of Huddersfield and 8 miles (13 km) north-west of Barnsley. According to the 2001 census, the village had a population of 1,324. Scissett is halfway between the villages of Clayton West, Skelmanthorpe and Denby Dale on the A636 road to Wakefield.

River Dearne runs through the village, which was affected by the 2007 United Kingdom floods.

Scissett was originally in the Parish of High Hoyland, and the Wapentake of Staincross which more or less corresponds with the current Barnsley borough area.

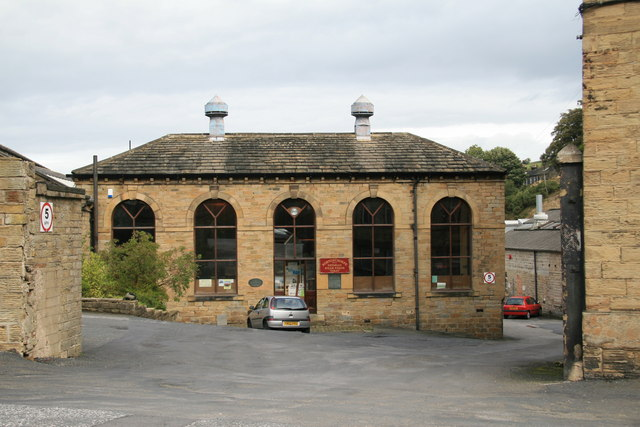
Northonthorpe Mills, formerly premises of woollen manufacturers

Scissett grew up around the woollen industry in the 19th century as mill owners built houses in the area for their workers. The nearby coalfields also provided employment. These industries are now gone and some of the mills are now retail units.

The Scissett Baths (and leisure centre) is one of the main attractions for the surrounding area.

Scissett has first and middle schools to provide education for children ages 4 to 13.

Scissett Youth Band was founded in the village in 1978 but moved to Shelley Methodist Hall in 1991.

== Sport ==
Scissett is home to Nortonthorpe Sports Club (NSC) based at the top of Springfield Avenue. NSC has been in existence for 75 years, since 1949, and has been a registered charity since 1978. Its primary purpose is to provide recreational facilities for the benefit of the people of Scissett and surrounding areas and is overseen by a number of trustees.

== Etymology ==
The etymology is doubtful, although some sources suggest it may be from Old English side "hillside, talus, slope" (related to Old Norse siða, of similar meaning), but nothing is confirmed. The first element is uncertain. However, another source claims a completely different etymology, that it was named after "Scissett Wood", itself named after a woman.

== Notable people ==
- Dr Colin Booth (1924 in Scissett - 2003), a mycologist and a leading authority on fusaria, educated at the village school.
- Daniel Kitson (born 1977), an English comedian, actor, performer and writer, he attended Scissett Middle School
- Jodie Whittaker (born 1982), an English actress, she attended Scissett Middle School

== See also ==
- Listed buildings in Denby Dale
