= Lower Denby =

Village in West Yorkshire, England

Coordinates: 53.567°N 1.642°W

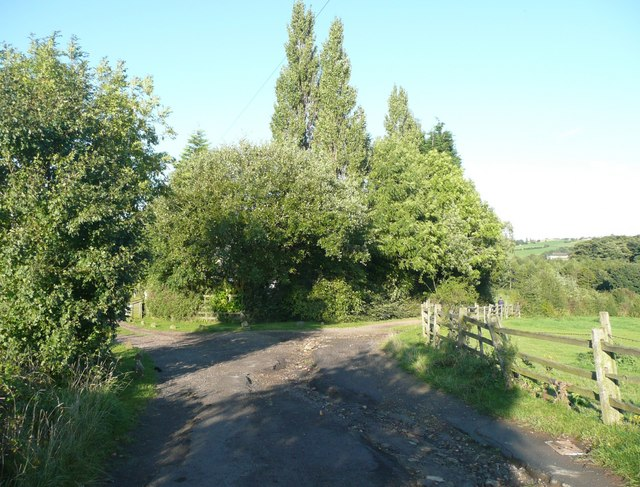
- Denby Lane, Lower Demby

- Location within West Yorkshire
- OS grid reference: SE238079
- Civil parish: Denby Dale
- Metropolitan borough: Kirklees
- Metropolitan county: West Yorkshire
- Region: Yorkshire and the Humber
- Country: England
- Sovereign state: United Kingdom
- Post town: Huddersfield
- Postcode district: HD8
- Dialling code: 01484
- Police: West Yorkshire
- Fire: West Yorkshire
- Ambulance: Yorkshire
- UK Parliament: Ossett and Denby Dale

Lower Denby is a small village within the civil parish of Denby Dale, and the borough of Kirklees in West Yorkshire, England.

== Location ==
Lying 5 miles north-west of Barnsley and 12 miles to the south-east of Huddersfield and 2 miles south of Denby Dale, on an east facing slope of the Pennines, it occupies a position 820 feet (250 m) above sea level.

The southern edge of the village is bordered by the Metropolitan borough of Barnsley within the county of South Yorkshire.

== Name ==
The name Denby derives from the Old English Dene meaning 'the Danes', and the Old Norse bȳ meaning 'village'.

== See also ==
- Listed buildings in Denby Dale
