= Boshaw Whams Reservoir =

Reservoir in Yorkshire, England

Boshaw Whams
- Bowshaw Whams
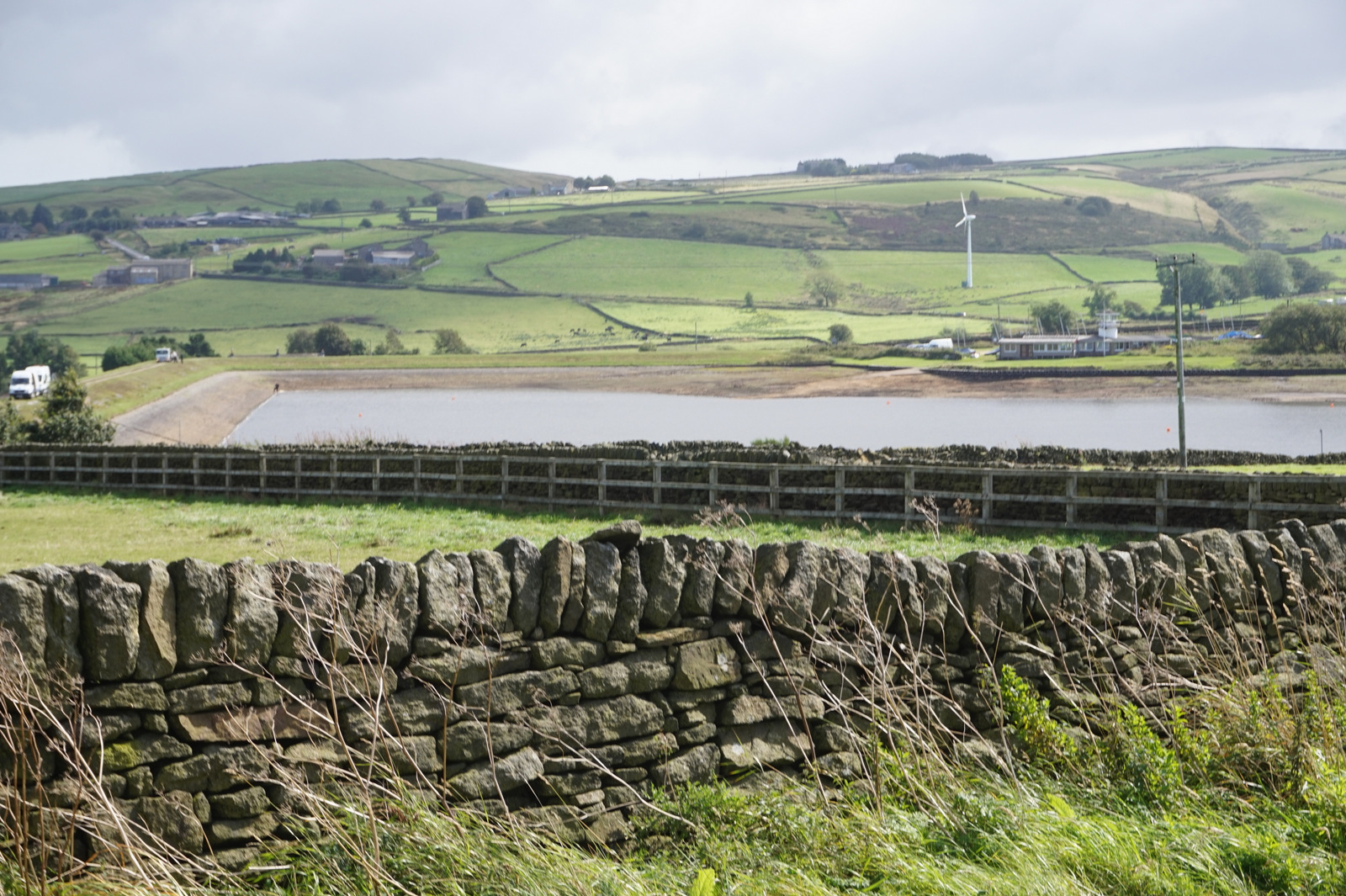

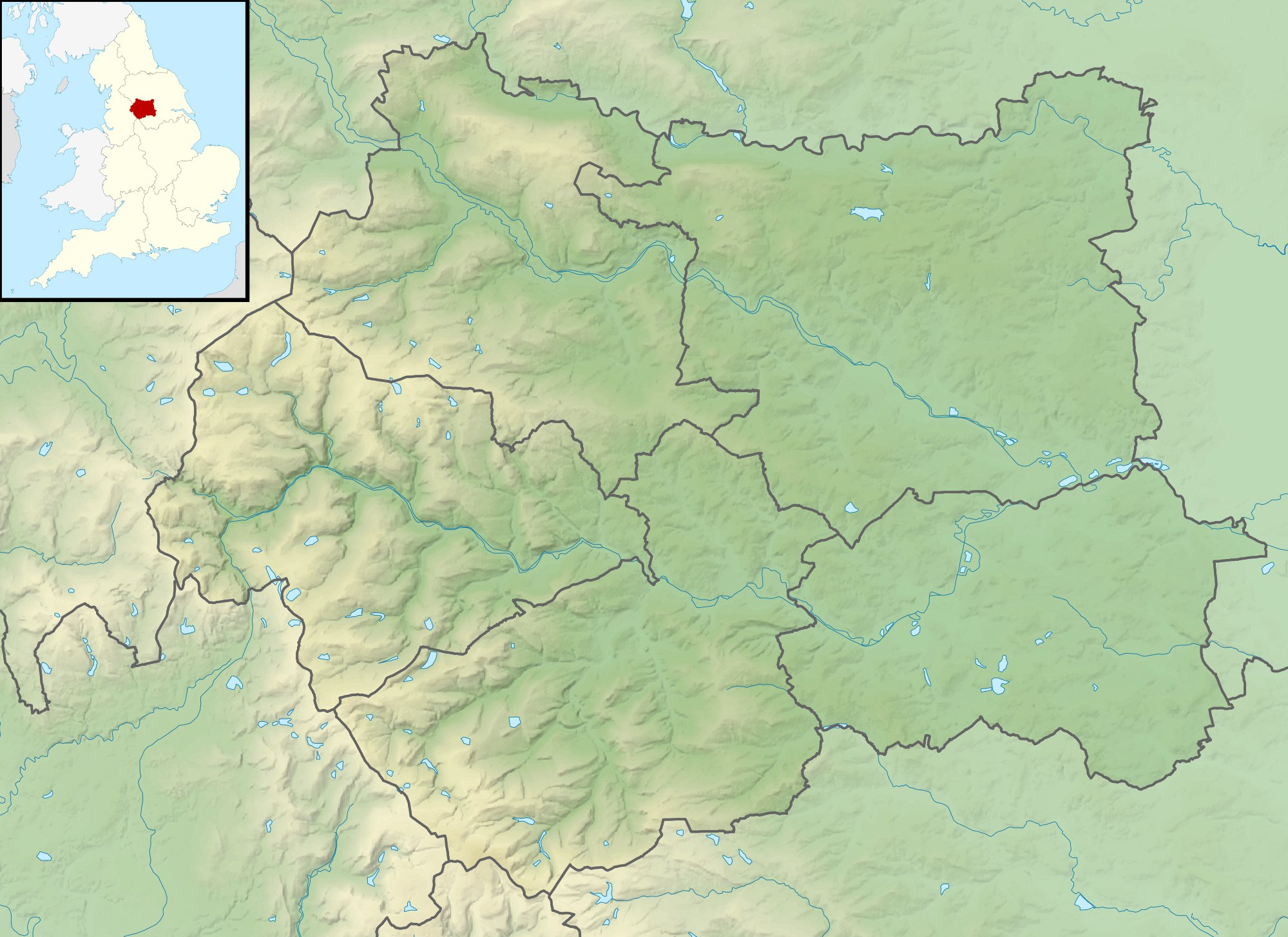
- Location within West Yorkshire
- Location: Hade Edge, West Yorkshire, England
- Coordinates: 53.547°N 1.773°W
- Etymology: Old English sceaga (shaw); Old Norse hvammr (wham)
- Primary outflows: Dean Dike
- Catchment area: 53 hectares (130 acres)
- Built: 1840
- Surface area: 5 hectares (12 acres)
- Average depth: 3.3 metres (11 ft)
- Water volume: 153,940 cubic metres (5,436,000 cu ft)
- Surface elevation: 300 metres (980 ft)

Boshaw Whams Reservoir is an upland waterbody near to the village of Hade Edge, in West Yorkshire, England. The site was originally built in 1840 to keep a supply of water for mill-owners downstream, but is now owned by Yorkshire Water but still used as a compensation reservoir for river water levels. It is used recreationally by a sailing club and for fishing. It is the only known site in Yorkshire where the invasive narrow-clawed crayfish is present.

== History ==
An act of Parliament was obtained in June 1837 titled Holme Reservoirs Act 1837 (7 Will. 4 & 1 Vict. c. liv) which permitted the building of three reservoirs; Bilberry-Mill, Holme-Styes and Boshaw Whams. The reservoir was built in 1840 to provide water for mills further down the valley. It transferred to the ownership of the Huddersfield Corporation via the Huddersfield Corporation Act 1937 (1 Edw. 8 & 1 Geo. 6. c. lxix). The reservoir is now owned by Yorkshire Water, which was consolidated from several local water corporations in 1973. During the 1995 drought in the Yorkshire region, Yorkshire Water were importing water into the area via a fleet of tankers, but the water from Boshaw Whams could not be used to supply drinking water as it was not connected to the rest of the Yorkshire Water network. It was used to compensate water flow in the local river system, however, in November 1995, an emergency drought order meant that water was taken from Boshaw Whams as it was 85% full, compared to other reservoirs which were only 13% full.

The reservoir covers an area of 5 hectares (12 acres) at an altitude of 300 metres (980 ft), with a catchment area of 53 hectares (130 acres). Boshaw Whams has an average depth of 3.3 metres (11 ft) and holds 153,940 cubic metres (5,436,000 cu ft) of water. The reservoir dams the New Mill Dyke, and the outflow is through Dean Dike, through which it now acts as a compensation reservoir for the River Holme system.

The reservoir was inspected in 1852 after the floods in Holmfirth caused by the embankment of the Bilberry Reservoir collapsing in February of that year. The water exiting both the Holme-Styes and Boshaw Whams reservoirs feeds into watercourses through Holmfirth, and the authorities were keen to avoid a repetition of the floods from Bilberry Reservoir. The engineer declared that although the banks and dam head of Boshaw Whams were structurally sound, the "waste weir was much dilapidated and requires immediate repair..."

The name of the reservoir derives from a combination of the Old English sceaga (shaw), meaning a copse, thicket or small wood, and the Old Norse hvammr (wham), meaning a swamp, a marshy hollow, or a dale among the hills.

=== Rainfall ===
Boshaw Whams reservoir rainfall data 1968 - 1991

Rainfall at Boshaw Whams – yearly average, 1968 to 1991
Year	Rainfall (Note: 1968 – 1980 at SE153057 283 metres (928 ft) 1981 – 1984 at SE154058 283 metres (928 ft) 1985 – 1991 at SE153058 263 metres (863 ft))	Ref	Year	Rainfall	Ref
1968	1,415 millimetres (55.7 in)		1980	1,416 millimetres (55.7 in)	
1969	1,040 millimetres (41 in)		1981	1,443 millimetres (56.8 in)	
1970	1,171 millimetres (46.1 in)		1982	1,231 millimetres (48.5 in)	
1971	1,021 millimetres (40.2 in)		1983	1,319 millimetres (51.9 in)	
1972	1,166 millimetres (45.9 in)		1984	1,168 millimetres (46.0 in)	
1973	1,013 millimetres (39.9 in)		1985	956 millimetres (37.6 in)	
1974	1,310 millimetres (52 in)		1986	1,540 millimetres (61 in)	
1975	881 millimetres (34.7 in)		1987	1,117 millimetres (44.0 in)	
1976	985 millimetres (38.8 in)		1988	1,289 millimetres (50.7 in)	
1977	1,418 millimetres (55.8 in)		1989	1,081 millimetres (42.6 in)	
1978	1,037 millimetres (40.8 in)		1990	1,233 millimetres (48.5 in)	
1979	1,347 millimetres (53.0 in)		1991	968 millimetres (38.1 in)	

== Recreation ==
The reservoir is used by Huddersfield Sailing Club since 1958, and the site is also used for fishing. The sailing club's race control tower, which overlooks the reservoir is part of the original Emley Moor transmitter which collapsed in 1969.

In 2019, the anglers who use the reservoir reported the existence of narrow-clawed crayfish, an invasive species; the crayfish at Boshaw Whams appear to be the only site in Yorkshire where the invasive species exist. Downstream of the reservoir is a known site for white-clawed crayfish, which could be at risk when scour tests, conducted twice a year, release water into Dale Dike which runs downstream to the site at Armitage Bridge which is where the white-clawed crayfish are. Other non-native species found at the reservoir include Curley and Canadian pondweed.
