= Upper Denby =

Village in West Yorkshire, England

Coordinates: 53.560°N 1.655°W

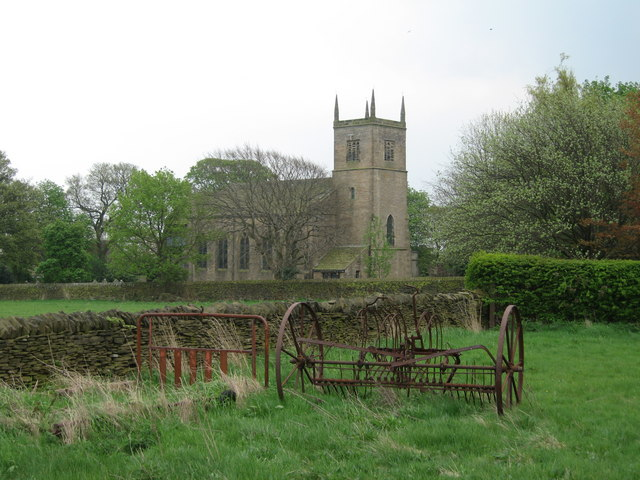
- Upper Denby Church

- Location within West Yorkshire
- Population: 715 (2011 census)
- OS grid reference: SE229073
- Metropolitan borough: Kirklees
- Metropolitan county: West Yorkshire
- Region: Yorkshire and the Humber
- Country: England
- Sovereign state: United Kingdom
- Post town: Huddersfield
- Postcode district: HD8
- Dialling code: 01484
- Police: West Yorkshire
- Fire: West Yorkshire
- Ambulance: Yorkshire
- UK Parliament: Ossett and Denby Dale

Upper Denby is a small village within the civil parish of Denby Dale, and the borough of Kirklees in West Yorkshire, England.

Lying 7 miles north-west of Barnsley and 11 miles to the south-east of Huddersfield and 2 miles south of Denby Dale, on an east facing slope of the Pennines, it occupies a position 820 feet (250 m) above sea level.

The southern edge of the village is bordered by the Metropolitan borough of Barnsley within the county of South Yorkshire.

The name Denby derives from the Old English Dene meaning 'the Danes', and the Old Norse bȳ meaning 'village'.

== The village ==
It has a pub (The George Inn), a dentist, a church (St John the Evangelist) and cricket ground. (The Denby Cricket Club are in the Huddersfield Cricket League)

Upper Denby is home to Denby C of E first school.

In the 2001 census the population was given as 719 and included the settlement of High Flatts. By the 2011 census, this had dropped to a population of 715.

== See also ==
- Listed buildings in Denby Dale
