= Durkar =

Village in West Yorkshire, England

Coordinates: 53.649°N 1.528°W

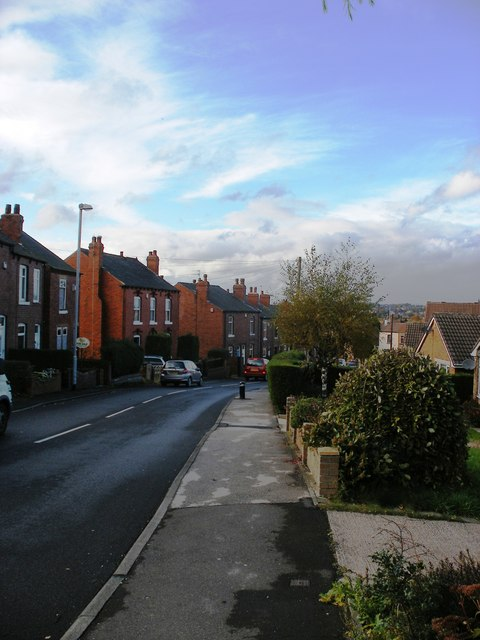
Hollin Lane

Durkar is a small village in the southwestern suburbs of the City of Wakefield, West Yorkshire, England.

The name 'Durkar' derives from the Norse drit kjarr meaning 'dirt marsh'.

Durkar is bordered by the parishes of Crigglestone to the south-west and Kettlethorpe to the east. It is under the local administration of Crigglestone Parish Council with authoritative powers exercised by Wakefield Metropolitan District Council.

The village lies on the main arterial road into Wakefield, the A636, and adjacent to Junction 39 of the M1 motorway. The city of Leeds is 10 miles (16 km) to the north; Sheffield 19 miles (31 km) to the south; and Manchester 30 miles (48 km) to the south-west.

Nearest schools are Kettlethorpe High School and St James CE Junior.

Local landmarks include Sandal Castle, a 10th-century stronghold, Kenton Drive, West Bretton Sculpture Park and Pugneys Country Park. The local public house is the New Inn.

There is also a junior football club called Durkar Devils FC, named after the village. Durkar is located near Crigglestone, the village of St James Primary Academy, Chapelthorpe and Kettlethorpe.
