= Listed buildings in Denby Dale =

Denby Dale is a civil parish in the metropolitan borough of Kirklees, West Yorkshire, England. It contains 82 listed buildings that are recorded in the National Heritage List for England. Of these, one is listed at Grade I, the highest of the three grades, three are at Grade II*, the middle grade, and the others are at Grade II, the lowest grade. The parish contains the villages of Denby Dale, Clayton West, Lower Cumberworth, Upper Cumberworth, Lower Denby, Upper Denby, Emley, Scissett, and Skelmanthorpe, and is otherwise rural. Most of the listed buildings are houses and cottages, farmhouses and farm buildings, and churches and chapels with associated structures. The other listed buildings include the base of a market cross, bridges, including a packhorse bridge, mill buildings, a milestone and mileposts, a set of stocks, a railway viaduct, and a television transmitting mast.

== Key ==
Grade	Criteria
I	Buildings of exceptional interest, sometimes considered to be internationally important
II*	Particularly important buildings of more than special interest
II	Buildings of national importance and special interest

== Buildings ==
Name and location	Photograph	Date	Notes	Grade
St Michael's Church, Emley; 53.61592°N 1.63123°W		Early medieval (probable)	The oldest part of the church is the south wall, most of the church dates from the 15th century, a chapel was added in 1632, and the church was restored in 1874. It is built in stone with a stone slate roof, and consists of a nave, a lean-to north aisle, a south porch, a chancel with a north chapel, and a large west tower. The tower has two stages, diagonal buttresses, a west door with a moulded surround and a hood mould, a three-light west window, a clock face on the south, gargoyles, and an embattled parapet with eight crocketed pinnacles.	I
Cross base, Upper Cumberworth; 53.57550°N 1.68250°W	—	Medieval	The cross base is in the churchyard of St Nicholas' Church, Upper Cumberworth. It consists of a square stone base with spurs. On the base is an 18th or 19th-century boundary marker consisting of a square stone shaft, tooled on three sides, with a moulded base and a small moulded cap.	II
Market cross, Emley; 53.61365°N 1.63345°W		Medieval	The market cross is in stone, and consists of a short circular post in a square base on a square step, and it is painted white.	II
Wheatley Hill Farmhouse; 53.58368°N 1.62042°W		16th century (probable)	The oldest part is the west wing, and the rest of the farmhouse is dated 1651. It is in stone with quoins, and the west wing is rendered with exposed timber framing. The roof is in stone slate, and has chamfered gable copings and moulded kneelers on the east wing. There are two storeys and a U-shaped plan, the open part containing an outshut. Some of the windows are double chamfered with mullions and hood moulds.	II*
Cruck barn, Nether End Farm; 53.56684°N 1.62924°W	—	16th or early 17th century	The barn is cruck framed, and was encased in stone in 1663. It has a stone slate roof and four bays. The barn contains a square-headed cart entry, windows, triangular vents, and a dated lintel. Inside, there are four complete cruck trusses.	II*
Kirkby Grange Hall; 53.62400°N 1.63061°W	—	c. 1606	A large house, later extended and divided, it is in stone with quoins and a stone slate roof. There are two storeys and an attic, and a U-shaped plan, with two main three-bay ranges at right angles, and two rear wings. The main doorway has a lintel with scrolls, shields and an inscription. The windows are double chamfered, and mullioned and transomed, and have continuous hood moulds.	II
Thorncliffe Grange Farmhouse; 53.61696°N 1.62340°W	—	Soon after 1623	A large house in stone on a plinth, with quoins, and a stone slate roof with coped gables, kneelers, and finials. There are two storeys and a U-shaped plan with three gabled bays. In the front is a single-storey gabled porch with an arched lintel, a sundial in the apex, and a chamfered inner doorway. The windows are double-chamfered with mullions and transoms, and there is a continuous hood mould over the ground floor openings.	II*
Barn north of Kirby Grange Hall; 53.62442°N 1.63064°W	—	Early 17th century	The barn is in stone with quoins, and a stone slate roof with a partly coped west gable. There are four bays and a single aisle on the north. The barn contains double and single doorways, windows, a hayloft door, and vents.	II
St John's Church, Upper Denby; 53.56065°N 1.65985°W		1627	The oldest part of the church is the tower, the body of the church being rebuilt in 1842–43, and the chancel and interior remodelled in 1900–01. The church is built in stone with a stone slate roof, and consists of a nave, a chancel with a south vestry, and a west tower with a porch to the south. The tower has three stage, diagonal buttresses, a blind oculus in the middle stage on the south, and a parapet with pointed octagonal pinnacles. The nave windows have Y-tracery and the east window has six lights.	II
Barn west of Lower Busker Farmhouse; 53.58937°N 1.62918°W	—	1633	A stone barn with quoins and a stone slate roof. It has a main range, an outshut and a later addition to the right, and an outshut to the rear on the left. The barn contains a square-headed cart entry with a dated quoin stone, windows and doorways. There is a continuous hood mould over the ground floor openings.	II
5 Commercial Road, Skelmanthorpe; 53.59175°N 1.65202°W		1642	A stone house with quoins and a stone slate roof with chamfered coping on the left gable. Thee are two storeys, two bays and a continuous rear outshut. The doorway has square jambs and a large initialled and dated lintel. The windows are chamfered and mullioned, some mullions have been removed, and above the ground floor openings is a continuous hood mould.	II
12 and 14 Queen Street, Skelmanthorpe; 53.59199°N 1.64797°W	—	17th century	A stone house divided into two on a plinth, with quoins, a stone slate roof, and two storeys. The doorway to the right has a chamfered surround and a deep lintel, and the doorway to the left dates from the 19th century. Most of the windows are mullioned, and there is a hood mould over the ground floor openings.	II
Bilham Grange Farmhouse; 53.59343°N 1.60184°W	—	17th century	The farmhouse is rendered, and has a stone slate roof with chamfered copings and a finial to the main gable. There are two parallel ranges, the rear range smaller, with two storeys, and the main range also has an attic. The windows are double chamfered and mullioned. To the right of the main entrance is a carved shield.	II
Manor Farm Jubilee Youth Centre; 53.59158°N 1.64875°W	—	17th century or earlier	A cruck-framed farm building with a barn added in the 18th century, and later used for other purposes. The building is in stone with a slate roof, and it contains a partly blocked square-headed cart entry, an elliptical-arched cart entry, and a doorway with an inscribed lintel. Inside the earlier part are two cruck trusses.	II
Manor House Farmhouse; 53.56732°N 1.63098°W	—	17th century	The farmhouse is in rendered stone and has a stone slate roof. There are two storeys and an L-shaped plan, with a front range of two bays and a rear wing. In the centre is a doorway, the windows are mullioned, and over the ground floor openings is a continuous hood mould. In the rear wing is an outshut containing a stone seat.	II
Main barn, Moor Head Farm; 53.61141°N 1.66116°W	—	17th century or earlier	The barn is L-shaped, with a timber framed core, and has been encased in stone. It has a stone slate roof, hipped at the angle. There is a large recent opening, a smaller doorway, and a blocked cart entry.	II
Nether End Farmhouse; 53.56665°N 1.62921°W	—	17th century	The farmhouse was refronted and altered in the 18th century. It is in stone with quoins, and a stone slate roof with coped gables and moulded kneelers. There are two storeys, a gabled wing on the left, a recessed extension on the right with a front of four bays, and a rear outshut. The main doorway has a moulded surround and an arched head. The windows in the older part are double chamfered and mullioned. In the extension are casement windows and an entrance with a canopy on brackets.	II
Farmhouse, Nether End Nurseries; 53.56683°N 1.62795°W	—	17th century	The farmhouse, which incorporates earlier material, is in stone, partly rendered, with quoins, and a stone slate roof. There are two storeys, a main range of three bays, a single-storey outshut at the rear, and a projecting single-bay wing on the right. Some of the windows have retained their timber mullions.	II
Barn, Tenter House Farm; 53.56840°N 1.64204°W	—	17th century	The barn has a timber framed core, with walls in stone, replaced later on the south side, quoins, and a stone slate roof. There are four bays, and the barn contains opposing square-headed cart entries and a doorway.	II
Former farmhouse, Tenter House Farm; 53.56846°N 1.64171°W	—	17th century	The farmhouse is in stone with quoins, and a stone slate roof with coped gables and kneelers. There are two storeys, and it consists of a main range, a two-storey wing to the right, and a single storey recessed wing to the left. The main range has a chamfered doorway, and in the left wing is an arched doorway with a moulded surround. The windows are double-chamfered and mullioned.	II
Upper Bagden Farmhouse; 53.57637°N 1.62347°W	—	17th century	A stone farmhouse with quoins, and a stone slate roof with chamfered coping on the gables and moulded kneelers. There are two storeys, a main range, a cross-wing, and the rear extended as an outshut resulting in an L-shaped plan. The front has been largely rebuilt, and at the rear is timber framing. In the cross-wing the windows are double-chamfered with mullions and hood moulds, and in the front apex is a dovecote.	II
Main range, White Cross Farm; 53.61107°N 1.61280°W	—	17th century or earlier	The oldest of the farm buildings is the main barn, which has a timber framed core, and was encased in stone when the other buildings were added, probably in 1757. It has a stone slate roof, quoins, a square-headed cart entry with a datestone, and later doorways. Recessed on the left is an extension containing pig sties, and an external stairway.	II
Withywood Hall; 53.58071°N 1.66355°W	—	17th century	The house is in rendered stone with quoins, and a stone slate roof with coped gables and moulded kneelers on the left. There are two storeys and a cellar, two bays, and a rear single-storey outshut. The doorway on the front has a quoined surround and a Tudor arch. The windows are double chamfered, and some mullions have been retained.	II
Farm buildings, Bagden Hall Farm; 53.58281°N 1.63199°W	—	1659	The farm buildings were rebuilt at the rear in the 19th century. They are in stone with quoins on the right, and a stone slate roof with a coped gable and kneelers on the right. There are two doorways, one with a moulded surround and a Tudor arch, and both have initialled and dated lintels. At the rear is a continuous outshut. The windows are double chamfered, and there is a continuous hood mould over the ground floor openings.	II
Rock House; 53.56327°N 1.65890°W	—	1684	A stone house, the left gable rendered, with quoins, and a stone slate roof with hollow chamfered coping and moulded kneelers to the right gable. There are two storeys, two bays, and a continuous outshut at the rear. The doorway is quoined and has a deep lintel inscribed with the date and initials. The windows are double chamfered with mullions, there is a continuous hood mould over the ground floor openings, and in the gable apex is a dovecote.	II
Manor Farm; 53.56225°N 1.65905°W	—	1694	The farmhouse is in stone with quoins and a stone slate roof. There are two storeys, three bays and a gabled wing on the left, giving an L-shaped plan. In the main range is a doorway with a quoined surround, a deep lintel inscribed with a name and the date, and a moulded hood. To the right is another arched entrance, and the windows are chamfered with mullions, some with hood moulds. In the gable apex of the wing is a three-tier dovecote.	II
31 Cumberworth Lane; Upper Cumberworth; 53.57588°N 1.68287°W	—	17th or early 18th century	A pebbledashed house with quoins and a stone slate roof. There are two storeys, a single-storey extension to the right, and a rear outshut. The door on the left has a quoined surround and a Tudor arched lintel. The window in the ground floor has been altered, and has a hood mould, and in the upper floor are mullioned windows.	II
18, 20 and 22 Lower Denby Lane; 53.56595°N 1.64363°W	—	17th or early 18th century	A divided house in rendered stone with a stone slate roof. There are two storeys, a rectangular plan, and double gables at the rear. Most of the windows are mullioned, and some have hood moulds.	II
Bentley Grange Farmhouse; 53.61597°N 1.59824°W	—	17th or early 18th century	A stone farmhouse with quoins, and a stone slate roof with coped gables and kneelers. There are two storeys and an L-shaped plan, with three bays on each main front. Some of the doorways and some of the windows have chamfered surrounds, and some windows have hood moulds.	II
Braggs Farmhouse; 53.58040°N 1.66586°W	—	17th or early 18th century	The house is in rendered stone with quoins, and a stone slate roof with coped gables and moulded kneelers. There are two storeys, the windows are mullioned with some mullions removed, and some have hood moulds.	II
St Nicholas' Church, Upper Cumberworth; 53.57561°N 1.68261°W		17th or 18th century	The oldest part of the church is the lower part of the tower, the rest of the church being rebuilt in 1879. It is built in stone with a Welsh slate roof, and consists of a nave, a south porch, a chancel with a north vestry and a west tower. The tower has diagonal buttresses, a blind arched window on the south side with a dated lintel and a small ogee-headed window below. On the top is a pyramidal roof and an iron weathervane.	II
White Cross Farmhouse; 53.61140°N 1.61281°W	—	17th or early 18th century	The farmhouse, which was extended in 1763 and later, is in stone with parts rebuilt in brick, quoins, and a stone slate roof that has gables with chamfered copings and moulded kneelers. There are two storeys and a central gable at the front and the rear. The extension to the left has three bays, and contains a doorway with a rectangular fanlight and sash windows. At the rear are double chamfered windows with mullions, and some with hood moulds.	II
Low House Farmhouse; 53.56336°N 1.68055°W	—	1717	The farmhouse and adjoining stables are in stone with quoins, a string course, and a stone slate roof that has gables with chamfered copings and kneelers. There are two storeys, a rear outshut, and a small rounded lean-to extension. The doorway has a chamfered surround and a deep lintel with an initialled and dated panel. The windows are double chamfered with mullions, and in the outshut is a cross window and a gabled dormer.	II
2 Balk Lane and barn, Upper Cumberworth; 53.57594°N 1.68244°W	—	18th century	A laithe house converted for residential use, it is in stone with a stone slate roof. The house to the right has two storeys, a rear outshut, a main doorway with a dated and initialled Tudor arched lintel, another doorway to the left, and windows from which the mullions have been removed, one with a hood mould. The former barn contains a square-headed cart entry.	II
Bilham Lodge; 53.59347°N 1.60540°W	—	18th century (probable)	A stone house, partly rendered, with quoins, and a stone slate roof that has gables with chamfered copings and kneelers. There are two storeys and three bays. The doorway has a chamfered quoined surround and a chamfered lintel, and the windows are chamfered and mullioned, those in the ground floor with hood moulds. In the gable apex facing the road is a diagonally set opening with a hood mould.	II
Farm buildings northwest of Kirby Grange Hall; 53.62422°N 1.63107°W	—	18th century	The buildings consist of a dairy, stable and hayloft, with a barn added at right angles in the early 19th century. They are in stone with sandstone dressings and stone slate roofs. The dairy block has two storeys, and contains a central wide doorway with a hayloft door above, and various windows. The barn has five bays, and contains opposing cart entries with tie-stone jambs and voussoirs. In the south gable end is a square pitching hole, and in the north gable end is a round owl hole.	II
Packhorse Bridge; 53.60102°N 1.60742°W		18th century	The packhorse bridge carries a footpath over the River Dearne. It is stone, and consists of a single segmental arch with a humpback. The bridge has voussoirs, parapets, and a stone-flagged walkway.	II
Low House; 53.56278°N 1.68157°W	—	Mid to late 18th century	A large house with quoins, and a stone slate roof with coped gables and kneelers. There are two storeys and a basement at the lower end. On the garden front are a two-storey bay window, sash windows, and a doorway with a cornice on consoles. The entrance on the road front is in the upper floor, and has porch and a doorway with a chamfered quoined surround.	II
Moor Head Farmhouse and cottage 53.61108°N 1.66096°W	—	1769	The farmhouse and the adjoining cottage, which is later, are in stone with quoins and a stone slate roof. There are two storeys, each part has two bays, and at the rear of the cottage is a gabled wing. Each part has a central porch and mullioned windows, and the farmhouse has a dated and inscribed lintel.	II
4–10 Coalpit Lane, Upper Denby; 53.56284°N 1.65608°W	—	1770	A pair of stone houses with quoins, a stone slate roof, and two storeys. There are two doorways, one partly blocked, with deep lintels one lintel initialled and dated. The windows are mullioned, some mullions have been removed, and there is a small bow window inserted in the upper floor.	II
4 and 6 Low Fold, Lower Cumberworth; 53.58035°N 1.66436°W	—	Late 18th century	A pair of weavers' back-to-back houses in stone with quoins, a stone slate roof, and three storeys. The windows are mullioned, with six lights in the upper two floors and four lights in the ground floor.	II
Gilthwaites Farmhouse; 53.57969°N 1.65180°W	—	Late 18th century	A stone farmhouse with quoins, a stone slate roof, and two storeys. There are two doorways on the front, and the windows are mullioned.	II
Main barn, Gilthwaites Farm; 53.57984°N 1.65168°W	—	Late 18th century	The barn is in stone with quoins, a stone slate roof, and a later extension to the right. It contains a segmental-arched cart entry, and there is a smaller similar opening at the rear.	II
Green Hollows; 53.56332°N 1.68117°W	—	Late 18th century	A pair of cottages that were extended in the 19th century, and later combined into one dwelling. It is in stone with quoins, a stone slate roof, two storeys, two bays, and extensions to the rear and to the right. Near the centre is a doorway with a chamfered surround, and a plainer doorway to the left. The windows include sashes, and a tall stair window in the right extension.	II
Wesleyan Methodist Church, Denby Dale; 53.57376°N 1.65736°W		1799–1801	The church, which was enlarged in 1859, is built in stone and has a stone slate roof and two storeys. The entrance front has five bays and a pedimented gable with an inscribed and dated tablet in the tympanum. In the middle three bays is a projecting doorcase with Corinthian pilasters, an entablature, and a blocking course. It contains two round-headed doorways with a round-headed window between, all with imposts and keystones. The other windows are also round-headed, there are three bays along the sides, and an apse at the rear.	II
3 and 4 Manor Road, Clayton West; 53.60077°N 1.60832°W	—	Late 18th or early 19th century	A stone farmhouse with quoins, and a stone slate roof with coped gables and kneelers. There are three storeys, three bays, an 18th-century two-storey wing, and a later single-storey wing to the road. The central doorway has a moulded surround and a deep lintel. The windows are mullioned, with hood moulds in the lower two floors, continuous in the ground floor.	II
21 and 23 Bilham Road, Clayton West; 53.59343°N 1.60786°W	—	Late 18th or early 19th century	A pair of stone houses with quoins, a stone slate roof, and two storeys. Two doorways have heavy jambs and lintels, there is a later doorway to the right, and the windows are mullioned.	II
22 and 24 King Street, Skelmanthorpe; 53.59190°N 1.64694°W	—	1810	A pair of weaver's houses in stone with quoins, and a stone slate roof with coped gables and kneelers. There are three storeys, each house has one bay, in the centre is a doorway with a deep lintel and a date plaque above, and to the left is a later doorway. Most of the windows are mullioned, and in the top floor is a continuous ten-light window.	II
Church of England School, Upper Cumberworth; 53.57539°N 1.68438°W	—	1820	The school is in stone with a hipped slate roof, and has a single storey. The original part contains four three-light Gothic windows with intersecting tracery. In the centre is an oval inscribed and dated plaque. To the left is a later brick porch and to the right a later gabled wing.	II
1 Wood Street, Skelmanthorpe; 53.59202°N 1.65616°W	—	Early 19th century	A stone house with a stone slate roof, two storeys, two bays, and a rear outshut. The doorway has large jambs and a deep lintel, and there is an inserted doorway to the left. The windows are mullioned.	II
Broomhill; 53.56380°N 1.68211°W	—	Early 19th century	A stone house with a stone slate roof, hipped over the bays, and with coped gables. There are two storeys, three projecting bays under a gable, and single-bay wings. The central doorway has engaged fluted Doric columns, a rectangular fanlight, an entablature, and a segmental pediment. The windows are sashes with twelve panes, in the gable apex is an oculus, and at the rear is a tall round-arched stair window.	II
Former weaving shop southwest of Gilthwaites Farmhouse; 53.57954°N 1.65190°W	—	Early 19th century	The building is in stone, and has a stone slate roof with coped gables and kneelers, and three storeys. In the ground floor are two entrances and a loading door, and each upper floor has a seven-light mullioned window, the middle light blocked.	II
Three-storey mill building, Hartcliffe Mills; 53.57125°N 1.66476°W	—	Early 19th century	The building is in stone, and has a stone slate roof with coped gables and kneelers to the north. There are three storeys on the east front and two on the west, and seven bays. The windows are sashes, and external steps lead up to a first floor doorway.	II
Road bridge over River Dearne; 53.60103°N 1.60860°W	—	Early 19th century	The bridge carries Wakefield Road (A636 road) over the River Dearne. It is in stone and consists of two round skew arches, and has a flat carriageway. The bridge has voussoirs, string courses, keystones, and coped parapets.	II
31 Carr Hill Road, Upper Cumberworth; 53.57471°N 1.68959°W	—	Early to mid 19th century	A stone house with a sill band, and a stone slate roof with a coped gable and kneelers on the right. There are two storeys, three bays, and a later rear extension. The windows are mullioned, in the upper floor is a continuous nine-light window, and in the rear extension is a first-floor taking-in door.	II
39, 41 and 42 Station Road, Skelmanthorpe; 53.59444°N 1.65352°W	—	Early to mid 19th century	A row of three weavers' houses in stone with a continuous sill band, and coped gables and two storeys. The windows are mullioned, and each house has a six-light window.	II
Birds Edge Mill; 53.56750°N 1.69645°W		Early or mid 19th century	The mill is in stone with stone slate roofs, and has two blocks. The block nearer the road has four storeys and sides of seven and four bays, and the further block is lower and longer, with three storeys and 28 bays. The windows are nine-pane casements, and there is a Venetian window in each gable end.	II
L-shaped range, Bentley Grange Farmhouse; 53.61613°N 1.59881°W	—	Early to mid 19th century	A former stable range with a barn at right angles, they are in stone with stone slate roofs, hipped over the barn. The stable range has two storeys, and contains two wide doorways with heavy jambs and lintels and similar windows. In the barn are two large elliptical-arched openings with quoined jambs.	II
Emley Woodhouse; 53.61435°N 1.60608°W		Early to mid 19th century	The dower house for Bretton Hall, later a private house, it is in stone with an eaves cornice and a hipped slate roof, and is in Georgian style. There are two storeys, three bays on the front, two bays on the sides, and a recessed right wing. Steps lead up to the central doorway that has attached Doric columns, a fanlight, and an entablature. The windows are sashes with cornices, and at the rear is a Venetian stair window.	II
Lane Hackings Farmhouse; 53.58162°N 1.66002°W	—	Early to mid 19th century	A stone farmhouse with quoins, and a stone slate roof with coped gables and kneelers. There are two storeys and six bays. On the front is a porch, and the windows are mullioned.	II
Lane Side; 53.57788°N 1.67720°W	—	Early to mid 19th century	A pair of cottages later combined into one house, it is in stone with a sill band, moulded gutter brackets, and a stone slate roof with coped gables and kneelers. There are two storeys, and the windows are mullioned.	II
Milestone in garden of Salt Pie; 53.56398°N 1.68897°W	—	Early to mid 19th century	The milestone is in a garden to the south of Penistone Road (A629 road). It is in stone, and has a triangular front inscribed with the distances to Huddersfield and Penistone.	II
The Crown and adjoining house 53.56952°N 1.69960°W		Early to mid 19th century	A laithe house and an adjoining larger later house at right angles, in stone with stone slate roofs. The larger house, at one time a public house, has three storeys and two bays. In the centre is a doorway, above it is a blind window painted with the name of the house, and the windows are mullioned; in the top floor they have six and four lights. The laithe house has two storeys, a central doorway, altered windows in the ground floor, and a 13-light window above. The barn contains a large segmental-arched doorway and a smaller doorway, and at the rear is a blocked cart entry.	II
St Augustine's Church, Scissett; 53.58982°N 1.62619°W		1837–40	The chancel was added in 1880 and the porch in 1934. The church is built in stone with slate roofs, and consists of a nave, a south porch, a chancel with an apse and diagonally-set chapels, and a west tower. The tower has four stages, a round stair turret on the north side, and a parapet with stubby octagonal corner pinnacles. Along the sides of the nave are lancet windows and a parapet.	II
Baptist Chapel and Sunday School, Clayton West; 53.59395°N 1.60971°W	—	1840	The building, which was extended in 1860, is in stone with a hipped slate roof. There is one storey, and on the symmetrical front are three tall round-arched windows with imposts and keystones. Between the windows are two square-headed doorways, and above each is an inscribed and dated tablet.	II
L-shaped block, Nortonthorpe Mills; 53.58619°N 1.62923°W		Mid 19th century	Two blocks at right angles, they are in stone on a plinth, with bands and hipped slate roofs. There are three storeys and a part-basement, and on the front facing the road the left block has three bays and the right block has seven. In the centre of each block steps lead up to a doorway with an architrave, pilasters, a frieze, a cornice, a blocking course, double doors and a fanlight. Most of the windows on the front are 16-pane sashes. Between the blocks is a doorway that has a segmental arch with a keystone, and above that is a segmental-headed inscribed cornice. In the left return is a segmental-headed cart entry.	II
Stocks; 53.57553°N 1.68266°W		19th century (probable)	The stocks are in the churchyard of St Nicholas' Church, Upper Cumberworth. They consist of two stone posts with pointed tops. The lower parts are slotted for rails.	II
Friends' Meeting House; 53.56339°N 1.68088°W		1864	The meeting house, which incorporates earlier material, is in stone with quoins and a stone slate roof. The meeting hall has one storey, with two storeys to the left, and there are four bays. At the entrance is a protruding square porch that has a door with a semicircular fanlight with radial glazing bars. The windows are sashes with 24 panes. At the rear is a re-set dated lintel.	II
All Saints Church, Clayton West; 53.59456°N 1.61067°W		1875	The church is in stone with a slate roof, and consists of a nave with a clerestory, a lean-to south aisle, and a chancel. On the roof at the east end of the nave is a flèche. The west end has a wheel window, and along the sides are lancet windows.	II
Central Methodist Church, Skelmanthorpe; 53.59131°N 1.65007°W	—	Late 19th century	The church is in stone with a green slate roof, and consists of a nave and aisles. The north entrance front has two storeys, a central doorway with a pointed head under a gable, and flanked by lancet windows. Above it is a large four-light window and a frieze. These are flanked by buttresses rising to pinnacles, and at the top is a gable with finials. Along the sides are three bays with paired lancet windows and buttresses between the bays.	II
Forecourt wall and gates, Central Methodist Church; 53.59150°N 1.65002°W	—	Late 19th century	The wall enclosing the forecourt to the church is in stone and contains iron gates.	II
Milepost near Litherop Lane; 53.60865°N 1.59519°W		Late 19th century	The milepost is on the southeast side of Wakefield Road (A636 road). It is in cast iron on a stone post, and has a triangular plan and a curved top. On the top is "WAKEFIELD & DENBY DALE ROAD" and "EMLEY", and on the sides are the distances to Denby Dale and Wakefield.	II
Milepost at junction with Park Road; 53.59873°N 1.61254°W		Late 19th century	The milepost is on the southeast side of Wakefield Road (A636 road). It is in cast iron on a stone post, and has a triangular plan and a curved top. On the top is "WAKEFIELD & DENBY DALE ROAD" and "CLAYTON WEST", and on the sides are the distances to Denby Dale and Wakefield.	II
Milepost west of 195 Wakefield Road; 53.58733°N 1.62802°W		Late 19th century	The milepost is on the southeast side of Wakefield Road (A636 road). It is in cast iron on a stone post, and has a triangular plan and a curved top. On the top is "WAKEFIELD & DENBY DALE ROAD" and "SKELMANTHORPE", and on the sides are the distances to Denby Dale and Wakefield.	II
Milepost opposite 268A Wakefield Road; 53.57704°N 1.64474°W		Late 19th century	The milepost is on the southeast side of Wakefield Road (A636 road). It is in cast iron on a stone post, and has a triangular plan and a curved top. On the top is "WAKEFIELD & DENBY DALE ROAD" and "SKELMANTHORPE", and on the sides are the distances to Denby Dale and Wakefield.	II
Milestone near junction with Barnsley Road; 53.57125°N 1.66664°W		Late 19th century	The milepost is on the southeast side of Wakefield Road (A636 road). It is in cast iron on a stone post, and consists of a flat plate with a curved top. On the top is "WAKEFIELD & DENBY DALE ROAD" and "DENBY DALE", and below are the distances to Denby Dale and Wakefield.	II
Milepost near Denby Lane; 53.56727°N 1.63582°W	—	Late 19th century	The milepost is on the south side of Barnsley Road (A635 road). It is in cast iron on a stone post, and has a triangular plan and a curved top. On the top is "BARNSLEY & SHEPLEY ROAD" and "DENBY", and on the sides are the distances to Denby Dale, Cawthorne, Holmfirth, and Barnsley.	II
Milestone at base of viaduct 53.56964°N 1.65992°W		Late 19th century	The milepost is on the south side of Barnsley Road (A635 road). It is in cast iron on a stone post, and has a triangular plan and a curved top. On the top is "BARNSLEY & SHEPLEY LANE HEAD ROAD" and "DENBY", and on the sides are the distances to Cawthorne, Holmfirth, and Barnsley.	II
Denby Dale Railway Viaduct; 53.57163°N 1.66236°W		1877–80	The railway viaduct was built by the Lancashire and Yorkshire Railway to carry its line over the valley of the River Dearne. It is in stone, it has a curving plan, and consists of 21 round-headed arches on rectangular piers. On each side at the west end are later square abutments, each with two arches.	II
Engine House, Nortonthorpe Mills; 53.58640°N 1.62909°W		1885–86	The engine house is in stone with a stone slate roof, one storey, and five bays. Each bay contains a round-headed opening with a keystone, and there is a linking impost band; the outer openings are windows, and the middle one a doorway. On the roof are two circular metal ventilators.	II
St Aiden's Church, Skelmanthorpe; 53.59005°N 1.65500°W		1894–95	The church, designed by G. F. Bodley and T. Garner, is built in stone with a brick south wall and a slate roof. It consists of a nave and a chancel as one unit, a north aisle under a separate roof, a north porch and a south vestry. Above the chancel arch is a small gabled bellcote. There are wheel windows on the south side of the chancel and in the porch.	II
Arqiva Tower; 53.61207°N 1.66435°W		1969–71	A television transmitting mast built for the Independent Television Authority by Ove Arup and Partners. It is in reinforced concrete, it tapers throughout its height of 274 metres (899 ft) and is surmounted by an aerial casing of 54 metres (177 ft). When it was completed it was the highest free-standing structure in the United Kingdom.	II
