= Huddersfield Central Cricket League =

Cricket league in West Yorkshire

The Huddersfield Central Cricket League was a Cricket league featuring teams in and around the town of Huddersfield, West Yorkshire, England between 1913 and 2016.

== History ==
The league was founded in December 1913. The league's first matches, with 9 member teams, began in May 1914. Primrose Hill was the first champion.

In 1919 the league amalgamated with the Holme and Dearne Valley League after some founder clubs left to join the Huddersfield District League.

Teams in this league were based in the town of Huddersfield, in the Colne and Holme Valleys surrounding the town, from the Spen Valley, from the nearby city of Wakefield and South Yorkshire towns of Penistone and Barnsley.

== Holden and Tinker Cups ==
In 1928 a knockout competition was held for the 1st XI teams called the Holden Cup. The first winners were Skelmanthorpe. It was renamed the Allsop Cup in 1952 in honour of former Cumberworth United player Friend Allsop. Scholes won this competition a record 9 times.

The knockout competition for 2nd XI teams called the Tinker Cup and was first held in 1929. Denby Dale won this competition the most times, six.

== Centenary and dissolution ==
The league celebrated its centenary in 2013 and was dissolved after the 2016 season with Mount CC from Batley being the final champion team, winning section A.

Throughout the league's history, clubs have been joining and leaving other nearby cricket leagues. The league's former teams now play in the Huddersfield, the Halifax, the Barnsley and the Pontefract & District Cricket Leagues.

== Teams in the final 2016 season ==
- Almondburians
- Augustinians
- Birchencliffe
- Bradley & Colne
- Calder Grove
- Cartworth Moor
- Denby Grange
- Edgerton & Dalton
- Flockton
- Green Moor
- Higham
- Holmbridge
- Horbury Bridge
- Leymoor
- Mount
- Nortonthorpe

== Former league teams ==
- Almondbury
- Almondbury Wesleyians
- Armitage Bridge
- Azaad
- Badger Hill
- Birkby Former Members Association (FMA)
- Birkby Rose Hill
- Bretton
- British Dyes Company
- Broad Oak
- Cawthorne
- Clayton West
- Crigglestone
- Crossbank Methodists
- Cumberworth United
- David Browns
- Denby
- Denby Dale
- Denby Grange
- Dewsbury Moorlands
- Dodworth
- Emley Clarence
- Gawthorpe St Marys
- Hall Bower
- Harry Lime
- Heckmondwike & Carlinghow
- Hepworth
- Honley Wesleyians
- Hoylandswaine
- International Caribbean
- Karrier Carworks
- Kexborough
- Lepton Highlanders
- Mirfield
- Meltham
- Moldgreen WMC
- Netherton
- Overthorpe
- Penistone
- Penistone Netherfield
- Penistone Sports
- Penistone YS
- Primrose Hill
- Rowley Hill
- Ruddlesdens
- St Andrews
- Salendine Nook Baptists
- Salendine Nook Old Boys (SNOBs)
- Scholes
- Shelley
- Shepley
- Silkstone United
- Skelmanthorpe
- Thongsbridge
- Thornhil & Westborough
- Thurstonland
- Upperthong
- Upper Cumberworth
- Upper Hopton
- Westborough
- Woodfield Park
- Woolley Miners Welfare
- YMCA
