= Emley =

Village in West Yorkshire, England

Coordinates: 53.612996°N 1.635682°W

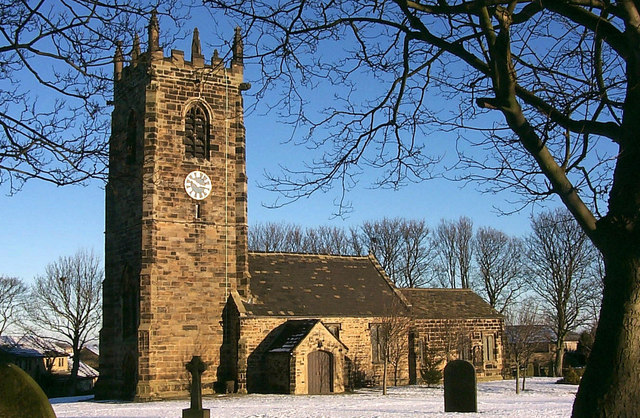
- St Michael the Archangel

- Location within West Yorkshire
- Population: 1,434
- OS grid reference: SE242130
- Civil parish: Denby Dale
- Metropolitan borough: Kirklees
- Metropolitan county: West Yorkshire
- Region: Yorkshire and the Humber
- Country: England
- Sovereign state: United Kingdom
- Post town: HUDDERSFIELD
- Postcode district: HD8
- Dialling code: 01924
- Police: West Yorkshire
- Fire: West Yorkshire
- Ambulance: Yorkshire
- UK Parliament: Ossett and Denby Dale

Emley is a village in the parish of Denby Dale, in Huddersfield in the Kirklees district of West Yorkshire, England. The village lies roughly in the middle of a triangle between Huddersfield, Wakefield and Barnsley. It is around 8 miles (13 km) south-east of Huddersfield, 9 miles (14 km) south-west of Wakefield and 10.5 miles (17 km) north-west of Barnsley. In the 2021 census it has a population of 1,434. The village dates from Anglo-Saxon times and is on high ground, close to the Emley Moor transmitting station. The village is the home of the famous non league football club Emley A.F.C.

== History ==
The name "Emley" is derived from an Old English personal name, Em(m)a or Eama, and lēah, a wood or woodland clearing. The village was recorded as Amalaie and Amelai in the 1086 Domesday Book and usually as Emmeley by the 13th century. The Saxon settlement was at Emley Park. An influx of invading Danes settled in the area in the 9th century, as evidenced by place names ending in by and thorpe.

=== Manor ===
After the Norman Conquest, Godric, a descendant of the original Saxon settlers, was retained as lord of the manor by William the Conqueror and Emley became part of the Royal Manor of Wakefield. Godric passed the manor to his son, Ketelbern, some time after 1080, and he in turn passed it to his son Godric. Godric's descendants adopted the Norman practice of having a surname; William Fitzgodric, born in 1140, was lord of the manor followed by his son William using the surname Fitzwilliam. The Fitzwilliams retained the manor for many generations. They lived in a moated house on the site of the Old Hall in Emley Park. When Edward II marched against the Scots in 1312 in retaliation against border raids, he summoned his nobles to provide men-at-arms. Sir William Fitzwilliam and men from Emley joined the king at Berwick-on-Tweed, and they may have fought with the king in the Battle of Bannockburn. His son William was executed at Pontefract for his part in Thomas, 2nd Earl of Lancaster's rebellion. Sir John Fitzwilliam and the rector died in 1348, possibly from the Black Death, and by 1350 the manor was described as "ruinous". The Fitzwilliams left Emley at this time and moved to another property at Sprotborough.

In 1417 a Sir John Fitzwilliam succeeded his father at the age of 20 and served Henry V in France during the Hundred Years' War; he died in Rouen in 1421. His heir, a 12-month-old son, William was lord of the manor until 1474 when the manor passed to his 10-year-old grandson William. He died young and without issue and the Fitzwilliam association with Emley came to an end. He left his estate to Thomas Soothill, who had married his aunt, and he in turn left it to their daughter Elizabeth, who married Sir Henry Savile. The Savile family became lords of the manor. Sir Henry Savile came from a family whose history has been recorded since 1160. The Savile family seat was Thornhill Hall. Most of the Saviles never lived in Emley and rarely visited; their estate was managed by stewards or agents. Sir George's first son, Edward was "of weak intellect" and after him the manor passed to his cousin, George who married Mary Talbot of Rufford Abbey. Their son George inherited the manor when he was 11 but died five years later and the manor passed to his brother William, a staunch Royalist who was with the king at Nottingham in 1642 at the start of the English Civil War. In October 1643 he commanded the Royalist cavalry at the Battle of Winceby and was made Governor of Sheffield and later York. Sir William died at York fighting for the king in January 1644. Sir George Savile inherited the manor at the age of 11 but lived at Rufford Abbey. John Saville, born in 1818, inherited the manor in 1856 and was created 1st Baron Savile in 1888. When the 2nd Baron Savile died in April 1931, Rufford was sold and the 3rd Baron, George Savile, who inherited the manor, bought Gryce Hall near Kirkburton. George Halifax Lumley Savile, born in 1919, made his home at Gryce Hall. He died in June 2008 with no children, and the manor passed to his nephew, John Anthony Thornhill Lumley-Savile, who sold Gryce Hall and other lands in Yorkshire.

=== Industry ===
Mining had an important role but before coal mining began, iron ore was discovered around Bentley Grange which led to the establishment of iron ore mines and a forge by the monks of Byland Abbey under a licence granted by Sir William Fitzwilliam (the first lord of the manor to adopt the name Fitzwilliam) in 1217 and another endorsed by his son Sir Thomas Fitzwilliam in 1237. Grange, a name associated with many buildings in and around Emley including Bentley Grange, is a reference to Byland Abbey's outlying monastic farming estate, typically where sheep were kept. The remains of bell pits around Bentley Grange, a scheduled monument, are medieval workings from when iron ore was mined from the Tankersley seam.

The steep scarp slope overlooking the Dearne Valley south of the village contains the remains of day holes, medieval mines where coal was dug for iron forging. "Cole mynes" at Emley Woodhouse were operating in 1597 and possibly from shallow shafts on Emley Moor in the 17th century. The Jaggar family were the owners of Emley Moor Colliery in 1821 when winding was done by a horse gin.

Although farming was the main industry in Emley, by the 19th century rich coal deposits had made coal mining an important industry along with the more traditional weaving. Mining was a source of employment until 1985 when Emley Moor Colliery closed after the year-long miners' strike. There was briefly a suggestion that nine miners might band together to buy the colliery, which Margaret Thatcher encouraged. The site is now a business park.

=== 20th century ===
During the 1930s, the population of Emley was similar to the 1,867 figure recorded at the 2001 census. Farming and coal mining were the main industries, and the village had a baker, three butchers, a draper, three grocers, a tobacconist, painters, a blacksmith and a wheelwright. There was also a post office and a co-operative store, reading room and urban council offices.

Bank Wood was the location of a 'Q' site during the Second World War, a decoy for attacking enemy bombers. It was constructed from raised platforms with containers for oil or petrol and connected to a control station and fuel reservoir. The intention was to ignite the fuel to provide a decoy target to lead the enemy from their intended target, Horbury and Ossett railway station and associated marshalling yards. After the war, Bank Wood was open-cast and replanted after mining ended.

The village war memorial is in the corner of St Michael's graveyard and records the names of 15 men from Emley who lost their lives in two world wars. During the Second World War the Home Guard had checkpoints in the village, one at the bottom of Leisure Lane to guard the 'Q' site and another at Five Lane Ends, and anti aircraft gun and searchlight emplacements were located near and around the village. A German V-1 Flying Bomb exploded at Grange Moor late in the war and an Armstrong Whitworth Whitley bomber that had run out of fuel landed on Twenty Acre Field by Emley Moor. Once refuelled, it returned to its base.

=== Governance ===
Emley, an ancient parish, became a civil parish in 1866 and an urban district from 1894 to 1938 when it was added to Denby Dale Urban District. In 1951 the civil parish had a population of 1410. On 1 April 1974 the parish was abolished and merged with Denby Dale.

== Geography ==
The parish covered 3,120 acres (12.6 km^{2}) of mostly farmland on hilly ground. The underlying geology is the coal measures and sandstones of the South Yorkshire Coalfield. Tankersley ironstone occurs as thin seams and nodules of siderite in the mudstone above the Flockton Thick coal seam.

The village is made up of a number of distinct areas, Emley Woodhouse to the east, Warburton, Tyburn Hill to the south and Hag Hill to the south-east. Emley Moor Upper Crawshaw and the Stringer House Lane districts are to the west of the village, while Thorncliffe and the Grange Drive estate are to the north.

== Amenities ==
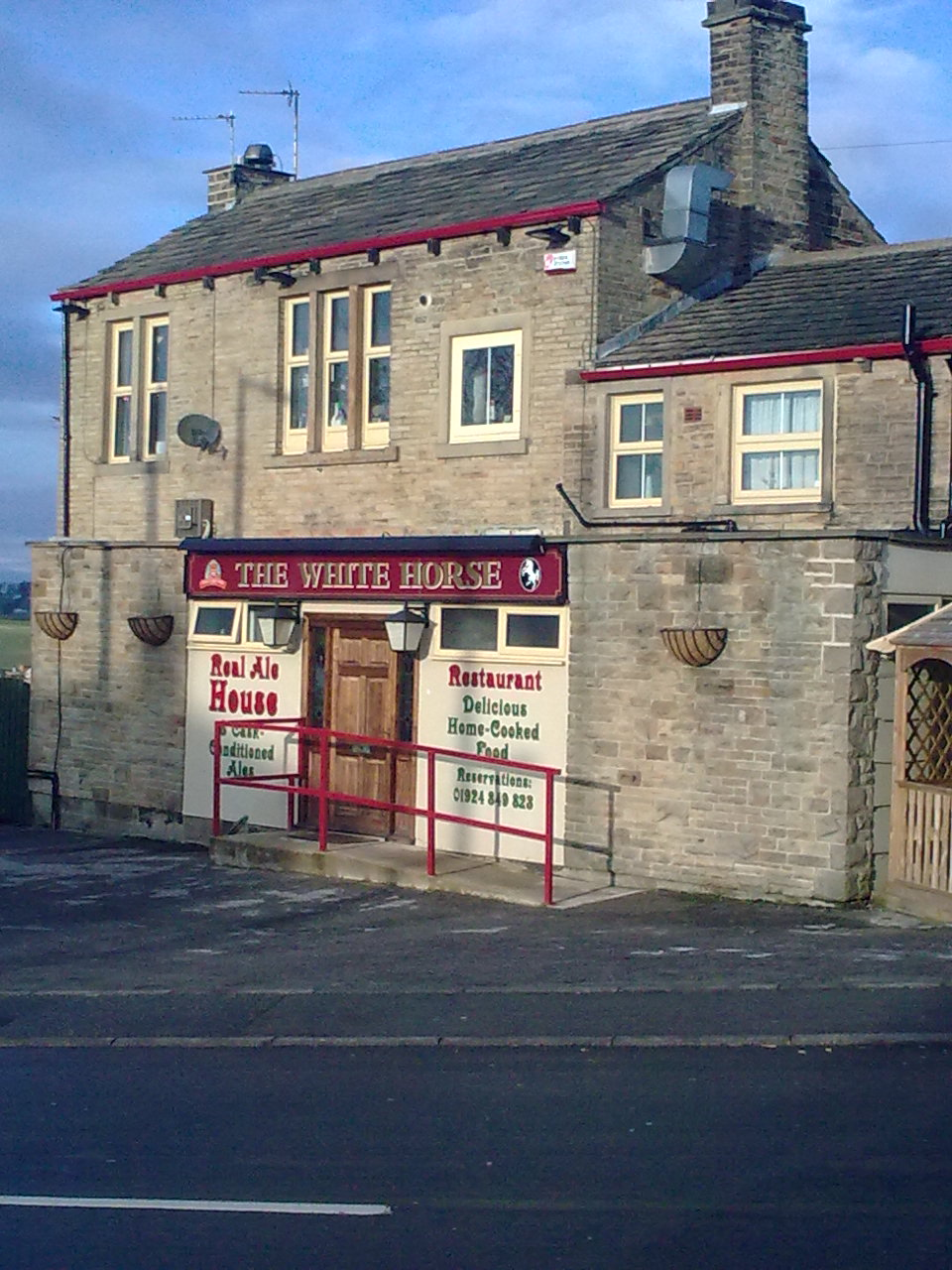
The White Horse public house

In the village centre near the cross is the Post Office and supermarket, original, the Post Office occupied the building across the road from the shop but the services are now merged into one building. The old Church Hall has been converted to a private residence. The Methodist church now houses the village playschool and the Emley Players, an amateur dramatics group.

In the 1830s the Temperance Movement was active in Emley and attempted to attract people away from public houses by providing the Temperance Hotel and Refreshment Room styled on one created by Edward Parker in Leeds. Once there were at least eight public houses within the parish but now there are two, the White Horse and the Wentworth which is in the old Emley FC supporters club at the Welfare Ground site. there is also the Emley AFC Sports Bar. There is a working men's club close to the TV transmitter at Emley Moor Crossroads.

== Landmarks ==
Emley and the surrounding villages are dominated by the transmitting station mast on Emley Moor, which at 331 metres high is bigger than the Eiffel Tower and a Grade II listed structure. Fans of Emley AFC sing a chant pertaining to the height difference between the two structures.

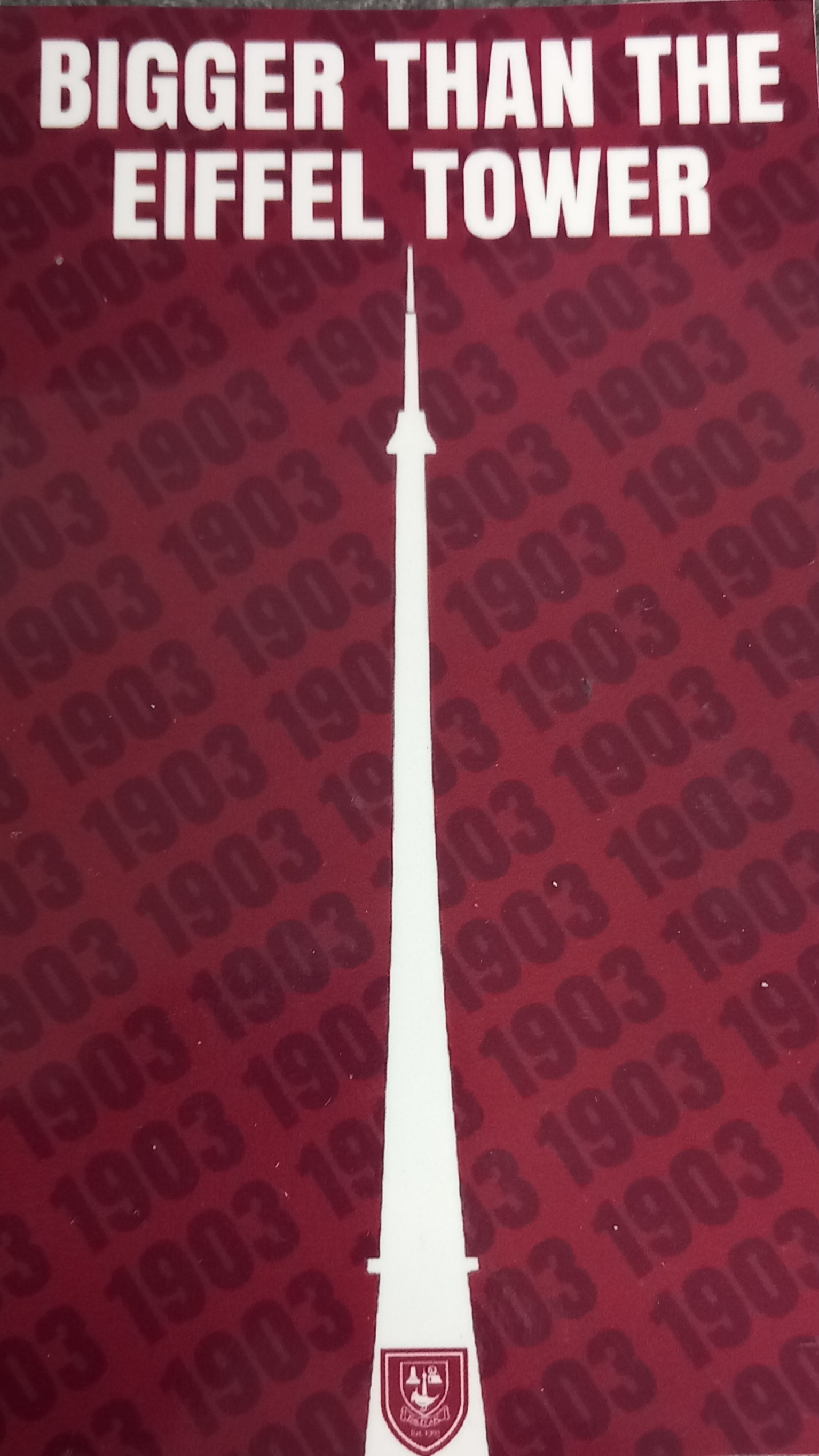
Fans of Emley AFC sing about the mast's size

Emley Cross – showing the location of the blacksmiths in the background

At the crossroads in the village are the remains of the market cross. Sir Thomas Fitzwilliam obtained the right to hold a weekly Thursday market and five-day May fair from King Henry II in 1253. The market cross, erected around this time, was more than three metres high. It was destroyed by Roundheads during the English Civil War and is now a stump. When Parliamentarians besieged Sandal Castle in 1645, a raiding party broke it down leaving only the stump. John Turton sold his wife Mary to William Kaye of Scissett for two half crowns by the cross during Emley Feast in 1826. She returned to her lawful husband after Kaye's death. At the turn of the 19th century, the stump was illuminated by a gas lamp that stood to the south. In 1961 it was hit by a lorry and was virtually destroyed. After being rebuilt by a local stonemason it was hit again by motor vehicles in 2012 and 2013, bringing about a call for its relocation. The market cross is a scheduled ancient monument and is Grade II listed.

A Millennium Green adjacent to Warburton was opened in 2000 on land purchased from the Savile estate for a park. Funds to purchase the land were raised via grants and fundraising events organised by the Millennium Green Trustees. It was developed by volunteers and a beacon was lit to coincide with Queen Elizabeth's Golden Jubilee celebrations.

The colliery, the mast, market cross and a Pewit feature on the crests of all the villages sports club and Emley Brass band.

== Religion ==
The war memorial by St Michael's Church

There was a pre-Conquest church at Warburton at the top of the slope called Kirkhills, above the manor house. It was replaced by a small Norman church on the same site before 1150, probably by Goderic, who gave land to the monks of Byland Abbey. When the Fitzwilliams left the village in the 14th century, a new church, was begun in the village centre using some materials from the old church. The present Church of St Michael the Archangel has its origins in this church and the nave is of Norman origin but much of the interior dates from the late medieval period and the church tower dates from the 15th century. It is a Grade I listed building. In the churchyard boundary wall is a stone cross from a house owned by the Knights Hospitallers.

Non-conformity began in Emley in 1798, when the Court of the Archbishop of York issued a licence to preach to John Silverwood. The act allowed him to use premises as a place of worship for Protestant Dissenters. Before that dissenters attended church at Birstall and attended classes at a meeting house in Briestfield. The Vicar of St Michael's reported that other than one Quaker and one Roman Catholic family there are no dissenters in the parish of Emley.

The Methodist church

The 1826 Wesley Chapel built at Warburton closed in 1913 and was converted for residential use as Wesley House. Bethel Chapel on Upper Lane was demolished in January 1997 and the site developed for residential purposes; Bethel House was one of the properties built in its place.

In 1828, a breakaway group of Methodists built the Primitive Methodist Chapel at the top of Warburton. This church remained functioning until the end of the Second World War and was converted to residential use. By 1850, Methodists from the Church Street congregation, known as Christian Brethren, had outgrown their place of worship and built a new church on the opposite side of Church Street slightly north of St Michael's. It remained a place of worship until 1910 when the current church was completed, (planning and construction started in 1906). The old church became a shop and then a garage, which was sold in 2005 to a developer, and is now housing called Chapel Royd.

Chapel House Farm built in 1687 from the remains of previous dwellings is close to the location of the chapel set up by the Knight Hospitallers. The ruins next to the house are all that remains. A Methodist chapel near the site of the transmitter and began services in March 1908. It was damaged when the first Emley Moor TV transmitter collapsed on 19 March 1969 and elements of the mast and its supporting guy wires crashed through its roof. The building ceased being a church in 1982 and was converted into two residential properties.

== Culture ==
In line with Yorkshire and coal mining traditions the Emley Brass Band with roots that date back to around 1870, rehearse at the bandroom near the cross.

South of the cross is the site of the old blacksmiths which has a stained glass window showing a scouts emblem and is now sometimes used by Ranger Boy Scouts. Scouts and Brownies meet in a scout hut adjacent to St Michael's Gardens.

The Emley Boundary Walk or the ancient beating the bounds was revived in 1863 and the most recent walk took place in 2014. They are usually held every seven years and the next is in 2021. The Emley Agricultural Show is an annual agricultural and horticultural event held on the first Saturday of August. It began in 1893 and currently takes place at Factory Farm on Emley Moor. It is organised by the Emley Show Society as a non-profit-making event and in 2011 attracted around 15,000 visitors. An open gardens event when residents open their gardens to visitors takes place annually. Proceeds are donated to local good causes.

The village and its surroundings have many public footpaths and bridleways attracting walkers to the Emley Village Trail and other walks.

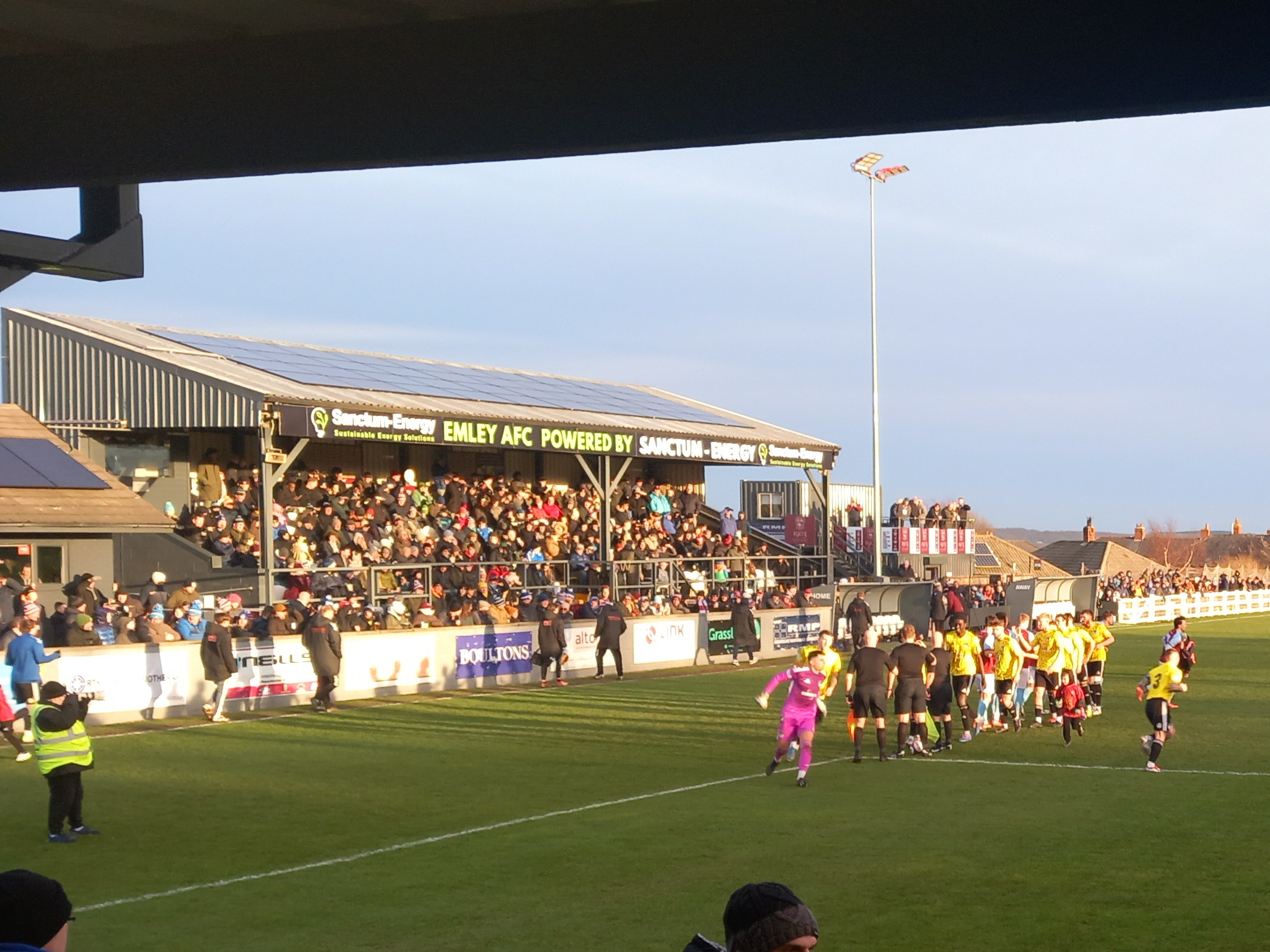
Emley's main stand on New Year's Day 2026

== Sport ==
Emley A.F.C. currently play at step 4 (level 8) of the National League System and attract support from around the local area on matchdays. the village's original football club made national headlines in the 1997–98 seasonwhen they progressed to the third round of the FA Cup, beating Morecambe and Lincoln City in the first and second rounds, before narrowly losing 2–1 at West Ham United in the third round. The club moved to Wakefield in 2000, where they were renamed Wakefield & Emley and later simply Wakefield. In 2005 the club split and A.F.C. Emley were formed to bring football back to the village's Welfare Ground, renamed The Fantastic Media Welfare Ground.

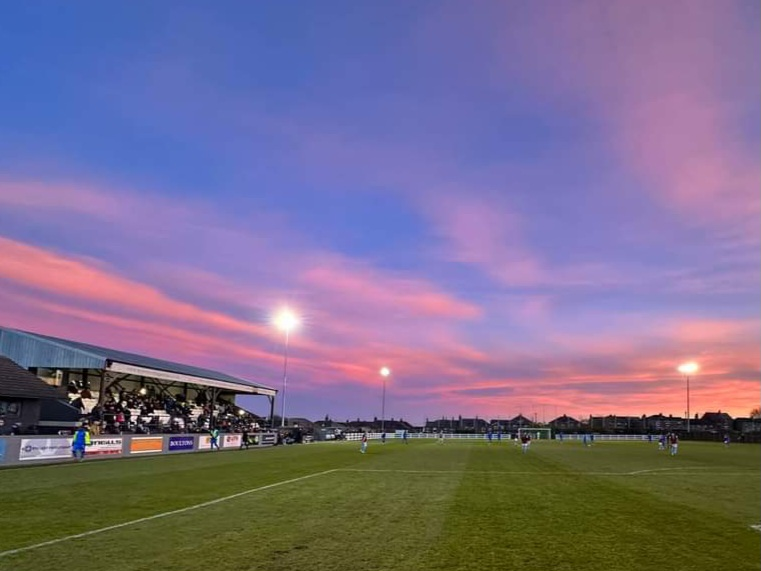
Sunset over the Fantastic Media Welfare Ground, Emley

The original Wakefield F.C. club folded in 2014 leaving A.F.C Emley as the sole club and in 2019, 5 years after the Wakefield club were wound up, the current club were renamed Emley AFC, and in 2022 all records and honours referring to Emley were transferred to the current club

In March 2019, the club restored the original name of Emley A.F.C. and in the summer of that year, they were informed that the club was being transferred to the North West Counties League (NWCFL) Division 1 North, In July 2020, it was announced that Emley would return to the Northern Counties East League where they had spent 14 years before the lateral move to the North West Counties Football League in the 2019–20 season. Therefore, after just 1 (curtailed) season in the NWCFL, Emley were transferred back to the NCEL for the 2020–21,

During the Coronavirus Pandemic both the 2019–20 and 2020–21 seasons were curtailed, but Emley were promoted to the NCEL Premier Division on a points per game (PPG) ratio and played in the Premier Division for the first time in 2021–22. Emley won promotion to the Northern Premier League Division 1 East as Northern Counties East League Champions and also won the Sheffield and Hallamshire Senior Cup for the first time in 25 years beating Maltby Main 2–0 in the final at Doncaster Rovers, as well as losing finalists in the NCEL League Cup final in 2024.

They are members of the Sheffield & Hallamshire FA.

Emley is also home to Emley Clarence Cricket Club, nicknamed The Clarence, who play in the Drakes Huddersfield League. both clubs share the facilities at the Welfare Ground in the centre of the village.

== See also ==
- Listed buildings in Denby Dale
