= Denby Dale Pies =

British pie manufacturer

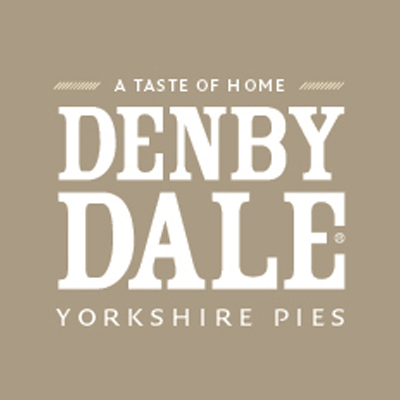

Denby Dale Pies is a manufacturer of pies founded in 2001 in the "Pie Village" of Denby Dale, West Yorkshire, England. Their products are sold in branches of Sainsbury's, Tesco, Waitrose, Co-op Food, Asda, Morrisons and Booths.

== History ==
The village of Denby Dale has a tradition baking giant pies to celebrate events and occasions of national importance. The first of these is thought to have been in 1788 to mark the return to sanity of King George III and the tenth, a Millennium Pie baked in 2000, measured 40 feet (12 m) and weighed 12 tons.

The Denby Dale Pie company was founded in 2001. It went into administration in 2011 and was sold to Chapel Foods Ltd. In 2012, Yorkshire laureate Ian McMillan wrote and performed a "Piem" about Denby Dale pies. Denby Dale Pies became part of Country Style Foods in 2016.

== Television features ==
In a 2012 episode of Channel 5's The Great Northern Cookbook, Denby Dale Pies took part in recreating the pie which marked the 1887 Golden Jubilee of Queen Victoria, based on historical accounts of the recipe, and weighing in at 3.8 tons.

The pies were also featured in a September 2015 episode of the hit BBC One show The Great British Bake Off.

== Awards and recognition ==
Denby Dale Pies was judged to produce the country's best meat and potato pie in a contest held by ITV's The Paul O'Grady Show in 2004, with the final of the competition held live on the teatime chat show. In 2012, the Denby Dale Chicken and Gravy Pie was awarded silver in the British Pie Awards. In July 2013, Princess Anne visited the company's flagship factory in Denby Dale.
