= Emley Moor transmitting station =

Telecommunications and broadcasting facility in West Yorkshire, England

Arqiva Emley Moor Tower
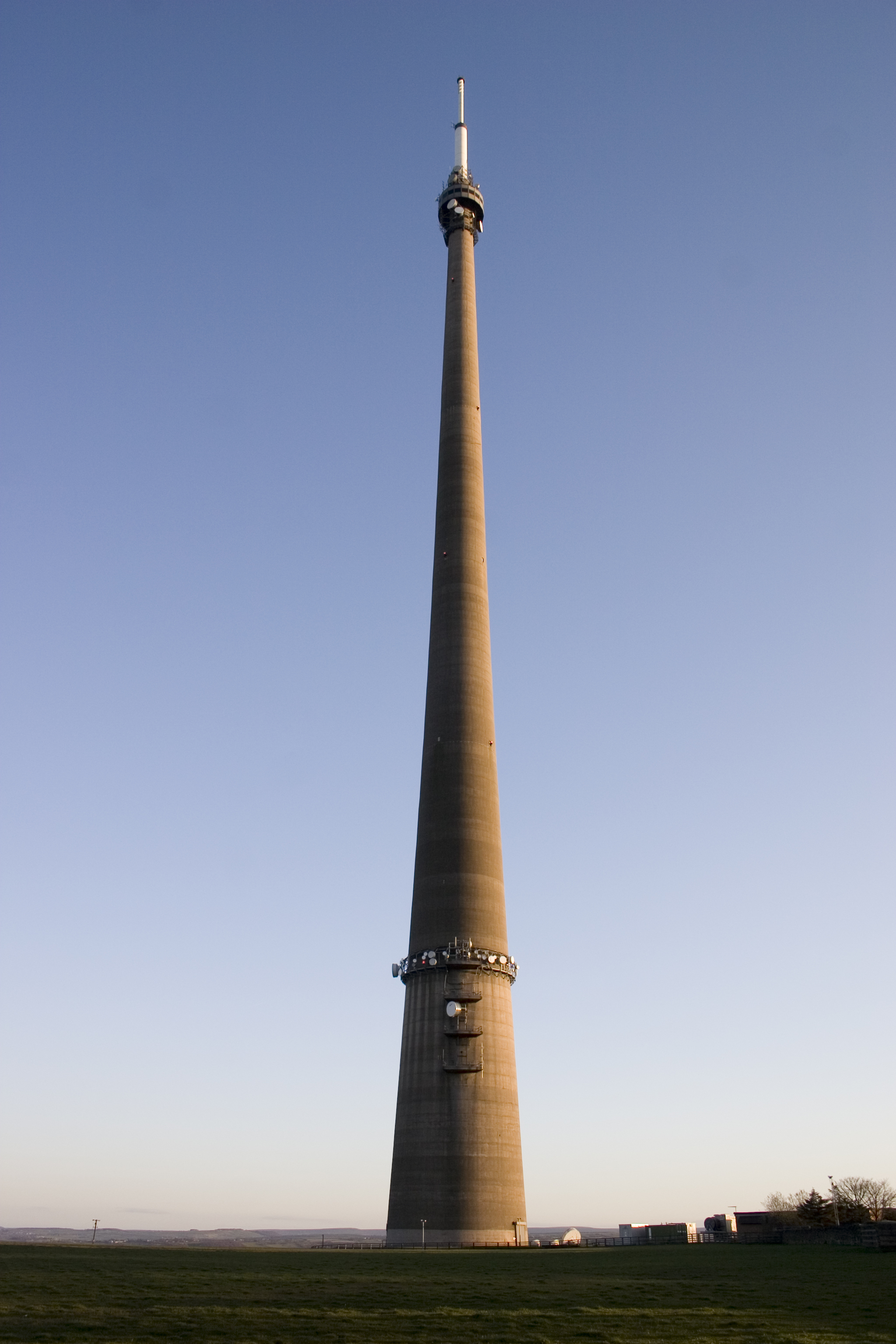

- Location within West Yorkshire
- Tower height: 1,047 ft (319 m)
- Coordinates: 53.611944°N 1.664444°W
- Grid reference: SE222128
- Built: 1969–1971
- BBC region: BBC Yorkshire
- ITV region: ITV Yorkshire
- Local TV service: Local TV Leeds; That's York

Listed Building – Grade II
- Official name: Arqiva Tower, Denby Dale
- Designated: 26 March 2003
- Reference no.: 1350339

The Emley Moor transmitting station is a telecommunications and broadcasting facility on Emley Moor, 1 mile (1.6 km) west of the village centre of Emley, (Note: It lies in OS grid square SE221899) near Huddersfield, in West Yorkshire, England.

It is made up of a 1,047 ft (319 m) concrete tower and apparatus that began to transmit in 1971. It is protected under UK law as a Grade II listed building. It is the tallest freestanding structure in the United Kingdom, and 25th tallest tower in the world. It was the seventh tallest freestanding structure and was fourth tallest tower in the European Union before Brexit. When built it was the sixth tallest freestanding structure in the world after the Ostankino Tower, the Empire State Building, 875 North Michigan Avenue (known as The John Hancock Center), the Berliner Fernsehturm and Tokyo Tower.

The tower's current official name, The Arqiva Tower, is shown on a sign beside the offices at the base of the tower, but it is commonly known just as "Emley Moor Mast" despite the current structure being a freestanding tower and not a guyed mast.

In 2021 the antenna was replaced, to accommodate frequency changes for mobile phone use, by a shorter antenna of 36 ft (11 m) but the structure still remains the tallest freestanding structure in the United Kingdom.

== History ==
Emley Moor has been a transmission site since the earliest days of commercial television in the UK. The present concrete tower is the third antenna support structure to have occupied the site.

=== Original transmitter on site ===
The first permanent transmitter built there was for ITV, covering much of the north of England. It had a 443-foot (135 m) lattice tower, which provided limited coverage. This original 443-foot (135 m) lattice tower was erected in 1956 to provide Independent Television broadcasts to the Yorkshire area. It entered service on 3 November 1956, transmitting Granada Television programmes on weekdays, and ABC TV programmes at weekends.

=== Second mast and 1969 collapse ===
In 1964 in anticipation of colour PAL transmissions set to begin in 1966, the original 443-foot (135 m) lattice tower was replaced by a taller 1,265-foot (385.5 m) guyed mast, identical to the structure at Belmont transmitting station in Lincolnshire. The dismantled lattice tower was rebuilt at Craigkelly transmitting station. Yorkshire Television commenced broadcasting from the Emley Moor transmitter following the reorganisation of the ITV franchises on 29 July 1968.

The guy-supported tubular mast was constructed from curved steel segments to form a 9-foot-diameter (2.75 m) tube, 902 feet (275 m) long, and was surmounted by a lattice section 351 feet (107 m) tall, and a capping cylinder, bringing the total height to 1,265 feet (385.5 m). At the time of its construction, it was one of the tallest human-made structures in the world. It was designed by British Insulated Callender's Cables (BICC), and manufactured by EMI, and built by J. L. Eve Construction.

Its ropes weighed 85 long tons (86 t), made by British Ropes, with steel from Steel, Peech and Tozer of Templeborough in South Yorkshire. The column weighed 210 long tons (210 t) and had 375 segments, with steel from United Steel Companies at Scunthorpe in northern Lincolnshire.

The cylindrical steel mast was regularly coated in ice during the winter, and large icicles formed on the guy wires, placing them under great strain. During winter, ice often fell from the guy-wires. For this reason, amber warning lights on the tower operated when ice was a hazard, and notices were posted on the fence adjacent to Jagger Lane, below the guy wire crossings.

On 19 March 1969, a combination of strong winds and the weight of ice that had formed around the top of the mast and on the guy wires caused the structure to collapse.

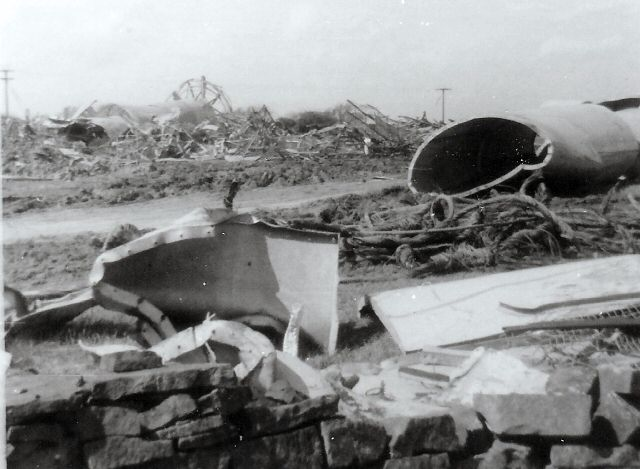
Wreckage of the Emley Moor Mast, which collapsed in March 1969, strewn across fields.

The collapse left sections of twisted mast strewn over the transmitter site, and across the junction of Common Lane and Jagger Lane, and the surrounding fields. Although a falling stay cable cut through the roof of a local chapel and across the transmitter site buildings, no one was injured. It completely disabled the BBC2 UHF transmitter and the ITV VHF transmitter, leaving several million people without service. BBC1 VHF television transmissions continued from Holme Moss. The Independent Television Authority (ITA) owned a collapsible emergency mast, 200 feet (61 m) tall, which was moved to Emley from the Lichfield transmitting station so that some service could be restored. ITV signals were restored to 2.5 million viewers within four days. The BBC provided a mobile mast on an outside broadcast van to restore a restricted BBC2 colour service within two days. The ITA bought a larger temporary mast from a Swedish company. A crew of Polish riggers were hired, and a 669-foot (204 m) mast was erected in under 28 days at a cost of £100,000 (equivalent to £1.5 million in 2025). This mast could hold only one set of antennae, so many viewers in outlying areas still could not receive colour programmes. The taller mast was brought into service on 16 April. Some weeks later, the BBC erected a 299-foot (91 m) mast, improving coverage.

Vortex shedding behind a circular cylinder. In this animation, the flows on the two sides of the cylinder are shown in different colours, to show that the vortices from the two sides alternate, which can build an oscillating motion in the cylinder.

The accumulation of ice was believed to have caused the collapse, but a committee of inquiry attributed it to vortex shedding which occurred over a five-year period of low but steady wind speed, enhanced during periods of high wind speed. Damping modifications, including hanging 150 long tons (150 t) of steel chains within each structure, were made to similar masts at Belmont and Winter Hill. None of the modified masts have collapsed.

A section of the collapsed tower was converted for use as a racing control tower at Huddersfield Sailing Club on Boshaw Whams Reservoir.

=== Current concrete tower ===
After the setting up of temporary masts, erection of the current concrete tower began in 1969. It was built over 18 months, by Tileman & Co, of Shipston-on-Stour, Warwickshire.

It was not built on the site where the original mast had stood, but slightly to the south-east at 53°36′43″N 1°39′52″W. Local residents did not wish to see another mast on Emley Moor, and a departure from usual designs was called for. The new structure consists of a tapered cylindrical pillar, 902 feet (275 m) tall, constructed of reinforced concrete, and is topped by a 180-foot (55 m) steel lattice mast which carries the antennae.

UHF (625-line colour) transmissions commenced on 21 January 1971, and the older VHF (405-line black and white) system became operational on 21 April 1971.

== Structure ==
The structure is a tapered, reinforced concrete tower. It is the tallest freestanding structure in the United Kingdom at a height of 1,084 feet (330 m), 66 feet (20 m) taller than The Shard.

Reaching the tower room at the top of the concrete structure at 900 feet (274 m) involves a seven-minute journey by lift. The antenna structure above it is a further 184 feet (56 m) tall. The mast's foundations penetrate 20 feet (6 m) into the ground, and the whole structure, including foundations, weighs 11,000 long tons (11,200 t). The consulting structural engineers were Arup.

When built, it was the third-tallest freestanding structure in Europe, after the Ostankino Tower at 1,772 feet (540 m), and the Fernsehturm Berlin (current height 1,207 feet (368 m)). The top of the tower is 1,949 feet (594 m) above sea level, due to the site's elevated position on the eastern edge of the Pennines.

The tower is not open to the public. The tower has a top-floor interior equipment area at a height of 1,083 feet (330 m), which is accessible to people.

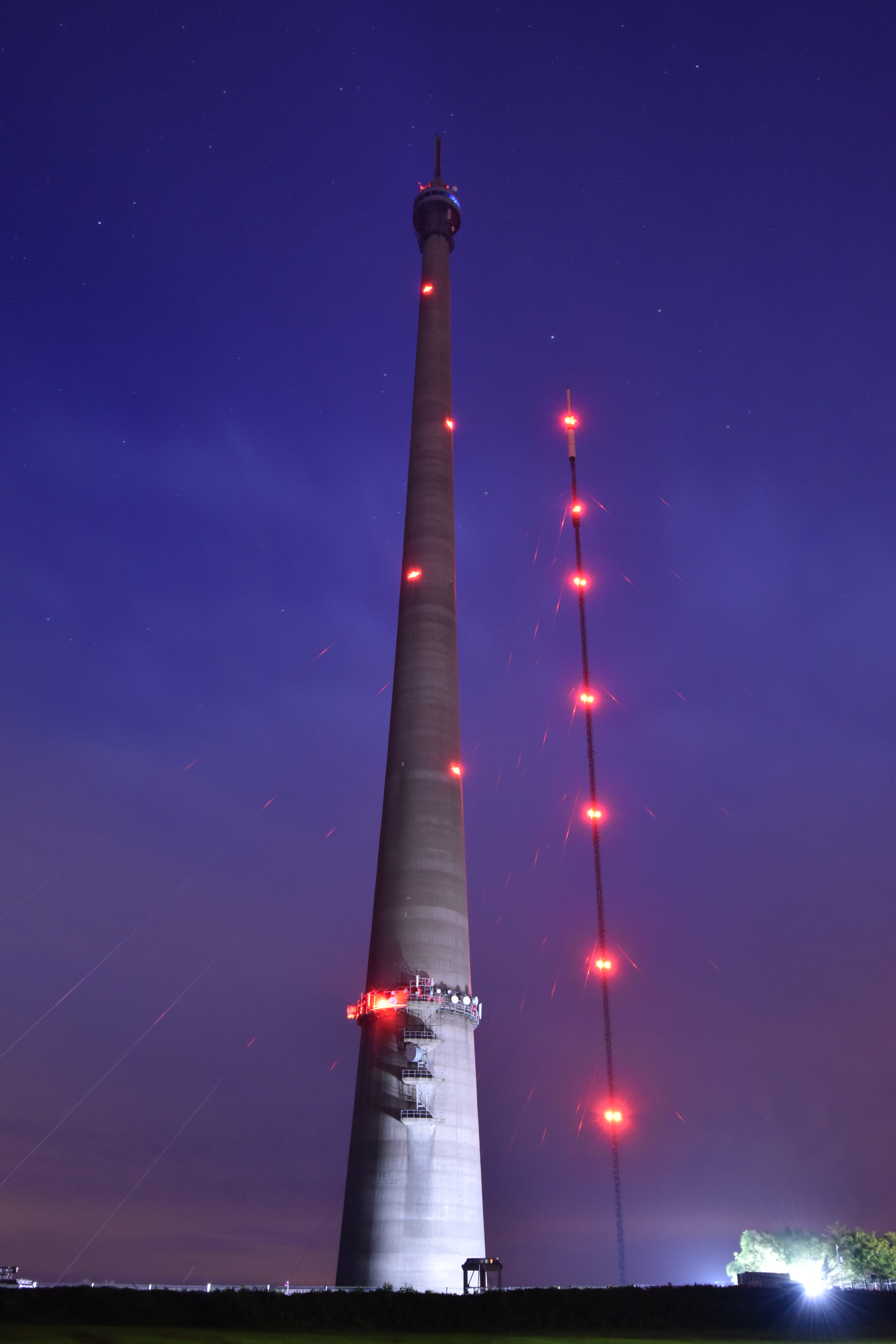
The tower at night

In 2002 English Heritage granted the tower Grade II listed building protection under UK law, being the lowest and most common of three categories, for meeting its criteria of significant architectural or historic interest.

== Ownership ==
The tower is currently owned by Arqiva, previously the Independent Broadcasting Authority Engineering section, privatised as NTL Broadcast.

== Broadcast details ==
Emley Moor tower broadcasts six digital television multiplexes, three digital radio ensembles, and two independent local radio stations (Capital Yorkshire and Heart Yorkshire), over an area of approximately 3,900 square miles (10,000 km^{2}). It is the main station for 57 relays and repeaters throughout Yorkshire and the surrounding counties. In July 2007, it was confirmed by Ofcom that Emley Moor would remain a B group transmitter after digital switchover (DSO).

The area is important for RF, radio frequency transmission, and from the foot of the structure, both Holme Moss and the Moorside Edge transmitter are visible. They are within a ten-mile (16 km) radius, and are located to the southwest and west-northwest, respectively.

Its television coverage area is one of the largest in the UK; covering most of Yorkshire and parts of the East Midlands including Leeds, Sheffield, York, Chesterfield, Worksop and Mansfield. Some transmissions can be received in Greater Manchester across the Pennines due to the height of the antenna on the tower and the powerful signal.

== Repairs and alterations ==
Over the years, the concrete structure has been updated to reflect the changing nature of communications and technology. At the top and bottom of the tower, supporting structures have been attached to accommodate dishes and aerials.

The BBC reported in July 2006 that for up to two weeks, it would broadcast analogue and digital signals at a lower power than usual, or shut down between 09:00 and 15:00 BST on weekdays from late July until 4 August, to allow aircraft warning lights to be fitted and repairs carried out. Repairs were estimated to affect around five million homes; however, a spokesperson for National Grid Wireless announced that the work had been scheduled around major events.

Digital UK reported in April 2010 that the transmitter would undergo work in preparation for the digital switchover (DSO) in 2011. Disruption to some or all Freeview services was expected to last for around two months, during which time a reserve transmitter would continue to broadcast the five main analogue channels. The work was then reported to be continuing into September due to "poor weather conditions and complex engineering issues".

In March 2018, a temporary 1,063 ft (324 m) mast was erected so that work could be undertaken on the main tower's transmitting arrays without interrupting transmissions. The temporary mast was due to be removed by the end of 2021. However, it was not until summer 2023 that work got underway to dismantle it, carried out by Turmbau Steffens & Nölle GmbH of Berlin.

== Channels listed by frequency ==
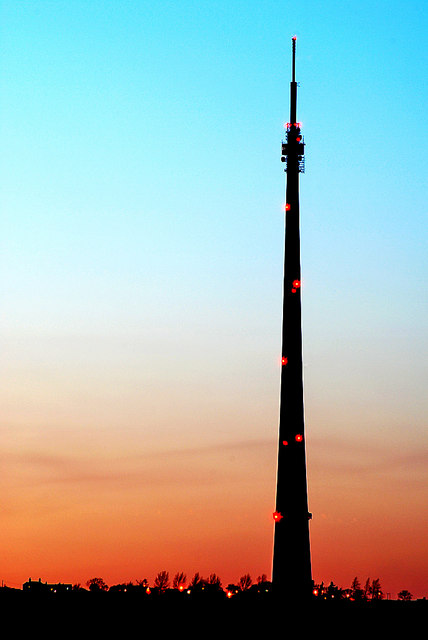
Emley Moor's distinctive tapering form on the moorland

=== Analogue radio (FM) ===
frequency	kW	service
106.2 MHz	2.35	Heart Yorkshire

=== Digital radio (DAB) ===
frequency	block	kW	operator
216.928 MHz	11A	10	Sound Digital
222.064 MHz	11D	8.5	Digital One
225.648 MHz	12B	10	BBC National DAB
229.072 MHz	12D	5	BBC Radio Leeds

=== Digital television (DVB-T/DVB-T2) ===
frequency	UHF	kW	operator	system
570.000 MHz	33	174	COM4 (SDN)	DVB-T
594.000 MHz	36	174	COM5 (ARQ A)	DVB-T
618.000 MHz	39	5	LTVmux	DVB-T
634.000 MHz	41	174	PSB3 (BBC B)	DVB-T2
658.000 MHz	44	174	PSB2 (D3&4)	DVB-T
682.000 MHz	47	174	PSB1 (BBC A)	DVB-T
690.000 MHz	48	174	COM6 (ARQ B)	DVB-T

==== Before switchover ====
frequency	UHF	kW	operator	system
618.000 MHz	39	4	BBC B (Mux HD)	DVB-T2
625.833 MHz	40-	10	Digital 3&4 (Mux 2)	DVB-T
649.833 MHz	43-	5	SDN (Mux A)	DVB-T
673.833 MHz	46-	10	BBC (Mux B)	DVB-T
697.833 MHz	49-	4	Arqiva (Mux D)	DVB-T
705.833 MHz	50-	10	Arqiva (Mux C)	DVB-T
722.166 MHz	52+	10	BBC (Mux 1)	DVB-T

=== Analogue television ===
At Emley Moor, BBC Two analogue closed on 7 September 2011, and ITV Yorkshire temporarily moved onto its frequency at the time to allow the BBC A MUX to launch in its place. The remaining four analogue services closed on 21 September 2011, when the remaining digital multiplexes were allowed to transmit with increased power.

frequency	UHF	kW	service
599.25 MHz	37	870	Channel 5
631.25 MHz	41	870	Channel 4
655.25 MHz	44	870	BBC1 Yorkshire
679.25 MHz	47	870	Yorkshire
711.25 MHz	51	870	BBC2 Yorkshire

== Relays ==
Below is a list of transmitters that relay Emley Moor.

=== Digital television ===
transmitter	kW	BBC-A	BBC-B	D3&4	SDN	ARQ-A	ARQ-B	Local	Pol.	A.G.
Addingham	0.005	43	46	40	—N/a	—N/a	—N/a	—N/a	V	B K
Armitage Bridge	0.002	32	35	34	—N/a	—N/a	—N/a	—N/a	V	A K
Batley	0.003	32	35	34	—N/a	—N/a	—N/a	—N/a	V	A K
Beecroft Hill	0.2	37	45	42	—N/a	—N/a	—N/a	39	V	B K
Blackburn in Rotherham	0.002	40	46	43	—N/a	—N/a	—N/a	—N/a	V	B K
Bradford West	0.003	39	45	42	—N/a	—N/a	—N/a	—N/a	V	B K
Brockwell	0.002	45	39	42	—N/a	—N/a	—N/a	—N/a	V	B K
Calver Peak	0.05	45	39	42	—N/a	—N/a	—N/a	—N/a	V	B K
Chesterfield	0.4 (Note: Apart from BBC A, BBC B and Digital 3&4 which transmits at 800 W.)	31	29	37	43	46	40	—N/a	V	K
Cleckheaton	0.002	29	37	31	—N/a	—N/a	—N/a	—N/a	V	A K
Conisbrough	0.002	40	46	43	—N/a	—N/a	—N/a	—N/a	V	B K
Cop Hill	0.2	25	28	22	—N/a	—N/a	—N/a	—N/a	V	A K
Copley	0.002	29	37	31	—N/a	—N/a	—N/a	—N/a	V	A K
Cornholme	0.008	32	35	34	—N/a	—N/a	—N/a	—N/a	V	A K
Cowling	0.003	42	49	45	—N/a	—N/a	—N/a	—N/a	V	B K
Cragg Vale	0.005	32	35	34	—N/a	—N/a	—N/a	—N/a	V	A K
Cullingworth	0.003	39	45	42	—N/a	—N/a	—N/a	—N/a	V	B K
Dronfield	0.002	39	45	42	—N/a	—N/a	—N/a	—N/a	V	B K
Edale	0.002	40	46	43	—N/a	—N/a	—N/a	—N/a	V	B K
Elland	0.002	32	35	34	—N/a	—N/a	—N/a	—N/a	V	B K
Grassington	0.012	23	26	30	—N/a	—N/a	—N/a	—N/a	V	A K
Hagg Wood	0.007	39	45	42	—N/a	—N/a	—N/a	—N/a	V	B K
Halifax	0.1	24	27	21+	—N/a	—N/a	—N/a	—N/a	V	A K
Hasland	0.002	32	35	34	—N/a	—N/a	—N/a	—N/a	V	A K
Headingley	0.002	32	35	34	—N/a	—N/a	—N/a	—N/a	V	A K
Hebden Bridge	0.05	25	28	22	—N/a	—N/a	—N/a	—N/a	V	A K
Heyshaw	0.1	39	45	42	—N/a	—N/a	—N/a	—N/a	V	B K
Holmfield	0.004	29	37	31	—N/a	—N/a	—N/a	—N/a	V	A K
Holmfirth	0.005	32	35	34	—N/a	—N/a	—N/a	—N/a	V	A K
Hope	0.002	28	25	22	—N/a	—N/a	—N/a	—N/a	V	A K
Idle	0.05	23	30	26	32	35	34	—N/a	V	A K
Keighley	2	40	46	43	29	31	37	—N/a	V	K
Keighley Town	0.002	23	29	26	—N/a	—N/a	—N/a	—N/a	V	A K
Kettlewell	0.026	42	39	45	—N/a	—N/a	—N/a	—N/a	V	B K
Longwood Edge	0.008	29	37	31	—N/a	—N/a	—N/a	—N/a	H	A K
Luddenden	0.012	40	46	43	—N/a	—N/a	—N/a	—N/a	V	B K
Lydgate	0.002	21	27	24	—N/a	—N/a	—N/a	—N/a	V	A K
Millhouse Green	0.002	32	35	34	—N/a	—N/a	—N/a	—N/a	V	A K
Oughtibridge	0.008	23	30	26	—N/a	—N/a	—N/a	—N/a	V	A K
Oxenhope	0.04	25	28	22	—N/a	—N/a	—N/a	—N/a	V	A K
Primrose Hill	0.006	40	46	43	—N/a	—N/a	—N/a	—N/a	V	B K
Ripponden	0.012	32	35	34	—N/a	—N/a	—N/a	—N/a	V	A K
Shatton Edge	0.2	32	35	34	—N/a	—N/a	—N/a	—N/a	V	A K
Sheffield	1 (Note: Apart from Local Multiplex which transmits at 400 W.)	27	21+	24	42	45	39	35	V	K
Skipton	2	49	42	45	—N/a	—N/a	—N/a	—N/a	V	B E
Skipton Town	0.003	24	21+	27	—N/a	—N/a	—N/a	—N/a	V	A K
Stocksbridge	0.002	40	46	43	—N/a	—N/a	—N/a	—N/a	V	B K
Sutton-in-Craven	0.002	23	30	26	—N/a	—N/a	—N/a	—N/a	V	A K
Tideswell Moor	0.05	40	46	43	—N/a	—N/a	—N/a	—N/a	V	B K
Todmorden	0.1	39	42	45	—N/a	—N/a	—N/a	—N/a	V	B K
Totley Rise	0.016	33	48	36	—N/a	—N/a	—N/a	—N/a	V	A K
Walsden	0.01	40	46	43	—N/a	—N/a	—N/a	—N/a	V	B K
Walsden South	0.002	32	35	34	—N/a	—N/a	—N/a	—N/a	V	A K
Wharfedale	0.4	25	28	22	—N/a	—N/a	—N/a	—N/a	V	A K
Wheatley	0.3	32	35	34	—N/a	—N/a	—N/a	—N/a	V	A K
Wincobank	0.002	29	37	31	—N/a	—N/a	—N/a	—N/a	V	A K

== Other structures of comparable height ==
Taller structures

- It is shorter than Skelton transmitting station in Cumbria, a guyed mast, which at 1,198 feet (365 m) is the tallest structure (of any kind) in the United Kingdom.
  - Skelton is comparable to the:
    - Gerbrandy Tower, partially guyed, between IJsselstein and Lopik in the Netherlands at 1,204 feet (366.9 m);
    - Torreta de Guardamar, guyed, in Spain at 1,214 feet (370 m).
- The Ostankino Tower, in Moscow, is the tallest freestanding structure in Europe, at 1,772 feet (540 m).
- The Kyiv TV Tower is the next-tallest freestanding structure in Europe at 1,263 feet (385 m).
- The Riga radio and TV tower follows at 1,209 feet (368.5 m).

Smaller structures

- It is 66 feet (20 m) taller than The Shard in London, which is the next-tallest freestanding structure in the United Kingdom;
- It is 135 feet (41 m) taller than 22 Bishopsgate in London, the UK's second-tallest building;
- It is 312 feet (95 m) taller than One Canada Square by Canary Wharf, London, the UK's third-tallest building;
- Sint-Pieters-Leeuw Tower in Belgium is 991 feet (302 m);
- The Eiffel Tower in Paris, France is 984 feet (300 m), plus a 79-foot (24 m) antenna.

== See also ==
- List of catastrophic collapses of radio masts and towers
- List of masts
- List of radio stations in the United Kingdom
- List of tallest buildings and structures in Great Britain
- List of tallest freestanding structures in the world
- List of towers
- Listed buildings in Denby Dale
- Radio masts and towers
- Telecommunications in the United Kingdom
