= Lower Cumberworth =

Village in West Yorkshire, England

Coordinates: 53.577°N 1.673°W

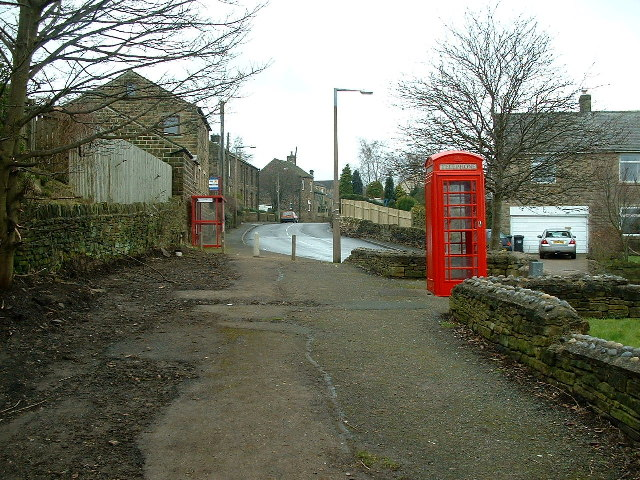
Bus stop in Lower Cumberworth

Lower Cumberworth is a village in the borough of Kirklees, West Yorkshire, England. The village is 9 miles (14 km) from Barnsley and 9 miles (14 km) from Huddersfield.

The civil parish of Denby Dale covers the village. The parish council gave the population of the villages of Upper and Lower Cumberworth as 1,222 in the 2001 Census.

Historically, Lower Cumberworth is part of the West Riding of Yorkshire in the Wapentake of Staincross and formerly of the ancient parish of High Hoyland. The Wapentake almost corresponds with the current Barnsley Metropolitan Area, although a few settlements and townships within the Staincross Wapentake such as Lower Cumberworth were put outside the Metropolitan Borough of Barnsley and now lie within the current West Yorkshire Metropolitan Area since April 1974.

The name Cumberworth derives from the Old English Cumbreworð meaning 'Cumbre's enclosure' or 'the enclosure of the Cumbrians'.

== The village ==
The village consists of around 200 homes. It has a cricket ground that is home to Cumberworth United Cricket Club They play in the Huddersfield Cricket League.

The village also has a public house called "The Foresters Arms" and there is also the Lower Cumberworth Methodist Church.

The Cumberworth Community Association is open to all residents and aims to improve the facilities of the local area by raising money via local events.

== See also ==
- Listed buildings in Denby Dale
