= A636 road =

Road in West Yorkshire, England

A636

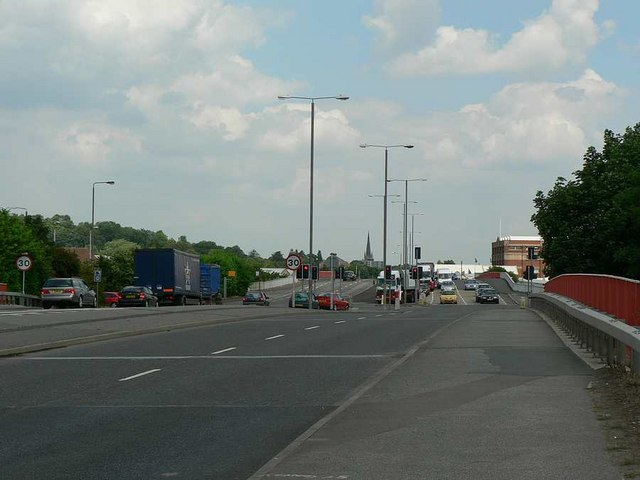
- Crossing the River Calder as Denby Dale Road near Thornes, Wakefield

Major junctions
- East end: Wakefield
- West end: Denby Dale

Location
- Country: United Kingdom
- Primary destinations: Flockton, Durkar, Crigglestone

Road network
- Roads in the United Kingdom; Motorways; A and B road zones

The A636 is a main road in West Yorkshire, England, starting at Wakefield (53.6788°N 1.5002°W) and connecting with the M1 motorway at junction 39 and with the A637 at Flockton roundabout. It ends at the A635 at Denby Dale (53.5705°N 1.6704°W).
