= Denby Dale =

Village and civil parish in West Yorkshire, England

Coordinates: 53.572000°N 1.655000°W

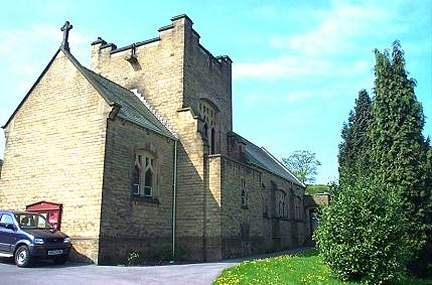
- Holy Trinity Church

- Location within West Yorkshire
- Population: 16,365 (2011 Census)
- OS grid reference: SE229084
- Civil parish: Denby Dale
- Metropolitan borough: Kirklees
- Metropolitan county: West Yorkshire
- Region: Yorkshire and the Humber
- Country: England
- Sovereign state: United Kingdom
- Post town: HUDDERSFIELD
- Postcode district: HD8
- Dialling code: 01484
- Police: West Yorkshire
- Fire: West Yorkshire
- Ambulance: Yorkshire
- UK Parliament: Ossett and Denby Dale

Denby Dale is a village and civil parish in the metropolitan borough of Kirklees in West Yorkshire, England. It is 8 miles north-west of Barnsley and 10 miles south-east of Huddersfield.

The village is the main village in the Denby Dale civil parish that also covers Lower Denby, Upper Denby, Upper Cumberworth, Lower Cumberworth, Skelmanthorpe, Emley, Emley Moor and Clayton West. The parish had a population of 14,982 according to the 2001 census, increasing to 16,365 at the 2011 census. The parish council gives the electorate of the village itself as 2,143. The River Dearne runs through the village; in the floods of 2007 it burst its banks on two occasions and caused damage to Springfield Mill.

== History ==
Historically Denby Dale is part of the West Riding of Yorkshire in the Wapentake of Staincross. The Wapentake almost corresponds with the current Barnsley Metropolitan Area, although a few settlements and townships within the Staincross Wapentake such as Denby Dale were put outside the Metropolitan Borough of Barnsley and now lie within the current West Yorkshire Metropolitan Area since April 1974.

First recorded as Denby Dyke, before the Industrial Revolution the village was sparsely populated with a small textile industry at the crossroads of the Barnsley to Shepley Lane Head and the Wakefield to Denby Dale roads. Within 25 years, factories and mills had been built and had a railway station on the Penistone Line. Denby Dale provided the textile industry with raw materials, coal, and transportation. Silk for the Queen Mother's wedding dress was made at Springfield Mill. With the economy flourishing, the population increased and the village grew.

In 1674, the Denby Petition, created by Nathan Staniforth, then headteacher of Penistone Grammar School, was signed by over 50 residents of Denby, in defence of Susanna Hinchcliffe and Anne Shillitoe against charges of witchcraft.

== Transport ==
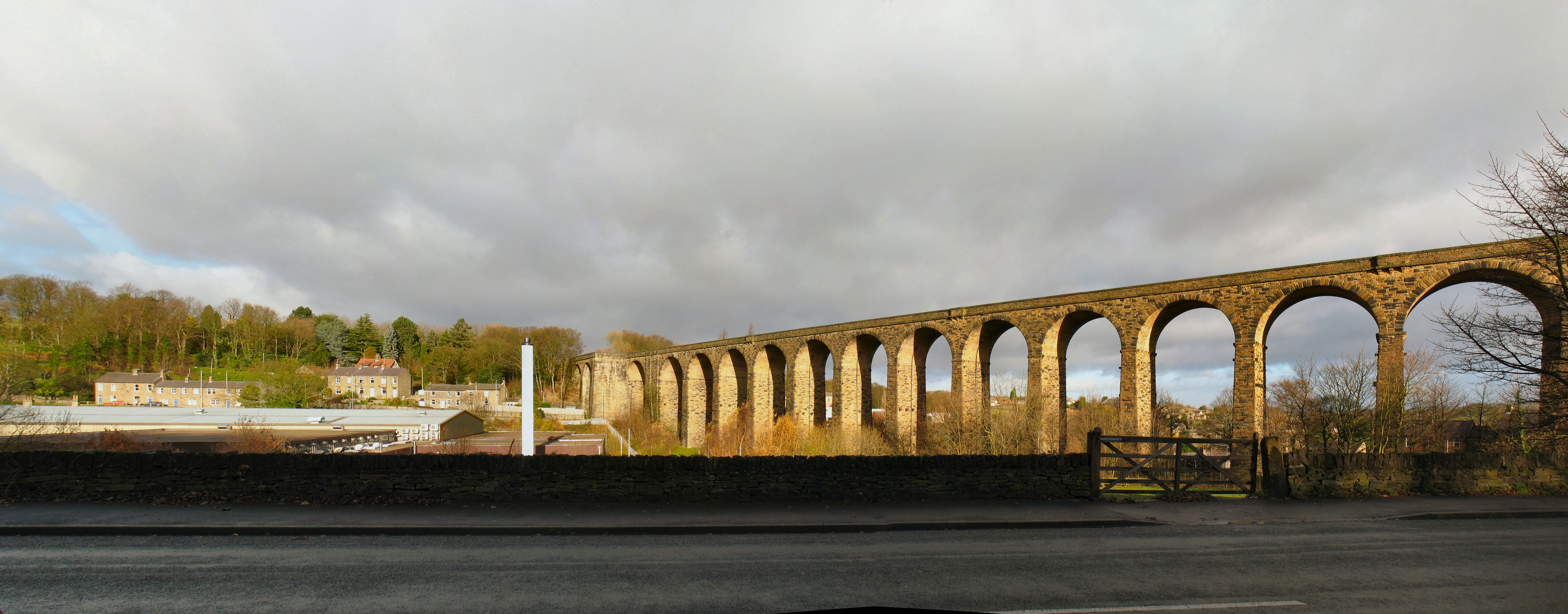
Denby Dale Viaduct

The village is served by Denby Dale railway station, and also has 2 bus stops. The D1 Denby Darts bus service runs to Skelmanthorpe and Huddersfield.

== Education ==
Denby Dale First and Nursery school (formerly known as Gilthwaites First School and Denby Dale Nursery) provides education from aged 2 to aged 10.

Denby Church of England Voluntary Aided First School is a voluntary aided primary school associated with the Church of England in Upper Denby. The school has two classes, infants and juniors, with the infants running through years reception to year 2 and the juniors running through the years 3 to 5. At the turn of the millennium, there were around 40 to 50 pupils in the school.

== Pies ==
Denby Dale has a tradition of baking giant pies, which started in 1788 to celebrate the recovery of King George III from mental illness. To date ten pies have been made as part of nine pie festivals. In August 1887, a pie baked to celebrate the Golden Jubilee of Queen Victoria spoiled and was buried in quicklime. A replacement pie (the 'resurrection' pie) was baked in September 1887. The sixth pie was baked on 1 August 1896, to celebrate the 50th anniversary of the repeal of the corn laws. The seventh (the Infirmary Pie) raised money to endow a cot at Huddersfield Royal Infirmary. The eighth pie, in 1964, was to celebrate four royal births but was marred by the deaths of four committee members in a car accident while returning from filming in London for a pilot of a television show (later to become the Eamonn Andrews Show). The eighth pie raised money to provide a village hall. The most recent in 2000, weighed 12 tonnes (13 tons) and celebrated the new millennium. Denby Dale Pies was founded in the village. In 1940 it was agreed by the Denby Dale Local Comforts Fund, the giant pie dish would be sold for scrap to help the war effort. There was a procession, cricket match, dancing all followed by the selling of the dish.

== Notable people ==
- Paul Copley, actor
- Daniel Kitson, comedian

== See also ==
- Listed buildings in Denby Dale
