= Clayton West branch line =

Former railway line in Yorkshire, England

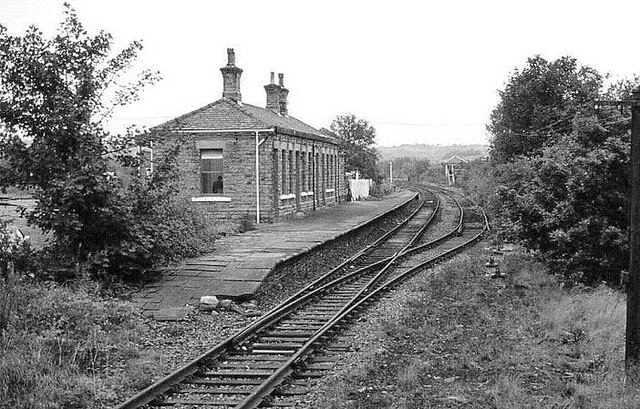
- Clayton West railway station

Overview
- Locale: Kirklees, West Yorkshire, England
- Coordinates: 53.594°N 1.635°W
- Termini: Clayton West Junction; Clayton West railway station
- Stations: 2

Service
- Type: Heavy rail
- Operator(s): Lancashire and Yorkshire Railway (1879–1922); London and North Western Railway (1922–1923); London, Midland and Scottish Railway (1923–1948); British Railways (1948–1983)
- Daily ridership: 50 (average per day in 1982)

History
- Opened: 1 September 1879
- Closed: (To passengers) 24 January 1983 (To freight) October 1983

Technical
- Line length: 3.5 mi (5.6 km)
- Number of tracks: 1
- Track gauge: 4 ft 8 1/2 in (1,435 mm) standard gauge

The Clayton West branch line was a standard gauge passenger and freight railway near Huddersfield, in West Yorkshire, England. The line was built by the Lancashire and Yorkshire Railway, opening to traffic in September 1879. Many proposals were considered to extending the line eastwards towards Darton, and then connecting to Barnsley, but these never came to fruition. In 1963, both stations on the line, (Clayton West and Skelmanthorpe), were listed for closure under the Beeching cuts, but the branch survived as a passenger carrying railway until 1983. The branch also forwarded coal from two collieries adjacent to the line, which maintained a freight service on the branch up until closure.

== History ==
A railway between Huddersfield and Penistone (now known as the Penistone line), was opened by the Lancashire and Yorkshire Railway (L&YR) in July 1850. The original Act of Parliament was granted to the Huddersfield and Sheffield Junction Railway (H&SJR), which became part of the L&YR in 1847. The first notion of a branch to Clayton West came about when detailed plans to build a branch from Denby Dale, on the Penistone line, eastwards to the Midland line at Darfield, were unveiled by the H&SJR in 1845. Then, in 1863, the Midland Railway proposed building a line between Barnsley and Huddersfield along the existing LNWR Kirkburton Branch, which would have passed through Clayton West at a right-angle to the eventual Clayton West Branch. At first the LNWR were resistant, but finally agreed to the plan under pressure which caused some concern for the L&YR.

The L&YR dissuaded the Midland by offering running powers over their route through Penistone, and an act was passed in June 1866 allowing the L&YR to construct a branch from Shepley to Clayton West, at a cost of £75,000 (equivalent to £8,776,000 in 2023). (Note: A report three years later (1869) stated the cost to be £112,000, (equivalent to £13,068,000 in 2023).) However, the L&YR did not build the line quickly, the first sod was not cut until November 1872. A report from 1869 detailed how carts were carrying goods traffic along the proposed course of the branch to Shepley station. One traffic manager of the L&YR stated that the cost of trafficking the goods by train would doubtless increase when the branch was built. Up to 150 men were employed to build the line, and as a result of disturbances between the navvies and locals in Skelmanthorpe, a "supernumerary police constable" was employed there. The line finally opened to traffic on 1 September 1879, though Skelmanthorpe station was not opened until three months later on 1 December 1879. Whilst Skelmanthorpe station was largely constructed of timber, Clayton West was built from local stone. The building of the line through Skelmanthorpe required a tunnel and a cutting. Local people were employed to shatter the rocks, which led to them being labelled Shatterers, which later was shortened to Shatter and then Shat.

Some consideration was given to extending the line beyond the terminus at Clayton West, it would head towards Haigh (a small village to the east), which would then connect to the line between Wakefield and Barnsley, as per the original H&SJR plans of 1845. This idea, along with the widening of the branch to accommodate two tracks, was pursued through Parliament in 1893, but came to nothing, and the branch remained only 3 1/2 miles (5.6 km) long and largely single track. The 1893 proposal was to connect with the Barnsley line at Darton, however, one of the reasons this venture failed was due to the building of the Horbury fork, a triangular junction which allowed trains to connect Barnsley to Huddersfield without using the Penistone line. At a meeting of the Huddersfield Chamber of Commerce in June 1898, the L&YR gave official notice that they had abandoned the idea of extending the branch as they could see no justification for the expense in comparison to expected traffic the line would generate.

The engineering for the line was relatively simple, with only one major structure, the 511-yard (467 m) tunnel at Shelley Woodhouse, which required the removal of 675,000 cubic yards (516,000 m^{3}) of earth and rock. Although the line (and the tunnel) had been built to accommodate two tracks, only the first 1 1/4 miles (2.0 km) were left as so (at least until 1959). The branch was 3 1/2 miles (5.6 km) in length with Skelmanthorpe station being some 9 1/2 miles (15.3 km) down the line from Huddersfield, and Clayton West 11 1/4 miles (18.1 km). The branch left the junction of the Penistone line falling on a gradient of 1 in 63 (15.9 ‰), up until it was just west of the terminus, where the gradient shifted to an uphill of 1 in 260 (3.8 ‰). The line was owned and operated by the L&YR for 43 years from opening until 1922, when the L&YR amalgamated with the London and North Western Railway (LNWR). A year later, the LNWR became part of the London Midland Scottish (LMS), and was nationalised into British Rail in 1948.

Besides passenger services, the line forwarded coal from two locations; Emley Moor Colliery, which was just north of Skelmanthorpe station, with its own railway connection, and Park Mill Colliery at Clayton West. The Park Mill Colliery was to the north of the station and had a loader just south of the station building itself, with a 2-foot-6-inch (0.76 m) tramway connecting the two locations. In the 1970s and the 1980s, coal traffic on the branch line was worked by a single engine direct to Clayton West to exchange empty wagons for loaded ones, and on the return, the locomotive would shunt the small branch at Emley Moor Colliery. Sidings were provided on either side of the main line at Clayton West Junction for storing loaded and empty wagons to and from the branch.

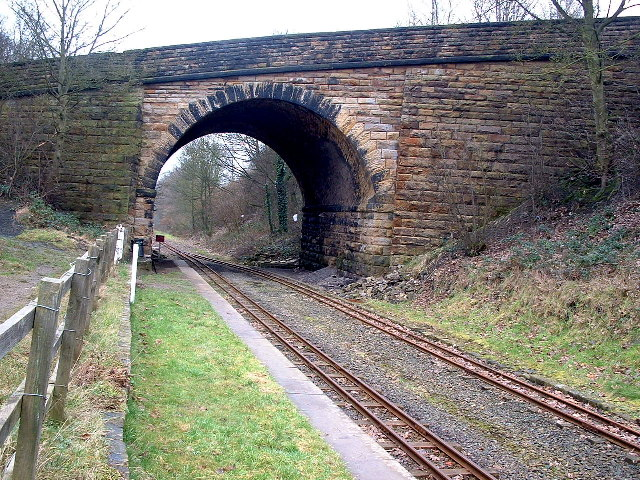
Skelmanthorpe Station looking east, with the narrow gauge tracks in place.

In March 1963, both stations on the line (Clayton West and Skelmanthorpe), were listed for closure under the Beeching proposals. However, in April 1966, the Minister of Transport (Barbara Castle), reprieved the line (along with the whole line south from Huddersfield to Sheffield, which was also scheduled for closure). Part of the reason for the reprieve was the coal traffic on the branch, which in the 1970s and 1980s, represented the only freight traffic on the Penistone Line. However, the main cause for not closing the line was that schoolchildren used the service to get to a school in Honley. By the time of the second closure proposal, a new school had been built in Clayton West.

One proposal to save the line was to use the cheaper railbus trains that were being introduced in the early 1980s. Steam trains had last been used on the line in 1959, with diesel multiple units taking over in November 1959. The Central Transport Consultative Committee recommended that the Clayton West Branch be converted to the railbus type in 1981, however, in its final years, the branch only had a patronage of 50 people per day. The final passenger trains along the branch ran on 22 January 1983; the unwillingness of the West Yorkshire Passenger Transport Executive to support the line financially in the face of low passenger numbers, meant closure for the line to passengers two days later, on 24 January 1983. However, some non-passenger trains ran along the branch at a later date, notably the weedkiller train, which ran in May 1983, but this was to aid in the recovery of track. The section of track from Emley Moor to Clayton West Junction (at Shepley) remained in use for coal being transhipped to Elland Power Station. (Note: Emley Moor closed in December 1985 with exhausted reserves; it had employed 220 people.) Both collieries stopped sending coal out via the line in 1983. The branch was locked out of use at Clayton West Junction in September 1983, and officially closed in October of 1983. Tracklifting was completed in 1986. A survey conducted during the second closure proposals stated that 59% of respondents would use public transport (bus) after closure of the line.

The trackbed was re-opened in stages from 1991 onwards as the Kirklees Light railway, operating a 15-inch (380 mm) gauge railway. Its name was changed to the Whistlestop Valley in 2021 as a rebranding.

== Services ==
In 1880, services to Clayton West numbered five a day, with most terminating and originating at Brockholes. The branch did not receive a Sunday service. In 1882, the timetable shows five outbound workings from Huddersfield, but only four returning as passenger services. By 1898, eight services operated on the line, with an early morning working from Huddersfield only stopping at Shepley and the two stations on the branch. The final L&YR timetable from 1922, showed nine daily services out and back, with ten on a Saturday.

The timetables for 1944 and 1946, under the LMS, show six workings to Clayton West, with extras on Saturdays, again with no Sunday service. Most originated at Huddersfield, with some in the afternoons starting at Bradford Exchange.

By 1982, services had been curtailed to only five to Huddersfield, and four south to Clayton West.
