= Whistlestop Valley =

Narrow gauge heritage railway in West Yorkshire, England

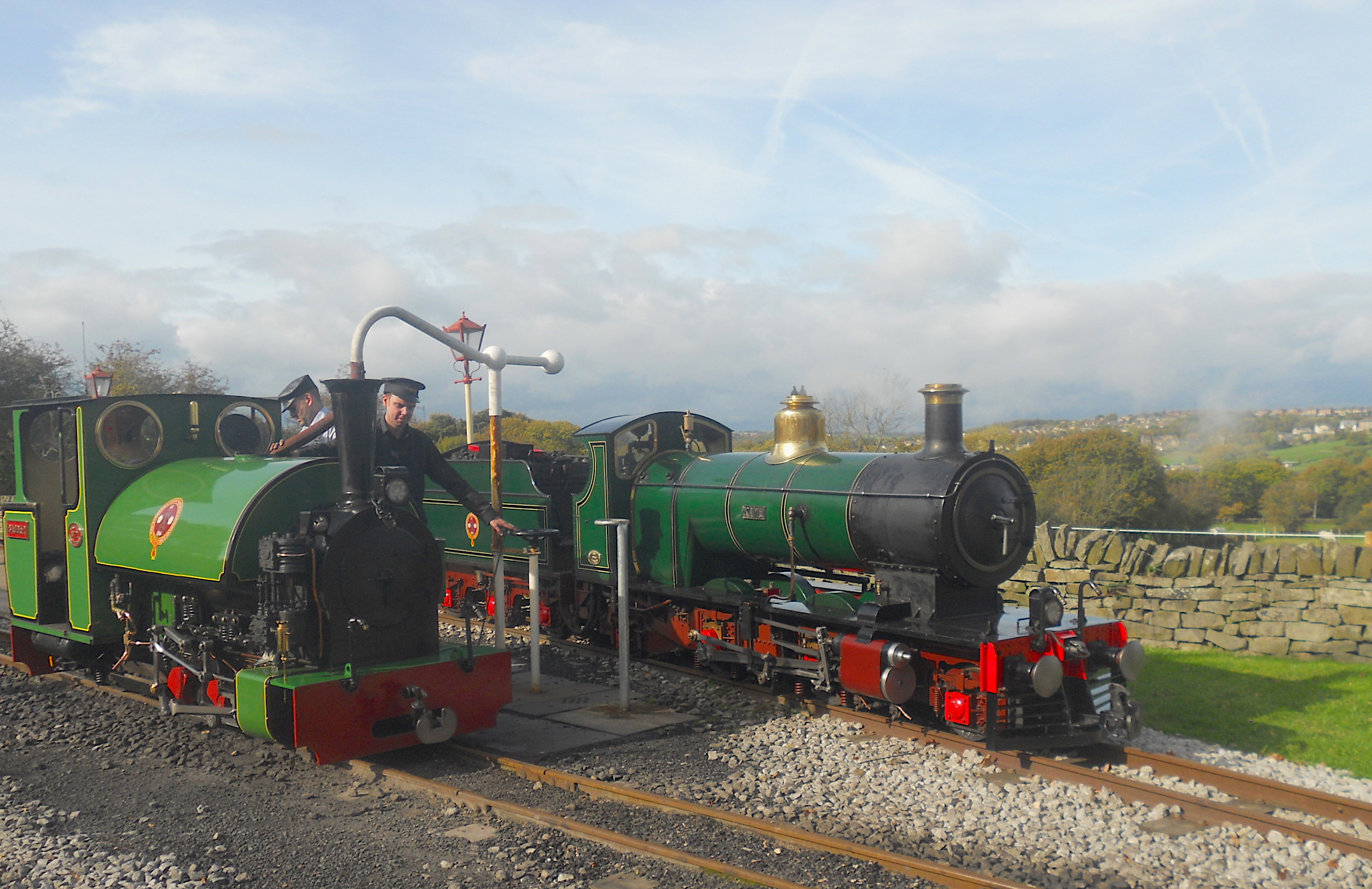
- Both 0-6-2ST Badger and 2-4-2 Katie at Shelley Woodhouse
- Locale: West Yorkshire, England
- Terminus: Clayton West
- Coordinates: 53.597°N 1.612°W

Commercial operations
- Name: Lancashire & Yorkshire Railway Clayton West branch
- Built by: Lancashire & Yorkshire Railway
- Original gauge: 4 ft 8 1/2 in (1,435 mm) standard gauge

Preserved operations
- Length: 3 1/2 miles (5.6 km)
- Preserved gauge: 15 in (381 mm)

Commercial history
- Opened: 1 September 1879
- Closed: 24 January 1983

Preservation history
- 19 October 1991: opened
- 26 December 1992: extended to Skelmanthorpe
- May 1997: extended to Shelley Woodhouse

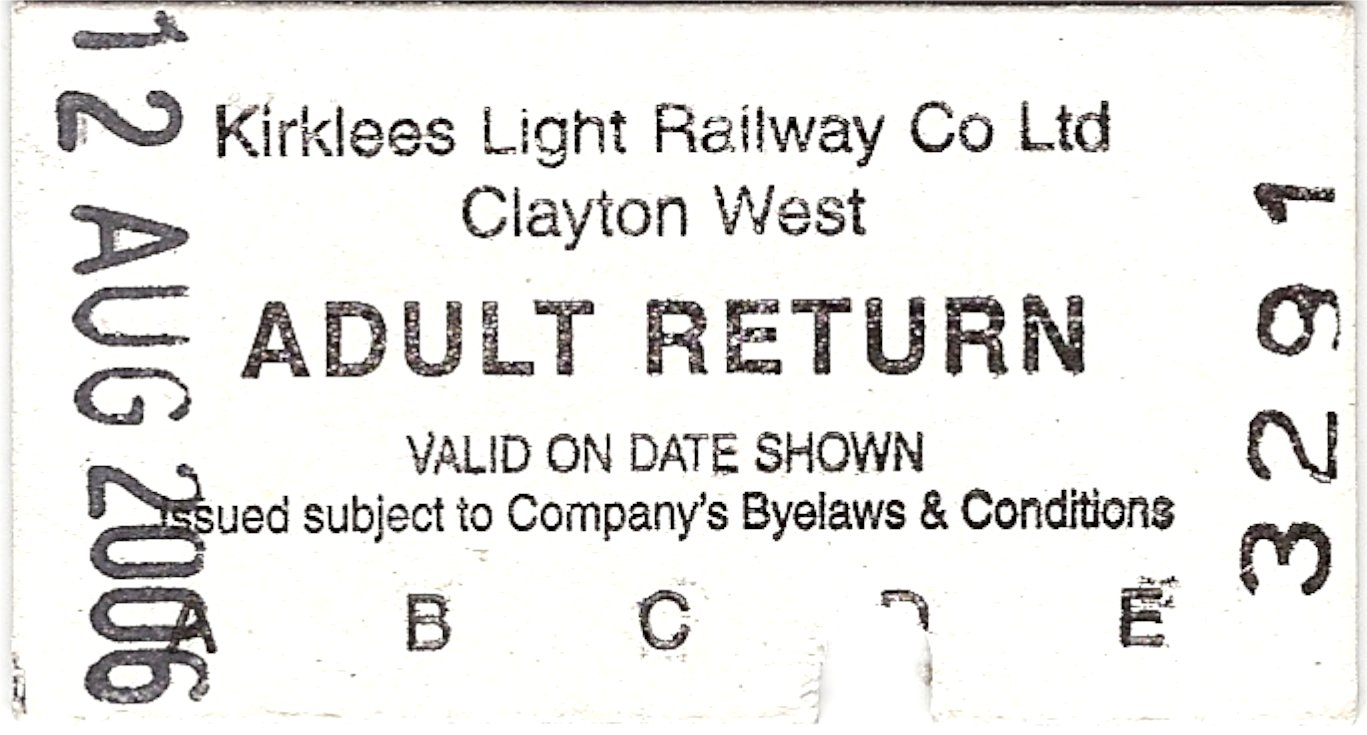
KLR Adult return ticket

Whistlestop Valley, formerly the Kirklees Light Railway, is a visitor attraction featuring a 3 1/2-mile (5.6 km) long 15 in (381 mm) gauge minimum-gauge railway. The attraction's main site is in the village of Clayton West in Kirklees, West Yorkshire, England, which was first opened to the public on 19 October 1991, with a second, smaller site in a rural area near the village of Shelley.

The railway at Whistlestop Valley runs along the trackbed of the Lancashire & Yorkshire Railway's former branch line, from Clayton West via Skelmanthorpe to Shelley Woodhouse (a few yards close to the former Clayton West Junction 1/2 mile (0.8 km), near Shepley) on the Penistone line from Huddersfield to Sheffield via Penistone and Barnsley.

From 1991 to 2021 the attraction was known as the Kirklees Light Railway. In June 2021, the attraction was rebranded under the name Whistlestop Valley but retains the name Kirklees Light Railway for its 15-inch railway operation.

== History ==
The Lancashire and Yorkshire Railway opened a branch line from Clayton West Junction to Clayton West on 1 September 1879. The branch line was built with bridges, tunnels and earthworks suitable for a double line in case of a proposed extension to reach Darton on the Dewsbury to Barnsley Line, but only one line was ever laid and despite attempts to extend the railway, Clayton West was to remain as a terminus.

The line survived the Beeching cuts, in large part thanks to the mineral traffic generated by the collieries at the terminus (Park Mill) and at Skelmanthorpe (Emley Moor), but was not adopted by the West Yorkshire Passenger Transport Executive unlike nearly all other passenger lines in West Yorkshire and was closed to passengers on 24 January 1983. Coal was still transhipped from Emley Moor Colliery to Elland Power Station until 1984 and tracklifting of the branch was completed in 1986.

Construction of the minimum-gauge railway started in mid-summer 1990, following a joint application for a light railway order between Kirklees Council and the Kirklees Light Railway Company on 22 February 1989. Construction was aided significantly by the amount of redundant materials available from a number of collieries in the area which were slowly beginning to end their mining operations. The Kirklees Light Railway Order 1991 was finally granted on 27 September 1991.

The line was originally 1 mile (1.6 km) in length running from Clayton West to a specially constructed halt called Cuckoos Nest. This name is historic to 15-inch–gauge railways: a station on the Eaton Hall Railway, near Chester, built by Arthur Heywood, bore the name. Trains to Cuckoo's Nest commenced running on Saturday 19 October 1991. The KLR was later extended to Skelmanthorpe in 1992 and again to Shelley Woodhouse in 1996/97 with a grant from the European Regional Development Fund for the regeneration of coal mining areas.

The journey gives fine views of the Grade II listed Emley Moor transmitting station, passes through the ancient woodland of Blacker Wood which is mentioned in the Domesday Book and includes a trip through the 511 yards (467 m) long Shelley Woodhouse Tunnel, the longest tunnel on any 15 in (381 mm) gauge line in Britain.

The original line as built was 3 1/2 miles (5.6 km), but upon reopening as the Kirklees Light Railway, the line is short of the former Clayton West Junction on the Penistone Line and the length of the light railway is 3.04 miles (4.89 km).

== Operations ==
The attraction is usually closed during January for winter maintenance. The attraction is open to the public on most weekends, bank holidays and daily during local school holidays from February to November. Winter opening is usually Christmas themed with options including Santa Special trains (involving train rides and an encounter with Santa Claus).

== Stations ==
- Clayton West
- Cuckoos Nest halt
- Skelmanthorpe
- Shelley Woodhouse

== Locomotives ==
Many of the locomotives used on the railway were built by the railway's founder Brian Taylor, with subsequent application of modern steam principles advocated by Livio Dante Porta. These modifications have improved the locomotives' performance, reliability and efficiency. The line has also acquired some older locomotives, constructed by Guest Engineering.

=== Steam locomotives ===
The following are approximately half size narrow-gauge locomotives:

Name	Design	Type	Date	Notes
Fox	Hunslet	2-6-2T	1987	Fox recently finished a lengthy and large overhaul which took 5 years. Based on a 2-6-4T built by the Hunslet Engine Company for export to India.
Badger	Kerr, Stuart & Company	0-6-4ST	1991	A freelance locomotive with leanings to Kerr Stuarts Tattoo Class contractors locomotives. Perhaps best described as what the NWNGR's locomotive Beddgelert might have looked like if Kerr Stuart had built it!
Hawk	Kitson Meyer	0-4-0+0-4-0T	1998	In traffic for weekend services and special events. Based on a 2 ft 5 in (737 mm) gauge Kitson Meyer built by Andrew Barclay Sons & Co for export to Chile.
Owl	Avonside Engine Company/Heisler locomotive	0-4-0+0-4-0TG	2000	In traffic for weekend services and special events.
Katie	Ernest Twining design, built by Guest Engineering	2-4-2	1954	Bought by the KLR in 2015.
Siân	Ernest Twining design, built by Guest Engineering	2-4-2	1963	Sister engine to Katie, built for the Fairbourne Railway. Has operated on the KLR since 2018 but owned by the Siân Project Group.

=== Diesel locomotive ===
- 0-4-0DH Jay built in 1992, and was constructed around a 1947 vintage Dorman 2DL engine that had previously been used in one of the famous Hudswell Clarke steam outline locomotives used on the Pleasure Beach Express at Blackpool Pleasure Beach. In 2002 the locomotive was rebuilt with a slightly different body outline, and the engine was replaced with a Ford 4D 4-cylinder diesel engine. In 2008 the locomotive received a further engine changed when it was fitted with a new Kubota 4-cylinder engine, its first new engine since it was built. Jay is probably the hardest-working engine on the line, as it is used a lot to shunt stock; it is also used occasionally on passenger trains.

=== Petrol locomotive ===
- No 7 The Tram built in 1991. This locomotive was originally constructed was a 2w-2PH platelayers' trolley. It was subsequently fitted with a steam outline body based on the J70 tram engines built by the Great Eastern Railway. It was originally fitted with an engine from an invalid car, though at the present, June 2009, a new small Kubota diesel engine is due to be fitted. It is predominantly used at special events (mainly Day Out with Thomas) giving rides to children.

== Gallery ==
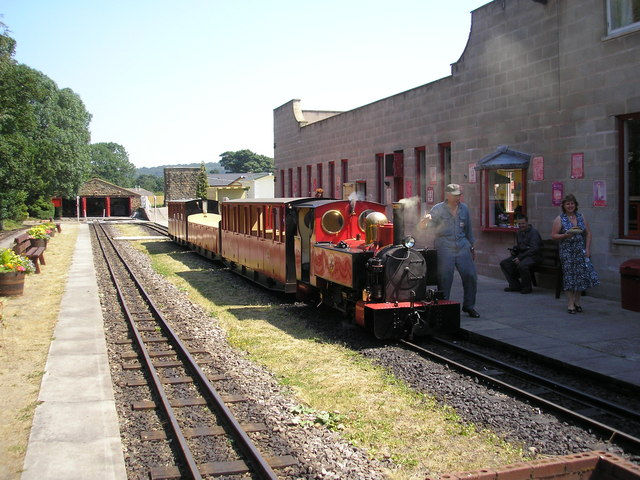
Kirklees Light Railway 2-6-2T No. 1 'Fox' at the head of a train at Clayton West.

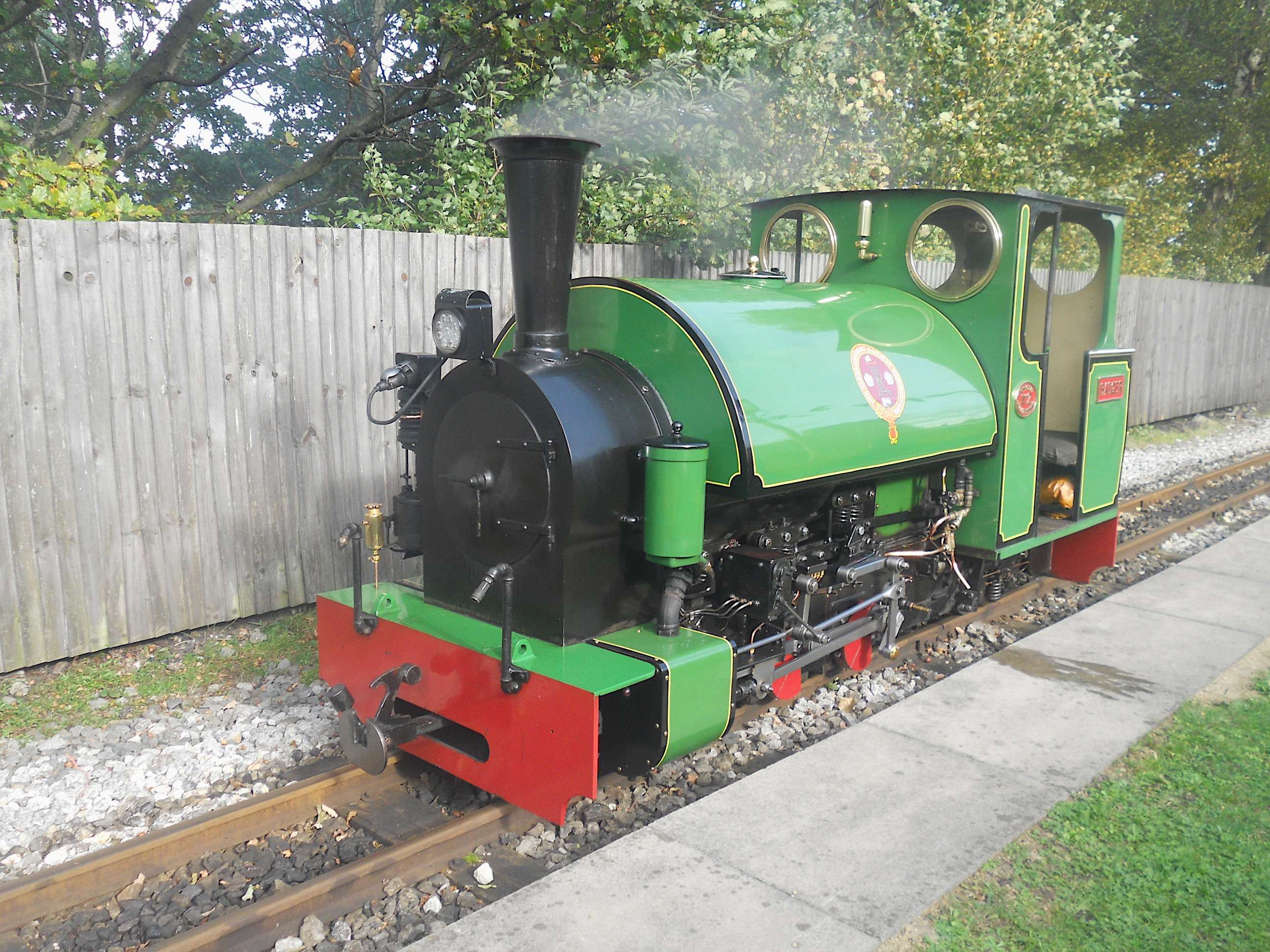
Kirklees Light Railway 0-6-2ST No. 2 'Badger' at Clayton West.

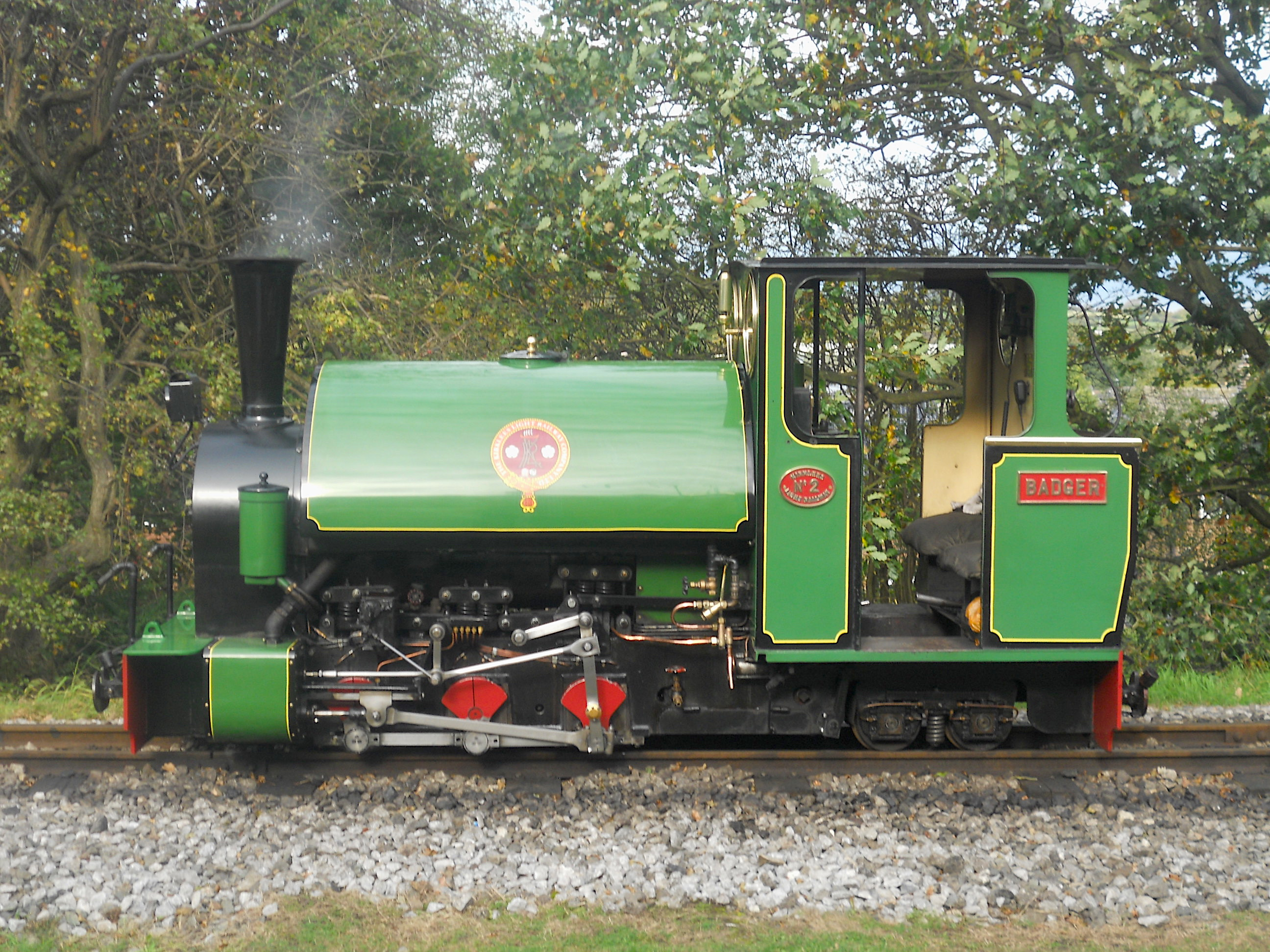
A side view of Kirklees Light Railway 0-6-2ST No. 2 'Badger' at Clayton West.

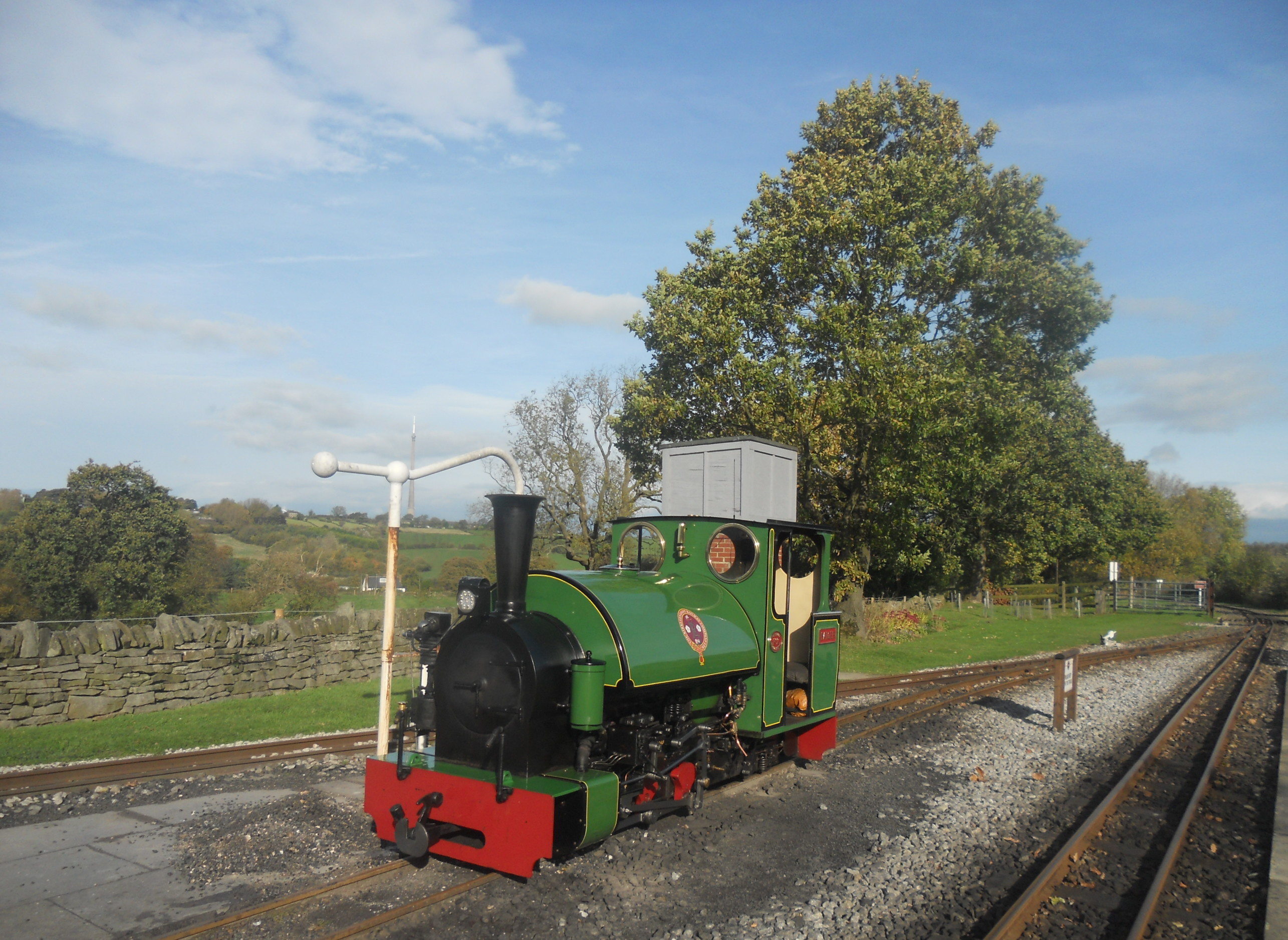
Kirklees Light Railway 0-6-2ST No. 2 'Badger' at Shelley.

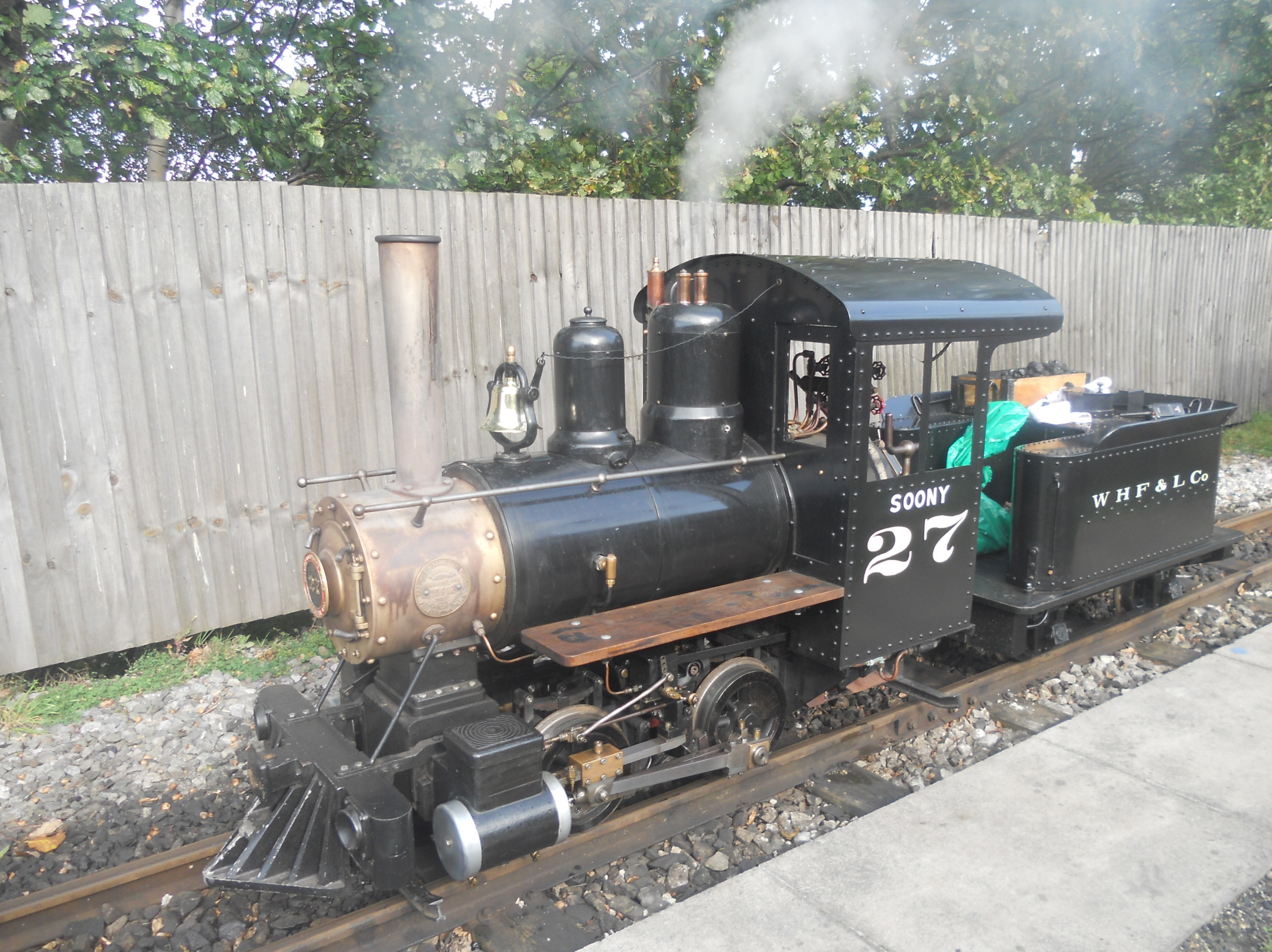
Visiting from Perrygrove Railway is this American 0-4-0 No. 27 'Soony' and is seen at Clayton West.

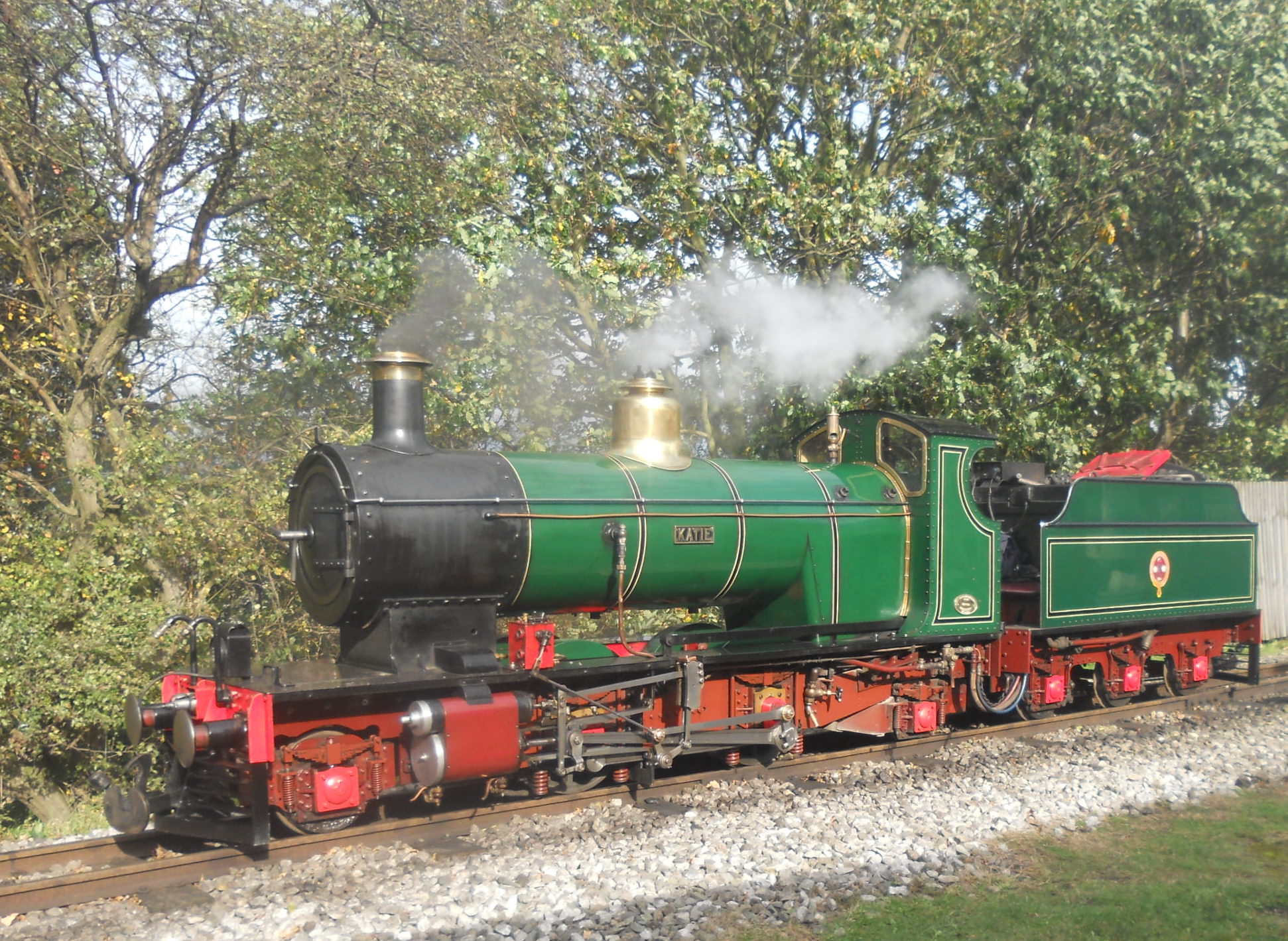
Trevor Guest 2-4-2 'Katie' at Clayton West. This locomotive was formerly based at Fairbourne Railway.

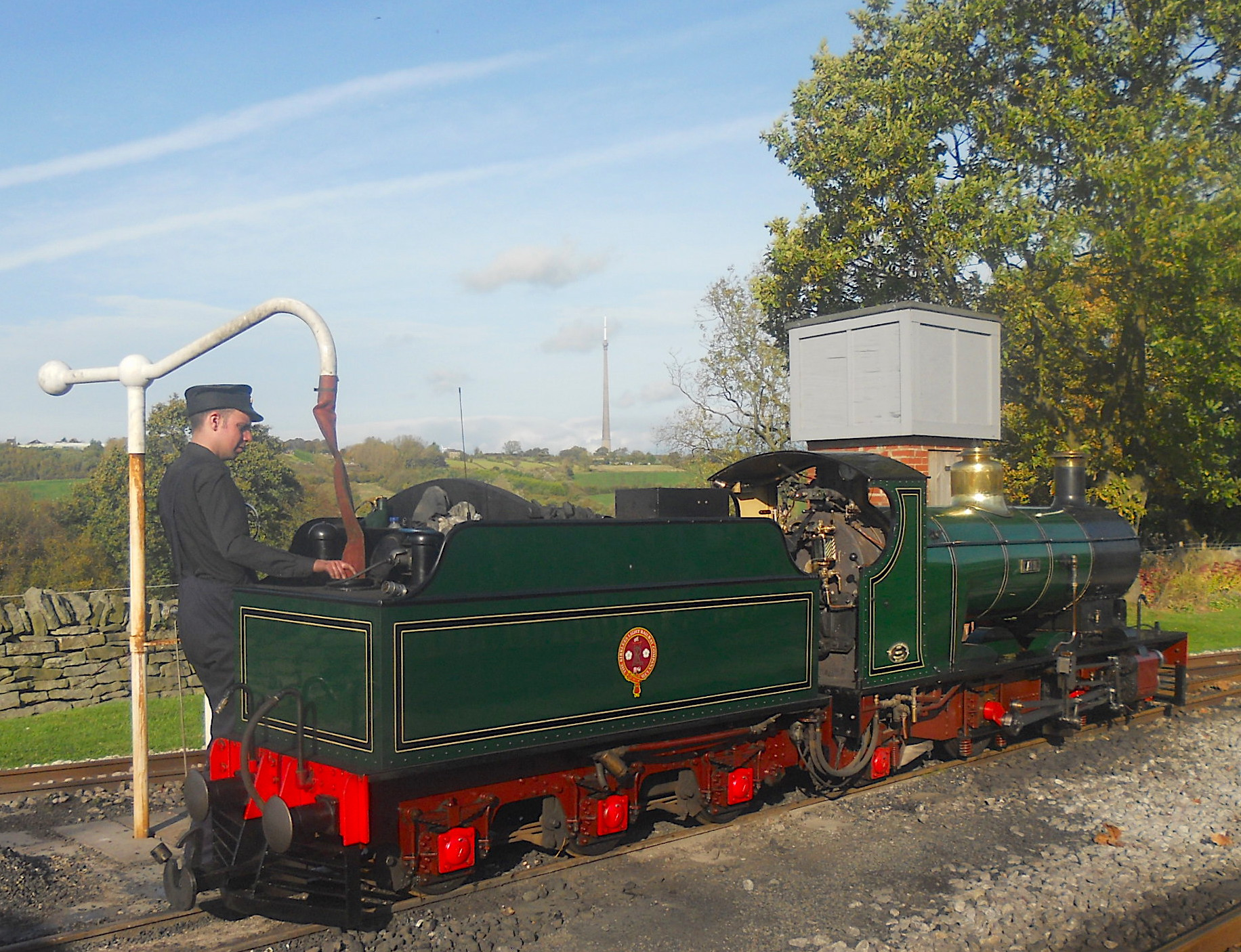
Trevor Guest 2-4-2 'Katie' takes on water at Shelley.

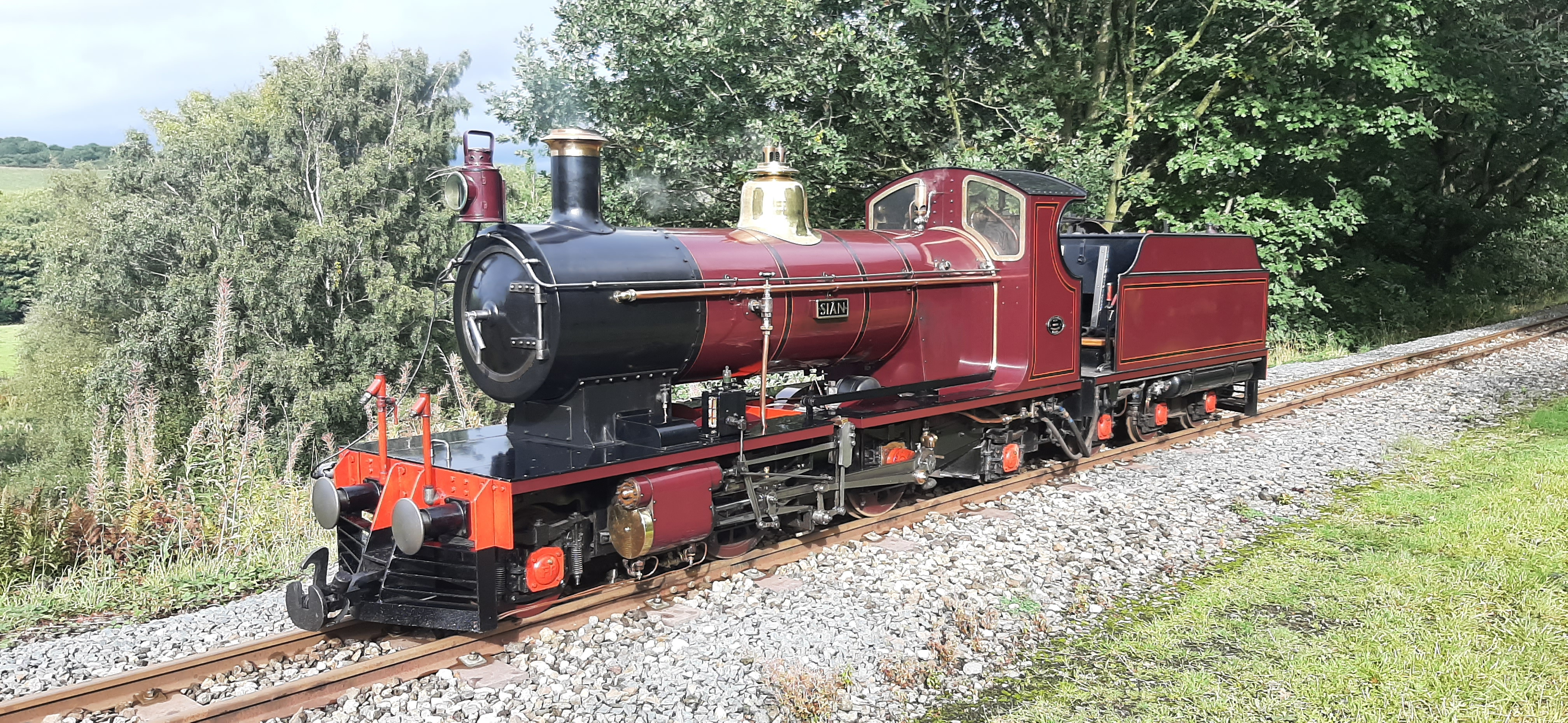
Siân on the Kirklees Light Railway in 2024.
