= Cuckoo's nest (disambiguation) =

A cuckoo's nest is the nest of a cuckoo.

Cuckoo's nest may also refer to:

== Entertainment ==
=== Music ===
- "Cuckoo's Nest" (Roud 1506), a traditional bawdy song, often played as an instrumental

=== Television ===
- "Cuckoo's Nest" (CSI: NY), an episode of CSI: NY
- The Korean name of the South Korean television series Two Mothers (뻐꾸기 둥지)

== Other uses ==
- Cuckoo's Nest (nightclub), Costa Mesa, California, U.S.
- Cuckoos Nest railway station, West Yorkshire, Northern England
- Cuckoo's Nest Studio, an animation studio in Taiwan

== See also ==
- One Flew Over the Cuckoo's Nest (disambiguation)
- Cuckoo's egg (disambiguation)
