= Clayton West =

Village in West Yorkshire, England

Coordinates: 53.5951°N 1.6106°W

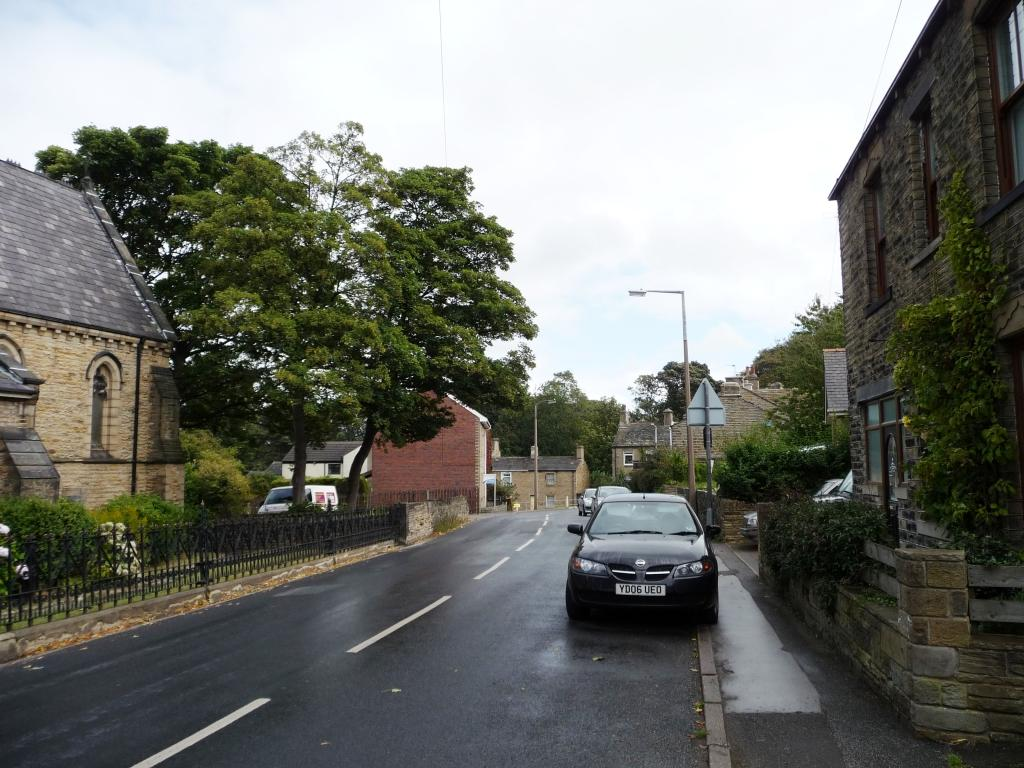
- Clayton West in 2011

- Location within West Yorkshire
- Population: 4,386 (2021 census)
- Civil parish: Denby Dale
- Metropolitan borough: Kirklees
- Metropolitan county: West Yorkshire
- Region: Yorkshire and the Humber
- Country: England
- Sovereign state: United Kingdom
- Post town: Huddersfield
- Postcode district: HD8
- Dialling code: 01484
- Police: West Yorkshire
- Fire: West Yorkshire
- Ambulance: Yorkshire
- UK Parliament: Ossett and Denby Dale

Clayton West is a village in the civil parish of Denby Dale, in the Kirklees district, in West Yorkshire, England. It had a population of 2,704 in 2008. It is 11 miles (18 km) south-east of Huddersfield and 7 miles (11 km) north-west of Barnsley.

== History ==
Clayton West was originally in the parish of High Hoyland, and the Wapentake of Staincross which more or less corresponds with today's Barnsley borough area.

The Industrial Revolution was the transition to new manufacturing processes in the period from about 1760 to sometime between 1820 and 1840. The Industrial Revolution had brought a migration of the population to the Dearne Valley where abundant water was available for manufacturers, so people lived away from the church. Both Clayton West and Scissett had grown so rapidly that there were people still alive in 1873 that could remember the expansion. Although the parish of Scissett had been created in 1839, yet Clayton West remained as a part of High Hoyland.

By 1865 eleven coal mines existed in the Dearne Valley. The Clayton West village coal mine (pit), "Park Mill", closed in 1989, having been somewhat bypassed by the events of the UK miners strike (1984–85). Park Mill Colliery operated for over 100 years.

There is evidence of 700 years of mining in the adjacent village of Emley. Records from the 13th century indicate that monks from Byland Abbey mined and smelted iron ore. They mined using bell pits. A pit was sunk to a depth of 7 meters and worked outward from the bottom of the shaft. Pits dating back to the 16th century can be seen off Woodhouse Lane. Evidence of bell pits is also clearly visible in the woodlands around Duke Wood, down the hill from Cliffe Woods, in Clayton West. Joseph Norton was the owner of a number of mines around the 1870s which he used to mine to produce coal to power his textile mills located at Cuttlehurst and in Scissett. One of these was a mine in Duke Wood. This shaft still acts as an emergency exit and air vent for the privately owned "Flacks" mine, the only mine still operating in the village.

Clayton West railway station opened 1 September 1879, on a line that branched off the Penistone Line. The station closed, along with Skelmanthorpe station, in January 1983. The Kirklees Light Railway now runs and operates trains from the former station.

Clayton West was occasionally used as a location for Britain's longest running comedy series Last of the Summer Wine, in which one of the village's former pubs, "The Shoulder of Mutton" in Church Lane, features prominently. The village lost its post office in 2010.

All Saints Church, on Church Lane, dates from 1875. It belongs to the Diocese of Wakefield. All Saints cost £2,300 to construct between 1872 and 1875. Half of the cost was met by the parish, the other half by WB Beaumont of Bretton Hall (later to be Baron Allendale), the church's patron and benefactor. All Saints can be seen from many places around the village, the only building with a spire, which houses one bell. The roof slates of the church were last replaced in the early 1980s, following a slate appeal when raffle tickets were sold to raise funds for the roof replacement, the spire was also repainted and reclad at this time. In 2019 the roof is again in need of major restoration.

Historical Listings

Clayton West is listed as Clayton [West] in the Domesday book and has been translated as meaning settlement on clayey soil. The settlement had a land value attributed to the Lord of £1 in 1066. Plough land is also listed as being two, with other resources listed as woodland, one half times one half leagues. The Lord in 1066 is stated to be Alsi, son of Karski. The Lord in 1086, following the conquest, was listed as Ilbert de Lacy (1045–1093) and is attributed as the builder of Pontefract Castle, who is also noted as the Tenant-in-Chief in 1086. The de Lacy family took part in the Norman Conquest of Briton and there is evidence that Ilbert fought at William's side at Hastings.

Listed as Clayton, West, the village featured in "A Topographical Dictionary of England" which was published by Samuel Lewis, London, 1848. In 1848 the village had 1440 residents and was described as being 1080 acres belonging to various owners. Mining was listed as the predominant industry, along with the production of silk and worsted goods for clothing. The account states that many large mills had been constructed in the village for this purpose.

In 1848 the four places of worship were listed.

Listed as Clayton (West), in John Marius Wilson's Imperial Gazetteer of England and Wales (1870–72). Clayton West is described as a township of the High Hoyland parish with hamlets of Cuttlehurst, Parkmill, Topitt and Spring-Grove. The village has a post office and comprises 1,098 acres, with real-estate worth £4,371, £122 of which are in mines. The population is now listed as 1,532, with 325 houses. Woollen manufacture is again listed as a pre-dominant industry. Chapels are listed for independents (constructed in 1866) and Baptists.

Further information of the progressing village is delineated in Kelly's 1881 Directory of the West Riding of Yorkshire. It describes "Clayton West" as a township and large village. The manufacture of fancy woollens, as well as twine and flax spinning seems to be the prevalent industry of the village. The church of All Saints, constructed in 1875, is now listed along with Congregational, Baptist, New Connexion Methodist, Primitive Methodist and Wesleyan chapels. Kelly lists the charities for distribution as being £13 annually . Also mentioned is the un-denominational school (Kaye's First School) built by William and John Kaye esqs., which was erected in 1862, and in 1881 William Priestly was school master. Capt. Henry Savile is lord of the manor. The main landowners are listed as W. B. Beaumont esq., M.P. W. T. Spencer-Stanhope esq., J.P. John Kaye esq., J.P. and Thomas Norton esq. J.P. The area occupied by the village is now 1,140 acres with rateable value, £4,548. The population in 1871 was 1,531.

Textile Mills

One such mill, the Spring Grove Mill, still has buildings visible, just off the A636, opposite the Scissett swimming baths building. Locally is it still known as Beanlands Mill, named after the Beanland family who purchased the business in 1869 from Charles Walker for £8,500. The mill stopped operating as such in 1975, and the mill chimney has since been removed along with other buildings. Pictures of the Mill are available.

War Memorial

The village has an obelisk style war memorial, now situated at the junction of Church Lane with Holmfield Road. The memorial commemorates 37 people, 30 from the First World War, six from the Second World War and one from the Falklands War. The war memorial used to be located on the grass triangle at Hill Top.

== Governance ==
There are two tiers of local government covering Clayton West, at parish and metropolitan borough level: Denby Dale Parish Council and Kirklees Council, based in Huddersfield. Kirklees Council is also a constituent member of the West Yorkshire Combined Authority, led by the directly elected Mayor of West Yorkshire.

Clayton West was historically a township in the ancient parish of High Hoyland. In 1862 the township of Clayton West was made a local government district, governed by a local board. Townships were also reclassified as civil parishes in 1866. Local government districts were reconstituted as urban districts in 1894.

Clayton West Urban District was abolished in 1938, merging with several small neighbouring urban districts to form a larger urban district called Denby Dale. The parish of Clayton West continued to exist until 1974, but as an urban parish it had no administrative functions after the creation of Denby Dale in 1938. In 1951 the parish of Clayton West had a population of 1682. Denby Dale Urban District was in turn abolished in 1974 to become part of the new metropolitan borough of Kirklees, at which point a successor parish of Denby Dale was established.

== Geography ==
Clayton West is located between the villages of High Hoyland, Scissett and Skelmanthorpe.

The river that runs through the village is called the River Dearne and was part of the 2007 United Kingdom floods.

== Present day ==
The village is in the parish of Clayton West and High Hoyland. Facilities include a village store and two pubs. It has a primary school and nursery called Kayes First and Nursery School, which was built in 1862, and was doubled in size in 1981. Kayes First and Nursery School consists of 202 children and 32 staff from Nursery to year 5 (2017 figures). The school is also part of a three tier schooling system with Scissett Middle School and Shelley College (formally Shelley High School).

It also has a Scout group which offers access to a number of outdoor activities including archery, target shooting, kayaking and much more.

=== Flooding ===
In 2007 severe flooding of the river Dearne affected some 420 properties in Clayton West and Skelmanthorpe. Summer flooding has also occurred in the area in 2002, 2004, 2007 and 2008. The textile industry history of the area has resulted in modern-day conversions of old textile mill to become residential accommodation. The valley floor also has a high density of residential properties making these areas more prone to flooding.

== See also ==
- Listed buildings in Denby Dale
