= Shelley railway station =

Railway station in West Yorkshire, England

Shelley
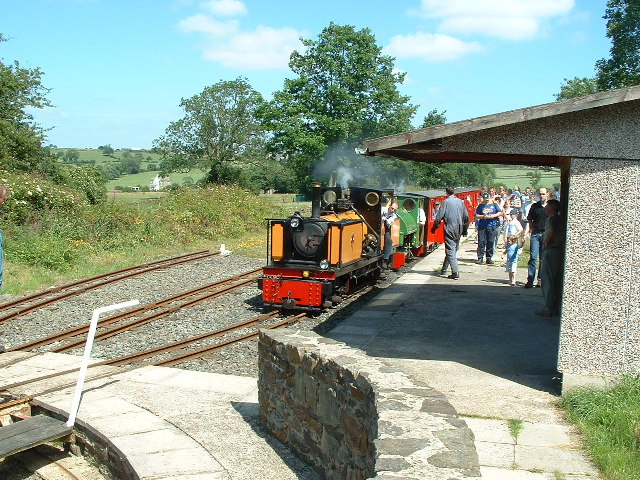
- Approaching the turntable at Shelley station

General information
- Location: Shelley, Kirklees; England
- Coordinates: 53.5873°N 1.6855°W
- Grid reference: SE208101
- System: Station on heritage railway
- Operator: Whistlestop Valley
- Platforms: 1

Key dates
- May 1997: opened
Location

Shelley railway station forms the western terminus of the Whistlestop Valley and serves the village of Shelley, West Yorkshire. England. There was never a station here on the Lancashire & Yorkshire Railway.

== History ==
The original standard gauge line was opened by the Lancashire & Yorkshire Railway as part of their 3 1/2-mile (5.6 km) branch line from Clayton West Junction on the Huddersfield and Sheffield Junction Railway (between Shepley and Denby Dale) to Clayton West. The trackbed was later rebuilt by the Kirklees Light Railway, now known as Whistlestop Valley as a minimum gauge railway.

Preceding station	Heritage railways	Following station
Terminus	Whistlestop Valley	Skelmanthorpe
