= Dorothy Rogers =

Dorothy Rogers (1882–1952) was a famed creator of miniature needlework carpets exhibited during her lifetime and avidly collected after her death. Rogers began her lifetime obsession in her twenties while building a dollhouse for her young daughter. Her husband, an English army Colonel stationed in India, soon joined her in her craft, and the two spent decades engaged in intensive collaborative research and innovation. Rogers modeled many carpets on existing examples in prominent British collections (exploring Turkish, Shirvan, Caucasian, Daghestan, Hamadan, Khamseh, and Baluchi designs) while providing subtle alterations to existing styles. A number of Rogers' carpets contain personalized and possibly coded inscriptions.

Rogers' carpets were purchased by major collectors of the time including Queen Mary, who exhibited them in her celebrated Dolls' house. An April 1947 feature article in The Illustrated London News describes Rogers' "enchanting rugs" as "miracles of fine beauty and craftsmanship" which "may well be said to exceed in precise craftsmanship even the exquisite French tapestries" then on display at the Victoria and Albert Museum. Rogers' carpets typically average between 250 and 400 stitches per square centimeter (1600 to 2500 stitches per square inch) and are worked in wool upon a fine canvas backing.

Although Dorothy Rogers' own dollhouse has long since ceased to exist, many of its carpets and furnishings were exhibited and auctioned in March 1985 by Spink & Son Ltd. in London.
