= Cuckoo's egg =

Cuckoo's egg may refer to:

- Cuckoo's egg (metaphor), a metaphor for brood parasitism including references to spycraft and malware
- Cookoo's Egg, a cryptographic puzzle
- Cuckoo's Egg (book), a 1985 science fiction novel by American writer C. J. Cherryh
- The Cuckoo's Egg (book), a 1989 book by Clifford Stoll

== See also ==
- Cuckoo's nest (disambiguation)
