= One Flew Over the Cuckoo's Nest =

One Flew Over the Cuckoo's Nest may refer to:

- One Flew Over the Cuckoo's Nest (novel), a 1962 novel by Ken Kesey
- One Flew Over the Cuckoo's Nest (play), a 1963 stage adaptation of the novel starring Kirk Douglas
- One Flew Over the Cuckoo's Nest (film), a 1975 film adaptation of the novel starring Jack Nicholson

== See also ==
- "One Flew Over the Cuckoo Clock", episode of The Green Green Grass
- "One Flew Out of the Cuckoo's Nest", the two-part final episode of The Golden Girls
- Cuckoo's nest (disambiguation)
