= Queen Mary's Dolls' House =

Dollhouse

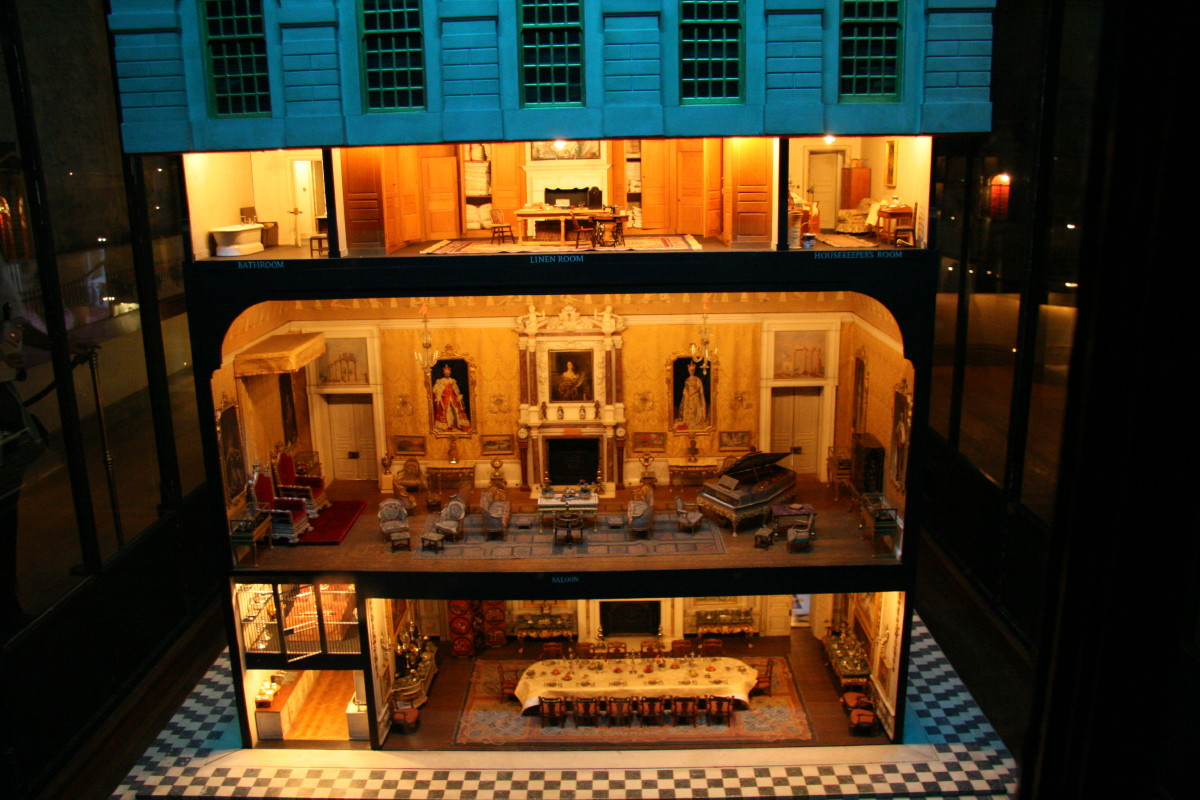
Queen Mary's Dolls' House (east side): ground-floor dining room, first-floor saloon and top-floor housekeeper's suite; bottom left: strongroom (above the butler's pantry)

Queen Mary's Dolls' House is a dolls' house built in the early 1920s, completed in 1924, as a gift for Queen Mary (the consort of King George V). It was designed by architect Sir Edwin Lutyens, with contributions from many notable artists and craftsmen of the period, and includes a library of miniature books containing original stories written by authors including Sir Arthur Conan Doyle and A. A. Milne. Since 1925 it has been on public display in Windsor Castle (at Windsor, Berkshire, in England).

== History ==
The idea for building the dolls' house originally came from Queen Mary's cousin, Princess Marie Louise, who discussed her idea with one of the top architects of the time, Sir Edwin Lutyens, at the Royal Academy Summer Exhibition of 1921. Sir Edwin agreed to construct the dolls' house and began preparations. Princess Marie Louise had many connections in the arts and wrote around two thousand letters (by hand) to top artists and craftsmen of the time, asking them to contribute their special abilities to the house. It was created as a gift to Queen Mary from the people, and to serve as a historical document on how a royal family might have lived during that period in England. In spite of its name, the dolls' house is without dolls (except for a pipe major and five guardsmen to man the sentry boxes).

The dolls' house showcased the very finest and most modern goods of the period. Later it was put on display to raise funds for Queen Mary's charities. It was originally exhibited at the British Empire Exhibition, 1924–1925, where more than 1.6 million people came to view it; it was also exhibited at the 1925 Ideal Home Exhibition, after which it was placed on display in Windsor Castle, where it remains (visitors were charged 6d entry, which was passed on to the queen's charitable fund).

The interior of the display room in the castle, where it is located, was also designed by Lutyens (it had formerly been a china room); the room is decorated with architectural motifs and with murals by Philip Connard. The glass cabinet which surrounds the house was provided by Pilkington for the Ideal Home Exhibition display and subsequently donated.

== Description ==
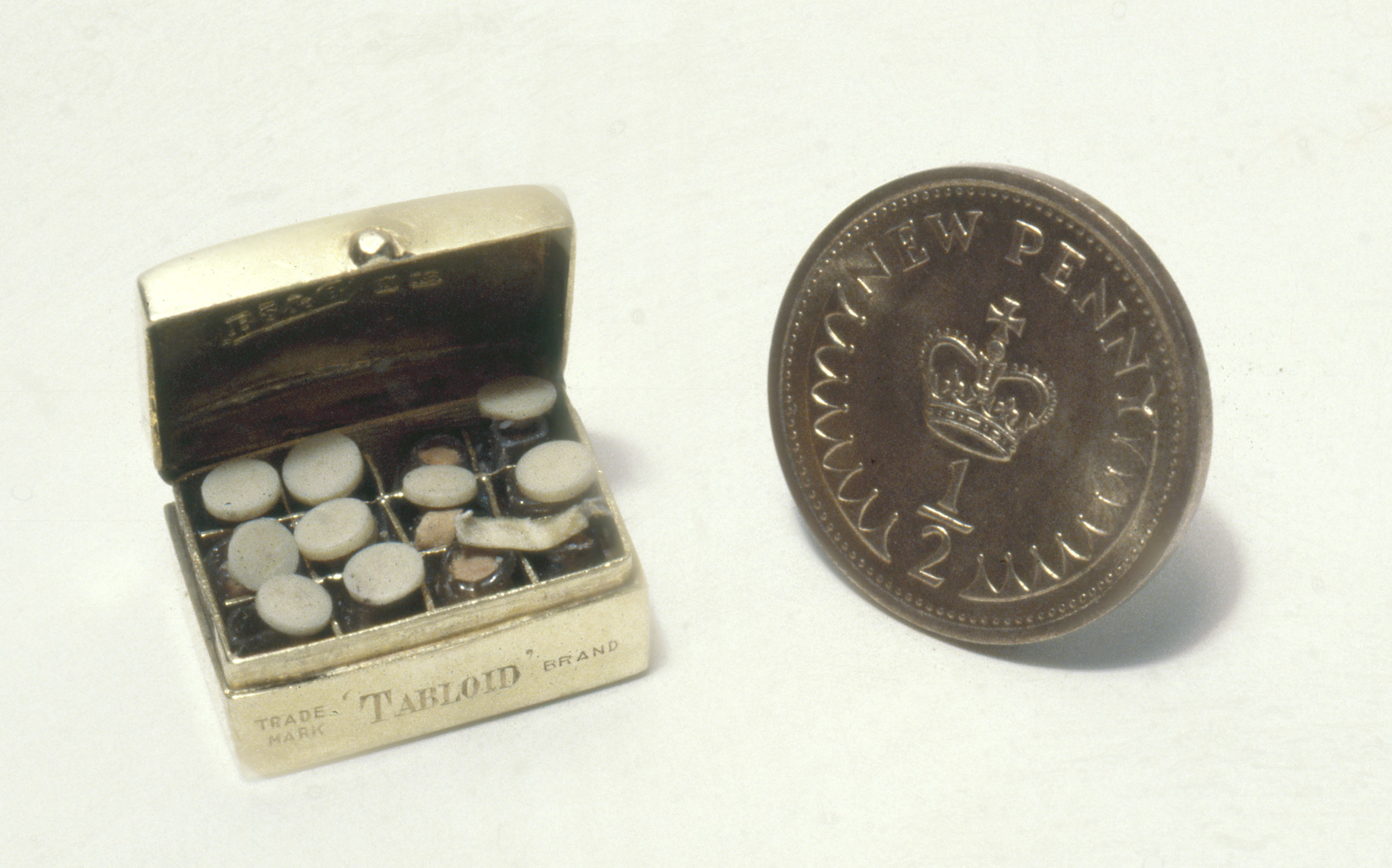
A medicine chest from the dolls' house, shown next to a 17-millimetre (0.67 in) halfpenny

The dolls' house was made to a scale of 1:12 (one inch to one foot), is over three feet tall, and contains models of products of well-known companies of the time (many of them made and donated by the companies themselves). The neo-classical exterior is made of wood, painted to resemble Portland stone; it has sliding sash windows and is roofed with miniature Welsh slates. An electric mechanism hidden in the roof serves to raise and lower the external shell of the house, so as to reveal the interior.

The house is remarkable for its detail and the detail of the objects within it, all of which are 1/12-sized replicas of royal or household items. Some of the furnishings are scaled reproductions of original pieces in Windsor Castle (or other stately homes); others were designed by Lutyens himself (or other contributors to the project). Many items were made and donated by manufacturers; others were recreated by specialist modelmakers (such as Twining Models of Northampton, England). Over 750 miniature works of art were given by contemporary artists.

The carpets, curtains and furnishings are all copies of the real thing; many of the doors, cupboards and cabinets have functioning locks; and the house has working electric lights and bells. The bathrooms are fully plumbed with piped, running water, and include a flushable toilet with miniature lavatory paper. Two fully-functioning Otis lifts are provided (a passenger lift, serving the three principal floors, and a service lift, serving the mezzanines in addition). Other items in the house include Purdey shotguns that "break and load", monogrammed linens, three Chubb safes (in the library, strongroom and queen's wardrobe), seven functioning clocks by Cartier and a garage of cars with operational engines. The Gramophone Company provided a working wind-up gramophone, with a playable set of His Master's Voice records; and Broadwood provided two pianos (one grand, one upright), "real pianofortes, with sound-board, cast steel frame, strings and hammers complete". Even the bottles in the wine cellar were filled with the appropriate wines and spirits, and the wheels of motor vehicles were properly spoked. Queen Mary's purchases brought media attention to specialist furnishers such as Dorothy Rogers, who created needlework miniature carpets for the house.

=== Library ===
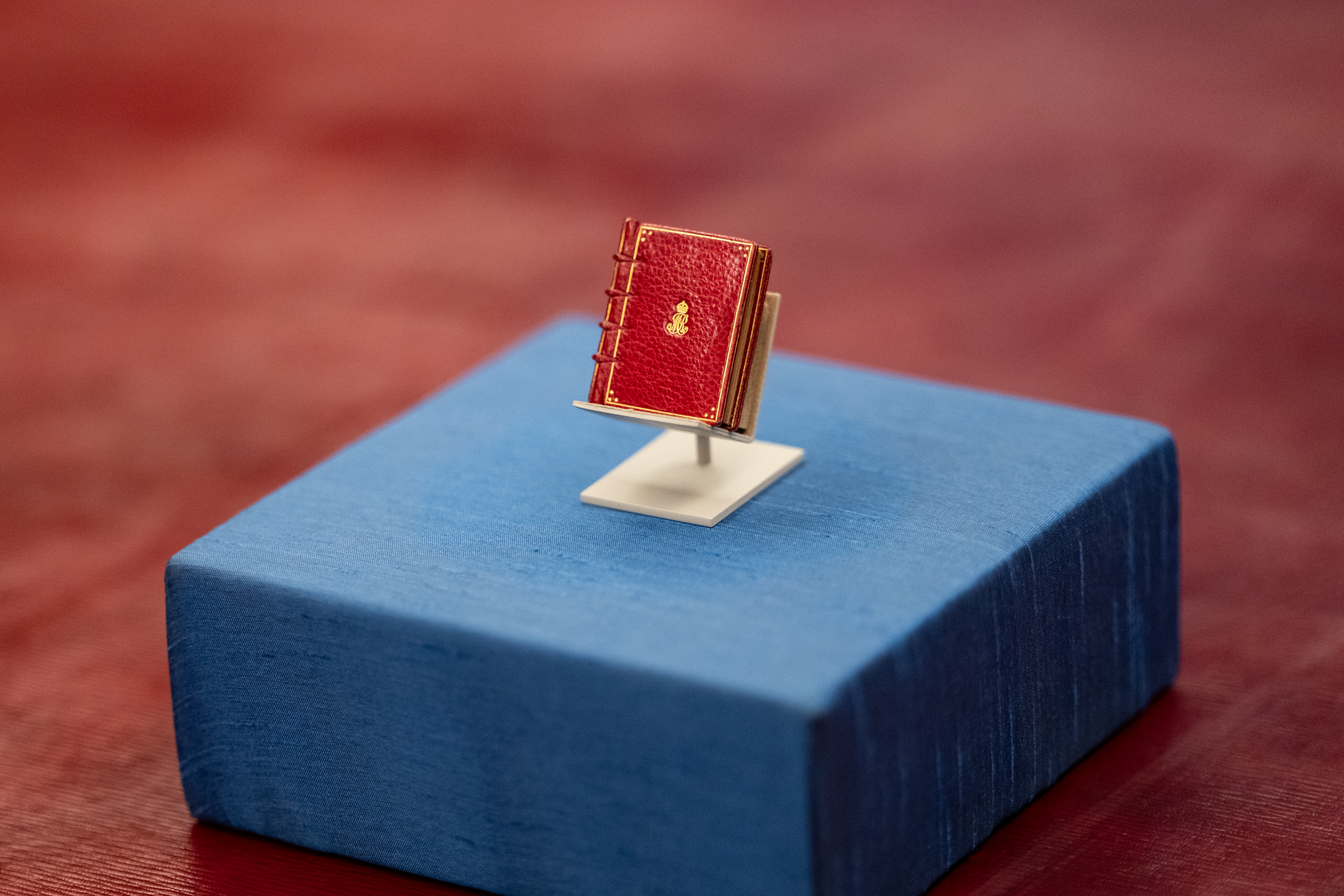
A miniature book from the library

In addition, 171 well-known writers wrote special books for the house's library, which were bound in scale size by Sangorski & Sutcliffe (among others). Sir Arthur Conan Doyle contributed the short story "How Watson Learned the Trick", and the ghost-story writer M. R. James wrote "The Haunted Dolls' House". A. A. Milne contributed "Vespers". Other authors included J. M. Barrie, Hilaire Belloc, Robert Bridges, John Buchan, G. K. Chesterton, Joseph Conrad, E. M. Delafield, Walter de la Mare, Sir James G. Frazer, John Galsworthy, Robert Graves, Sir H. Rider Haggard, Thomas Hardy, A. E. Housman, Aldous Huxley, Rudyard Kipling, Ronald Knox, Rose Macaulay, Compton Mackenzie, W. Somerset Maugham, Alice Meynell, Sir Arthur Quiller-Couch, Vita Sackville-West, Siegfried Sassoon, Cornelia Sorabji, H. de Vere Stacpoole and Edith Wharton. (George Bernard Shaw rebuffed the princess's request for a tiny volume of his work.) While several contributions were in the form of poetry or prose fiction, other genres of work were also submitted: for instance, Agnes Jekyll (who was overseeing the provision of items for the kitchen) contributed a Dolls' House Cookery Book, Horace Hutchinson provided a Manual of Games, Viscount Haldane contributed An Essay on Humanism and the eminent surgeon Sir John Bland-Sutton proffered Principles of Dolls' Surgery. The library was also furnished with miniature reproductions of older works, including selected works by Burns and Dickens, a full set of The Ellen Terry Shakespeare, three Bibles and a copy of the Koran. Reference works were provided (by means of microphotography), including English and French dictionaries, Whitaker's Almanack, Who's Who, Kelly's Directory and Bradshaw's Guide, while Stanfords provided maps and atlases. Scale copies of newspapers and periodicals were also placed in the library.

Twenty-five composers contributed sheet music, including Arnold Bax, Arthur Bliss, Frederick Delius, Gustav Holst, John Ireland, Dame Ethel Smyth and Adela Maddison (who curated the collection); though Sir Edward Elgar (who later served as Master of the King's Music) refused to contribute to the project.

Seven hundred painters provided miniature pictures ('about the size of two postage stamps') for folio cabinets in the library, (though today these works are kept in the print room of Windsor Castle). The contributors included: Helen Allingham, H. M. Bateman, Gladys Kathleen Bell, Gerald Brockhurst, F Gregory Brown, Gordon Browne, Kate Eadie, Mark Gertler, Sigismund Goetze, Catherine B. Gulley, William Haselden, William Hatherell, Peter Alexander Hay, Edith Mary Hinchley, Henry Holiday, Laura Knight, Margaret Macdonald Mackintosh, Fortunino Matania, Harry Morley, Tom Mostyn, Paul Nash, Frank Reynolds, George Spencer Watson, Eli Marsden Wilson and Sydney Curnow Vosper. Two pen-and-ink drawings by G. Howell-Baker were supplied by his sister, who wrote to say that he had recently died when the request for his contribution arrived from the palace.

== Layout ==
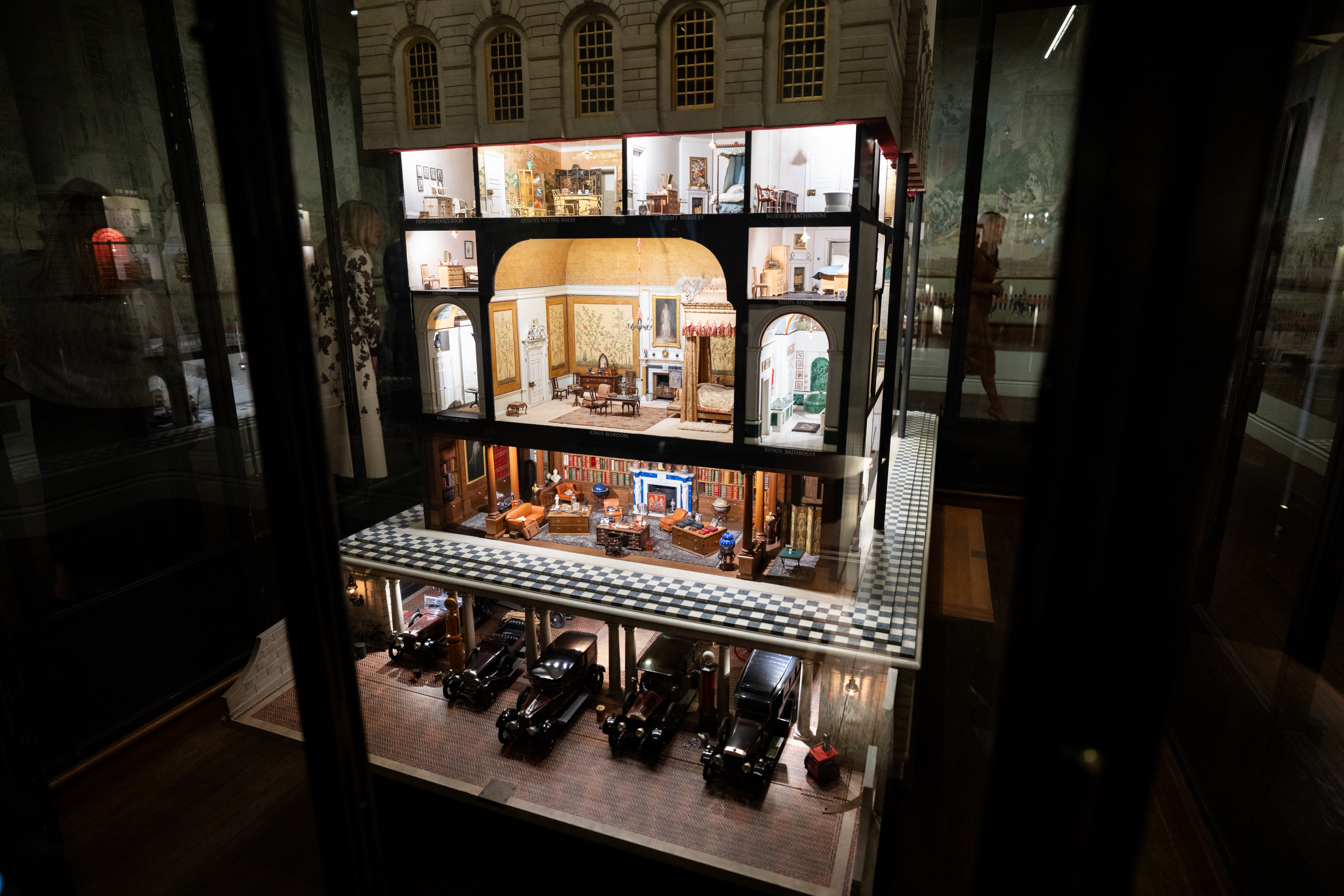
The west side of the house: the king's apartment is on the piano nobile (above the ground-floor library and the garage in the basement); on the top floor is the princess royal's bedroom, the queen's sitting room, the night nursery and the nursery bathroom. There is also a pair of servants' rooms at the upper mezzanine level.

The house consists of three main storeys above a basement. There are also two mezzanine levels in the house (an "upper mezzanine" over the first floor and a "lower mezzanine" over the ground floor). Beneath the basement, the house stands on a plinth (part of Lutyens' design) which contains drawers designed to accommodate dolls.

=== North side ===
The main entrance of the house is on the north side. The interior here is dominated by the principal staircase, which ascends from the entrance hall on the ground floor to a double-height upper hall above (which is a perfect cube). Lobbies on either side connect with spaces behind, which provide access to the other rooms of the house on each level, via a service staircase (on the east side) and the passenger lift (on the west side). Next to the passenger lift is a sports cupboard, containing golf clubs, tennis rackets, archery equipment and a croquet set.

The entrance hall includes a bronze Venus by Francis Derwent Wood and a painting of Windsor Castle by Sir David Young Cameron. There is also a table with a visitors' book and a chair for the porter (with a copy of the Daily Mail). The upper hall is decorated with murals by Sir William Nicholson, and busts by C. S. Jagger and Sir William Goscombe John.

At basement level on the north side is a utility room (for the workings of the doll's house) containing a water tank, a transformer with electrical switch gear, and the base of the lift shafts.

=== East side ===
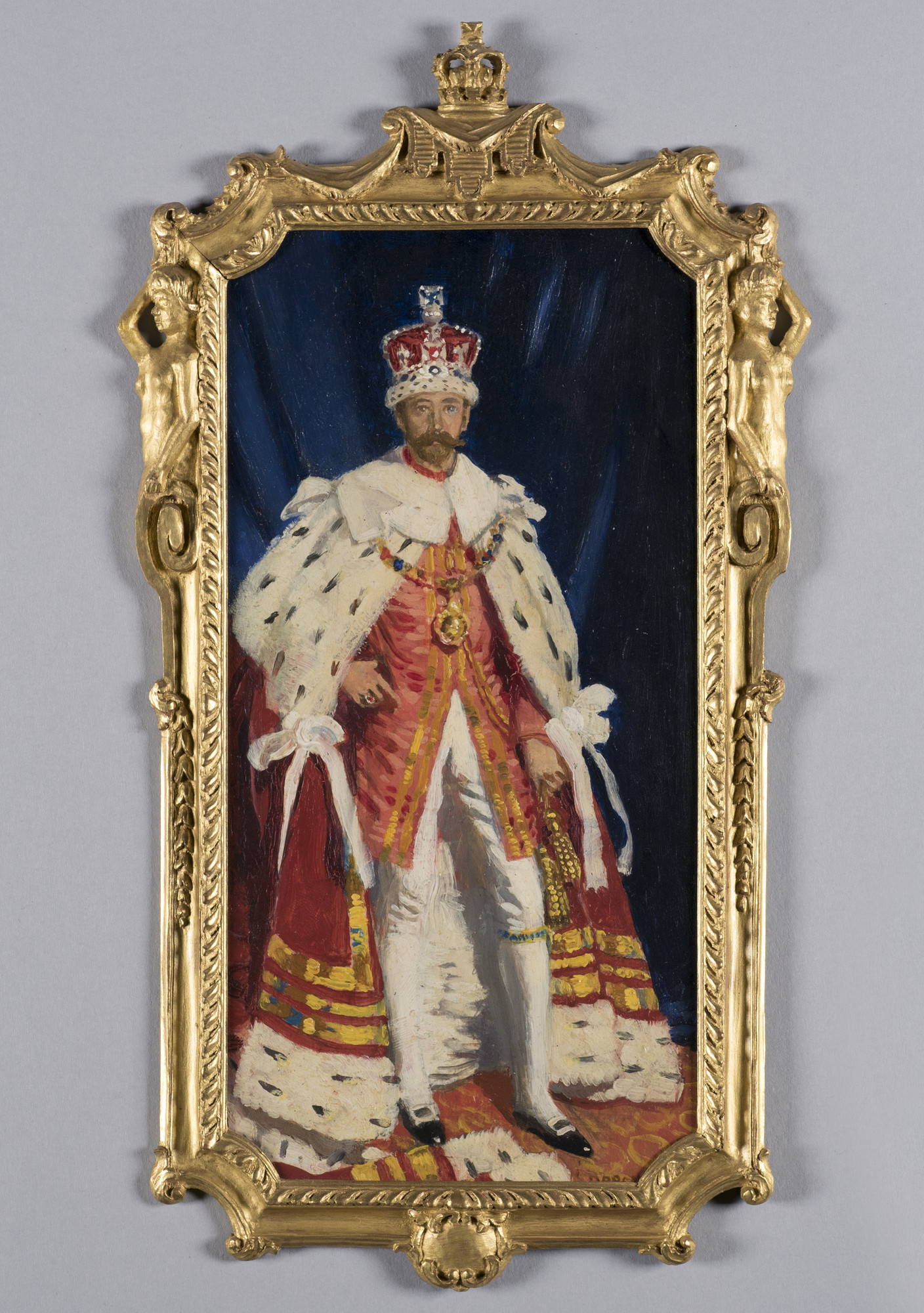
King George V

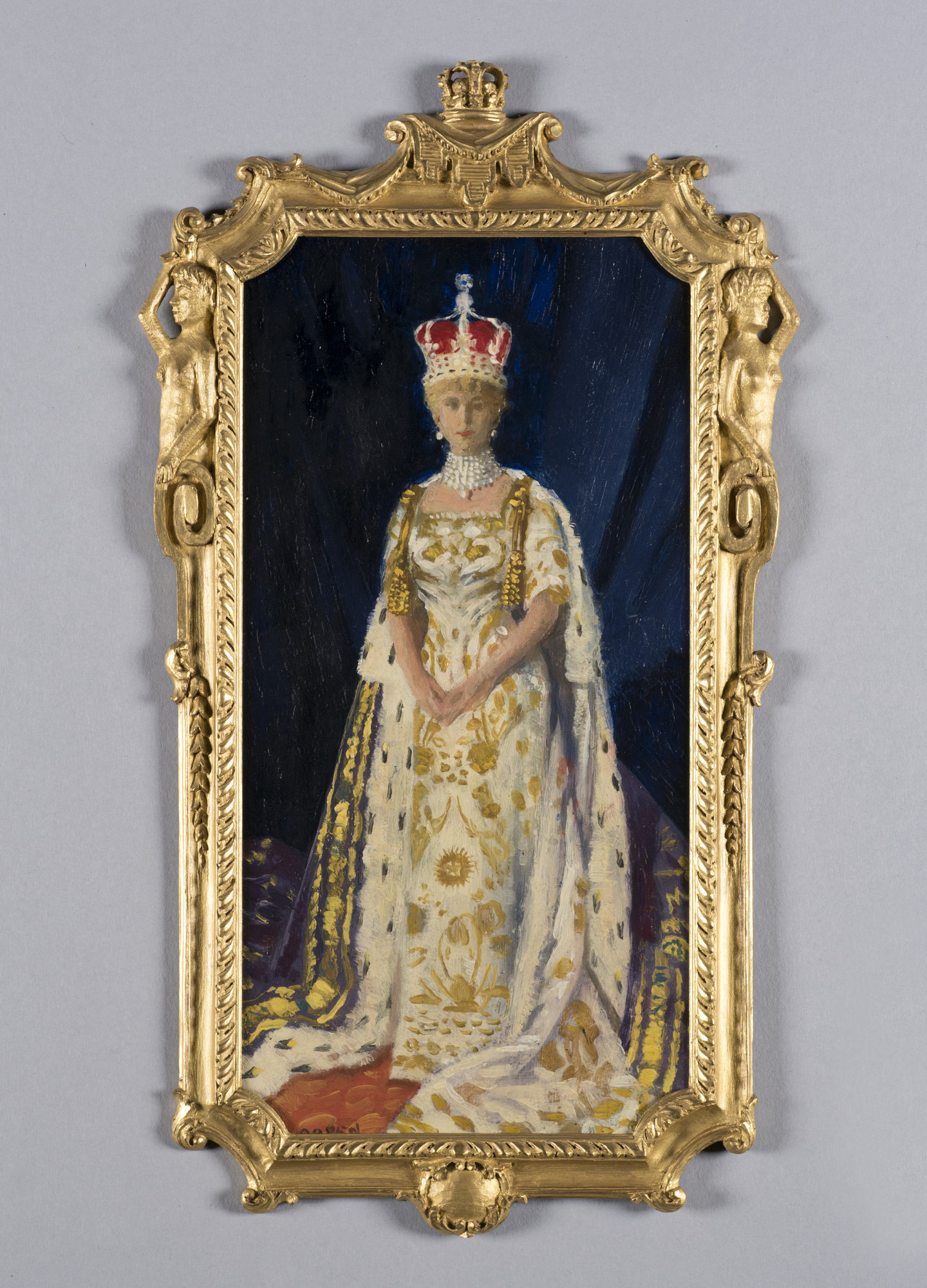
Queen Mary

Portraits by Sir William Orpen for the saloon

The east side of the house contains the principal public rooms, overlooking the garden (which emerges from a drawer at basement level below). The dining room on the ground floor has a table set for eighteen (with a silver dinner service by Garrard and Webb's crystal glasses). The room is lined with paintings by various artists, including Sir Alfred Munnings, Ambrose McEvoy, W. B. E. Ranken and Alfred Pearse. The painted ceiling is by Gerald Moira and the carpet hand-made by Ernest Thesiger. The southernmost bay of the ground floor is occupied by the butler's pantry, with a strongroom above it (on the lower mezzanine floor), accessed from the butler's bedroom. The pantry has cupboards containing multiple sets of Doulton china (an eighteen-piece dinner service and six-piece dinner, breakfast and coffee services, as well as separate sets for the kitchen and nursery). The plate is stored in the strongroom, where there is a functioning Chubb safe and a suitably-scaled display of the Crown Jewels of the United Kingdom.

The entire width of the first-floor is occupied by the saloon, the house's main reception room; the ceiling is painted by Charles Sims. Furnishings include a pair of gilded thrones, a Broadwood grand piano (with casework painted by T. M. Rooke) and a lacquer cabinet (given by the Marchioness of Londonderry) copied from a full-size original in Londonderry House. The room is decorated with royal portraits by Sir William Orpen, Sir John Lavery and Harrington Mann, with landscapes by Adrian Stokes and overdoors by Lady Patricia Ramsay.

The top floor is occupied by the housekeeper's suite: a large central linen room (with a modern electric iron and a Singer sewing machine) flanked by the housekeeper's bedroom and bathroom. To the rear, the housemaids' closet is provided with a Hoover vacuum cleaner and an array of miniature cleaning materials.

At basement level there is a hidden garden, revealed only when a vast drawer is pulled out from beneath the main building. Designed by Gertrude Jekyll, it includes replicas of greenery and garden implements and follows a traditional ornamental garden theme. An Atco mowing machine is provided.

=== South side ===
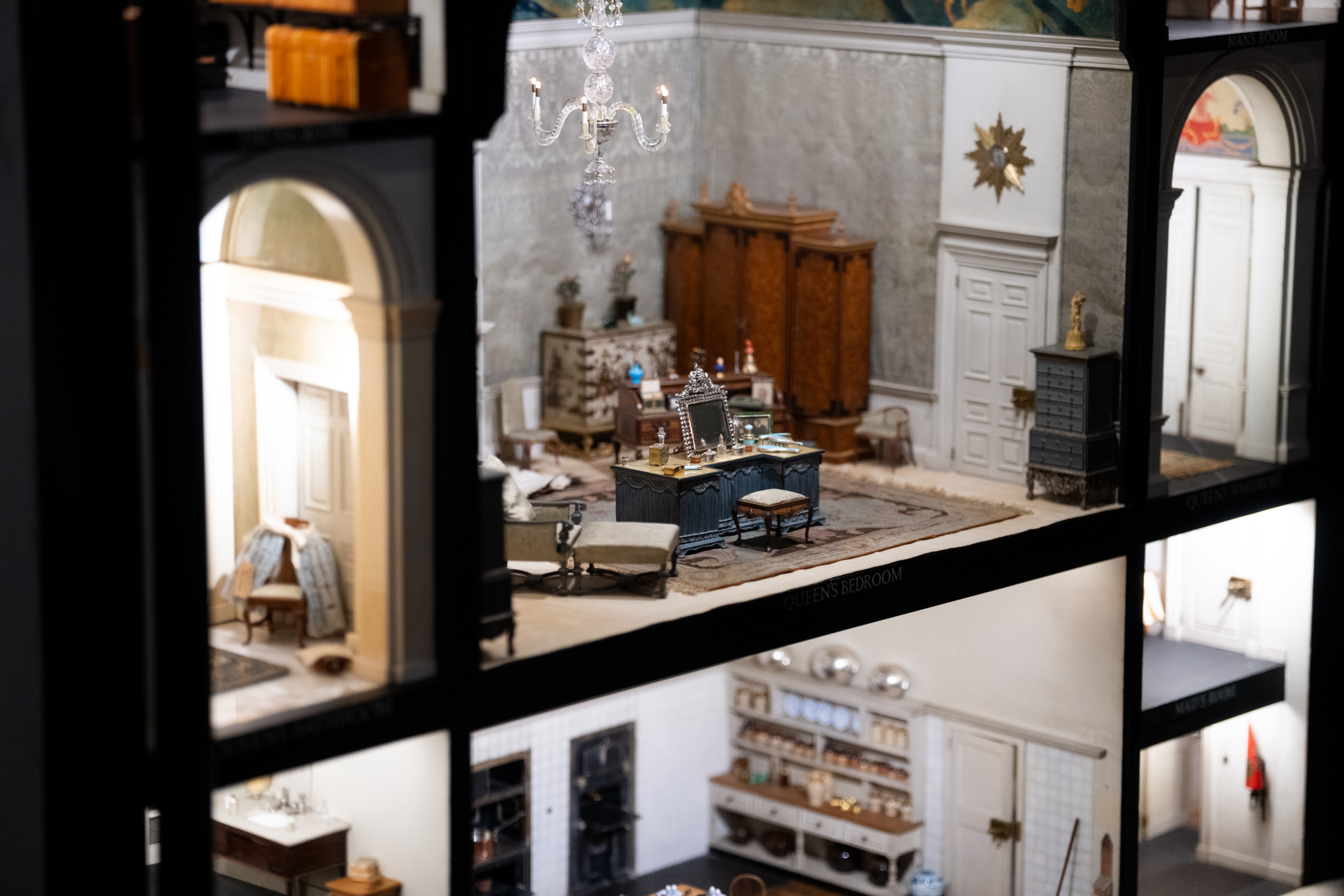
South side of the house: close-up of the queen's bedroom (above) and the kitchen (below)

The ground floor is dominated by the kitchen, flanked by the servery to the east (which adjoins the butler's pantry and the dining room) and the scullery to the west. The kitchen has tiled walls and a woodblock floor, and is equipped with a coal-fired range; at its centre is a large oak table, and there are numerous pots and pans and other utensils, including a mincing machine, weighing scales and a coffee grinder. There is also a cat, as well as three mice in a humane mousetrap. The scullery has lead-lined sinks with wooden plate-racks and a refrigerator; the servery is provided with a hotplate (and a Minimax fire extinguisher).

The queen's apartment occupies the first floor (the principal room being the queen's bedroom, in the centre, which is flanked by her wardrobe to the east and bathroom to the west). The bedroom ceiling is painted by Glyn Philpot, those in the wardrobe and bathroom are by Robert Anning Bell and Maurice Greiffenhagen respectively. Above the fireplace is a painting of the Duchess of Teck by Frank Salisbury. The walls are hung with blue silk damask and there is a tall Queen Anne style four-poster bed.

The top floor is dominated by the day nursery, containing numerous toys, including a train set, a model theatre and tin soldiers. It has wall paintings depicting fairy tales, by Edmund Dulac. The adjacent lobbies have cupboards containing a Wedgwood breakfast service and medical supplies, among other items; there are also tins of Fry's cocoa, and biscuits by Huntley & Palmers and McVitie & Price.

At basement level, beneath the kitchen, is the wine cellar and storage rooms for foodstuffs and provisions. The cellar is stocked with over 1,200 bottles of champagne, wine, spirits and beer, brought together by Francis Berry of Berry Bros.

=== West side ===
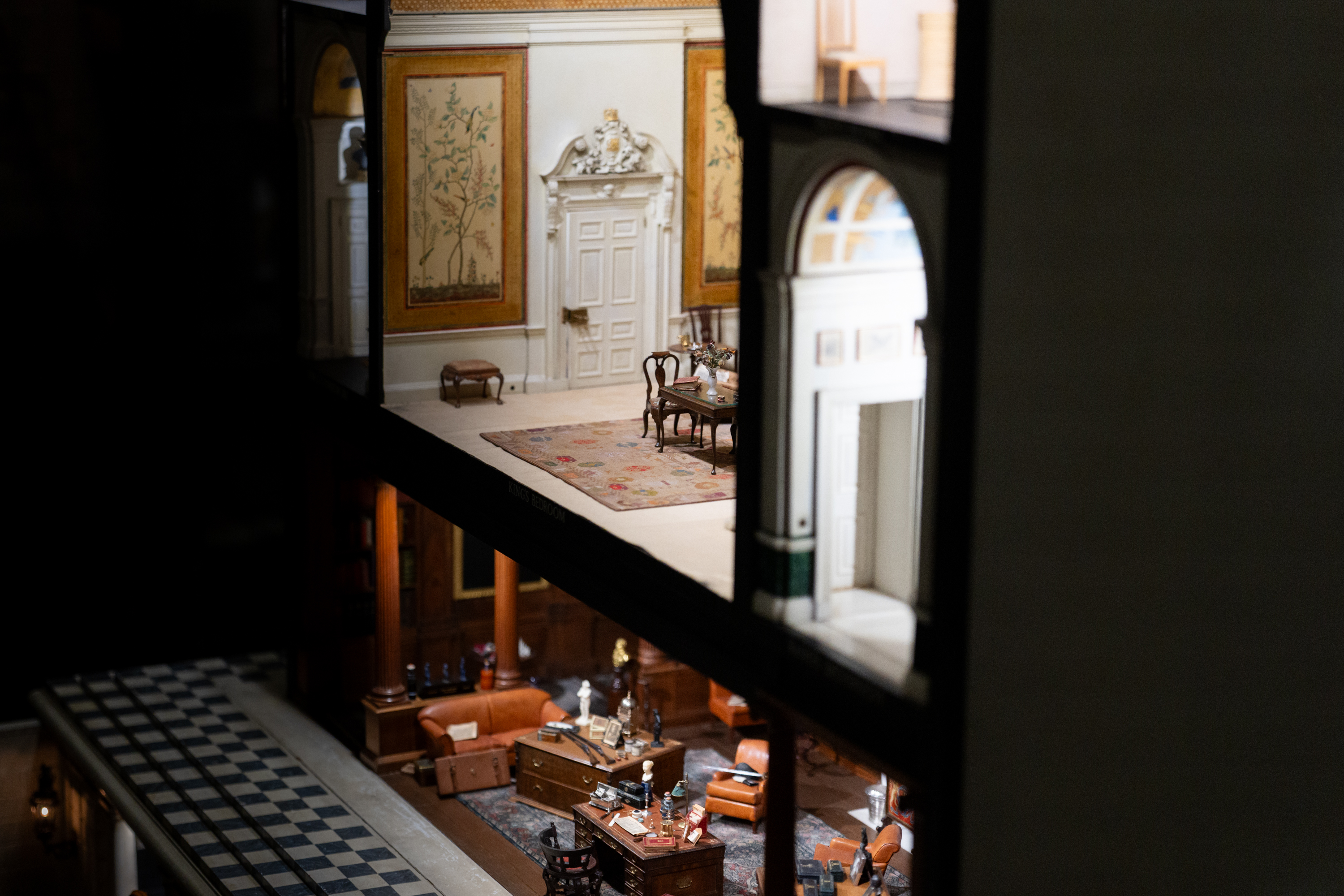
West side of the house: close-up of the king's bedroom (above) and the library (below)

The wood-lined library occupies the whole width of the house on the west side. There is a walnut desk in the centre, with note paper, envelopes and invitation cards, and on either side two folio cabinets designed to house seven hundred watercolours, prints and drawings by artists of the day. The library also contains a gun cabinet, a cabinet for the king's dispatch boxes, and numerous other items including a stamp album, a photograph album, cigars and pipes, fencing foils, a chess set and a card table (with packs of cards to scale). There is also a wireless (by British Thomson-Houston) hidden in a cabinet. The painted ceiling is by William Walcot and there are portraits of Tudor monarchs by Nicholson, Frank Reynolds and Sir Arthur Cope.

On the first floor is the king's apartment, which (like the queen's) consists of a wardrobe and bathroom either side of a central bedroom. The walls and ceiling of the bedroom are painted by George Plank; it too is furnished with a four-poster bed. The wardrobe has a painted ceiling by Wilfrid de Glehn; that in the bathroom is by Laurence Irving, and on the walls are miniature Punch cartoons. The wardrobe contains walking sticks by Brigg & Sons and a field marshal's sword by Wilkinson; in the bathroom are Addis toothbrushes and numerous other items.

On the top floor is the queen's sitting room (an informal room furnished with Chinoiserie and with walls painted by Dulac); it has a child's room (the princess royal's room) on one side and the night nursery (and nursery bathroom) on the other.

The garage, hidden in a basement-level drawer beneath the library, contains six miniature motor cars, each contributed by their manufacturer: two Daimlers (a limousine-landaulet and a station bus), a Rolls-Royce limousine-landaulet, a Vauxhall saloon car, a Sunbeam open touring car and a Lanchester saloon limousine, as well as a Rudge-Whitworth motorcycle (with sidecar) and bicycle. All the cars are painted in royal claret and black livery.

=== Exterior ===
The ground floor of the house is rusticated, with round-headed windows and door openings. The first floor has square-headed windows (with a variety of pediments, triangular, flat and curved). The top floor forms an attic storey, topped by balustrades with ornamental urns and statues by Sir George Frampton. On the principal (north) front, the central section projects slightly and is given a pediment (with a carving of the royal arms), which is supported at first-floor level by six Corinthian columns. A pair of sentry boxes is provided. On the roof of the house is a flagpole, which usually flies Queen Mary's personal standard.

== Reproductions ==
The ceramics company Cauldon China produced a Parian ware box modelled on the house, measuring 9.5×15 cm, and 12.5 cm high, at around the time of the 1924 exhibition. A version was also produced with the exhibition's crest applied as a colour transfer, in the manner of crested ware. Some of the proceeds were donated to Queen Mary's charities.

== Centenary ==
In 2024, twenty new manuscripts were added to the house's library as part of the anniversary project headed by Queen Camilla to reflect Britain's modern literature. Sebastian Faulks, Bernardine Evaristo, Elif Shafak, Malorie Blackman, Alan Bennett, Julia Donaldson, Anthony Horowitz, Tom Stoppard, A. N. Wilson, Jacqueline Wilson, Philippa Gregory, Simon Armitage, Ben Okri, Joseph Coelho and Tom Parker Bowles were among the authors who contributed.

== See also ==
- Astolat Dollhouse Castle
- Colleen Moore Dollhouse
