= Gladys Kathleen Bell =

British artist (1882-1965)

- Born: Gladys Kathleen Farrar; 1882
- Died: 1965 (aged 82–83); Haddenham, Buckinghamshire
- Known for: Miniature painting
- Spouse: Reginald Bell

Gladys Kathleen Madge Bell née Farrar (1882–1965) was a British artist and miniature painter.

== Biography ==
Bell studied at the Cope and Nichols' School of Art at Kensington in London. From 1910, Bell exhibited at the Royal Academy some 28 times, mostly miniatures and portraits. She also exhibited at the Paris Salon, at the Liverpool Academy of Arts, and with the Royal Society of Miniature Painters, RMS. Bell was elected a full member of the RMS in 1927. A miniature by Bell was commissioned for Queen Mary's Dolls' House and is now in the Royal Collection.

Bell was married to the stained glass artist Reginald Bell and the couple lived at Hampstead in London and later, at Great Missenden in Buckinghamshire. Their son Michael Charles Farrar Bell also became an artist.
