= Clayton West railway station =

Railway station in West Yorkshire, England

Clayton West
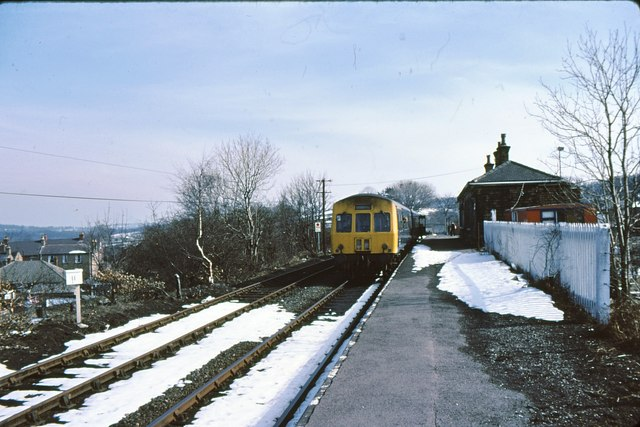
- Clayton West railway station in 1979

General information
- Location: Clayton West, Kirklees; England
- Coordinates: 53.597146°N 1.611230°W
- Grid reference: SE257112
- System: Station on heritage railway
- Operator: Whistlestop Valley
- Platforms: 1

History
- Original company: Lancashire & Yorkshire Railway
- Pre-grouping: London & North Western Railway
- Post-grouping: London, Midland & Scottish Railway

Key dates
- 1 September 1879: opened
- 24 January 1983: closed
- 1991: reopened
Location

Clayton West railway station is a station that was previously on the national rail network (until 1983) and now forms the eastern terminus of the Whistlestop Valley. It is situated in Clayton West, West Yorkshire, England. It is 11 miles 18 chains (18.1 km) from Huddersfield, measured via Shepley.

== History ==
The 3 1/2-mile (5.6 km) Clayton West branch line to Clayton West from Shepley Junction was authorised by an act of Parliament on 11 June 1866. It was opened on 1 September 1879 and was built to double line standards, as so many of the Lancashire & Yorkshire Railway branch lines in this area were.

It was closed on 24 January 1983. The station reopened as part of the Whistlestop Valley heritage railway in 1991, and now forms the main station for the railway.

Preceding station	Heritage railways	Following station
Cuckoo's Nest	Whistlestop Valley	Terminus
	Disused railways	
Skelmanthorpe	Lancashire & Yorkshire Railway; Clayton West branch line	Terminus
