= Listed buildings in High Hoyland =

High Hoyland is a civil parish in the metropolitan borough of Barnsley, South Yorkshire, England. The parish contains twelve listed buildings that are recorded in the National Heritage List for England. All the listed buildings are designated at Grade II, the lowest of the three grades, which is applied to "buildings of national importance and special interest". The parish contains the village of High Hoyland and the surrounding countryside, and, to the north, the southernmost part of Bretton Park, to the south of the lakes. The listed buildings in Bretton Park are a well, a grotto, and a footbridge. The listed buildings in and around the village are a church and memorials in the churchyard, a farmhouse, and a field barn.

== Buildings ==
Name and location	Photograph	Date	Notes
All Hallows Church; 53.59161°N 1.58655°W		1679	The oldest part of the church is the tower, the body of the church being rebuilt in the late 18th century, and in 1906–08 by C. Hodgson Fowler. The church is built in stone with a stone slate roof, and is in Perpendicular style. It consists of a nave, a south porch, a chancel with short gabled transepts on the south, and a west tower. The tower has diagonal buttresses, a three-light west window, an inscribed and dated plaque on the south side, and an embattled parapet with corner pinnacles.
Rock Well, Bretton Park; 53.60717°N 1.56361°W		1685	The well, also known as Lady Eglinton's Well, is in stone and built into a rock face. There is a central door with a deep lintel, and paired engaged columns with fluted capitals. It has a simple entablature containing a sculpted limestone owl, and an inscribed and dated tablet. There are stone steps on three sides in front of the well.
Winter Hill Farmhouse; 53.58561°N 1.59814°W	—	17th or early 18th century	The farmhouse is rendered, and has a stone slate roof with chamfered gable copings on moulded kneelers. There are two storeys, two bays, and a small single-storey rear wing. The doorway is to the right, and the windows are mullioned.
Raised grave slab (Copley); 53.59145°N 1.58632°W	—	c. 1705	The grave slab is in the churchyard of All Hallows Church, and is to the memory of members of the Copley family. It is in sandstone, it has an inscription, elaborate relief carving of foliage and flowers around the edge, and at the top is a cartouche with winged child supporters.
Raised grave slab (Cawthrey); 53.59152°N 1.58661°W	—	c. 1718	The grave slab is in the churchyard of All Hallows Church, and is to the memory of Matthew Cawthrey. It is in sandstone, and has rounded top corners and simple moulding on the edge.
Hoyland Hall; 53.58803°N 1.58818°W		c. 1725	A large house in stone, on a plinth, with angle pilasters rising as rusticated quoins, a moulded eaves cornice, and a stone slate roof with gable copings on short moulded kneelers. There are three storeys, a double-depth plan, and a symmetrical front of five bays. The central doorway has a moulded architrave, a fanlight, and an open segmental pediment on console brackets. The windows are sashes, and the middle windows in the upper floors are linked by an apron.
Field barn, Hall Farm; 53.58773°N 1.58984°W	—	Early to mid-18th century	A stone barn with quoins, and a stone slate roof with chamfered gable copings on moulded kneelers. It contains entrances with quoined surrounds, slit vents, and pitching holes.
Raised grave slab (Ellis); 53.59151°N 1.58668°W	—	c. 1740	The grave slab is in the churchyard of All Hallows Church, and is to the memory of members of the Ellis family. It is in sandstone, and has a moulded edge and relief decoration at the top corners.
Raised grave slab (Knight); 53.59152°N 1.58651°W	—	c. 1740	The grave slab is in the churchyard of All Hallows Church, and is to the memory of Jane Knight. It is in sandstone, and has a verse, a moulded edge, and relief decoration of stylised foliage and flowers at the head.
Two tomb chests 53.59154°N 1.58634°W	—	c. 1752	The tomb chests are in the churchyard of All Hallows Church, and both are in sandstone, with moulded edges, and fluted corners. One is to the memory of members of the Moreton family, and has arched relief decoration at the head, and crude winged angels in the corners. The other tomb chest is to the memory of members of the Croft family, and has a simple moulded edge.
Grotto, Bretton Park; 53.60682°N 1.57860°W		c. 1780	The grotto is in stone and has a circular plan and a conical roof. There is a central roughly pointed archway and flanking roughly arched windows. Inside are the remains of shell decoration, and a central pendant.
Footbridge in Menagerie Wood, Bretton Park; 53.60654°N 1.57397°W		c. 1782 (probable)	The bridge carries a track over an arm of the Lower Lake in Bretton Park. It is in gritstone, and consists of a single round arch. The bridge has voussoirs, a flat walkway with a single-course parapet, and the sides are curved.
