= High Hoyland =

Village and civil parish in South Yorkshire, England

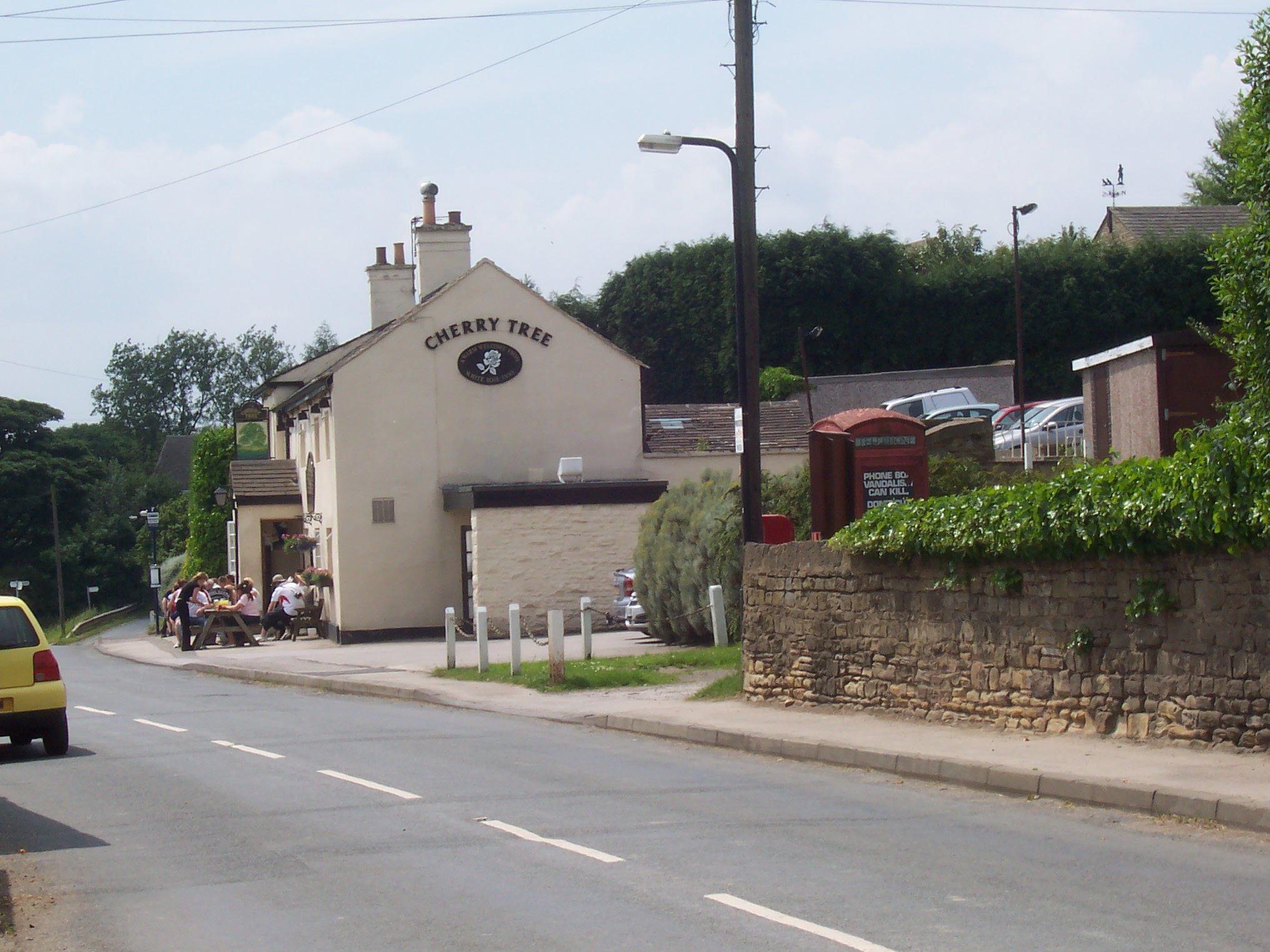
- The Cherry Tree Inn at High Hoyland

- Location within South Yorkshire
- Population: 128 (2011 census)
- Civil parish: High Hoyland
- Metropolitan borough: Barnsley
- Metropolitan county: South Yorkshire
- Region: Yorkshire and the Humber
- Country: England
- Sovereign state: United Kingdom
- Post town: BARNSLEY
- Postcode district: S75
- Dialling code: 01226
- Police: South Yorkshire
- Fire: South Yorkshire
- Ambulance: Yorkshire
- UK Parliament: Penistone and Stocksbridge

High Hoyland is a village and civil parish in the Metropolitan Borough of Barnsley in South Yorkshire, England. It lies to the west of Kexbrough in between there and Clayton West, and is located at approximately 53°35′10″N 1°35′30″W, at an elevation of around 200 metres above sea level. At the 2001 census it had a population of 142, reducing to 128 at the 2011 Census.

== History ==
There is some evidence to suggest that High Hoyland has quite an ancient history, though no archaeological survey has yet taken place. Some people believe the village may have been the site of an Iron Age hill fort, and its strategic hilltop location would surely have been a good place for one. Nearby Kexbrough (originally Cezeburgh) also lends weight to the theory, since the "burghs" were originally strongholds.

The village was nevertheless in existence in 1086 when the Domesday survey was compiled. The village was listed as Heyholand, being one of only 16 settlements in present-day South Yorkshire to be recorded.

The name Hoyland derives from the Old English hōhland meaning 'land on a hill spur'.

Today a bridleway runs along the ridge above the village; originally this was a trans-Pennine salt track, and was also mentioned in the Domesday survey.

== Present day ==
The village is now part of Barnsley's metropolitan area, yet retains a very rural feel and has become part of the commuter belt west of Barnsley, which also includes Silkstone and Cawthorne. The Cherry Tree Public House is one of the most famous in South Yorkshire, and has won awards for both its ale and its views - with spectacular open vistas across the valley. From here it is possible to see Cannon Hall, the Peak District National Park, Barnsley Town Hall and on clear days the cooling towers of the distant power stations of Drax and Eggborough.

== See also ==
- Listed buildings in High Hoyland
