= Twining Models =

English model-making firm

Twining Models of Northampton, England, was founded in 1920 by Ernest W. Twining. The firm had its origins in work Twining was doing as a sub-contractor to Bassett-Lowke's. It undertook, mostly for Bassett-Lowke's, (though never a formal part of that company), the manufacture of high quality glass-case models, which were often marketed under Bassett-Lowke's name. Twining sold out in 1940, and the firm was run until 1967 as Twining Models (E. H. Clifton) Ltd.. E. H. Clifton had been a director of Twining Models, having started working for Twining as a school-leaver before Twining Models was first established.

Throughout its forty-seven-year history, Twining Models established a reputation as one of the foremost British model makers. It specialised in architectural, industrial, and transport models. Before WW2 it made a number of models for the Queen Mary's Dolls' House, designed by Sir Edwin Lutyens and now at Windsor Castle, stained-glass work (on which Twining was an expert) and astronomical telescopes. After WW2 the firm made a number of planning models used in the re-development of bomb-damaged cities, also various kinds of power stations and industrial developments. The firm was never large, usually employing only a handful of craftsmen. In all some 400 models were made by the firm during its existence.
