= Skelmanthorpe railway station =

Railway station in West Yorkshire, England

Skelmanthorpe
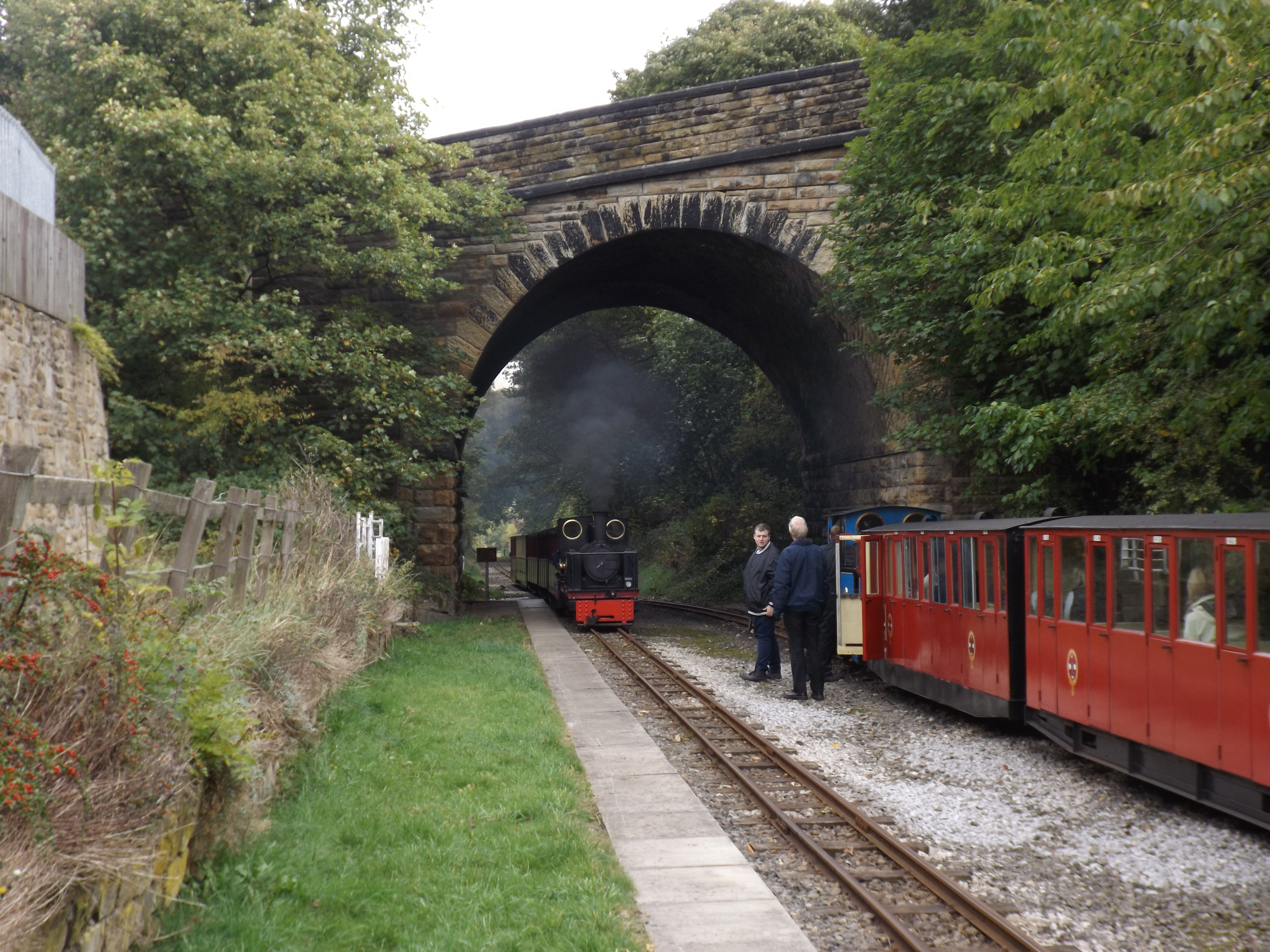
- Skelmanthorpe Station. The bridge carries Station Road over the Whistlestop Valley.

General information
- Location: Skelmanthorpe, Kirklees; England
- Coordinates: 53.59507°N 1.65397°W
- Grid reference: SE230110
- System: Station on heritage railway
- Operator: Whistlestop Valley
- Platforms: 2

History
- Original company: Lancashire & Yorkshire Railway
- Pre-grouping: London & North Western Railway
- Post-grouping: London, Midland & Scottish Railway

Key dates
- 1 September 1879: opened
- 24 January 1983: closed
- 26 December 1992: reopened
Location

Skelmanthorpe railway station is a station in West Yorkshire, England, that was previously part of the national rail network, and is now a station on the minimum-gauge Whistlestop Valley.

== History ==
The station was opened in 1879 by the Lancashire & Yorkshire Railway. It was on the company's 3 1/2-mile (5.6 km) branch line to Clayton West, which junctioned with the Huddersfield and Sheffield Junction Railway between Shepley and Denby Dale stations.

Preceding station	Heritage railways	Following station
Shelley	Whistlestop Valley	Cuckoo's Nest
	Disused railways	
Shepley	Lancashire & Yorkshire Railway; Clayton West branch line	Clayton West
