= Shepley railway station =

Railway station in West Yorkshire, England

Shepley
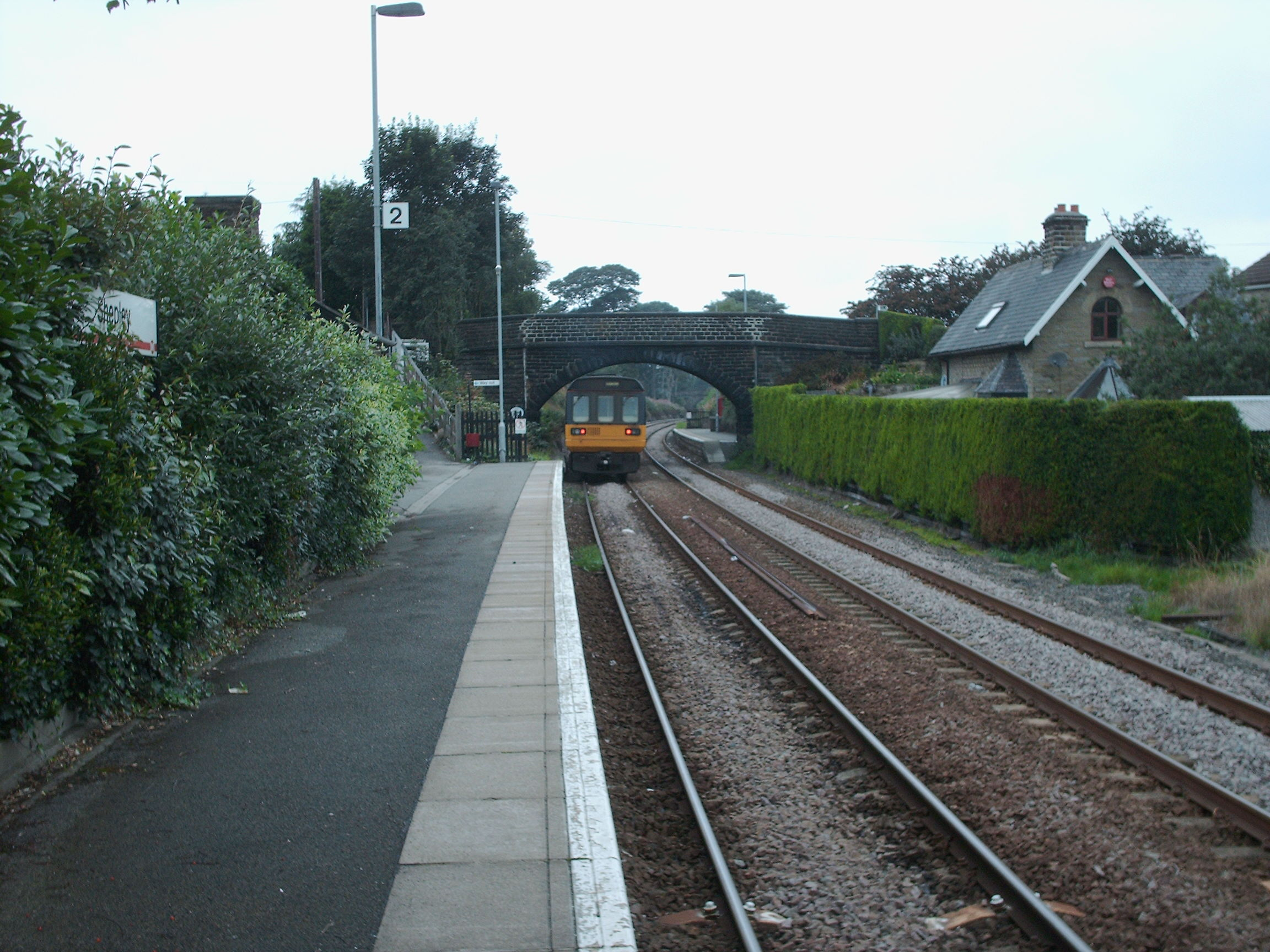
- The view from platform 2, with a train leaving for Huddersfield

General information
- Location: Shepley, Kirklees; England
- Coordinates: 53.588950°N 1.705370°W
- Grid reference: SE196103
- Manager: Northern Trains
- Transit authority: West Yorkshire (Metro)
- Platforms: 2

Other information
- Station code: SPY
- Fare zone: 5
- Classification: DfT category F2

History
- Opened: 1 July 1850; 176 years ago

Passengers
- 2021/22: ▲52,358
- 2022/23: ▲55,128
- 2023/24: ▼54,392
- 2024/25: ▲62,316
- 2025/26: ▼56,828
Location
Notes
- Passenger statistics from the Office of Rail and Road

Shepley railway station serves the villages of Shepley and Shelley in West Yorkshire, England. It lies on the Penistone Line operated by Northern. Opened by the Lancashire and Yorkshire Railway in 1850, it is located at the southern end of one of the two passing loops on the otherwise single track section between Barnsley and Huddersfield.

Shepley was also the junction station for the former branch line to Clayton West, via Skelmanthorpe from its opening in 1879 until closure in January 1983 – the branch has since been reopened as the minimum gauge Kirklees Light Railway, whose western terminus at Shelley is located just under a mile to the east.

The station layout is slightly unusual in that the platforms are staggered (on the opposite sides of a road bridge, as can be seen in the accompanying photo) rather than being located opposite each other like other stations on the route. The station once had a goods yard which has now been converted to housing; its main building on the northbound platform still stands, but is not in rail use.

== Facilities ==
In August 2013, plans were released to install electronic real-time information screens (CIS) at the station. It was later revealed by Metro that they will be installed by January/February 2015. These were eventually commissioned in the spring of 2015. The station has been unstaffed since 1966, and has a ticket machine. There are basic shelters on both platforms and only the Huddersfield platform has step-free access.

== Services ==
Trains operate hourly from Shepley in each direction, towards Huddersfield, and to Barnsley and Sheffield. Until 2017, services operated two-hourly each way on Sundays but since then they run hourly as during the week.

Preceding station	National Rail	Following station
Denby Dale	Northern Trains Penistone Line	Stocksmoor
Disused railways
Terminus	L&YR Clayton West branch line	Skelmanthorpe
