= Cuckoo's Nest railway station =

Railway station in West Yorkshire, England

Coordinates: 53.594991°N 1.633917°W

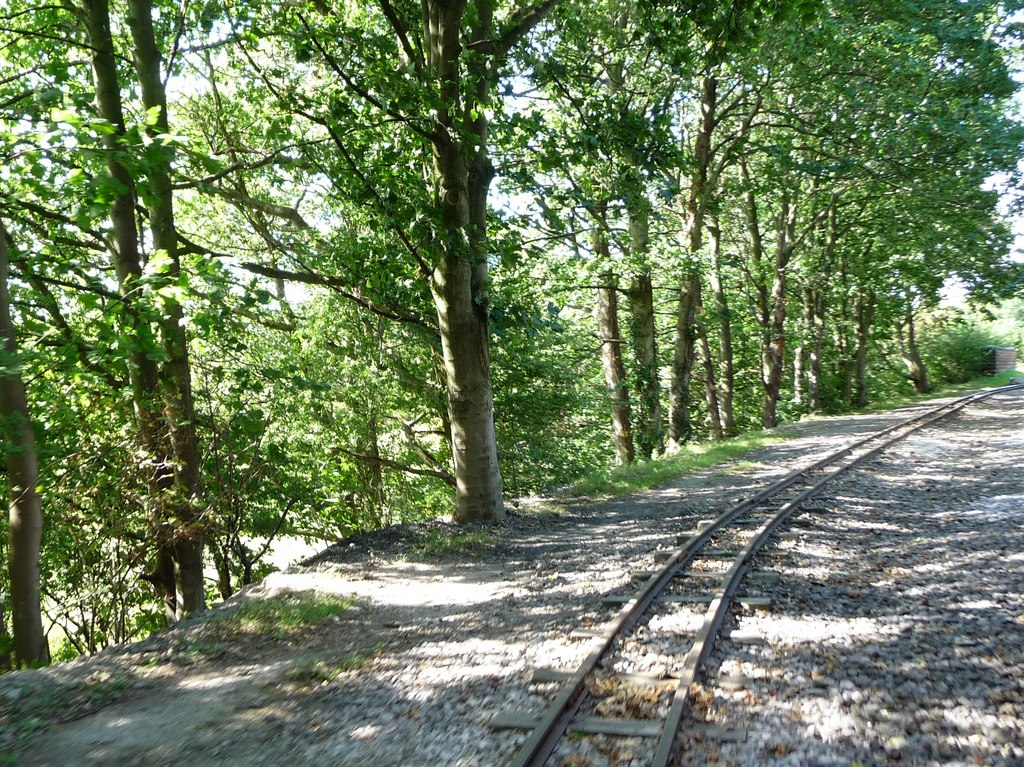
Passing loop at Cuckoo's Nest

Cuckoos Nest railway station is a station/halt on the minimum gauge Whistlestop Valley in West Yorkshire, Northern England. It also serves the village of Scissett. The station was opened on 19 October 1991 with an inaugural run from Clayton West. The halt lies just under 1-mile (1.6 km) west of Clayton West.

Preceding station	Heritage railways	Following station
Skelmanthorpe	Whistlestop Valley	Clayton West
