= Ernest W. Twining =

British model engineer (1875–1956)

Ernest W. Twining (March 29, 1875 - September 10, 1956) was a modelmaker, artist, and engineer.

== Biography ==
Ernest Twining was born in Bristol, England, and was trained as a telephone engineer. He also took art lessons at night school. After working on the Glasgow telephone system for a while, he established a commercial art studio in London, where, as a side-line, he branched out into designing and making model aircraft for sale, in due course expanding to the manufacture of full size gliders.

== Twining Models ==
His model-making work brought him into contact with Bassett-Lowke, the Northampton model making firm, for whom he did sub-contract work. In 1920 he founded Twining Models at Northampton, which manufactured glass-case models of industrial, architectural, advertising and transport themes.

== Other interests ==
Twining was polymathic in his interests, and was active in the worlds of model railways, art and design, aeronautics, astronomy and photography, ships and ship models, and stained glass.

In Northampton, his windows can be found at Holy Trinity Church Hall, St Edmunds, Hardingstone, St Francis de Sales, Wolverton and the Northampton Museum.

== Writing ==
Twining was also a prolific author, writing for numerous hobby magazines, and wrote several books, the most notable being:

- The Art and Craft of Stained Glass (1928), long regarded as the best textbook available.
- Art in Advertising (1931) (with Dorothy E. M. Holditch).
- Indoor Model Railways (1937)

== World War II ==
Twining sold out his interest in his business in 1940, and moved back to Bristol where he spent the war years on the staff of the Bristol Aeroplane Company, working as a draughtsman. After the war he worked for a Bristol stained glass firm, helping repair damaged glass in bombed churches. Twining died at Bristol in 1956.

== In Japan ==
A 15-inch gauge miniature steam locomotive named Ernest W. Twining exists in Japan at the Shuzenji Romney Railway in Shizuoka Prefecture. This originally worked at Dudley Zoo in the UK before moving to the Fairbourne Railway in 1961. It was a freelance 4-6-2 (2-C-1) Pacific tender loco designed by Twining and built by G & S Light Engineering & Maintenance Co., Ltd. in Stourbridge, West Midlands, in 1950 to Works No. 10. Although the worksplate which it has states year built as 1949, this is incorrect, and the plate was fitted by the Fairbourne Railway, not by the builder. Driving wheels are 20" diameter, with two cylinders of 5 1/16" diameter, 8" stroke and piston valves. The locomotive is equipped with steam brakes, and hand brakes on the tender. Bogie tender air brakes and a new boiler were fitted in 1961.

On page 104 of “Preserved Steam Locomotives of Britain” ISBN 0 7137 0917 0 published in 1982 by Blandford Press, to accompany the colour plate No. 36 showing a blue liveried Ernest Twining about to start its train of open carriages at Fairbourne Railway, the author Colin Garratt wrote “This engine was originally built as a 15” miniature gauge Black 5 for the Dudley Zoo Railway by Guest of Stourbridge. In 1966, she was rebuilt into a Pacific with British colonial pretensions and now works on the Fairbourne Railway. The engine is a representative of the Greenly school of practice.
