= Elland Power Station =

Former power station in West Yorkshire, England

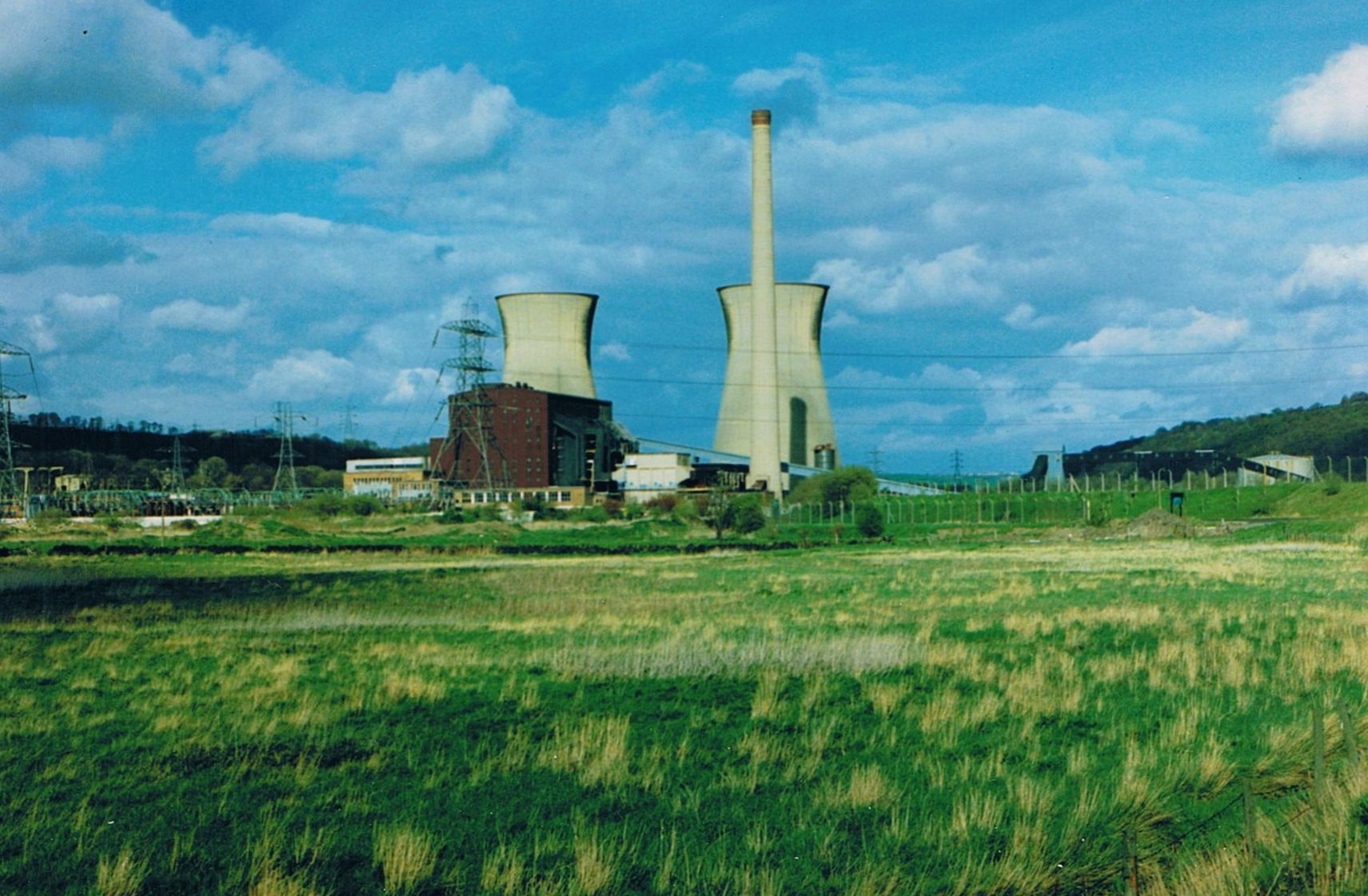
- Elland Power Station
- Country: England
- Location: West Yorkshire
- Coordinates: 53.694312°N 1.822772°W
- Construction began: 1951
- Commission date: 1959
- Decommission date: 1991
- Operators: Central Electricity Generating Board (1959-1990); Powergen (1990-1991)

Thermal power station
- Primary fuel: Coal

Power generation
- Units operational: 3 x 60 MW
- Make and model: Metropolitan-Vickers
- Nameplate capacity: 180 MW

External links
- Commons: Related media on Commons

Elland Power Station was a 180 MW coal-fired power station situated adjacent to the Manchester to Wakefield railway line and on a loop of the River Calder, north east of the town of Elland in West Yorkshire. The station occupied a site of some 65 acres.

== History ==
The construction of Elland Power Station was planned in 1945. It was designed and built by the then Central Electricity Generating Board (CEGB), Northern Project Group. Building work began in 1951 and the project cost £10 million. The first generating unit began generating electricity on 7 August 1959 2nd unit September 1959 and the final set in February 1960 and was officially opened 28 April 1961. The station used three Metropolitan Vickers 60 MW generating sets. Later in the 1960s, the station won an award for its clean and efficient operation. There were three pulverised fuel boilers (two John Brown, one Yarrow) each rated for 69 kg/s of steam; steam conditions were 62.06 bar and 482 °C.

The site chosen is near the main Wakefield-Manchester railway line, and reception sidings have been provided for six trains, each of 55 16-ton wagons. To prevent nuisance in the valley from the station, an unusually high single chimney of 400 ft has been built, and the cooling tower sites built by Davenport Engineering were also carefully sited for the same reason.

The generating capacity, electricity output and thermal efficiency were as shown in the table.

Year	Net capability, MW	Electricity supplied, GWh	Load as per cent of capability, %	Thermal efficiency, %
1960/1	180	1354.533	92.1	29.56
1961/2	180	1361.476	92.5	29.42
1962/3	180	1233.410	83.81	29.06
1966/7	180	1234.99	83.9	29.19
1971/2	180	732.597	49.6	27.11
1978/9	180	695.019	47.2	27.01
1981/2	180	496.220	33.7	27.34

Coal from the Yorkshire coalfields was delivered by train on the adjacent Calder Valley Line and moved around the site using 0-4-0 shunters. Elland No. 1, a CEGB 0-4-0 diesel shunter is preserved at Mangapps Railway Museum, Burnham-on-Crouch, Essex.

On 22 November 1971, the station's conveyor belt was destroyed in a fire. After the UK's electric supply industry was privatised in 1989, the station was operated by PowerGen. The station closed in 1991 before being demolished in 1996. The station's site is now the site of Lowfields Industrial Estate although the associated switching substation was retained and remains in use.
