= The Fragile (O'Hooley & Tidow album) =

Studio album by O'Hooley & Tidow
- Released: 9 February 2012 (UK)
- Recorded: Golcar, Huddersfield, West Yorkshire
- Genre: Folk; chamber folk
- Length: 50:48
- Label: No Masters (NMCD39)

O'Hooley & Tidow chronology
Silent June (2010)	The Fragile (2012)	The Hum (2014)

Singles from The Fragile
- 1. ""Gentleman Jack"/ "The Last Polar Bear" (digital download)" Released: 4 November 2012

Professional ratings
Review scores
Source	Rating
The Guardian	4/5 stars

The Fragile, the second album by the folk music duo O'Hooley & Tidow, was released on 9 February 2012 on the No Masters label. It received a four-starred review in The Guardian. The album's title is derived from the words of one of its songs, "Mein Deern", about the dying hours of Heidi Tidow's German grandmother. "Gentleman Jack", a song from the album, subsequently featured as the closing theme for the BBC/HBO television series Gentleman Jack. The album features guest performances by Andy Cutting, Jackie Oates, Jude Abbott, Cormac Byrne, Anna Esslemont, Sam Pegg, The Solo Players and London's Diversity Choir.

== Theme and songs ==
According to O'Hooley & Tidow, all the songs on The Fragile are linked by the common theme of vulnerability.

A single from the album, "The Last Polar Bear", was released in November 2011. The track was reissued on 1 November 2012 as a double single with "Gentleman Jack", a song, also from the album, about Anne Lister, an early 19th-century Yorkshire lesbian gentlewoman. "Gentleman Jack" subsequently featured as the closing theme for the BBC/HBO television series Gentleman Jack, which was broadcast from 2019 to 2022.

The words of "Little Boy Blue" are from a 19th-century poem by the American writer, Eugene Field. The poem, about a young boy and his toys, suggests that he dies and is taken by angels and his toys wait for him to return.

"She Lived Beside the Anner" is a traditional folk song from Tipperary, Ireland.

== Reception ==
In a four-starred review, Robin Denselow of The Guardian described The Fragile as an "intriguing, ambitious set" and said that the album's cover version of Massive Attack's "Teardrop" was "an exquisite reworking". Guardian music critic Jude Rogers voted it as one of the best tracks of 2012.

Northern Sky praised the album's "complex string arrangements and fine instrumental accompaniment" and "highly accomplished pieces of musical composition; you can never second guess what's around the corner in terms of sonic exploration". Reviewing the album for Folking.com, Dai Jeffries said "The confidence, power and earthiness of their voices both solo and in harmony are what shine through this excellent album. Folk Wales Online described the album as a "beautiful, entrancing, hypnotic CD" and "breathtakingly original".

Northern Sky music magazine's reviewer described the song "The Last Polar Bear" as "utterly beautiful", saying "This is how love songs should be written".

Holger Brandstaedt, reviewing the album for FolkWorld, said: "The influence of the producer is unmistakable. Some of the tracks sound clearly by Chumbawamba, others have their godfathers in The Beautiful South".

== Track listing ==
1. "The Tallest Tree" (Belinda O'Hooley/Heidi Tidow) 4:34
2. "The Last Polar Bear" (Belinda O'Hooley/Heidi Tidow) 3:25
3. "Gentleman Jack" (Belinda O'Hooley/Heidi Tidow) 2:47
4. "Teardrop" (Robert Del Naja, Grantley Marshall, Andrew Vowles, Elizabeth Fraser) 1:33
5. "Little Boy Blue" (words from an 1888 poem by Eugene Field; music by Belinda O'Hooley/Heidi Tidow) 4:27
6. "Calling Me" (Belinda O'Hooley/Heidi Tidow) 5:52
7. "Mein Deern" (Belinda O'Hooley/Heidi Tidow) 7:20
8. "A Daytrip" (Belinda O'Hooley/Heidi Tidow) 4:15
9. "Pass It On" (Belinda O'Hooley/Heidi Tidow) 3:14
10. "She Lived Beside the Anner" (traditional, arranged by Belinda O'Hooley/Heidi Tidow) 4:17
11. "Ronnie's Song" (Belinda O'Hooley/Heidi Tidow) 6:28
12. "Madgie in the Summerlands" (Belinda O'Hooley, Heidi Tidow, James Dumbelton, Jackie Oates) 2:32

Total album length = 50:48

== Personnel ==
=== O'Hooley & Tidow ===
- Belinda O'Hooley – vocals, piano, dampened piano, accordion, hand claps
- Heidi Tidow – vocals, bells, guitar

=== Other musicians ===
- Jude Abbott – euphonium, flugelhorn, cornet
- Cormac Byrne – bodhrán, drums, percussion
- Andy Cutting – diatonic button accordion
- Anna Esslemont – violin
- Diversity Choir – vocals (arranged and directed by Andrea Brown)
- Jackie Oates – bass; lead vocals on "Madgie in the Summerlands"
- Sam Pegg – bass
- Solo Players – strings (Adam Robinson, James Pattinson – violin; Jayne Coyle – viola; Martin Couzin – cello; Mel Purves – arrangements)

== Production and release ==
The album was recorded at Belinda O'Hooley and Heidi Tidow's home in Golcar, West Yorkshire, in September and October 2011 and also at Hill Top Studio, Leeds. Diversity Choir's contribution was recorded live at St Anne's Church, Soho, London. The album was mixed and mastered by Neil Ferguson of Chumbawamba at Hill Top Studio, Leeds. and was released on 9 February 2012 on the No Masters label.

The illustrations on the cover, which was designed by Boff Whalley, are by Kate Aughey. The photographs of O'Hooley & Tidow standing in the sea were taken by Casey Orr at Sandsend in Whitby.
