= Silent June =

Studio album by O'Hooley & Tidow
- Released: 22 February 2010 (UK)
- Recorded: August – November 2009 at Golcar, Huddersfield (except for the string quartet, which was recorded at Hill Top Studios, Leeds)
- Genre: Folk
- Label: No Masters
- Producer: Belinda O'Hooley and Heidi Tidow

O'Hooley & Tidow chronology
Silent June (2010)	The Fragile (2012)

Professional ratings
Review scores
Source	Rating
Financial Times	4/5 stars

Silent June is the first album by O'Hooley & Tidow. Recorded between August and November 2009 at their home in Golcar, Huddersfield, it was released on 22 February 2010 on the No Masters label, distributed by Proper Records.

The album, which was mixed and mastered by Neil Ferguson of Chumbawamba, also featured Anna Esslemont and Cormac Byrne (both from Uiscedwr), Jackie Oates and the Solo Players string quartet.

It was critically acclaimed and received a four-starred review in the Financial Times.

== Songs ==
The title of the album refers to the words of one of the songs on the album, "Que Sera", about the execution during World War I of the British nurse Edith Cavell. Belinda O'Hooley says that "Que Sera" seeks to portray "the horrors of war from a woman's perspective" and "explores the feelings, sounds and senses that Edith Cavell may have felt as she stood before a firing squad".

The album also includes a version of the song "Spancil Hill" and a new song "Too Old to Dream" incorporating a segment of "When I Grow Too Old to Dream", a popular song with music by Sigmund Romberg and lyrics by Oscar Hammerstein II, published in 1934 and recorded by many artists, most notably Gracie Fields.

== Reception ==
Colin Irwin, for BBC Music, said: "Too Old to Dream is a sentimental, yet still intensely moving picture of faded memories, melded into the old Sigmund Romberg/Oscar Hammerstein II standard and a recording of a Dewsbury care home resident....One More Xmas might also one day be recognised as a classic. Thoughtful, provocative, yearning and deeply poignant, it’ll resonate with anyone who's lost a loved one or wilts under grown-up responsibilities, and may just be the best seasonal song written since Fairytale of New York."

Neil Spencer, writing in The Observer, said: "The spare, dramatic piano parts that Belinda O'Hooley formerly brought to the Unthanks have grown into rippling, neo-classical arrangements on this first album with fellow singer and songwriter Heidi Tidow... A bold, unsettling debut."

David Honigmann, reviewing the album for the Financial Times, gave it four stars, and said "the deceptively light 'Shelter Me' is a memorably off-beat love song...O’Hooley unfolds a gorgeous piano melody."

Peter Culshaw of The Arts Desk described Silent June as a "low-key but intensely beautiful and poetic album...the piano, adventurous bracing strings and vocals give it a semi-classical feel."

It was one of Mojo magazine's Top 10 Folk Albums of 2010 and won "Best Debut" in the Spiral Awards, organised by Spiral Earth.

== Track listing ==
1. "Flight of the Petrel" (O'Hooley/Tidow) (6:38)
2. "All Stand in Line" (O'Hooley) (4:59)
3. "Shelter Me" (O'Hooley/Tidow) (3:42)
4. "Banjololo" (Traditional, arranged by O'Hooley/Tidow) (0:35)
5. "Spancil Hill" (Traditional, arranged by O'Hooley/Tidow/Dumbelton/Oates) (4:20)
6. "Too Old to Dream" (O'Hooley/Tidow/Romberg/Hammerstein II) (7:44)
7. "Hidden from the Sun" (O'Hooley/Tidow) (7:33)
8. "Que Sera" (O'Hooley/Tidow) (6:12)
9. "Beautiful Danger" (O'Hooley) (3:54)
10. "One More Xmas" (O'Hooley) (5:19)
11. "Cold and Stiff" (O'Hooley) (2:14)

== Personnel ==
=== O'Hooley & Tidow ===
- Belinda O'Hooley – vocals, piano, dampened piano, piano chimes, hand claps
- Heidi Tidow – vocals, hand claps

=== Other musicians ===
- Anna Esslemont – violin, hand claps
- Cormac Byrne – bodhran, cajon, percussion, hand claps
- James Dumbelton – guitar
- Jackie Oates – octave fiddle
- James Budden – bass
- Nia Bevan, Raymond Lester, Jayne Coyle, Damion Browne – string quartet
- Irene Rourke from Barking Banks Care Home, Dewsbury – vocals at intro to "Too Old to Dream"

== Production ==
The album (except for the string quartet, which was recorded at Hill Top Studios, Leeds) was recorded at West End Studios, Golcar by Belinda O'Hooley from August to November 2009. It was produced by Belinda O'Hooley & Heidi Tidow.

== Cover artwork ==
The album's cover, designed by Boff Whalley, incorporated photographs by Casey Orr.
