= The Hum (O'Hooley & Tidow album) =

Studio album by O'Hooley & Tidow
- Released: 17 February 2014 (UK)
- Recorded: Golcar, Huddersfield and Tunehouse Studio, London
- Genre: Folk; singer-songwriter
- Label: No Masters
- Producer: Gerry Diver

O'Hooley & Tidow chronology
The Fragile (2012)	The Hum (2014)	Summat's Brewin' (2015)

Professional ratings
Review scores
Source	Rating
The Irish Times	4/5 stars
The Guardian	4/5 stars

The Hum, the third album by the folk music duo O'Hooley & Tidow, was released on 17 February 2014 and received four-starred reviews in The Guardian and The Irish Times. Inspired by the sights and sounds of the Colne Valley, it has been described as "a collection of songs paying homage to the West Riding village of Golcar", the former industrial village in the West Riding of Yorkshire where Belinda O'Hooley and Heidi Tidow then lived.

== Production ==
The vocals, piano, electric piano and accordion on the album were recorded in Golcar, Huddersfield, by Belinda O'Hooley, Heidi Tidow and Neil Ferguson of Chumbawamba. The other instruments were arranged, performed and recorded at Tunehouse Studio, London, by Gerry Diver, who also mixed and produced the album there. The design was by Martin Rowsell at Simply Marvellous Music.

== Release ==
The album was released on 17 February 2014 on the No Masters label. Two songs from the album – "Summat's Brewin'" and "Peculiar Brood" – were released as a single on 20 July 2014. A live version of "Summat's Brewin'" was included on their album of the same name, released in August 2015.

On 7 September 2014 O'Hooley & Tidow released a video of a live performance of "Peculiar Brood", a portrayal of suicide bombing from a mother’s perspective, using bird imagery. It was filmed by Minster Studios at Holy Trinity Church, Leeds.

== Reception ==
The Hum received a four-starred review in The Irish Times.

In a four-starred review in The Guardian, Robin Denselow described it as the duo's most experimental album to date, with "thoughtful, inventive songs about industry, migrant workers and war alongside a sturdy tribute to Pussy Riot; an exquisite lament about motherhood and sacrifice; a mystical love story about a fox who becomes a woman, and a haunting treatment of Ruins By the Shore, the Nic Jones song of time and decay. Surely one of the albums of the year".

== Personnel ==
O'Hooley & Tidow

- Belinda O'Hooley – vocals, piano, electric piano, accordion
- Heidi Tidow – vocals

Additional musicians

- Gerry Diver – fiddle & string section, tenor and bass guitars, pedal steel, bouzouki, Fender Rhodes, autoharp, drums, percussion, programming

== Track listing ==
1. "The Hum" (O'Hooley/Tidow) (4.02)
2. "Just a Note" (Ewan MacColl) (3.02)
3. "Summat's Brewin'" (verses O'Hooley/Tidow; chorus traditional (Roud 203; G/D 3:590); arrangement Belinda O’Hooley, Heidi Tidow, Gerry Diver) (3.10)
4. "Two Mothers" (Belinda O’Hooley, Heidi Tidow, Jackie Oates) (5.48)
5. "Peculiar Brood" (O'Hooley/Tidow) (3.10)
6. "Like Horses" (O'Hooley/Tidow) (4.35)
7. "Come Down from the Moor" (O'Hooley/Tidow) (4.56)
8. "Coil & Spring" (lyrics: Boff Whalley; music: O'Hooley/Tidow) (3.56)
9. "Ruins By the Shore" (Nic Jones) (4.17)
10. "Kitsune" (O'Hooley/Tidow) (6.05)
