= O'Hooley & Tidow =

English musicians

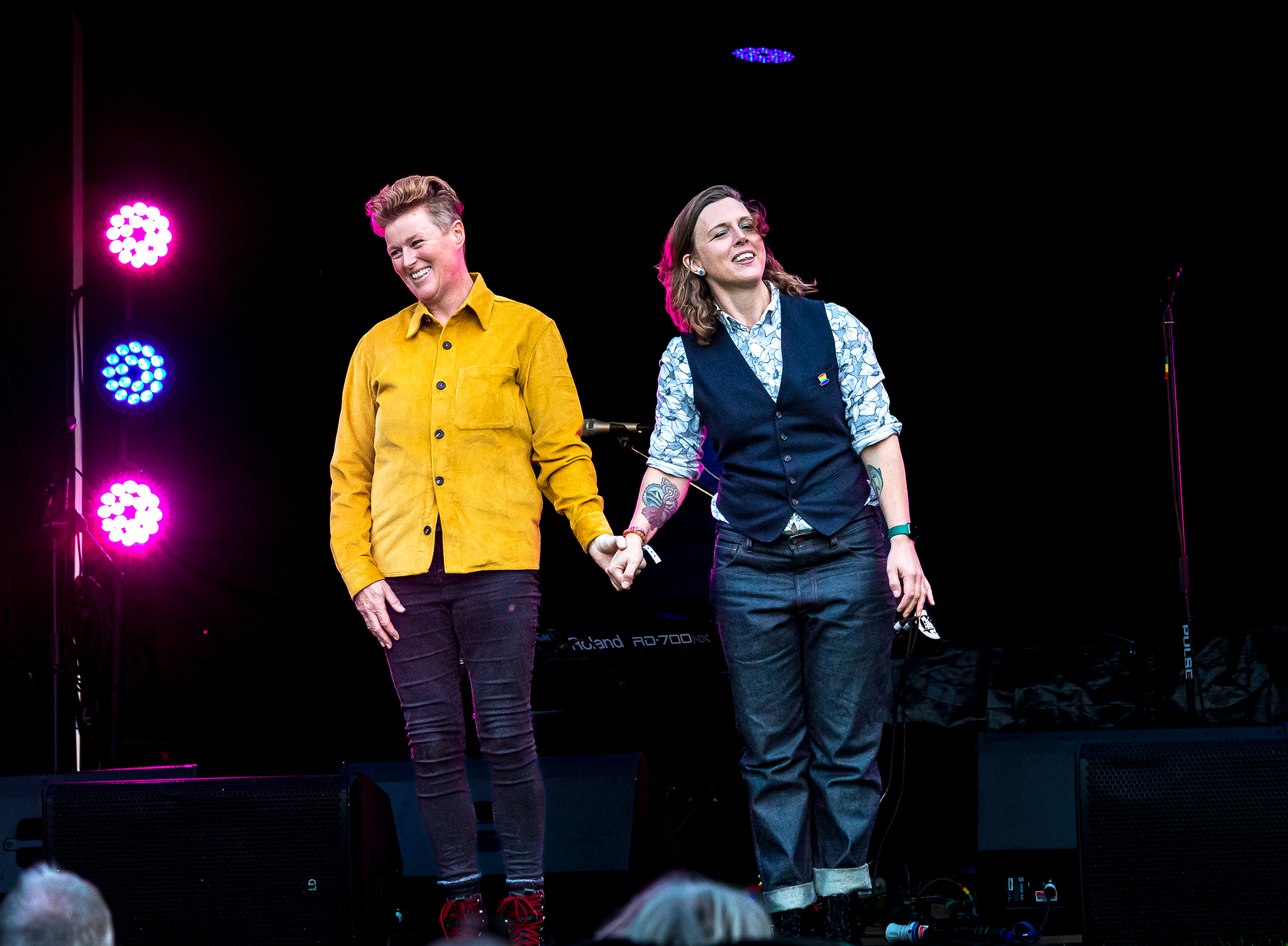
- O'Hooley & Tidow in 2025

Background information
- Origin: Huddersfield, West Yorkshire, England
- Genres: Folk, chamber folk
- Years active: 2009–present
- Label: No Masters
- Members: Belinda O'Hooley (b.1974); Heidi Tidow (b. 1983)
- Website: ohooleyandtidow.com

O'Hooley & Tidow is an English folk music duo from Yorkshire. Singer-songwriter Heidi Tidow (pronounced Tee-doe or Tee-dov) performs and records with her wife, singer-songwriter and pianist Belinda O'Hooley, who was formerly a member of Rachel Unthank and the Winterset (now The Unthanks). O'Hooley & Tidow were nominated for Best Duo at the 2013 BBC Radio 2 Folk Awards. Their 2016 album Shadows was given a five-star review in The Guardian, and four of their other albums, including their 2017 release WinterFolk Volume 1, have received four-star reviews in the British national press. From 2019 to 2022, their song "Gentleman Jack", from the album The Fragile, featured as the closing theme for the BBC/HBO television series Gentleman Jack. Their album Cloudheads was released on 21 April 2023.

== History ==
Belinda O'Hooley and Heidi Tidow, who were both brought up in Yorkshire, met in Huddersfield in 2005 and started songwriting and performing together in 2009. They share a traditional Irish music background, and have family in County Sligo and County Galway. Tidow also has German heritage on her mother's side.

== Live performances ==
The Guardian's Jude Rogers described O'Hooley & Tidow as the weekend's "best band" at the 2012 Cambridge Folk Festival. Colin Irwin, reviewing the acts at the 2014 Cambridge Folk Festival, praised O'Hooley & Tidow's "fine set".

== Recordings ==
=== Silent June ===
Between August and November 2009 at their then-home in Golcar, Huddersfield, they recorded an album, Silent June, which was released on 22 February 2010 to critical acclaim, including a four-star review in the Financial Times. It was one of MOJO magazine's Top 10 Folk Albums of 2010 and won "Best Debut" in the Spiral Awards, organised by Spiral Earth. O'Hooley & Tidow also won the FATEA Innovation Award 2010, an award for music believed to broaden the appeal of roots-based music.

Silent June was mixed and mastered by Neil Ferguson of Chumbawamba, and also featured Anna Esslemont and Cormac Byrne (both from Uiscedwr), Jackie Oates and the Solo Players string quartet. Its title refers to the words of one of the songs on the album, "Que Sera", about the execution during the First World War of the British nurse Edith Cavell. (Note: O'Hooley says that "Que Sera" seeks to portray "the horrors of war from a woman's perspective" and "explores the feelings, sounds and senses that Edith Cavell may have felt as she stood before a firing squad"."O'Hooley & Tidow". Gayleeds.com. 2010. Archived from the original on 21 February 2025.) The album also includes a version of the song "Spancil Hill" and a new song, "Too Old to Dream", incorporating a segment of "When I Grow Too Old to Dream", a popular song with music by Sigmund Romberg and lyrics by Oscar Hammerstein II, published in 1934 and recorded by many artists, most notably Gracie Fields.

=== The Fragile ===
O'Hooley & Tidow released a single, "The Last Polar Bear", in November 2011. The song was taken from their second album, The Fragile, featuring Andy Cutting, Jackie Oates, Anna Esslemont and Cormac Byrne, which was released in February 2012. Northern Sky music magazine's reviewer described the song as "utterly beautiful", saying "This is how love songs should be written."

The track was issued in November 2012 as a double single with "Gentleman Jack". That song, also from the album, is about Anne Lister, an early 19th-century Yorkshire lesbian gentlewoman; in 2019, it was chosen to be played over the closing credits of the BBC One/HBO television series Gentleman Jack. The album also includes a cover version of Massive Attack's "Teardrop", voted by music critic Jude Rogers of The Guardian as one of the best tracks of 2012.

In a four-star review, Robin Denselow of The Guardian described the album as an "intriguing, ambitious set".

=== The Hum ===
Their third album, The Hum, was released on 17 February 2014 and received a four-star review in The Irish Times. In a four-star review for The Guardian, Denselow described it as the duo's most experimental album to date with "thoughtful, inventive songs about industry, migrant workers and war alongside a sturdy tribute to Pussy Riot; an exquisite lament about motherhood and sacrifice; a mystical love story about a fox who becomes a woman, and a haunting treatment of Ruins By the Shore, the Nic Jones song of time and decay. Surely one of the albums of the year."

Two songs from the album – "Summat's Brewin'" and "Peculiar Brood" – were released as a single on 20 July 2014. On 7 September 2014 they released a video of a live performance of "Peculiar Brood", a portrayal of suicide bombing from a mother's perspective, using bird imagery. It was filmed by Minster Studios at Holy Trinity Church, Leeds.

=== "The Pixie" ===
In November 2014 O'Hooley & Tidow released a video recording, filmed by Minster Studios at Holy Trinity Church, Leeds, of a brand new song, "The Pixie", that had been commissioned by Billy Bragg and 14-18 NOW to commemorate the First World War at Glastonbury Festival.

=== Summat's Brewin' ===
The duo's fourth album, Summat's Brewin', was released in August 2015 in a limited edition of 1,000 signed copies. The songs on the album explore society's fascination with drink, drinking and real ale. David Kidman, for Folk Radio UK, described it as an "exceptional recording" that faithfully captures the "sheer ebullient inventiveness of the duo's musical settings, their committed sense of fun, their consummate, enviable musicality, their serious ability to grab your attention and carry you through the experience".

=== Shadows ===
O'Hooley and Tidow's fifth album, Shadows, was released at the Cambridge Folk Festival in July 2016. It received a five-star review from Robin Denselow in The Guardian. Colin Irwin, reviewing the album for Mojo, said that "the overriding tone of this album is as deep and subtly dramatic as the piano instrumental that gives the long-player its title".

=== WinterFolk Volume 1 ===
Their sixth album, WinterFolk Volume 1, released on 3 November 2017, reflects on "some of the darker hued aspects of yuletide, considering the season in an alternative, real way, from the absence or loss of children, to domestic violence at Christmas, from global warming to poverty, religion, displacement, migration and loneliness". It received a four-star review in The Guardian from Jude Rogers, who said: "Belinda O’Hooley and Heidi Tidow's festive offering is piano-drizzled and string-glistened, its sound as comforting on the ears as favourite jumpers on the body on dark, icy mornings. Comprising reimaginings of their back catalogue, plus a few traditionals and modern covers, some of its subjects are tougher than you'd expect".

=== Live at St George's ===
Their seventh album, Live at St George's, consisting of live recordings at St George's, Bristol, was released in September 2020.

=== "Chimneys, Moors & Me" ===
In 2021 they released a single, "Chimneys, Moors & Me", which was commissioned by Pennine Prospects for the launch of the South Pennines National Park.

=== "The Ballad of Anne and Ann" ===
In December 2022 they released a single "The Ballad of Anne and Ann" which also featured Suranne Jones, who portrayed Anne Lister in the BBC/HBO series Gentleman Jack. The single was recorded at Dean Street Studios in Soho, London.

=== Cloudheads ===
Their eighth album, Cloudheads, was released on 21 April 2023.

== Recordings with Coven ==
=== Unholy Choir ===
With Grace Petrie, and Rowan Rheingans, Hazel Askew and Hannah James of Lady Maisery, performing as Coven, they released an album, Unholy Choir, in March 2017.

== Other musical contributions ==
O'Hooley & Tidow also feature on Chumbawamba's album ABCDEFG (2010) and DVD Going, Going – Live at Leeds City Varieties (2012), Lucy Ward's debut album Adelphi Has to Fly (2011) and Patsy Matheson's Domino Girls (2014).

In 2019, it was announced that their song "Gentleman Jack" from the album The Fragile would feature as the closing theme for the BBC/HBO television series Gentleman Jack.

== Discography ==
=== O'Hooley and Tidow ===
Title	Format	Release date	Label	Notes
Silent June	studio album	22 February 2010	No Masters (NMCD 32), distributed by Proper Records	
"The Last Polar Bear"	single (download)	21 November 2011	No Masters	
The Fragile	studio album	9 February 2012	No Masters (NMCD 39)	Includes "Gentleman Jack", used from 2019 to 2022 as the closing theme song of the BBC One/HBO television series Gentleman Jack
"Gentleman Jack"/ "The Last Polar Bear"	single (download)	4 November 2012	No Masters	
The Hum	studio album	17 February 2014	No Masters (NMCD 41)	
The Mark Radcliffe Folk Sessions: O'Hooley & Tidow	MP3 mini-album	4 May 2014	Delphonic Records (DELPH 094)	Contains three live tracks: "Summat's Brewin'", "The Hum" and "Two Mothers"
"Summat's Brewin'"/ "Peculiar Brood"	single (download)	20 July 2014	No Masters	
"Peculiar Brood"	video (live performance)	7 October 2014		Filmed by Minster Studios at Holy Trinity Church, Leeds
"The Pixie"	video (live performance)	2 November 2014		Filmed by Minster Studios at Holy Trinity Church, Leeds
Summat's Brewin'	studio album	August 2015	Hum Records (HUM 01)	Released in a limited edition of 1,000 signed copies. The album includes a live version of the song "Summat's Brewin'"
Shadows	studio album	29 July 2016	No Masters (NMCD 47)	
WinterFolk Volume 1	studio album	3 November 2017	No Masters (NMCD 51)	
Live at St George's	live album	11 September 2020	No Masters (NMCD 55)	Recorded at St George's Bristol
"Chimneys, Moors & Me"	single (download)	8 September 2021	No Masters	Commissioned by Pennine Prospects for the launch of the South Pennines National Park
"The Ballad of Anne and Ann"	single (download)	16 December 2022	No Masters	Features Suranne Jones, the actor who portrayed Anne Lister in the BBC/HBO series Gentleman Jack
Cloudheads	studio album	21 April 2023	No Masters (NMCD 57)	

=== Coven ===
Title	Format	Release date	Label
Unholy Choir	EP	19 March 2017	own label COVENCD01

== Personal life ==
Belinda O'Hooley and Heidi Tidow live in Marsden, West Yorkshire. Their son, Flynn, was born in September 2019.
