= WinterFolk Volume 1 =

Studio album by O'Hooley & Tidow
- Released: 3 November 2017 (UK)
- Genre: Christmas music; folk; singer-songwriter
- Label: No Masters (NMCD51)

O'Hooley & Tidow chronology
| Shadows (2016) | WinterFolk Volume 1 (2017) | Live at St George's (2020) |

Professional ratings
Review scores
| Source | Rating |
|---|---|
| Louder Than War | 9/10 stars |
| The Guardian | 4/5 stars |

WinterFolk Volume 1, the sixth album by the Yorkshire-based folk music duo O'Hooley & Tidow, was released on 3 November 2017 on the No Masters label and distributed by Proper Music. The album is described as reflecting on "some of the darker hued aspects of yuletide, considering the season in an alternative, real way, from the absence or loss of children, to domestic violence at Christmas, from global warming to poverty, religion, displacement, migration and loneliness".

== Reception ==
In a four-starred review for The Guardian, Jude Rogers said that "Belinda O’Hooley and Heidi Tidow’s festive offering is piano-drizzled and string-glistened, its sound as comforting on the ears as favourite jumpers on the body on dark, icy mornings. Comprising reimaginings of their back catalogue, plus a few traditionals and modern covers, some of its subjects are tougher than you’d expect".

Mike Ainscoe, reviewing the album for Louder Than War, said: "Nostalgic and moving, a seasonal album for our times, WinterFolk might just be [O'Hooley & Tidow] bettering the best they’ve done".

In a review for Folk Radio UK, Thomas Blake said: "The beauty and importance of this album lies partly in the fact that O’Hooley and Tidow recognise that an appreciation of this time of year – whether you want to call it Christmastime or not – is based on both personal and universal factors. There is the Christmas of public consciousness and, to borrow a phrase from that underwhelming Bob Dylan album, a Christmas in the heart. WinterFolk Volume 1 succeeds in uniting these factors while never sidestepping the important and often unsavoury social issues that come to the fore in the holiday season. Much more than just a stocking filler, this is an album of frosted beauty with a heart as warm as a coal fire."

== Songs ==
The album includes a version of Steve Ashley's song "Fire and Wine" from his 1974 album Stroll On. In his review for Folk Radio UK, Thomas Blake said: "in O’Hooley and Tidow’s hands, it becomes a sparkling, stately midwinter dream. Critical to the song’s success is the way it recognises the hardship of the season – the timeless image of the hungry robin, ‘see-sawing in one half of a coconut shell’, the cruelty of December frosts – without which the warmth and festivity would mean nothing".

The original version of O'Hooley's song "Whitethorn" (reworked for this release) appeared on Rachel Unthank and the Winterset's 2007 album The Bairns.

== Track listing ==
1. "Fire and Wine" (Steve Ashley) 4:39
2. "The Last Polar Bear" (Belinda O'Hooley and Heidi Tidow) 4:28
3. "One More Xmas" (Belinda O'Hooley) 5:56
4. "Winter Folk Carol" (Belinda O'Hooley and Heidi Tidow) 3:20
5. "Coventry Carol" (traditional, arranged by Belinda O'Hooley: piano instrumental) 4:04
6. "Calling Me" (Belinda O'Hooley and Heidi Tidow) 6:07
7. "Whitethorn" (Belinda O'Hooley) 5:01
8. "Stille Nacht" (traditional, arranged by Belinda O'Hooley and Heidi Tidow) 3:48
9. "We Sing Hallelujah" (Richard Thompson) 3:19
10. "Wexford Lullaby" (John Renbourn) 4:00
11. "Fairytale of New York" (Jem Finer and Shane MacGowan) 6:56
12. "Stille Nacht Surprise" (traditional, arranged by Belinda O'Hooley and Heidi Tidow) 1:18

== Personnel ==
- Belinda O'Hooley – vocals, piano, programming, accordion
- Heidi Tidow – vocals, guitar, bells
- Jo Silverston – cello
- Anna Jenkins – violin, viola
- Jude Abbott – flugelhorn, euphonium, backing vocals
- Neil Ferguson – backing vocals

== Album design ==
Martin Rowsell at Simply Marvellous Music designed the album cover. The cover photograph, by David Firn, was taken at The Old Queen's Head, Islington, London in 2012; the other photographs on the album packaging were by Bryan Ledgard and Belinda O'Hooley. Heidi Tidow wrote the sleeve notes.
