= Inversions (album) =

Studio album by Belinda O'Hooley
- Released: 28 June 2019 (UK)
- Venues: MOMA, Wales
- Label: No Masters (NMCD53)
- Producer: Heidi Tidow

Belinda O'Hooley chronology
Music Is My Silence (2005)	Inversions (2019)

Professional ratings
Review scores
Source	Rating
Morning Star	4/5 stars

Inversions is an album, released on 28 June 2019, by British singer-songwriter and pianist Belinda O'Hooley. Jude Rogers in The Guardian called it "a set of beautiful piano and spoken-word pieces". Mike Ainscoe, for Louder Than War, described it "a series of touching and heartfelt outpourings...Revealing and yes, in a way, cathartic, Inversions captures Belinda O'Hooley at her most insightful".

In a four-starred review for the Morning Star, Steve Johnson said: "This mainly instrumental solo album showcases O'Hooley's talents as a pianist and composer, inspired by her family musical heritage following the death of her father in 2017. The Swallows Tail and The Bonny Boy come from her father's musical background in the rural Irish west, while Cadair Idris and Aran Fawddwy are inspired by the mountains and valleys of Snowdonia where the album was recorded...as an instrumental album this is an enjoyable and relaxing experience from an artist at the height of her powers."

== Track listing ==
Track listing	Title	Writer	Duration
1	Inside a Soul	Belinda O'Hooley	2.22
2	Felingerrig	Belinda O'Hooley	3.34
3	The Swallow's Tail	traditional, arranged by Belinda O'Hooley	3.46
4	Dilin O' Deamhas	traditional, arranged by Belinda O'Hooley	3.50
5	Skibbereen	traditional, arranged by Belinda O'Hooley	4.30
6	Aran Fawddwy	Heidi Tidow	4.30
7	Hawkward	Belinda O'Hooley	3.55
8	Cadair Idris	Belinda O'Hooley	4.11
9	The Applecross Inn	traditional, arranged by Belinda O'Hooley	4.08
10	The Hills of Greenmore	traditional, arranged by Belinda O'Hooley	3.32
11	Pipistrelles at 6 pm	Belinda O'Hooley	1.46
12	The Bonny Boy	traditional, arranged by Belinda O'Hooley	3.51
13	My Father's Reel	Belinda O'Hooley	6.47

== Musicians ==
- Belinda O'Hooley: piano, vocals, accordion, percussion
- Heidi Tidow: backing vocals, spoken word
- Michael McGoldrick: uilleann pipes, whistle

== Production and design ==
The album was recorded and produced by Heidi Tidow, and was mixed and mastered by Neil Ferguson.

Martin Roswell at Simply Marvellous Music undertook the CD design and layout. The cover artwork is by Kate Aughey, with photographs by Hannah Webster, Belinda O'Hooley and Heidi Tidow. The sleeve notes are by Belinda O'Hooley.
