= Summat's Brewin' =

Studio album by O'Hooley & Tidow
- Released: August 2015 (UK)
- Recorded: Golcar, Huddersfield, West Yorkshire; one track recorded live in Saltaire
- Genres: Folk; singer-songwriter
- Label: Hum

O'Hooley & Tidow chronology
The Hum (2014)	Summat's Brewin' (2015)	Shadows (2016)

Professional ratings
Review scores
Source	Rating
Louder Than War	9/10 stars

Summat's Brewin', the fourth album by the Yorkshire-based folk music duo O'Hooley & Tidow, was released in August 2015 in a limited edition of 1,000 signed copies. The songs on the album explore society’s fascination with drink, drinking and real ale.

== Production and release ==
The live performance on the album was recorded on 26 June 2015 at The Live Room, Caroline Social Club, Saltaire. The album was recorded by Belinda O'Hooley and Heidi Tidow at West End Studio, Golcar and was mixed and mastered by Neil Ferguson (formerly a member of Chumbawamba).

The album was released in August 2015 on the duo's own Hum record label (HUM01). The design and layout of the CD was by Martin Rowsell of Simply Marvellous Music. The photographs on the album sleeve are by Bryan Ledgard.

== Reception ==
Michael Ainscoe, in a review for Louder Than War, described the songs on the album as "typical O’H&T – from the sharp and well observed to the touching and sensitive. From sources as rich as the traditional to Belinda’s dad, cover versions and a couple of originals thrown in for good measure, this is a collection which surprises and warms more like a nice short than a well brewed pint".

Ciaran Algar, reviewing the album for Bright Young Folk, described it as "a fine collection of songs" of which "the stand-out track [is] Down where the Drunkards Roll. Whilst O’Hooley and Tidow are able to deliver the uplifting and humorous songs with gusto, they are at their best when they slow things down and bring attention to Belinda’s piano playing and to their stunning harmonies. This track just breathes simplicity, and is delivered beautifully."

David Kidman, for Folk Radio UK, described it as an "exceptional recording" that faithfully captures the "sheer ebullient inventiveness of the duo’s musical settings, their committed sense of fun, their consummate, enviable musicality, their serious ability to grab your attention and carry you through the experience".

== Personnel ==
- Belinda O'Hooley – vocals, piano, keyboard, synthesisers, accordion, percussion, kazoo
- Heidi Tidow – vocals, guitar, percussion, bells, kazoo

== Track listing ==
1. "White Winos" (Loudon Wainwright III) 3.12
2. "Three Drunken Maidens" (Roud 252) (Traditional, arr. O'Hooley/Tidow) 2.34
3. "Between the Bars" (Elliott Smith) 3.44
4. "The Copper" (Belinda O'Hooley) 4.26
5. "Murphy's Saloon" (Traditional, arr. O'Hooley/Tidow) 0.38
6. "All for Me Grog" (Roud 475; G/D 3:580) (Traditional, arr. O'Hooley/Tidow) 3.17
7. "Down Where the Drunkards Roll" (Richard Thompson) 4.33
8. "The Wild Rover" (Roud 1173; G/D 7:1480) (Traditional, arr. O'Hooley/Tidow) 4.22
9. "The Passenger" (O'Hooley/Tidow) 4.44
10. "The Rakes of Mallow" (Traditional, arr. O'Hooley) 0.50
11. "Last Orders" (O'Hooley & Tidow) 3.31
12. "Summat's Brewin'" (live) (O'Hooley/Tidow) 4.11
13. "The Parting Glass" (Roud 3004; G/D 8:1531) (Traditional, arr. O'Hooley/Tidow) 2.34
