= Shadows (O'Hooley & Tidow album) =

Studio album by O'Hooley & Tidow
- Released: 29 July 2016
- Genre: Folk; singer-songwriter
- Label: No Masters (NMCD47)

O'Hooley & Tidow chronology
| Summat's Brewin' (2015) | Shadows (2016) | WinterFolk Volume 1 (2017) |

Professional ratings
Review scores
| Source | Rating |
|---|---|
| The Guardian | 5/5 stars |
| MOJO | 4/5 stars |
| The Press (York) | 4/5 stars |

Shadows, the fifth album by the Yorkshire-based folk music duo O'Hooley & Tidow, was released on 29 July 2016 on the No Masters label.

== Reception ==
In a five-starred review for The Guardian, Robin Denselow said that O'Hooley & Tidow "sing together with the ease of a married couple, matching delicate and increasingly brave harmony vocals against O’Hooley’s thoughtful piano work. And they are exceptional songwriters, as they prove with this unusual set". In a four-starred review for Mojo, Colin Irwin said that "the overriding tone of this album is as deep and subtly dramatic as the piano instrumental that gives the long-player its title".

== Track listing ==
1. "Colne Valley Hearts" (O'Hooley/Tidow) (3.40)
2. "Made in England" (O'Hooley/Tidow) (3.40)
3. "Blanket" (O'Hooley/Tidow) (4.54)
4. "The Needle & the Hand" (O'Hooley/Tidow) (4.46)
5. "Small, Big Love" (Kathryn Williams/Graham Hardy) (3.30)
6. "Shadows" (Belinda O'Hooley) (4.14)
7. "Beryl" (O'Hooley/Tidow) (3.45)
8. "The Pixie" (O'Hooley/Tidow) (4.53)
9. "Reapers" (O'Hooley/Tidow) (4.58)
10. "The Dark Rolling Sea" (O'Hooley/Tidow) (2.36)
11. "River" (Joni Mitchell) (3.56)

== Songs ==
The album includes a song, "Small, Big Love", which Kathryn Williams presented to Belinda O'Hooley and Heidi Tidow at their wedding.

== Personnel ==
=== O'Hooley & Tidow ===
- Belinda O'Hooley – vocals, piano, programming, accordion
- Heidi Tidow – vocals, percussion

=== Other musicians ===
- Jude Abbott – trumpet, flugelhorn
- Hazel Askew – backing vocals
- Pete Flood – drums, percussion
- Hannah James – backing vocals
- Grace Petrie – vocals, backing vocals
- Rowan Rheingans – fiddle, viola, backing vocals
- Andy Seward – double bass
- Michele Stodart – electric bass, electric guitar, EBow
- Ben Stone – tattoo needle

== Production ==
The album was mixed by Neil Ferguson and mastered by Denis Blackham at Skye Mastering.The album cover was designed by Martin Rowsell of Simply Marvellous Music, incorporating photographs by Maisy Carr Photography; the sleeve notes were by Heidi Tidow.
