= The Joy of Living (Jackie Oates album) =

Studio album by Jackie Oates
- Released: 14nbsp; August 2018 (UK)
- Venue: Wallingford, Oxfordshire
- Genre: Folk music
- Label: ECC Records ECC018
- Producer: Simon Richmond

Jackie Oates chronology
The Spyglass & The Herringbone (2015)	The Joy of Living (2018)	Gracious Wings (2022)

Professional ratings
Review scores
Source	Rating
The Observer	4/5 stars
The Guardian	4/5 stars
Financial Times	3/5 stars

The Joy of Living, the seventh album by Jackie Oates, was released on 14 August 2018 by ECC Records. Its title, from the song written by Ewan MacColl, pays tribute to Oates' father, a morris dancer, melodeon player and classical guitarist, who died after contracting sepsis in January 2016, only a few days after Jackie Oates had given birth to her first child, Rosie; both she and Rosie had sepsis also, but recovered.

== Production ==
The album was recorded in August 2018 at Jackie Oates' house in Wallingford, Oxfordshire.

== Reception ==
In a four-starred review for The Observer, Neil Spencer described the album as "moody and affecting". Jude Rogers, reviewing the album for The Guardian, also gave it four stars, describing it as "an intensely personal folk gem". David Honigmann, for the Financial Times, awarded it three stars and said it is "a raw record, and all the better for it, but far from artless".

== Track listing ==
The Joy of Living track listing
No.	Title	Writer(s)	Length
1.	"Freedom Come-All-Ye"	Hamish Henderson	3.39
2.	"Spring Is Coming Soon"	Jackie Oates	2.26
3.	"Mother / Spring Is Coming Soon Reprise"	John Lennon/ Jackie Oates	6:14
4.	"Virginny (Roud 1488)"	traditional, arranged by Jackie Oates and Jack Rutter	3:12
5.	"Rosy Apple (Roud 6492)"	traditional, arranged by Jackie Oates and Jack Rutter	1:27
6.	"The Joy of Living"	Ewan MacColl	4:55
7.	"My Shoes Are Made of Spanish (Roud 13171)"	traditional, arranged by Jackie Oates, Jack Rutter and John Spiers	2:38
8.	"Unicorns"	Bill Caddick	4:13
9.	"Nay Ivy Nay"	words traditional, tune by Lorraine Irwing	2:53
10.	"Catch Me If You Can (Roud 1028)"	traditional, arranged by Jackie Oates	4:43
11.	"The Bird"	Lal Waterson	2:11
12.	"Hey Ho, to the Greenwood (Roud B221397)"	William Byrd	2:22
13.	"Constellations"	Darwin Deez	3:18
14.	"Sweet Farewell (Roud 6916)"	traditional, arranged by Jackie Oates	4:08
15.	"The Last Trip Home (Roud 16928)"	words by Davy Steele, music by John McCusker	3:51
16.	"Rolling Home"	John Tams	2:02

== Personnel ==
- Jackie Oates: vocals, five-string viola, bass violin, piano, recorders, harmonium, kantele
- Jack Rutter: guitar, banjo, bouzouki
- John Parker: double bass
- Barney Morse-Brown: cello
- Mike Cosgrave: piano
- John Spiers: melodeon
- Megan Henwood: backing vocals
- Simon Richmond: percussion, kantele
- Matt Allwright: pedal steel guitar
- Rosie Worth: baby/toddler noises
- Isabel Parker, Mabel Whitehead, Charlotte Hull, Alice Hull, Theo Bissell, Sethie Bissell, Danni King: children's voices
