= As the Light Draws In =

As The Light Draws In

Studio album by Belinda O'Hooley and Jackie Oates
- Released: 16 October 2026 (UK)
- Recorded: September 2026
- Studios: Sandhill Studio, Marsden, West Yorkshire
- Genre: Folk music
- Label: Needle Pin Records (NP4)
- Producers: Belinda O'Hooley and Jackie Oates

As the Light Draws In, the first joint album by Belinda O'Hooley and Jackie Oates, was released on 16 October 2026 by Needle Pin Records.

== Track listing ==
No.	Title	Writer(s)	Length
1.	"Bod and the Snail"	lyrics by Belinda O'Hooley; tune by Jackie Oates	4.38
2.	"Here We Come A-Wasslin’ (Roud 209)"	traditional, arranged by Belinda O'Hooley/Jackie Oates	5.25
3.	"The Slawit Alien"	Belinda O'Hooley	4.31
4.	"Piper Holes"	Belinda O'Hooley	4.07
5.	"As The Light Draws In"	words by Belinda O’Hooley/Jackie Oates; tune by Sara Isakkson	3.53
6.	"Peggy Gordon (Roud 2280)"	traditional, arranged by Belinda O'Hooley/Jackie Oates	5:25
7.	"Annachie Gordon (Roud 102; Child 239)"	traditional, arranged by Belinda O'Hooley/Jackie Oates	7.12
8.	"The Copper"	Belinda O'Hooley	4:01
9.	"Craz'd Kate"	words by Jackie Oates, from William Cowper’s 1785 poem The Task; traditional Irish tune "Bríd Thomáis Mhurcha" arranged by Belinda O'Hooley/Jackie Oates	4:27
10.	"Hawkward"	Belinda O'Hooley	4.21
11.	"Goodbye to Beesands and to Magic"	Jackie Oates	3.24
12.	"The Last Trip Home (Roud 16928)"	words by Davy Steele; music by John McCusker	5.08
13.	"Two Mothers"	words by Belinda O’Hooley/Heidi Tidow; traditional Irish tune "Eiochaill"	4.25

== Personnel ==
- Belinda O'Hooley: vocals, piano
- Jackie Oates: vocals, five-string viola

== Production ==
The album was recorded in September 2026 at Sandhill Studio, Marsden, West Yorkshire.

== Reception ==
Reviewing the album for folking.com, Dai Jeffries said: "Belinda and Jackie have covered a lot of ground on As The Light Draws In, both from their personal histories and in the geographical sense, too. There are some fine tracks and gorgeous performances here – simple and tender for the most part but sometimes, just sometimes, with an edge".
