= Slaithwaite Town Hall =

Municipal building in Slaithwaite, West Yorkshire, England

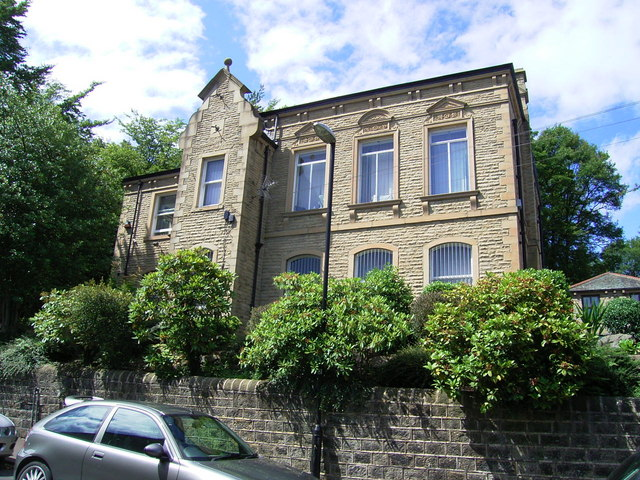
- Slaithwaite Town Hall

- Shown in West Yorkshire
- 53.6232°N 1.8809°W
- Location: Lewisham Road, Slaithwaite

History
- Built: 1892

Site notes
- Architect: James B. Eagland
- Architectural style: Neoclassical style

Slaithwaite Town Hall, also known as Empire House, is a former municipal building in Lewisham Road in the town of Slaithwaite, West Yorkshire, England. The building, which served as the offices of Colne Valley Urban District Council, is now a business centre.

== History ==
Following significant population growth, largely associated with the woollen industry, a local board of health was established in the Slaithwaite area in 1862. In the late 1880s, the local board decided to commission purpose-built public offices for the area: the site they chose was open land at the junction of Station Road and Lewisham Road. The foundation stone for the new building was laid by the proprietor of the Slaithwaite Spinning Company, William Varley, on 19 May 1892. It was designed by a local architect, James B. Eagland, in the neoclassical style, built in limestone brick and was completed later that year.

The design involved a symmetrical main frontage with five bays facing onto the Lewisham Road; the second bay from the left, which projected forward, was fenestrated by a segmental window on the ground floor and a sash window on the first floor and was surmounted by a Dutch gable with a projecting flagpole. The other bays were fenestrated by segmental windows on the ground floor, and by casement windows with window cills and alternating triangular and segmental pediments on the first floor. Internally, the principal room was the board room for the local board.

The local board was replaced by Slaithwaite Urban District Council, with its headquarters in the former public offices, in 1894. The building acted as the venue for parliamentary election results and it was there that the Reverend Charles Leach was duly elected member of parliament for Colne Valley at the January 1910 general election. Leach went on to serve as a hospital visitor during the First World War and his seat was declared vacant under the Lunacy (Vacating of Seats) Act in August 1916, when he became the only member of parliament ever to be disqualified under that Act.

A war memorial, in the form of a stone cross on a plinth, which was intended to commemorate the lives of local service personnel who died in the First World War, was erected to the immediate west of the town hall in the 1920s. An underground air raid shelter was established in the grounds during the Second World War.

The building continued to serve as the headquarters of Colne Valley Urban District Council after it was formed in 1937, but it ceased to be the local seat of government when the enlarged Kirklees Council was formed in 1974. The building went on to become the offices of a fashion exhibition organiser and then, after a change of ownership in October 2019 and a programme of refurbishment works costing £450,000, it re-opened as a business centre known as Empire House in July 2021.
