= When I Grow Too Old to Dream =

1935 song by Sigmund Romberg and Oscar Hammerstein II

Single by Glen Gray and the Casa Loma Orchestra, vocal Kenny Sargent
- B-side: The Night is Young
- Published: November 24, 1934 by Metro-Goldwyn-Mayer corp., New York
- Released: February 1935
- Recorded: January 9, 1935
- Studio: Decca Recording Studio, 799 Seventh Avenue, top floor, New York
- Genre: Pop standard, Popular Music
- Length: 3:15
- Label: Decca 349
- Composer: Sigmund Romberg
- Lyricist: Oscar Hammerstein II

"When I Grow Too Old to Dream" is a popular song with music by Sigmund Romberg and lyrics by Oscar Hammerstein II, published in 1934.

The song was introduced by Evelyn Laye and Ramon Novarro in the film The Night Is Young (1935). It has since become a pop standard, recorded by many artists, notably Nat King Cole, The Everly Brothers Gracie Fields, and John Pizzarelli

== Other versions ==
- Gracie Fields recorded the song in 1935.
- In 1949, Rose Murphy went to number 10 on the Most-Played Juke Box Race Records chart with her version.
- A 1951 recording by Gordon Jenkins was released as the flip side of his hit, "Charmaine" (Decca Records).
- Joni James included a version of the song on her 1957 album Among My Souvenirs.
- Ed Townsend released a version of the song as a single in 1958 that reached number 59 on the Billboard pop chart.
- Bing Crosby included the song in a medley on his album Join Bing and Sing Along (1959)
- Jazz organist Jimmy Smith released a version of the song on his 1963 album Back at the Chicken Shack
- Julie London recorded the song on her album Nice Girls Don't Stay for Breakfast released in 1967.
- Stéphane Grappelli and The Diz Dizley Trio recorded this on their 1975 album Violinspiration
- Linda Ronstadt recorded the song on her 1978 album Living in the USA, and performed the song on an episode of The Muppet Show.
- Slim Dusty recorded the song on his 1997 album A Time To Remember.
- John McDermott included the song in his concert special A Time To Remember, staging it as a father-daughter duet.
- A segment of "When I Grow Too Old to Dream" is used in the chorus of the song "Too Old To Dream" on O'Hooley & Tidow's album Silent June (2010).

== In popular culture ==
The song was featured in a 1935 MGM musical film called The Night Is Young, and is referred to in the 1970 film I Never Sang for My Father as the song the father had always asked his son to sing.

In the Australian soap opera A Place to Call Home, Elizabeth Bligh (Noni Hazlehurst) sings the song at Douglas' refuge in the episode called "Too Old to Dream". In the second season of the US television series Northern Exposure, the song is prominently featured in the second episode titled The Big Kiss.
