= Megan Henwood =

English singer-songwriter

Megan Henwood is an English singer-songwriter. She has played at concerts and festivals, and has released at least three albums, Making Waves (2011), Head Heart Hand (2015), and River (2017).

== Early life and education ==
Megan Henwood heard folk music from a young age, with her mother singing at the Nettlebed Folk Club in Oxfordshire, near her family home. Her first public performance was at the age of nine at the Henley Youth Festival. At the age of 18, she travelled around Europe, Thailand, India, Malaysia, and Nepal.

== Career ==
Henwood has performed at events such as the Cambridge Folk Festival, Fairport's Cropredy Convention, and Glastonbury Festival 2010.

She had returned to Nepal twice by 2010, to record and perform with some of the country's musicians.

Henwood's first album, Making Waves, was released on 4 July 2011 on Dharma Records, ahead of various festival appearances, including Larmer Tree, Cambridge Folk Festival, and Secret Garden Party. The album features musicians such as Peter Knight, Andy Crowdy, Joe Brown, Sam Brown, Mollie Marriott, Barriemore Barlow, and Nick Fyffe.

Her second album, Head Heart Hand, was released in July 2015. The album was produced by Tom Excell and featured Pete Thomas, Matthew Holborn, Matthew Forbes, Rich Milner, Jackie Oates, Tom Sibley, Sam Wilkinson, Tom Michell, and Steve Jones. Singles from the album were featured on various BBC Radio 2 shows, and Henwood performed a live session on The Folk Show with Mark Radcliffe. The video for "Love/Loathe", the first single from the album, was premiered on The Telegraph website in May 2015.

In 2026, she released Wings, an EP with Jackie Oates (Dharma Records DHARMACD25, 2016).

Henwood's third album, River, was released in the autumn of 2017. Working again with producer Tom Excell, she experimented with a more electronic sound, contrasting from her last two acoustic releases. The album was praised by Neil Spencer in The Guardian, who described it as 'a worldly, mature work'.

She has written with or for a number of artists, and has been commissioned as a songwriter for Arts Council England and Shakespeare Birthplace Trust.

== Other activities ==
Henwood has supported the London-based Child Action Nepal charity by donating profits from record sales.

She has contributed to music therapy sessions.

== Recognition ==
In 2009, Henwood – along with her saxophonist brother Joe – won the BBC Radio 2 Young Folk Award.

In 2010 Henwood was awarded a Sue Ryder Care "Woman of Achievement" award as Performer of the Year.

== Discography ==
=== Albums ===
- Making Waves (2011)
- Head Heart Hand (2015)
- River (2017)

=== EPs ===
- Wings (2016) – with Jackie Oates (Dharma Records DHARMACD25, 2016)
- Unplugged EP (2017)
- The Story Song Scientists EP (2019) – with Findlay Napier

=== Featured artist ===
- "Blind Eye" (Track 4) on the album First Strut Is The Deepest (2013) by Brother Strut
