= Music Is My Silence =

Music is My Silence

Studio album by Belinda O'Hooley
- Released: 13 June 2005 (UK)
- Recorded: January – March 2002 Woodman Studios, Elland, West Yorkshire
- Genre: Contemporary
- Length: 51:42
- Label: Rabble Rouser
- Producer: Adrian McNally

Belinda O'Hooley chronology
Music is My Silence (2005)	Inversions (2019)

Music is My Silence, the first album by Belinda O'Hooley, was released on 13 June 2005 on the Rabble Rouser label, distributed by Cadiz Music. Reviewer David Kidman of Netrhythms.com described it as "a commanding and defiant set of thoroughly contemporary-sounding songs".

== Track listing ==
All tracks are written by Belinda O'Hooley

No.	Title	Length
1.	"All that Remains"	5:16
2.	"Blanket of Night"	8:41
3.	"Moon Over Water"	4:45
4.	"Izuko, No More"	3:37
5.	"Lover"	3:55
6.	"Music is My Silence"	6:23
7.	"Different Light"	4:19
8.	"Afterglow"	3:59
9.	"Monalea"	6:41
10.	"With Her"	4:04

== Personnel ==
- Belinda O'Hooley – piano, vocals, backing vocals, voiceover on track 6, percussion
- Paul Denny – drums
- Chris Price – bass guitar
- Rachel Unthank – cello
- Janet Coyle – flute and accordion
- Steve Waterman – trumpet
- Kevin Holborough – trombone
- Adrian McNally – percussion, backing vocals
- Nicola Swords – voiceover on track 6

== Production ==
The album was recorded in 2003 by Jerry Barker at Woodman Studios, Elland, West Yorkshire.
