= Colne Valley Urban District =

History of the West Riding of Yorkshire, England

Coordinates: 53.854°N 1.767°W

Colne Valley
- Urban district
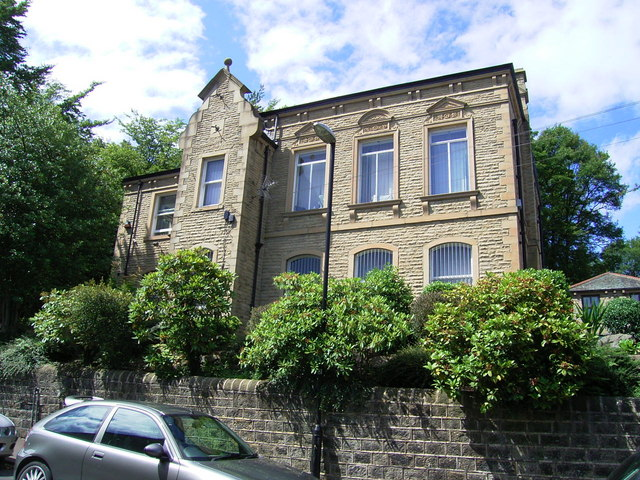
- Slaithwaite Town Hall
- Area
- 6,479 hectares (16,010 acres)
- Population
  - 1939: 22,766
  - 1961: 21,298
- History
  - Created: 1 April 1937
  - Abolished: 31 March 1974
  - Succeeded by: Metropolitan Borough of Kirklees
  - HQ: Slaithwaite
- Contained within
  - County Council: West Riding
- Map of boundary as of 1960

Colne Valley was an urban district in the West Riding of Yorkshire, England, between 1937 and 1974. It takes its name from the River Colne which rises above the town of Marsden and flows eastward towards Huddersfield.

Colne Valley Urban District was formed on 1 April 1937 following the abolition of many of the urban districts and reallocation of land surrounding Huddersfield and comprised the following former urban district areas:

- 584 hectares (1,440 acres) of Golcar Urban District — population 7,875
- 404 hectares (1,000 acres) of Linthwaite Urban District — population 5,220
- Marsden Urban District — 3,493 hectares (8,630 acres), population 5,723
- Scammonden Urban District — 731 hectares (1,810 acres), population 394
- Slaithwaite Urban District — 1,284 hectares (3,170 acres), population 5,183

Colne Valley UD was abolished under the Local Government Act 1972, becoming part of the Metropolitan Borough of Kirklees on 1 April 1974. No successor parish was created for the area, but its boundaries remain reflected in a ward of the same name on Kirklees Council.

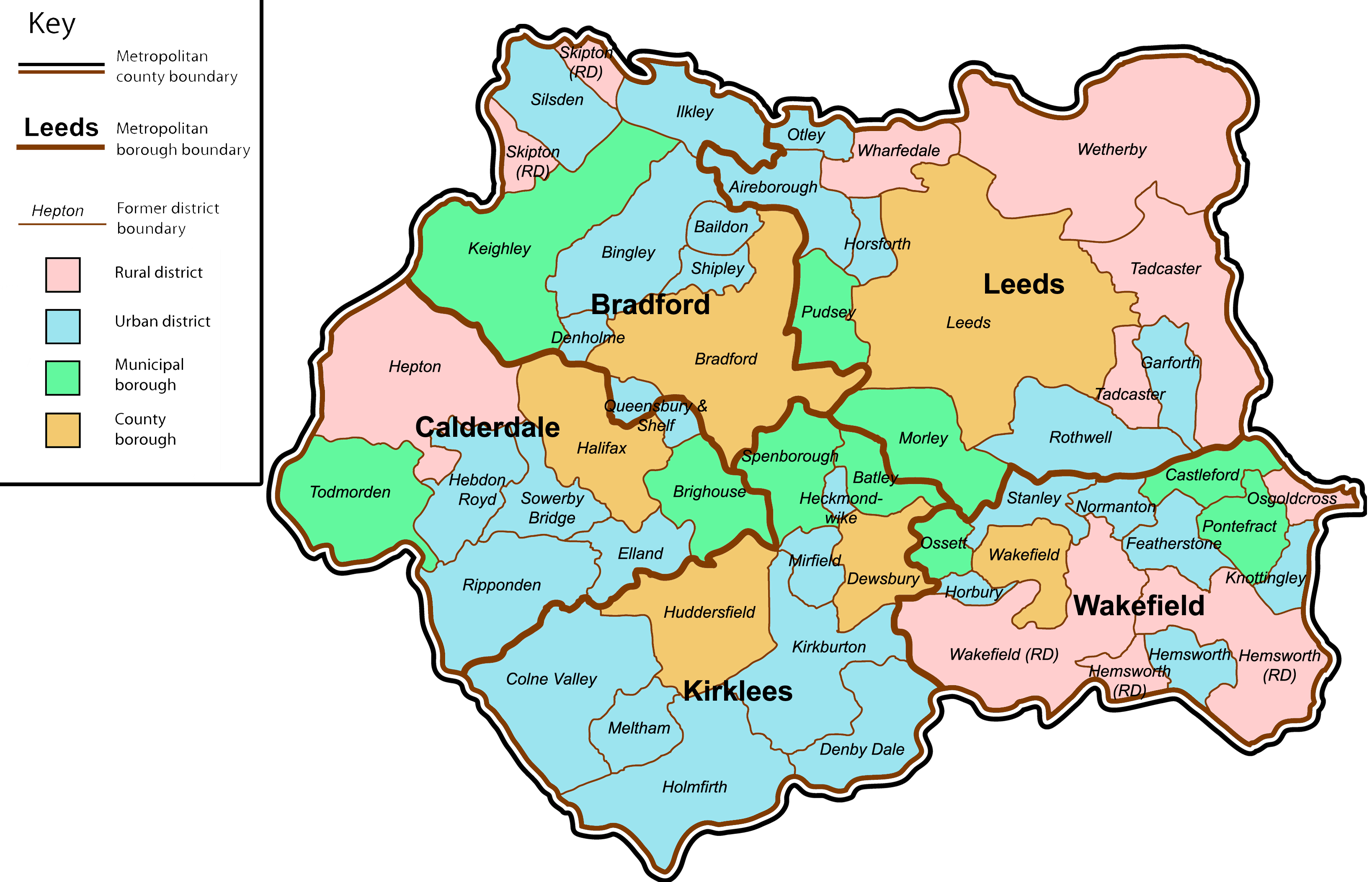
The surrounding pre-1974 districts which now make up West Yorkshire
