= Slaithwaite =

Town in West Yorkshire, England

Coordinates: 53.623°N 1.880°W

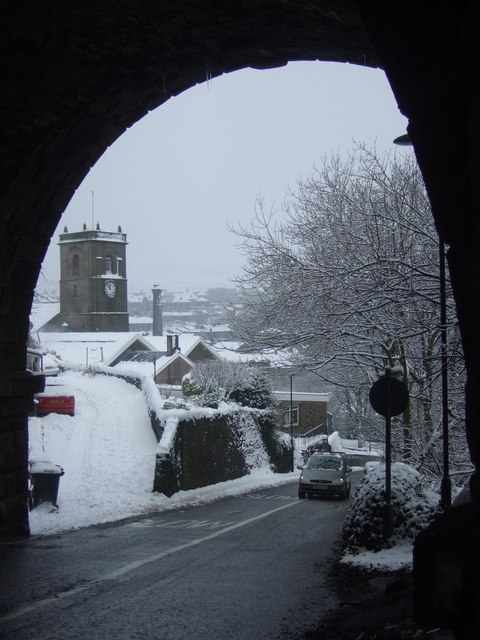
- St James's church through the viaduct

- Location within West Yorkshire
- OS grid reference: SE079141
  - London: 164 mi (264 km) SE
- Metropolitan borough: Kirklees
- Metropolitan county: West Yorkshire
- Region: Yorkshire and the Humber
- Country: England
- Sovereign state: United Kingdom
- Post town: HUDDERSFIELD
- Postcode district: HD7
- Dialling code: 01484
- Police: West Yorkshire
- Fire: West Yorkshire
- Ambulance: Yorkshire
- UK Parliament: Colne Valley

Slaithwaite (/ˈslaʊɪt/; Old Norse for "timber-fell thwaite/clearing") is a town in the Kirklees district of West Yorkshire, England. Historically part of the West Riding of Yorkshire, it is in the Colne Valley and on the Huddersfield Narrow Canal, 5 miles (8 km) south-west of Huddersfield.

== Pronunciation and alternative spelling ==
There are multiple news articles highlighting confusion about how this place name should be pronounced. One regional article states: "It's pronounced 'slath-wait' or 'sla-wit', but never Slaithwaite". Whilst a national article, referring to an update to pronunciation used on train announcements, uses the spelling "slou-wit" instead of sla-wit. Regionally, 'sla-wit' and 'slou-wit' are pronounced almost identically; this may be the leading cause for the discrepancy.

"Slawit" is also an alternative spelling used in names of businesses of the town.

== History ==
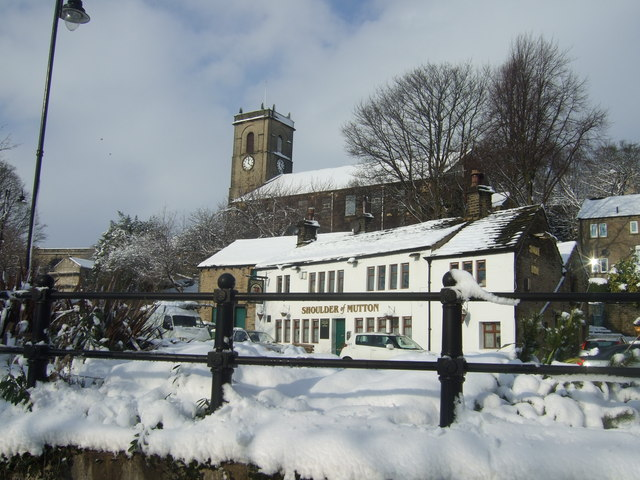
The parish church of St James and the Shoulder of Mutton inn

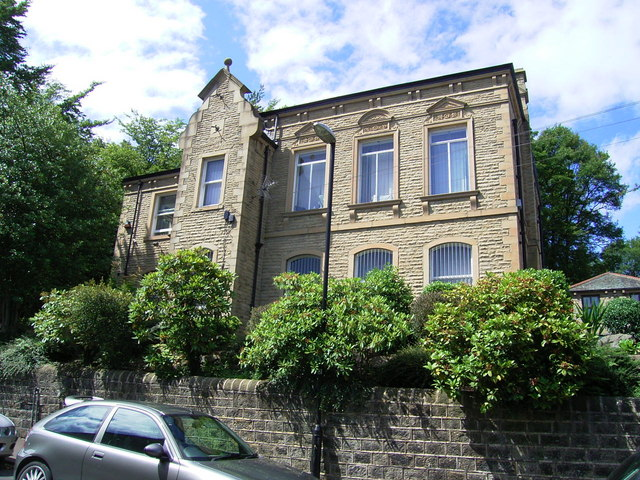
Slaithwaite Town Hall in Lewisham Road

Between 1195 and 1205, Roger de Laci, Constable of Chester, gave the manor of Slaithwaite to Henry Teutonicus (Lord Tyas). It remained in the Tyas family until the end of the 14th century when it came into the Kaye family. It eventually joined the estates of the Earl of Dartmouth, a descendant of the Kayes, and was part of the upper division of the wapentake of Agbrigg. It included the township of Lingarths (Lingards) and constituted the Chapelry of Slaithwaite, in the Patronage of the Vicar of Huddersfield.

In the early 19th century, a local spring was discovered to contain sulphurous properties and minerals, similar to those found in Harrogate. Sometime after 1820 a bathing facility was built, along with a gardens and pleasure ground, with some visitor cottages. A free school was founded in 1721 and rebuilt twice: first in 1744, and again in 1842.

In the 1848 edition of A Topographical Dictionary of England, Samuel Lewis (the editor) wrote: "the lands are in meadow and pasture, with a small portion of arable; the scenery is bold and romantic. In the quarries of the district are found vegetable fossils, especially firs and other mountain trees. The town is beautifully seated in the valley of the river Colne; the inhabitants are mostly employed in the woollen manufacture, in the spinning of cotton and silk, and in silk-weaving"

Slaithwaite Hall, (dated by dendrochronology to 1452), is located on a nearby hillside. It is one of a number of cruck-framed buildings clustered in this area of West Yorkshire. After many years divided into cottages, the building has been extensively restored and is now a single dwelling.

Legend has it that local smugglers caught by the excise men tried to explain their nocturnal activities as 'raking the moon from the canal' and definitely not as 'fishing out smuggled brandy'. A "Moonraker" is now the nickname for a native of the town. There are similar stories and nicknames for the neighbouring settlements of Golcar ("Lillies"), Marsden ("Cuckoos") and Linthwaite ("Leadboilers"). The legend is also known in Wiltshire, where the locals are also known as 'Moonrakers'.

Slaithwaite Town Hall in Lewisham Road served as the municipal headquarters of successive local authorities in the area until the abolition of Colne Valley Urban District Council in 1974.

=== Civil parish ===
Slaithwaite was formerly a township and chapelry. From 1866, Slaithwaite was a civil parish in its own right. On 1 April 1937, the parish was abolished to form Colne Valley. In 1931, the parish had a population of 5,183.

== Economy ==
Following the emergence of the railway network the canals located in Slaithwaite were seldom used and eventually closed down, then filled in during 1956.

Beginning in April 1981, and its grand reopening on 1 May 2001, restoration of the Huddersfield Narrow Canal was completed, with help from volunteers from the Huddersfield Canal Society. That required a full re-excavation and new lock gates.

There are several significant local employers, including the pharmaceutical manufacturer Thornton & Ross(which has its HQ based in Slaithwaite), Shaw Pallets, and Spectrum Yarns – one of a small number of remaining textiles businesses in the Colne Valley, once a major centre for wool and yarn.

== Churches ==
The church of St. James in Slaithwaite is the Anglican parish church; it is grouped with St Bartholomew's in Marsden and the mission church at Shred. The present church stands on high ground and was constructed c. 1789 to replace the original church which had suffered from flooding. There is also a Methodist church. and The Ark church.

== Commerce ==
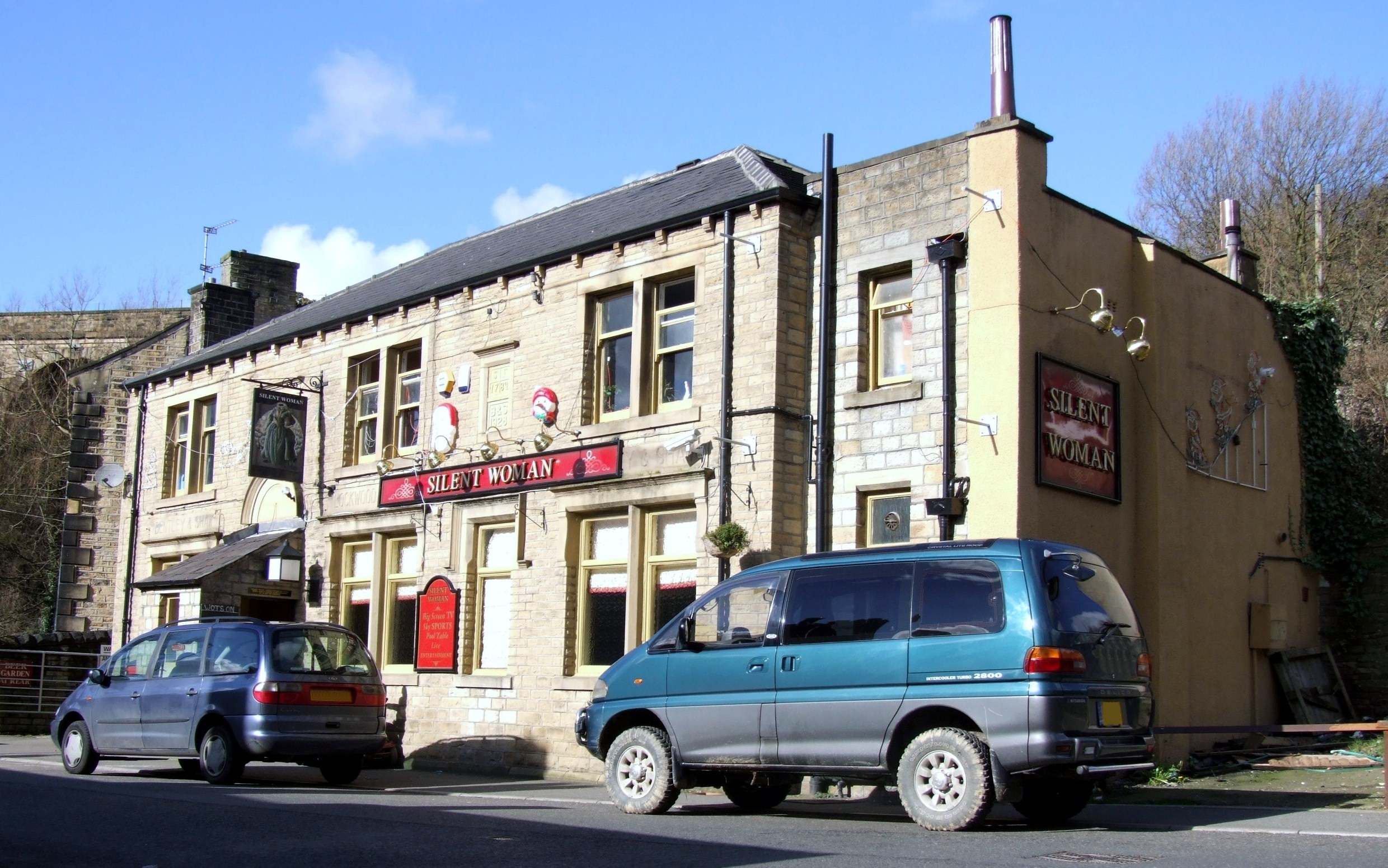
Silent Woman public house

There are many independent shops, a post office, cafes in the centre of Slaithwaite. Shops include the community-owned cooperative the 'Green Valley Grocer', the workers' cooperative the 'Handmade Bakery,' and the Mystical Moments 'magic wand shop'. In 2025, there was heritage lottery fund grant towards celebration of shops on Carr Lane.

There are several traditional public houses in Slaithwaite, including the 'Silent Woman' which came to the attention of the world media on 23 September 2007, when Christopher Hawkins walked into the pub and ordered a pint of beer a few minutes after he had murdered his son and attacked his daughter with a knife. The town is included as one of the stops in the Transpennine Real Ale Trail.

== Transport ==
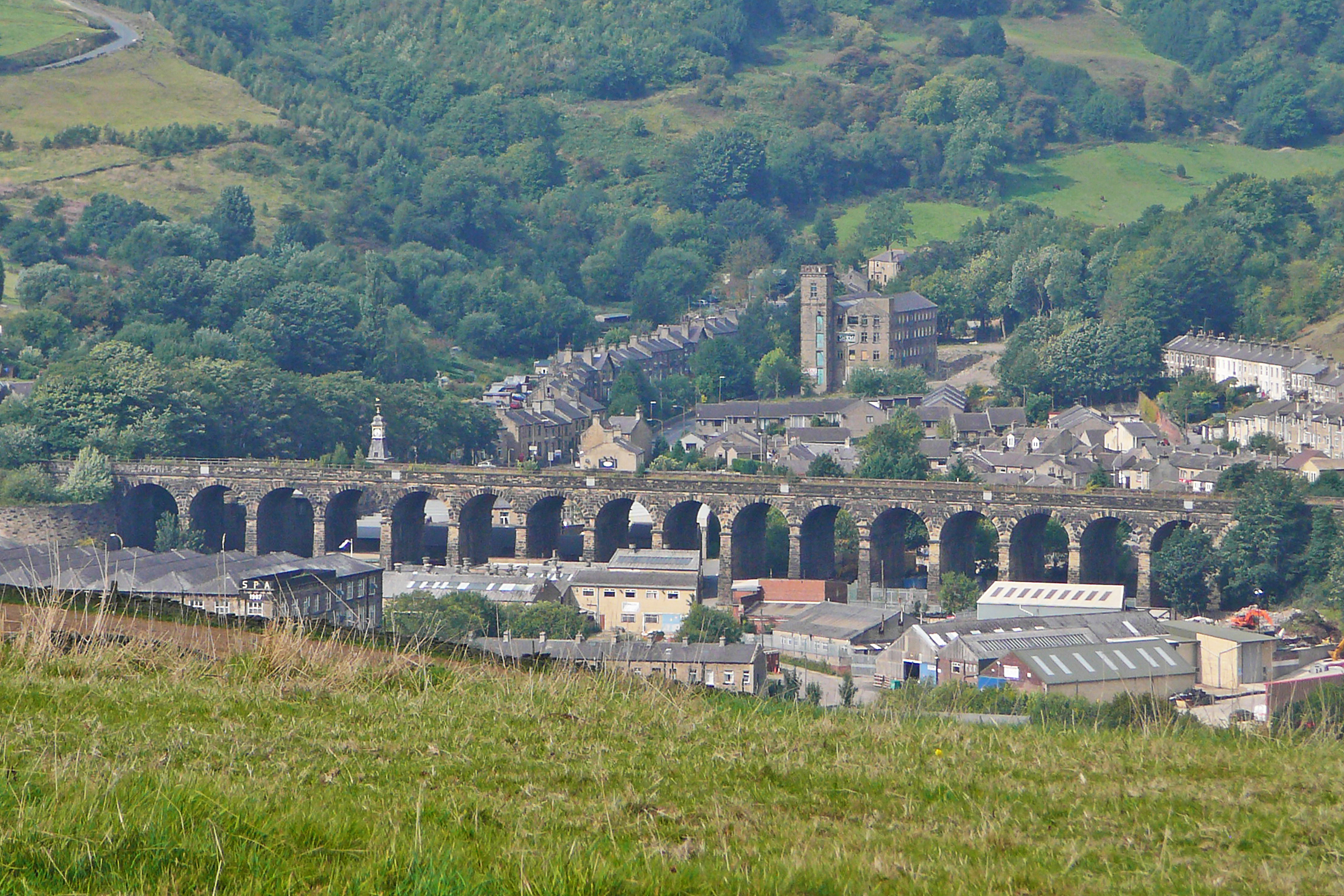
Slaithwaite Viaduct

There are direct trains to Huddersfield and Manchester from Slaithwaite railway station. The Colne Valley defines local geography by channelling the railway line, the canal, and the A62, each of which has at one time been the primary means of transport across the Pennines. The small humpback bridge over the canal is called 'Tim Brig'; it is said to be named after a local innkeeper who used the bridge during smuggling operations with the narrowboats passing through.

There are bus links from Slaithwaite to several places in the Huddersfield area. Services run by First West Yorkshire and First Manchester go from Slaithwaite to Marsden, Oldham and Manchester and to Huddersfield. Other bus services are to Holmfirth, Blackmoorfoot and surrounding villages.

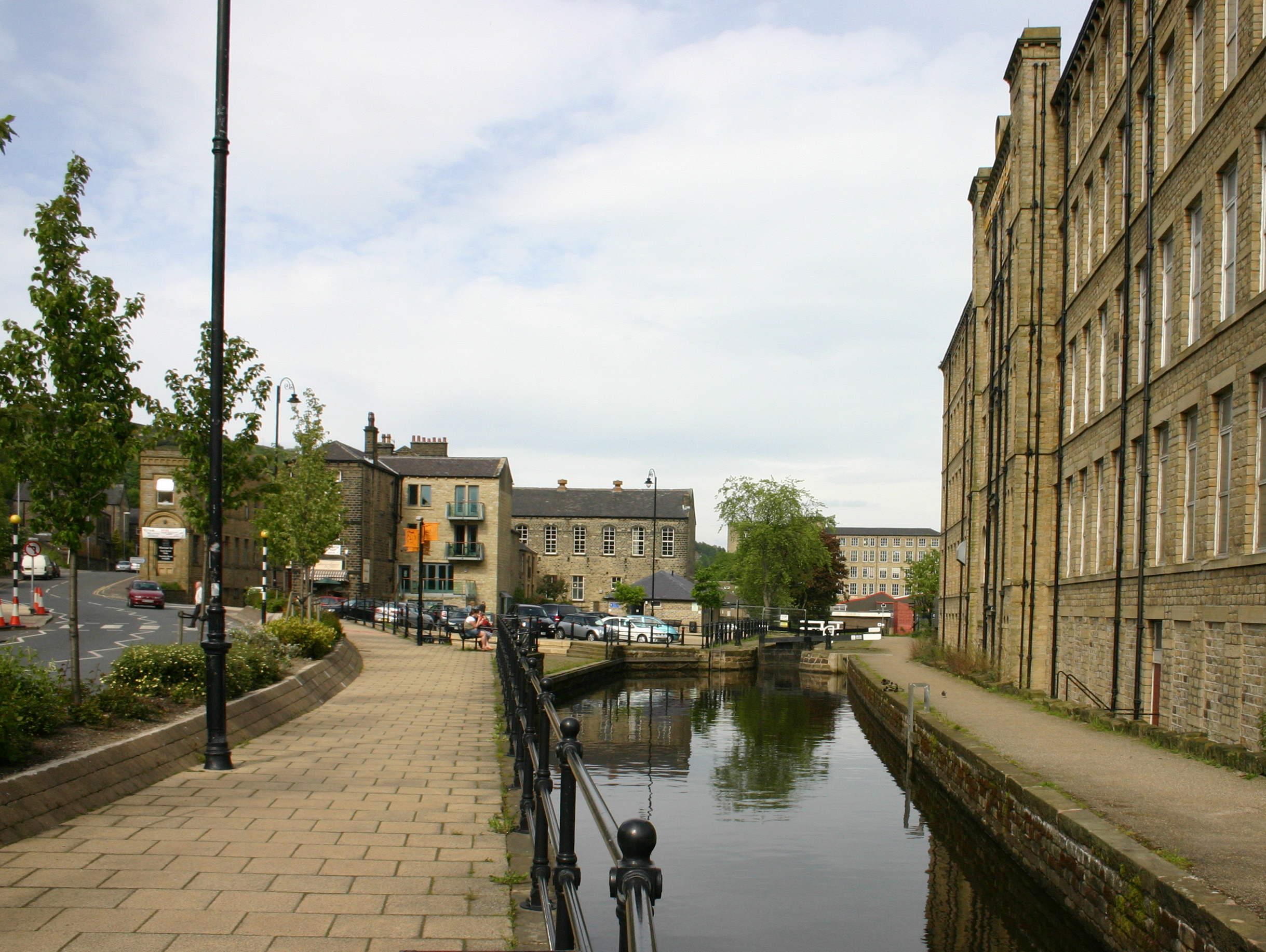
Huddersfield Narrow Canal Towpath at Slaithwaite

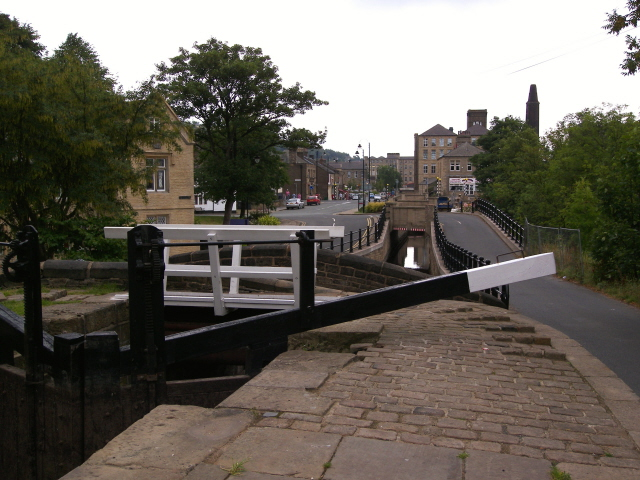
Canal lock in Slaithwaite

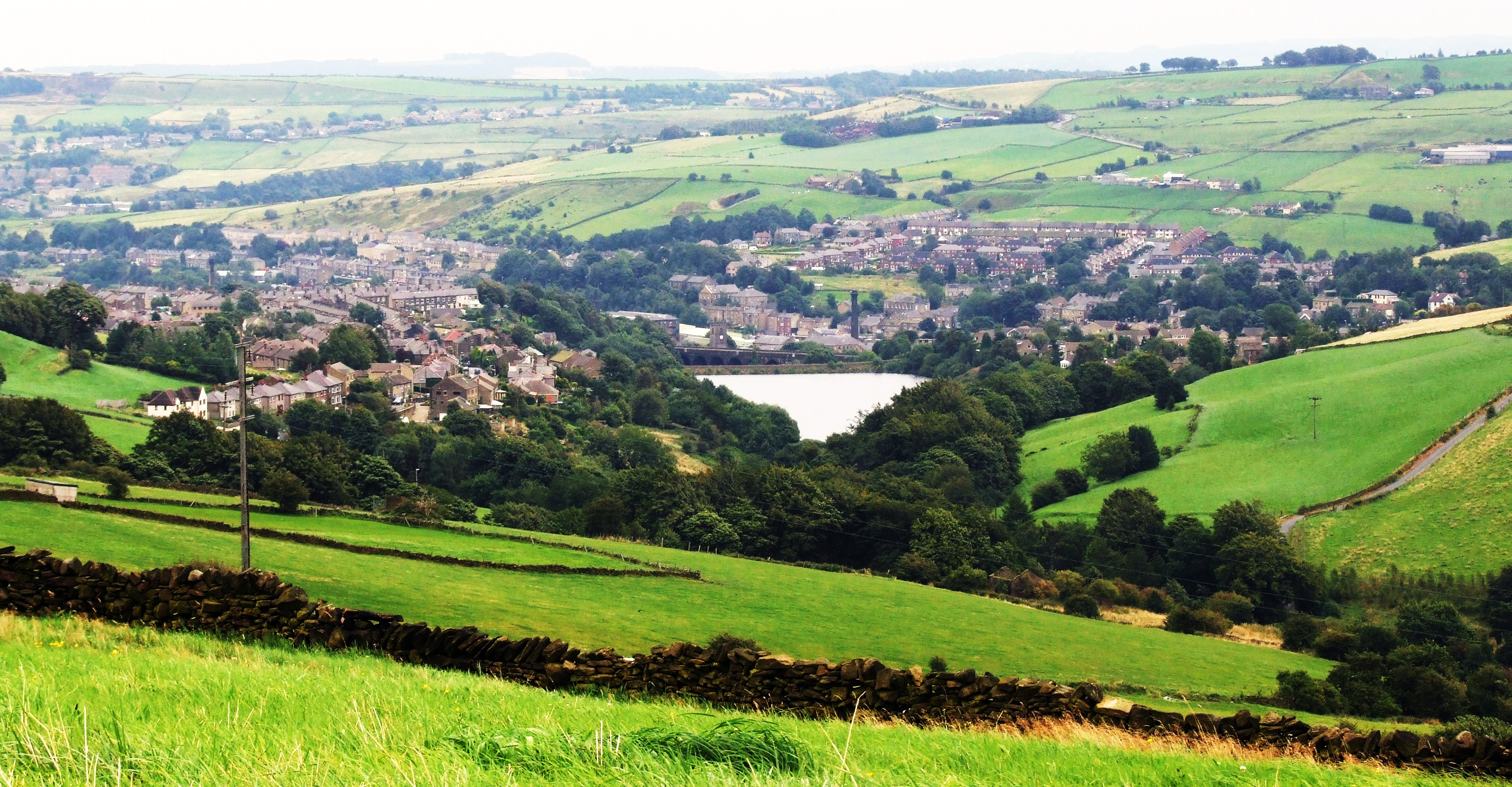
Slaithwaite, viewed from Laund Road

== Culture ==
In February, on alternate years, Slaithwaite celebrates a 19th-century legend of Moonraking with the Slaithwaite Moonraking Festival, with a week of lantern making and a programme of storytelling. The week-long celebration, which always takes place during the school half term week, ends with a parade of lanterns around the town, and a festival finale by the canal in the centre of the town. A heritage lottery funded project 'Wild about Wool', that is collating memories of the industrial heritage of the Colne Valley, is linked to the festival. 'Wool' was also the theme of the festival held in February 2011.

Slaithwaite is also home to the annual &Piano Music Festival, a classical chamber music festival started in 2018, that focuses on showcasing professional musicians with a connection to the North of England.

The Slaithwaite Civic Hall is building dating to 1884 and is managed by the community-owned, not-for-profit Civic Hall Trust. The Civic Hall is used for concerts, music, theatre, dance, fitness, weddings, public meetings and hosts the local food bank. The venue is home to the Slaithwaite Philharmonic Orchestra.

The Slaithwaite Philharmonic Orchestra was founded here in 1891. An 80-strong amateur orchestra, the orchestra also plays an annual season of concerts in Huddersfield.

Slaithwaite Brass Band have been making music here since 1892. They perform at many concerts and events throughout the year and have had many successes over the years including being the first band to gain the Grand Shield twice.

Colne Valley Male Voice Choir was established in Slaithwaite in 1922. The choir often performs alongside brass bands, such as the Brighouse and Rastrick Brass Band. The choir now rehearses at the Methodist church in the adjacent town of Linthwaite, but maintains a connection to Slaithwaite through organising events such as its workshop for new singers, called "Let all men sing", held at the Slaithwaite Civic Hall and St James Church. In 2010, the choir launched the Colne Valley Boys choir.

== Media ==
Local news and television programmes is provided by BBC Yorkshire and ITV Yorkshire. Television signals are received from the Emley Moor TV transmitter and the local relay transmitter situated west of the town.

Local radio stations are BBC Radio Leeds on 92.4 FM, Heart Yorkshire on 106.2 FM, Capital Yorkshire on 105.1 FM, Hits Radio West Yorkshire on 102.5 FM and Greatest Hits Radio West Yorkshire on 96.3 FM.

The town is served by the local newspaper, Huddersfield Daily Examiner.

== Sport ==
Cricket is popular in the town. Slaithwaite Cricket & Bowling Club, situated on Hill Top, during the summer becomes the heart of the community. It is a thriving club with many successful teams including winning Second XI Premiership Championship in the 2010 season. The town also has its own running club named Slaithwaite Striders, which has a mixture of all abilities, meeting weekly to run and enjoy the surrounding roads, paths and of course the views.

== Notable people born in Slaithwaite ==
- William Crowther, Mayor of Auckland, born at Slaithwaite-cum-Lingards, 1832.
- Haydn Wood, (composer) was born here on 25 March 1882.

== See also ==
- Listed buildings in Colne Valley (central area)
