= Belinda O'Hooley =

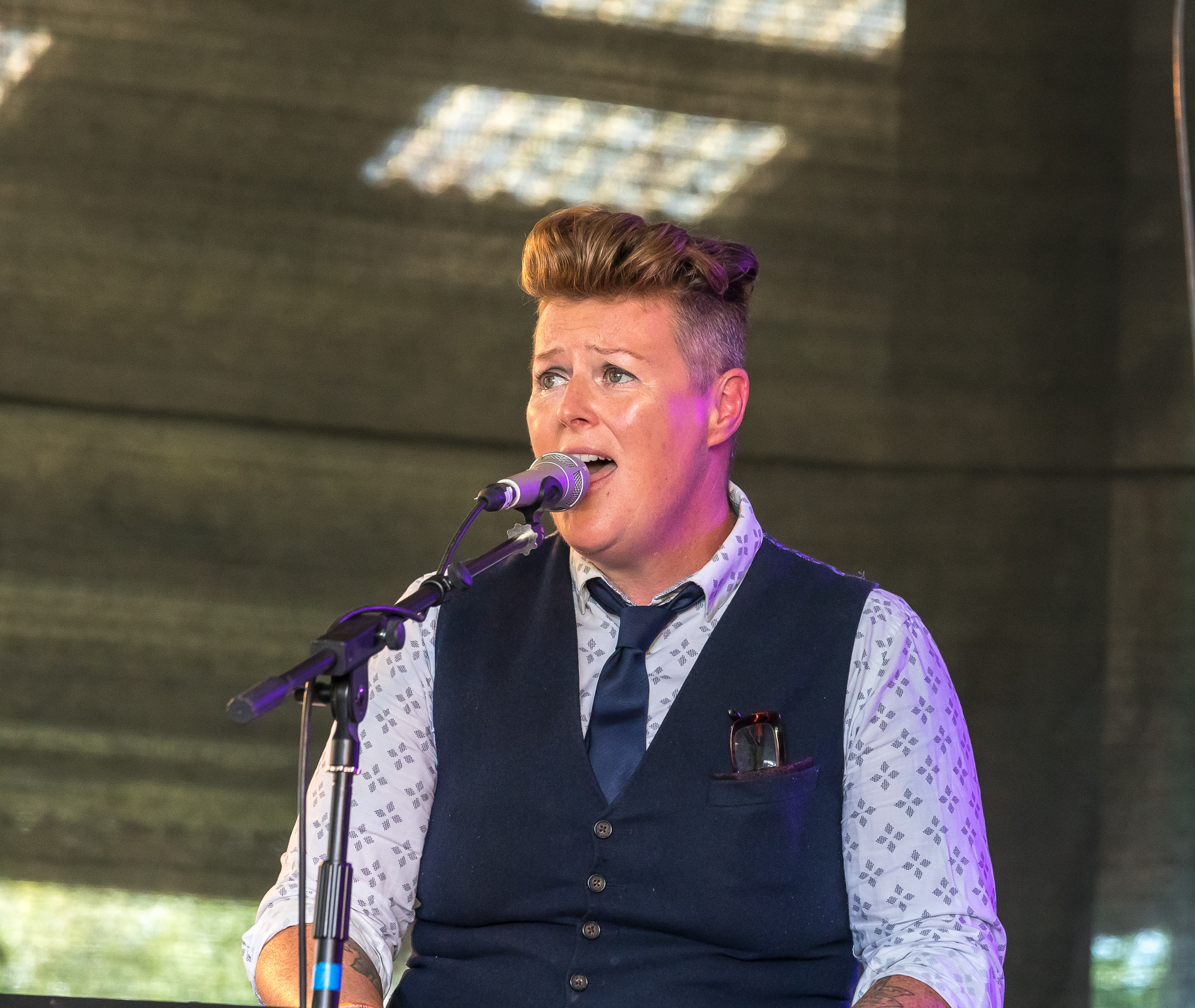
- O'Hooley at the Purbeck Valley Folk Festival 2024

Background information
- Born: Leeds, England
- Genres: Folk, chamber folk, singer-songwriter
- Instruments: piano, accordion, vocal
- Years active: 2004–present
- Labels: No Masters; Rabble Rouser; Hum Records; Needle Pin Records
- Spouse: Heidi Tidow (m. 2016)
- Website: www.ohooleyandtidow.com

Belinda O'Hooley (born 18 July 1971) is a singer-songwriter and pianist from Yorkshire, England. Formerly a member of Rachel Unthank and the Winterset (now The Unthanks), she now records and performs solo as well as in a duo with Jackie Oates and also as O'Hooley & Tidow with her wife Heidi Tidow (pronounced Tee-doe).

== Early life and education ==
O'Hooley, who has Irish roots, was born in Horsforth, Leeds, grew up in Guiseley and went to school in Menston. She studied behavioural sciences at the University of Huddersfield.

== Professional career ==
O'Hooley comes from a long line of County Sligo musicians and performed alongside her first cousin Tommy Fleming, a singer who was formerly with De Dannan.

=== Rachel Unthank and the Winterset ===
From 2004 until 2008 she was a member of Rachel Unthank and the Winterset (now The Unthanks). Nic Oliver, reviewing their 2007 album The Bairns for musicOMH, described O'Hooley as "the ace in the pack throughout The Bairns. Her background in cabaret (intriguingly, she had once appeared on Stars In Their Eyes impersonating Annie Lennox) adds a left-field edge to the music, with her jazzy piano chords lending a sing-along feel to the live favourite Blue's Gaen Oot O'The Fashion. O'Hooley also contributes the two original tracks to the album, although the casual listener could quite easily mistake both Blackbird and Whitehorn (Note: The song is actually called "Whitethorn", as O'Hooley explains in an interview with David Peschek: "It's about my great-grandmother, struggling to survive in a tiny village in Ireland...She was pregnant 15 or 16 times and only two babies survived. Because they hadn't lived long enough to be christened, they weren't buried in the local churchyard, but under a whitethorn bush, actually near where my dad lives now. It really brought home to me the history of women's struggles, and made me want to write." David Peschek (14 September 2007). "In our family, singing is the law". The Guardian. Archived from the original on 5 October 2014.) for traditional songs".

=== Solo albums ===
In 2005 O'Hooley released a solo album, Music is My Silence, described by reviewer David Kidman of Netrhythms.co.uk as "a commanding and defiant set of thoroughly contemporary-sounding songs" and by FATEA as "a highly polished collection of songs that gently sway between folk and jazz". In 2019 she released a second solo album, Inversions, described by Jude Rogers in The Guardian as "a set of beautiful piano and spoken-word pieces".

=== O'Hooley & Tidow ===
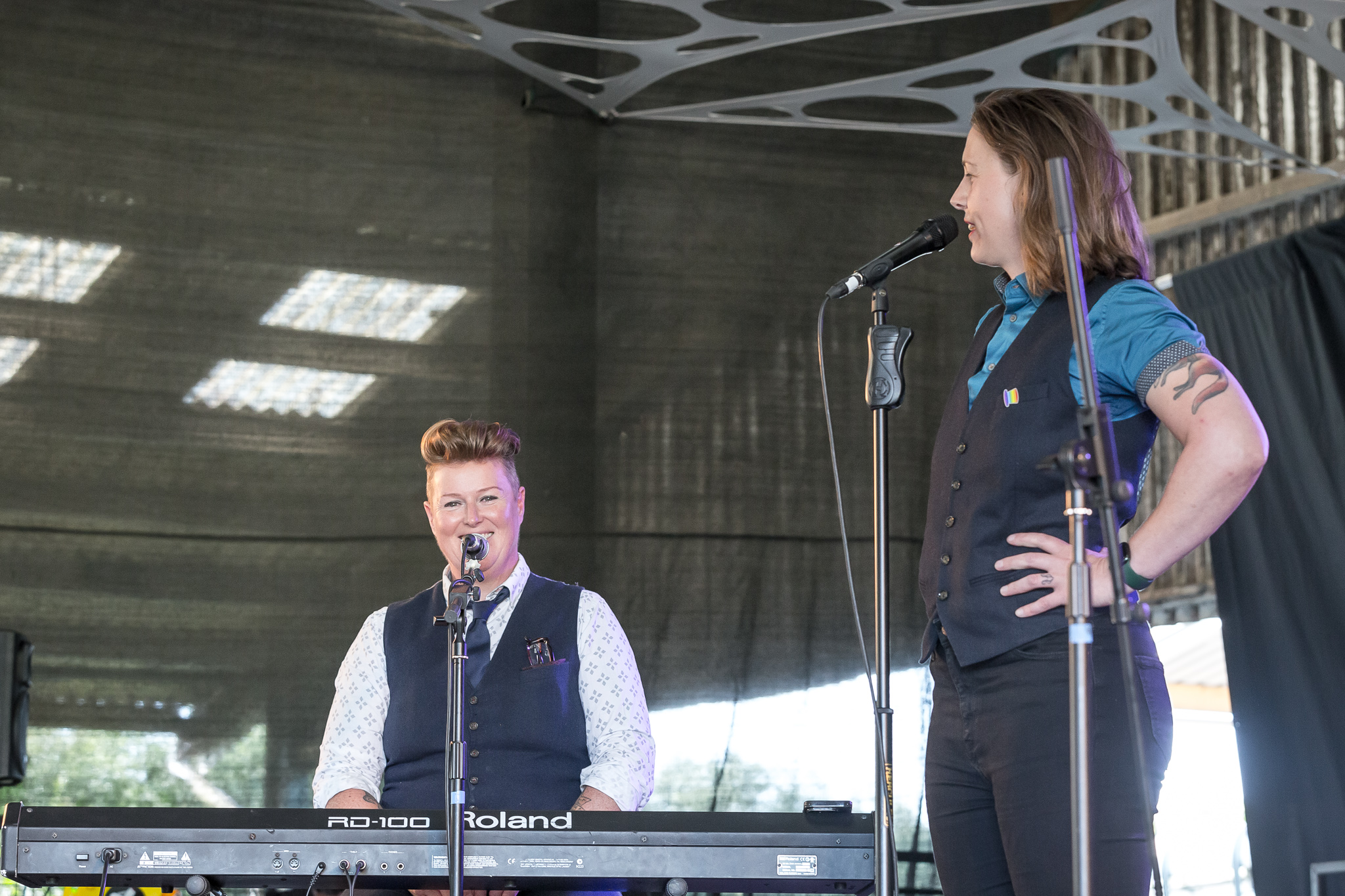
O'Hooley & Tidow at the Purbeck Valley Folk Festival in 2024

She has issued eight albums with Heidi Tidow, performing as O'Hooley & Tidow. Their 2016 album, Shadows, was given a five-starred review by Robin Denselow in The Guardian and four of their other albums have received four-starred reviews in the British national press.

=== Coven ===
With Heidi Tidow she performs in the all-female group Coven, whose members also include Hannah James, Rowan Rheingans, Hazel Askew and Grace Petrie. In 2017, Coven released an EP, Unholy Choir.

=== Collaborations with Jackie Oates ===
O'Hooley played piano on Jackie Oates' albums Jackie Oates (2006), The Violet Hour (2008), Hyperboreans (2009), Saturnine (2011) and Lullabies (2013). In 2026 she and Oates released a joint album, As the Light Draws In.

=== Other musical contributions ===
With Heidi Tidow, she was also featured on Chumbawamba's album ABCDEFG (2010) and DVD Going, Going – Live at Leeds City Varieties (2012), Lucy Ward's debut album Adelphi Has to Fly (2011) and Patsy Matheson's Domino Girls (2014). O'Hooley & Tidow were amongst the musicians on the album The Ballads of Child Migration: Songs for Britain's Child Migrants, released by Delphonic Records in October 2015. They contributed the music for one song on the album, "Why Did I Leave Thee?"

O'Hooley also accompanied Nic Jones at London's Queen Elizabeth Hall on his 2011 comeback tour and on further tours in 2012 and 2013. In 2015 O'Hooley accompanied Jim Boyes on his Sensations of a Wound tour, telling a little-known story of the First World War. An album of this music, Sensations of a Wound: The Long, Long Trail of Robert Riby Boyes, was released on the No Masters label in February 2015.

She appeared on Ray Hearne's album Umpteen in 2016.

== Other ==
She had a small acting role as a plain-clothes police inspector in episode 1 of season 3 of Happy Valley, the TV programme created by Sally Wainwright who also created the TV series Gentleman Jack. O'Hooley's name is one of those featured on the sculpture Ribbons, unveiled in 2024.

== Discography ==
=== with Rachel Unthank and the Winterset ===
Title	Format	Release date	Label	Notes
Cruel Sister	album	11 May 2005	Rabble Rouser (RR005) (UK); Cortex (CTX392CD) (Australia)	
The Bairns	album	28 August 2007	EMI (50999 504 3802 0) / Rabble Rouser (50999 504 3802 0) (UK); Shock Records/ Rabble Rouser (Australia); Real World Music (USCDRW158)/ Rykodisc (USA)	Includes two original songs by O'Hooley: "Blackbird" and "Whitethorn"

=== Solo albums ===
Title	Format	Release date	Label
Music is My Silence	album	13 June 2005	Rabble Rouser (RR001), distributed by Cadiz Music
Inversions	album	28 June 2019	No Masters (NMCD53), distributed by Proper Records

=== O'Hooley and Tidow ===
Belinda O'Hooley's recordings with Heidi Tidow are listed at O'Hooley & Tidow.

=== with Coven ===
Title	Format	Release date	Label
Unholy Choir	EP	19 March 2017	own label COVENCD01

=== with Jackie Oates ===
Title	Format	Release date	Label
As the Light Draws In (2026)	album	16 October 2026	Needle Pin Records

== Personal life ==
Belinda O'Hooley and her wife Heidi Tidow, who married in 2016, live in Marsden, West Yorkshire. They have a son, Flynn, born in September 2019.
