= Uiscedwr =

British musical group

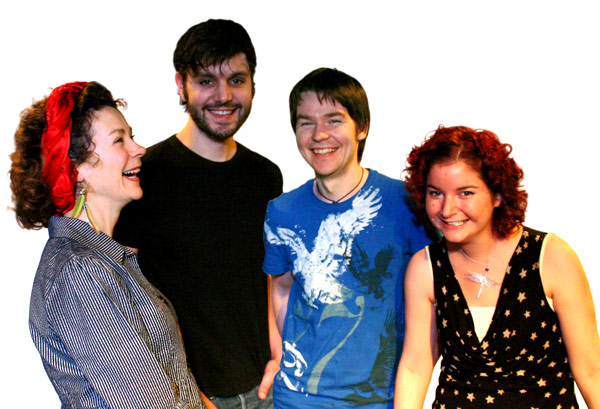
- Uiscedwr in 2008

Background information
- Origin: County Waterford \ Mid-Wales \ Manchester
- Genres: Folk music, Contemporary Folk
- Years active: 2002–2011
- Labels: Yukka Records
- Members: Anna Esslemont, Cormac Byrne, Nick Waldock / James Hickman
- Past members: Ben Hellings, Kevin Dempsey
- Website: http://www.uiscedwr.com

Uiscedwr (pronounced "ish-ka-dooer") is a former musical group whose members came from various parts of the British Isles and played British folk music influenced by world music. The group started off as a trio and was originally based in Manchester.

Uiscedwr won the BBC Radio 2 Young Folk Award in 2002.

As well as touring and recording, Uiscedwr ran its own label Yukka Records and the members also offered tuition in fiddle, guitar and bodhrán.

== History ==
Esslemont and Byrne met in Manchester in 2002, and soon afterwards formed the group. Byrne invited a friend from Ireland to play the guitar, and with the line-up fleshed out by Esslemont's younger sister they entered the BBC Young Folk Awards 2002, which they won. Despite the win, the guitarist left the group, and Esslemont called upon an old acquaintance, Ben Hellings.

As the trio of Esslemont, Byrne and Hellings, the group recorded Everywhere in 2003, which gained them a nomination for the Horizon Award at the BBC Radio 2 Folk Awards in 2005. By this time, Uiscedwr was mixing British folk music with a strong Celtic bias with other influences including jazz, European folk music and world music.

Shortly before the 2005 BBC Radio 2 Folk Awards, Hellings left the group and was replaced by guitarist Kevin Dempsey who also contributed vocals.

During 2005, Anna Esslemont was diagnosed with aplastic anaemia. Her illness meant the group had to reduce its touring commitments and delay work on the second album. Esslemont had a successful bone marrow transplant in December 2006 and Uiscedwr resumed touring in June 2007. Subsequently, Uiscedwr (and Esslemont in particular) has been active in fundraising for the Aplastic Anaemia Trust charity.

Dempsey left Uiscedwr in December 2007 to concentrate on other projects and was replaced by Shropshire guitarist James Hickman in January 2008. At the beginning of 2008, Uiscedwr joined the roster of folk-and-acoustic music agency Iconic Music. Accordionist Karen Tweed guested with Uiscedwr during 2008 and early 2009.

The band's third album, Fish Cat Door, was released in May 2009. The title of the 11-track CD is a tongue-in-cheek aide-mémoire to the pronunciation of the band's name.

In early 2010, Nick Waldock joined the trio alternating as guitarist with James Hickman.

Uiscedwr broke up after its final tour in late 2011.

== Members ==
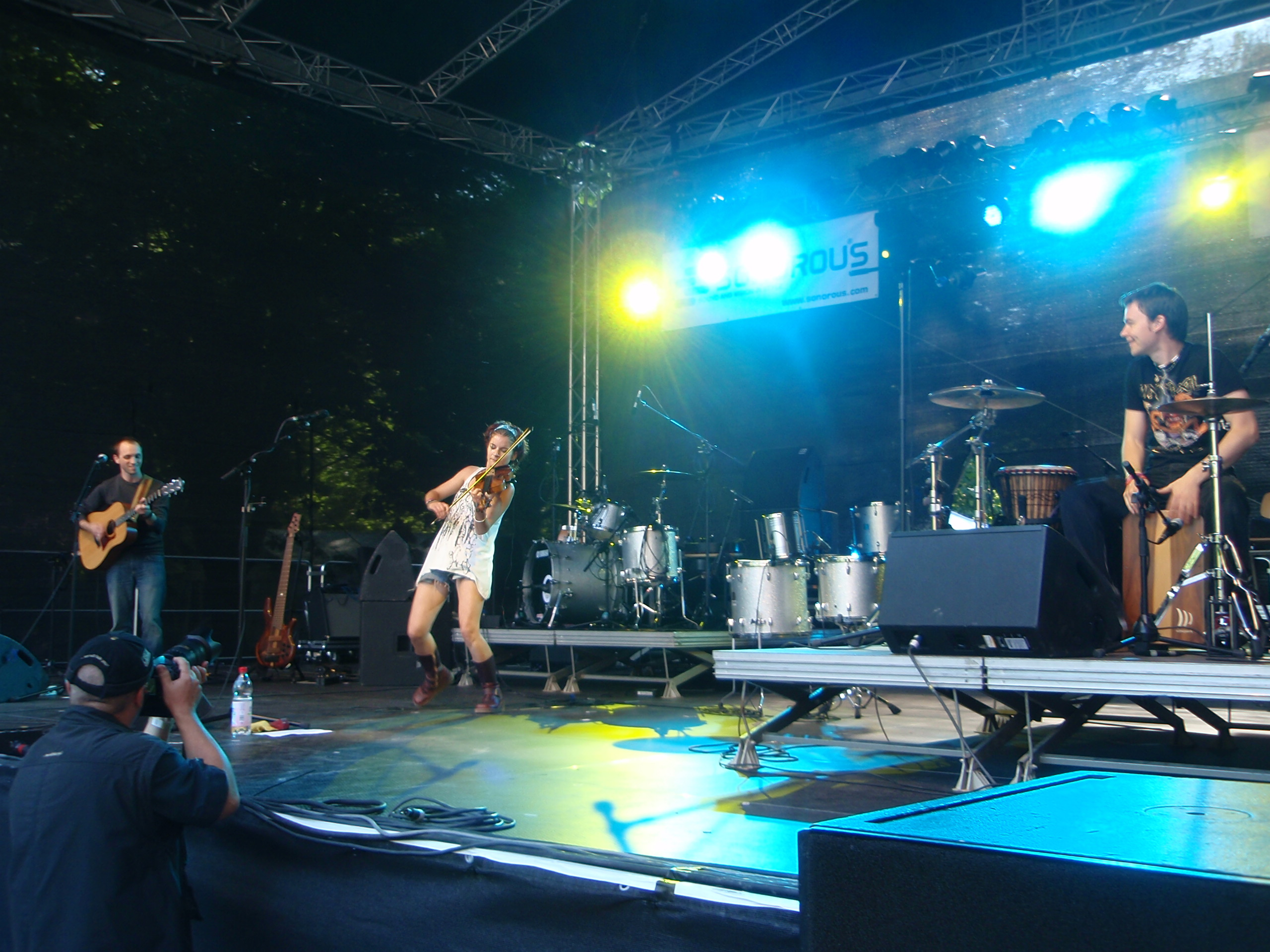
Uiscedwr performing as a trio at the 2011 Folk im Schlosshof festival

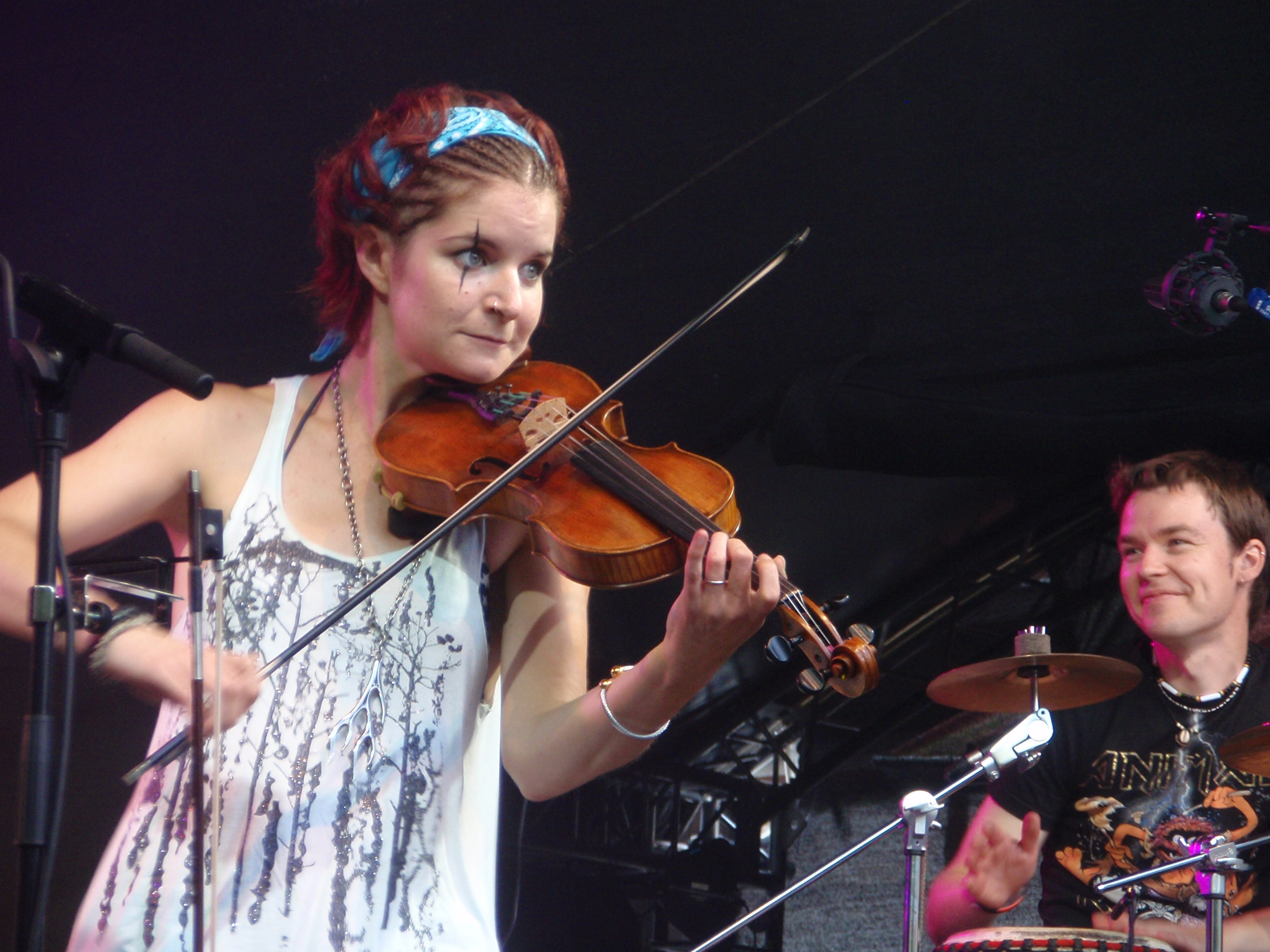
Anna Esslemont and Cormac Byrne at the 2011 Folk im Schlosshof festival

Co-founder Anna Esslemont, from Wales, plays fiddle and sings. She dropped out of the Royal Northern College of Music to pursue a freer musical style than was offered by the classical world. She grew up in Wales, and has played the violin since she was six, playing in both the North Powys Youth Orchestra and the National Youth Orchestra of Wales.

Co-founder Cormac Byrne, from County Waterford, Ireland, plays bodhrán, percussion and drums. He has been a member of Tommy Hayes' percussion orchestra Spraoi Drummers. As well as touring and recording with Uiscedwr, Byrne has toured extensively with Seth Lakeman's band and gained a BBC Fame Academy Bursary, which was used to partially fund Uiscedwr's second album, Circle.

Anna and Cormac perform as a trio with a supporting guitarist. From January 2010, guitar is played by either Nick Waldock or James Hickman (and Nick also plays bass guitar). Nick first worked with Uiscedwr during its 'big band' project in 2008; James joined Uiscedwr at the end of 2007 to replace Kevin Dempsey.

== Uiscedwr Big Band ==
During 2008, Uiscedwr experimented with a 'big band' project as an offshoot of its trio line-up. The six-piece band debuted at Glasgow's Celtic Connections festival. Like its parent trio, Uiscedwr Big Band played Celtic-influenced folk with elements of jazz, klezmer, gypsy, Latin, and American folk fiddle.

Uiscedwr Big Band released a live album titled Naked and Dangerous and played a showcase concert at the annual Association of Festival Organisers Conference.

== Discography ==
- Everywhere (released 7 June 2004)

"Feathers"
"A-part before the Swing"
"Mr and Mrs"
"The Drunken Mouse"
"Waterman's"
"No Going Back"
"Everywhere"
"Set in the Woods"
"All About Flying"
"Mind the Gap"
"La Peri"

- Circle (released 24 July 2006)

"Everyday Cynic"
"Esta Levista"
"America"
"Escobar"
"Ceol Aine"
"The Beast"
"The Music Bringer"
"Not The Hurricane"
"Tut-Tut"
"Yorkshire Tea"
"Tree"
"Flea Circus"

- Naked and Dangerous (Uiscedwr Big Band, limited release 23 November 2008)

"Esta Levista"
"Forever my Beloved"
"Naked & Dangerous Part I"
"Naked & Dangerous Part II"
"Waterwater"
"Storm"
"Deise"
"Yorkshire Tea"

- Fish Cat Door (released May 2009)

"The Dirty Nine Steps"
"Prescription Junkie"
"Sunshine"
"Seven Letters"
"Tip Tap Baby"
"Germs"
"Girlyjig"
"End of the Day"
"Crucked Reels"
"ESP"
"Neptune"
