= Jackie Oates =

English folk singer (born 1983)

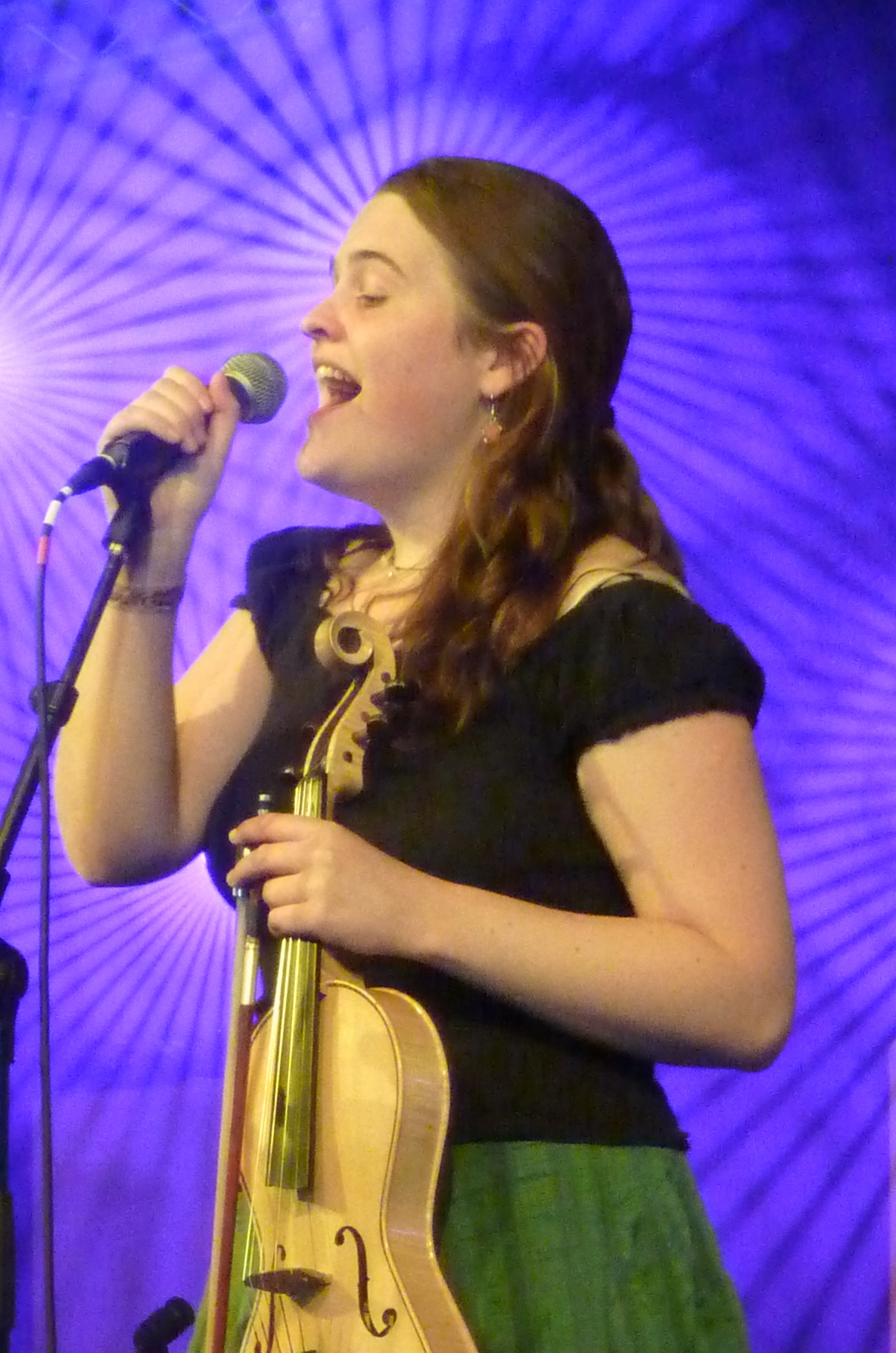
- Oates in 2010

Background information
- Born: 1983 (age 42–43); Congleton, Cheshire, England
- Origin: Brocton, Staffordshire
- Genre: Folk
- Occupations: Musician; music teacher
- Instruments: Singing; violin; viola; shruti box
- Years active: 2003–present
- Website: jackieoates.co.uk

Jackie Oates is an English folk singer and fiddle player.

== Life ==
Jackie Oates was born in Congleton in Cheshire in 1983. At the age of 18, she moved to Devon to study English literature at Exeter University and was based in Devon until 2011, when she moved to Oxfordshire where she lives with her young family. She was a member of Rachel Unthank and the Winterset between 2003 and 2007.

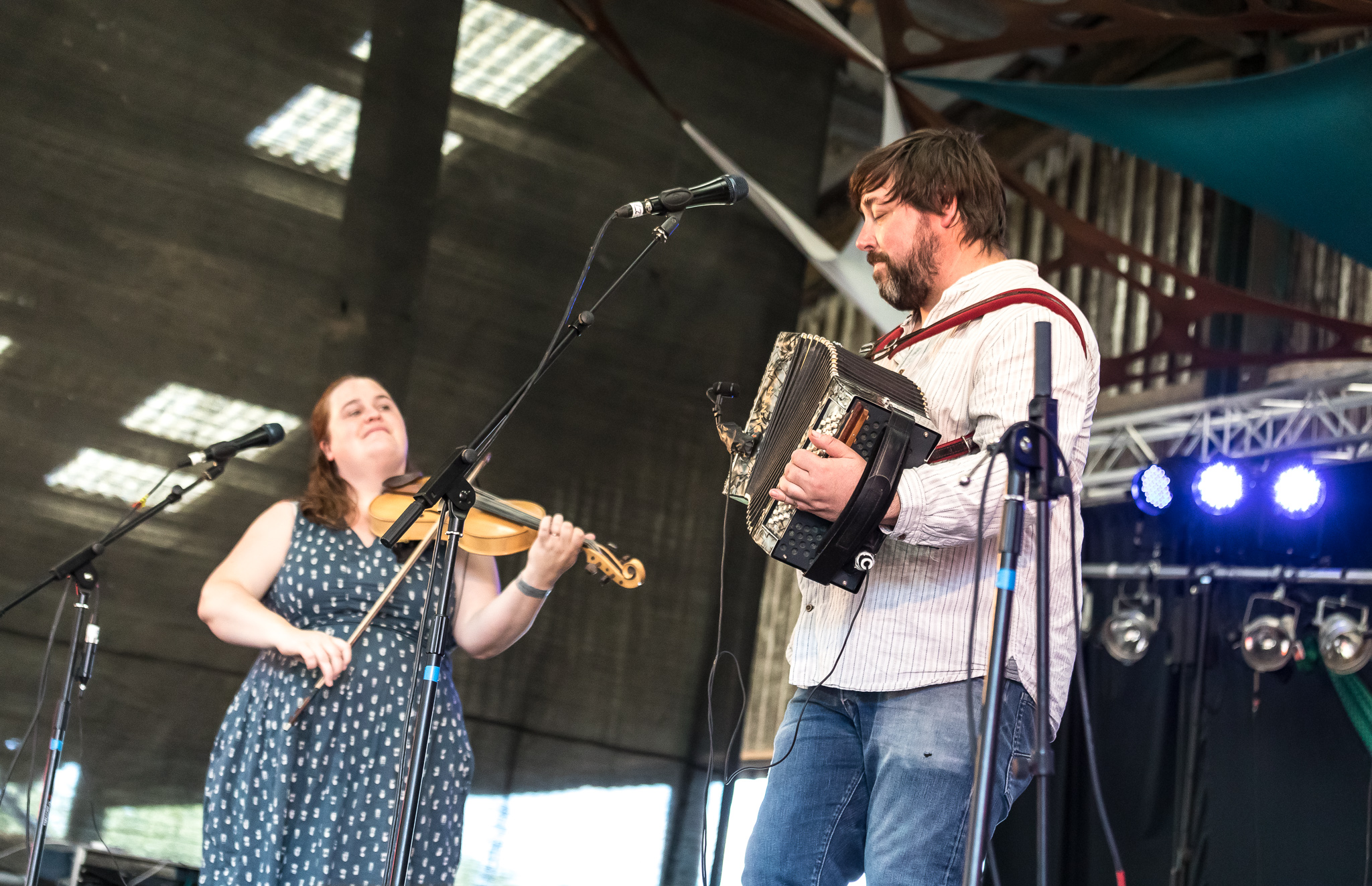
Performing with John Spiers at Purbeck Valley Folk Festival in 2021

She was a finalist in the BBC Radio 2 Young Folk Award in 2003, and was one of the nominees for the BBC Radio 2 Folk Awards "Horizon Award" in 2008, going on to win that award in 2009, as well as the award for best traditional track for her recording of "The Lark in the Morning".

She has performed as part of the folk trio Wistman's Wood and sung with Morris Offspring and The Imagined Village. She has also performed with John Spiers of Bellowhead, with whom she recorded the album, Needle Pin, Needle Pin in 2020. In 2026 she toured with Belinda O'Hooley and they recorded an album together, As the Light Draws In.

Her brother is English singer, multi-instrumentalist and record producer Douglas Oates – better known as Jim Moray – and they have guested on each other's albums.

== Discography ==
Solo albums

- Jackie Oates (Hands On Music HMCD25, 2006)
- The Violet Hour (Chudleigh Roots CR002, 2008)
- Hyperboreans (One Little Indian TPLP1034CD, 2009)
- Saturnine (ECC Records ECC004, 2011)
- Lullabies (ECC Records ECC009, 2013)
- The Spyglass & The Herringbone (ECC Records ECC015, 2015)
- The Joy of Living (ECC Records ECC018, 2018)
- Gracious Wings (Needle Pin Records NP2, 2022)

Albums as Jackie Oates Trio

- (with Mike Cosgrave and John Parker) Christmas Album (Needle Pin Records, 2023)

Albums with other acts

- Cruel Sister – Rachel Unthank and the Winterset (Rabble Rouser RR005, 2005)
- Bending The Dark – The Imagined Village (ECC Records ECC006, 2012)
- Wings (EP) – with Megan Henwood (Dharma Records DHARMACD25, 2016)
- Needle Pin, Needle Pin – with John Spiers (Needle Pin Records NP1, 2020)
- A Midwinter's Night – with John Spiers (Needle Pin Records NP3, 2024)
- As the Light Draws In – with Belinda O'Hooley (Needle Pin Records NP4, 2026)
