= Golcar =

Village in West Yorkshire, England

Coordinates: 53.6378°N 1.8457°W

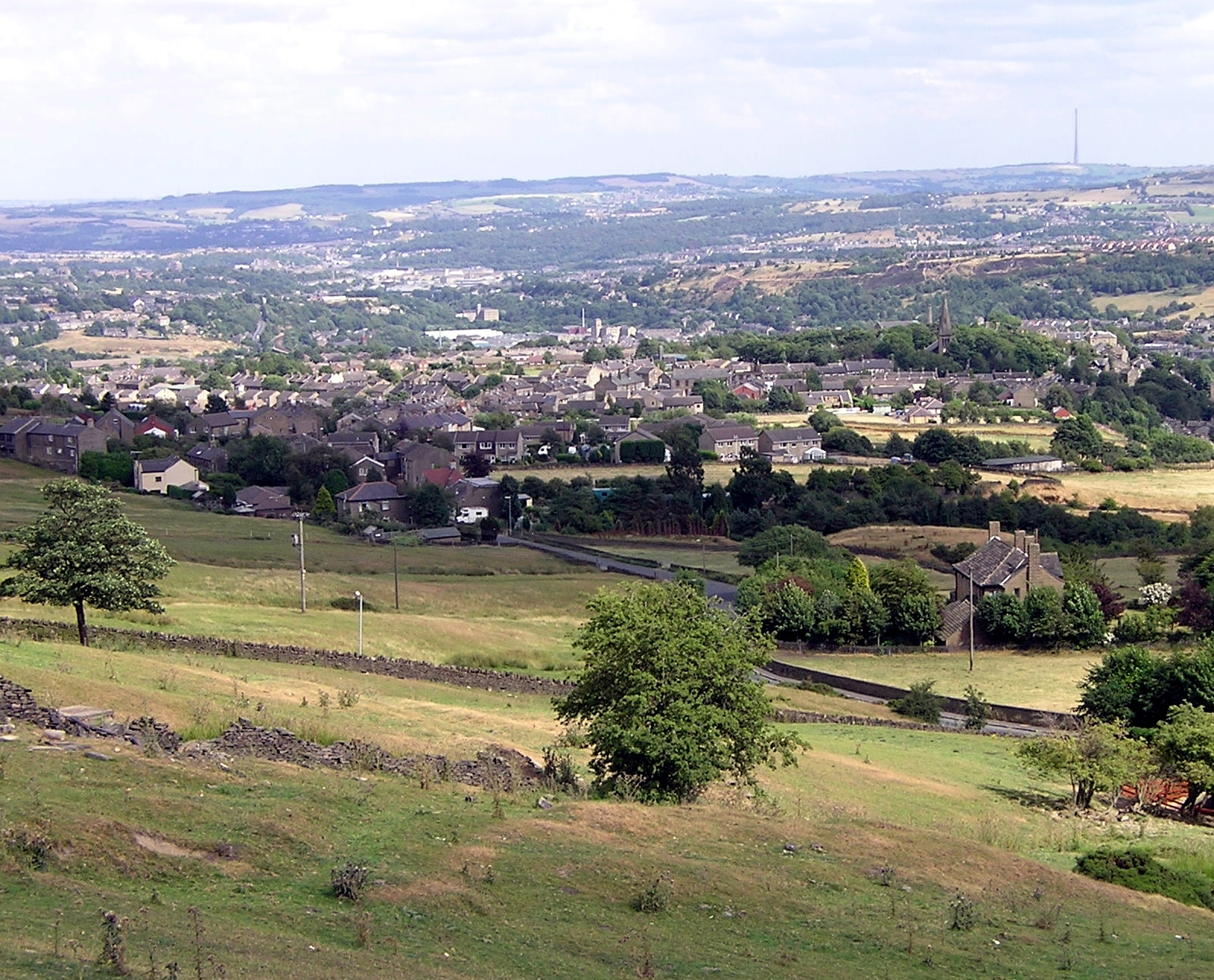
- Golcar Village

- Location within West Yorkshire
- Population: 6,900
- OS grid reference: SE1020015735
- Metropolitan borough: Kirklees
- Metropolitan county: West Yorkshire
- Region: Yorkshire and the Humber
- Country: England
- Sovereign state: United Kingdom
- Post town: HUDDERSFIELD
- Postcode district: HD7
- Dialling code: 01484
- Police: West Yorkshire
- Fire: West Yorkshire
- Ambulance: Yorkshire
- UK Parliament: Colne Valley

Golcar (pronounced /ˈɡoʊkər/) is a village on a hillside crest above the Colne Valley in the Kirklees district, in West Yorkshire, England, 3 miles (5 km) west of Huddersfield, and just north of the River Colne and the Huddersfield Narrow Canal.

The 2021 population census lists the village as having 18,725 permanent residents. The main transport access is from the A62 (Manchester Road), through Milnsbridge in the valley bottom or via Scapegoat Hill from the A640 (New Hey Road) at the top of the hill.

The township of Golcar consists of Bolster Moor, Golcar, Wellhouse, Pole Moor and Scapegoat Hill.

== History ==
Named after St Guthlac, who preached in the area during the 8th century, its name is recorded in the Domesday Book of 1086 as Goullakarres. During the Industrial Revolution Golcar became an important centre for weaving. Pharmacologist James Burrows grew up in the area.

The village has been a site of extensive dialect research. It was a site in the English Survey of English Dialects, and later a site in the Atlas Linguarum Europae.

Golcar was formerly a township and chapelry; in 1866 Golcar became a separate civil parish, and in 1894 Golcar became an urban district. On 1 April 1937 the district was abolished to form Colne Valley Urban District, part also went to the County Borough of Huddersfield. On 1 April 1937 the parish was abolished to form Colne Valley, part also went to Huddersfield. In 1931 the parish had a population of 9812.

== Colne Valley Museum ==
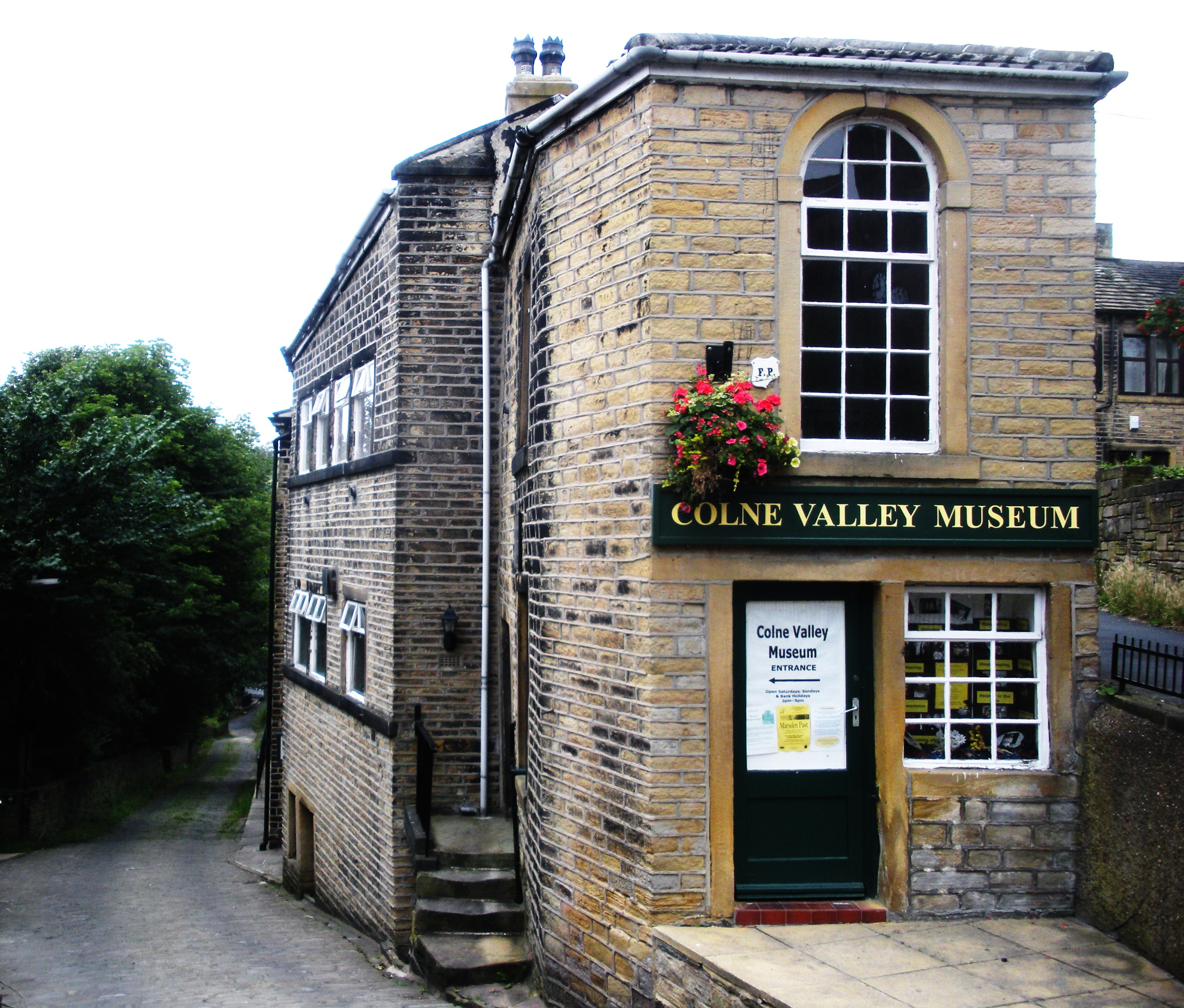
Colne Valley Museum

Three 1840s weavers' cottages were converted into the Colne Valley Museum in 1970. The museum has several restored period rooms which are used to show temporary exhibitions. The museum was extended in 2008 following the purchase of the adjoining former fish and chip shop.

Exhibits include a handloom and a spinning jenny, invented by James Hargreaves. In the loom chamber, spinning room, weavers sitting room and 'gas-lit' cloggers shop, the volunteer helpers give demonstrations of the type of crafts that would have existed during the 19th century.

The museum is run by volunteers and opens at weekends and bank holidays. Various craft and working weekends are held through the year.

== Community facilities ==
Golcar supports two scout groups: the 4th Golcar Scout Group, which was founded in 1951 and the 39th Parkwood Scout Group, founded in 1908. The village also supports Girlguiding through the 19th Huddersfield (Golcar Church) Rainbows (formed 1987), Brownies (1941) and Guides (1925).

The village has several sporting teams. Golcar United F.C who formed in 1904 and currently play in the Northern Counties East League Premier Division, their home ground being located on Longfield Avenue. The team is often referred to by fans as simple "The Village" but officially the club nickname is "The Weavers", referring to the village's textile heritage. There are two cricket teams in the village: Golcar who play in the Huddersfield Cricket League and Leymoor who play in the Halifax Cricket League.

The village has three churches: the Anglican Parish Church of St John the Evangelist opened in 1829 and is a good example of a Waterloo church; Golcar Baptist Church was founded in 1835; and Golcar Providence Methodist Church was founded in 1876.

Each year in early May the village hosts the Golcar Lily Day.

Golcar Brass Band was reformed in 1977 and practises at the Baptist Church on a Monday night.

== Schools ==
- Golcar Junior, Infant & Nursery School, Manor Road, Golcar, Huddersfield HD7 4QE
- St. John's C of E Junior & Infant School, Leymoor Road, Golcar, Huddersfield HD7 4QQ
- Beech Primary, Beech Avenue, Golcar, Huddersfield HD7 4BE
- Wellhouse Junior & Infant School, Lower Wellhouse, Golcar, Huddersfield HD7 4ES
- Clough Head Junior & Infant School, Bolster Moor Road, Golcar, Huddersfield HD7 4JU
- Scapegoat Hill Junior & Infant School, School Road, Scapegoat Hill, Golcar, Huddersfield HD7 4NU

== See also ==
- Listed buildings in Golcar

== Image gallery ==
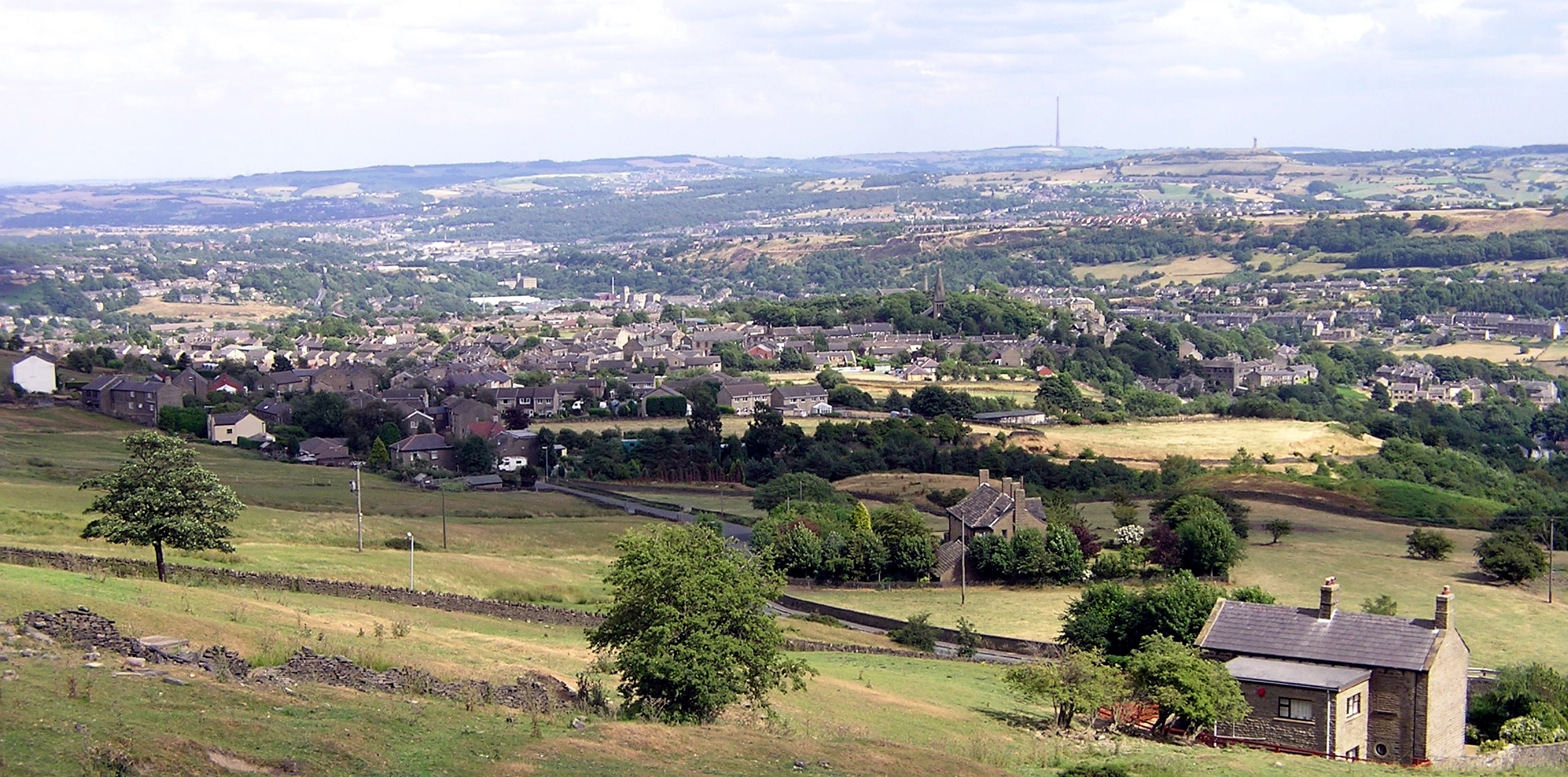
View of Golcar from Pike Law Road

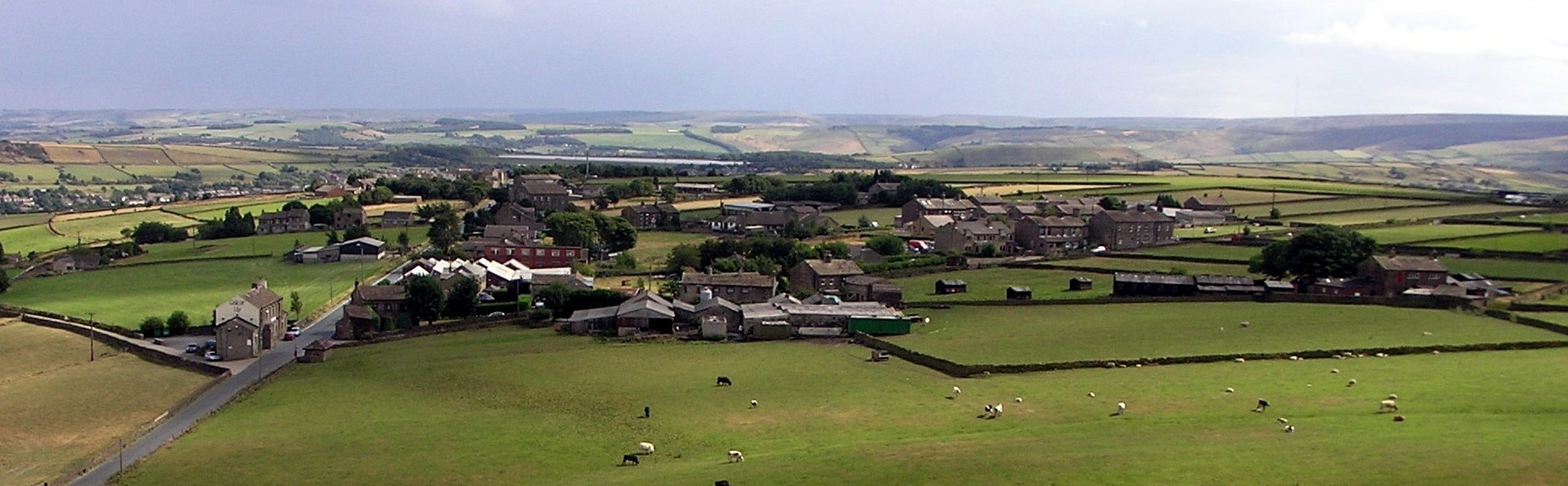
View of Bolster Moor from Pike Law Road
