= Jude Rogers =

Welsh journalist

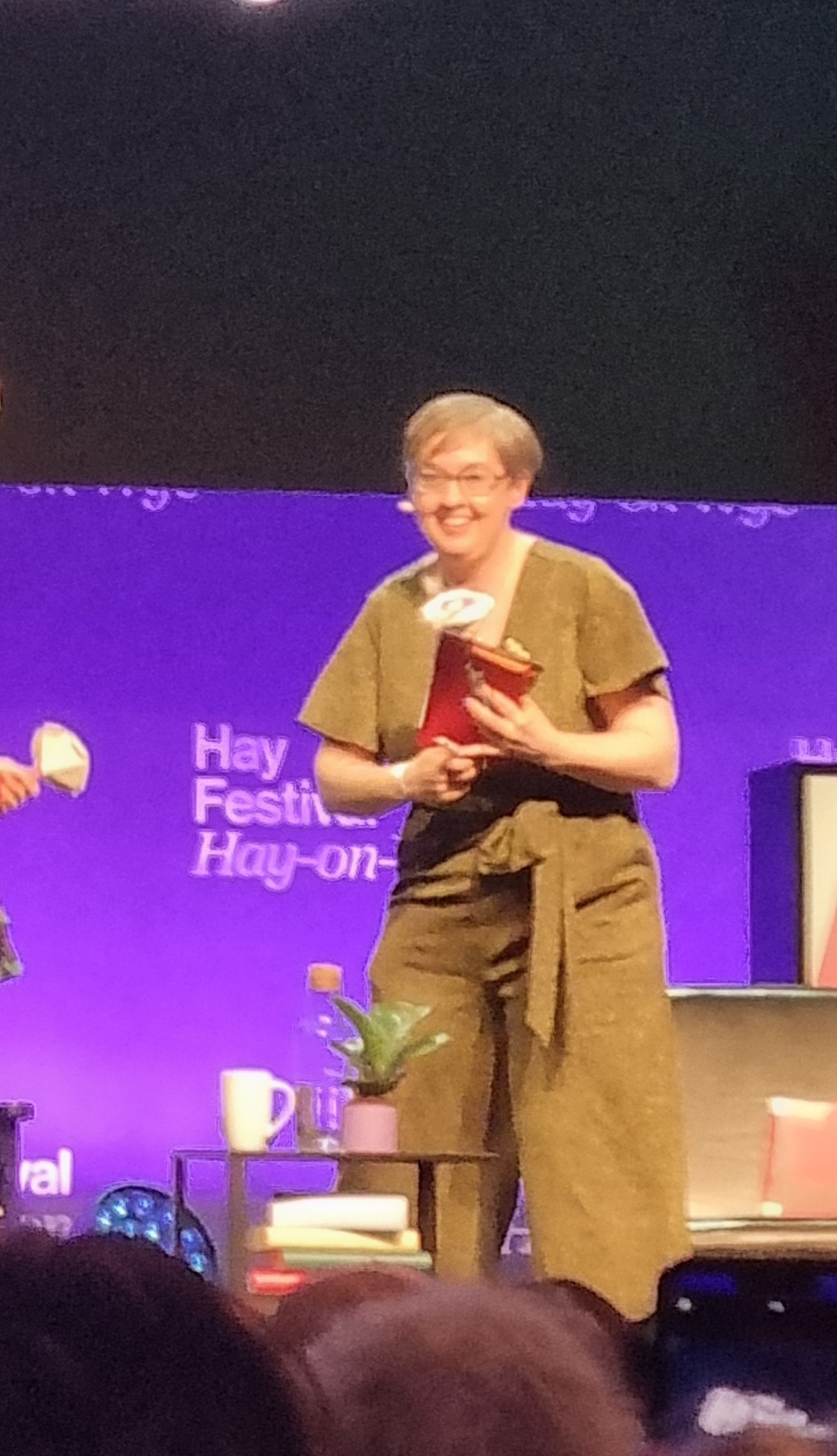
- Jude Rogers at 2025 Hay Festival
- Born: 1978 (age 47–48); Swansea, Wales
- Education: Wadham College, Oxford; Royal Holloway
- Occupations: Editor, critic, writer, lecturer
- Writing career
- Subject: Music
- Website: www.juderogers.com

Jude Rogers (born 1978) is a Welsh journalist, lecturer, arts critic and broadcaster. She is a music critic for The Guardian and also regularly writes features and articles for The Observer, New Statesman and women's magazines such as Red. Her articles have also been published by The Times and by BBC Music and she broadcasts on BBC Radio 2, BBC Radio 4 and BBC Radio 6 Music. She is a senior lecturer in journalism at London Metropolitan University.

== Early life and education ==
Rogers was born and bred in two villages near Swansea, where she went to comprehensive school. In 1997 Rogers became president of the students' union at Wadham College, Oxford. She has a degree in English from the University of Oxford and an MA from Royal Holloway.

== Professional career ==
In 2003, Rogers co-founded the magazine Smoke: a London Peculiar. After working as reviews editor on The Word, she became a full-time freelancer in 2007.

She has been a judge on several music prize panels, including the Welsh Music Prize and the Mercury Prize, and was one of ten experts chosen to write for the University of Westminster's MusicTank 10:10 project, writing about the future of music journalism.

In 2017 she scripted an audio guided tour, narrated by Jarvis Cocker, for ABBA: Super Troupers, an exhibition at the Southbank Centre, London, about the Swedish pop group ABBA.

In 2022, Rogers published The Sound of Being Human: How Music Shapes Our Lives, an account of the emotional and psychological impact of music. Reviewing the book, Ian Rankin wrote "Too often we treat popular music as wallpaper surrounding us as we live our lives. Jude Rogers shows the emotional and cerebral heft such music can have. It's a personal journey which becomes universal. Fascinating."

== Personal life ==
She and her husband Dan, whom she married in 2011, have a son, Evan, born in 2014. They live in Monmouthshire, Wales, having moved there in 2016 from Leyton, north east London.

== Publications ==
- Matt Haynes (editor) & Jude Rogers (editor) (2013): From the Slopes of Olympus to the Banks of the Lea, Smoke: a London Peculiar. ISBN 978-0957568006
- Jude Rogers and Alex Farebrother-Naylor (2016): Pop!, Fisherton Press. ISBN 978-0993077333
- Jude Rogers (2022): The Sound of Being Human: How Music Shapes Our Lives, White Rabbit Books. ISBN 9781474622929
