= No Masters =

British independent record label

No Masters is a British record label, based in the north of England, specialising in folk with a political edge.

The label was founded in 1990 by John Tams and Jim Boyes. Originally working as singer, John Tams is now famous as an actor in the TV series Sharpe. He does much of the production work of the label. Keyboard-player Jim Boyes is part of the trio Coope Boyes and Simpson. The best known recordings that have been issued on the label are by Chumbawamba, Coope Boyes and Simpson, Token Women and The Fraser Sisters. The songs address social issues, both historical and contemporary. Most of the artists named above have appeared at the 2006 Beverley Festival. In 2003, the BBC Radio 3 programme Late Junction broadcast a special edition on tracks from the label.

== See also ==
- List of record labels
