= Nottamun Town =

Traditional song

"Nottamun Town" (Roud 1044), also known as "Nottingham Fair" or "Fair Nottamon Town", is an American folk song. Although sometimes suggested to be an English song of medieval origin, and still described as such in some popular works, it is more likely derived from popular 18th and 19th century printed broadsides, with the most likely immediate precursor being the 19th century "Paddy's Ramble to London".

The British musicologist Cecil Sharp collected the best-known version of the song in 1917 in the area of the Eastern Kentucky Coalfield. Josiah Combs had previously collected it in the same area, and other versions were found later in the century by Creighton in Nova Scotia, by Randolph in Missouri, and even in New Jersey. However, very closely related songs, such as the stage comedy song "The Old Grey Mare", were in fact well known in print form in America during the 19th century.

== Lyrics ==
Nearly all modern versions of the song are based on the version recorded in the 1950s by Jean Ritchie, the text of which was originally collected by Sharp in 1917 from the singing of Ritchie's older sister Una. Modern versions often include lyrics (such as the phrase "mule roany mare" and the first two lines of the fifth verse) first introduced, and later copyrighted, by Jean Ritchie herself:

In fair Nottamun Town, not a soul would look up
Not a soul would look up, not a soul would look down
Not a soul would look up, not a soul would look down
To show me the way to fair Nottamun Town

I rode a grey horse, a mule roany mare
Grey mane and grey tail, green striped on his back
Grey mane and grey tail, green striped on his back
There weren't a hair on her but what was coal black

She stood so still, She threw me to the dirt
She tore-a my hide, and she bruised my shirt
From saddle to stirrup I mounted again
And on my ten toes I rode over the plain

Met the King and the Queen and the company more
Came a riding behind and a walking before
Come a stark naked drummer, a-beating a drum
With his heels in his bosom come marching along

They laughed and they smiled, not a soul did look gay
They talked all the while, not a word they did say
I bought me a quart to drive gladness away
And to stifle the dust, for it rained the whole day

Sat down on a hard, hot cold frozen stone
Ten thousand stood round me yet I was alone
Took my hat in my hand, for to keep my head warm
Ten thousand got drowned that never was born

Although Ritchie believed the song had only been preserved in her family, very similar versions were known locally only a few years earlier. The Kentucky song collector Josiah Combs found a text printed in 1910 in a chapbook Wehman Bros' Good Old-Time Songs, No. 1 as "Fair Nottingham Town", and collected a nearly identical version in 1910 from State Senator Hilliard Smith, including additional stanzas, under the title "Fair Nottamon Town":

As I went down to Nottamon fair
I rode a stone horse they called the gray mare;
She had a green list down her back:
And there wasn't a hair but what was coal black.

She stood still, but she threw me in the mud
She daubed my hide and bruised my shirt,
From saddle to stirrup I mounted her again,
And on my ten toes rode over the plain.

I met the king and the queen and a company more
A-riding behind and walking before,
And a stark naked drummer a-beating his drum,
With his heels in his ass a-marching along.

I asked them the way to fair Nottamon town,
They were so mad not a soul look-ed down-
They were so mad not a soul look-ed down
To tell me the way to fair Nottamon town. (Note: Combs' source forgot part of the stanza and simply reversed and repeated its first two lines, but earlier printed versions suggest the missing lines were "The drums they did rattle and the people did stare / T'see a coach and six horses drawn by a gray mare" (Randolph, 1992, p.304))

When I got there, no one could I see,
They all stood around a-looking at me;
I called for a quart to drive gladness away,
To stifle the dust - it had rained the whole day.

I sat on a cold hot frozen stone,
Ten thousand standing 'round me, yet I was alone;
Ten thousand got drownded before they were born,
I took my hat in my hand to keep my head warm.

Then I'll take my black horse and a-fishing I'll go,
A-fishing I'll go, whether or no;
My fish they turned over, my wagon did spill -
I'll sell my gray mare - I'll be damned if I will!

The first girl I have, it shall be a boy,
Returned to the house of my first joy;
The first house I live in, it shall be a hog-pen,
And what-in-the-hell will become of me then?

== Origins ==
There has been a great deal of speculation on the song's origins and meaning; its reference to Nottingham has been taken to suggest an origin in England. One often stated theory, originally suggested to Ritchie by EFDSS director Douglas Kennedy, is that it is of medieval origin and derives from a song associated with an English Mummers' play, which often featured absurd topsy-turvy imagery, though Ritchie was unable to find records supporting this. A second is that it might refer to the English Civil War, in which Charles I of England raised his first army around Nottingham: a popular theme at the time with diarists and pamphleteers was 'The World Turned Upside Down'.

However, there is no particular evidence of any 'hidden' meaning in "Nottamun Town", and broadly similar "songs of marvels and lies" are very common; "Nottamun Town" appears to be a late example and no evidence has been found supporting a connection with mumming or Nottingham itself.

A more likely interpretation is that the words of "Nottamun Town" and other American versions ultimately derive from the early 18th century broadside "Teague's Ramble", or "Teague's Ramble to the Camp", a story of an Irish soldier travelling to England which includes a series of very similar contradictions and absurdities. "Teague's Ramble" and various imitations were printed in several English or Scottish broadsides of c.1740, as well as in Boston, Massachusetts as early as 1748; its tune was used to set a number of other songs and was performed "with variations" on the Dublin stage in 1750. The song was one of a large number of the period mocking the Irish, although its subject matter of an Irishman joining the King's army at Salisbury Plain and references to "Holland's Genever" suggest it may specifically originate as an anti-Catholic satire on the Revolution of 1688, when there were rumours of Irish armies being sent to England.

By the early 19th century a popular broadside version called "Paddy's Ramble to London" was circulating in America, and may have formed the source for "Nottamun Town". The text was adapted by singers to include local or topical references, such as the phrase "ten thousand drownded" apparently added in reference to the 1889 Johnstown Flood; another version has the gray mare attending the Battle of Bull Run.

Other than mid-19th century printed versions such as "The Old Grey Mare", variants similar to Ritchie's were collected elsewhere in America during the 20th century. These include "Nottingham Fair", a version collected in 1941 in Walnut Shade, Missouri from the singing of Charles Ingenthron; a 1969 version from the Ozarks, "Adam Ham Town", from the singing of Ollie Gilbert; and another collected from Bill Jackson, a migrant worker in California in 1941, "That Awkward Old Song". A variant was even collected in Newfoundland under the title "Paddy Backwards". However, most commercial versions postdating the American folk-music revival, such as the well-known versions recorded by Fairport Convention and Bert Jansch, derive from Jean Ritchie's version. Shirley Collins and Davy Graham’s 1964 recording, an important addition to the second British folk revival, likewise bears a close similarity to Ritchie’s.

== Derivative works ==
The song's melody was used by Woody Guthrie for his 1941 song "Pastures of Plenty" and then by Bob Dylan for his 1963 song "Masters of War" on the album The Freewheelin' Bob Dylan. Dylan's interpretation influenced John Lennon's song "Working Class Hero". Iain Matthews used the melody for his song "So Many Eyes" on the 1996 album God Looked Down. However, there was previously a reference in Second Spring (1969) on the track "Southern Comfort" written by Sylvia Tyson.

The British folk artist Steve Tilston has recorded a version with contemporary lyrics on his 2011 album The Reckoning; The English folk trio Lady Maisery recorded a version of this song, "Nottamun Fair", which appears on their 2011 album Weave and Spin. Cats Laughing recorded the song on Another Way to Travel, and John Langstaff recorded it on the album of the same name. LISTENBEE also produced a house version of the song in 2015, which samples the original recording by Jean Ritchie. English folk duo Jacob & Drinkwater included a version on their 2019 album, This Old River.
