= 1688 invasion of England =

Dutch invasion during the Nine Years' War

- Part of the Glorious Revolution and Nine Years' War
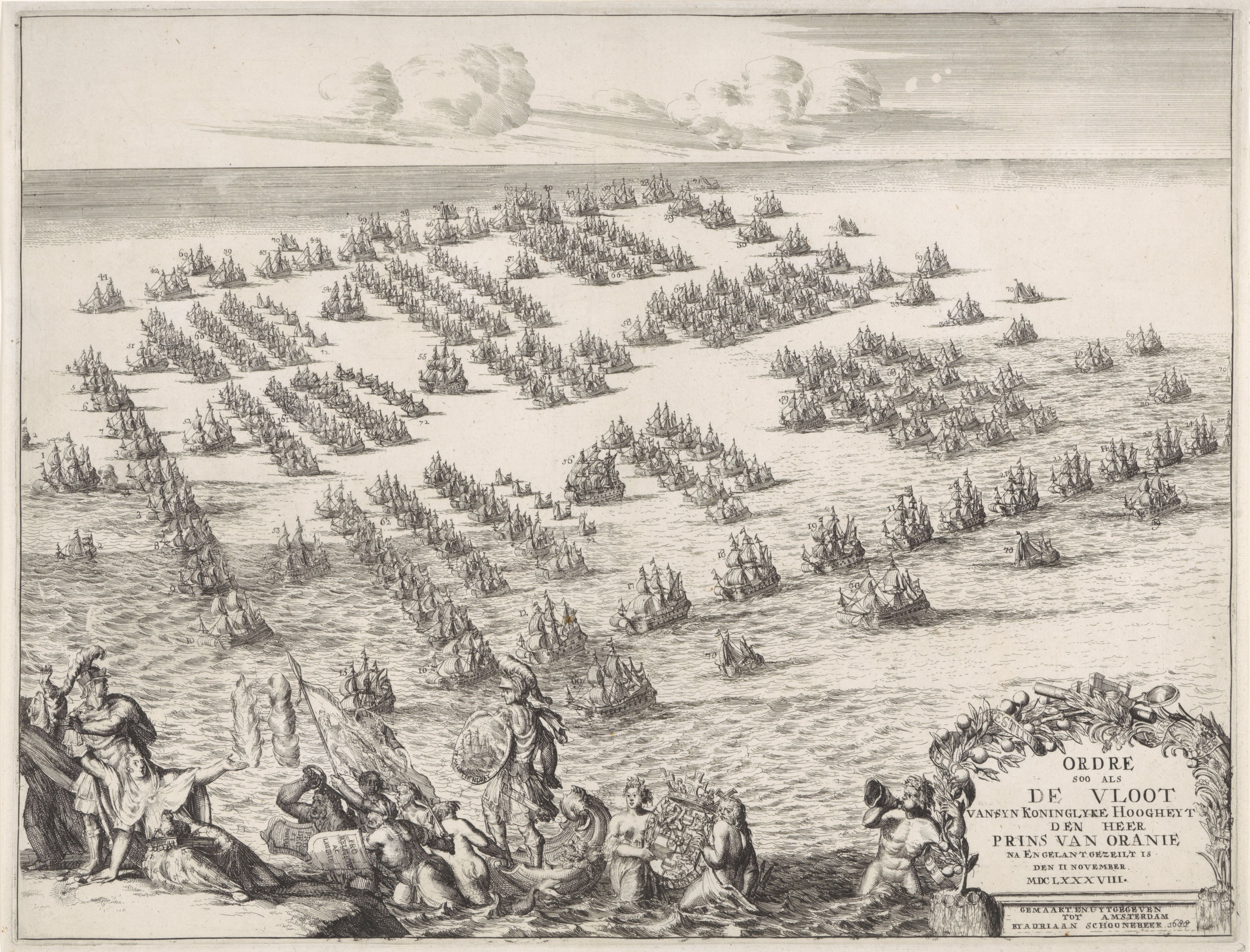
- The sailing order of the Dutch fleet.
Date	November – December 1688
Location	North Sea, English Channel and England
Result	Dutch-Williamite victory

Belligerents
Dutch Republic; Williamites	(Kingdom of England) English Government

Commanders and leaders
(Dutch Republic) William III (Dutch Republic) Schomberg (Dutch Republic) Herbert (Dutch Republic) Evertsen	James II; Feversham; Churchill; Dartmouth

Strength
Army strength 16,000-21,000 men Naval strength 40 ships of the line 9 frigates 28 galliots 9 fireships 400 transport vessels	Army strength 30,000 men Naval strength 30 ships of the line 4 frigates 14 fire ships

Casualties and losses
low	low

The 1688 invasion of England by William of Orange was a large-scale military operation mounted by the Dutch Republic to secure England as an ally against France in the coming Nine Years' War. Although framed as a defence of English liberties, the expedition was planned primarily to prevent an Anglo-French alignment and avoid a repeat of the crisis of 1672. With an invitation from seven prominent Englishmen providing political cover, William assembled one of the largest fleets in European history, carrying an experienced and well-equipped army to England in November 1688. The Royal Navy attempted to intercept the invasion fleet, but was outnumbered and hampered by adverse winds, allowing the Dutch to land at Torbay largely unopposed.

The subsequent land campaign was marked more by desertion and the political collapse of James II's regime than by major fighting. James's retreat from Salisbury surrendered the strategic initiative to William, while his eventual flight to France allowed Dutch troops to occupy London with little resistance. James was subsequently deposed, and in 1689 William and his wife Mary, James's daughter, were crowned joint monarchs of England. The invasion thus precipitated the political settlement known as the Glorious Revolution and helped bring England into the war against Louis XIV.

== Prelude ==
To prevent an alliance between England and France in the upcoming Nine Years' War and a repeat of 1672, William III of Orange and the Dutch States General resolved to stage a pre-emptive strike on England. William was careful not to appear as a conqueror, and his marriage with Mary Stuart combined with domestic unrest in England allowed him to request an invitation from seven prominent Englishmen. The invitation from the "Immortal Seven" in early July 1688 gave William's planned expedition the veneer of legitimacy he wanted.

=== Preparations ===
The seven politicians who invited William III to intervene in England were confident of the invasion's prospects for success. They assessed that "nineteen parts of twenty of the people are desirous of a change," noting widespread dissatisfaction among army officers and a strong aversion to Catholicism among the soldiers. Despite this optimism, William III deemed it essential to assemble a formidable army and navy to ensure nothing was left to chance. While the English conspirators recommended a small force supported by a large fleet, William insisted on commanding enough troops to decisively confront James II's army if necessary.

The preparations for the expedition were managed collaboratively by William, Hans Willem Bentinck, Gaspar Fagel, Job de Wildt (Secretary of the Amsterdam Admiralty), and Lieutenant-Admiral Cornelis Evertsen. Financial backing came primarily from the States General, which decided in late July to expand the Dutch fleet by 9,000 personnel. To fund this expansion, a state loan of 4 million guilders was issued at William's request. Additional financial support came from Francisco Lopes Suasso, a financier of Portuguese-Jewish origin, who lent 2 million guilders. When asked about collateral, Suasso famously responded, "If you succeed, I know you will repay me; if not, I will accept the loss."

The actual invasion force comprised around 15,000 Dutch soldiers, reinforced by between 1,000 and 5,000 British and French volunteers. To safeguard the homeland against the threat of a French attack, 30,000 troops stayed behind, bolstered by an additional 19,000 elite German and Swedish forces that were hired by the Dutch. Half of the troops and the entire fleet crew were funded by the city of Amsterdam, with minimal involvement from the other Dutch admiralties except Rotterdam. The combined expenses for the army and navy exceeded 7 million guilders. The operation was conducted in secrecy, and while it was impossible to fully conceal such a vast invasion force, uncertainty persisted in England until November as to whether the fleet was aimed at France or intended for an invasion of England: in part because it was hard for James II and other experienced naval officers to imagine that the Dutch would risk such a fleet to the autumn weather.

Until September, William and his confidants had deliberately concealed whether the growing Dutch military force was intended for France or England, waiting to see how Louis XIV would react. The French king, confident in James II's position, saw little cause for concern regarding England. He had threatened to declare war on the Republic as soon as its fleet set sail; and, in the worst case, he assumed that William III would become entangled in a prolonged conflict there. The French fleet was in the Mediterranean because Louis was seriously considering an invasion of the Papal States and therefore unable to come to James's aid. When Louis, in September, ordered the occupation of Papal Avignon, deployed a garrison to Cologne and the Palatinate, and laid siege to Philippsburg, William III deemed it the right moment to disclose the planned expedition to the Dutch States General. Louis had with his actions in effect cleared the path for William's mission to England.

The fact that the invasion of England would take place exactly a century after the Spanish Armada sailed against England was not lost on contemporary observers across Europe. The Polish ambassador in The Hague noted:

The Dutch are convinced that they will be as fortunate in their plan to attack England as Philip II was unfortunate when he sent his formidable fleet against Elizabeth in August 1588. There are few among them who are unaware of this period of history...

== Opposing forces ==
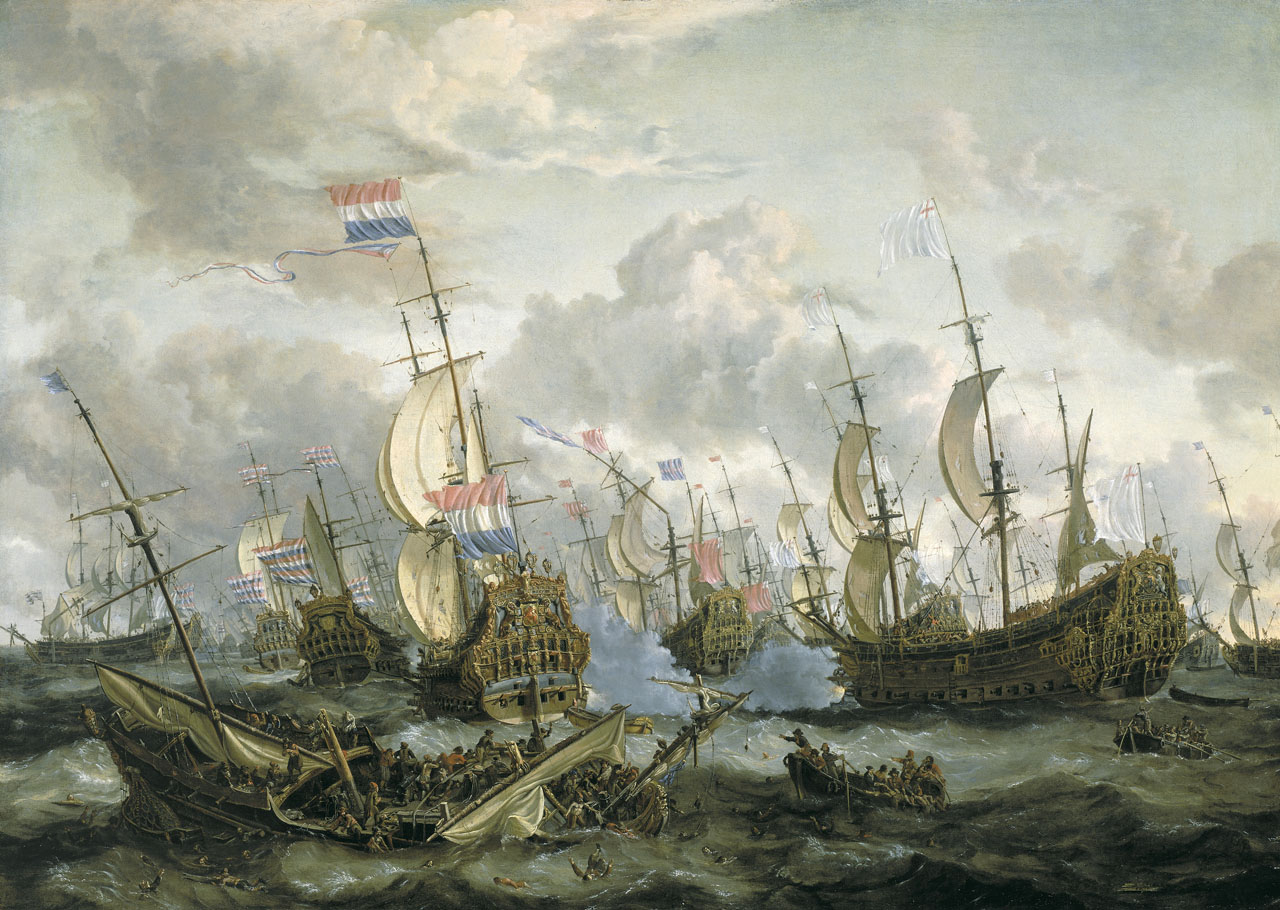
Dutch and English warships clash in the Four Days' Battle, 1666. By Abraham Storck.

=== English navy ===
During the seventeenth century, the English and Dutch navies had repeatedly competed for supremacy at sea. By the 1670s the Dutch Republic possessed Europe's largest fleet, while attempts to expand the English navy were hampered by financial and political difficulties. In 1675, Samuel Pepys reported that England possessed 92 warships, compared with 136 in the Dutch Republic. A major English building programme was subsequently authorised in 1677, providing for thirty new ships. However, political turmoil during the Exclusion Crisis and Charles II's increasing financial dependence on France contributed to the neglect of the navy. Pepys was imprisoned in 1679 and replaced by a naval commission he considered incompetent and corrupt, while Charles governed without Parliament during the final four years of his reign. Maintenance suffered accordingly, and of the twenty surviving English first- and second-rates, only three were in commission in 1688.

Pepys returned to office in 1684 and under James II attempted to restore the navy. In 1686 he proposed a three-year programme costing £1.29 million, but James's deteriorating relations with Parliament left the government increasingly short of money. When the fleet was mobilised in 1688, Pepys complained that although its strength had risen to 13,000 men, he had received only £1,000 towards the £29,866 required merely to feed 8,000 sailors for four months. Consequently, when William sailed in November, only about thirty English warships were fit for service. None of the largest ships had been mobilised, and the most heavily armed vessel available carried 70 guns. Larger ships had not been made ready in the summer and by November, it was considered too late in the season to send them to sea anyway. (Note: In November 1688, Dartmouth's fleet consisted of thirty-one ships of the line. His flagship was the Resolution of 70 cannon. Furthermore there were the third-rates Elizabeth, Defiance, Cambridge, Monmouth, Dreadnought, Warspite, Mary, Edgar, Henrietta, Rupert and Essex. Additionally the fourth-rates Newcastle, Woolwich, Swallow, Bonadventure, Foresight, Bristol, Jersey, Crown, Tiger, St. Albans, Dover, Advice, Mordaunt, Constant Warwick, Centurion, Hampshire, Ruby, Kingfisher and Sedgemoor were present. The fleet was supported by the frigates Pearl, Lark, Greyhound and the former royal yacht Saudadoes, as well as over a dozen fireships.)

While James himself had more experience in leading large fleets than any of his naval commanders, having been Lord High Admiral between 1660 and 1673, he seemingly never considered leading the English fleet himself in 1688. Instead he put George Legge, Baron Dartmouth, a personal favourite of the king, in command of the fleet. Though very loyal, Dartmouth lacked an impressive career to boast of and was naturally cautious and indecisive. He had only commanded a fleet once before, and that was a small squadron tasked with the evacuation of Tangier. Despite distinguishing himself as a ship's captain during the Third Anglo-Dutch War, Dartmouth was primarily a land officer and a politician rather than a seasoned naval commander. The British naval historian J. D. Davies writes:

...throughout the campaign of 1688 he was bombarded with advice from the one man who undoubtedly had the experience and personal courage to lead the British fleet to victory, but sadly for his own prospects of survival, the ideal candidate was disqualified because he wore the crown.

=== English army ===
At the time of William's invasion in 1688, the English army had undergone a modest expansion under James II but remained relatively small compared to continental standards. Following the Monmouth Rebellion in 1685, the army had grown to approximately 19,778 soldiers, including garrison troops and field units. By the autumn of 1688, bolstered by 2,820 men from Ireland and the entirety of the 2,946-strong Scottish army, James's forces theoretically numbered almost 40,000 on paper. But even on paper the actual number of trained and battle ready troops was closer to 29,000–30,000, with some still undergoing training and others on garrison duty. More modern scholarship suggests that the field army James assembled on Salisbury Plain would ultimately effectively consist of just 19,000 men. And despite the apparent growth, many of the newer regiments lacked sufficient training and equipment, reducing their effectiveness in the field.

Overlooking John Churchill, James II had appointed Louis de Duras, Earl of Feversham as commander-in-chief in 1685. Feversham was a long-time associate of James since the 1660s and the nephew of the famed Turenne. However, his leadership would prove inadequate. At the decisive Battle of Sedgemoor on 6 July, Feversham's poor judgment nearly cost James the victory, and it was through Churchill's efforts that saved the situation. Despite Feversham's incompetence, the credit of the victory went to him, and James reappointed him in 1688. James himself arrived at Salisbury on 29 November, where Feversham had already assembled part of the army, and, unlike in the case of the navy, assumed personal command. In earlier years, he had been a courageous and experienced soldier, serving with the French and Spanish armies during his exile and later commanding the English fleet against the Dutch. He had, however, never led a large army on campaign, and by 1688 it had been many years since he had last served with an army in the field. Moreover, the political and military turmoil surrounding the invasion had severely shaken his confidence.

=== Conspiracy ===
Although the vast majority of James II's army remained loyal throughout the campaign, a small group of senior officers secretly established contact with William of Orange before the invasion. The conspirators included John Churchill, Charles Trelawny and Percy Kirke. On 14 August 1688 Churchill wrote to William 'I think it is what I owe to God and my country, my honor I take leave to put into your Royalle Highnesses hands'. Historian Wouter Troost argues that the conspiracy was the decisive factor in convincing William to proceed with the invasion. James was aware of the plot, and the Earl of Feversham urged him to arrest the conspirators, but the king took no action. During the campaign only a limited number of officers and soldiers actually defected, but the conspiracy had a disproportionate psychological effect. It undermined James's confidence in the loyalty of his commanders.

=== William's invasion fleet ===
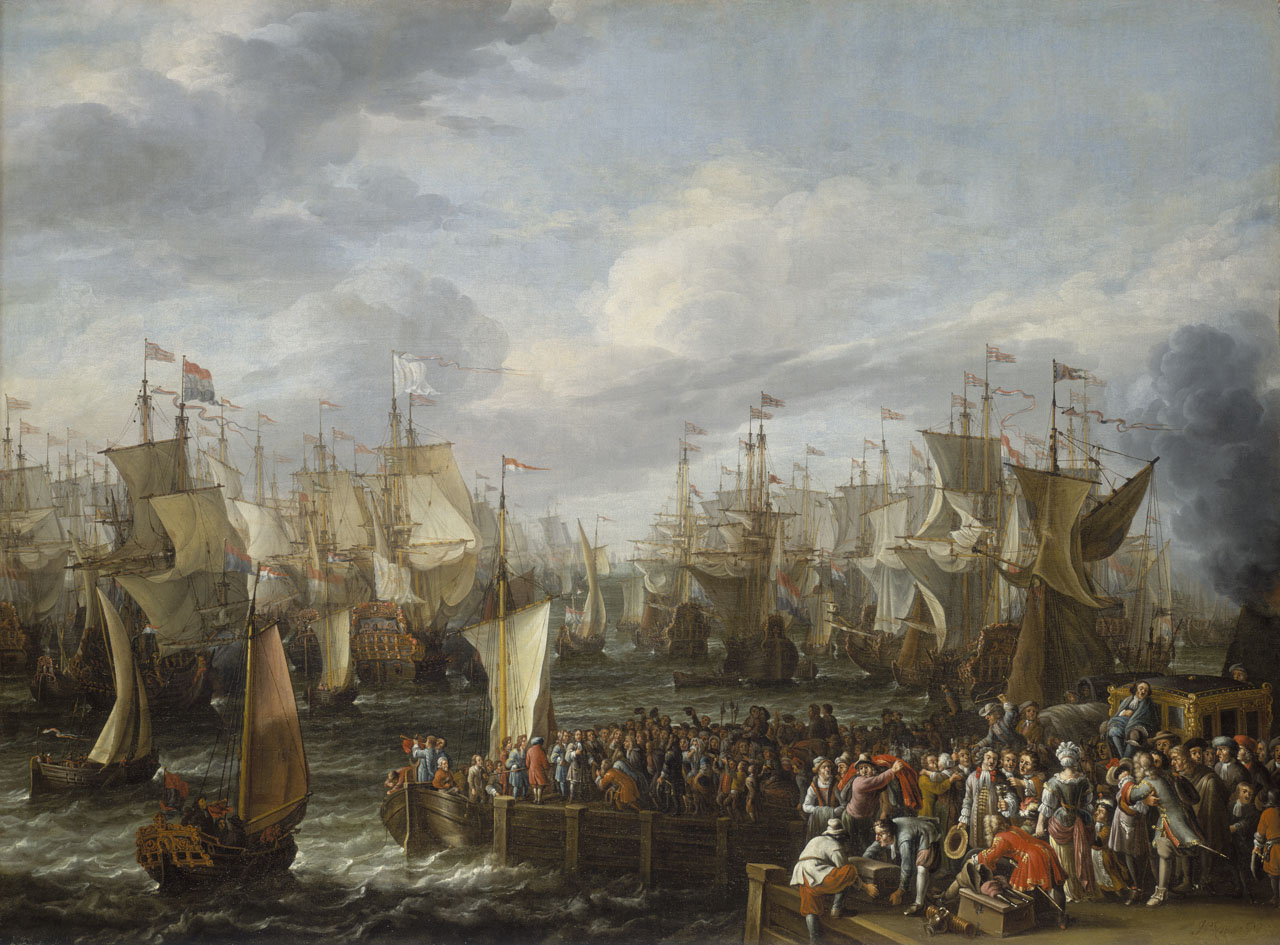
The Dutch fleet depicted at the departure of William III from Hellevoetsluis, 29 October 1688. By Jan Claesz Rietschoof.

To transport William and his army to England, the Dutch Republic outfitted a massive fleet. Forty-nine warships were prepared to protect more than 400 transport and landing vessels from the English navy. As with the English fleet, one was hesitant to send the largest ships to sea so late in the year, and the largest warships carried only 68 cannon. Three new first charter three-deckers of 90 cannon were readied, alarming the English, but in late October the bad weather led to the decision to leave them in port. (Note: See De Jonge or Bender for full lists of the Dutch naval forces. Bender gives the Maze, Maagd van Dordrecht, Delft, Schieland, Honselaardijk, Zeelandia, Rotterdam, Gorcum, Briel, Leyden, Provincie van Utrecht, Wapen van Utrecht, Zeelandia, Friesland, Gideon, Akerboom, Elswout, Agatha, Castricum, Beemster, Stad en Lande, Vrede, Noordholland, Nijmegen, Harderwijk, Maria Elisabeth, Schattershoef, Sneek, Edam, Oud-Carspel, Asperen, Anna, Hazewind, Wulpenburg, Damiaten, Brak, Bommel, Postiljon, Neptunus, Bruynvisch, Cortgene, Gekroonde Burg, Veere, Goes, Somer, Noorderkwartier, Wapen van Hoorn and Mercurius) With 30,000–40,000 men aboard, it was the largest fleet the Republic would ever assemble and while significantly larger than the Spanish Armada of 1588, it was assembled in little more than a 10th of the time.

Arthur Herbert, the ex-Royal Navy officer who carried the invitation to William with him in June 1688, was actively involved in the preparations for the 1688 invasion and for propaganda purposes the Prince appointed him as the acting lieutenant-admiral general of the Dutch States Navy and commander-in-chief of the fleet which would take him to England on 6 October. William hoped that this would make it easier for English naval officers to desert to him. However, Lieutenant-Admiral Cornelis Evertsen the Youngest, a distinguished naval commander and a trusted friend of William, remained in command during the preparations and after the campaign to England. Additionally the Prince decreed that until the moment of rendezvous with the English fleet, Herbert would share command with Eversten and consult with him on all significant matters. Cornelis Tromp, the famous ageing Dutch officer who still nominally held the post of lieutenant-admiral general, had fallen out of favour with William and was not consulted.

=== William's army ===
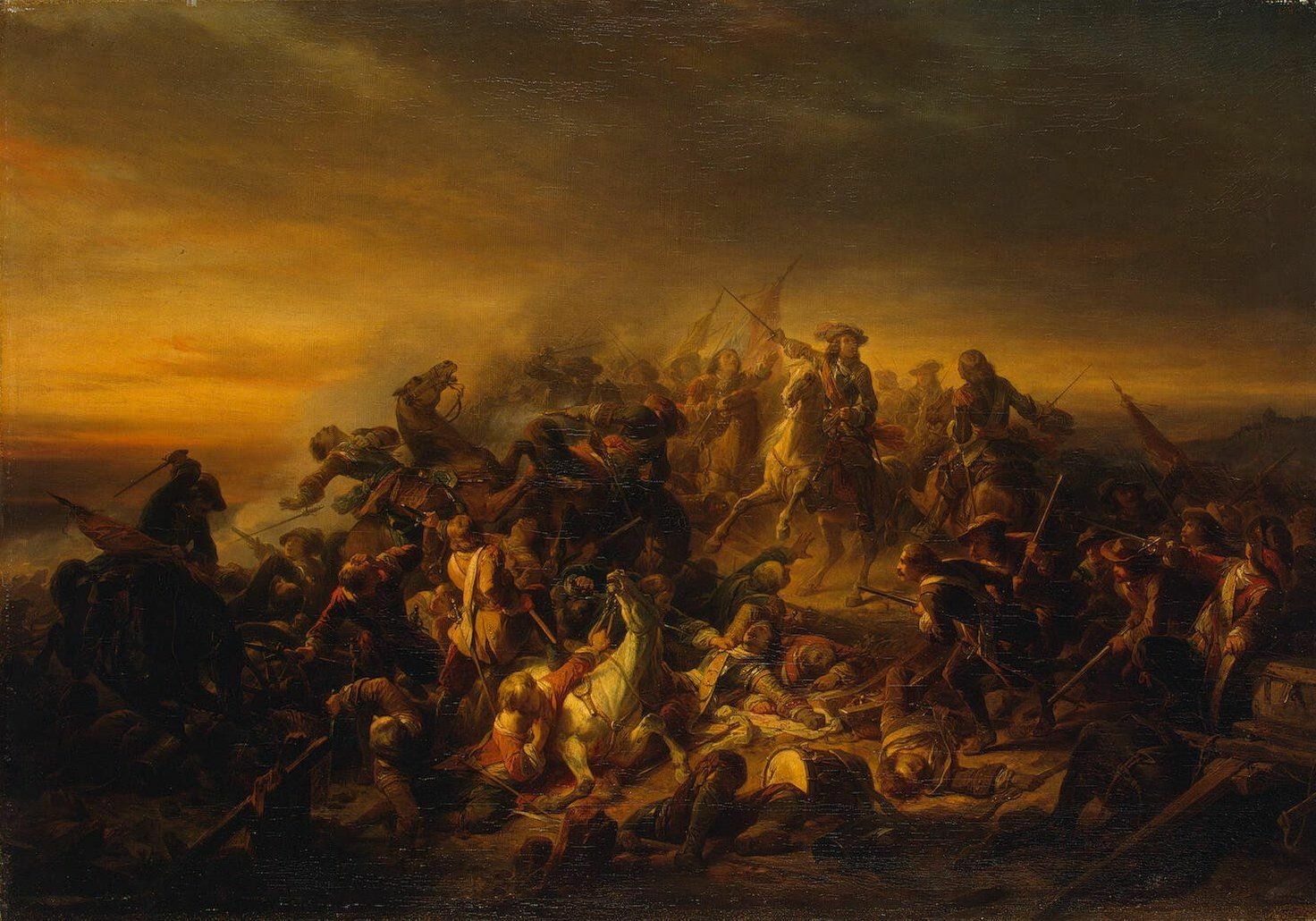
19th century painting of William III at the Battle of Seneffe in 1674. By Nicaise De Keyser.

William took 15,269 troops with him that formed part of the Dutch States Army. The quality of these troops was superior to the forces James could muster. Many were experienced veterans and 2,500 of the 11,000 infantrymen were part of the elite Dutch Blue Guards and 3,000 of the elite Scots Brigade. Additionally, due to the reforms of William and Georg of Waldeck during and after the Franco-Dutch War, Dutch infantry had acquired a reputation for being the best in Europe. Dutch infantry was better trained and more disciplined than their peers and in 1688 also enjoyed a technological advantage in weaponry. Dutch soldiers were equipped with the new flintlock muskets which meant they could achieve a higher rate of fire. Dutch artillery crews were equally well regarded, and William brought an unusually large artillery train, including heavy 24-pounder cannons that required at least sixteen horses each to transport. Such guns were generally used in major sieges or to fire grapeshot on the battlefield. Since England possessed only two fortresses that warranted artillery of this calibre, their inclusion suggests that William was prepared for major battles or a prolonged military campaign in Britain. Although the reputation of the Dutch cavalry was not on par with the infantry and artillery, half of the cavalry William brought with him consisted of elite regiments. Ignatius White, James II's envoy extraordinary in the Dutch Republic, wrote: 'There is not in Christendom a better army of the number,' and; 'you may thinke what you please, they dont believe they will meet with great opposition.' It is commonly accepted that this army was supplemented by 5,000 British exiles and Huguenots who volunteered, although modern calculations by Dutch historians Machiel Bosman and Arthur der Weduwen reduce their number to just over a 1,000 men. (Note: Contemporary propaganda and various later historical accounts of the Glorious Revolution have claimed that William's invading army included 200 enslaved Africans and Scandinavian soldiers wearing black armour and bearskin caps, with some more fantastical accounts even describing them as carrying flaming swords. Although Scandinavian soldiers did serve in various Dutch regiments, recent research has found no evidence to substantiate these more elaborate claims, suggesting that they are likely mythical.)

William III personally led the army. He was a capable military commander who had gained experience with leading large armies during the Franco-Dutch War. As his deputy commander he appointed the seasoned general Frederick Schomberg. The Duke of Schomberg had served in the French army, but since he was a protestant had left France for the Dutch Republic in 1685 after the Edict of Fontainebleau. (Note: At the time of the Eighty Years' War Schomberg had served in the Dutch army, under Frederick Henry or Orange.) While the 72 year old had been one of Louis XIV's better commanders, his advanced age had diminished his abilities and by the end of 1689 some believed that he was no longer fit for high command. For other important posts in the army William choose some of his most trusted friends and relatives, like the Count of Solms, Hendrik van Nassau-Ouwerkerk and Willem Bentinck. The Prince of Waldeck remained in the Dutch Republic, where he assumed command of the Dutch and allied forces left to defend the Low Countries.

== Naval campaign ==
=== Setbacks for William ===
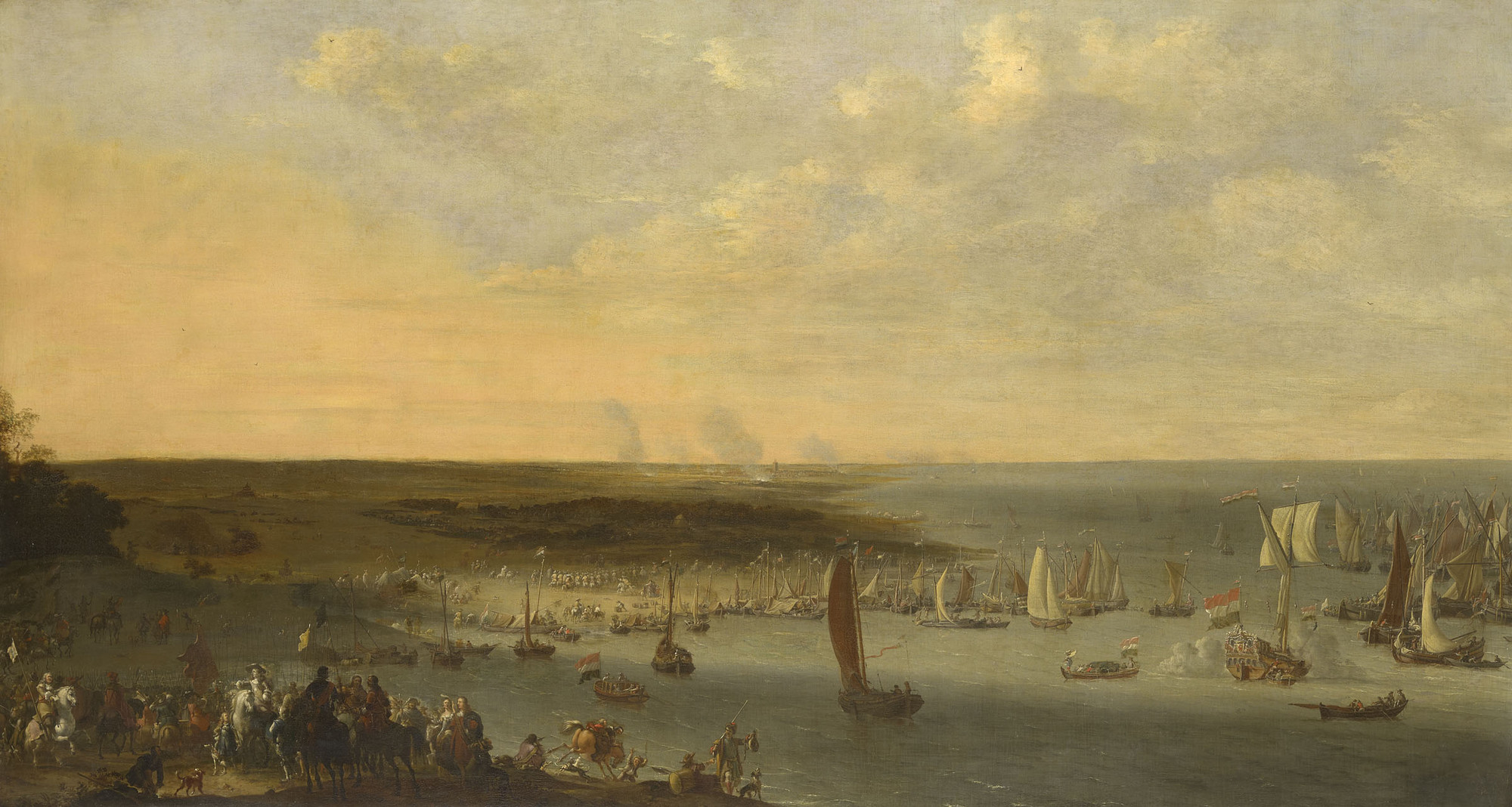
The Dutch invasion army embarking at Brielle and Hellevoetsluis.

From early October onwards, the preparations for the invasion of England by the Dutch fleet, under Prince William, became more public. The majority of the newly outfitted warships joined the fleet, with several admirals in command of various divisions, including Lieutenant-Admiral Willem Bastiaensz Schepers, Rear Admiral Gilles Schey, Vice-Admiral Van de Putte, and others overseeing the ships from Amsterdam, the Admiralty of the Noorderkwartier, and Zeeland. However, the fleet faced challenges due to severe storms, which caused significant damage to several ships. Prince William, concerned that further damage could jeopardize the entire mission, ordered the fleet to retreat to Goedereede for repairs. Despite the setbacks, the fleet eventually regrouped and by 26 October, now fully repaired and ready, awaited favourable winds for the journey.

To protect the vulnerable transports during the crossing, the warships were arranged around them in three squadrons: the experienced Vice-Admiral Philips van Almonde commanded the port squadron under the white flag, Evertsen the starboard squadron under the blue, and Herbert the rear squadron under the red. On 29 October the invasion fleet set sail from the naval fortress of Hellevoetsluis, but the expedition encountered early setbacks. A storm struck during the night of 30–31 October, scattering the fleet. Although no ships were lost, 800 cavalry horses died. After consultation, William III decided not to delay the mission, opting to proceed without waiting for new horses to be acquired. In the worst-case scenario, the cavalrymen would be mounted on smaller dragoon horses.

William embarking at Hellevoetsluis, by Everhardus Koster.

Although the delays might have given the English navy an opportunity to attack the Dutch fleet, and Dartmouth was under pressure from James II to do so, no such attempt was made. At the councils of war on 5 and 7 November, Dartmouth, cautious and lacking self-confidence, deferred to his subordinates. The majority of his subordinates were at least potentially disaffected with James, which may have influenced their advice. However, the naval historian J. D. Davies also notes that rejecting an expedition across the North Sea reflected what he calls "professional common sense," based on their experience during the Third Anglo-Dutch War. The stormy weather posed serious risks and threatened to drive the English fleet onto the Dutch coast, a lee shore, making any operation extremely hazardous.

=== 'The Protestant Wind' ===
On 11 November, the fleet set sail for the second time. It was only decided where to land at the last moment. Herbert consistently advocated for a landing in the south-west, where the most favourable harbours were located, but William III and his advisers had a low opinion of him and decided to make for the north-east of England. They opted to steer the fleet toward the north-east because of the influence wielded in that region by four key signatories of the invitation to William: Danby in Yorkshire, Lord Devonshire in Derbyshire, and Nottingham and Lumley in Durham. While William wanted to avoid the south-east of England where James II forces were centred, he did not want to land too far from London. During the night of 12–13 November, William changed his mind and set course for the south-west. Several reasons have been suggested for this decision. He may have judged the winds too strong to allow for a safe landing in the north, or perhaps he wanted to avoid the reinforcements James was sending in that direction. In any case, the weather continued to play a decisive role. Earlier storms had kept the Dutch fleet confined to harbour, but the situation was now reversed. The same east wind that carried William westward held the English fleet in the mouth of the Thames, unable to sail.

At dawn on 13 November, the Dutch fleet came within sight of the English fleet, which remained trapped by contrary winds. Dartmouth, whose fleet lay at anchor at the Gunfleet off the Essex coast, had earlier considered moving to The Downs off Kent, from where he might have intercepted the Dutch. Instead, the Dutch fleet passed within cannon range of The Downs unopposed and continued into the English Channel. Watching it sail past while only a few frigates were able to give chase, Dartmouth described himself as "the most unfortunate man living". The Dutch, in turn, could see the English fleet as they passed. Pursuing English frigates captured two transport vessels that had become separated from the main fleet, but were unable to interfere with the rest of the invasion force.

The Dutch fleet disembarking the troops at Torbay.

On the same day the fleet sailed unopposed through the Strait of Dover. The shores on both sides were lined with spectators, eager to witness the unprecedented spectacle. As evening fell, the fleet reached the Isle of Wight, which it passed during the night. William initially intended to land at Torbay or Dartmouth on the following day, 14 November, which coincided with both his 38th birthday and his wedding anniversary. He believed these events would boost the morale of his troops. However, some of his English advisors argued that the landing should take place on 15 November, the anniversary of the discovery of the Gunpowder Plot, and William agreed.

During the night of 14–15 November, strong easterly winds or a navigational error caused the fleet to overshoot the intended landing sites. By morning, Torbay and Dartmouth lay far behind. Returning was impossible due to the wind, and other nearby ports were either unsuitable or held by troops of James. This caused considerable alarm, since some feared the expedition was now at risk. There was concern that the English fleet, thus far held back by adverse winds, might now catch up. However, a shift in the wind soon brought unexpected relief, allowing William to proceed.

By mid-morning on 15 November, the wind had shifted to the south, allowing the Dutch fleet to enter Torbay within four hours. The landing began immediately. While the Dutch warships anchored across the entrance to the bay to protect the landing, Count Solms, together with a dozen men of the Dutch Guards, were the first to plant their boots on English soil. Some sixty boats were deployed for disembarkation, and the Dutch Guards were swiftly followed by the rest of the troops. William himself disembarked shortly after his troops.

William and his troops at the village of Brixham. The Dutch horse and foot guards are depicted on the foreground.

Meanwhile, the English fleet under Admiral Dartmouth, which had set sail in pursuit on 14 November, had reached the South Sand Head during the night and made all preparations for battle. However, strong and erratic winds frustrated the chase. A council of war held aboard Dartmouth's flagship concluded that any attempt to intercept the Dutch fleet was now futile. The Dutch transports were already emptying, and the English fleet was still short of several capital ships, fireships, and small craft that had failed to rejoin the main force since leaving the Gunfleet anchorage. Dartmouth reported to the Admiralty and King James that, although his officers were willing to risk battle, they unanimously advised against attacking unless it could prevent the landing itself. He also expressed concern that engaging a superior fleet without adequate reinforcements could lead to the destruction of the English navy's best ships and a potentially catastrophic defeat. As a result, Dartmouth resolved to remain near the Isle of Wight and await further instructions from London, while sending scouts westward to monitor the Dutch position.

Dartmouth believed that if he caught the Dutch fleet after they had landed their troops and supplies in sheltered harbours like Stokes Bay or Southampton Water, they would be more vulnerable than if intercepted at sea. However, he also recognized that a defeat in such a politically sensitive moment could have severe consequences. This uncertainty led him to delay action and seek the King's guidance, while still keeping open the possibility of attacking if new intelligence made it feasible. Dartmouth planned to hold position until his scattered ships regrouped and scouts reported back.

On 16 November, Dartmouth tried to approach the Dutch fleet, but a storm the next morning forced him to give up. Some of his ships, including the flagship, were damaged, so he brought the fleet into The Downs to take shelter. There, he took up a defensive position. He explained the setbacks to James and said he was waiting for reinforcements. To strengthen his position, he meanwhile ordered local ships to be turned into fireships using his own crews, which would be faster than relying on the navy yards. Although he didn't openly admit that his fleet was weaker, he clearly hoped for better conditions, especially an easterly wind, before taking action. Dartmouth finally approached Torbay on 30 November, but his scouts overestimated Dutch strength and reported the fleet in a strong defensive position. Faced with contrary winds and the prospect fighting a superior enemy with an increasingly unreliable crew, he withdrew towards Portsmouth, were he would remain until his surrender.

== Land campaign ==
=== Dutch and English strategy ===
William holding a council of war in a fisherman’s cottage following landing at Torbay

William's army landed in England late in the year, when the weather was far from ideal for military operations. There was little to no forage for horses, roads were virtually impassable due to mud, and soldiers had to camp in leaky tents in near-freezing temperatures. Under normal circumstances, seventeenth-century armies would have gone into winter quarters, and neither the Dutch nor the English forces could function at full capacity. However, the Dutch had prepared for such a campaign and their more experienced troops were better prepared for such conditions. The advantage this gave them was limited, but the Dutch benefited in another way: the difficult marching conditions had forced James to spread his army more thinly across the country, because he could not predict where the landing would take place.

English planners had been in considerable confusion about William's intentions. Reports from the Dutch Republic suggested that his army might land anywhere from the Scottish border to Land's End. Although this effectively ruled out the entire west coast, major posts such as Chester and Carlisle still had to be garrisoned. In the north, the fortresses of Berwick, Hull, and York required protection, while on the Thames and around London, Landguard Fort, Sheerness, Tilbury, Gravesend, and the Medway towns had to be manned – both to secure the capital and to prevent a repeat of the Dutch Raid on the Medway in 1667. Control of the south coast rested on key ports like Dover, the Isle of Wight, Portsmouth, and Plymouth. In addition to maintaining all these positions, James was deeply concerned about potential unrest in London. To pre-empt any uprising, he stationed a substantial force within the city. A mobile field army was to be assembled within a 25-mile (40-kilometre) radius of the capital, ready to march in whichever direction William's army might land.

William entering Exeter

Once it became clear that William intended to land in the south-west, James decided to concentrate his field army on Salisbury Plain. A forced march to surprise and overwhelm William's exhausted troops was impossible due to the weather conditions. However, Salisbury's central location blocked William's path to London, offered the Royal army strategic flexibility, while the wide, open plain allowed James to make full use of his superiority in cavalry.

After landing near Brixham, William's troops marched toward Exeter, the nearest major town. Following a difficult journey through rough and isolated terrain, they reached the city on 19 November. The reception was mixed: the local population lined the roads, clapping and cheering, but there was no sign of a widespread uprising against James II. The nobility and urban elite remained cautious, and the city's magistrates had fled. The lukewarm response of the local elite caused concern among the Dutch and deeply unsettled William. His English contacts had painted a very different picture of the situation. In Exeter, William rested his troops, prepared for the long and difficult march to London and hoped to see the first defections take place. He bought up all the available horses in the area to replace those lost earlier and established a supply line to support the advance. The Dutch remained in Exeter for 12 days.

=== James's retreat ===
Meanwhile, James and Feversham made his final preparations to confront William at Salisbury. Morale in James's army was low. On 22 November, the first defector, Captain Charles Burrington, had reached William's camp. The following day, several junior officers also rode into Exeter to switch sides. The real blow, however, came the same day with the defection of Lord Cornbury, commander of the Royal Dragoons and son of the staunch royalist Earl of Clarendon. Cornbury, along with Thomas Langston, had been sent to attack Dutch outposts near Honiton. Instead, they attempted to defect, bringing three cavalry regiments with them. When the troops realised what was happening, most managed to escape and returned to James's army.

The conspiracy within the army was too weak to overcome the loyalty of the vast majority of officers and soldiers. Only a few hundred troops joined the defecting officers, and many of them had been misled. Yet although the number of actual defections may have been disappointingly small from William's perspective, their impact on James's morale and the spirit of his army was far greater than the numbers suggested. Mentally unprepared for the Dutch invasion, unsure of his own strategy, and beset by rumours of further desertions, James finally reached his army on 29 November. Many of his troops were still straggling down the road from London, slowed by ice and mud. In poor physical condition, a significant portion of his army failed to reach Salisbury, and his field force probably numbered no more than 19,000 men.

Feversham had little idea of William's whereabouts, whether the Dutch were still at Exeter or already advancing eastwards, or which route they might take. More importantly, he remained uncertain about the size of William's army. He was unable to obtain reliable intelligence because he was reluctant to send out scouting parties, fearing that they might defect. The reports that did reach him greatly exaggerated Dutch strength, with some estimating William's army at between 25,000 and 30,000 men. Following the Wincanton Skirmish on 30 November, James and his commanders mistakenly believed that the Dutch were rapidly approaching Salisbury, when in fact William had not yet left Exeter. Advancing without reliable information appeared too risky, while remaining at Salisbury was equally unattractive, as the city was difficult to defend and provisions were limited.

Meanwhile, the English army was increasingly affected by mutual suspicion among its officers and men, further undermining its cohesion. James might still have rallied morale by appealing to national resentment against the Dutch and the humiliation of invasion, but he was mentally and physically exhausted. He suffered nosebleeds and appeared deeply depressed. On 3 December, a council of war persuaded him to retreat toward London. The retreat proved disastrous. By falling back on London, James effectively ceded control of the rest of England to William, while his own army was left with little room to manoeuvre and risked being trapped between the Dutch army and fleet. Once James chose not to attack, he handed the strategic initiative to William. Military historian John Childs argues that once James abandoned the prospect of attacking William and withdrew towards London, the campaign effectively ceased to be a serious military contest.

The retreat seemed to many like an admission of defeat and thus marked the beginning of major defections. On the night of 3 December, Churchill, the Duke of Grafton, and Lord Berkeley deserted to William. Their example was quickly followed by other senior nobles, and with their departure the command structure of James's army collapsed entirely. Meanwhile, the elite in the Dutch-occupied counties began shifting their loyalties toward William. In Dorset, leading gentlemen organised both the militia and the collection of taxes in his name. Elsewhere in the country, Williamite supporters secured control over Lancashire, Cheshire, York, and Nottingham.

=== William's march and James's flight ===
Key locations in November 1688

At Exeter, William's position was threatened from the rear by the fortress of Plymouth, which remained in royal hands and was garrisoned by 1,000 troops under the Earl of Bath. However, Bath made no serious move against William, and by 26 November the fortress had been effectively isolated by Dutch cavalry patrols in the surrounding countryside. On 1 December, news reached William that Bath had declared for him, removing the threat and allowing William to begin his march on London.

William recognised that James's retreat had handed him control of the situation. He refused to negotiate and firmly declined a personal meeting with James. Such a meeting would have suited the Tories, who sought a compromise between the two men in order to protect their own political interests. William was determined to shape events on his own terms. He understood that James's authority had collapsed after his return from Salisbury and that he himself now held the initiative in English politics. It was not until 18 December, while camped at Hungerford, that William agreed to meet James's commissioners. His demands were not particularly severe. He accepted the summoning of a free Parliament but insisted on the immediate dismissal of all Catholic officials. He also demanded that the English government finance his army. These terms, while humiliating, did not necessarily strip James of his crown or render him powerless. Only the continued presence of William's army could enforce any limits on royal authority, and that presence could not last indefinitely.

William was not entirely free in his actions. He could not publicly state that his primary motive for intervention was to secure English support in his ongoing war against France. This objective had been deliberately omitted from his Declaration to avoid alienating English public opinion. However, after Louis XIV declared war on the Dutch Republic on 26 November, English assistance became more urgent than ever. James admitted that the conditions offered to him were more favourable than he had expected. Nonetheless, he was unwilling to remain king under these circumstances and feared that he might meet the same fate as his father in 1649. After the Queen and the Prince of Wales fled to France on the night of 9 December, James followed them into exile the next day.

The flight of the King transformed the political landscape. Until that moment William III had acted with caution and had refrained from openly challenging James's position. However, James's departure presented William with the opportunity to claim the English crown for himself. He was confident that a freely elected Parliament would offer him the throne. William was fully aware that his intervention had been decisive and that he was now an essential figure in any settlement concerning the succession. According to Clarendon, who met the Prince on 22 December, William appeared cheerful and made no attempt to hide his satisfaction at the King's departure. However, James was captured and brought back to London on the 26th, where despite everything he was still cheered by the crowd. Meanwhile, William advanced steadily towards London. Patrick Sarsfield with 600 Irish troops attempted to defend the bridge over the Thames near Reading, but a frontal assault by 280 Dutch cavalrymen successfully dislodged them. Besides the Wincanton Skirmish it would be the only armed clash of the campaign.

=== Entry into London ===
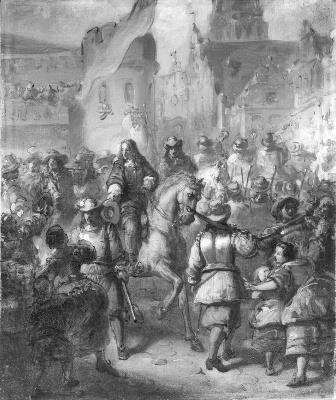
William's entry into London

William's army reached Henley-on-Thames by 24 December and arrived at Windsor three days later. On 27 December Solms, leading three battalions of Dutch infantry and a force of cavalry, was sent to secure London for William. His troops entered the city around 10 p.m. and swiftly took control of the posts at St James's Palace before marching in battle formation with lit matches towards Whitehall Palace. King James was going to bed around 11 p.m. when he learned that Dutch troops were already in St James's Park. Solms demanded entry for his troops into Whitehall Palace but James refused. After a tense exchange James realised he had little choice and ordered the foot guards regiment then on duty at the palace, the Coldstream Regiment of Foot Guards, to leave the area. Colonel Lord Craven, the commander of the Coldstream Guards, was offered a peaceful retirement by Solms but refused and declared he would rather be cut to pieces than surrender his posts to the Dutch. Despite Craven's resistance James urged him to surrender and the Coldstream Guards eventually withdrew, allowing Dutch troops to occupy the palace.

On 28 December William entered London while James left for Rochester against his will. William's arrival was carefully choreographed; William wore elaborate white clothing and his Dutch Guards lined a two-mile route through streets packed with cheering crowds, many of whom were dressed in orange. Despite this reception William, who personally disliked crowds, was displeased at being treated as a conquering hero, hoping that the English public would see the events of the past weeks as something they had naturally engineered through their own free will. At the first opportunity he turned off the main road and made his way to St James's Palace, leaving behind disappointed crowds.

== Aftermath ==
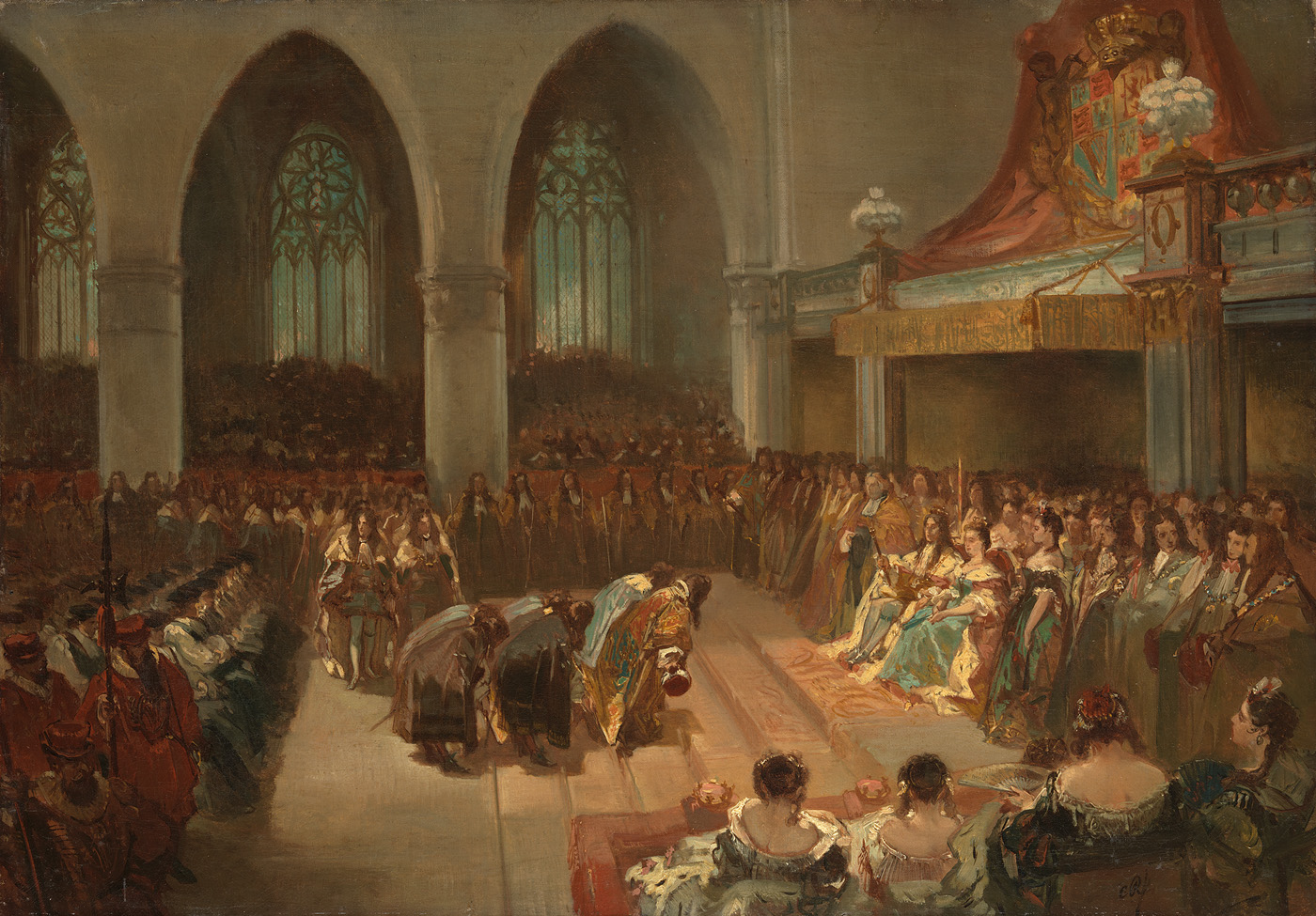
William and Mary being crowned at Westminster Abbey on 11 April 1689

Following their entry into London, William's Dutch Guards quartered in Whitehall, St James's Palace and Somerset House. At the same time, the English and Scottish regiments in Dutch service were quartered in Southwark, along the southern bank of the River Thames. Most of the remaining Dutch troops were quartered in settlements around the capital. The English regiments were ordered to withdraw twenty miles from London and were subsequently dispersed across the country. A Convention Parliament was summoned to determine the constitutional settlement. After William made clear that he would accept only an arrangement in which he became king, Parliament offered the crown jointly to him and Mary in February 1689. The pair were crowned on 11 April at Westminster Abbey.

William subsequently ordered several of James II's former regiments to serve in the Low Countries, both to reinforce the war against France and to remove potentially unreliable or rebellious troops from England. Despite the removal of suspect officers, sympathies for James remained widespread among soldiers. Morale had also suffered from the army's humiliating role during the invasion: it had offered little resistance, been expelled from London, and dispersed throughout the country. The Guards regiments were particularly resentful that their traditional duties at Whitehall and Westminster had been taken over by the Dutch Guards, and many British soldiers were unwilling to serve under Dutch officers.

Contemporary observers reported open hostility towards William, while English politicians feared that the former troops of James II might provide a source of support for a Jacobite rising or a Franco-Irish invasion. In March 1689 the Royal Regiment of Foot staged a mutiny at Ipswich, which was suppressed by Dutch troops under Godard van Reede-Ginkel. Although several Dutch regiments later fought in Ireland or returned to the Republic, William maintained a substantial Dutch military presence in England throughout the Nine Years' War. The final units of the Dutch Guards left England in 1698.

== Sources ==
- Van der Aa, Abraham Jacob (1874). "Frederik Herman von Schomberg". Biographisch woordenboek der Nederlanden. Deel 17.
- Bander, James (2014). Dutch Warships in the Age of Sail 1600-1714: Design, Construction, Careers. Seaforth. ISBN 9781848321571.
- Alphen, G. van (1938). De stemming van de Engelschen tegen de Hollanders in Engeland: tijdens de regeering van den Koning-Stadhouder Willem III, 1688-1702. Van Gorcum.
- Bosman, Machiel (2016). De roofkoning: prins Willem III en de invasie van Engeland (The robber king: Prince William III and the invasion of England). Athenaeum-Polak & Van Gennep.
- Chandler, David (1995). The art of warfare in the age of Marlborough. Sarpedon. ISBN 978-1885119148.
- Childs, John (1980). The Army, James II, and the Glorious Revolution. Manchester University Press. ISBN 978-0-7190-0688-3.
- Childs, John (1987). The British army of William III: 1698-1702. Manchester University Press. ISBN 9780719089961.
- Davies, J. D. (2008). Pepys's Navy Ships, Men and Warfare 1649-89. Seaforth Publishing.
- Davies, J. D. (2017). Kings of the Sea: Charles II, James II and the Royal Navy. Seaforth Publishing.
- Davies, J. D. (1989). "James II, William of Orange and the admirals". In Cruickshanks, Eveline (ed.). By force or default? The revolution of 1688–1689. John Donald. ISBN 978-0-85976-279-3.
- Deen, Femke; Onnekink, David; Reinders, Michiel (2011). Pamphlets and Politics in the Dutch Republic. Brill.
- Hemingway, James Peter. 2002. The work of the surveyors of the Navy during the period of the establishments : a comparative study of naval architecture between 1672 and 1755. PhD Thesis. University of Bristol
- Hoak, Dale (1996). Hoak, Dale; Feingold, Mordechai (eds.). The Anglo-Dutch revolution of 1688–89 in 'The World of William and Mary: Anglo-Dutch Perspectives on the Revolution of 1688–89'. Stanford University Press. ISBN 978-0-8047-2406-7.
- Israel, Jonathan (1995). The Dutch Republic: Its Rise, Greatness, and Fall 1477–1806. Oxford: Clarendon Press. ISBN 0-19-873072-1.
- Israel, Jonathan I (2003). The Anglo-Dutch Moment: Essays on the Glorious Revolution and its World Impact. Cambridge University Press. ISBN 978-0521544061.
- Jardine, Lisa (2008). Going Dutch: How England Plundered Holland's Glory. Harper. ISBN 978-0-00-719734-7.
- Jones, J.R. (1993). Marlborough. Cambridge University Press. ISBN 0-521-37593-2.
- Jonge, Johannes Cornelis de (1860). Geschiedenis van het Nederlandsche zeewezen Deel 3 (PDF) (in Dutch). A.C. Kruseman.
- Knoop, Jan Willem (1881). "1688 en 1689". De Gids (45): 1–44.
- Nimwegen, Olaf van (2020). De Veertigjarige Oorlog 1672–1712: de strijd van de Nederlanders tegen de Zonnekoning [The Forty Years' War 1672–1712: the Dutch struggle against the Sun King] (in Dutch). Prometheus. ISBN 978-90-446-3871-4.
- Nolan, Cathal (2008). Wars of the Age of Louis XIV, 1650–1715: An Encyclopedia of Global Warfare and Civilization. Greenwood. ISBN 978-0313330469.
- Powley, Edward (1928). The English Navy in the Revolution of 1688. Cambridge University Press.
- Prud'homme van Reine, Ronald (2009). Opkomst en Ondergang van Nederlands Gouden Vloot – Door de ogen van de zeeschilders Willem van de Velde de Oude en de Jonge. De Arbeiderspers. ISBN 978-90-295-6696-4.
- Rodger, Nicholas Andrew Martin (2004). The Command of the Ocean, 1649–1815. A Naval History of Britain, Volume 2. Allen Lane. ISBN 978-0141026909.
- Shearwood, Mark (2026). The Williamite Invasion of 1688: The Last Successful Invasion of England. Helion & Company.
- Stapleton, John. M (2003). Forging a Coalition Army: William III, the Grand Alliance, and the Confederate Army in the Spanish Netherlands, 1688–1697. Ohio State University.
- Troost, Wouter (2005). William III the Stadholder-king: A Political Biography. Routledge. ISBN 978-0754650713.
- der Weduwen, Arthur (2026). The Last Invasion of England: 1688 and the Dutch Armada. Princeton University Press. ISBN 9780691263441.
- Western, John R. (1972). Monarchy and Revolution. The English State in the 1680s. Blandford Press. ISBN 978-0-7137-3280-1.
