= Tender (Lady Maisery album) =

Studio album by Lady Maisery
- Released: 11 November 2022
- Genre: Folk
- Length: 50:46
- Label: Lady Maisery Records

Tender is the fifth studio album by the English folk trio Lady Maisery, released 11 November 2022. It was their first studio album released in six years.

The album comprises original songs written by Lady Maisery, as well as interpretations of works by Björk, Tracy Chapman, and Lal Waterson. The songs include arrangements of electric guitar, percussion, harp, harmonium, banjo, accordion, viola, and organ bearing voices that unite in strength, harmony and message.

Tender is an examination of female experience from many sides.

Tender was recorded in Sheffield in collaboration with producer Adam Pietrykowski. In both sound and song, it is a radically different record to any Lady Maisery had made before.

== Reviews ==
Thomas Blake, writing for Folk Radio UK, indicated that Tender includes Lady Maisery's "strongest collection of songs yet" and that the band "instantly re-established themselves at the forefront of British folk music". Similarly, Get Ready to Rock wrote that, with this album, the band "confirmed their place as one of the most thought provoking, musically harmonious and entertaining bands currently out there".

The Times called Tender "a beguiling blend of ancient and modern", while Get Ready to Rock referred to it as "a thing of musical wonder and beauty". Dai Jeffries from Folking.com said the album is "passionate", "forceful", and "full of powerful messages".

The Observer's Neil Spencer said the album was "well worth the wait" while referring to is as "a thoughtful record whose moments of bleakness are softened by the trio’s lush harmonies".

Illiam Sebitz, writing for the 5 Five Review, highlighted how the album "effortlessly flow[s] between original compositions that draw on a myriad of musical influences", noting that "Lady Maisery is skillful voyagers’ music based on English folk songs but speaks to anyone who takes the time to listen."

== Track listing ==
No.	Title	Writer(s)	Length
1.	"tender"	Rowan Rheingans	4.46
2.	"bird i do not know"	Hazel Askew	3:33
3.	"echoes"	Hannah James	4:50
4.	"3000 miles"	Tracy Chapman arr. Lady Maisery	6:36
5.	"hyperballad"	Björk arr. Lady Maisery	3:29
6.	"scientist"	Hazel Askew	4:15
7.	"rest now"	Rowan Rheingans	4:42
8.	"the fall"	Hazel Askew	5:07
9.	"child among the weeds"	Lal Waterson arr. Lady Maisery	2:46
10.	"noughts and crosses"	Hannah James	4:54
11.	"birdsong"	Hazel Askew	5:48
Total length:			50:46

== Personnel ==
- Hazel Askew (vocals, harp, melodeon, harmonium, 5-string banjo)
- Hannah James (vocals, piano accordion, sansula, percussion)
- Rowan Rheingans (vocals, fiddle, banjo, 5-string banjo, electric guitar)

with,

- Adam Pietrykowski, organ
- Toby Kuhn, additional percussion

=== Additional credits ===
- Produced by Adam Pietrykowski and Lady Maisery
- Recorded and mixed by Adam Pietrykowski
- Additional sound engineering by Tom Wright
- Recorded at Tesla Studios and Yellow Arch Studios, Sheffield;
- Mastered by Minerva Pappi
- Photography, artwork and design by Somhairle MacDonald

== Charts ==
Chart performance for Tender
Chart (2022)	Peak position
UK Album Downloads (Official Charts)	48
UK Folk Albums (Official Charts)	3
UK Independent Albums (Official Charts)	18
