= Battle of Reading (1688) =

1688 engagement of the Glorious Revolution

Coordinates: 51.4557°N 0.9733°W

- Part of the 1688 invasion of England and Glorious Revolution
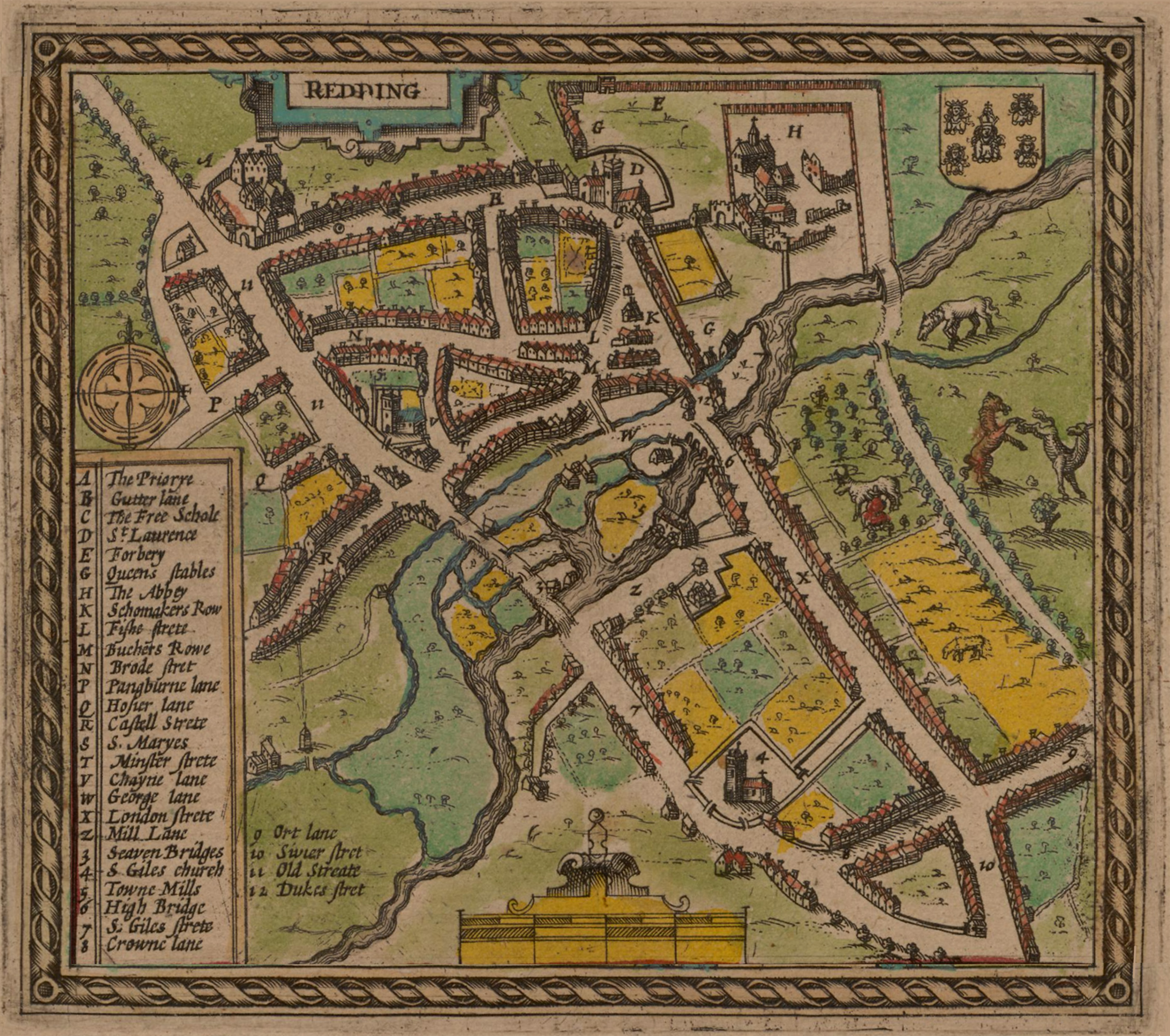
- A 1611 map of Reading, with Broad Street marked with an "N" on the map's upper left
Date	9 December 1688
Location	Reading, Berkshire
Result	Anglo-Dutch victory

Belligerents
Dutch Republic; English Williamites	Ireland

Commanders and leaders
(Dutch Republic) Hans Bentinck	(Kingdom of Ireland) Patrick Sarsfield

Strength
280	600

Casualties and losses
2+ killed	6–50 killed

The battle of Reading (also known as the battle of Broad Street, Reading Skirmish or Reading Fight) took place on 9 December 1688 in Reading, Berkshire during the 1688 invasion of England. Dutch States Army dragoons, led by Hans Bentinck and supported by Williamite civilians, routed an Irish Army detachment under Patrick Sarsfield from the town in one of only two substantial battles fought in England during the Glorious Revolution. The engagement was celebrated in Reading for many years afterwards.

== Background ==
On 5 November 1688, (Note: All dates in this article use the Julian calendar, which was the preferred calendar of 1688 England; it was ten days behind the Gregorian calendar used in Continental Europe and in the modern-day United Kingdom.) William of Orange, the stadtholder of the Dutch Republic, landed in Torbay, Devon at the head of a Williamite army to overthrow the unpopular James II of England. Five weeks later, on 7 December, William reached Hungerford, where numerous English Williamites came to visit him, including several hundred cavalrymen under the command of Williamite noblemen from Northern England.

After retreating from Salisbury, James' main army was stationed on Hounslow Heath. On 8 December, James sent Lord Halifax, Lord Nottingham and Lord Godolphin to confer with William. Halifax presented James' proposals, which included agreeing that their points of dispute would be laid before the Parliament of England, and while Parliament deliberated William's army would not come closer than 30 miles from London. Halifax then handed a personal letter from James to William, who conferred with his English advisors to discuss the proposals. Chaired by Lord Oxford, after a long debate the advisors informed William he should reject James' proposals. William decided to negotiate and put forth several counter-proposals for Halifax to deliver to James.

== Battle ==
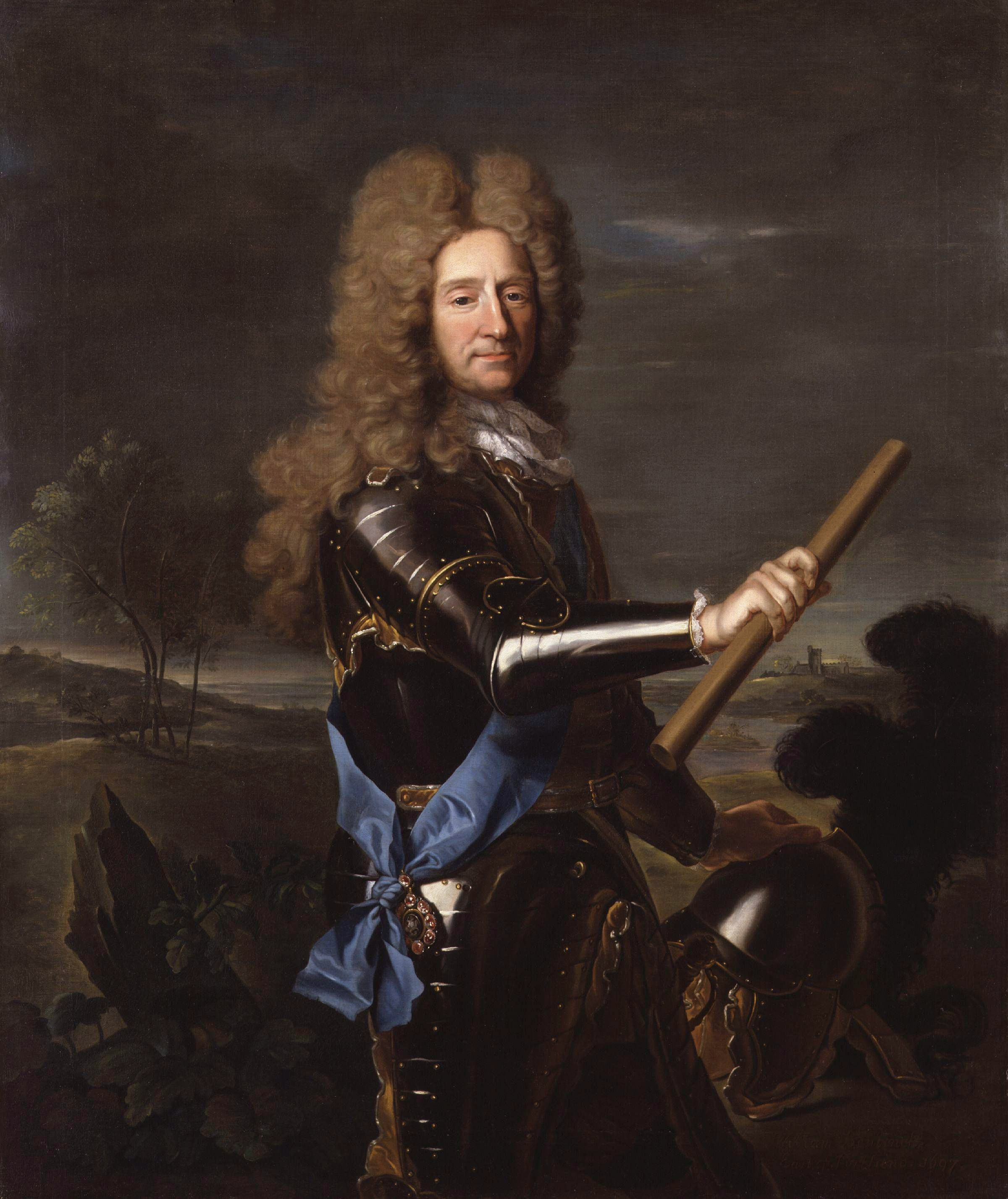
Hans Bentinck, the commander of the Dutch troops in the battle

James had posted an advance guard of 600 Irish Army troops under Patrick Sarsfield in Reading, Berkshire to stop the march of William's army towards London. As wild rumours, known as the Irish Fright, asserted that Sarsfield's men were planning to massacre the residents of Reading, they sent word to William requesting help.

On 9 December, a relief force of 280 Dutch States Army dragoons under Hans Bentinck were sent to Reading. Warned of the Irish army's positions, the Dutch attacked them from an unexpected direction, making their way into the town centre via Broad Street. Local civilians supported the attackers by firing at Sarsfield's troops from their windows. The Irish retreated in confusion, leaving an unknown number of dead behind, with reports varying widely from six to fifty killed, depending on the account. Bentinck's dragoons suffered at least two men killed. Many of the battle's casualties were buried in the churchyard of St Giles' Church.

The battle was described with blatant Williamite bias by English writer Daniel Defoe in his three-volume work A Tour thro' the Whole Island of Great Britain, which was one of the battle's few contemporary accounts. Defoe, who had supported and possibly fought in the Monmouth Rebellion against James II, was a supporter of William's invasion. He described how a squadron of "Irish dragoons" was routed by the "irresistible fury" of a Dutch force who chased many of the fleeing Irishmen to nearby village of Twyford.

== Aftermath ==
James was already convinced that only Irish troops could be relied on to defend him, but their defeat by an inferior force and the willingness of the people of Reading to support Dutch invaders against his army underlined his insecurity. On 11 December, James fled London in an attempt to escape capture. He eventually escaped to France, where he met with his ally Louis XIV before landing in Ireland, where most of the population supported him. James' last hopes of regaining his throne were dashed by his defeat in the Williamite War in Ireland.

In light of proposals he had received from James while in Hungerford, William decided not to immediately proceed to London, but to accept an invitation from the University of Oxford. On 11 December, William set off for Abingdon-on-Thames, but on hearing of James's flight from England, he turned and headed down the Thames valley through Wallingford and Henley-on-Thames. He accepted the surrender of James' troops he met on the way, arriving at Windsor on 14 December 1688.

== Bibliography ==
- Childs, W.M. (2003) [1905], "The Story of the Town of Reading", in Ford, David Nash (ed.), The Battle of Broad Street, Nash Ford Publishing, archived from the original on 26 September 2008
- Ford, David Nash (2001), "Reading", History of Reading in the Royal County of Berkshire, Nash Ford Publishing, archived from the original on 22 January 2011
- Information Services, William of Orange's Itinerary, University of Nottingham
- Pihlens, Hugh. "William of Orange at the Bear". Hungerford Historical Association. Archived from the original on 26 July 2013.
- Thorne, James (1847). Rambles by rivers: The Thames. Vol. 1, 2. C. Cox.
