= Weave and Spin =

Weave & Spin

Studio album by Lady Maisery
- Released: 22 August 2011
- Genre: Folk
- Length: 39:48
- Label: RootBeat Records

Weave and Spin is the first album by folk trio Lady Maisery

== Review ==
Lady Maisery, best known for creating a stunning vocal harmony by way of their songs and ballads, won the nomination for the "Horizon" BBC Radio 2 Folk Award 2012 along with the "Best Debut" at the Spiral Awards 2012. It was the trio's 2011 debut album, "Weave and Spin" that launched them with a considerable feedback inviting favorable reviews from the daily, The Independent, which rated it as an "Album of the Week". Lady Maisery are successful in reviving the almost forgotten "diddling or tune singing" so native to English music, which is still practiced in Scandinavia and Europe. The trio's talent always shines both when singing unaccompanied or with music to back them played brilliantly by them on accordion, harp, fiddle, and bansitar.

== Track listing ==
No.	Title	Writer(s)	Length
1.	"I Know My Love"	Traditional	3:26
2.	"Minoorne Labajalg/Elin's Trall"	Traditional/Elin Lyth	3:19
3.	"Portland Town"	Derroll Adams	2:41
4.	"The Changeling's Lullaby"	Words: Gavin Davenport, Tune: Jess Arrowsmith	4:42
5.	"Nottamun Fair"	Traditional	4:38
6.	"My Boy Jack"	Words: Rudyard Kipling, Tune: Peter Bellamy	1:52
7.	"The Colour of Amber"	Traditional	4:08
8.	"The Capable Wife"	Traditional	1:58
9.	"The Gardener"	Traditional	4:27
10.	"Har du Sett/Lads and Lasses"	Traditional	4:04
11.	"Mary Ann"	Traditional	2:46
12.	"Willie's Lady"	Traditional/Hazel Askew	7:19
13.	"Primrose Polka/Bluebell Polka"	Traditional	4:05
14.	"Sleep on Beloved"	Traditional/Sarah Doudney and Ira D. Sankey	3:16
Total length:			52:37

== Personnel ==
- Hazel Askew (vocals, harp)
- Hannah James (vocals, piano accordion, clogs)
- Rowan Rheingans (vocals, fiddle, banjo, bansitar).
