= Songs of Separation =

Anglo-Scottish music project

- From L to R: Karine Polwart, Rowan Rheingans, Kate Young, Hannah Read, Eliza Carthy, Jenny Hill, Jenn Butterworth, Hannah James, Hazel Askew, Mary Macmaster

Background information
- Origin: United Kingdom
- Genres: Folk
- Years active: 2015 – 2016
- Label: Navigator Records
- Past members: Eliza Carthy; Hannah James; Hannah Read; Hazel Askew; Jenn Butterworth; Jenny Hill; Karine Polwart; Kate Young; Mary Macmaster; Rowan Rheingans
- Website: songsofseparation.co.uk

Songs of Separation was a music project created in the aftermath of the 2014 Scottish independence referendum to explore through the medium of music ideas of separation. It was organised by double-bass player Jenny Hill and brought together ten female folk musicians from Scotland and England for one week in June 2015 on the Isle of Eigg. The resulting album won the "Best Album" category in the 2017 BBC Radio 2 Folk Awards.

== Project ==
The idea for Songs of Separation came when double bass player and composer Jenny Hill was living on the Isle of Eigg, one of the four Small Isles of the Inner Hebrides, off the west coast of Scotland. Travelling a lot between her home in Eigg and her work in England, Hill reflected on the different ways that the issues around Scottish independence were presented and received in the two countries. She felt that the adversarial approach caused people to forget the bigger issues that affect everyone. She was also concerned that folk music was less concerned with current affairs and social commentary than it had been in earlier decades.

She decided to create a music project comprising Scottish and English musicians to explore the concept of separation. Her ethos was to treat the musicians fairly and to find the resources to pay them properly. A former charity director, Hill set about securing sponsorship, and gained support from Creative Scotland, Arts Council England and Enterprise Music Scotland.

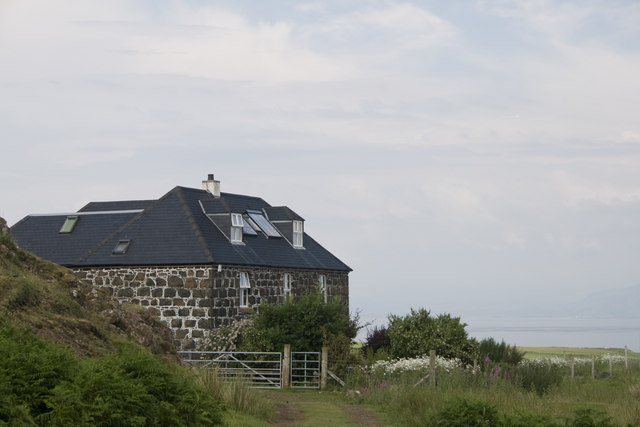
The Glebe Barn, location of the project on Eigg.

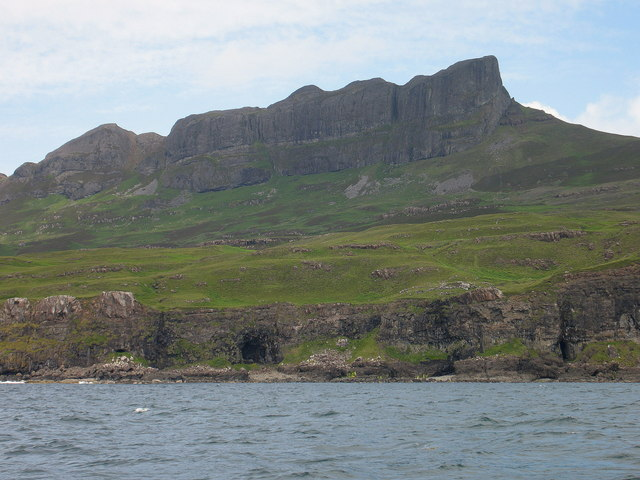
The Cathedral Cave, location of some live recordings.

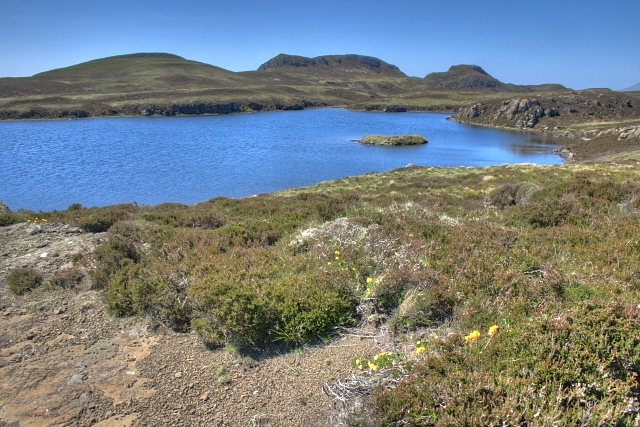
Loch nam Ban Mòra (Lake of the Big Women).

Hill selected a dream team of ten musicians, five from Scotland and five from England, some of the most well-known musicians in the genre including Karine Polwart and Eliza Carthy, some earlier in their careers, and was able to secure the entire list. They came together on Eigg in June 2015, with three days to create the arrangements and three days for recording. The only prerequisite was for each of the musicians to arrive with three songs from her own tradition exploring the theme of separation in any way she chose. They stayed together in the island's Glebe Barn hostel, and recorded in the Eigg Studio. Eigg film-maker Ben Cormack of Picarus created short films of each day's activities. Andy Bell of Hudson Records, Sheffield was the recording engineer on Eigg, and co-produced the album with Hill.

The music reflects its creation on the Isle of Eigg, with its turbulent history. The two a capella tracks were recorded in the island's Cathedral Cave, used for secret Roman Catholic services during the 18th century, which can only be accessed at low tide. Rowan Rheingans' song Soil and Soul was influenced by the island's legend of the Big Women and a visit to the Loch nam Ban Mora (Lake of the Big Women).

The first two tracks of the Songs of Separation album, "Echo Mocks the Corncrake" / "It Was A' for Our Rightfu' King" were released as a digital single on 20 November 2015, followed by the full album in January 2016. The album release was accompanied by a film The Making of Songs of Separation.

== Musicians ==
Eliza Carthy	fiddle, Indian harmonium, percussion and vocal
Hannah James	percussion, piano accordion and vocal
Hannah Read	fiddle, guitar (track 2) and vocal
Hazel Askew	flute, harp, melodeon and vocal
Jenn Butterworth	guitar and vocal
Jenny Hill	double bass and vocal
Karine Polwart	Indian harmonium, percussion, tenor guitar and vocal
Kate Young	fiddle and vocal
Mary Macmaster	clarsach, wire harp and vocal
Rowan Rheingans	banjo, fiddle, percussion, viola and vocal

Sources:.

== Album ==
Songs of Separation

Studio album by Songs of Separation
- Released: 29 January 2016
- Recorded: Isle of Eigg, June 2015
- Genre: Folk
- Length: 55:56
- Language: English, Scottish Gaelic, Norn
- Label: Navigator Records
- Producer: Jenny Hill; Andy Bell

#	Title	Music	Lyrics	Lead vocal
1	Echo Mocks the Corncrake Eigg is one of the last refuges of the corncrake in Scotland.	trad.	trad. (Roud 2736)	Polwart
2	It Was A' for Our Rightfu' King A Jacobite song of exile.	Hannah Read	Robert Burns (Roud 5789)	Read
3	Poor Man's Lamentation A broadside found in the Vaughan Williams Memorial Library, yearning for equality and love.	Hannah James	Uriahs Smart	James
4	'S Trom an Direadh (Sad the Climbing) A Gaelic waulking song from Eigg. (Unaccompanied recording made on location in the Cathedral Cave on Eigg.)	trad.	trad.	Macmaster
5	'S Muladach mi 's mi air m' Aineoil (Sad Am I and in a Strange Place) A Gaelic waulking song about a woman left alone on an island.	trad.	trad.	Macmaster
5	Eiggy Bread	Kate Young	–	–
6	Cleaning the Stones A goldfish's love song.	Eliza Carthy	Eliza Carthy	Carthy
7	Unst Boat Song (Starka virna vestilie) The Unst Boat Song was collected in 1947 from John Stickle, of Unst. It is mainly in the Norn language, extinct since 1850, with some Shetland dialect. (Unaccompanied recording made on location in the Cathedral Cave on Eigg.)	trad.	trad.	Polwart
8	London Lights A music hall song about a woman with a baby born out of wedlock.	trad.	trad. (Roud 18815)	Askew
9	Sea King Based on a 19th century Danish poem about a woman who becomes a mermaid.	Kate Young	Adam Oehlenschläger and Kate Young	Young
10	Soil and Soul About human relationships to the land and to nature. The title is from the book of the same name by Alastair McIntosh.	Rowan Rheingans	Rowan Rheingans	Rheingans
11	Over the Border			
11	The Withering	Mary Macmaster	–	–
11	Flowers of the Forest A lament for war dead.	trad.	Jean Elliot and Frederic William Moorman (Roud 3812)	Carthy, Polwart
11	Blue Bonnets Over the Border	trad.	–	–
11	Hope Lies Over the Border	Hazel Askew, Karine Polwart, Rowan Rheingans		Polwart
12	The Road Less Travelled From the Robert Frost poem The Road Not Taken.	Rowan Rheingans	Karine Polwart, Rowan Rheingans, Kate Young	Rheingans

Credits:

- Conceived and managed by Jenny Hill
- Produced by Jenny Hill and Andy Bell
- Recorded by Andy Bell at Eigg Studio, Isle of Eigg
- Mixed by Andy Bell
- Mastered by Nick Cooke
- Photography by Greg Carr (landscape) and Ben Cormack (group photo)
- Isle of Eigg illustration by Thomas Leslie

== Reception ==
Professional ratings
Aggregate scores
Source	Rating
Metacritic	84/100
Review scores
Source	Rating
The Telegraph	4 /5 stars
The Guardian	4 /5 stars
Mojo	4 /5 stars
Uncut	4 /5 stars

The Songs of Separation album was the winner of the "best album" category in the 2017 BBC Radio 2 Folk Awards. This category was decided by a popular vote, so it was a significant achievement for a short-term project with a previously unknown name to win against four established performers in the genre. The album was also nominated for the "Best Album" category in the Scots Trad Music Awards 2016, and the track "Echo Mocks the Corncrake" for "Best Traditional Song" in the 2017 BBC Radio 2 Folk Awards.

The Daily Telegraph included the album in "The best folk music albums of 2016", saying "the harmonies are gorgeous and the lyrics thought-provoking". In The Guardian, Robin Denselow gave the album four stars and called it "a varied, thoughtful set that stays well clear of political sloganeering." Daniel Rosenberg of the Huffington Post described the album as "moving" and included it in his list of the forty best albums worldwide of 2016.

More detailed analysis was offered by the specialist titles. On Folk Radio UK, Helen Gregory's detailed review comments on the marginalisation of women's voices in politics and the particular contribution of each track to the project's theme, concluding that it is a "superlative and essential record". FATEA Magazine also has a detailed track-by-track analysis, and praises the "brazen and multifarious approach to separation", polished arrangements, and thorough research, calling the album "immensely successful".

Peer reviewers included musicians Ross Ainslie "ethereal and beguiling, yet terrifying and totally banging! ... this is an extraordinary album!", Norma Waterson "it is one of the most interesting pieces of music I have heard in a long time... puts me in mind of the Lewis Psalm singers but also those women singers of Russia and Georgia", Rachel Sermanni "This album is a work of wild beauty", Sarah Hayes "a stunning blend of voice, groove, nature and experience", and Maddy Prior "Created in three days and recorded in three days? F**king hell, you're all too clever by half".

In his musical review of 2016, Mike Harding said

One album that had a real major impact on me was Songs of Separation... It is just one of the most amazing albums. Some magic happened on that island when those women were together. The songs are beautifully produced, and there's just something really really 'right' about the album... I don't know how to explain it other than to say that the whole thing is a complete and utter delight.

== Live shows ==
Four live dates in Scotland and England took place in January 2016, including a concert during the Celtic Connections festival, which Colin Irwin described as "joyous, thought-provoking, passionate, stirring, charming and beauteous" and observed that "the empathetic chemistry here was genuine."

The BBC Radio Scotland programme Travelling Folk on 7 February 2016 included a live session from the collective and an interview conducted by Bruce MacGregor.

A grant from the PRS Foundation Beyond Borders fund enabled further live performances to take place later in 2016. Many of these concerts included community participation. At the Dumfries and Galloway Arts Festival the Cairn Chorus, a local community choir, collaborated with the project. In Edinburgh there was a singing workshop for children, who then joined with the band for some numbers on stage at the Queens Hall. At the Cambridge Folk Festival there was a workshop about the ideas behind the project. The performance at St David's Hall Cardiff as part of the Festival of Voice was billed as Beyond Borders: Songs of Separation and Songs of Unity. It incorporated new material in Welsh and Irish in addition to the original languages English, Scottish Gaelic and Norn. Guest musicians performing at this event were Karan Casey from Ireland, Georgia Ruth and Gwyneth Glyn from Wales and Julie Fowlis. The final concert was at Kings Place in London.

== Legacy ==
The Songs of Separation project did not explicitly draw attention to being all women, but it was often remarked on by others. For example Jenny Hill recalled a journalist asking them why the participants were all women, and Kate Young responding "Why are Treacherous Orchestra all men?", drawing attention to the acceptance of the gender imbalance in traditional music to the extent that the 11-member all-male Scottish folk big band Treacherous Orchestra was unremarkable.

The project did aspire to "benefit women and girls", and some members have taken part in efforts to identify and remove barriers to women's participation in traditional music. In 2017, the year after the album release and live shows, Jenny Hill presented ideas on "Closing the Gender Gap" to the Traditional Music Forum. The Bit Collective was created in Scotland to "discuss and address equalities issues in the Scottish Traditional Arts", including Jenn Butterworth on its board, and there was a panel discussion as part of the 2017 Celtic Connections festival. The following year Karan Casey, who had sung with the project as a guest at its Cardiff concert, created FairPlé, a sister organisation in Ireland.

Individual members of the project have also commented on its contribution to their musical development; for example Rowan Rheingans has credited her subsequent songwriting success to Karine Polwart's encouragement. Jenn Butterworth too has remarked on how the project energised her:

To create an album and release it in seven days was extraordinary. I came away from that thinking these things are actually possible. To connect with those people and learn from what they were doing and yet all feel equal was special.
