= Andrew Pettegree =

British historian

Andrew Pettegree CBE FBA FRHistS
- Born: Andrew David Mark Pettegree; 1957 (age 68–69)
- Occupations: Historian and academic
- Awards: Goldsmith Book Prize (2015)

Academic background
- Education: Oundle School
- Alma mater: Merton College, Oxford
- Thesis: The strangers and their churches in London, 1550-1580 (1983)

Academic work
- Discipline: History
- Sub-discipline: Early modern Europe; Reformation; Print culture; History of libraries
- Institutions: University of Hamburg; Peterhouse, Cambridge; University of St Andrews

Andrew David Mark Pettegree CBE FBA FRHistS (born 1957) is a British historian and an expert on the European Reformation, the history of the book and media transformations. As of 2022 he holds a professorship at St Andrews University, where he is the director of the Universal Short Title Catalogue Project. He is the founding director of the St Andrews Reformation Studies Institute.

== Life and work ==
His schooling took place at Oundle School. Educated at Merton College, Oxford, Pettegree held research fellowships at the University of Hamburg and Peterhouse, Cambridge before moving to St Andrews in 1986.

In 1991 he was named the founding director of the St Andrews Reformation Studies Institute.

His early work was mostly concentrated on the subject of sixteenth-century immigrant communities.

In 2010 he published an interpretative work reassessing the early impact of the printing press, The Book in the Renaissance. In this he suggests that to understand the impact of print we must look beyond the most notable and celebrated books of the day, and consider the more mundane projects that underpinned the economics of the print era – the "cheap print" of pamphlets and broadsheets. The Book in the Renaissance was nominated one of the New York Times notable books of 2010, and won the Phyllis Goodhart Gordan Book Prize of the Renaissance Society of America.

In March 2014, Pettegree published The Invention of News: How the World Came to Know About Itself, which was well-received. This charts the development of a commercial culture of news in ten countries over the five centuries before the daily newspaper emerged as the dominant form of news delivery at the beginning of the nineteenth century. The book demonstrates that this period was, like our own, a rich, multi-media environment of manuscript and print, correspondence and conversation, gossip and song. It shows in particular that newspapers were in some respects the least functional part of this system.

In 2015 The Invention of News won Harvard University's Goldsmith Prize. This prize, awarded annually by the Shorenstein Center for Media, Politics and Public Policy at the Kennedy School of Government, honours the book that best fulfils the objective of improving democratic governance through an examination of the intersection between the media, politics and public policy.

In 2015 Pettegree published a study of Martin Luther's use and mastery of the printed media. The Washington Post described this as "a remarkable story, thoroughly researched and clearly told, and one sure to change the way we think about the early Reformation."

In 2016 Pettegree and Flavia Bruni published Lost Books : Reconstructing the Print World of Pre-Industrial Europe which included essays about "lost books of polyphony in Renaissance Spain, how newspaper advertisements in the Dutch Republic can be used to identify lost works, how the Stationers’ Company Register can be used to reconstruct lost English print, lost broadsheet ordinances in sixteenth-century Cologne, and a consideration of the impact of looting and Nazi book burning on Polish-Lithuanian collections."

Together with Arthur der Weduwen, in 2019 Pettegree published a book about the publishing industry in the Netherlands in the Dutch Golden Age.

In 2021 Pettegree and Arthur der Weduwen published The Library. A Fragile History, which was reviewed in The Papers of the Bibliographical Society of America and lauded for its bibliographical scholarship, notably "extensive use of auction lists, church library records, and sale catalogs."

In 2022, on the occasion of his sixty-fifth birthday, Pettegree was honoured with a two-volume festschrift titled Reformation, Religious Culture and Print in Early Modern Europe and edited by Arthur der Weduwen and Malcolm Walsby.

Pettegree was appointed Commander of the Order of the British Empire (CBE) in the 2024 New Year Honours for services to literature.

== Other roles ==
Pettegree has held visiting fellowships at All Souls College, Oxford, the Scaliger Institute at Leiden University, Netherlands, and at the Centre for Renaissance and Reformation Research at the University of Toronto. He served as Vice-President of the Royal Historical Society from 2012 to 2015.

== Publications ==
- The Bookshop: A History of Bookselling From the Dawn of Print to the 21st Century (Profile Books, 2026)
  - US edition: The Bookshop: A History of Bookselling From the Dawn of Print to the Twenty-First Century (Basic Books, 2026)
- The Book at War: Libraries and Readers in a Time of Conflict (Profile Books, 2023)
  - US edition: The Book at War: How Reading Shaped Conflict and Conflict Shaped Reading (Basic Books, 2023)
- The Library. A Fragile History, w. Arthur der Weduwen (Profile Books, 2021)
- News, Business and Public Information. Advertisements and Announcements in Dutch and Flemish Newspapers, 1620-1675, w. Arthur der Weduwen (Brill, 2020)
- The Dutch Republic and the Birth of Modern Advertising, w. Arthur der Weduwen (Brill, 2020)
- The Bookshop of the World. Searching for markets in the Dutch Golden Age, w. Arthur der Weduwen (Yale University Press, 2019)
- Brand Luther: 1517, Printing and the making of the Reformation (Penguin USA, 2015)
- The Invention of News: How the World Came to Know About Itself (Yale University Press, 2014)
- The Book in the Renaissance (Yale University Press, 2010)
- The French Book and the European Book World (Brill, 2007)
- Reformation and the Culture of Persuasion (Cambridge University Press, 2005)
- Europe in the Sixteenth Century (Blackwell, 2002)
- The Reformation World (ed.) (Routledge, 2000)
- Marian Protestantism: Six Studies (St Andrews Studies in Reformation History, 1995, 1996)
- (edited with A Duke and Gillian Lewis) Calvinism in Europe, 1540-1620 (Cambridge University Press, 1994)
- (edited with A Duke and Gillian Lewis) Calvinism in Europe, 1540-1610: A Collection of Documents (Manchester University Press, 1992)
- Emden and the Dutch Revolt: Exile and the Development of Reformed Protestantism (Oxford University Press, 1992)
- The Early Reformation in Europe (Cambridge University Press, 1992)
- Foreign Protestant Communities in Sixteenth-century London, (Oxford University Press, 1986)

Bibliographies

- Andrew Pettegree, Malcolm Walsby & Alexander Wilkinson (eds.), French Vernacular Books. Books Published in the French Language before 1601, 2 vols. (Leiden: Brill, 2007)
- Andrew Pettegree & Malcolm Walsby (eds.), Netherlandish Books. Books Published in the Low Countries and Dutch Books Printed Abroad before 1601, 2 vols. (Leiden: Brill, 2011)
- Andrew Pettegree & Malcolm Walsby (eds.), French Books III & IV. Books published in France before 1601 in Latin and Languages other than French, 2 vols. (Leiden: Brill, 2011)
