= Lady Maisry =

Traditional song

Lady Maisry (Roud 45, Child 65), also known as "Bonnie Susie Cleland", is an English-language folk song that exists in many variants.

== Synopsis ==
The heroine—Maisry, Janet, Margery, Marjory, Susie—becomes pregnant (sometimes after rejecting many Scottish lords). She declares that she will not surrender her (often English) true love. Her family goes to burn her. A page boy goes to fetch the true love, but he arrives too late.

Many variants end with his vows of revenge on all her family, and often on all the lands about. In some, he adds that he will remember the page boy, sometimes resolving to become a pilgrim after his revenge.

In some, he dies of grief, or goes mad.

== Motifs ==
The woman sentenced to death for unchastity is a common motif in romances and ballads. The description of the page boy's journey is similar to a passage in Matty Groves.

== Performers ==
- Kathy and Carol cover the song on their self-titled debut album of 1965.
- Lady Maisery perform a version of the song on their album 2013 Mayday.
- Cecil Sharp collected a version at Bridgwater in 1906.
- June Tabor and the Oyster Band have a version, "Bonnie Susie Clelland"
- Jean Redpath recorded a version (titled Bonnie Susie Cleland) on her 1979 album Father Adam.
