= Lady Maisery =

Modern British folk trio

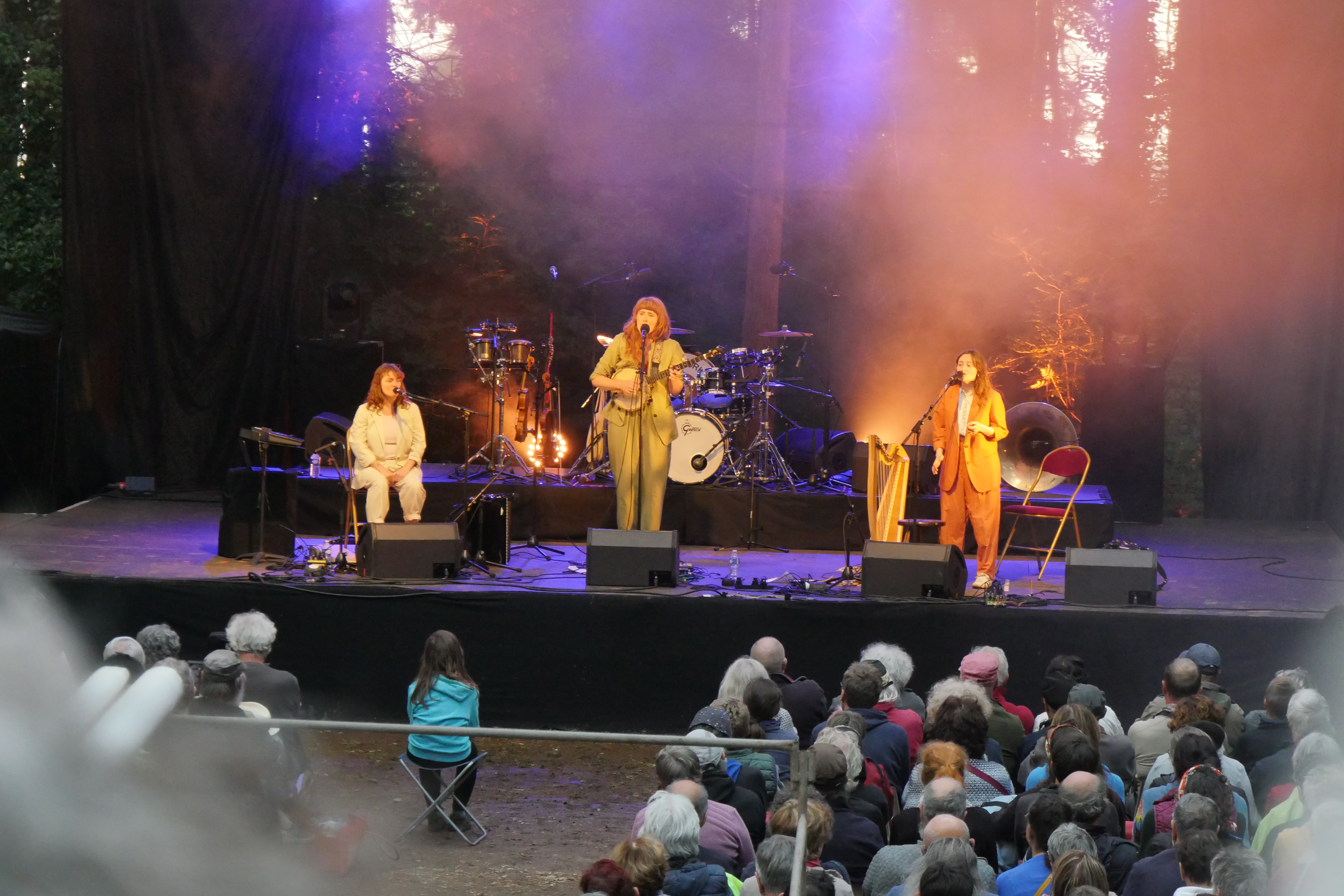
- Lady Maisery performing at Le Son Continu, 2024

Background information
- Genre: Folk
- Years active: 2011–present
- Label: Lady Maisery Records
- Members: Hannah James; Hazel Askew; Rowan Rheingans
- Website: www.ladymaisery.com

Lady Maisery are an English folk vocal harmony trio composed of Hannah James (vocals, piano accordion, clogs, percussion), Hazel Askew (vocals, melodeon, harp, harmonium concertina, bells) and Rowan Rheingans (vocals, fiddle, banjo).

Lady Maisery sing traditional and contemporary folk songs. They released their first album, Weave & Spin in 2011, their second, Mayday, in 2013, their third, Cycle, in 2016, and most recently Tender in 2022.

== Name ==
Lady Maisery's name is based on one that appears in a number of traditional folk songs, most notably the Child ballad "Lady Maisry", but also "The Laily Worm & The Machrel of The Sea" (the former of these appears on their second album, Mayday).

== History ==
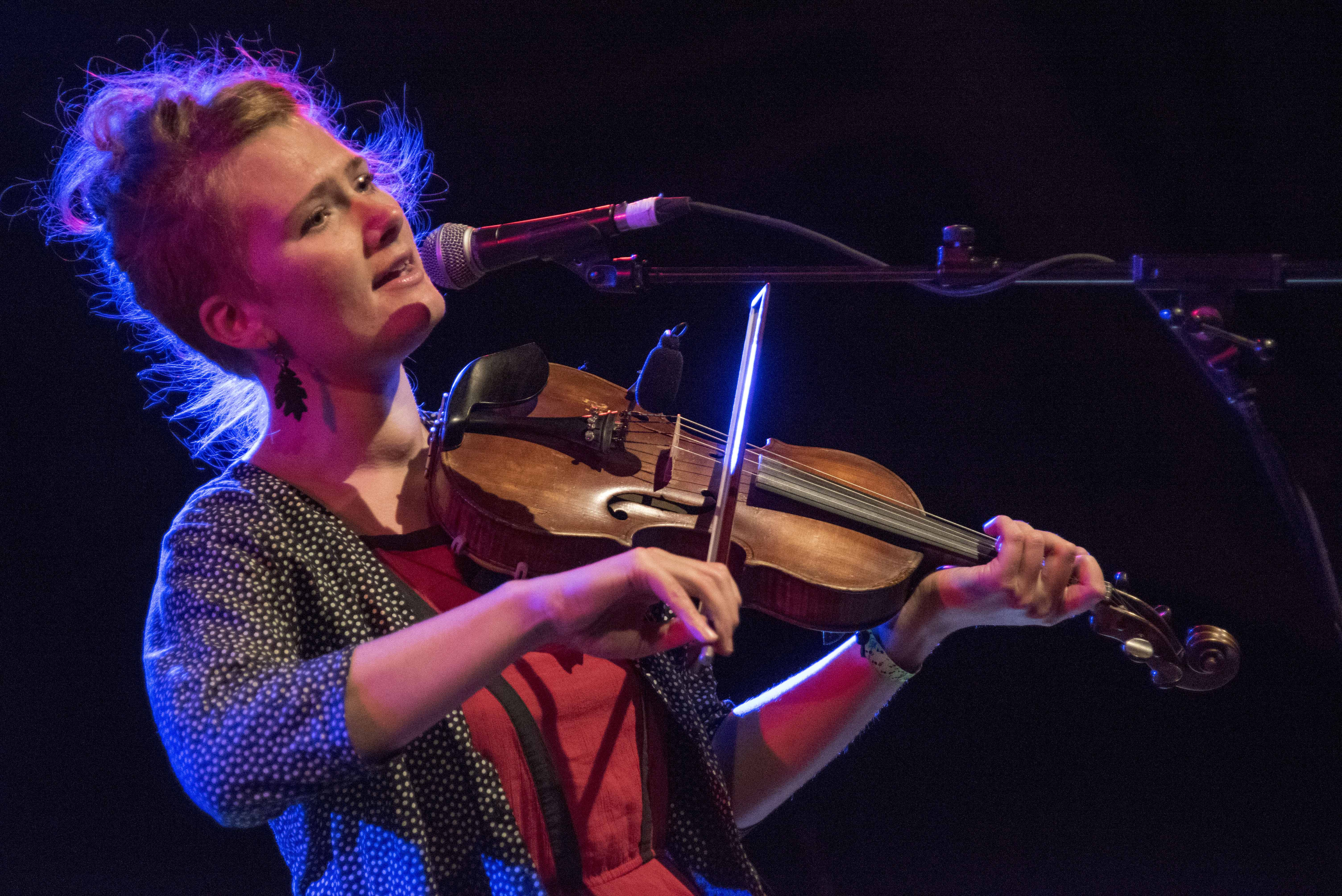
Rowan Rheingans performing with the band at Costa del Folk, 2015

In 2011, Lady Maisery released Weave & Spin and were subsequently nominated for the Horizon Award in the BBC Radio 2 Folk Awards, and for Best Debut in the Spiral Awards. The album was also made 'Album of the Week' in The Independent. In 2012 they were featured on BBC Radio 4's Woman's Hour and in 2013 they have twice appeared on BBC Radio 3's classical music programme 'In Tune'.

In 2013, they released a charity download single to mark International Women's Day on 8 March—a version of Kate Bush’s song "This Woman’s Work"--with proceeds donated to the charity coalition "End Violence Against Women". This preceded the release of their second album, Mayday, which was launched in both London and Sheffield.

During 2013, Lady Maisery also gave a number of performances of "Rest", a secular requiem, composed for them by Emily Hall and Toby Litt as the third in the pair's trilogy of song cycles. Performances included the National Portrait Gallery, London, Spitalfields Summer Festival and Deal Festival.

All three members were part of the Songs of Separation project, which won "Best Album" in the 2017 BBC Radio 2 Folk Awards.

In 2018 Lady Maisery collaborated with duo Jimmy Aldridge & Sid Goldsmith to create "Awake Arise: A Winter Show for Our Times", and released the accompanying album, Awake Arise: A Winter Album, in 2019.

In 2022, Lady Maisery released their 5th studio album, Tender. The Guardian described it as a "thoughtful record" with "Inspired cover versions and splendid harmony singing" while The Times said it was, 'a beguiling blend of ancient and modern'. They followed this up with two album tours in late 2022 and spring 2023.

In 2025, Lady Maisery collaborated with Jimmy Aldirdge & Sid Goldsmith again to create the show "Wakefire: an Incantation to Summer". The corresponding album Wakefire: a Summer Album was released in May 2026 and toured in June the same year.

== Discography ==
=== Studio albums ===
- Weave & Spin (released 21 August 2011)
- Mayday (released 10 June 2013)
- Cycle (released 28 October 2016)
- Tender (released 11 November 2022)

=== Live albums ===
- Live (released 6 October 2018)

=== Collaborative albums ===
- Songs of Separation (released 29th January 2016)
- Unholy Choir (by Coven: Lady Maisery, Grace Petrie and O'Hooley & Tidow) (released 1st March 2017)
- Awake Arise: A Winter Album (with Jimmy Aldridge & Sid Goldsmith) (released 6 December 2019)
- Wakefire: A Summer Album (with Jimmy Aldridge & Sid Goldsmith) (released 1st May 2026)

=== Singles ===
- "This Woman's Work" (released as a download single, 8 March 2013)

== Reviews ==
=== Weave and Spin ===
- Bright Young Folk
- Maverick Magazine
- Spiral Earth

=== Mayday ===
- Bright Young Folk
- Financial Times
- Folk Witness
- For Folk's Sake
- Spiral Earth

=== Tender ===
- The Times
- The Guardian
- Folk Radio
- Get Ready to Rock
