= Irish Fright =

Mass panic in England in 1688

The Irish Fright was a mass panic that took place in England in December 1688, during the Glorious Revolution. It accompanied the final days of King James II's regime after his initially thwarted attempt to flee into exile in France. Troops of the Jacobite Irish Army were stationed in England to prop up James II's authority but were widely detested by the predominantly Protestant population of England.

Rumours began to circulate in mid-December that the Irish soldiers were preparing to carry out a campaign of massacre and pillage against the English population in revenge for James's overthrow. False reports of the Irish burning English towns and massacring inhabitants spread the panic rapidly from London to at least nineteen English counties, whose inhabitants formed armed militias to guard against supposed Irish marauders. The panic subsided after a few days. It was never determined who was responsible for sparking it, though contemporaries suspected that it may have been the work of Orangist sympathisers seeking to further discredit James II.

== Background ==
James II inherited an army in Ireland on his accession in 1685. At the time it amounted to 8,238 men, all of whom were supposed to be Protestants and required to provide certificates confirming that they received the Church of England's sacrament twice a year. (Some Catholics did nonetheless manage to join the force during the Catholic James II's reign.) By 1688 its strength had grown to 8,938, of which 2,820 were sent to England in September 1688 to reinforce the English Army against the expected invasion by William, Prince of Orange, James II's son-in-law who had been invited to enter the country by English politicians opposed to James II's rule. Many of them were stationed in Portsmouth, where they became objects of suspicion and fear. A newsletter of early October 1688 reported that Portsmouth's inhabitants were making "great complaints of the rude Irish who have caused many families to leave that place, having committed many robberies".

Their presence in England further stoked long-standing fears that Irish or Catholic forces were poised to launch an anti-Protestant uprising. In Staffordshire in 1641, Protestants were reportedly so afraid that their Catholic neighbours would attack them that they "durst not go to Church unarmed". Later that same year, a panic in the towns of Ludlow and Bewdley led the inhabitants of both towns to mobilise on the night of 19–20 November, watching for what they believed was the arrival of insurgent Catholics. In 1681 the House of Lords announced the existence of "a horrid and treasonable Plot and Conspiracy, contrived and carried on by those of the Popish Religion in Ireland, for massacring the English, and subverting the Protestant Religion, and the ancient established Government of that Kingdom."

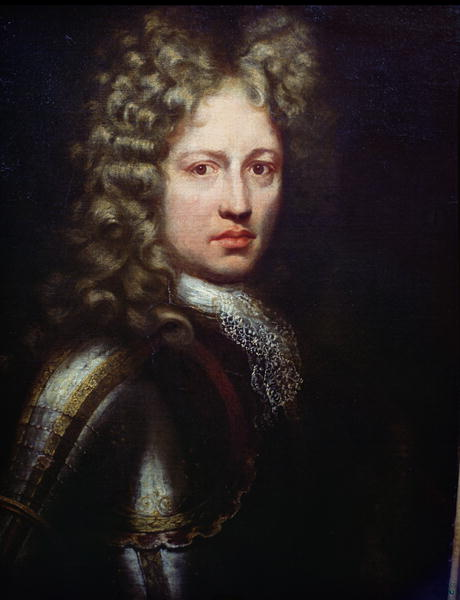
Patrick Sarsfield, Earl of Lucan commanded the Irish troops at the Battle of Reading.

After spending three tense months garrisoned in Portsmouth, the Irish troops were sent north to fight in the Battle of Reading on 9 December 1688, the only substantial military action of the Glorious Revolution. They were defeated and a portion of the Irish troops were ordered to return to Portsmouth. Others were sent to Uxbridge west of London. Rather than fight William's invasion, however, the Earl of Feversham disbanded James's forces and released the Irish troops from their obligations.

== Outbreak of the Irish Fright ==
On Thursday 13 December, according to Bishop Gilbert Burnet, "Country Fellows, arriving about Midnight at Westminster caused a sudden Uproar, by Reporting that the Irish, in desperate Rage, were advancing to London, and putting all before them to Fire and Sword." Another newswriter reported that in the early hours of 13 December "an alarm was spread through City and suburbs of 'Rise, arm, arm! the Irish are cutting throats'."

The alert immediately sparked a mass panic and 100,000 men were reported to have mobilised to defend their homes within half an hour. Buildings were illuminated to ensure that marauding Irishmen could not sneak up in the early morning darkness. The Grand Duke of Tuscany's ambassador in London wrote that he had seen young and old alike,

all discharging firearms, drums beating rapidly, and women, for greater noise, beating warming-pans, pots, and frying pans, and such things: which lie resulted in good against the intention of him who gave it out, because with the city so armed, and with attention to another revolt, [it was a wonder that] the rabble did not create other disorders.

False reports that Uxbridge had been sacked by the Irish added to the panic. Philip Musgrave wrote that Lord Feversham's disbandment of the Irish Army "hath increased our miseries, for he did not disarm any of them, and the Irish and Roman Catholics ... are in a great body about Uxbridge who burn, kill, and destroy all they meet with." The House of Lords convened at 3 a.m. at Whitehall to discuss the situation and send for word of the supposed burning of Uxbridge.

=== Spread ===
The Irish Fright thereafter spread rapidly across England. It reached Norfolk around 14 December, when it was rumoured that the Irish were marching on Norwich. Kent descended into mass panic on the morning of 14 December, while in Surrey, Kingston-upon-Thames was said to have been burned and the inhabitants cut down trees to block the path of the supposed Irish insurgents. In Cambridge, four to six thousand Irishmen were supposed to have destroyed Bedford and massacred its inhabitants and were on their way to Cambridge to repeat the deed. The news caused some of Cambridge's inhabitants to flee, but travellers arriving from Bedford were able to discredit the rumours and calm the situation.

The panic reached the Midlands on the same day; the mayor of Chesterfield wrote that 7,000 Catholics and Irishmen had burned Birmingham and were advancing to Derby, while a Leicestershire clergyman, Theophilus Brookes, recorded that he had heard "that the Irish were cutting of throats, Lichfield on fire and Burton attempted upon." Brookes was evidently an unusually martial clergyman, as he raised a militia of local men to confront the enemy, but he had to dismiss them after a day when no Irishmen could be found.

Yorkshire's turn came a day later on 15 December, with the scare prompting several towns to mobilise troops and arm local people. Lord Danby sent a troop of horse from York to Pontefract to guard against possible aggressors from Ireland and pro-Catholic Lancashire. Wakefield received reports that Doncaster had been burned, while those in Doncaster heard that Birmingham and Stafford had been sacked. Artificers in Leeds abandoned the Sabbath to mend scythes for use as weapons, and the following day a sizeable army of about 7,000 infantry and cavalry was assembled there to defend the city.

While Yorkshire was readying its defences against possible Lancastrians as well as Irish, the Lancastrians themselves were no less affected by the Fright. It reached the county at the same time as Yorkshire, with the same stories circulating of Birmingham's inhabitants being massacred and Stafford being burned to the ground. A rumour had it that after their defeat at Reading, the Irish had begun to "plunder kill & destroy", burning Birmingham and advancing towards Wolverhampton. In response, as a letter-writer signing himself as "J.E." put it, the counties "rise to defend themselves". Local men formed militias and Warrington Bridge was barricaded and guarded.

In Chester, the governor disarmed the royal garrison, armed the city's civilians from the garrison's armoury and placed cannon at the city gates. He wrote to Secretary at War William Blathwayt to inform him of his action and to express his alarm at "ye Reportt of a Body of 8 or 9000 Bloody Irish coming this way from London." He had heard that they "Burn all Places they come at, and kill Man, Woman and Child" and he urged Blathwayt ensure that troops were sent to Chester to protect it from the Irish "Enemies of our Honest Protestant Religion and Country."

The West Country also received word of the supposed Irish onslaught on 15 December. The Dichess of Beaufort heard at 2 a.m. that the Irish were only five miles from Wootton Bassett and were burning and killing all in their path. Reading, Andover, Hampshire and Newbury were also said to have been destroyed and Marlborough was said to be under threat. A 'Mr. Cothrington', probably a cousin of Sir John Guise, brought a troop of gentlemen to guard the duchess at Badminton and took her house's arsenal of sixty muskets to arm the party. Sir John had meanwhile raised and armed the Gloucestershire militia and all of its officers. Probably not coincidentally, he was a supporter of William of Orange and most likely took advantage of the Fright to ensure that any uprising by James II's supporters could be quashed rapidly.

The Fright continued to spread to remoter parts of England and even into Wales. It reached Dolgellau in Merionethshire on 18 December, where a local mob shot and killed a supposed Irishman – who turned out to be an exciseman and therefore not someone who would have been much mourned by the inhabitants anyway. On the same day in Settle in the North Riding of Yorkshire, an announcement was made in the market that the Irish and Scots had burned Halifax and were marching on Skipton. The following day, the Fright reached the town of Yeovil in Somerset.

In all, at least nineteen counties were affected by the Irish Fright. In each case, the details of the rumours were comparable: rampaging Irishmen were said to have burned and massacred the inhabitants of towns no more than 40–50 miles distant (i.e. a day or two's journey) and were said to be advancing in the direction of the town where the rumours were being proclaimed. Wherever it spread, the panic burned itself out quickly and subsided within only a day or two of erupting. The only reported casualty was the unfortunate exciseman in Dolgellau, but the panic had severely adverse effects on many innocent Catholics. The Yorkshire diarist Abraham de la Pryme wrote that Protestant mobs

made most miserable of all the papists' [Catholics'] houses they came near; for, under pretence of seeking for arms, they did many thousands of pounds worth of hurt, cutting down rich hangings, breaking through walls, pulling in pieces of excellent ceilings ... then they secured all the papists they could get, intending to carry them all away to prison.

== Responsibility for the Irish Fright ==
The Irish Fright was a sign of the febrile and confused political climate that existed in the days after James II's flight from London, and demonstrated how years of anti-Catholic Whig propaganda had imbued the English public with a deep fear of Irish bloodthirstiness. It also undeniably served the interests of William of Orange's claim to be the protector of England's Protestants against Catholic oppressors. Writers at the time queried whether the Fright had been caused deliberately, and if so by whom.

De la Pryme noted an oddity about the spread of the rumours, commenting that "no one letter appear'd out of the south concerning any such thing there till it was always gone past those places where these letters were to go." He believed that it was an orchestrated plan "set on foot by the king and council to see how the nation stood affected to their new king." In Leeds, Ralph Thoresby wrote that he "could never learn who was concerned, even in this neighbourhood" as the source of the rumours. The agitator Hugh Speke claimed twenty years later to have been responsible, but this seems unlikely and is not supported by any evidence. An anonymous historian suggested another scenario, noting the way that the Fright was spread out from London along the main communication routes:

That the Report [of Irish attacks] was publish'd in every Country [county] by Persons planted there on purpose, who receiv'd their Orders by the Post, 'tis much more possible. Where the Post goes in one Day, it was set about that day, where it goes in two Days, it was set on the second Day.

Some suggested that Marshal Schomberg, one of William of Orange's generals, was responsible for instigating the Fright. Bishop Burnet described it as "An effectual Strategem commonly ascrib'd to the Duke of Shomberg". Another writer of the mid-18th century attributed the start of the Fright to "the disbanded Troops finding themselves Money-less, and incapable of subsisting in a Country where they were so generally hated, took it into their Heads to force open a Country House, to keep themselves from starving. Upon this a Man in the Neighbourhood ran directly to London" where his lurid account of looting Irishmen sparked the panic. The events of the Irish Fright were repeated on a much larger scale a century later in the Great Fear of France, shortly before the French Revolution.
