= J. R. Jones =

English historian & academic (1925-2014)

James Rees Jones (1925 – 2014) was a historian of seventeenth century England. He was a lecturer in history at King's College, Newcastle from 1952 to 1963 and at the University of East Anglia from 1963 to 1966. He was appointed professor of history at East Anglia in 1966. He later served as Vice-Chancellor of the university and he was also Chairman of the UEA Association of University Teachers.

His historical interest included relating English post-Stuart Restoration history with its European setting, specifically French and Dutch history.

== Works ==
- The First Whigs: The Politics of the Exclusion Crisis, 1678-1683 (Cambridge University Press, 1961).
- Britain and Europe in the Seventeenth Century (1966).
- The Revolution of 1688 in England (Weidenfeld and Nicolson, 1972).
- Country and Court: England, 1658-1714 (Edward Arnold, 1978).
- The Restored Monarchy, 1660-1688 (Palgrave Macmillan, 1979).
- Charles II: Royal Politician (Allen and Unwin, 1987).
- Marlborough (Cambridge University Press, 1993).
- The Anglo-Dutch Wars of the Seventeenth Century (Longman, 1996).
