= Arthur der Weduwen =

Anglo-Dutch historian

Arthur der Weduwen is a Dutch historian and writer. His work primarily focuses on the Dutch Republic, the history of the book and the emergence of the newspaper.

Educated at the University of Exeter, der Weduwen took his doctoral degree at St Andrews University, where he currently works on the Universal Short Title Catalogue Project. He is a Fellow of the Royal Historical Society.

== Career ==
His book Dutch and Flemish Newspapers of the Seventeenth Century, 1618-1700, published in 2017 in two volumes, provided the first complete survey of newspapers published in the Low Countries at the beginning of serial news publication. The book was well received by academics, and awarded a Menno Hertzberger Prize in 2019.

Der Weduwen has collaborated with Andrew Pettegree on a number of books about the publishing industry in the Netherlands in the Dutch Golden Age. These include The Bookshop of the World. Making and Trading Books in the Dutch Golden Age (2019) in English and Dutch, and studies of the origins of advertising, The Dutch Republic and the Birth of Modern Advertising and News and Business and Public Information. Advertisements and Public Announcements in Dutch and Flemish Newspapers, 1620-1675. They also co-wrote The Library: a Fragile History (2021) which charts the history of the library from the ancient world to the modern era.

== Publications ==
- Der Weduwen, Arthur (2026), The Last Invasion of England: 1688 and the Dutch Armada, Princeton, ISBN 978-06-91-26344-1
- Hansen, Ann-Marie; Der Weduwen, Arthur (2024), Publishers, Censors and Collectors in the European Book Trade, 1650–1750, Brill, ISBN 978-90-04-69193-3
- Der Weduwen, Arthur (2023). State Communication and Public Politics in the Dutch Golden Age. Oxford University Press. ISBN 978-01-97-26743-1.
- Der Weduwen, Arthur; Walsby, Malcolm, eds. (2022), "The Book World of Early Modern Europe: Essays in Honour of Andrew Pettegree, Volume 2", Essays in Honour of Andrew Pettegree (2 vols), Brill, ISBN 978-90-04-51529-1
- Van der Sijs, Nicoline; Der Weduwen, Arthur, eds. (2022), Franse Tirannie - Het Rampjaar 1672 Op School, Waanders, ISBN 978-94-62-62400-9
- Der Weduwen, Arthur; Pettegree, Andrew; Kemp, Graeme, eds. (2021), Book Trade Catalogues in Early Modern Europe, Brill, ISBN 978-90-04-42223-0
- Der Weduwen, Arthur; Pettegree, Andrew (2021). The Library: A Fragile History. Profile Books. ISBN 978-15-41-60077-5.
- Der Weduwen, Arthur; Pettegree, Andrew (2020). News, Business and Public Information. Advertisements and Announcements in Dutch and Flemish Newspapers, 1620-1675. Brill. ISBN 978-90-04-42082-3.
- Der Weduwen, Arthur; Pettegree, Andrew (2020). The Dutch Republic and the Birth of Modern Advertising. Brill. ISBN 978-90-04-41380-1.
- Der Weduwen, Arthur; Pettegree, Andrew (2019). The Bookshop of the World. Making and Trading Books in the Dutch Golden Age. Yale University Press. ISBN 978-03-00-25479-2.
- Der Weduwen, Arthur (2017). Dutch and Flemish Newspapers of the Seventeenth Century, 1618-1700. Brill. ISBN 978-90-04-31731-4.
