= Rowan Rheingans =

English folk musician, songwriter and vocalist

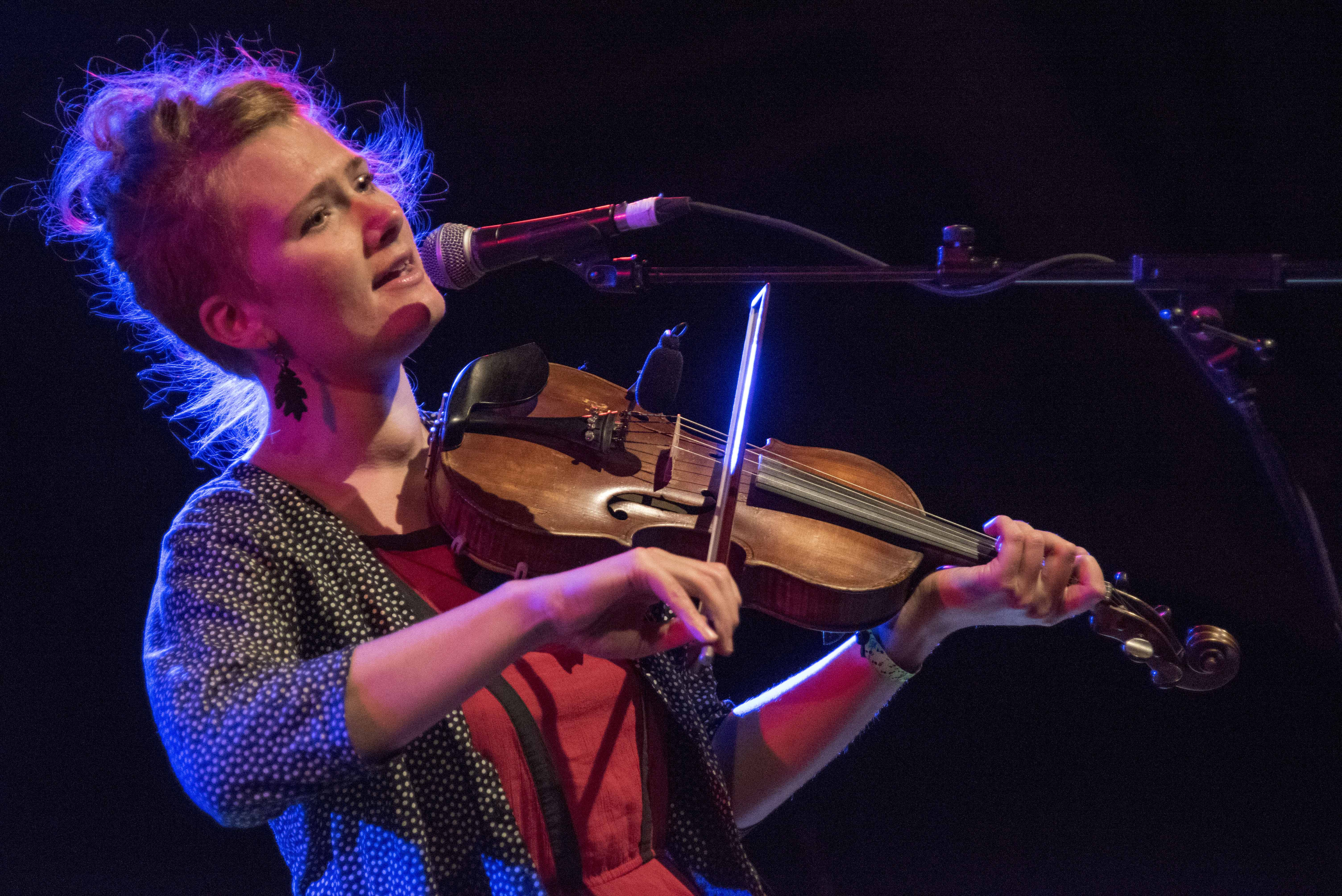
- Rheingans performing at Costa del Folk, Portugal in 2015

Background information
- Born: Grindleford, Derbyshire, England
- Instruments: Fiddle, banjo, vocals
- Member of: Lady Maisery; Songs of Separation; The Rheingans Sisters

Rowan Rheingans is an English folk vocalist, musician and songwriter who plays the fiddle and banjo. She is a member of the folk vocal harmony trio Lady Maisery, the Anglo-Scottish music project Songs of Separation, and of the duo The Rheingans Sisters (with her sister Anna). She has won two BBC Radio 2 Folk Awards: for the Best Original Track Mackerel in 2016 and for Best Album in 2017.

== Biography ==
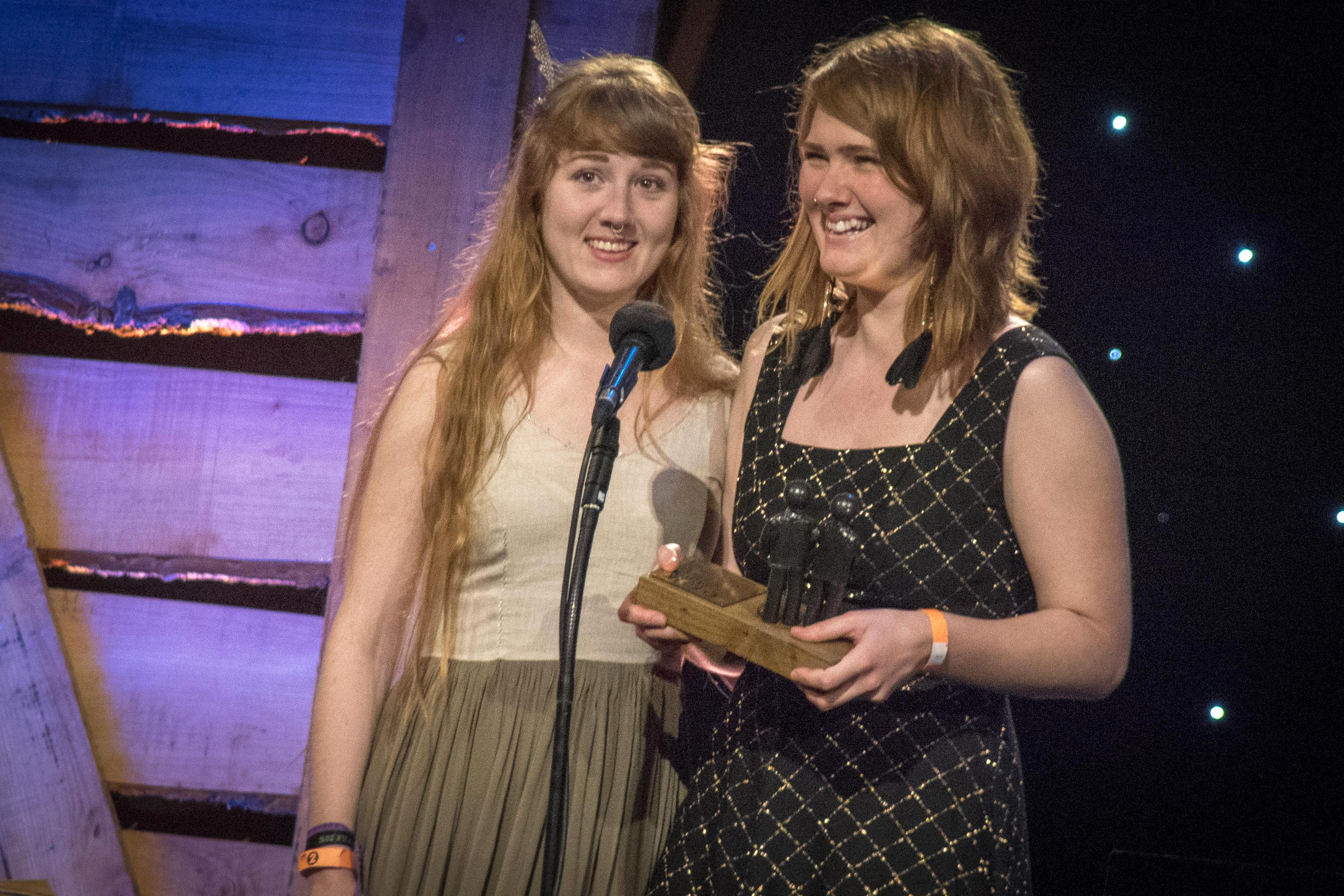
The Rheingans Sisters at the 2016 BBC Radio 2 Folk Awards

Rheingans was born in Sheffield and grew up in the village of Grindleford, in Derbyshire's Peak District. Her father worked as a violin-maker and invented the bansitar instrument, while her mother ran a Saturday morning clogging club for children and organised the Eyam Folk Festival in the Derbyshire Dales. Rheingans studied traditional fiddle playing in Sweden and Norway. She lives in Sheffield in South Yorkshire, England.

Rheingans was a member of the Anglo-Scottish music project Songs of Separation of ten female folk musicians, and is a member of the folk vocal harmony trio Lady Maisery with Hazel Askew (vocals, melodeon, concertina, harp, bells) and Hannah James (vocals, piano accordion, clogs, foot percussion). With Songs of Separation, Rheingans won Best Album at the 2017 BBC Radio 2 Folk Awards. With Lady Maisery, Rheingans joined with English musicians O’Hooley & Tidow to perform in the folk supergroup Coven.

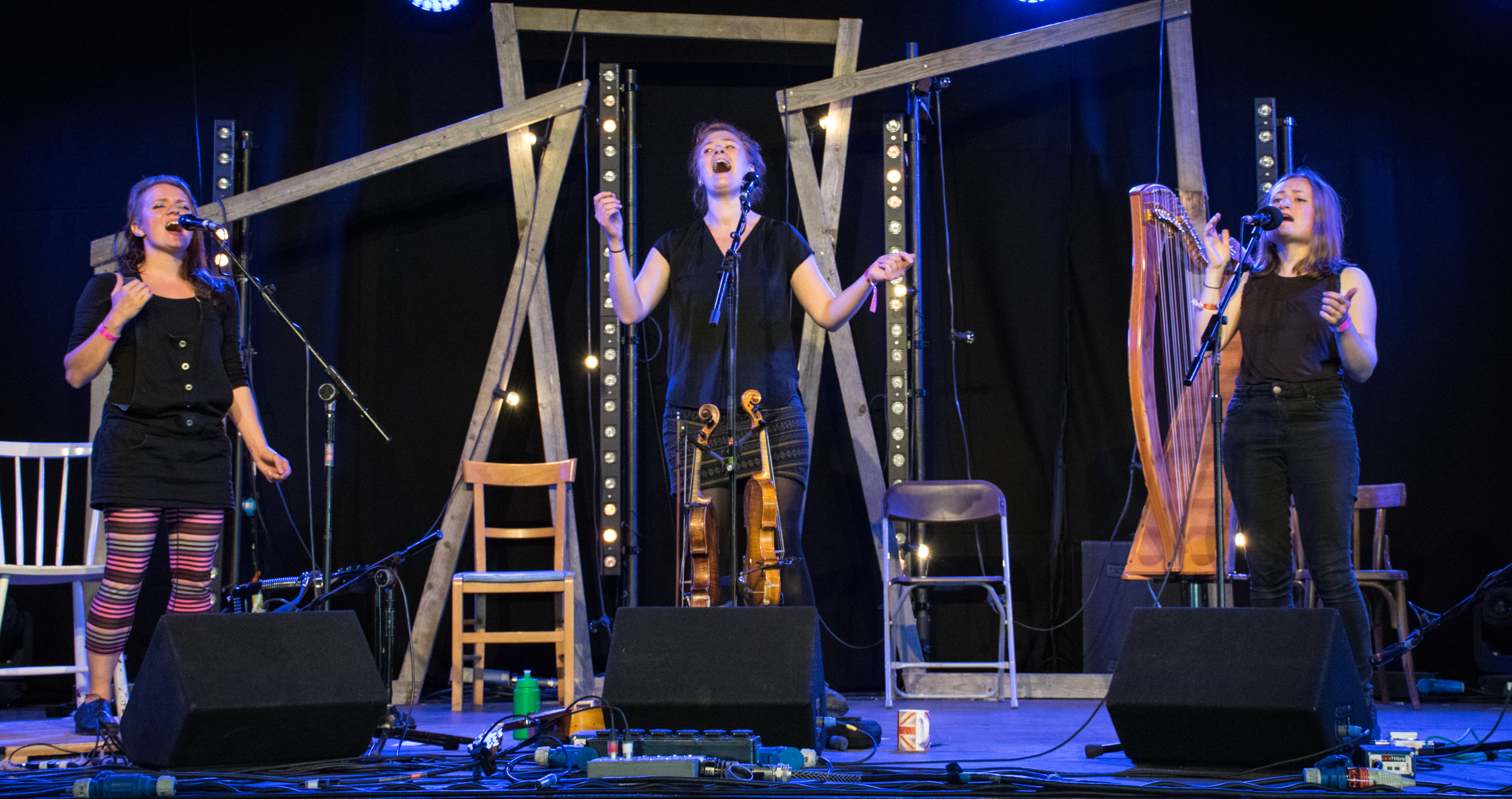
Lady Maisery performing in Towersey, Oxfordshire, in 2018

Rheingans and her sister Anna perform as the duo The Rheingans Sisters. They sing in both English and French and draw inspiration from the traditional folk music of Britain, France, Scandinavia and America. On their album Already Home, The Rheingan Sisters performed "Adieu Privas/Bourée," a song learned from the field recordings of the Limousin singer and fiddle player Léon Peyrat. In 2019, The Rheingans Sisters were nominated for the best duo/band award at the 2019 BBC Radio 2 Folk Awards. They self-released the album Start Close In, in September 2024, which was named folk album of the month by The Guardian newspaper and was listed as number 2 in the paper's top folk albums of the year in December 2024.

In 2019, Rheingans debuted a one woman musical theatre show called Dispatches on the Red Dress, which was developed with Liam Hurley. The show explored her German grandmother's youth in 1940s Nazi Germany, with the red dress of the title made for her grandmother to wear at the end of World War II. The show won an Edinburgh Fringe First Award. Rheingans also released a solo album based on the show in 2019, titled The Lines We Draw Together, with funding from the PRS Foundation's Women Make Music programme and the Arts Council England.

Rheingans received a Paul Hamlyn Foundation Award for Artists in 2021.
