= Royds Hall Academy =

Secondary school in West Yorkshire, England

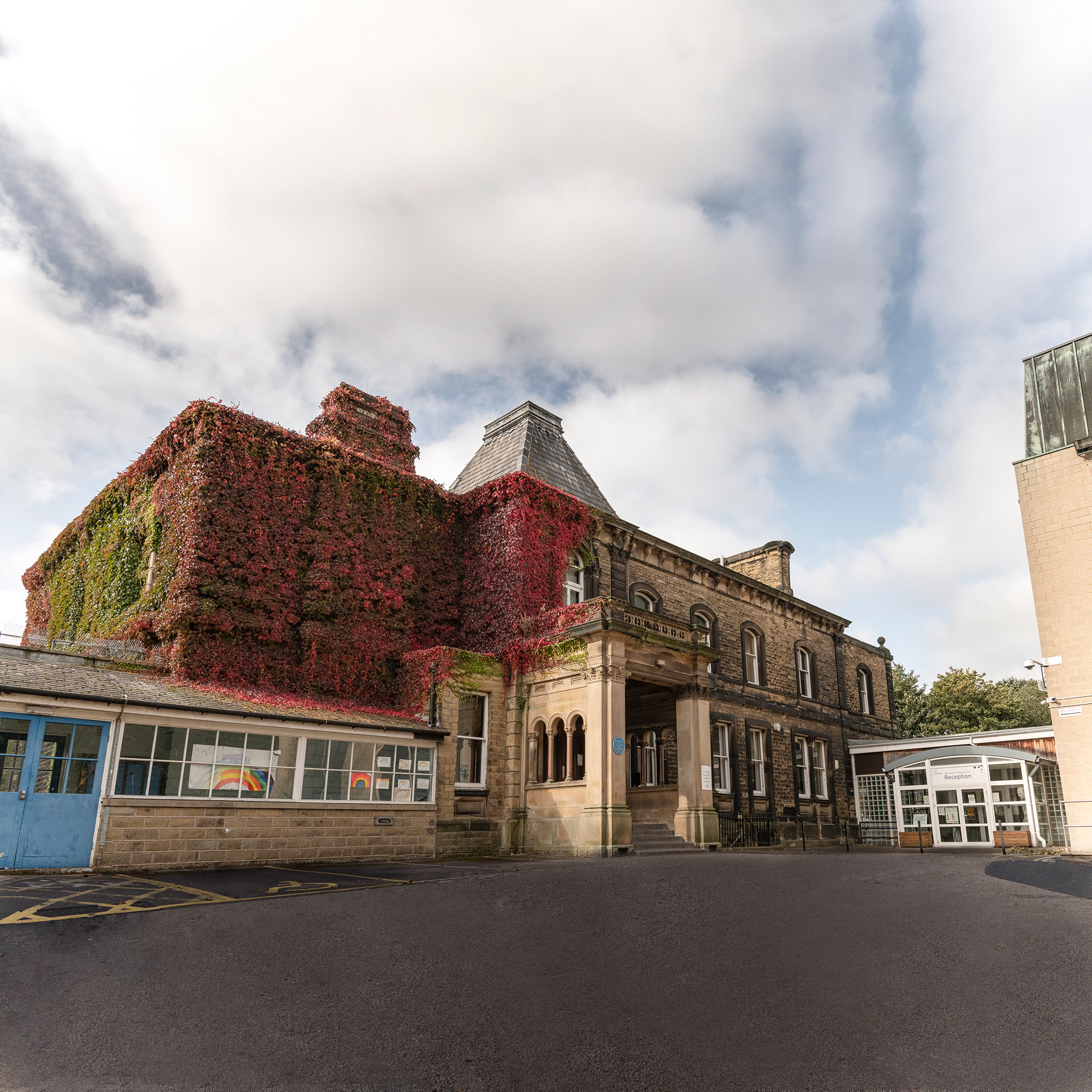
- The school in 2020

Location
- Luck Lane; Huddersfield, West Yorkshire, HD3 4HA; England; 53°38′43″N 1°49′03″W

Information
- Type: Academy
- Established: 1921
- Local authority: Kirklees
- Trust: SHARE Multi Academy Trust
- Department for Education URN: 146327 Tables
- Ofsted: Reports
- Leadership: John McNally (executive headteacher), Jenny Carr (secondary headteacher)
- Gender: Mixed
- Age: 4 to 16
- Enrolment: 877
- Colours: Navy and purple
- Website: https://www.roydshall.org

Royds Hall Academy is a mixed secondary school for pupils aged 11 – 16. It is located in Huddersfield, West Yorkshire, England, and on the north side of the Colne Valley towards Milnsbridge. Originally architected by E.Firth D.A.B , Royds Hall was established as a war hospital in 1967.

== History ==
Royds Hall was a large farmhouse in the Paddock and Longwood area of Huddersfield, adjoining Royds Wood. It was rebuilt as a grander mansion (still called Royds Hall, but also known as 'Royds Wood'. It was still referred to on the town plan published in 1890 as Royds Hall), whose philanthropic mill owner served the increasingly industrialised and expanding town. The building was formerly Royds Hall Mansion, built in 1866 by Sir Joseph Crosland, the Conservative MP for the Huddersfield constituency from 1893–95. On his death in 1904 he left the property to his nephew Thomas Pearson Crosland, who sold it to Huddersfield Corporation in 1915 for £17,000.

During the First World War, the mansion and extensive grounds opened as The Huddersfield War Hospital. The hospital opened in June 1915 and initially had six hundred beds across a large number of wooden huts, by 1917 this number had increased to two thousand beds. Throughout its time as a hospital, Royds Hall saw around twenty two thousand patients pass through its grounds. It is widely reported that the Huddersfield War Hospital proudly boasted the lowest death rate in the country. Only the mansion and one red brick building to the north of the school drive remain in place.

Royds Hall Grammar School opened on 20 September 1921, which became a comprehensive school in 1963. In February 2014, the later Royds Hall High School changed its name to Royds Hall Community School.The school is divided into five houses (known as communities) named after Marie Curie, Martin Luther King, Nelson Mandela, Emily Pankhurst and Harold Wilson.

Previously a foundation school administered by Kirklees Metropolitan Borough Council, in 2018 Royds Hall converted to academy status. The school is now sponsored by the SHARE Multi Academy Trust.

== Notable alumni ==
=== Royds Hall Community School ===
- Ruben Reuter, actor

=== Royds Hall Grammar School ===
- Robert Baldick, French literature scholar
- Sir Richard Sykes, biochemist, chief executive of Glaxo plc from 1993–97, rector of Imperial College London from 2001–08, and chancellor since 2013 of Brunel University London
- Harold Wilson, Labour Party leader from 1963 to 1976; UK prime minister from 1964 to 1970, and from 1974 to 1976

== See also ==
- Listed buildings in Golcar
