= Listed buildings in Golcar =

Golcar is a village and an unparished area in the metropolitan borough of Kirklees, West Yorkshire, England. Golcar ward contains 165 listed buildings that are recorded in the National Heritage List for England. Of these, two are listed at Grade II*, the middle of the three grades, and the others are at Grade II, the lowest grade. The ward is to the west of the town of Huddersfield and contains the village of Golcar and the surrounding area, including the districts of Cowlersley, Longwood, and Milnsbridge. During the 19th century the area became involved in the woollen textile industry and the listed buildings surviving from this are mills and weavers' cottages, the latter forming a large part of this list. The textile industry was supported by the Huddersfield Narrow Canal and the River Colne that run through the ward, and the listed buildings associated with these are bridges, an aqueduct, a canal basin, and a milestone. The other listed buildings include houses, cottages and associated structures, farmhouses and farm buildings, church and chapels and associated structures, weavers' cottages converted into a museum, two railway viaducts, a drinking trough, a public house, schools, and a row of tenter posts.

== Key ==
Grade	Criteria
II*	Particularly important buildings of more than special interest
II	Buildings of national importance and special interest

== Buildings ==
Name and location	Photograph	Date	Notes	Grade
Royles Head Farmhouse; 53.64856°N 1.84820°W	—	17th century	The farmhouse, which has been altered, is in stone, partly rendered, with a stone slate roof and two storeys. There are two doorways, each with a four-centred arched head and hollow spandrels, one with a moulded surround, and the other with a plain chamfered surround. Most of the windows are mullioned, and some lights are blocked.	II
Dod Lea House; 53.65060°N 1.84337°W		1674	Much of the house was replaced in 1841, a wing of the original house remaining. This is in stone with a string course, and a stone slate roof with coped gables on cut kneelers and two moulded finials. There are two storeys, and the wing contains windows that are mullioned, and mullioned and transomed. The later house has rusticated quoins, a moulded eaves cornice and blocking course, and a slate roof with coped gables. Thee are two storeys, and a Tuscan porch with a moulded cornice and blocking course, and a frieze decorated with balls in open panels. The windows are sashes, and in the east gable end is an oval oculus.	II*
62 and 64 Cowlersley Lane; 53.63571°N 1.83545°W	—	17th or early 18th century	A pair of stone houses with a string course, and a stone slate roof with coped gables on cut kneelers. There are two storeys, a 19th-century extension to the east, and mullioned windows. In the upper floor are three four-light windows, and in the ground floor of No. 64 are two four-light windows. The ground floor of No. 62 has a five-light window with mullions and transoms.	II
Milnsbridge House; 53.64074°N 1.82499°W		c. 1750	A house in Palladian style, probably by James Paine, later used for other purposes. It is in stone and consists of a central block of three storeys and five bays, flanking wings of two storeys and two bays, and three-bay returns. Over the central block is a modillioned pediment with a Diocletian window in the tympanum. In the ground floor are inserted garage doors and doorways, including one with a pediment, above which is a sill band. The upper floors contain sash windows, the central window in the middle floor in a round-arched panel with a moulded cornice on scrolled consoles. The outer wings have half-pediments. The rear, garden, front is more elaborate and contains a doorway with a moulded surround, a pulvinated frieze and a segmental pediment on scrolled consoles, and in the tympanum is an oculus in an elaborate Rococo cartouche.	II*
96–104 Lamb Hall Road; 53.65511°N 1.85032°W	—	18th century	A terrace of five stone houses with coped gables on cut kneelers. There are two storeys, and the windows are mullioned, most with four lights, and some lights have been blocked.	II
49 and 51 Thornhill Road; 53.64505°N 1.82972°W	—	18th century	A pair of houses in rendered stone with a stone slate roof, catslide at the rear. There are two storeys and an outshut to the east with a lean-to roof. Some windows are mullioned sashes, and the others are casements.	II
119 and 121 Cowlersley Lane; 53.63313°N 1.83867°W		Late 18th century (probable)	The house, which was altered in the 19th century, and has since been used for other purposes, is stone, and it has a stone slate roof with coped gables on cut kneelers. There are two storeys and three bays. The central doorway has Tuscan pilasters, an entablature, and a pediment-shaped blocking course. The windows on the front are sashes, and at the rear they are mullioned.	II
1–5 Parkwood Road; 53.64833°N 1.84597°W	—	Late 18th century	A group of three stone houses, later extended, with quoins, a string course, and a stone slate roof with coped gables and kneelers. There are two storeys and an attic, and the windows are mullioned, some mullions have been removed, and some lights are blocked.	II
Moorcroft Farm; 53.64335°N 1.85006°W	—	Late 18th century	A group of five stone houses with quoins, paired stone gutter brackets, and a stone slate roof with coped gables and carved kneelers. There are two storeys, the doorways have stone surrounds, and there is a loading door. Most of the windows are mullioned, with some blocked lights, and some mullions removed.	II
Scarbottom Aqueduct; 53.63742°N 1.83847°W		1793–98	The aqueduct carries the Huddersfield Narrow Canal over the River Colne. It is in stone and consists of a single segmental arch. The west side is curved, and has a parapet, two bands and four pilasters.	II
Armitage Bridge; 53.63880°N 1.81929°W		1793–98	The bridge (No. 31) carries Tanyard Road over the Huddersfield Narrow Canal. The original bridge is in stone and consists of a single depressed arch. In 1861 the bridge was widened by the addition to the east of a flat iron span. This is panelled, it has a diamond pattern, a parapet, and the date.	II
Milnsbridge Bridge; 53.63874°N 1.82428°W		1793–98	The bridge (No. 32) carries Whiteley Street over the Huddersfield Narrow Canal. It is in stone and consists of a single depressed arch with a parapet. The bridge has been widened by the addition to the east of a flat iron span.	II
Cuckoo Bridge; 53.63894°N 1.82824°W		1793–98	The bridge (No. 33) carries Morley Lane over the Huddersfield Narrow Canal. It is in stone and consists of a single depressed skew arch. The bridge has since been widened on both sides with flat iron spans.	II
Milnsbridge Basin; 53.63863°N 1.82260°W		1793–98 (presumed)	The basin on the Huddersfield Narrow Canal is lined by stone walls with coping. It contains a cast iron post, the base of a former crane.	II
Canal milestone 53.63523°N 1.84537°W	—	1794–97	The milestone is on the towpath of the Huddersfield Narrow Canal. It consists of a rectangular stone post with a curved head and a round indented face, and is inscribed "3 miles".	II
22 Church Street, Longwood; 53.64574°N 1.83354°W	—	18th or early 19th century	A stone house in a terrace, it has a stone slate roof with coped gables on cut kneelers. There are two storeys, and the windows are mullioned. The doorway is to the left, in the ground floor is a five-light window, and the upper floor contains two three-light windows.	II
24 Church Street, Longwood; 53.64575°N 1.83363°W	—	18th or early 19th century	A stone house at the end of a terrace, it has a stone slate roof with coped gables on cut kneelers. There are two storeys, and the windows are mullioned sashes. The doorway is to the right, in the ground floor is a four-light window, and in the upper floor are two three-light windows.	II
116 Longwood Gate; 53.64841°N 1.83830°W	—	18th or early 19th century	A stone house with a stone slate roof and coped gables on kneelers. There are two storeys, and the doorway is on the right. The windows are mullioned; there is a four-light window in the ground floor and two three-light windows in the upper floor.	II
115 Side Lane; 53.64578°N 1.83715°W	—	18th or early 19th century	A stone house at the end of a terrace, it has a stone slate roof with coped gables on cut kneelers, two storeys and three bays. In the centre is a doorway and the windows are mullioned with three lights; two on the ground floor and three in the upper floor.	II
24A Ballroyd Lane; 53.64472°N 1.83146°W	—	Early 19th century	A rendered stone house with stone gutter brackets, and coped gables on cut kneelers. The gable end faces the street, there are three storeys, three bays, and most of the windows are mullioned. On the front is a central doorway with single-light windows above, the outer bays have three-light windows, and at the rear is a nine-light window.	II
16 and 18 Benn Lane; 53.64598°N 1.83942°W	—	Early 19th century	A pair of stone houses in a row, with coped gables, two storeys, and mullioned windows. The doorways are in the centre, and each house has a four-light window in the ground floor and an eight-light window in the upper floor, with some mullions removed.	II
4 Church Street, Longwood; 53.64573°N 1.83284°W	—	Early 19th century	A stone house in a terrace that has a stone slate roof with a coped gable on cut kneelers. There are two storeys, and most of the windows are mullioned. There are two three-light windows in the upper floor and one in the ground floor.	II
6 Church Street, Longwood; 53.64573°N 1.83293°W	—	Early 19th century	A rendered stone house in a terrace with a stone slate roof. There are three storeys, and the windows are mullioned. The ground floor contains out-houses, in the middle floor is a doorway and a four-light window to the left, and in the top floor are two three-light windows, the central lights higher.	II
8 Church Street, Longwood; 53.64573°N 1.83302°W	—	Early 19th century	A rendered stone house in a terrace, with a stone slate roof and coped gables on cut kneelers. There are three storeys, in the ground floor is a central doorway flanked by modern windows, and each of the upper floors contains a three-light mullioned window, the central lights higher in the top floor.	II
18 Church Street, Longwood; 53.64572°N 1.83335°W	—	Early 19th century	A stone house with a stone slate roof, two storeys, and mullioned windows. The doorway is on the right, in the ground floor is a five-light window, and in the upper floor are two three-light windows.	II
20 Church Street, Longwood; 53.64573°N 1.83344°W	—	Early 19th century	A stone house with a stone slate roof, two storeys, and mullioned windows. The doorway is on the right, and to the left is a passageway door. The windows have three lights, with one on the ground floor and two in the upper floor.	II
63 Cliffe End Road; 53.64510°N 1.82518°W	—	Early 19th century	A stone house with stone gutter brackets, and a stone slate roof. There are two storeys, and the windows are mullioned sashes. In the upper floor are a two-light and a three-light window, the ground floor has a doorway to the right, a single-light window to its left, and a three-light window further to the left.	II
118 Cowlersley Lane; 53.63488°N 1.83718°W	—	Early 19th century	A stone house at the end of a terrace, it has a stone slate roof, and two storeys. The doorway is to the right, and the windows are mullioned with sashes. In the ground floor the window has four lights, and the upper floor contains two three-light windows.	II
120 Cowlersley Lane; 53.63482°N 1.83720°W	—	Early 19th century	A stone house in a terrace that has a stone slate roof with a coped gable on cut kneelers, and two storeys. The doorway on the right is approached by steps. The windows are mullioned sashes with round arched lights. In the ground floor is a three-light window, and the upper floor contains two two-light windows.	II
122 Cowlersley Lane; 53.63479°N 1.83725°W	—	Early 19th century	A stone house in a terrace with a stone slate roof and two storeys. The doorway is on the right, and the windows are mullioned sashes. In the ground floor is a three-light window, and the upper floor contains two two-light windows.	II
124 Cowlersley Lane; 53.63476°N 1.83729°W	—	Early 19th century	A stone house in a terrace with a stone slate roof and two storeys. The doorway is on the right, and the windows are mullioned sashes. In the ground floor is a four-light window, and the upper floor contains two two-light windows.	II
126 Cowlersley Lane; 53.63472°N 1.83735°W	—	Early 19th century	A stone house in a terrace with a stone slate roof and two storeys. The doorway is on the right, and the windows are mullioned sashes with round-arched lights. In the ground floor is a four-light window, and the upper floor contains a two-light and a three-light window.	II
128 Cowlersley Lane; 53.63469°N 1.83741°W	—	Early 19th century	A stone house in a terrace with a stone slate roof and two storeys. The doorway is on the right, and the windows are mullioned sashes. In the ground floor is a four-light window, and the upper floor contains a two-light and a three-light window. The upper floor windows have round-arched lights.	II
130 and 132 Cowlersley Lane; 53.63464°N 1.83754°W	—	Early 19th century	A pair of stone houses at the end of a terrace, one of which was once a shop, they have a stone slate roof and two storeys. The doorways are to the right, one is blocked, and the windows are mullioned.	II
146–152 Cowlersley Lane; 53.63435°N 1.83815°W	—	Early 19th century	A row of four stone houses with a stone slate roof and a coped gable on cut kneelers. There are two storeys, the windows are mullioned sashes, and on No. 150 is a modern segmental bay window.	II
164–170 Cowlersley Lane; 53.63332°N 1.83905°W	—	Early 19th century	A row of four stone houses with a modern tile roof and two storeys. Most of the windows have three lights and are mullioned, with four on the ground floor and two in the upper floor, and in the upper floor is also a paired sash window.	II
8 and 8A Dowker Street; 53.64097°N 1.82494°W	—	Early 19th century	A stone house, partly rendered, with a stone slate roof. There are two storeys, and the pedimented gable end faces the street. This has three bays, a band, sash windows with stone surrounds, and a semicircular window in the tympanum.	II
20 and 22 Gilhead Road; 53.65221°N 1.84445°W	—	Early 19th century	A pair of stone houses with stone gutter brackets, and a stone slate roof with coped gables. There are three storeys, the doorways are in the centre, and the windows are mullioned. The top floor contains an eleven-light window, and in the other floors are two-light windows.	II
14 Greenhill Road; 53.65120°N 1.84323°W	—	Early 19th century	A rendered stone house in a terrace, with a stone slate roof. There are two storeys, and the doorway is to the right. The windows are mullioned, and the lights have segmental heads.	II
16 Greenhill Road; 53.65126°N 1.84332°W	—	Early 19th century	A stone house, partly rendered, it has a stone slate roof and two storeys. The windows are mullioned, and the lights have segmental heads.	II
12 Grove Street; 53.64871°N 1.84458°W	—	Early 19th century	A house at the end of a row, it is in stone with a stone slate roof, two storeys and a basement. The doorway on the right is approached by steps with railings. In the ground floor are two sash windows; the other windows are mullioned. In the basement is a three-light window, and the upper floor contains two two-light windows. The windows in the upper two floors have arched lights.	II
14 Grove Street; 53.64874°N 1.84463°W	—	Early 19th century	A stone house in a terrace, it has a stone slate roof, two storeys and a basement. The doorway on the right is approached by steps with railings, and the windows are mullioned. There are three-light windows in the basement and ground floor, and two two-light windows in the top floor.	II
20 Grove Street; 53.64883°N 1.84481°W		Early 19th century	A stone house at the end of a terrace, with a stone slate roof, three storeys, and mulliond windows. The doorway is on the right, to its left is a four-light window, and in each upper floor are two three-light windows. The windows have arched lights.	II
24 and 26 Grove Street; 53.64897°N 1.84496°W	—	Early 19th century	A pair of stone houses that have a stone slate roof with a coped gable. There are two storeys, the windows in No. 24 are sashes, and in No. 26 they are mullioned.	II
4 Lamb Hall Road; 53.65155°N 1.84414°W	—	Early 19th century	A stone house in a terrace with a stone slate roof and two storeys. The windows are a mix of mullioned and casement windows.	II
6 Lamb Hall Road; 53.65159°N 1.84419°W	—	Early 19th century	A stone house in a terrace, with a stone slate roof, two storeys, and mullioned windows. The doorway is to the right, to the left is a three-light window, and in the upper floor are a two-light and a three-light window.	II
10–14 Lamb Hall Road; 53.65170°N 1.84439°W	—	Early 19th century	A row of three houses in a terrace, they are in stone with a stone slate roof. The doorways are to the right and the windows are mullioned, each house has a four-light window in the ground floor and two three-light windows in the upper floor.	II
278–282 Leymoor Road; 53.64462°N 1.85162°W	—	Early 19th century	A terrace of three stone houses with a stone slate roof. There are two storeys, each house has a doorway with a stone surround, and the windows are mullioned, with some mullions removed.	II
169, 171, 181 and 183 Longwood Gate; 53.64939°N 1.84109°W	—	Early 19th century	Originally over-and-under dwellings, they are in stone with a stone slate roof, and have two storeys at the front and three at the rear. There are two doorways in each front, and on the street front is a blocked loading door in the upper floor. The windows are a mix; most are mullioned and some are sash or casement windows.	II
206 and 208 Longwood Gate; 53.65066°N 1.84244°W	—	Early 19th century	A pair of stone houses with a stone slate roof, catslide at the rear, and with coped gables. There are two storeys, and the windows are mullioned, with four three-light windows on the upper floor and two six-light windows on the ground floor.	II
210 and 212 Longwood Gate; 53.65074°N 1.84257°W	—	Early 19th century	A pair of rendered stone houses with stone gutter brackets, and a stone slate roof, catslide at the rear, with coped gables. There are two storeys, and the windows are mullioned, with some mullions removed.	II
10 Longwood Road; 53.64345°N 1.81468°W	—	Early 19th century	A stone house with stone gutter brackets and a stone slate roof. There is a five-light mullioned window and a sash window to the right in each floor.	II
Barn between 8 and 10 Longwood Road; 53.64370°N 1.81455°W	—	Early 19th century	A stone barn that has a stone slate roof with coped gables, and two storeys. It contains round-arched entries with voussoirs, above which is an oculus flanked by lunettes. There are lunettes in the gable ends.	II
1 Scar Top; 53.63786°N 1.84810°W	—	Early 19th century	A weaver's house in stone on a plinth with a stone slate roof. There are two storeys, a rear outshut, and a single-storey extension to the right. The windows are mullioned, in the ground floor is a seven-light window, and the upper floor contains an eight-light window.	II
32 Side Lane; 53.64554°N 1.83831°W	—	Early 19th century	A stone house that has a stone slate roof with coped gables on cut kneelers. There are two storeys, and the windows are mullioned, with some mullions removed.	II
91 Thornhill Road; 53.64547°N 1.83141°W	—	Early 19th century	A stone house that has a stone slate roof with a coped gable on cut kneelers. There are two storeys, and it contains a range of four-light mullioned sash windows.	II
Factory adjacent to Bankfield; 53.63457°N 1.84724°W		Early 19th century	A former weaving factory in stone with stone gutter brackets, and a stone slate roof with a coped gable on the west. There are three storeys and a basement on the south. The windows are mullioned, including a 13-light window on the south front, where the doorway is approached by stone steps with railings. In the west gable end is a loading door on each floor.	II
Upper Snow Lee Farmhouse and Cherry Tree Cottage; 53.65601°N 1.85235°W	—	Early 19th century	Originally a laithe house, it is in stone with a stone slate roof and two storeys. The windows are mullioned, and in the former barn are round-arched entries and two semicircular lunettes.	II
St John's Church; 53.63896°N 1.85528°W		1828–29	A Commissioners' church designed by Peter Atkinson, jnr in Early English style, it is built in stone with a slate roof. The chancel was added in 1862–66, and the church was restored in 1885. The church consists of a nave, a south porch, a chancel, and a west steeple with a square tower and a broach spire with lucarnes. The windows are lancets, and inside the church there are galleries on three sides.	II
71–73 Brook Lane; 53.63658°N 1.85629°W	—	Early to mid 19th century	A stone weaver's house with stone gutter brackets, and a stone slate roof with coped gables. There are three storeys on the front, with the lower two storeys built back to earth. In the centre is a doorway with a stone surround and tie-stones, and the windows are mullioned, including a twelve-light window in the top floor.	II
17–25 Clay Well; 53.63772°N 1.85525°W	—	Early to mid 19th century	A terrace of five stone cottages with a stone slate roof and coped gables. There are two storeys, and the windows are mullioned, with some mullions removed, and some lights blocked. At the rear is a blocked loading door.	II
77 and 79 Handel Street; 53.63748°N 1.85202°W	—	Early to mid 19th century	A pair of stone weavers' houses with stone gutter brackets, and a stone slate roof with coped gables. There are three storeys and the windows are mullioned. In the ground floor they have three or four lights, in the upper two floors they have eleven lights, and some of the lights are arched.	II
88 Handel Street; 53.63767°N 1.85289°W	—	Early to mid 19th century	A weaver's house in stone, with stone gutter brackets, and a stone slate roof with a coped gable and kneelers. There are three storeys, and the windows are mullioned. In the ground floor is a central doorway flanked by three-light windows, and in each of the upper floors is a three-light and a six-light window.	II
24 James Street; 53.63764°N 1.84916°W	—	Early to mid 19th century	A stone house in a terrace, it has a stone slate roof, three storeys at the front and two at the rear, and the windows are mullioned. The doorway is to the right, in the ground floor is a four-light window, the middle floor contains two three-light windows, and in the top floor is a seven-light window.	II
26 James Street; 53.63762°N 1.84927°W	—	Early to mid 19th century	A stone house in a terrace, it has a stone slate roof, three storeys at the front and two at the rear, and the windows are mullioned. The doorway is near the centre, some mullions have been removed from the windows, some lights have been blocked, and there is a ten-light window at the rear.	II
1–3 Kiln Brow; 53.63776°N 1.84771°W	—	Early to mid 19th century	A row of three stone houses that have a stone slate roof with a coped west gable, and two storeys. There are two original doorways, one blocked, and an inserted doorway. The windows are mullioned, and include an eight-light window.	II
30 Lamb Hall Road; 53.65214°N 1.84544°W	—	Early to mid 19th century	A coach house converted for residential use, it is in stone and has a stone slate roof with coped gables. There are three storeys, four bays, and the gable end faces the road. In the ground floor are two semicircular arches, the windows are modern replacements, and in the gable end is an oculus with keystones.	II
Barn, 63 Lamb Hall Road; 53.65434°N 1.84963°W	—	Early to mid 19th century	A stone barn with stone gutter brackets, and a stone slate roof with a coped gable. There is one storey, and the barn contains segmental-headed barn doors with concentric voussoirs. In the west gable end is a lunette, and in 1909 decorative cresting was added to the east gable.	II
89 and 91 Lamb Hall Road; 53.65566°N 1.85148°W	—	Early to mid 19th century	A stone house with a sill band, stone gutter brackets, and a stone slate roof with a coped gable. There are two storeys, one single-light window, and the other windows are four-light mullioned sashes. At the west end a two-storey barn extends to the south, and contains blocked doorways with segmental heads, and two lunettes.	II
434–440 Leymoor Road; 53.64128°N 1.85498°W	—	Early to mid 19th century	A terrace of four houses in stone with a string course, stone gutter brackets, and a stone slate roof with coped gables. There are two storeys and four doorways with stone surrounds. The windows are mullioned, with some mullions removed, and some lights blocked.	II
474 Leymoor Road; 53.64044°N 1.85594°W	—	Early to mid 19th century	A stone cottage, rendered on the side, with a coped gable to the northwest. There are two storeys and the windows are mullioned. The doorway is to the left, to the right is a four-light window with two mullions removed, in the upper floor is an eight-light window, and at the rear are a two-light and a three-light window.	II
7 Long Croft Street; 53.63603°N 1.84889°W	—	Early to mid 19th century	A stone house in a terrace with a stone slate roof. There are two storeys and the windows are mullioned. In the ground floor is a doorway with a stone surround to the right, and a four light window, in the upper floor is a seven-light window, and at the rear is a six-light window with two lights blocked.	II
9 Long Croft Street; 53.63605°N 1.84882°W	—	Early to mid 19th century	A stone house in a terrace with a stone slate roof and two storeys. In the ground floor is a doorway and a modern casement window, and the upper floor contains a four-light mullioned window.	II
11 Long Croft Street; 53.63608°N 1.84875°W	—	Early to mid 19th century	A house in a terrace, it is in stone with a stone slate roof, two storeys and a rear extension. The doorway has a stone surround and a fanlight, and the windows are mullioned, including a seven-light window in the upper floor.	II
13 Long Croft Street; 53.63609°N 1.84864°W	—	Early to mid 19th century	A stone house on a plinth, with a stone slate roof and a coped gable. There are two storeys and an attic, and the gable end faces the street. Steps with railings lead up to a doorway with a stone surround. The windows are mullioned, with some lights blocked, and in the attic is a single-light window.	II
1 Long Croft Yard; 53.63614°N 1.84868°W	—	Early to mid 19th century	The house is in stone with a stone slate roof, and two storeys. The doorway has a stone surround, and the windows are mullioned. In the ground floor is a six-light window, and the upper floor contains a five-light and a three-light window.	II
2 Long Croft Yard; 53.63618°N 1.84872°W	—	Early to mid 19th century	A stone house with a stone slate roof, a coped north gable, and two storeys. The doorway has a stone surround, and the windows are mullioned, with some mullions removed.	II
67 and 69 Lower Gate; 53.64230°N 1.81557°W	—	Early to mid 19th century	A pair of houses with stone gutter brackets, and a stone slate roof with coped gables. There are two storeys, and the windows are a mix of sash and mullioned windows.	II
46 Myrtle Road; 53.63698°N 1.85144°W	—	Early to mid 19th century	A stone house with stone gutter brackets, and a stone slate roof with a coped gable on cut kneelers to the south. There are three storeys at the front and two at the rear. The windows are mullioned, and some lights have been blocked.	II
2–12 Parkwood Road; 53.64782°N 1.84796°W	—	Early to mid 19th century	A terrace of six houses in three stepped groups of two. They are in stone, with stone eaves brackets on a string course, and stone slate roofs with coped gables. There are two storeys, and the windows are mullioned. Each house has a doorway to the right, a three-light window in the ground floor, and two three-light windows in the upper floor. In front of the houses are stone walls with rounded copings and gate posts with rounded tops.	II
14 and 16 Parkwood Road; 53.64755°N 1.84881°W	—	Early to mid 19th century	Originally back-to-back houses, they are in stone, partly rendered, with a sill band, paired gutter brackets, and a stone slate roof with coped gables on moulded kneelers. There are two storeys on the south front and three on the north front. Most of the windows are mullioned, and there are some casement windows.	II
12 Scar Bottom; 53.63856°N 1.83819°W	—	Early to mid 19th century	A stone house with stone gutter brackets, a stone slate roof, two storeys, and mullioned windows. In the ground floor is a three-light window, and the upper floor contains a four-light window.	II
14 Scar Bottom; 53.63854°N 1.83832°W	—	Early to mid 19th century	A stone house with stone gutter brackets, a stone slate roof, two storeys, and mullioned windows. In the ground floor is a three-light window, and the upper floor contains a four-light window.	II
16 Scar Bottom; 53.63855°N 1.83846°W	—	Early to mid 19th century	A stone house with stone gutter brackets, a stone slate roof, two storeys, and mullioned sash windows. In the ground floor is a six-light window, and the upper floor contains an eight-light window with two blocked lights.	II
18 Scar Bottom; 53.63858°N 1.83869°W	—	Early to mid 19th century	A stone house with stone gutter brackets, a stone slate roof and two storeys. In the upper floor is a seven-light mullioned window with two blocked lights, and the ground floor contains a tripartite sash window.	II
6–7 Scar Top; 53.63800°N 1.84760°W	—	Early to mid 19th century	A pair of mirror-image stone weavers' houses, they have stone gutter brackets, and a stone slate roof with a coped east gable. There are two storeys and the windows are mullioned. Each house has in the ground floor, a doorway with a stone surround and tie-stones, a three-light and a four-light window, and in the upper floor a ten-light window.	II
11–12 Scar Top; 53.63807°N 1.84710°W	—	Early to mid 19th century	A pair of stone weavers' houses, they have a stone slate roof with a coped east gable. There are two storeys, and the doorways to the left have stone surrounds and tie-stones. The windows are mullioned, and each house has a four-light window in the ground floor and a seven-light window in the upper floor.	II
13–14 Scar Top; 53.63816°N 1.84691°W	—	Early to mid 19th century	A pair of stone weavers' houses with bracketed gutters, and a stone slate roof and coped gables. There are two storeys and an attic, and the windows are mullioned. On the south front each house has a doorway on the left with a stone surround and tie-stones, a four-light window in the ground floor and an eight-light window in the upper floor. In the east gable end is a three-light window and a single-light attic window. The north front has one storey, two doorways and a single-light window.	II
1–5 Scarhouse Lane; 53.63610°N 1.84929°W	—	Early to mid 19th century	A terrace of three stone houses that have stone slate roofs with coped gables. There are two storeys, and each house has a doorway to the right. The windows on the front are mullioned, in the ground floor some mullions have been removed, the upper floor contains six three-light windows, and at the rear are modern casement windows.	II
23 Scarhouse Lane; 53.63658°N 1.84961°W	—	Early to mid 19th century	A former weaver's house in a terrace, it is in stone, and has a stone slate roof with coped gables. There are three storeys on the front and two at the rear, the doorway has a stone surround, and the windows are mullioned.	II
25 and 27 Scarhouse Lane; 53.63655°N 1.84978°W	—	Early to mid 19th century	A pair of stone weavers' houses in a terrace, they have a stone slate roof. There are two storeys, on the front are two doorways with stone surrounds, and the windows are mullioned, some of the lights have arched heads.	II
29 Scarhouse Lane; 53.63654°N 1.84981°W	—	Early to mid 19th century	A former weaver's house in a terrace, it is in stone and has a stone slate roof. There are two storeys, the doorway has a stone surround, and the windows are mullioned, with some mullions removed.	II
31 Scarhouse Lane; 53.63653°N 1.84990°W	—	Early to mid 19th century	A former weaver's house in a terrace, it is in stone and has a stone slate roof. There are two storeys, the doorway has a stone surround, and the windows are mullioned. In the ground floor is a four-light window, and the upper floor contains two three-light windows.	II
79–83 Station Road; 53.63579°N 1.85036°W	—	Early to mid 19th century	A terrace of three stone houses with a stone slate roof. There are two storeys and the windows are mullioned. On the front are three doorways with stone surrounds and another doorway converted into a window. The windows have two or three lights, and one mullion has been removed.	II
1 and 3 Town End; 53.63885°N 1.85643°W		Early to mid 19th century	A pair of weavers' houses in stone that have a stone slate roof with a coped gable on moulded kneelers, and three storeys. All the windows are mullioned, with some mullions removed, and some lights blocked. All the windows in the east front have round-arched lights, and in the top floor are two nine-light windows.	II
4 and 6 West End Road; 53.63843°N 1.85741°W	—	Early to mid 19th century	A pair of stone weavers' houses with stone gutter brackets, and a stone slate roof with a coped gable to the east. There are three storeys on the front and two at the rear, and the windows are mullioned. On the front each house has a central doorway, two four-light windows on the ground floor and an eleven-light window on each of the upper floors. At the rear are more mullioned windows, and two loading doors converted into windows.	II
Dolfield; 53.65042°N 1.84319°W	—	Early to mid 19th century	A stone house with stone gutter brackets, and a stone slate roof with coped gables on cut kneelers. There are two storeys, and the house is in two parts. The east part has a belt course, three bays, a central doorway, and sash windows, and in the west part is an eight-light mullioned window in the upper floor and modern windows in the ground floor.	II
Longwood Edge Farm House; 53.65435°N 1.84963°W	—	Early to mid 19th century	The farmhouse is in stone with a sill band, stone gutter brackets, and a stone slate roof. There are three storeys, in the top floor are four three-light mullioned windows, and the lower floors contain modern replaced windows.	II
Barn, Lower Hirst Farm; 53.65675°N 1.85895°W	—	Early to mid 19th century	A stone barn that has a stone slate roof with coped gables. It contains segment-headed barn doors, and two rows of six segment-headed ventilation slits on each side.	II
Block, Burdett Mill; 53.63864°N 1.81914°W		1838	The former mill, converted for residential use, is in stone. There are mainly four storeys, with five at the east end. On the front are 19 bays, with one bay of loading doors, and a projecting stair tower surmounted by a cast iron water tank.	II
54, 54A, 56 and 58 Brook Lane; 53.63688°N 1.85657°W	—	1843	A group of back-to-back houses in stone, partly rendered, with stone gutter brackets, and a stone slate roof with a coped gable. There are two storeys, a basement and an attic. The doorways have stone surrounds, one has a cornice, and the windows are mullioned. In the northeast gable attic is a Venetian window, and in the southwest gable apex is an inscribed and dated plaque.	II
22 and 24 Cliffe Ash; 53.63870°N 1.85653°W		1845	A pair of weaver's houses converted to form part of Colne Valley Museum. They are in stone with sill bands, stone gutter brackets, and a stone slate roof. There are three storeys, the entrance is on the south front, and most of the windows are mullioned, with some mullions removed.	II
26 and 28 Cliffe Ash; 53.63870°N 1.85669°W		c. 1845	A pair of weaver's houses converted to form part of Colne Valley Museum. They are in stone, with sill bands, stone gutter brackets, and a stone slate roof with coped gables. There are three storeys at the front and one at the rear. The windows are mullioned, with some mullions removed, and include two eight-light windows.	II
Golcar Railway Viaduct; 53.63349°N 1.85154°W	—	c. 1845	A viaduct parallel to the original was built in about 1890. Both viaducts are in stone, and consist of four semicircular arches with brick vaults. The viaducts have rusticated dressings, string courses, and coped parapets.	II
St Luke's Church, Milnsbridge; 53.63716°N 1.82207°W		1845	The church was designed by William Wallen in Neo-Norman style, and is now redundant. It is built in sandstone with freestone dressings and a slate roof. The church consists of a nave and an apsidal chancel. The openings are round-headed, and the windows have colonnettes with scalloped capitals, and an impost band carried over the windows as a hood mould. Above the south doorway is a sculpture in high relief.	II
St Luke's Vicarage; 53.63693°N 1.82315°W	—	1845	The former vicarage is in stone with a band, and a hipped slate roof, and is in Neo-Norman style. There are two storeys, and a symmetrical front of three bays. The central round-arched doorway has a moulded surround, colonnettes with Norman capitals, and hood moulds with semi-circular scalloped edges. The windows are paired round-arched sashes set in arched recesses.	II
Longwood Railway Viaduct; 53.64164°N 1.83024°W		1845–49	The railway viaduct is in stone, and consists of 20 round arches carried on tapering piers. The viaduct has imposts, a band, and a parapet.	II
27 and 29 Clay Well and factory building 53.63782°N 1.85551°W		Mid 19th century	A factory building and warehouse incorporating living accommodation, it is in stone with stone gutter brackets, a stone slate roof with coped gables, and there are three storeys. The houses have two-light windows on the front, and in the gable end facing the road are two loading doors. The factory to the right has a carriage entrance, in the middle floor are three small semicircular windows, and the top floor contains industrial casement windows. At the rear of the houses are mullioned windows.	II
1 Cliffe Ash; 53.63864°N 1.85613°W	—	Mid 19th century	A stone house with a sill band and a stone slate roof with a coped east gable. There are two storeys and a basement, and on the south front is a loading door approached by a ramp with iron railings. The windows are mullioned, some mullions have been removed and some lights are blocked, and on the south front is a 16-light window.	II
2–3 Cliffe Ash; 53.63863°N 1.85633°W		Mid 19th century	A pair of stone houses with stone gutter brackets, and a stone slate roof with a coped east gable. There are two storeys at the front and three at the rear. On the front are doorways with former loading doors above, and steps with railings lead up to the doorway in the upper floor of No. 2. On the front is a five-light mullioned window in each floor, and at the rear are single-light windows.	II
40 and 42 Dodlee Lane; 53.64961°N 1.84510°W	—	Mid 19th century	A pair of mirror-image stone houses with a sill band, stone gutter brackets, and a stone slate roof with coped gables. There are two storeys, and the windows are mullioned. Each house has a doorway in the outer part, a three-light window in the ground floor, and two three-light windows in the upper floor.	II
2–8 Greenhill Road; 53.65101°N 1.84310°W	—	Mid 19th century	A terrace of four stone houses with a band, stone gutter brackets, and a stone slate roof with coped gables. There are two storeys, and the windows are mullioned, with some mullions removed.	II
76 and 78 Handel Street and 21 Rock Fold; 53.63763°N 1.85237°W	—	Mid 19th century	A pair of weavers' houses with stone gutter brackets, and a stone slate roof with a coped gable to the west. There are three storeys at the front and one at the rear, and the windows are mullioned. In the ground floor each house has a doorway and a two-light windows, and in the upper floors are six-light windows.	II
80 and 82 Handel Street; 53.63767°N 1.85252°W	—	Mid 19th century	A pair of stone houses with stone gutter brackets, and a stone slate roof with a coped gable. There are two storeys and the windows are mullioned. Each house has a doorway with a stone surround to the right, in the ground floor are a three-light and a four light window, and the upper floor contains a five-light and a six-light window.	II
84 and 86 Handel Street; 53.63765°N 1.85272°W	—	Mid 19th century	A pair of weavers' houses in stone, with stone gutter brackets and a stone slate roof. There are two storeys, and the windows are mullioned, including a ten-light window in the upper floor.	II
90 Handel Street; 53.63770°N 1.85299°W	—	Mid 19th century	A stone weaver's house with sill bands, stone gutter brackets, a stone slate roof with a coped gable, and mullioned windows. In the ground floor is a doorway with a stone surround, and a four-light window to the right. The middle floor contains an eight-light window with two lights blocked, and in the top floor is an eight-light window.	II
20 James Street; 53.63772°N 1.84902°W	—	Mid 19th century	A stone house in a terrace, with stone gutter brackets, and a stone slate roof. There are two storeys, and a rear outshut. The doorway on the front is to the left, most of the windows are mullioned, and at the rear is one sash window.	II
22 James Street; 53.63767°N 1.84909°W	—	Mid 19th century	A stone house in a terrace, with stone gutter brackets, and a stone slate roof. There are two storeys, and the windows are mullioned. The doorway is in the near-centre, in the ground floor are a four-light and a three-light window, and the upper floor contains three three-light windows. In front of the garden are iron railings with finials.	II
86–90 James Street; 53.63720°N 1.85200°W	—	Mid 19th century	A terrace of three stone houses, partly rendered, with stone gutter brackets, and a roof of stone slate and tiles with a coped gable and kneelers. There are two storeys, and a rear extension with a catslide roof. The windows are mullioned, with some lights blocked, and include a 14-light window in the upper floor.	II
94 and 96 James Street; 53.63702°N 1.85235°W	—	Mid 19th century	Two houses at the end of a row, they are in stone, with moulded stone gutter brackets, one has a pantile roof, the other a roof of concrete tiles. There are two storeys, and most of the windows are mullioned. In the upper floor each house has an eight-light window, and at the rear are two modern casement windows.	II
4–5 Kiln Row; 53.63777°N 1.8475°W	—	Mid 19th century	A pair of stone houses at the end of a terrace, with stone gutter brackets and a stone slate roof. There is one storey, and the windows are mullioned, some with round-arched lights.	II
16 Lamb Hall Road; 53.65176°N 1.84451°W	—	Mid 19th century	A stone house at the end of a terrace, it has a stone slate roof, two storeys, and mullioned windows. In the ground floor is a three-light window, and the upper floor contains two two-light windows.	II
20 Lamb Hall Road; 53.65183°N 1.84470°W	—	Mid 19th century	A stone house at the end of a row, it has stone gutter brackets, a stone slate roof, two storeys, and mullioned windows. The doorway is to the right, to its left is a two-light window, and in the upper floor is a five-light window, the middle light blocked.	II
22 and 24 Lamb Hall Road; 53.65189°N 1.84480°W	—	Mid 19th century	A pair of stone houses with stone gutter brackets, a stone slate roof, two storeys, and mullioned sash windows. The doorways are to the right, in the ground floor of each house is a two-light window, and in the upper floor a five-light window.	II
28 Lamb Hall Road; 53.65215°N 1.84511°W	—	Mid 19th century	A detached stone house with a moulded eaves cornice and blocking course, and a hipped stone slate roof. There are two storeys and three bays. The central doorway has a cornice with cresting on decorative consoles. To the left is a later canted bay window, and the other windows are sashes with moulded surrounds.	II
Drinking trough opposite 63 Lamb Hall Road; 53.65452°N 1.84965°W	—	19th century (or earlier)	The stone drinking trough is in a segmental-headed recess in a dry stone wall. It is surrounded by flagstones, and outside them are stone setts.	II
Coach house, 86 Lamb Hall Road; 53.65413°N 1.84905°W	—	Mid 19th century	The coach house is in stone with a modillion eaves cornice and a hipped slate roof. There is one storey, and in the front facing the road is a central pediment, the tympanum containing an oculus with a moulded surround. Below is a round-arched window with imposts and a keystone.	II
88 Lamb Hall Road; 53.65432°N 1.84916°W	—	Mid 19th century	A stone house with quoins, a sill band, and a stone slate roof with coped gables on cut kneelers. There are two storeys, three bays, a central doorway, and sash windows.	II
Wall, 88 Lamb Hall Road; 53.65422°N 1.84923°W	—	Mid 19th century (presumed}	The retaining wall in front of the house is in stone. It is coped, and has piers with ogee caps. The cast iron railings have spear and urn finials.	II
338–342 Leymoor Road; 53.64416°N 1.85394°W	—	Mid 19th century	A terrace of three stone houses with a sill band, roofs of Welsh slate and stone slate, and a coped west gable. On the front are three doorways with stone surrounds, and the windows are mullioned, with some mullions removed.	II
448 and 450 Leymoor Road; 53.64114°N 1.85543°W	—	Mid 19th century	A pair of stone houses with a sill band, stone gutter brackets, and a stone slate roof with coped gables. There are two storeys and a later single-storey extension at the rear. The doorways have stone surrounds and tie-stones, and the windows are mullioned, with some blocked lights.	II
470 Leymoor Road; 53.64051°N 1.85574°W	—	Mid 19th century	A pair of mirror-image weavers' houses in stone, with stone gutter brackets, and a stone slate roof with coped gables. There are three storeys, the doorways are in the outer part, and the windows are mullioned. Each house has a three-light window in the ground floor, and a six-light window in each of the upper floors.	II
42–46 Longwood Gate; 53.64760°N 1.83559°W	—	Mid 19th century	A row of stone houses with a moulded eaves cornice and blocking course, and a hipped stone slate roof. There are two storeys and seven bays. The doorways have rectangular fanlights, Tuscan pilasters, and full entablatures, and the windows are sashes.	II
Gatepiers, 42–46 Longwood Gate; 53.64753°N 1.83579°W	—	Mid 19th century	The gate piers are in stone and are panelled. They have vermiculated semicircular caps.	II
183A Longwood Gate; 53.64945°N 1.84122°W	—	Mid 19th century	A stone house with a moulded eaves cornice, and a stone slate roof with coped gables. The doorway to the left has a plain raised surround and a moulded cornice, to the right is a sash window, and there are two sash windows in the upper floor.	II
3–4 Mount Pleasant; 53.63789°N 1.85258°W	—	Mid 19th century	A pair of stone houses with stone gutter brackets, and a stone slate roof with coped gables and moulded kneelers. There are three storeys, the lower two storeys back to earth. On the south front are mullioned windows with some mullions removed, and the north front contains a doorway with a stone surround.	II
2 Rock Fold; 53.63785°N 1.85089°W	—	Mid 19th century	A stone house with a stone slate roof and a coped gable on the west side. There are two storeys, and a lean-to extension to the east. The windows are mullioned, with a four-light window in the ground floor of the main part, two three-light windows in the upper floor, and a two-light window in the extension.	II
3–4 Scar Top; 53.63794°N 1.84791°W	—	Mid 19th century	A pair of stone weavers' houses with stone gutter brackets, and a stone slate roof. There are two storeys at the front and one at the rear, and the windows are mullioned. The doorways are to the right and have stone surrounds and tie-stones; the door on the left has a later porch. In the ground floor are two four-light windows, and the upper floor contains a seven- and a six-light window.	II
5 Scar Top; 53.63796°N 1.84776°W	—	Mid 19th century	A stone house in a terrace, with stone gutter brackets, and a stone slate roof. There are two storeys, the central doorway has a stone surround and tie-stones, and the windows are mullioned, with some mullions removed.	II
10 Scar Top; 53.63803°N 1.84720°W	—	Mid 19th century	A stone house at the end of a row, it has a stone slate roof and a coped west gable. There are two storeys, and the doorway is to the left with a stone surround and tie-stones. The windows are mullioned, and some mullions have been removed.	II
26–30 Swallow Lane; 53.64068°N 1.85683°W	—	Mid 19th century	A row of three stone houses with a string course, moulded gutter brackets, and a stone slate roof with coped gables. The windows are mullioned, each house has a doorway to the right, a four-light window to the left, and two three-light windows in the upper floor. At the rear, one house has an inserted bow window.	II
27 and 29 Town End; 53.63918°N 1.85641°W	—	Mid 19th century	A pair of stone weavers' houses with stone gutter brackets, and a stone slate roof with a coped south gable. There are two storeys, and the windows are mullioned. Each house has a doorway with a stone surround to the left, the left house has a modern porch, there is a four-light window to the right and a six-light window in each upper floor. At the rear is a single-storey extension, a three-light window in each ground floor, and a six-light window in each upper floor.	II
3 Victoria Lane; 53.63833°N 1.85693°W	—	Mid 19th century	A stone weaver's house with stone gutter brackets, and a stone slate roof with coped gables. There are two storeys at the front and three at the rear, and the windows are mullioned. In the centre of the front is a doorway, with a four-light window to the left and a three light window to the right, and in the upper floor is a 13-light window. At the rear are string courses, and the top floor contains a twelve-light window.	II
Columnar monument 53.64596°N 1.83224°W	—	Mid 19th century	The monument is in the cemetery associated with St Mark's Church. It is in stone, and consists of a tall Tuscan column on a plinth.	II
Gate piers, Fernleigh; 53.64349°N 1.83055°W	—	Mid 19th century	The two pairs of gate piers at the entrance to the drive are in stone. Each pier has a square base, and becomes octagonal as it rises, it contains blind traceried panelling, and is surmounted by a pyramidal finial. Between the outer piers are quadrant flanking walls with pierced quatrefoils.	II
Wall, and steps to terrace, Fernleigh; 53.64448°N 1.82964°W	—	Mid 19th century	The retaining wall and the walls flanking the flight of steps are in stone with moulded coping and balustrades pierced with quatrefoils. The walls contain chamfered piers, some with moulded caps.	II
Holmefield; 53.64995°N 1.84797°W	—	Mid 19th century	A large stone house with rusticated quoins, a moulded eaves cornice, and a hipped slate roof. There are two storeys and a front of three bays. In the centre is a doorway with pilasters, an entablature and side lights, which is flanked by two-storey canted bay windows with Tuscan piers and entablatures. Above the doorway are round-arched sash windows, each with moulded imposts, voussoirs, a keystone, and a cornice. On the south front are Italianate features, a three-storey tower with a balustraded parapet and balconies, and a tripartite round-arched stair window containing stained glass.	II
Gate piers, Holmefield; 53.64936°N 1.84813°W	—	Mid 19th century	There are two pairs of gate piers flanking the main entrance to the drive and the two pedestrian entrances. They are in stone, each contains moulded panels, and has an elaborate bracketed cornice. Outside the piers are quadrant walls with moulded coping.	II
Rising Sun Public House; 53.64103°N 1.85568°W		Mid 19th century	A weaver's house, later a public house, it is in stone, with a sill band, stone gutter brackets, and a stone slate roof with coped gables. There are two storeys and a lower extension to the left. The doorway has pilasters, an entablature and a blocking course, and the windows are mullioned. At the rear is a blocked loading door and an eleven-light window.	II
Main block, Royds Hall School; 53.64488°N 1.81692°W	—	Mid 19th century	A house, later part of a school, it is in stone with bands, rusticated angle pilasters, a moulded eaves cornice on consoles, a hipped slate roof, and there are two storeys. The porch is over five steps and has Composite pilasters, a full entablature and a pierced balustrade. On the sides are arcades of three semicircular arches with moulded voussoirs on pink granite colonnettes with Composite capitals. Above the porch is a round-headed window with carved imposts, moulded voussoirs, and ornamental cresting, and over this is a pyramidal roof. The windows are sashes, in the upper floor they have segmental heads, and in the ground they have flat heads and aprons; two of them are paired and separated by Corinthian columns.	II
Snow Lee; 53.65650°N 1.85256°W	—	Mid 19th century	A stone house with stone gutter brackets, a stone slate roof, and two storeys. In the upper floor is a 14-light mullioned sash window.	II
Storth House; 53.63379°N 1.83889°W	—	Mid 19th century	A stone house with a sill band, a moulded eaves cornice and a blocking course, and a slate roof with coped gables. There are two storeys and three bays. The central doorway has Tuscan half-columns, an entablature and a blocking course, and it is flanked by canted bay windows with moulded cornices and parapets. The windows in the upper floor are sashes.	II
Row of tenter posts 53.64925°N 1.83891°W	—	19th century (probable)	A row of five tenter posts, they consist of monolithic stone poles with a rectangular plan, each with a socket for an iron hook.	II
Upper Snow Lea Farm; 53.65676°N 1.85330°W	—	Mid 19th century	A house and attached barn in stone, with stone gutter brackets and a stone slate roof. The house has two storeys, and the windows are mullioned. The barn to the east contains round-arched barn doors.	II
Parkwood Mill; 53.64787°N 1.84417°W		Early 1850s	A group of woollen mills built between the early 1850s and 1882. They are in gritstone with roofs of slate and stone slate, and some have sill bands and dentilled eaves. They consist of eight buildings, including mills, some with stair towers, engine houses, boiler houses, chimneys, stores, and a two-storey office block in Gothic style.	II
Blocks and tower, Union Mills; 53.63888°N 1.81985°W		1861	The two blocks from the former mill, converted for residential use, and the tower, are in stone, and have slate roofs with coped gables on kneelers. The blocks have five storeys, the block along Factory Street has 19 bays, and the block along the canal has 14 bays. There is a three-storey engine house to the west with an iron water tank on the roof. The tower in the angle between the blocks has a pyramidal roof, a bracketed eaves cornice, an oculus, and round-arched windows with imposts and keystones on each side.	II
Former Church of England School; 53.63800°N 1.85228°W		1864	The school, later converted for residential use, is in stone, with rusticated quoins, moulded gutter brackets, and a slate roof with coped gables, moulded kneelers, and ball and spike finials. It consists of a single-storey seven-bay range, with a single-storey wing to the left and a two-storey wing to the right. In the centre is a gabled porch with an arched entrance, the flanking windows have arched heads and contain Y-tracery, and elsewhere are mullioned and transomed windows.	II
Gates and gatepiers, opposite Longwood Methodist Church; 53.65242°N 1.84620°W	—	Mid to late 19th century	The pair of gate piers at the entrance to the cemetery are in stone, they contain panels with trefoil pointed heads, and have conical caps. Between them are elaborate cast iron gates.	II
Gates and gatepiers, Longwood Methodist Church; 53.65218°N 1.84605°W	—	Mid to late 19th century	The pair of gate piers at the entrance to the churchyard are in stone, they contain panels with trefoil pointed heads, and have conical caps. Between them are elaborate cast iron gates.	II
Parkwood Methodist Church; 53.64860°N 1.84572°W		1868	The church is in stone with stone gutter brackets, a grey slate roof, hipped to the north, and there are two storeys. The entrance front is gabled and flanked by buttresses with moulded heads. In the centre, steps lead up to a doorway with a semicircular fanlight, pilasters, and a full entablature. Surrounding the doorway is a full overarch, it is flanked by tall round-arched windows with hood moulds, and above is an arched band inscribed with the name of the church. Along the sides of the church are casement windows in the lower storey, and round-headed windows in the upper storey.	II
Gates, gatepiers and railings, Parkwood Methodist Church; 53.64843°N 1.84554°W	—	1868	At the entrance to the churchyard is a pair of square stone gate piers with moulded caps, and between them are iron gates. Enclosing the churchyard are dwarf stone walls with copings and iron railings.	II
St Mark's Church, Longwood; 53.64622°N 1.83326°W		1876–77	The chancel was added to the church in 1882, and the tower in 1914. The church is built in sandstone with a roof of Westmorland slate. It consists of a nave with a clerestory, north and south aisles, a northwest porch, a chancel with a north organ chamber and a south vestry, and a southwest tower. The tower has three stages, diagonal buttresses, an east doorway with a moulded surround, a corbel table, and an embattled parapet with corner pinnacles. On the wall of the south aisle is a sundial moved from another site.	II
Gates, St Mark's Churchyard, 53.64609°N 1.83271°W	—	1876–77 (presumed)	At the entrance to the churchyard are a pair of stone gate piers. They are chamfered, and have geometrical decoration and comical caps. Between them are elaborate cast iron gates and an overthrow.	II
Golcar Providence Methodist Church; 53.63855°N 1.84964°W		1884	The church is in stone with a belt course and a cornice between the floors, a slate roof, and two storeys. The entrance front has five bays, with a pediment containing a clock over the middle three bays. The front is surmounted by a parapet and five urns, and flanked by clasping corner pilasters. In the ground floor is a round-headed window in each of the middle and outer bays, and in the other two bays are doorways with round-headed fanlights. Between the floors is a moulded cornice, and the upper floor contains five round-headed windows, each with a blind balustrade. Above the middle three windows is inscribed the name of the church.	II
Gate piers, Golcar Providence Methodist Church; 53.63827°N 1.84949°W	—	c. 1884	The gate piers at the entrance to the churchyard are in stone, they are panelled, and have volute caps. Between them is a wrought iron overthrow.	II
