= Milnsbridge =

District of Huddersfield in West Yorkshire, England

Coordinates: 53.641288°N 1.826171°W

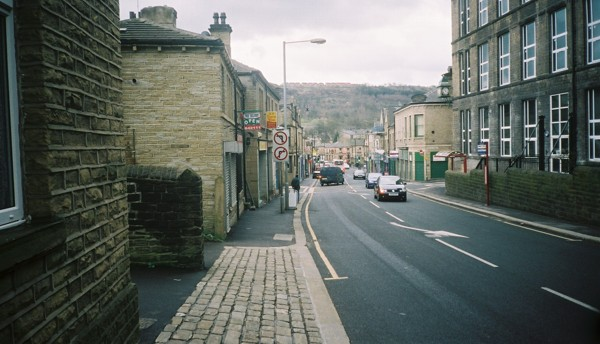
- Market Street, Milnsbridge

- Location within West Yorkshire
- OS grid reference: SE115161
  - London: 160 mi (260 km) SSE
- Metropolitan borough: Kirklees
- Metropolitan county: West Yorkshire
- Region: Yorkshire and the Humber
- Country: England
- Sovereign state: United Kingdom
- Post town: HUDDERSFIELD
- Postcode district: HD3
- Dialling code: 01484
- Police: West Yorkshire
- Fire: West Yorkshire
- Ambulance: Yorkshire
- UK Parliament: Colne Valley

Milnsbridge is a district of Huddersfield, West Yorkshire, England, situated 2 miles (3 km) west of the town centre, and in the Colne Valley. The name is said to have derived from the water-powered mill and the bridge that stood alongside it in the 13th century.

The Huddersfield Narrow Canal runs through Milnsbridge close to the River Colne. A viaduct carries the trans-Pennine Huddersfield Line railway that runs through Milnsbridge, and links Leeds and Manchester via Huddersfield. The Huddersfield to Manchester road route A62 passes Milnsbridge along the south side of the valley.

== History ==
Until recent times Milnsbridge was mostly centred on the woollen and worsted yarn textile industry, with mills situated along the riverside. These formerly relied on the river and the canal.

In the late 19th century Joseph Stoner Crowther and two of his sons moved from Marsden, West Yorkshire down the Colne Valley to Milnsbridge after purchasing two mills, where they began the successful production of woollen cloth. On Wednesday, 24th June 1931 Joseph Crowther and Sons broke the world record (then six hours and four minutes) for making a suit from sheep to wearer. The event was held in partnership with Leeds' tailors Prices Ltd. The task was completed in two hours and ten minutes, setting a new world record.

Union Mills, formerly home to John Crowther and Sons, is a mid-19th-century Grade II listed building. Part of the mill, christened Crowther Village, was converted into 38 residential flats and was completed in 1997.

The Scar Lane drill hall was completed in 1911.

== Milnsbridge today ==
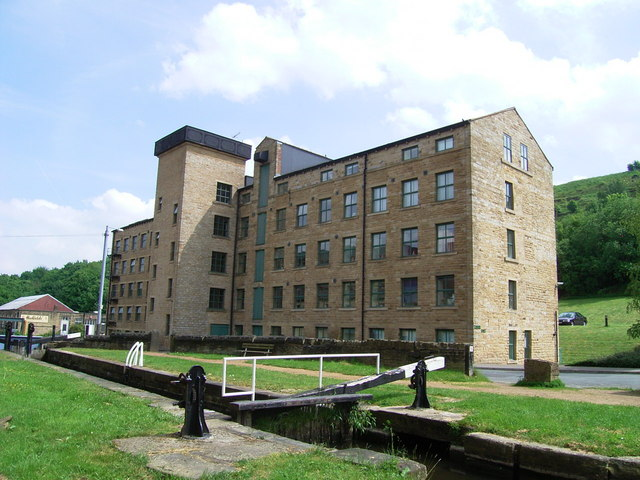
Burdett Mill, Milnsbridge

Today, there is less evidence of the cloth industry than there was, as most of the mill chimneys were removed when the mills were demolished or converted into housing. However, there are still many streets of 19th century terraced houses in the area; these were originally built as mill workers' houses.

Jack Ramsay in his book "Made in Huddersfield" describes Milnsbridge in 1989:

...for my own beliefs about the devastation and subsequent run-down feel of Milnsbridge are rooted in the very substance of the town's visual character, which is seen as being especially gloomy in the eyes of many local residents because the place is situated in the belly of the [Colne] valley and which has the psychological effect of making it appear somewhere rather morbid and inaccessible like a steelworks crowding the bottom of a hillside city.

Arthur Quarmby & Son, at Britannia Mills, manufactures pub-related items such as beer mats, mirrors and clocks. Trojan Plastics, at Britannia Mills, manufactures acrylic baths.

Milnsbridge spreads from Cowlersley - on the other side of the A62 Manchester Road - to Golcar, Longwood and Paddock. Since the demolition of the school on New Street (with its swimming pool) the main primary school in Milnsbridge has been Crow Lane School, with 11-18s either attending Royds Hall Academy, Salendine Nook High, All Saints Catholic High or Colne Valley High in Linthwaite. At the centre of Milnsbridge is the Baptist Chapel, a Grade II listed building founded in 1843, but rebuilt in 2004.

== Notable people ==
- Harold Wilson, Baron Wilson of Rievaulx, Labour politician and twice Prime Minister of the United Kingdom, was born and brought up in Milnsbridge.

== Publications ==
- Ramsay, Jack (1989) Made in Huddersfield ISBN 978-1-871939-00-2

== See also ==
- Listed buildings in Golcar
