= Listed buildings in Colne Valley (eastern area) =

Colne Valley is an unparished area in the metropolitan borough of Kirklees, West Yorkshire, England. Colne Valley ward contains over 480 listed buildings that are recorded in the National Heritage List for England. Of these, twelve are listed at Grade II*, the middle of the three grades, and the others are at Grade II, the lowest grade.

This list contains the listed buildings in the eastern part of the ward, in which the largest settlement is the village of Linthwaite, and it includes the smaller settlements and districts of Bolster Moor, Cowlersley, Nettleton Hill, Outlane, Scapegoat Hill, Upper and Lower Clough, and Upper and Lower Wellhouse. Apart from the settlements, this part of the ward is almost completely rural. A high proportion of the listed buildings are farmhouses and farm buildings, almost all constructed in stone with roofs of stone slate, and containing mullioned windows. During the 19th century, the ward was involved in the textile industry, and the listed buildings associated with this are former weavers' houses, mills, and associated structures. The River Colne and the Huddersfield Narrow Canal pass through this part of the ward, and the listed buildings associated with the canal are two bridges and a milestone. The other listed buildings include houses and cottages and associated structures, churches and chapels and associated structures, road milestones, and a former school.

The listed buildings in the other parts of the ward can be found at Listed buildings in Colne Valley (central area) and Listed buildings in Colne Valley (western area)

== Key ==
Grade	Criteria
II*	Particularly important buildings of more than special interest
II	Buildings of national importance and special interest

== Buildings ==
Name and location	Photograph	Date	Notes	Grade
69 Radcliffe Road, Lower Wellhouse; 53.62818°N 1.86445°W	—	17th century	The house, which was altered in the 19th century, is in stone, and has a stone slate roof with a coped gable to the east. There are two storeys, a lean-to extension on the north side, and buttresses on the east. In the ground floor is a mullioned window, three lights of which have been converted into a doorway and a modern porch. Over the window is a decorative hood mould. In the upper floor is an eleven-light mullioned window.	II
8 Radcliffe Road, Lower Wellhouse; 53.63178°N 1.85797°W	—	Late 17th to early 18th century	A stone house in a terrace, with quoins, a stone slate roof, and two storeys. The doorway has a stone surround, and there is a continuous hood mould over the ground floor openings. The windows are mullioned, some mullions have been removed, and four lights have semicircular arched heads with decorative motifs in the spandrels.	II
Large barn, Shaw Farm; 53.65284°N 1.86832°W	—	17th or 18th century	The barn is in stone with a stone slate roof, catslide to the east, it is aisled, and has four bays. To the south are a later cottage with mullioned windows, and a barn with a semicircular-headed doorway.	II
56 Upper Wellhouse; 53.63304°N 1.85859°W	—	1720	A stone house on a plinth, with quoins, a coped gable to the north, and two storeys. The east front contains a doorway, partly blocked, and mullioned windows. The openings in the ground floor have lintels, surrounds and tie-stones in millstone grit. The west front has been altered.	II
2-8 Cowlersley Lane; 53.63327°N 1.84008°W	—	18th century	A terrace of four stone houses that has a modern tile roof, with coped gables on cut kneelers. There are two storeys, No. 2 is slightly recessed, and the windows are mullioned.	II
Butterworth Hill Farmhouse; 53.65206°N 1.87842°W	—	18th century	A stone farmhouse that has a stone slate roof with coped gables. There are two storeys, and a single-storey extension to the west. The windows are mullioned, with a mullion removed, and a light blocked.	II
Round Ings; 53.64963°N 1.87717°W	—	18th century	A stone house with a stone slate roof and coped gables on cut kneelers. There are two storeys, and rear extensions under a catslide roof. The windows are mullioned, including a ten-light window in the upper floor.	II
11–15 Slack Lane and barn, Outlane; 53.65335°N 1.87511°W	—	1756	A row of houses with a barn attached at the north end, they are in stone and have a stone slate roof, hipped at the south, and with a coped gable and cut kneelers at the north end. The houses have two storeys, and contain a mix of casement and mullioned windows. The barn has double doors in a round arch with a keystone, and a catslide roof at the rear. On No. 11 is a dated and initialled panel.	II
Standing stone 53.64747°N 1.87195°W		1756	A milestone at a road junction, it is inscribed with the distances to Ripponden, Halifax and Slaithwaite, the date, and details of the surveyors.	II
257 and 259 Gillroyd Road and barn, Linthwaite; 53.62029°N 1.84998°W	—	1772	A row of two farmhouses and a barn, they are in stone with quoins, moulded stone gutter brackets, and a stone slate roof, with moulded kneelers to the west and carved kneelers to the east. There are two storeys, and the houses have doorways with stone surrounds, some single-light windows, and mainly mullioned windows with some mullions removed, and some lights blocked. One the front is a decorative initialled datestone. The barn contains two segmental-headed doorways with keystones, a mullioned window, a single-light window, and a smaller doorway.	II
38 Causeway Side, Linthwaite; 53.62335°N 1.85495°W	—	Late 18th century	A storey was added to the house in the 19th century. It is in stone with quoins and a stone roof. There are three storeys, and the gable end faces the street. The house contains two former doorways with large lintels, one single-light window, and the other windows are mullioned, with some blocked lights.	II
3 Hoyle House, Linthwaite; 53.62315°N 1.85679°W	—	Late 18th century	The house is in rendered stone with stone gutter brackets, and a stone slate roof. There are two storeys, the ground floor back to earth, and a modern extension. The windows are mullioned.	II
199 Lane Top, Linthwaite; 53.62540°N 1.84921°W	—	Late 18th century	A stone house at the end of a row, partly rendered, it has a stone slate roof with a coped gable and a kneeler on the south. There are two storeys, the house is built back to earth, there is a single-storey extension with a stone flag roof, and a later extension with a slate roof. In each floor is a four-light mullioned window.	II
18 Waingate and dwelling over, Linthwaite; 53.62191°N 1.85616°W	—	Late 18th century	The building is in stone with quoins, stone gutter brackets, and a stone slate roof with coped gables and moulded kneelers. There are three storeys, the ground floor back to earth. The doorway has a stone surround, and the windows are mullioned, with some mullions removed.	II
1 and 2 Hill Side and barn, Scapegoat Hill; 53.64259°N 1.86304°W	—	Late 18th century	A barn, a farmhouse and a cottage in one range, they are in stone with quoins. The barn has a stone slate roof with a coped gable, and the rest of the roof is tiled. There are two storeys, the ground floor back to earth. In the house and cottage, the doorways have stone surrounds, and the windows are mullioned, with one light blocked. The barn contains a large doorway with a semicircular head, a smaller doorway with a stone surround, and windows.	II
Canal 4 Miles post by lock 18; 53.62690°N 1.86326°W		1794–97	The milestone is on the south side of the Huddersfield Narrow Canal. It consists of a rectangular stone post with curved head, and has a round indented face inscribed "4 MILES".	II
Canal Bridge No. 38 (Scarwood Bridge); 53.63216°N 1.85134°W		1794–98	The bridge carries a footpath over the Huddersfield Narrow Canal. It is in stone and consists of a single arch. The bridge has a string course and a parapet with rounded copings. The footpath is paved with setts.	II
Golcar Brook Bridge; 53.63047°N 1.85378°W		1794–98	An accommodation bridge over the Huddersfield Narrow Canal. It is in stone and consists of a single arch. The bridge has a string course and a parapet with rounded copings, and the towpath passes to the side.	II
Radcliffe Road; 53.62859°N 1.86490°W	—	1797	A pair of mirror image weaver's houses, they are in stone, partly rendered, and have a stone slate roof with moulded kneelers on the west gable. There are three storeys and a single-storey extension to the east. The doorways have stone surrounds, and the windows are mullioned with some mullions removed, and some lights blocked.	II
58 and 60 Ramsden Mill Lane, Linthwaite; 53.63372°N 1.84275°W	—	Late 18th to early 19th century	A pair of stone houses at the end of a row, they have cast iron gutters on iron brackets, and a stone slate roof. There are two storeys, both houses have doorways with stone surrounds, No. 58 also has a fanlight, and the windows are mullioned.	II
76 and 78 Lower Wellhouse Road; 53.63365°N 1.85704°W	—	Late 18th to early 19th century	A pair of stone houses with quoins on the east, and a stone slate roof with coped gables on moulded kneelers. There are two storeys and an attic, the ground floor back to earth, and a small lean-to extension. The doorways have stone surrounds, and the windows are mullioned, with some lights blocked.	II
9 Green Edge, Nettleton Hill; 53.64794°N 1.86184°W	—	Late 18th to early 19th century	A stone house that has a stone slate roof with coped gables on cut kneelers, and two storeys. The windows are mullioned, with a six-light window in the ground floor, and a seven-light window in the upper floor.	II
1 Mole Head, Nettleton Hill; 53.64856°N 1.86100°W	—	Late 18th to early 19th century	The house, which was later extended to the south, is in stone, with a stone slate roof and two storeys. The windows are mullioned, with six lights in the upper floor and three lights in the ground floor.	II
771 and 773 New Hey Road, Outlane; 53.65790°N 1.87140°W	—	Late 18th to early 19th century	A pair of stone houses that have a stone slate roof with coped gables on cut kneelers. There are two storeys, the doorways are in the centre, and the windows are mullioned with four lights, and some mullions removed.	II
812–820 New Hey Road, Outlane; 53.65783°N 1.87252°W	—	Late 18th to early 19th century	A terrace of four roughcast stone houses with a stone slate roof. There are two storeys, and the windows are mullioned, with some mullions removed.	II
822–828 New Hey Road, Outlane; 53.65774°N 1.87289°W	—	Late 18th to early 19th century	A terrace of four roughcast stone houses that have a stone slate roof with coped gables on cut kneelers, and two storeys. The outer two houses have mullioned windows with some mullions removed, and in the inner two houses are sash and fixed windows.	II
7 and 9 Hollin Hall, Scapegoat Hill; 53.64416°N 1.85927°W	—	Late 18th to early 19th century	A terrace of two, originally three, houses with a later extension, they are in stone with quoins and a tile roof. There are two storeys, three doorways with stone surrounds and tie-stones, one partly blocked, and mullioned windows with some mullions removed.	II
Barn by 747 New Hey Road; 53.65801°N 1.86953°W	—	18th or early 19th century	Originally a laithe house, it is in stone with a stone slate roof, catslide to the east, and with coped gables on cut kneelers. The farmhouse contains sash windows, in the barn are central segmental-headed barn doors, and there is a lean-to extension.	II
Cote Farmhouse; 53.65681°N 1.87306°W	—	18th or early 19th century	A farmhouse and barn in one range, they are in stone, and have a stone slate roof with coped gables on cut kneelers. The house has two storeys and mullioned windows, and in the barn is a segmental-headed entrance.	II
Barn, Shaw Farm; 53.65301°N 1.86794°W	—	18th or early 19th century	The barn is in stone and has a stone slate roof and two storeys. It contains mullioned windows, with some mullions removed.	II
West Block, Westwood Mills; 53.62780°N 1.85799°W		c. 1800	Part of a textile mill, later extended, it is in gritstone with quoins. There are three storeys, sides of three and seven bays, and various extensions. The openings have been blocked, and include doorways, some with round-arched heads, windows, some mullioned, and loading doors.	II*
Mill Dam, Westwood Mills; 53.62753°N 1.85827°W	—	1801	The dam to the mill pond, which was later enlarged, is in millstone grit. It is about 3 metres (9.8 ft) high on the east face, and has sluice gates at each end. It is triangular in plan, and about 200 metres (660 ft) long and 50 metres (160 ft) wide.	II*
49 Blackmoorfoot Road and barn 53.61552°N 1.85042°W	—	1810	A house and barn in one range, they are in stone, and have a stone slate roof with a coped gable to the southwest. The house has two storeys, and contains a central doorway with a stone surround and tie-stones, a datestone, a square vent, a single-light window, and most of the windows are mullioned. The barn contains a central doorway with an elliptical head, and single-light windows.	II
49 Simon Green Road, Bolster Moor; 53.63180°N 1.86927°W	—	Early 19th century	Former weavers' houses and a wing to the left incorporated into a single dwelling, it is in stone and has a stone slate roof with coped gables. The main block has three storeys and a symmetrical front, and the wing has two storeys. In the centre is a doorway with a stone surround, and the windows are mullioned, with some lights blocked, and some mullions removed.	II
1 Hoyle House, Linthwaite; 53.62309°N 1.85678°W	—	Early 19th century	A stone house with quoins, stone gutter brackets, and a stone slate roof. There are two storeys, the ground floor back to earth, and a modern extension. The doorway has a stone surround and tie-stones, there is a single-light window, and the other windows are mullioned, with some mullions removed.	II
13 Hoyle House Fold, Linthwaite; 53.62440°N 1.85716°W	—	Early 19th century	A stone house with quoins, a stone slate roof, two storeys, and mullioned windows. The doorway to the left has a fanlight, to the right is a five-light window, and in the upper floor are two three-light widows.	II
437–445 Manchester Road, Linthwaite; 53.63366°N 1.84169°W		Early 19th century	A terrace of five stone houses that have a stone slate roof with coped gables on moulded kneelers. There are three storeys, five doorways with stone surrounds, one single light window, and the other windows are mullioned with some lights blocked.	II
2–12 Green Edge, Nettleton Hill; 53.64777°N 1.86246°W	—	Early 19th century	A terrace of stone houses with stone gutter brackets, a stone slate roof with coped gables, and two storeys. There are two modern casement windows, and the other windows are mullioned, with some lights blocked, and some mullions removed.	II
1–7 Cote, Outlane; 53.65711°N 1.87243°W	—	Early 19th century	A terrace of four houses in stone, with a stone slate roof and two storeys. The windows are mullioned, including a ten-light window at the rear with four blocked lights.	II
886 and 888 New Hey Road, Outlane; 53.65717°N 1.87430°W	—	Early 19th century	A pair of stone houses at the end of a row, they have a stone slate roof and two storeys. The doorways are to the right, and the windows are mullioned, with some mullions removed.	II
894 and 896 New Hey Road, Outlane; 53.65679°N 1.87529°W	—	Early 19th century	A pair of stone houses at the end of a terrace, with stone gutter brackets, a stone slate roof, and two storeys. The doorways are to the right, No. 894 has a porch, and in the upper floor are two six-light mullioned windows.	II
898 New Hey Road, Outlane; 53.65676°N 1.87540°W	—	Early 19th century	A stone house in a terrace, with a stone slate roof and three storeys. The doorway is to the right, and the windows are mullioned. In the ground floor is a five-light window, each of the upper floors contains an eight light window, some mullions have been removed, and most of the lights are arched.	II
900–908 New Hey Road, Outlane; 53.65669°N 1.87561°W	—	Early 19th century	A terrace of five stone houses with a stone slate roof and two storeys. The windows are mullioned with some mullions removed; in the ground floor they have four lights, and in the upper floor three lights.	II
910–914 New Hey Road, Outlane; 53.65643°N 1.87574°W	—	Early 19th century	A row of three stone houses with a stone slate roof and two storeys. The doorways are to the right, and the windows are mullioned.	II
940–944 New Hey Road, Outlane; 53.65625°N 1.87676°W	—	Early 19th century	A row of three stone houses with stone gutter brackets, a stone slate roof, and two storeys. The windows are mullioned, with ranges of three and five lights.	II
945–949 New Hey Road, Outlane; 53.65159°N 1.88403°W	—	Early 19th century	A row of three stone houses that have a stone slate roof with coped gables. There are two storeys, the doorways are to the left, and the windows are mullioned.	II
986 and 990 New Hey Road, Outlane; 53.65088°N 1.88606°W	—	Early 19th century	Originally a laithe house, later two houses with the barn converted for residential use. The building is in stone with a stone slate roof. There are two storeys and the windows are mullioned, with some mullions removed. In the former barn is a segmental-arched opening.	II
992 and 994 New Hey Road, Outlane; 53.65040°N 1.88702°W	—	Early 19th century	Originally a laithe house, later two houses with the barn converted for residential use. The building is in stone with a stone slate roof. There are two storeys and the windows are mullioned. In the former barn is a segmental-arched opening.	II
2–8 Springfield, Outlane; 53.65760°N 1.87153°W	—	Early 19th century	A terrace of four stone houses, with a stone slate roof and two storeys. The windows are mullioned, and include a seven-light window with two mullions removed, and a 15-light window with three lights blocked and one mullion removed.	II
Barn, Butterworth Hill Farm; 53.65178°N 1.87853°W	—	Early 19th century	A stone barn that has a stone slate roof with a coped gable. There are two storeys, and the barn contains two segmental-headed barn doors, each with a lunette above, and three smaller doorways.	II
Glenview; 53.65334°N 1.87582°W	—	Early 19th century	A stone house with a stone slate roof and two storeys. The near-central doorway has a stone surround, and the windows are mullioned, with some mullions removed.	II
Haughs Green; 53.64149°N 1.86553°W	—	Early 19th century	A terrace of three stone houses, the left house with a slate roof, the roof of the others in stone slate, and the gables are coped. There are two storeys, the middle house with a lean-to extension, and the left house with a basement. The doorways have stone surrounds, and the windows are mullioned.	II
Ryecroft; 53.64989°N 1.86095°W	—	Early 19th century	A stone house with a stone slate roof, two storeys, and a later extension to the north. In the original part the windows are mullioned, with some lights blocked, and in the extension they are sashes.	II
Springfield; 53.65846°N 1.87045°W	—	Early 19th century	A stone house with a stone slate roof and two storeys. There are two doorways, and the windows are mullioned and contain sashes.	II
North Range, Westwood Mills; 53.62794°N 1.85783°W		Early 19th century	A warehouse and workshop range in stone, it has three storeys and seven bays, and runs parallel to the towpath of the Huddersfield Narrow Canal. There is a stair tower, various doorways, in the upper two floors of the middle bay are two arched openings, probably loading doors, and the windows are almost square.	II*
Offices and Workshop Range, Westwood Mills; 53.62782°N 1.85770°W	—	Early 19th century	The building is in gritstone, and has two storeys, three bays, and the remains of a fourth bay. All the openings are blocked, and include doorways, mullioned windows, and a segmental arch with voussoirs.	II*
Boiler and engine houses, rope race, water tower and powerhouse, Westwood Mills; 53.62759°N 1.85782°W		1826	The former mill, which was later extended, is in gritstone with stone slate roofs. The powerhouse has three storeys and sides of three and four bays, It has stone gutter brackets and kneelers, and a roof of three parallel ridges. Attached on the left side is a two-storey building, and on the south are a water tower and a rope race. In the west end of the boiler house is a Venetian window.	II*
Christ Church, Linthwaite; 53.62636°N 1.84607°W		1827–28	A Commissioners' church, it was designed by Peter Atkinson, junior in Early English style, and the chancel was added in 1894–95 by C. Hodgson Fowler. It is built in stone with a slate roof, and consists of a nave, a south porch, a chancel, and a west steeple. The steeple has a tower and a broach spire with lucarnes. Most of the windows are lancets, and at the west end is an oculus on each side of the tower.	II
New Lane Farmhouse; 53.64719°N 1.86640°W	—	1830	A house with a barn to the south in one range, they are in stone with a sill band and a stone slate roof. There are two storeys and the windows are mullioned, with some lights blocked.	II
11–13 Bolster Moor Road; 53.63585°N 1.87123°W	—	Early to mid 19th century	A pair of houses in a row, they are in stone, partly rendered, with a stone slate roof and a coped gable to the west. There are three storeys, and the doorways have stone surrounds, one with a modern porch. The windows are mullioned, in the ground floor some mullions have been removed, and in the upper two floors the window have seven lights.	II
52 Simon Green Road, Bolster Moor; 53.63183°N 1.86952°W	—	Early to mid 19th century	A row of former weavers' cottages, in stone, with a stone slate roof and a coped gable. There are two storeys, the ground floor back to earth. On the front is a modern porch, and the windows are mullioned, with some mullions removed, and some lights blocked.	II
60 and 62 Cowersley Lane, Linthwaite; 53.63057°N 1.84311°W	—	Early to mid 19th century	A pair of mirror image cottages in stone, partly rendered, with stone gutter brackets, and a stone slate roof with coped gables and large moulded kneelers. There are two storeys, the doorways in the outer parts have stone surrounds and tie-stones, and the windows are mullioned.	II
126–132 Gillroyd Lane, Linthwaite; 53.62307°N 1.84921°W	—	Early to mid 19th century	A pair of cottages with underdwellings in stone, they have stone gutter brackets, and a stone slate roof with coped gables and kneelers. There are two storeys on the front facing the road and three at the rear. The doorways have stone surrounds and tie-stones, and the windows are mullioned with some mullions removed.	II
14 High House Lane, Linthwaite; 53.62014°N 1.85906°W	—	Early to mid 19th century	A weaver's house, later altered, it is in stone with stone gutter brackets, and a stone slate roof with a coped gable and moulded kneelers. There are three storeys, and the windows are mullioned, including a ten-light window in the top floor. In the west front is a semicircular-arched barn door and a smaller doorway.	II
21–25 Hoyle House, Linthwaite; 53.62267°N 1.85705°W	—	Early to mid 19th century	A pair of cottages with underdwellings, they are in stone, with large plinth stones, sill bands, stone gutter brackets, and a stone slate roof. There are three storeys, the ground floor back to earth, and vaulted cellars. Each dwelling has a doorway with a stone surround and tie-stones, and the windows are mullioned.	II
179 and 181 Knowl Road, Linthwaite; 53.62532°N 1.84968°W	—	Early to mid 19th century	Two houses in a row, they are in stone with a stone slate roof. There are two storeys, the rear built partly back to earth. The doorways have stone surrounds, and the windows are mullioned, with some blocked lights, and some lights with round heads.	II
203 and 205 Lane Top, Linthwaite; 53.62519°N 1.84924°W	—	Early to mid 19th century	A pair of stone houses at the end of a terrace, with a stone slate roof and two storeys. The doorways have stone surrounds and tie-stones, and the windows are mullioned, with some mullions removed.	II
207 and 209 Lane Top, Linthwaite; 53.62508°N 1.84929°W	—	Early to mid 19th century	A pair of stone houses in a terrace, with a stone slate roof and two storeys. The doorways have stone surrounds and tie-stones, some of the windows have single lights, and the others are mullioned, with some mullions removed.	II
211 and 213 Lane Top, Linthwaite; 53.62497°N 1.84933°W	—	Early to mid 19th century	A pair of houses at the end of a terrace, later combined into one, it is in stone with a stone slate roof, and two storeys. There are two doorways with stone surrounds, one blocked, and the windows are mullioned.	II
215–219 Lane Top, Linthwaite; 53.62479°N 1.84939°W	—	Early to mid 19th century	A terrace of three stone houses with moulded stone gutter brackets, a stone slate roof with coped gables on moulded kneelers, and two storeys. The doorways have stone surrounds and one has been converted into a window. Some windows have single lights, some are modern replacements, and the other are mullioned, with some mullions removed.	II
3 and 3A Low Westwood Lane, Linthwaite; 53.62996°N 1.85560°W	—	Early to mid 19th century	A pair of cottages in painted and rendered stone, with a stone slate roof and two storeys. There is a modern porch, some of the doorways have stone surrounds, some of the windows have single lights, and others are mullioned.	II
16–20 Low Westwood Lane, Linthwaite; 53.62956°N 1.85639°W	—	Early to mid 19th century	A terrace of three stone cottages with a stone slate roof and two storeys. The doorways have stone surrounds, and the windows are mullioned.	II
21 Waingate, Linthwaite; 53.62239°N 1.85506°W	—	Early to mid 19th century	A stone house with stone gutter brackets and a stone slate roof with a coped gable to the east. There are two storeys and a basement, and lean-to extensions. The doorways have stone surrounds, some windows have single lights, and the others are mullioned, with some lights blocked.	II
98 and 100 Lower Wellhouse Road; 53.63229°N 1.85742°W	—	Early to mid 19th century	A pair of stone weavers' houses incorporating earlier material, with stone gutter brackets and a stone slate roof. There are three storeys, No. 98 projects forward and has a doorway with millstone grit quoins, and an arched, initialled and dated lintel. The windows are mullioned, with some missing mullions and blocked lights, and there is one twelve-light window.	II
104 and 106 Lower Wellhouse Road; 53.63222°N 1.85764°W	—	Early to mid 19th century	A pair of houses in a group, in stone with quoins to the north, stone gutter brackets, and a stone slate roof with a coped gable to the west. There are three storeys and the doorways have stone surrounds. Most of the windows are mullioned, with some mullions removed, and in the top floor is a Venetian window.	II
81–85 Radcliffe Road, Lower Wellhouse; 53.62807°N 1.86637°W	—	Early to mid 19th century	A terrace of three stone houses with stone gutter brackets, a stone slate roof, and two storeys. The doorways have stone surrounds and tie-stones, and the windows are mullioned, with some lights blocked.	II
88 Radcliffe Road, Lower Wellhouse; 53.63254°N 1.85723°W	—	Early to mid 19th century	A weaver's cottage in stone, with a stone slate roof and two storeys. The windows are mullioned, and some mullions have been removed.	II
92 and 94 Radcliffe Road and barn, Lower Wellhouse; 53.62804°N 1.86986°W	—	Early to mid 19th century	Two weavers' houses and a barn in one range, they are in stone with stone gutter brackets, and a stone slate roof, coped at one end. In the houses are two doorways with stone surrounds, and mullioned windows with some lights blocked. The barn has quoins, a central doorway with a segmental head infilled with glass, and a small window in the gable.	II
5 Mole Head, Nettleton Hill; 53.64864°N 1.86080°W	—	Early to mid 19th century	A stone house with stone gutter brackets, a stone slate roof, and two storeys. In the ground floor is a three-light mullioned window, in the upper floor is a six-light mullioned window, and the other windows are casements.	II
21–27 Round Ings Road, Nettleton Hill; 53.64968°N 1.87871°W	—	Early to mid 19th century	Originally a laithe house, it consists of a row of houses and a barn to the right. The building is in stone with stone gutter brackets and a stone slate roof. The houses have two storeys, most of the windows are sashes, some are bipartite, and there are two six-light mullioned windows. In the barn is a round-arched cart entry with a round-arched window above.	II
842 and 844 New Hey Road, Outlane; 53.65743°N 1.87396°W	—	Early to mid 19th century	A pair of stone houses at the end of a terrace, with a sill band and a stone slate roof. There are two storeys, and in the upper floor are mullioned windows, one with five and the other with seven lights.	II
22–22A Chapel Street, Scapegoat Hill; 53.64496°N 1.86864°W	—	Early to mid 19th century	A pair of stone cottages that have a stone slate roof with coped gables, and two storeys. The two doorways are near the centre and have stone surrounds, and the windows are mullioned, including a 15-light window with two lights blocked in the upper floor.	II
122 and 124 High Street, Scapegoat Hill; 53.64287°N 1.87185°W	—	Early to mid 19th century	A pair of mirror image houses at the end of a row, they are in stone, partly rendered, with a string course, stone gutter brackets, and a stone slate roof. There are two storeys, and the ground floor is back to earth. The doorways are in the centre and have stone surrounds, and the windows are mullioned, with some blocked lights.	II
2 and 4 Pike Law Lane, Scapegoat Hill; 53.64231°N 1.86953°W	—	Early to mid 19th century	A mirror image pair of houses in stone with stone gutter brackets, and a stone slate roof with coped gables. There are two storeys, they are built back to earth at the rear, and there is a single-story lean-to extension. The doorways have stone surrounds, there are single-light windows, and most of the windows are mullioned.	II
3 Daisy Green and adjacent cottage, Upper Clough; 53.61688°N 1.85831°W	—	Early to mid 19th century	Two cottages at the end of a terrace, they are in stone, partly rendered, with moulded stone gutter brackets, and a stone slate roof with a coped gable on moulded kneelers to the east. There are two storeys and lean-to extensions. On the front are two doorways, one with a stone surround, the other modern, a single-light window, a modern bow window, mullioned windows with some mullions removed, and a blocked leading door. At the rear is a modern extension with casement windows.	II
5 Daisy Green and barn, Upper Clough; 53.61688°N 1.85848°W	—	Early to mid 19th century	A cottage and barn in a farm terrace, they are in stone, with stone gutter brackets, and a stone slate roof with projecting kneelers to the west. There are two storeys and a modern rear extension. On the front is a doorway with a stone surround, and a modern garage doorway, and the windows are mullioned. The barn has a large central segmental-arched doorway with a stone surround and tie-stones, over which is a window.	II
7 Daisy Green, Upper Clough; 53.61686°N 1.85864°W	—	Early to mid 19th century	Two cottages at the end of a terrace, later combined, they are in stone, partly rendered, with stone gutter brackets, and a stone slate roof with a coped gable on moulded kneelers to the west. There are two storeys and lean-to extensions. On the front are two doorways with stone surrounds, and the windows are mullioned.	II
2, 4, 8 and 10 Copley Bank Road, Upper Wellhouse; 53.63463°N 1.85741°W	—	Early to mid 19th century	A group of stone back-to-back houses, partly rendered, with stone gutter brackets, and a coped gable. There are three storeys and an attic, built back to earth at the rear. The doorway have stone surrounds and tie-stones, and the windows are mullioned.	II
1 and 3 Share Hill Road, Upper Wellhouse; 53.63531°N 1.85796°W	—	Early to mid 19th century	A pair of back-to-back houses in stone, partly rendered, with stone gutter brackets, and a stone slate roof with coped gables. There are two storeys and an attic, the doorways have stone surrounds, the windows are mullioned, and some lights have been blocked.	II
15 Share Hill Road, Upper Wellhouse; 53.63504°N 1.85765°W	—	Early to mid 19th century	A stone house, the northwest gable rendered, with a stone slate roof, and two storeys. The central doorway has a stone surround and tie-stones, and the windows are mullioned.	II
46 Upper Wellhouse; 53.63274°N 1.85929°W	—	Early to mid 19th century	A weaver's house in stone, with stone gutter brackets, a stone slate roof with coped gables, and three storeys. The windows are mullioned, some lights have round heads, some mullions have been removed, and the window in the top floor has 15 lights.	II
50 and 52 Upper Wellhouse; 53.63319°N 1.85848°W	—	Early to mid 19th century	A pair of weavers' houses in stone that have a stone slate roof with a coped gable on moulded kneelers to the southwest. There are three storeys and a basement, the ground floor back to earth. The doorways have stone surrounds and tie-stones, there is one window with a single light, and the other windows are mullioned, with some blocked lights, and some mullions removed.	II
62–68 Upper Wellhouse Road; 53.63358°N 1.85736°W	—	Early to mid 19th century	A terrace of four stone houses that have a stone slate roof with coped gables on moulded kneelers. There are three storeys at the front, two at the back, the ground floor back to earth. The doorways have stone surrounds and tie-stones, there are some single-light windows, and most windows are mullioned, with some blocked.	II
70 and 72 Well House Green, Upper Wellhouse; 53.63350°N 1.85730°W	—	Early to mid 19th century	A pair of mirror image weavers' houses in stone with a stone slate roof. There are two storeys, the ground floor back to earth. The two doorways have stone surrounds and tie-stones, and the windows are mullioned.	II
Bank End; 53.63590°N 1.86512°W		Early to mid 19th century	A terrace of six stone houses with a sill band, stone gutter brackets, and a stone slate roof with a coped gable. There are two storeys, the doorways have stone surrounds, some also have porches, and the windows are mullioned, with some mullions removed, and some windows altered.	II
New Street, Upper Clough; 53.61971°N 1.85859°W	—	Early to mid 19th century	A terrace of four stone houses with paired gutter brackets and a stone slate roof. There are two storeys and a rear extension to No. 34. The doorways have stone surrounds and the windows are mullioned. The windows of No. 32 have been altered and mullions have been removed. The other windows have lights with round heads.	II
Westwood (Fieldhouse Farm); 53.63192°N 1.87152°W	—	Early to mid 19th century	Originally two houses in a field terrace, the building is in stone with a tile roof and two storeys. It has a modern porch, mullioned windows with some lights blocked, an original window converted into a French window, and another altered window.	II
Westwood Fold (Green Lea); 53.63118°N 1.87224°W	—	Early to mid 19th century	Two houses in a terrace, they are in stone, with a stone slate roof and two storeys. There are two doorways with stone surrounds, and the windows are mullioned, with some lights blocked.	II
2–6 Radcliffe Road, Lower Wellhouse; 53.63184°N 1.85783°W	—	c. 1840	A row of three houses at the end of a terrace, they are in stone with stone gutter brackets, a stone slate roof. There are two storeys, and a single-storey extension to the north. Each house has a doorway to the left with a stone surround, a four-light mullioned window in the ground floor, and a seven-light mullioned window in the upper floor. On the front of No. 6 is a reset dated lintel in millstone grit.	II
71 Radcliffe Road, Lower Wellhouse; 53.62813°N 1.86456°W	—	c. 1840	A weaver's house in painted stone on a plinth with a stone slate roof. There are two storeys and a lean-to extension. The doorway has a stone surround, and the windows are mullioned.	II
75–79 Radcliffe Road, Lower Wellhouse; 53.62811°N 1.86609°W	—	c. 1840	A row of three stone houses with a stone slate roof and two storeys, the ground floor back to earth. The doorways have stone surrounds, and the windows are mullioned, with two later single-light windows.	II
Sharehill; 53.63680°N 1.86035°W	—	c. 1840	A stone house at the end of a terrace, partly rendered, it has stone gutter brackets, a pantile roof, and coped gables. There are two storeys and a central doorway with a stone surround. Some windows have single lights, and the others are mullioned, including a twelve-light window in the upper floor.	II
9 Sharehill Road, Upper Wellhouse; 53.63518°N 1.85775°W	—	1849	A stone house with a string course, stone gutter brackets, and a stone slate roof with coped gables. There are two storeys, the central doorway has a stone surround, the windows are mullioned, and in the upper floor is an initialled datestone.	II
72 and 74 Slades Road, Bolster Moor; 53.63694°N 1.86980°W	—	Mid 19th century	A pair of weavers' houses in a terrace, with rusticated quoins to the east, stone gutter brackets, and a stone slate roof with a coped gable to the south. The doorways have stone surrounds, one in a porch, and the windows are mullioned, with two later single-light windows.	II
2 Bolster Moor Road; 53.63577°N 1.86961°W	—	Mid 19th century	A stone house at the end of a terrace with stone gutter brackets, and a stone slate roof with coped gables. There are two storeys and an attic, the doorway has a stone surround, and the windows are mullioned, with some mullions removed. On the front, the ground floor contains a five-light window, there is an eight-light window in the upper floor, and in the attic is a blocked three-light window.	II
70 Slades Road, Bolster Moor; 53.63704°N 1.86986°W	—	Mid 19th century	A stone house at the end of a terrace, at one time a public house, it has rusticated quoins, stone gutter brackets, and a stone slate roof with coped gables. There are two storeys, a symmetrical front of three bays, and a later lean-to extension. The central doorway has rusticated quoins and a flat arched head with a keystone. Above it is a single-light window, and the other windows are mullioned, with some mullions removed.	II
205 and 207 Slades Road, Bolster Moor; 53.63395°N 1.86704°W	—	Mid 19th century	A pair of weavers' cottages at the end of a row. They are in stone with stone gutter brackets, and a stone slate roof with coped gables. There are two storeys and the windows are mullioned. Each house has a doorway with a stone surround and tie-stones, in the ground floor is a three-light window, and in the top floor a six-light window.	II
719–729 Manchester Road, Linthwaite; 53.62709°N 1.85387°W	—	Mid 19th century	A terrace of four houses with two underdwellings, in stone with stone gutter brackets, and a stone slate roof with coped gables. There are three storeys at the front, two at the rear, and a single-storey extension. The doorways have stone surrounds, and the windows are mullioned, with some mullions removed, some lights blocked, and some windows replaced by casements.	II
102 Lower Wellhouse Road; 53.63229°N 1.85760°W	—	Mid 19th century	A pair of weavers' houses in stone, with moulded stone gutter brackets, and a stone slate roof with coped gables. There are three storeys, and two doorways with stone surrounds and tie-stones. Most of the windows are mullioned, there is one single-light window, and in the west gable end is a blocked loading door.	II
5–15 Wellhouse Fields, Lower Wellhouse; 53.63091°N 1.85811°W	—	Mid 19th century	A terrace of stone cottages on a plinth, with sill bands, stone gutter brackets, a stone slate roof with a coped gable to the southeast, and two storeys. The doorways have stone surrounds and tie-stones, some windows have single lights, and the others are mullioned, with some lights blocked.	II
65 Low Westwood Lane, Lower Wellhouse; 53.63294°N 1.85650°W	—	Mid 19th century	A stone house at the end of a row, with a sill band, and a stone slate roof with a coped gable to the east. There are two storeys and a basement. In the basement is a large doorway with a stone surround and tie-stones, and in the ground floor is a modern porch. The windows are mullioned, with some mullions removed, and the lights have rounded heads.	II
6–10 Green Lane Terrace, Nettleton Hill; 53.64915°N 1.86254°W	—	Mid 19th century	A terrace of two houses and a barn to the left, it is in stone with a stone slate roof and two storeys. The barn has a segmental-headed entry, in the ground floor are sash windows, and the upper floor contains mullioned windows.	II
1, 3 and 5 Croft Top, Outlane; 53.65681°N 1.87509°W	—	Mid 19th century	A row of stone houses with stone gutter brackets, a stone slate roof, and three storeys. The windows are mullioned; in the upper two floors they have six lights, and in the ground floor they have four lights.	II
116–120 High Street, Scapegoat Hill; 53.64296°N 1.87172°W	—	Mid 19th century	A row of three houses, part of a terrace, they are in stone, with stone gutter brackets, and a stone slate roof with coped gables. There are two storeys, back to earth at the rear. Each house has a doorway with a stone surround and tie-stones on the front and a similar blocked door at the rear. The windows are mullioned, and each house has a six-light window in the upper floor on the front.	II
23, 25, 27 and 27A Slades Road, Scapegoat Hill; 53.64092°N 1.86536°W	—	Mid 19th century	A terrace of weavers' houses, they are in stone, with a sill band, stone gutter brackets above a string course, and a stone slate roof with coped gables. There are three storeys, in the ground floor is a modern porch and openings, elsewhere the doorways have stone surrounds, and the windows are mullioned with some mullions removed, and some lights blocked.	II
11 Share Hill Road, Upper Wellhouse; 53.63512°N 1.85781°W	—	Mid 19th century	A stone house, part of a group, with a sill band, stone gutter brackets, and a stone slate roof with a coped gable to the southwest. There are two storeys, the doorway has a stone surround, and the windows are mullioned, with some lights blocked.	II
Barber Row; 53.62623°N 1.85731°W	—	Mid 19th century	A terrace of six stone houses with moulded stone gutter brackets, and a stone slate roof with coped gables. There are two storeys, the doorways have stone surrounds, and the windows are mullioned.	II
Black Rock House; 53.62166°N 1.85589°W	—	Mid 19th century	A stone house with moulded stone gutter brackets, and a stone slate roof with coped gables. There are three storeys, and a symmetrical front of three bays. The central doorway has pilasters, a frieze, a cornice, and a fanlight, and the windows are mullioned.	II
Headwell Green; 53.63361°N 1.86657°W	—	Mid 19th century	A terrace of four weavers' houses in stone, with stone gutter brackets, and a stone slate roof with coped gables. There are three storeys, and at the rear are extensions with one or two storeys. The entrances are in modern porches, and the windows are mullioned, with some mullions removed, and some lights blocked.	II
Holywell; 53.62551°N 1.85713°W	—	Mid 19th century	A group of houses with underdwellings in stone, with stone gutter brackets, and a stone slate roof with coped gables. There are two storeys at the front, and three at the rear, and the windows are mullioned.	II
Simon Green; 53.63151°N 1.87005°W	—	Mid 19th century	A pair of weavers' houses in a terrace, in stone, with quoins, a sill band, and a stone slate roof. There are two storeys, and the windows are mullioned, including an eight-light window in the upper floor of each house.	II
1 and 3 Green Edge, Nettleton Hill; 53.64807°N 1.86210°W	—	1851	A pair of houses with a sill band, stone gutter brackets, a stone slate roof with coped gables, and two storeys. There is a nine-light mullioned window with three lights blocked in the upper floor, the mullions have been removed from the other windows, and on the front is a dated and inscribed plaque.	II
2-6 More Pleasant, Outlane; 53.65316°N 1.88294°W		1851	A former laithe house consisting of three houses and a barn to the right. The buildings are in stone with a stone slate roof. The houses have two storeys, and the windows are mullioned, including a 13-light window with four lights blocked in the upper floor. The barn has elliptically-headed barn doors and a round-arched window above, and in the gable end is a lunette. Over the door of No. 4 is an inscribed and dated plaque.	II
Linthwaite Methodist Chapel; 53.62239°N 1.85701°W		1867	The former church is in stone with a stone slate roof. There are two storeys and a basement, with a front of four bays, and six bays along the sides. The front is pedimented with an inscribed tablet in the tympanum. The middle two bays project, and contain two round-arched doorways over which is a cornice on foliated console brackets. They are flanked by segmental-arched windows, and in the upper floor are round-arched windows, the middle two paired.	II
3 miles post 53.63197°N 1.84529°W		Late 19th century	The milepost is on the southeast side of Manchester Road (A62 road), Linthwaite. It consists of a cast iron plate on a stone post, and has a triangular plan and a rounded top. On the top is "WAKEFIELD & AUSTERLANDS ROAD" and "LINTHWAITE", and on the sides are the distances to Huddersfield and Oldham. The makers' names are in small letters.	II
4 miles post 53.62310°N 1.86497°W		Late 19th century	The milepost is on the southeast side of Manchester Road (A62 road), Linthwaite. It consists of a cast iron plate on a stone post, and has a triangular plan and a rounded top. On the top is "WAKEFIELD & AUSTERLANDS ROAD" and "LINTHWAITE", and on the sides are the distances to Huddersfield and Oldham. The makers' names are in small letters.	II
Westwood Christian Centre; 53.63283°N 1.87337°W		Late 19th century	A mission church, later used for other purposes, it is in stone with rusticated quoins, and a slate roof with coped gables on moulded kneelers. The former church consists of a nave, a south porch, and a large lower chancel. The windows have arched heads and contain Y-tracery, and at the east end are three lancet windows. At the west end is a caretaker's flat in the basement.	II
Gate piers, Westwood Christian Centre; 53.63254°N 1.87303°W	—	Late 19th century	The gate piers at the entrance to the grounds are in stone. They have a square plan, and each pier has fielded panels, and a carved cap with a triangular pediment on each face. The iron gates are of a later date.	II
Assembly Hall, Linthwaite; 53.62188°N 1.85765°W		c. 1880	Originally a school, later used for other purposes, it is in stone, and has a slate roof with coped gables, and two storeys. Steps lead up to double doorways in the two-bay entrance front, and this is flanked by single-storey wings. The doorways have segmental heads and fanlights, and above them are two round-arched windows. At the top is a pedimented gable with an inscription and a quatrefoil in the tympanum, flanked by ball and stalk finials. Along the sides are seven bays, the outer and middle bays gabled.	II
Scapegoat Hill Baptist Church; 53.64555°N 1.86879°W		1899	The church is in stone with a blue slate roof, it has two storeys, an entrance front of three bays, and six bays along the sides. The entrance front is gabled with a ball and spike finial, and the bays are divided by piers. In the centre is a doorway with pilasters, an architrave, two fanlights with rounded heads, a frieze, and a pediment. The doorway is flanked by side lights, and in the outer bays are windows with quoins and a cornice. Above the doorway is a Venetian window with a keystone and a hood mould, and in the outer bays the windows have pediments. The gable contains an inscribed tablet, above which is a decorated pediment with scrolls. The windows along the sides have segmental-arched heads.	II
Gate, gate piers and railings, Scapegoat Hill Baptist Church; 53.64514°N 1.86876°W	—	c. 1899	At the entrance to the grounds of the church are two square stone gate piers with moulded caps, and between them are decorative iron gates. Flanking them are curving dwarf walls with iron railings.	II
Lowestwood (Titanic) Mill; 53.62837°N 1.85398°W		1911–12	The former woollen mill, later converted for residential use, is in stone with a triple hipped slate roof. There are six storeys, and sides of 26 and six bays, the corner bays projecting and surmounted by parapets. The windows are casements, round-headed in the corner bays, and with segmental heads elsewhere. The middle seven bays of the northwest front project and have a parapet with dies, and on the southeast front is a stair tower with a bracketed cornice and a parapet.	II
