= Cowlersley =

District of Huddersfield, Yorkshire, England

Coordinates: 53.6347°N 1.8366°W

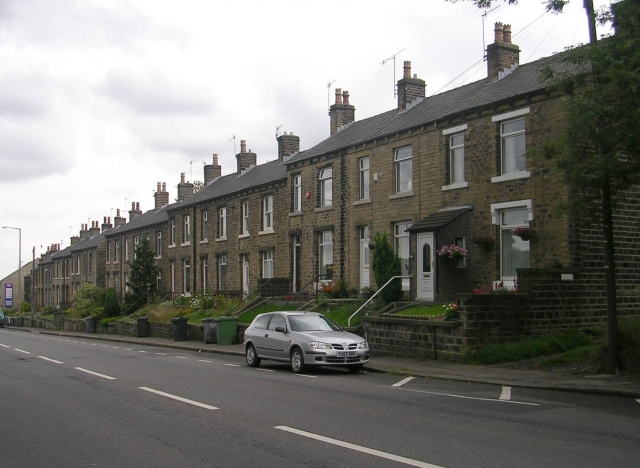
- Manchester Road, Cowersley (2008)

- Location within West Yorkshire
- OS grid reference: SE108153
- Metropolitan borough: Kirklees
- Metropolitan county: West Yorkshire
- Region: Yorkshire and the Humber
- Country: England
- Sovereign state: United Kingdom
- Post town: HUDDERSFIELD
- Postcode district: HD4
- Dialling code: 01484
- Police: West Yorkshire
- Fire: West Yorkshire
- Ambulance: Yorkshire
- UK Parliament: Colne Valley

Cowlersley is a district 2 miles (3.2 km) west of Huddersfield, West Yorkshire, England. It is situated between Milnsbridge and Linthwaite and south of the A62 and the River Colne. The name Cowlersley means 'a charcoal burner's wood' and was first recorded in 1226.

The district has a primary school, Woodside Green, which was inspected by Ofsted in 2022 and listed as "Good".

Its main claim to fame is that the former British prime minister Harold Wilson grew up in Cowlersley, at 4 Warneford Road.

== See also ==
- Listed buildings in Colne Valley (eastern area)
- Listed buildings in Golcar
