= Colne Valley High School =

- CVHS

Location
- Gillroyd Lane; Linthwaite; West Yorkshire, HD7 5SP; England; 53.6240°N 1.8466°W

Information
- Type: Comprehensive; Academy
- Established: 11 January 1956
- Local authority: Kirklees
- Trust: The Great Heights Academy Trust
- Department for Education URN: 140660 Tables
- Ofsted: Reports
- Executive Principal: Chris Alker
- Gender: Mixed
- Age: 11 to 16
- Language: English
- Colours: Maroon, Gold
- Website: https://www.thecvhs.co.uk/

Colne Valley High School (abbreviated: CVHS) is a comprehensive coeducational secondary school in the village of Linthwaite, Huddersfield, West Yorkshire, England. It is named thus because it stands in the Colne Valley, one of several valleys that converge at the town of Huddersfield. It has approximately 1400 pupils, with forms from A to J. The school has years 7 to 11, and four main buildings: A block, B block, C block and D (Music) block as well as the sports hall, and TS Corridor (Design Technology).

The school converted to academy status in September 2014 and is sponsored by The Mirfield Free Grammar.

== History ==
Founded in January 1956, Colne valley high school was the first, purpose built comprehensive in the north of England at a cost of £350,000. Built on a 38-acre, greenfield site overlooking Linthwaite and the Colne Valley, the initial intake of 860 would, at its peak, encompass almost 1900 pupils, including a sixth form.

The school initially consisted of a four-storey ‘A’ Block, and library and workshop corridors (for woodwork and metalwork), with both leading to the 2 storey ‘B’ block containing the arts rooms and science labs. A farm, a self contained flat (for domestic science) and large and small gymnasiums were also included, with the music blocks and the large theatre added in the second phase.

The raising of the school leaving age in 1972 led to the creation of a ‘C’ Block to cater for the overflow.

The school's first headteacher, 36 year old Ernest Butcher, was handed the task of steering this relatively new system through choppy educational waters, to be followed by Tom Rolf (1966) Allan Newton (1977), Linda Wright (1997), Denise Tonkins (2005), Maggie Dunn (2013), Christian Wilcocks, (2014) James Christian (2017).

== Notable alumnus ==
The English poet, playwright and novelist, and Poet Laureate Simon Armitage was a pupil.

== Sporting achievements ==
- 1968 - CVHS wins Yorkshire Cross-Country Championship
