= Thornton & Ross =

British pharmaceutical company

- Industry: Pharmaceuticals
- Founded: 1922
- Founder: Nathan Thornton; Phillip Ross
- Headquarters: Linthwaite, Kirklees, West Yorkshire, England
- Website: www.thorntonross.com

Thornton & Ross is a pharmaceutical company based in Linthwaite, Huddersfield founded in 1922 by Nathan Thornton and Phillip Ross.

It is the producer of Covonia cough medicine, Zoflora disinfectant, Hedrin head lice treatment, and the Care range of medicines. The company was acquired by Stada Arzneimittel in a £221 million deal in August 2013.

Covonia was one of the biggest selling branded over-the-counter medications sold in Great Britain in 2016, with sales of £23.8 million. According to one press report it contains just under 8% alcohol, although according to the manufacturer's website it contains 0.18% alcohol.

Stada Arzneimittel bought Natures Aid, based in Kirkham, Lancashire in November 2016 intending to bring the two businesses together.

It signed a licensing agreement with Futura Medical in January 2017 for the commercialisation of TPR100, diclofenac gel.
