= Scapegoat Hill =

Coordinates: 53.644307°N 1.867756°W

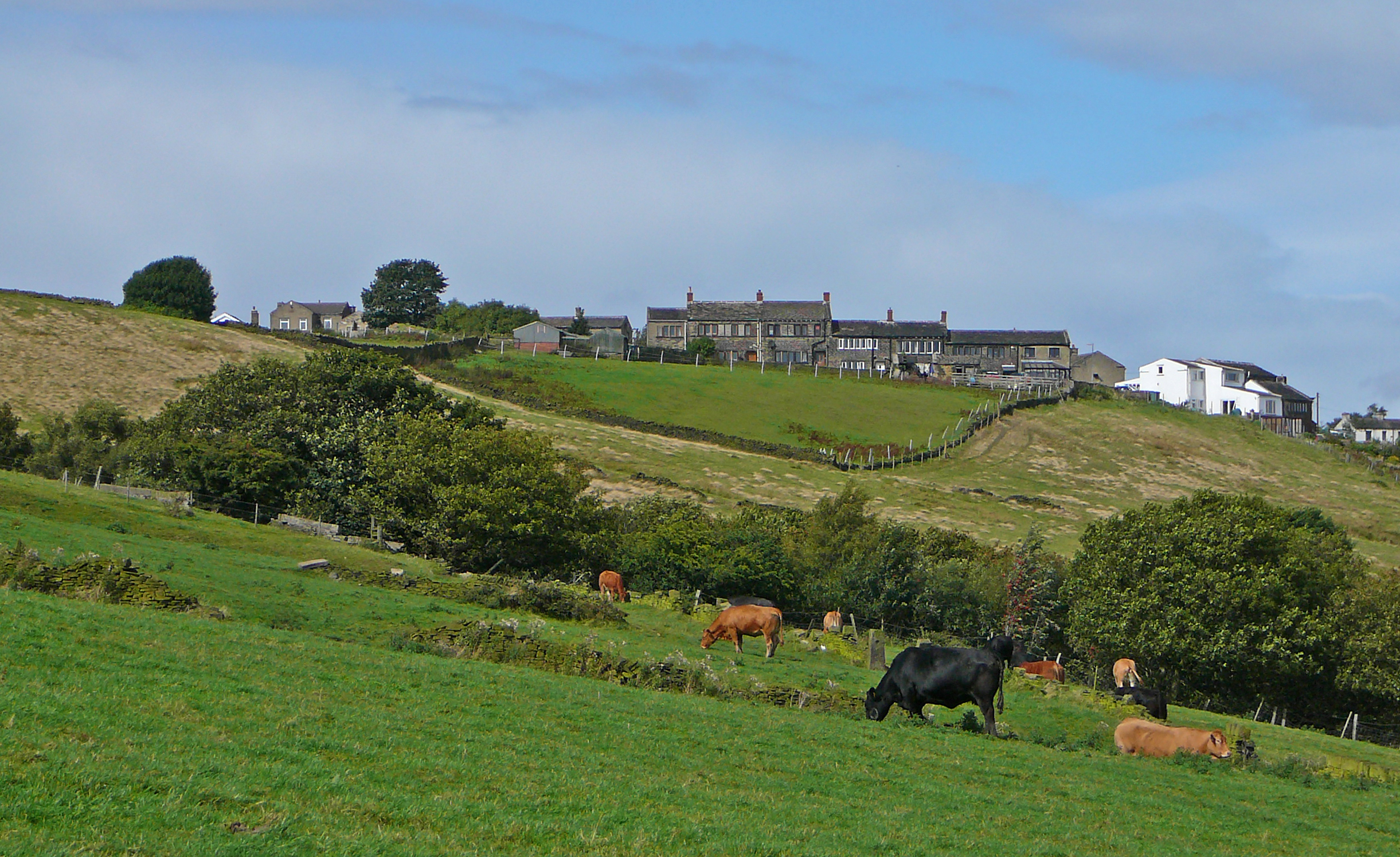
- View of the village

- Location within West Yorkshire
- Population: 1,246
- OS grid reference: SE0884016430
- Metropolitan borough: Kirklees
- Metropolitan county: West Yorkshire
- Region: Yorkshire and the Humber
- Country: England
- Sovereign state: United Kingdom
- Post town: HUDDERSFIELD
- Postcode district: HD7
- Dialling code: 01484
- Police: West Yorkshire
- Fire: West Yorkshire
- Ambulance: Yorkshire
- UK Parliament: Colne Valley

Scapegoat Hill is a small village 5 miles (8 km) west of Huddersfield, West Yorkshire, England. It is near to the villages of Slaithwaite and Golcar. The village together with nearby Bolster Moor has a population of 1,246.

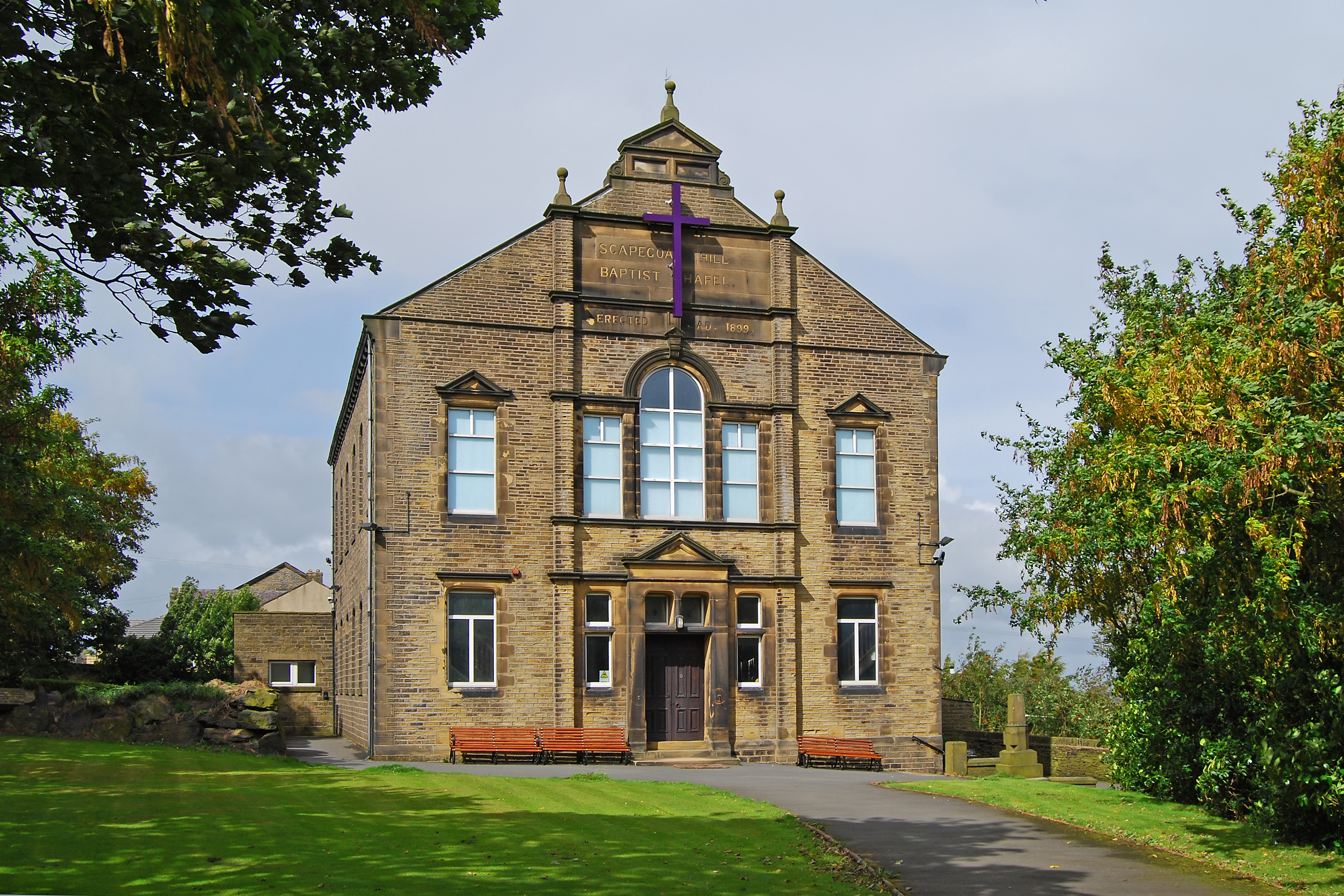
Baptist chapel

This Pennine village is 328 metres above sea level at its highest point (near the millennium stone). This leads to good views over Huddersfield and the Colne Valley. It is also nearby the Moorside Edge Radio transmitter.

The first recorded mention is from 1638 in the records of Huddersfield Parish Church on the death of a child of a William Aneley. At that date, the place was called 'Slipcoat' (or Slippery Coat) Hill. The first record of the name 'Scapegoat Hill' occurs in an Enclosure notice placed in the Leeds Mercury in 1820. Although the first Ordnance Survey map (of 1843) uses the old name, 'Scapegoat Hill' was in regular use after 1820.

The village grew up around the woollen trade, and, in spite of having no mill, continued to grow in size throughout the nineteenth century. In fact, handloom weavers are recorded here as late as 1935. Throughout the nineteenth century and well into the twentieth, the village was a very strong centre of baptism opening a church as a daughter of the Pole Moor Church 1871 and moving to its present building in 1900.

== See also ==
- Listed buildings in Colne Valley (eastern area)
