= Linthwaite =

Village in West Yorkshire, England

Coordinates: 53.6264°N 1.8461°W

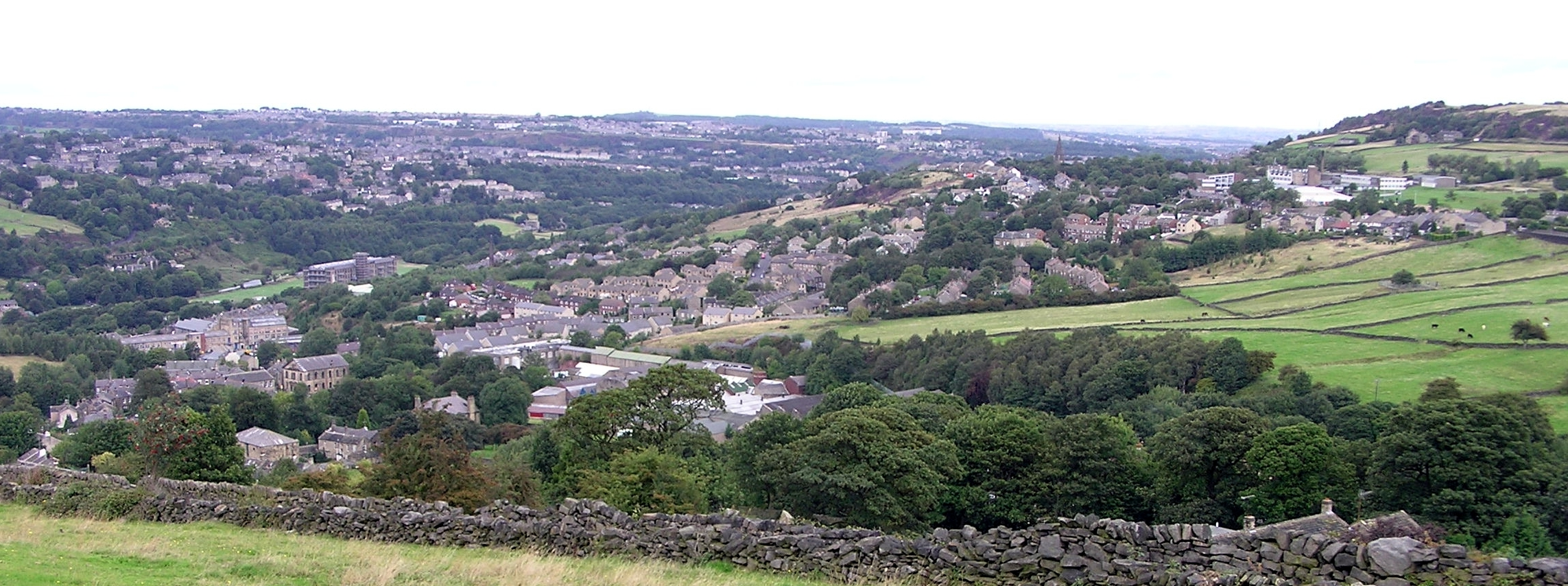
- View down valley to Linthwaite from High House Edge, Blackmoorfoot

- Location within West Yorkshire
- Population: 3,835 (2001 census)
- OS grid reference: SE1027614439
- Metropolitan borough: Kirklees
- Metropolitan county: West Yorkshire
- Region: Yorkshire and the Humber
- Country: England
- Sovereign state: United Kingdom
- Post town: HUDDERSFIELD
- Postcode district: HD7
- Dialling code: 01484
- Police: West Yorkshire
- Fire: West Yorkshire
- Ambulance: Yorkshire
- UK Parliament: Colne Valley

Linthwaite (known as Linfit in the local community) is a village in the Kirklees district, in West Yorkshire, England. Historically part of the West Riding of Yorkshire, it is situated 4 miles (6.4 km) west of Huddersfield, on the A62 in the Colne Valley. The village together with Blackmoorfoot had a population of 3,835 according to the 2001 census.

The River Colne, Huddersfield Narrow Canal, the Huddersfield to Manchester railway line and A62 main road all pass near to the village. After they were constructed, textile mills were then built to produce cloth making use of the river. This led to the growth of the village. Linthwaite Hall on Linfit Fold was built around 1600.

Currently, it is a busy village with five pubs. Blackmoorfoot Reservoir, at the top of Gilroyd Lane, is a wintering site for migrating wildfowl and wading birds.

== History ==
The name Linthwaite derives from either the Old Norse línþveit meaning 'flax clearing', or lindþveit meaning 'lime-wood clearing'.

Linthwaite is believed to be given where the surname Dyson started in 1316.

Linthwaite was formerly a township and chapelry in the parish of Almondbury, in 1866 Linthwaite became a separate civil parish, in 1894 Linthwaite became an urban district, on 1 April 1937 the district was abolished to form Colne Valley Urban District, part also went to the County Borough of Huddersfield. On 1 April 1937 the parish was abolished to form Colne Valley, part also went to Huddersfield. In 1931 the parish had a population of 9,688.

== Education ==
There are two primary schools and a secondary in the village: Linthwaite Ardron Memorial Junior School and the Linthwaite Clough Junior Infant and Early Years School for local children; and Colne Valley High School, whose catchment area is described in the name.

== Sport ==
In sport the village has two teams in the Huddersfield District Cricket League: Broad Oak (near the church) won the 2023 Sykes Cup and Linthwaite (in the valley).

Linthwaite have 3 senior football teams playing in the Huddersfield District League. They won the Division One & Barlow Cup double in 2018/19.

Linthwaite also has football teams playing in the RCD Junior Football League from under-8s right up to under-18s. They also have a football group of 5-to-7 year olds.

== Culture ==
The leadboilers festival is an annual festival held in Linthwaite.

Colne Valley Male Voice Choir, established in 1922,, now rehearses in Linthwaite. The choir often performs alongside brass bands, such as the Brighouse and Rastrick Brass Band. In 2010, the choir launched the Colne Valley Boys choir. The regularly supports a service club in Linthwaite, the Colne Valley Lions, with their annual charity concert.

== Industry ==
The largest employer in the village is pharmaceutical drug manufacturer Thornton & Ross, the producer of Covonia cough medicine. The company, which was founded by Nathan Thornton and Phillip Ross in 1922, was acquired by STADA Arzneimittel in a £221 million deal in August 2013.

== See also ==
- Listed buildings in Colne Valley (eastern area)
