= Colne Valley Museum =

Museum in West Yorkshire, England

Coordinates: 53.638700°N 1.856760°W

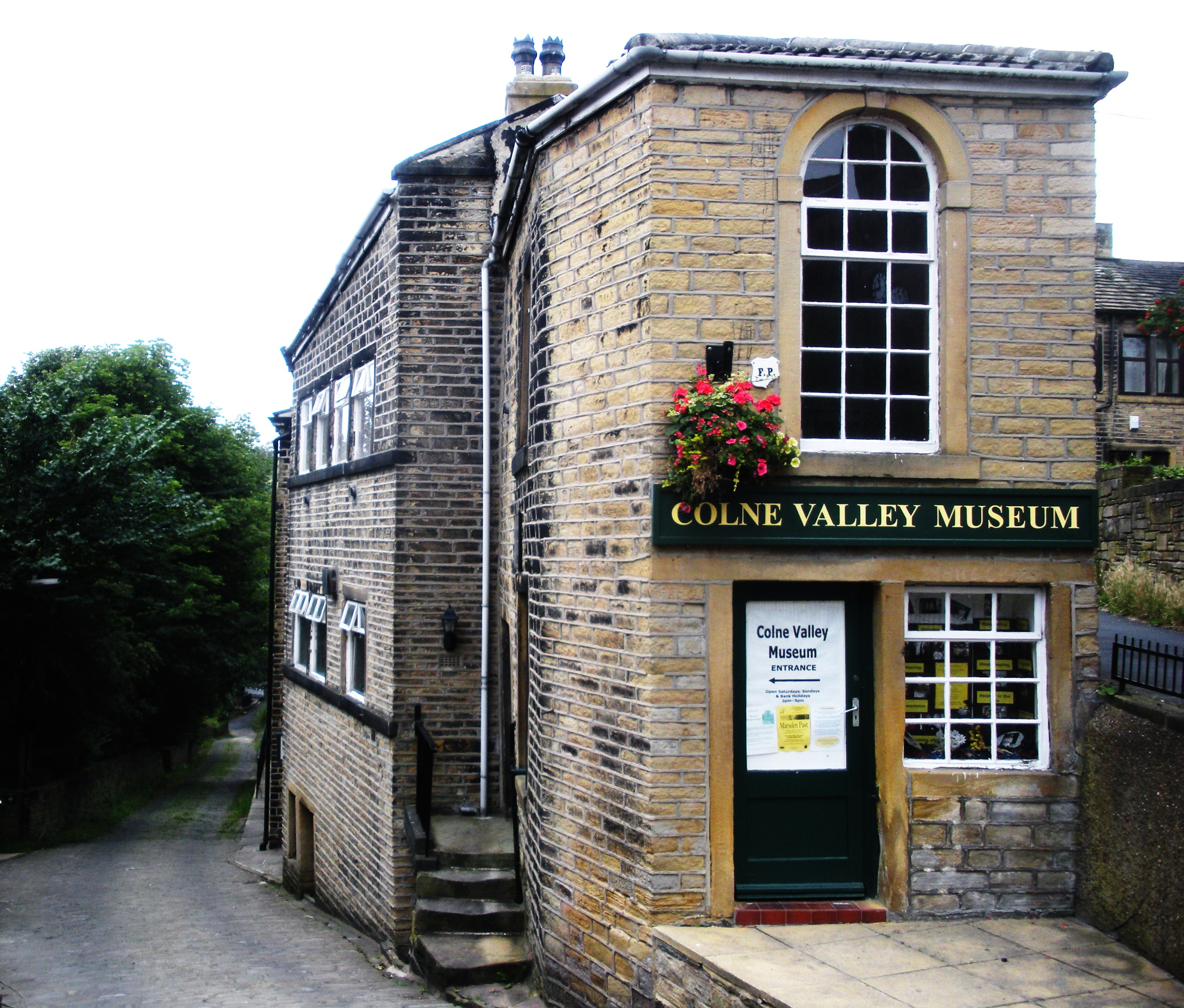
- Colne Valley Museum, Golcar
- Established: 1887
- Location: Cliffe Ash, Golcar, Huddersfield, HD7 4PY
- Type: Textile, Crafts
- Website: www.colnevalleymuseum.org.uk

The Colne Valley Museum is in the Colne Valley at Golcar, Huddersfield, West Yorkshire, England. The museum consists of four converted 19th-century weavers' cottages. The museum provides an insight into what life was like for a weaver in the early 1850s. The museum includes a clog-maker's workshop, a handloom chamber, a spinning room, a cropping room, kitchen and living rooms. The museum is run entirely by volunteers.

== History ==
The original row of four cottages was built in the 1840s by James and Sally Pearson, who were independent cloth manufacturers. It was built into a steep hillside with a traditional entrance for the lower rooms and a separate entrance to the upper floor at the rear of the cottages. In 1970, three of the cottages were converted to house the museum. The cottages were named Spring Rock.

The museum features several restored period rooms, which are also used for temporary exhibits. Permanent exhibits include a handloom and a spinning jenny, invented by James Hargreaves, a weaver's sitting room and gas-lit clogger's shop.

The museum is open for school visits, for which children are encouraged to dress in period clothing, from Monday to Friday. Some weekends the museum opens for demonstrations and exhibitions by the volunteer helpers, who demonstrate the types of craft that would have existed during the 19th century.

== See also ==
- Colne Valley
- Golcar
