= Longwood, Huddersfield =

Village in England

Coordinates: 53.646158°N 1.833231°W

Longwood
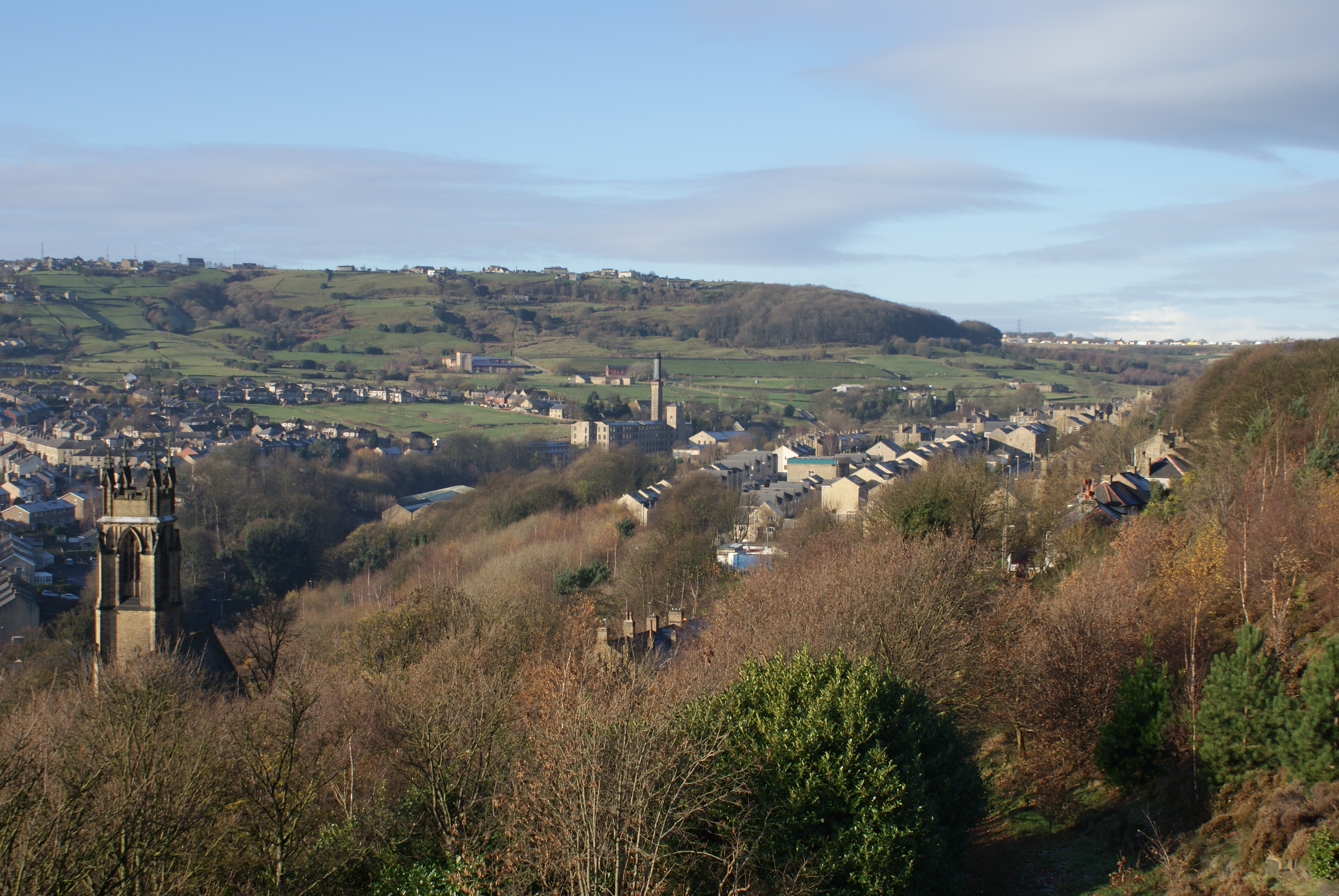
- View over Longwood from Nab End Tower

- Location within West Yorkshire
- OS grid reference: SE110167
- Metropolitan borough: Kirklees
- Metropolitan county: West Yorkshire
- Region: Yorkshire and the Humber
- Country: England
- Sovereign state: United Kingdom
- Post town: HUDDERSFIELD
- Postcode district: HD3
- Dialling code: 01484
- Police: West Yorkshire
- Fire: West Yorkshire
- Ambulance: Yorkshire
- UK Parliament: Colne Valley

Longwood is a village and suburb of the town of Huddersfield in the English county of West Yorkshire. It is situated some 2.5 miles (4.0 km) west of Huddersfield town centre, in the valley of the Longwood Brook, a tributary of the River Colne.

The village is the home of the Longwood Sing, an annual event, where choirs from around the area gather to sing hymns and songs. Near the amphitheatre, where the sing takes place, the folly Nab End Tower can be found. The tower was built in 1861 by unemployed local woollen mill workers. In 2008 it was restored by Kirklees Metropolitan Borough Council at a cost of £200,000.

There are also three reservoirs that supply Huddersfield. They were built around 1840, although strengthening work in the 1930s makes them appear newer. One now covered and the lower reservoir looking more like a natural lake that is called a compensation reservoir - 'Compensation' as it was set up to compensate the mill owner for water lost from natural sources that now went to the main reservoirs to be distributed by the water corporation under 'rates' systems - although the mill owner was most likely the owner of the main reservoir too.

During the 1840s, Longwood was the home to the Hanson family of Ballroyd. Mary Hanson set up a carrying business to supplement her husband's income from farming and soon the Hanson wagons were seen taking the Great North Road to London. James Hanson, founder and former chairman of Hanson plc, is a direct descendant of the Ballroyd family. When he was made a life peer, he took the title Baron Hanson of Edgerton after the nearby suburb of Edgerton.

Longwood was built up around the woollen industry and its mills, most of which have now been demolished and replaced by housing. As a result of this the village has recently seen an influx of new inhabitants.

In 2005, a campaign was mounted to save the Longwood allotment plots (situated behind the Mechanics' Institute) from being developed into housing.

Longwood Church is dedicated to St. Mark, and is in the Church of England parish of Huddersfield, being a perpetual curacy. Longwood is also home to the 27th Longwood Scout Group.

The name Longwood derives from Old English Lang wudu, meaning "The Long Wood".

== See also ==
- Listed buildings in Golcar
