= Colne Valley =

Valley in West Yorkshire, England

Coordinates: 53.6272°N 1.8624°W

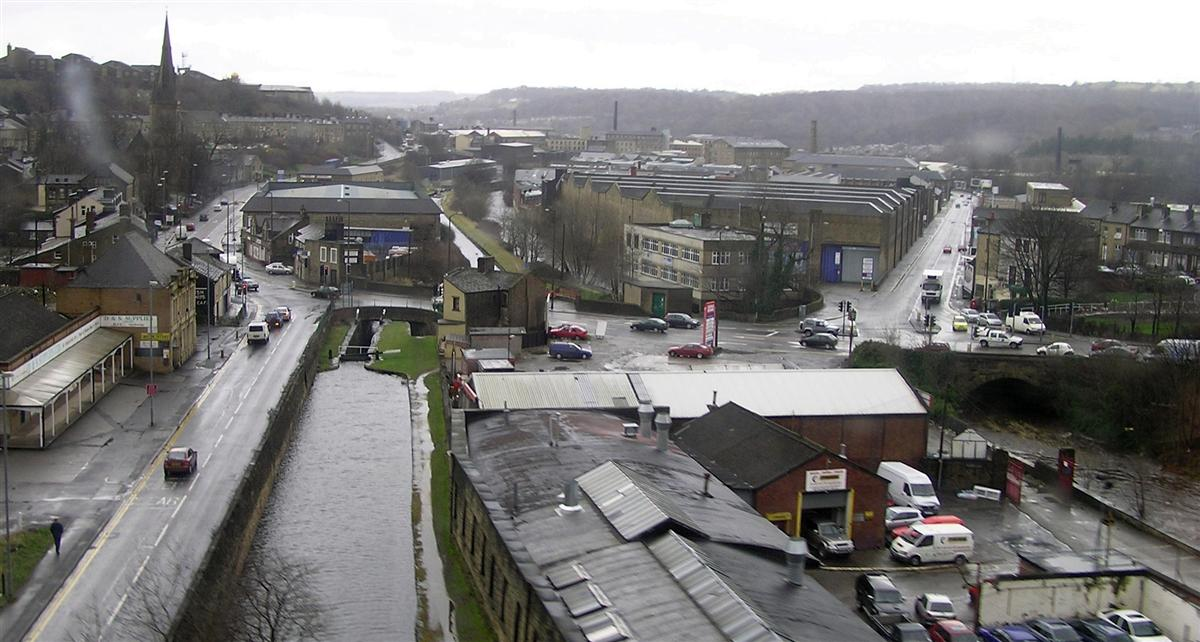
- Longroyd Bridge showing route of the A62 over the canal and River Colne and into the Colne Valley from Huddersfield town centre

- Location within West Yorkshire
- Metropolitan borough: Kirklees
- Metropolitan county: West Yorkshire
- Region: Yorkshire and the Humber
- Country: England
- Sovereign state: United Kingdom
- Police: West Yorkshire
- Fire: West Yorkshire
- Ambulance: Yorkshire

The Colne Valley /ˈkoʊn/ is a steep sided valley on the east flank of the Pennine Hills in the English county of West Yorkshire. It takes its name from the River Colne which rises above the town of Marsden and flows eastward towards Huddersfield.

The name is used to describe that section of the valley between its source and Huddersfield at the point where the River Holme joins the Colne. The name can describe the whole valley of the Colne, including the section through Huddersfield its confluence with the River Calder at Cooper Bridge. Using the more common definition, the Colne Valley includes the towns and villages of Marsden, Slaithwaite, Linthwaite, Milnsbridge, Scapegoat Hill, Longwood and Golcar.

== Industry and economy ==
The Colne Valley played a significant role in the development of the Industrial Revolution. Most of the population had been hand loom weavers for generations but when water-powered textile mills were built on the streams and rivers, the area was set to become a major producer of textiles. The Colne and the Huddersfield Narrow Canal provided transport links which were added to by road and railway links to Huddersfield and Leeds to the east and Manchester and Liverpool to the west.

By the end of the Second World War, the importance of the Colne Valley as a centre of textile production had begun to decrease and Huddersfield Narrow Canal was largely abandoned in 1944. The area is now primarily residential, its transport links making it ideal for commuters. Tourism is promoted: the Huddersfield Narrow Canal was reopened in 2001 and boat trips into Standedge Canal Tunnel are available; the National Trust advertises walks on Marsden Moor Estate; and television programmes such as Last of the Summer Wine and Where the Heart Is have been filmed there.

== Government and politics ==
Colne Valley was an urban district of the West Riding of Yorkshire between 1937 and 1974. It was created by the merger of Golcar, Linthwaite, Marsden, Scammonden and Slaithwaite urban districts, and had a population of about 20,000. The Local Government Act 1972 saw it merged into the metropolitan borough of Kirklees. It is a ward of Kirklees Council, whose population at the 2011 census was 17,369.

The Colne Valley parliamentary constituency preserves the Colne Valley name, although the constituency also includes the Holme Valley, Meltham and the outskirts of Huddersfield. Notable former MPs for the constituency include Victor Grayson and Richard Wainwright. The current MP is Paul Davies - Labour

== See also ==
Colne Valley Museum
