= River Colne, West Yorkshire =

River in West Yorkshire, England

River Colne
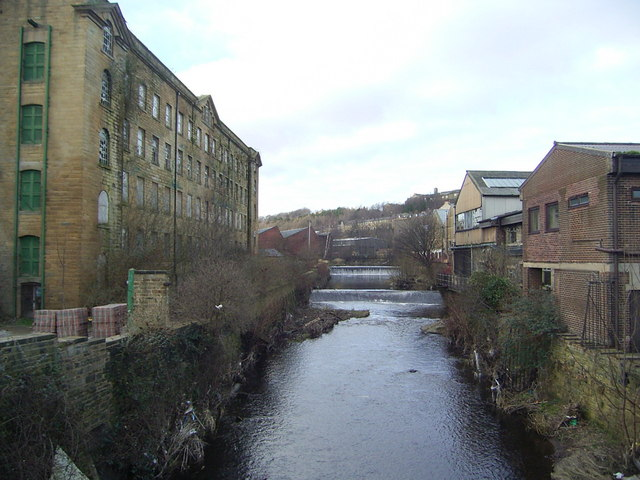
- The River Colne at the bottom of Chapel Hill just outside Huddersfield Town Centre. The mill on the left is Folly Hall Mill built in 1822 by Joseph Kaye.

Location
- Country: England

Physical characteristics
- Source
  - location: Confluence of Redbrook Clough and Haigh Clough
  - coordinates: 53°36′19″N 1°57′28″W
  - elevation: 768 feet (234 m)
- Mouth
  - location: River Calder near Bradley
  - coordinates: 53°40′49″N 1°43′52″W
- Length: 12 mi (19 km)
- Basin size: 94.5 sq mi (245 km^{2})

The River Colne /ˈkoʊn/ in West Yorkshire is formed at the confluence of two brooks that originate in the Pennines close to Marsden. It flows in an easterly direction through the Colne Valley and Huddersfield towards Cooper Bridge where it flows into the River Calder.

== Course ==
Brooks formed by rainwater high (between 300 and 480 metres AMSL) in the Pennines of West Yorkshire, flow down the hillsides through the small valleys known locally as cloughs to fill March Haigh and Redbrook Reservoirs. The Haigh Brook and Redbrook continue down the valley fed by more tributaries, until they converge at a scenic spot called Close Gate or Eastergate Bridge where the River Colne is formed.

The river flows from west to east through the Colne Valley passing through Marsden, Slaithwaite and Milnsbridge to Huddersfield and then on to Cooper Bridge where it feeds the larger River Calder.

Its tributaries include Wessenden Brook, Bradley Brook, Crimble Brook, Mag Brook, Fenay Brook, New Mill Dike and the River Holme.

== History ==
Due to the soft, acidic waters of the River Colne and its brooks flowing through the side valleys (cloughs) from the peat moors above, the Colne Valley was renowned for producing some of the highest quality woollen and cotton cloth produced anywhere.

== Infrastructure ==
The Huddersfield Narrow Canal follows the course of the river through the valley, as does the Huddersfield Line railway, and the A62 road. The river itself is too shallow and rocky to be navigable by any watercraft.

There are numerous factories, warehouses and plants along the river providing goods, services and jobs, but a few of these cause pollution to the local environment and waterways. In order to help tackle pollution, the Environment Agency demand that certain standards be met by local companies.

On 24 May 2010, part of a chemical factory was accidentally set ablaze and caused waste to be emptied into the river and the canal causing the deaths of many fish.

== See also ==
- Colne Valley
