= Turnbridge Lift Bridge =

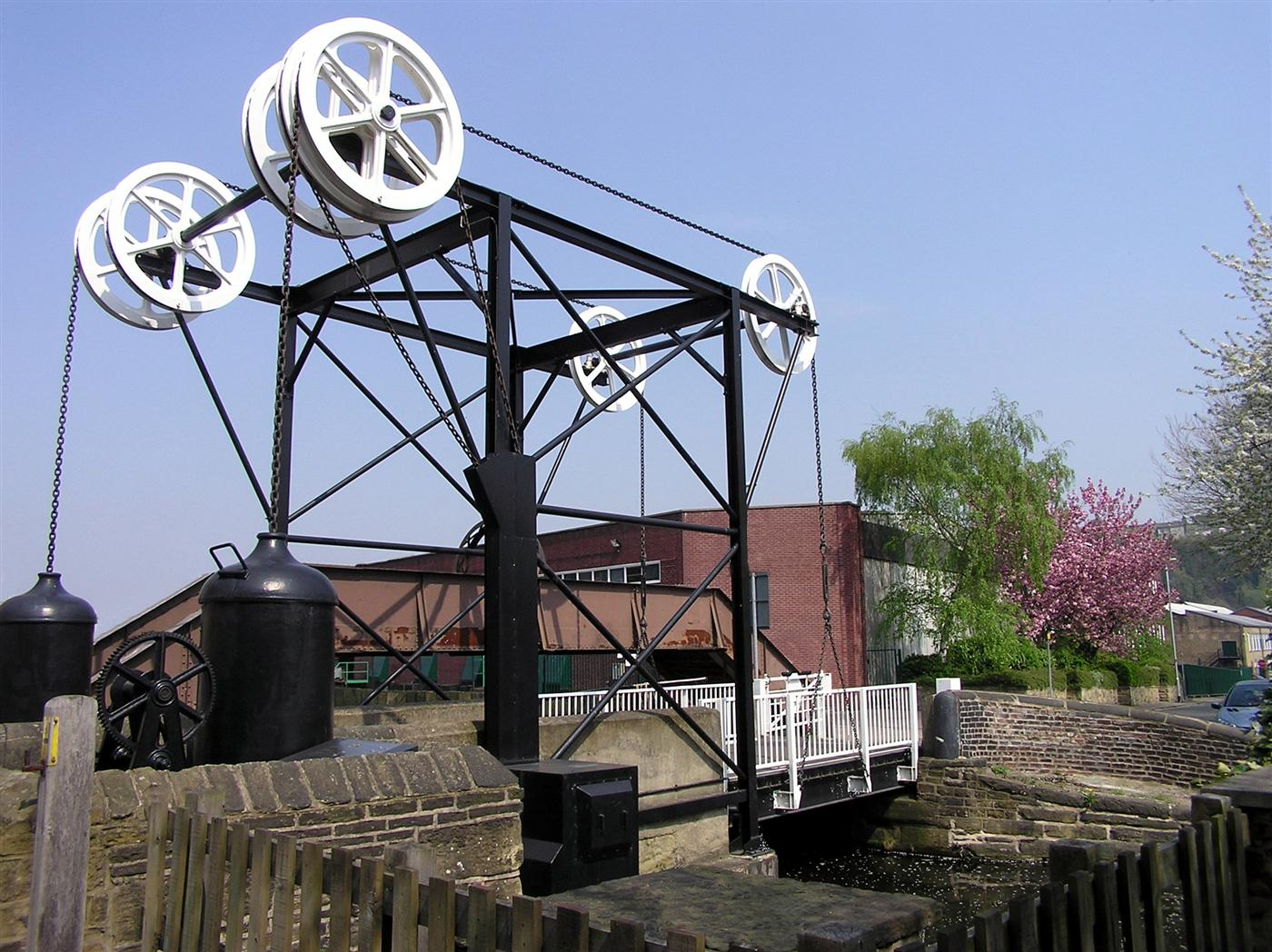
- Turnbridge Road Lift Bridge over Huddersfield Broad Canal
- Coordinates: 53°38′52″N 1°46′31″W
- Carries: Motor vehicles
- Crosses: Huddersfield Broad Canal
- Locale: Turnbridge, Kirklees, West Yorkshire, England
- Official name: Turnbridge Road Lift Bridge (No. 17)

Characteristics
- Design: vertical lift
- No. of spans: 1
- Piers in water: 2

History
- Opened: 1865

Location
- Interactive map of Turnbridge Lift Bridge

The Turnbridge Lift Bridge (also colloquially known as a Locomotive lift bridge) is a lift bridge which spans the Huddersfield Broad Canal at Turnbridge, Kirklees, West Yorkshire, England. Officially known as Turnbridge, it is bridge number 17 on the Huddersfield Broad Canal.

Located at Quay Street, off St Andrews road (approx 300 Yards from the town centre), it opened in 1865 and replaced an earlier swing bridge. A combination of wheels, chains and counter-weights were used to lift the deck of the bridge out of the way of passing canal barges.

Previously windlass operated, it was refurbished in 2002 and is now electrically powered.

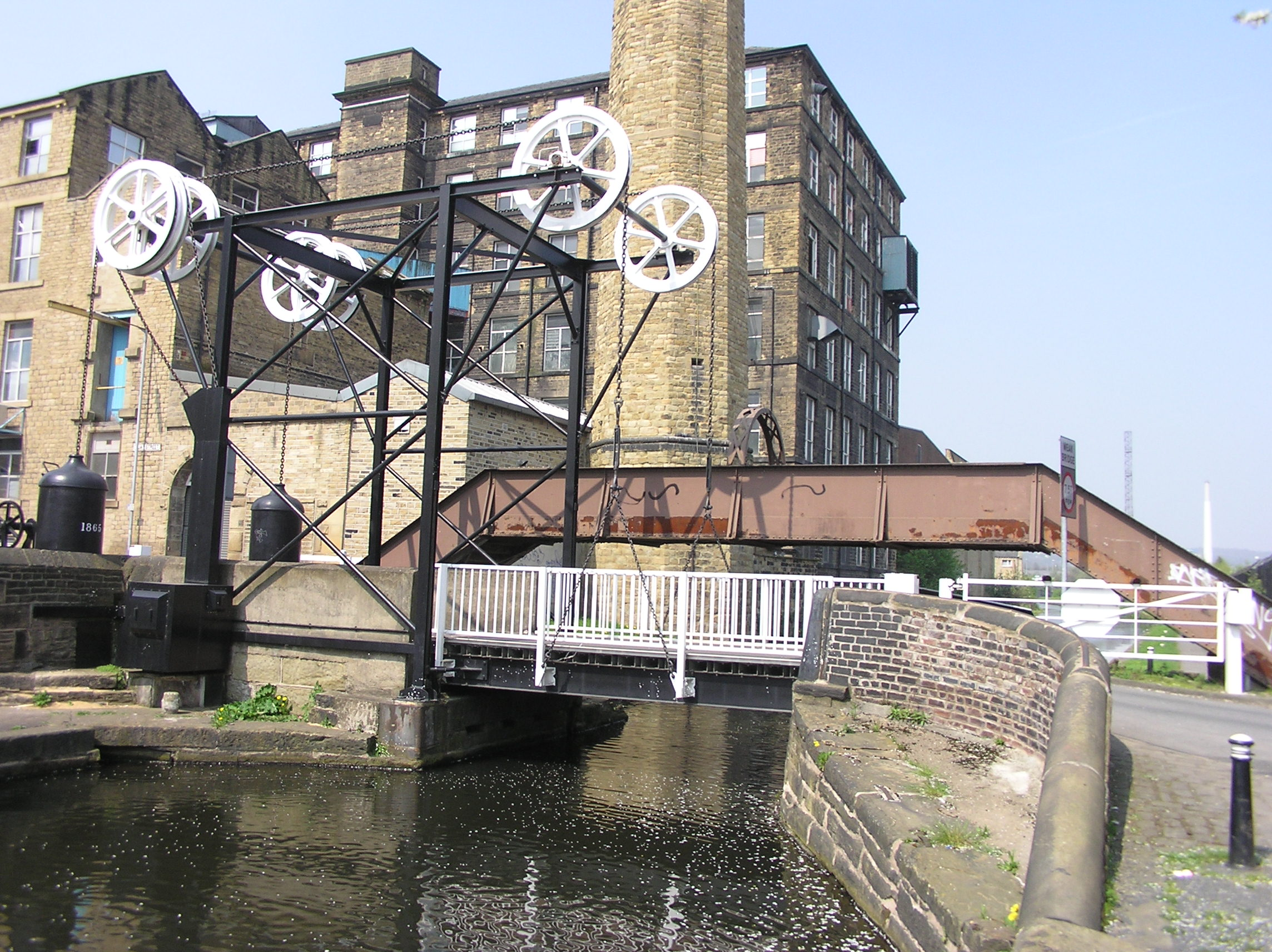
Viewed from Southern side of the Broad canal

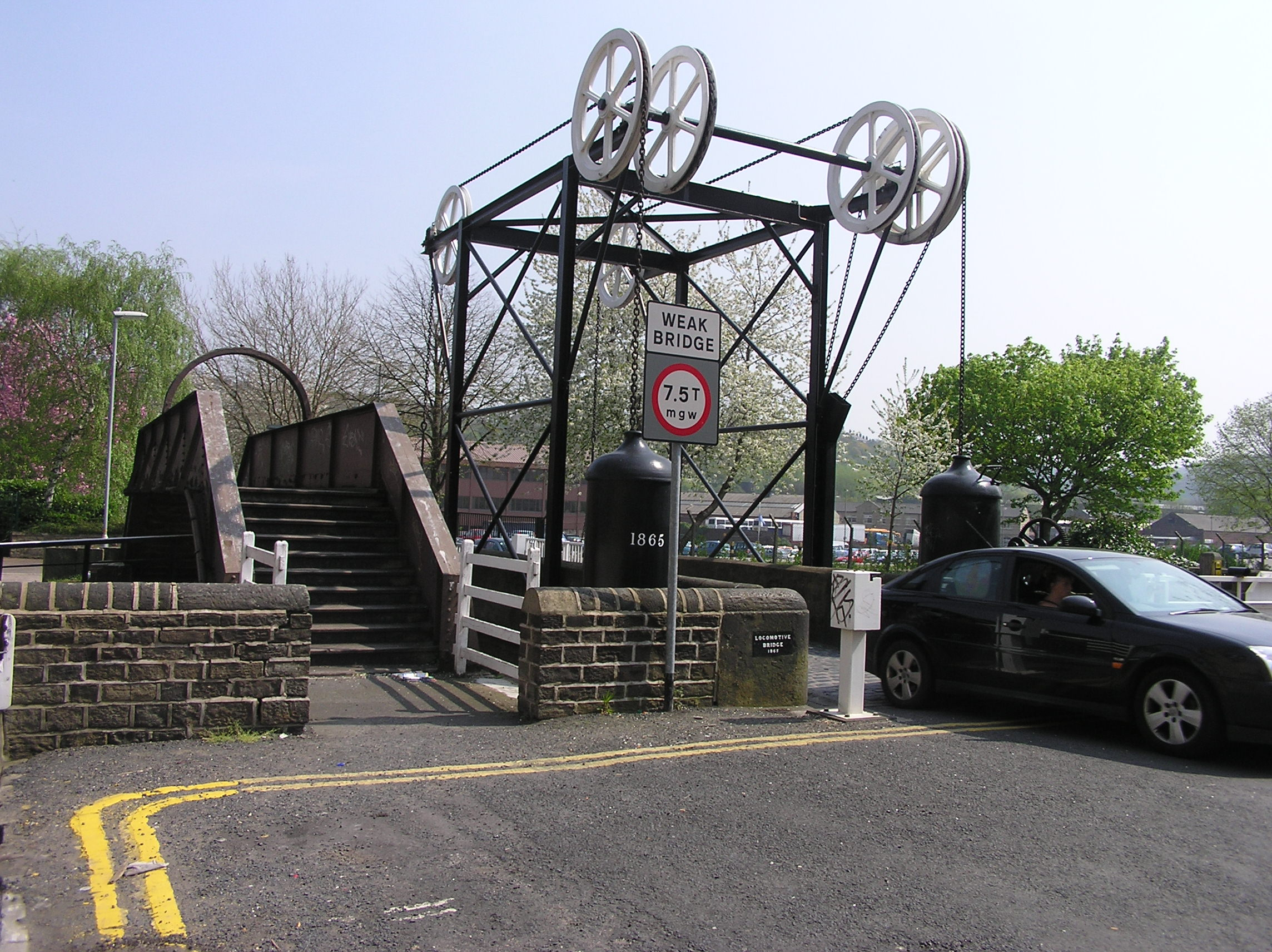
Car passing over the bridge towards Watergate

== See also ==
- List of Bridges for other notable bridges
