= Windlass =

Weightlifting device using pulleys

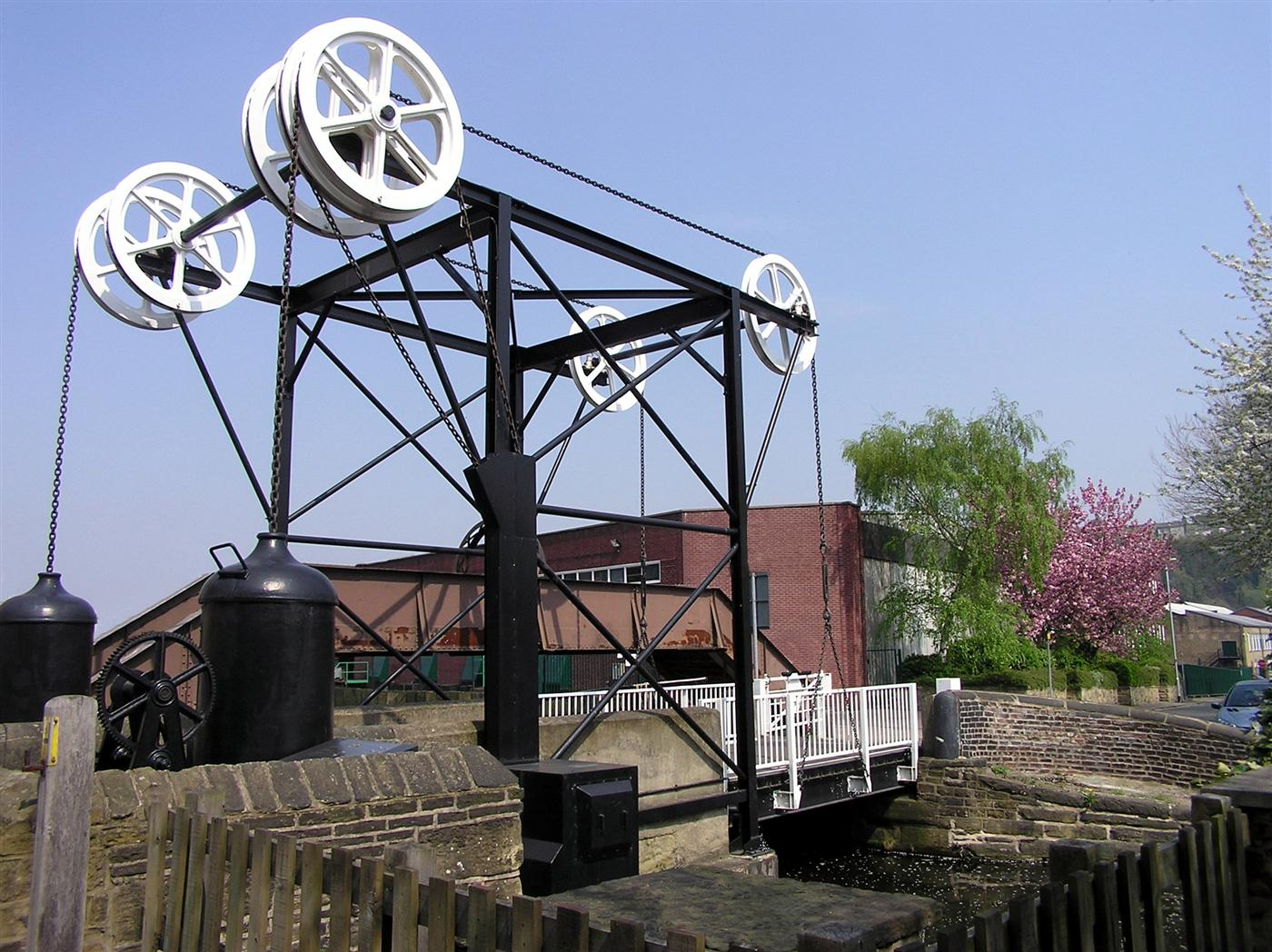
Turnbridge windlass lifting road bridge over Huddersfield Broad Canal

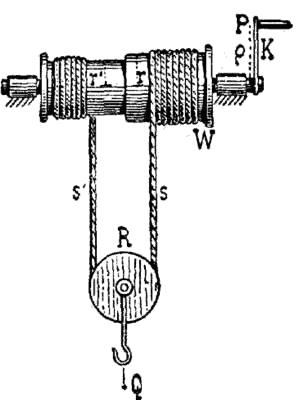
Differential windlass

The windlass /ˈwɪndləs/ is a type of horizontal winch used to move heavy weights, featuring a cylinder (barrel) operated by a crank to wind a rope. While the core mechanism is a simple winch, larger, historical, or maritime versions often include secondary pulling spools, or "winch heads," at the ends for handling multiple lines. The Greek scientist Archimedes was the inventor of the windlass. A surviving medieval windlass, dated to 1360 –1400, is in the Church of St Mary and All Saints, Chesterfield. The oldest depiction of a windlass for raising water can be found in the Book of Agriculture published in 1313 by the Chinese official Wang Zhen of the Yuan Dynasty (fl. 1290–1333).

== Uses ==
- Vitruvius, a military engineer writing about 28 BC, defined a machine as "a combination of timber fastened together, chiefly efficacious in moving great weights". About a century later, Hero of Alexandria summarized the practice of his day by naming the "five simple machines" for "moving a given weight by a given force" as the lever, windlass, screw for power, wedge, and tackle block (pulley). Until nearly the end of the nineteenth century it was held that these "five mechanical powers" were the building blocks from which all more complex assemblages were constructed.
- During the Middle Ages the windlass was used to raise materials for the construction of buildings such as in Chesterfield's crooked spire church.
- A windlass cocking mechanism on crossbows was used as early as 1215 in England, and most European crossbows had one by the Late Middle Ages.
- Windlasses are sometimes used on boats to raise the anchor as an alternative to a vertical capstan (see anchor windlass).
- The handle used to open locks on the UK's inland waterways is called a windlass.
- Windlasses can be used to raise water from a well. The oldest description of a well windlass, a rotating wooden rod installed across the mouth of a well, is found in Isidore of Seville's (c. 560–636) Origenes (XX, 15, 1–3).
- Windlasses have also been used in gold mining. A windlass would be constructed above a shaft which allowed heavy buckets to be hauled up to the surface. This process would be used until the shaft got below 40 metres deep, when the windlass would be replaced by a "whip" or a "whim".

== Differential windlass ==
Comparison of a differential pulley, or chain hoist, at left, and a differential windlass, or Chinese windlass, at right. The rope of the windlass is depicted as spirals for clarity, but it is typically helices with axes perpendicular to the image.

In a differential windlass, also called a Chinese windlass, there are two coaxial drums of different radii r and r′. The rope is wound onto one drum while it unwinds from the other, with a movable pulley hanging in the bight between the drums. Since each turn of the crank raises the pulley and attached weight by only π(r − r′), very large mechanical advantages can be obtained.

== Spanish windlass ==
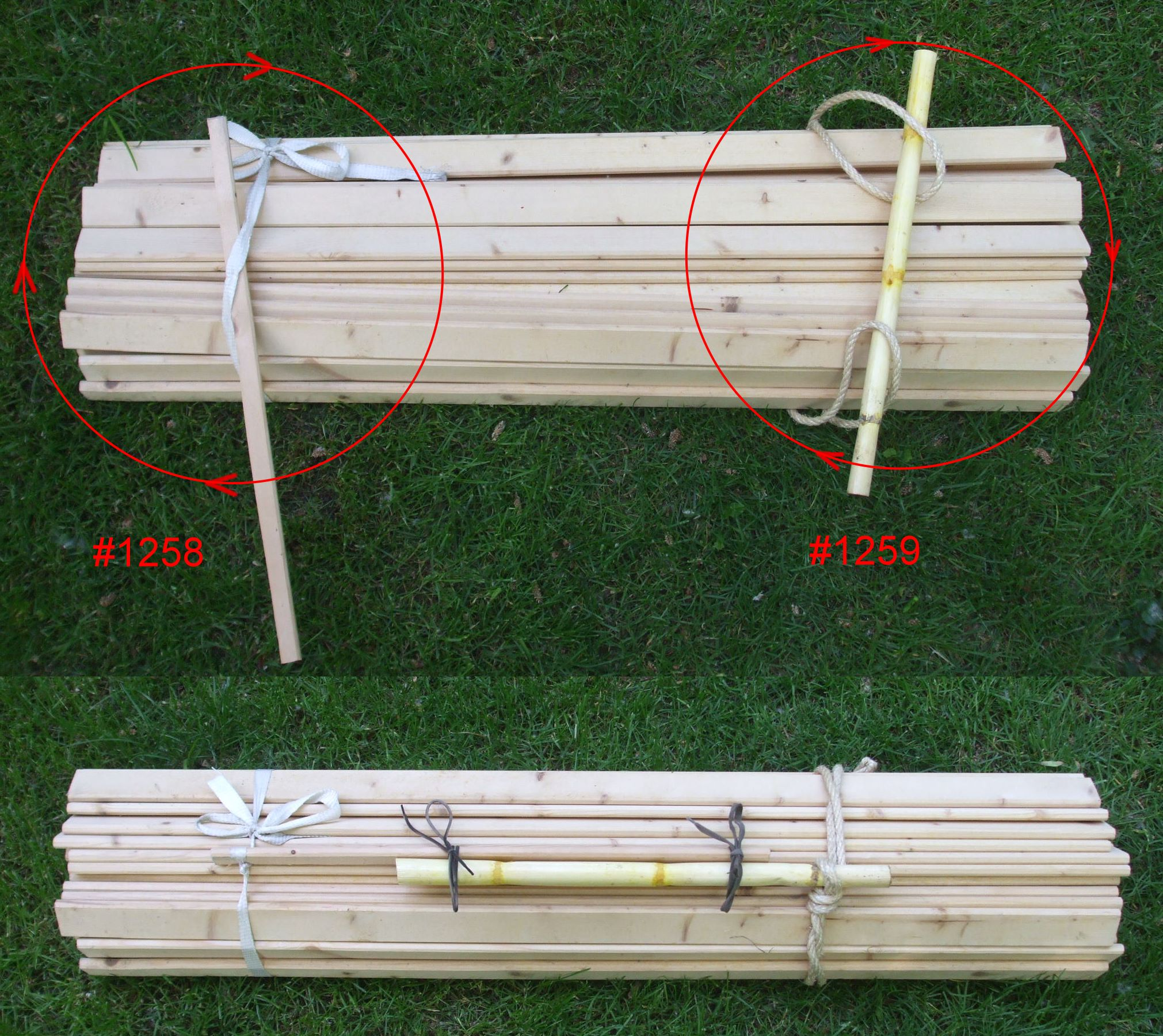
Two Spanish windlasses on a bunch of sticks, in the starting position and tightened

A Spanish windlass is a device for tightening a rope or cable by twisting it using a stick as a lever. The rope or cable is looped around two points so that it is fixed at either end. The stick is inserted into the loop and twisted, tightening the rope and pulling the two points toward each other. It is commonly used to move a heavy object such as a pipe or a post a short distance. It can be an effective device for pulling cars or cattle out of mud. A Spanish windlass is sometimes used to tighten a tourniquet or a straitjacket. A Spanish windlass trap can be used to kill small game. An 1898 report to the US Senate Committee on Foreign Relations about an American vessel captured by a Spanish gunboat described the Spanish windlass as a torture device. One of the captives' wrists were tied together. The captor then twisted a stick in the rope until it tightened and caused the man's wrists to swell.

== See also ==
- Differential pulley
- Hoist (device)
- Garrote, a weapon historically used for strangulation executions by affixing it to a stationary frame and operating it as a Spanish windlass around the executed person's neck
