= Huddersfield Narrow Canal Pylon =

Transmission tower in Tameside, Greater Manchester, England

Coordinates: 53°29′37″N 02°02′25″W

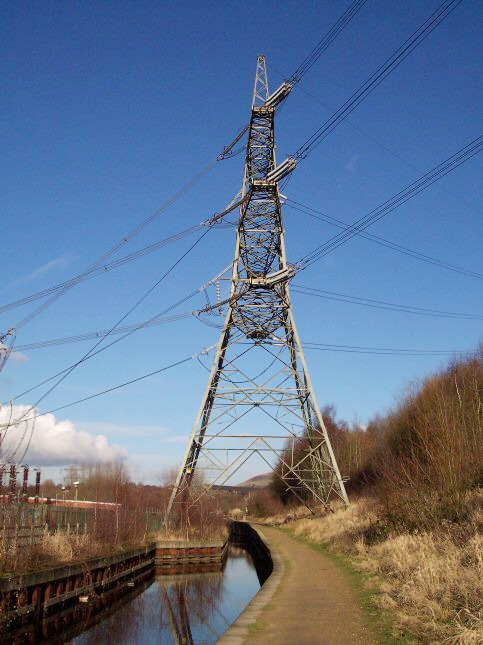
Huddersfield Stalybridge Canal Pylon

The Huddersfield Narrow Canal Pylon, (National Grid tower designation 4ZO251B), is a 54.6 metres (179 ft) tall electricity pylon which stands with its feet over the Huddersfield Narrow Canal near Heyrod, Stalybridge, Greater Manchester, England.

== History ==
The Stalybridge substation was built while the canal was closed to navigation, encroaching on the former canal line, and the canal was culverted at this point from the head of Lock 8W to a point immediately downstream of the substation. The extent of the former culvert can still be seen, as it was reused to form the lock bywash.

When the canal reopened, the channel was diverted slightly to the east to avoid the substation compound. However, its way was obstructed by a pylon, and it had to pass between the pylon's legs.

== Features ==
One side of the pylon carries the 400 kV Stalybridge–Thorpe Marsh circuit and the other a 275 kV Stalybridge transformer feeder circuit.

== See also ==
- Hartshead Power Station
