= Turnbridge =

Area in Huddersfield, West Yorkshire, England

Coordinates: 53.6478°N 1.7753°W

Turnbridge is the area to the east of Huddersfield town centre ring road in West Yorkshire, England. It forms a corridor along which passes St Andrews Road, (B6432), and the Huddersfield Broad Canal to Aspley, where the Broad Canal meets Huddersfield Narrow Canal in the Aspley Basin. There are places for a limited number of narrowboat moorings. Some have electric and fresh water services.

The area is reputed to have gained its name from a turning bridge across the canal. In 1865 this was replaced by Turnbridge Lift Bridge.

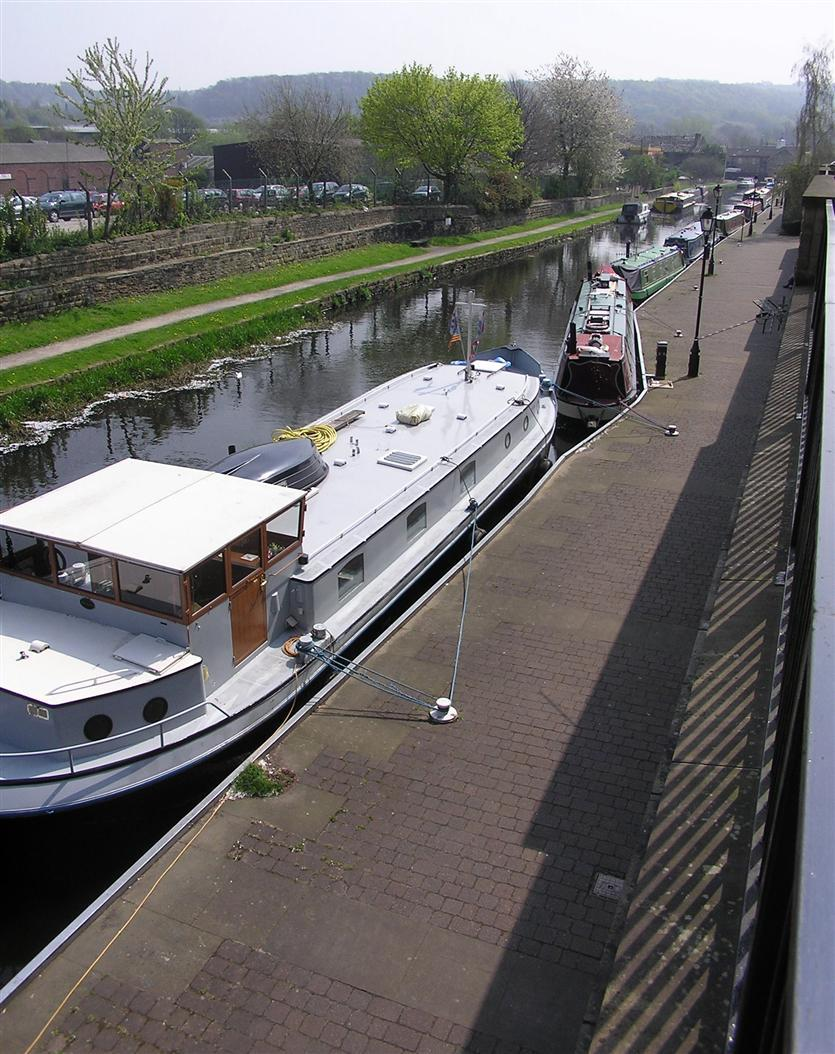
Turnbridge Section of Huddersfield Broad Canal

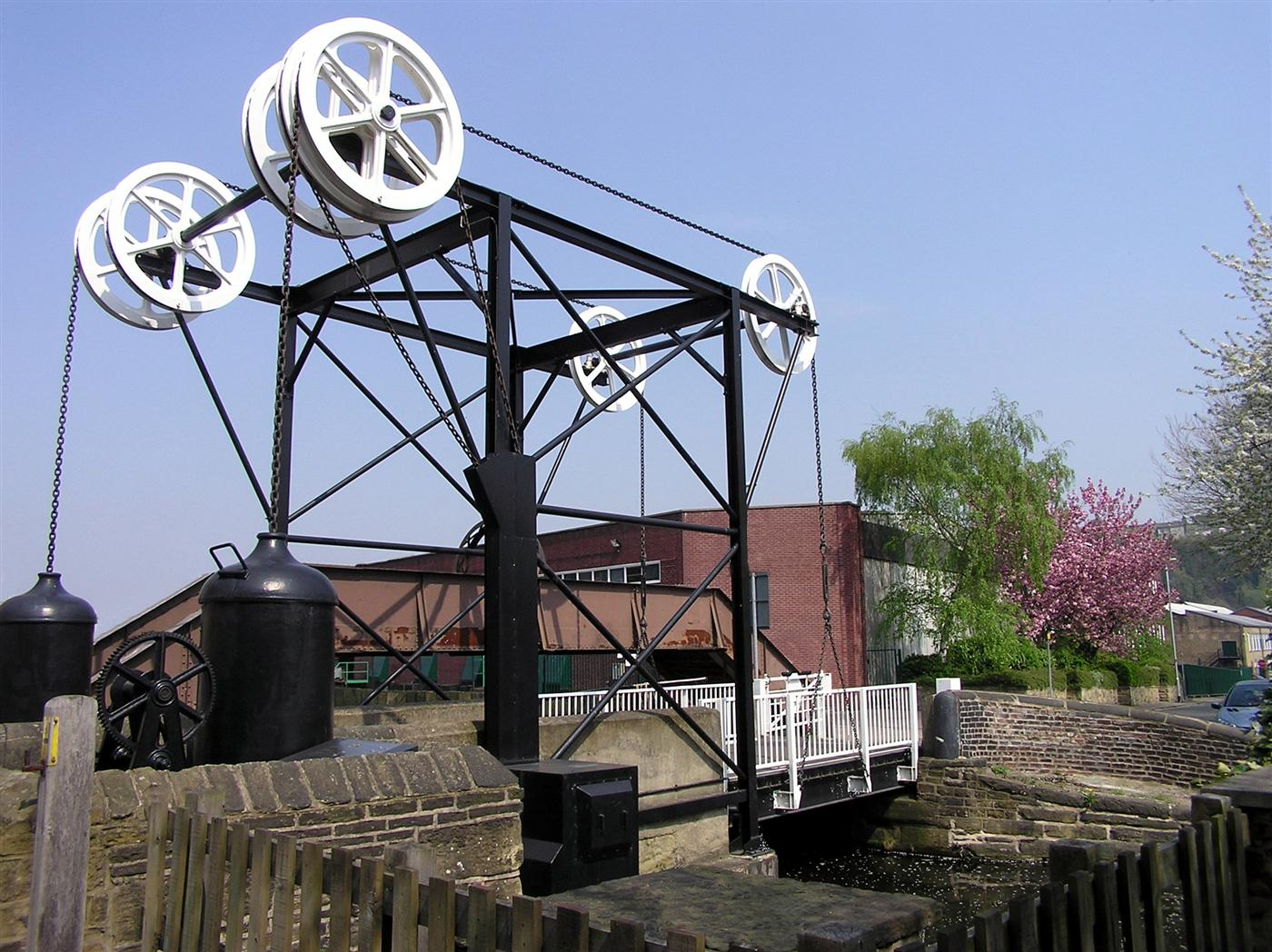
Turnbridge Lift Bridge over the Huddersfield Broad Canal
