= Hartshead Power Station =

Former coal-fired power station

- Official name: Hartshead Power Station
- Country: England
- Location: Greater Manchester, North West England
- Coordinates: 53.4978°N 2.0395°W
- Status: Decommissioned
- Commission date: 1926
- Decommission date: 29 October 1979
- Operators: Stalybridge, Hyde, Mossley & Dukinfield Transport & Electricity Board (1926–1948); British Electricity Authority (1948–1955); Central Electricity Authority (1955–1957); Central Electricity Generating Board (1958–1979)

Thermal power station
- Primary fuel: Coal
- Turbine technology: Steam turbines
- Chimneys: 2
- Cooling towers: 2
- Cooling source: Circulating water cooling towers

Power generation
- Units operational: 2 × 34 MW and 1 × 33.25 MW (1971)
- Nameplate capacity: 64 MW, 134.75 MW (1971)
- Annual net output: 251.911 GWh (1971)

Hartshead Power Station was a coal-fired power station situated at Heyrod, Greater Manchester in North West England.

== History ==
Preparations for a power station at Heyrod began in 1916 when 26 acres (110,000 m^{2}) of land were purchased. The station was opened in 1926 by the Stalybridge, Hyde, Mossley and Dukinfield Transport and Electricity Board. The station began operation with three Metropolitan-Vickers 12,500 kW turbo-alternators generating at the local SHMD supply frequency of 40 Hz. Later that year the station's output was changed to the nationally agreed standard of 50 Hz. In 1935, a major expansion of Hartshead began with the first of three new Metropolitan-Vickers 30,000 kW generating sets being commissioned, followed by the second set in 1943 and the third set in 1950.

The station's concrete cooling towers were constructed in the 1940s. Coal was delivered to the plant at Millbrook railway sidings on the Micklehurst Line, situated on the opposite side of the Huddersfield Narrow Canal. The sidings were built in 1932 and had space to hold up to 130 12-ton wagons. Coal was fed into a hopper underneath the sidings before being transported on an enclosed conveyor belt which emerged high above the valley to cross the River Tame and canal before entering the station at a high level.

The electricity output from Hartshead LP and HP power stations in the mid-1950s was:

Electricity sent out, GWh
Year	LP station output GWh	HP station output GWh
1953/4	45.31	434.42
1954/5	51.70	387.13
1955/6	46.33	270.83
1956/7	32.33	371.54
1957/8	15.84	368.59
1960/1	313.278	
1961/2	408.407	
1962/3	433.701	
1666/7	488.736	
1971/2	251.91	
1978/9	3.59	

It was partly converted to oil firing in the 1960s. By 1971 the boilers had a steam output capacity of 1.52 million pounds per hour (191.5 kg/s). Steam was produced at low pressure 275 psi and 357 °F (18.96 bar and 181 °C) and at high pressure 615/620 psi and 443/449 °F (42.4/42.7 bar and 228/232 °C). In 1971 the generating plant comprised two 34 MW and one 33.25 MW turbo-alternators and the station had a rated capacity of 134.75 MW.

The station was closed on 29 October 1979 with a generating capacity of 64 megawatts. It was demolished September 24, 1989, although part of the site is still used as an electrical substation.

== See also ==
- Huddersfield Narrow Canal Pylon
