= SHMD Joint Board =

English power and transport company

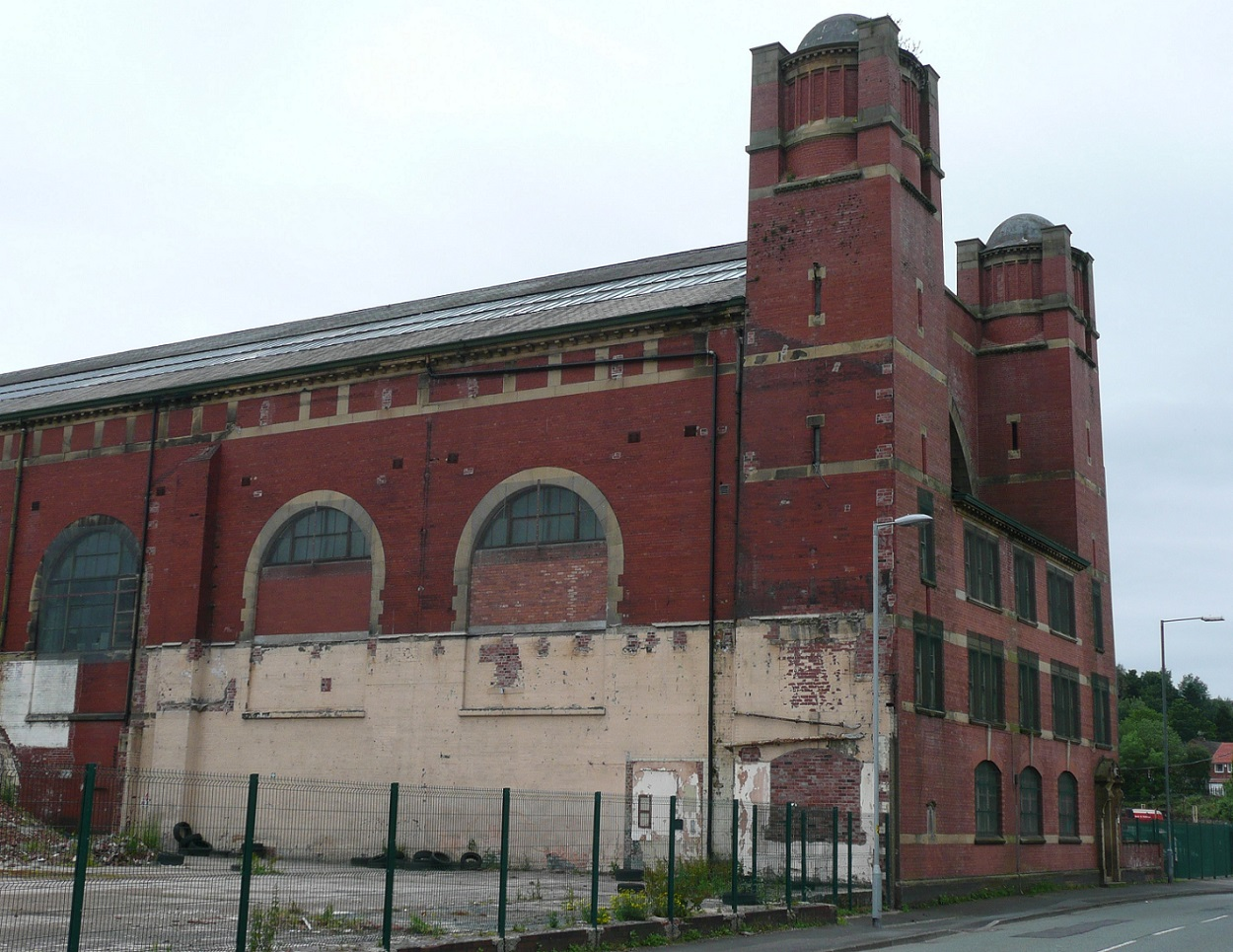
Former electric generating station on Park Road, Stalybridge

Map of tramways in Tameside including all SHMD routes

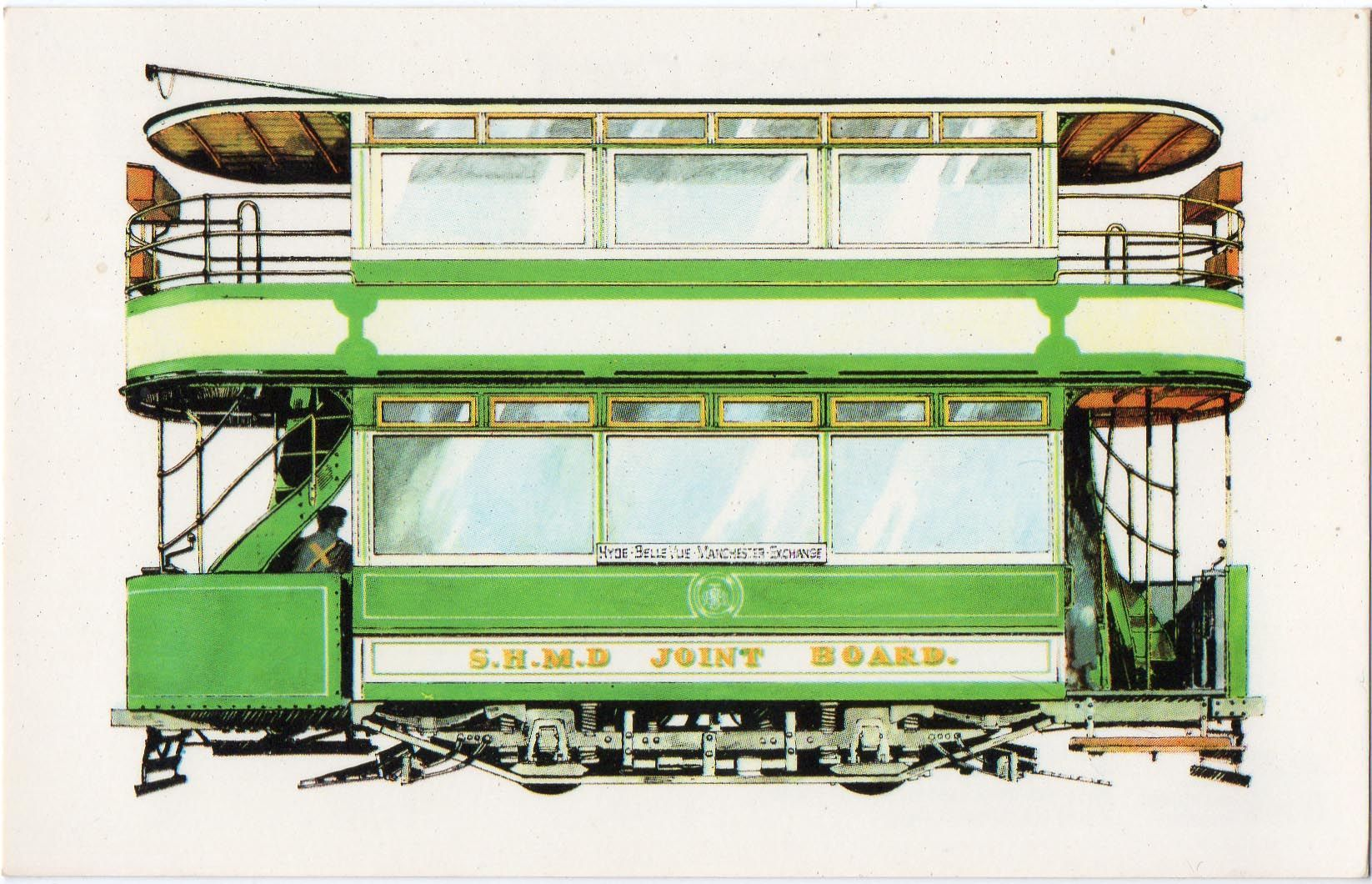
Postcard of a SHMD green and cream tram

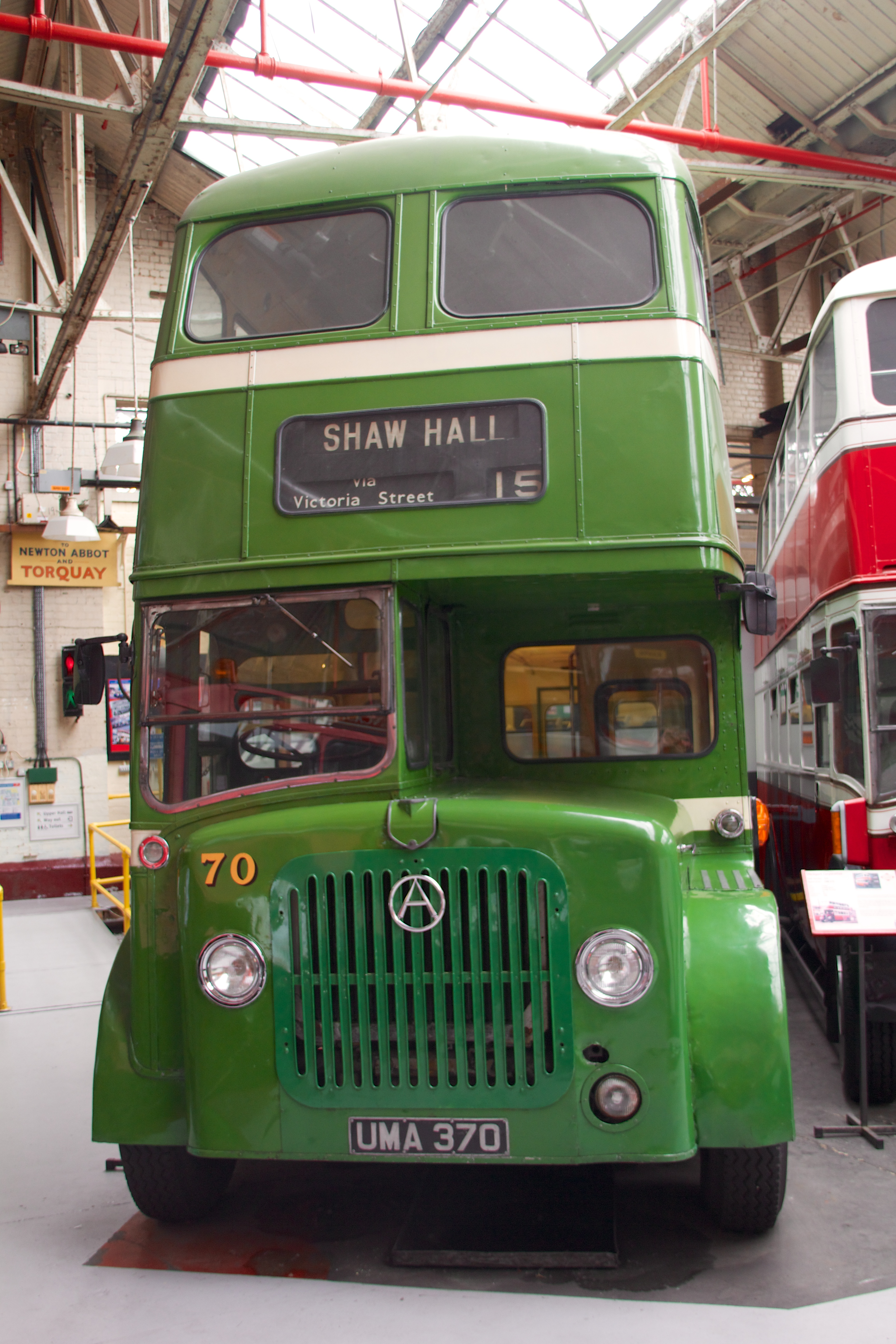
SHMD bus 70 at the Museum of Transport, Greater Manchester

Stalybridge, Hyde, Mossley and Dukinfield Tramways and Electricity Board (SHMD) was a public transport and electricity supply organisation formed by the Stalybridge, Hyde, Mossley and Dukinfield Tramway and Electricity Board Act 1901 (1 Edw. 7. c. cxcv) in August 1901. It was a joint venture between the borough councils of Stalybridge, Hyde, Mossley and Dukinfield. The system was officially opened on 21 May 1904.

== The tramway network ==
At its inception, the scheme included 21 route miles of tramway and a fleet of forty tramcars. The network was later extended to 27 route miles with a fleet of sixty tramcars. The rails were rolled by Bolckow, Vaughan & Co, Middlesbrough. The points and crossings were made by Hadfield's Steel Foundry Co, Sheffield. The main tram shed was on Park Road, Stalybridge adjacent to the Tame Valley generating station. Smaller tram sheds were also built in Hyde and Mossley.

== The rolling stock ==
The British Westinghouse Co was the lead contractor for the first forty tram cars, supplying much of their electrical and mechanical equipment. The car bodies were sub contracted to the British Electric Car Co, Trafford Park, with bogies from the McGuire Manufacturing Co, Bury and wheel sets from the British Griffin Chilled Iron Co, Barrow in Furness.

== Generating and distribution network ==
The Tame Valley generating station consisted of three Yates and Thom, 815 hp, vertical triple expansion steam engines. Each engine drove a Dick, Kerr & Co. 500 kW 60 pole alternator at 80 RPM, giving a three-phase output of 6,000 V at 40 Hz. The station's six Lancashire boilers were supplied by Tinker, Shenton & Co, of Hyde. Most of the electrical switchgear was supplied by Witting, Eborall & Co. Power from the station was distributed at 6,000 V via specially made three-core cables drawn through glazed earthenware underground conduits. Each of the four SHMD towns had its own substation consisting of two synchronous motor-generators, each rated at 200 kW, converting the 6,000 V three-phase input into an output of 525 V DC to feed the overhead tram wires and 460 V (±230 V) three-wire DC for lighting circuits. The Tame Valley generating station remained in use until 1932, after which the building was used as a workshop and stores. In 1926, the new Hartshead Power Station was opened by the SHMD board.

== Later history ==
The Stalybridge, Hyde, Mossley and Dukinfield Transport and Electricity Board Act 1936 (26 Geo. 5 & 1 Edw. 8. c. lxvi) changed the organisation's name to the Stalybridge, Hyde, Mossley and Dukinfield Transport and Electricity Board due to most of its tramways being replaced by first trolley buses then motor buses. The last SHMD tram ran in 1945.

For a number of years after this, the main bus routes were operated by electrically powered trolleybuses, which did not run on rails but on rubber-tyred wheels and obtained their power from a pair of trolley wires, each bus having two trolley poles held up against these trolley wires by springs. If these poles jumped off the wires, the conductor would retrieve a long bamboo pole from a sheath on the side of the trolley bus and use it to replace the trolley poles on to the trolley wires. Whilst the SHMD Board owned the trolleybus overhead within its area, it did not operate any trolleybuses; these were provided by the neighbouring undertakings of Ashton-under-Lyne and Manchester Corporation. The board continued to operate motor buses on routes that had not been served by tram.

In 1948, the SHMD electricity interests were nationalised, with the board's electricity distribution assets being incorporated into Norweb. The Hartshead Power Station became part of the British Electricity Authority, the predecessor of the Central Electricity Generating Board, and remained in use until 1979. Norweb continued to use the former Tame Valley generating station building as a maintenance depot until 1984, after which it was sold to Beck & Politzer who continue to use it as a workshop. The Grade II listed Thorn House, the former SHMD head office near to Stalybridge bus station, was used for many years by Norweb as an area office and showroom before being sold and converted into flats.

Following the nationalisation of its electricity interests SHMD continued to operate bus services until 1969, when it was absorbed into SELNEC. However, its origins in the electrical transport and electricity generation to power the trams and trolleys meant that the affectionate name of “Joint Board” was not lost entirely.

The standard livery of the SHMD fleet was green and cream.
