= Heyrod =

Village in Tameside, Greater Manchester, England

Coordinates: 53.497°N 2.045°W

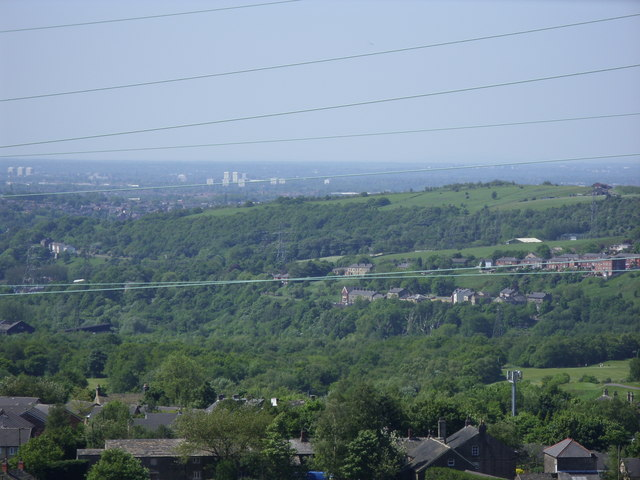
- A view over Heyrod

- Location within Greater Manchester
- OS grid reference: SD970000
- Metropolitan borough: Tameside
- Metropolitan county: Greater Manchester
- Region: North West
- Country: England
- Sovereign state: United Kingdom
- Post town: STALYBRIDGE
- Postcode district: SK15
- Dialling code: 0161
- Police: Greater Manchester
- Fire: Greater Manchester
- Ambulance: North West
- UK Parliament: Stalybridge and Hyde

Heyrod (/ˈhɛrəd/) is a village in Tameside, Greater Manchester, England, between Stalybridge and Mossley. Historically in Lancashire, Heyrod was subsumed into the Municipal Borough of Stalybridge in 1881, a local government district which became part of the administrative county of Cheshire in 1889.

Heyrod is the site of the former Hartshead Power Station.

There is a village hall.

== See also ==
- Huddersfield Narrow Canal Pylon
