= Huddersfield Broad Canal =

Navigation canal in West Yorkshire, England

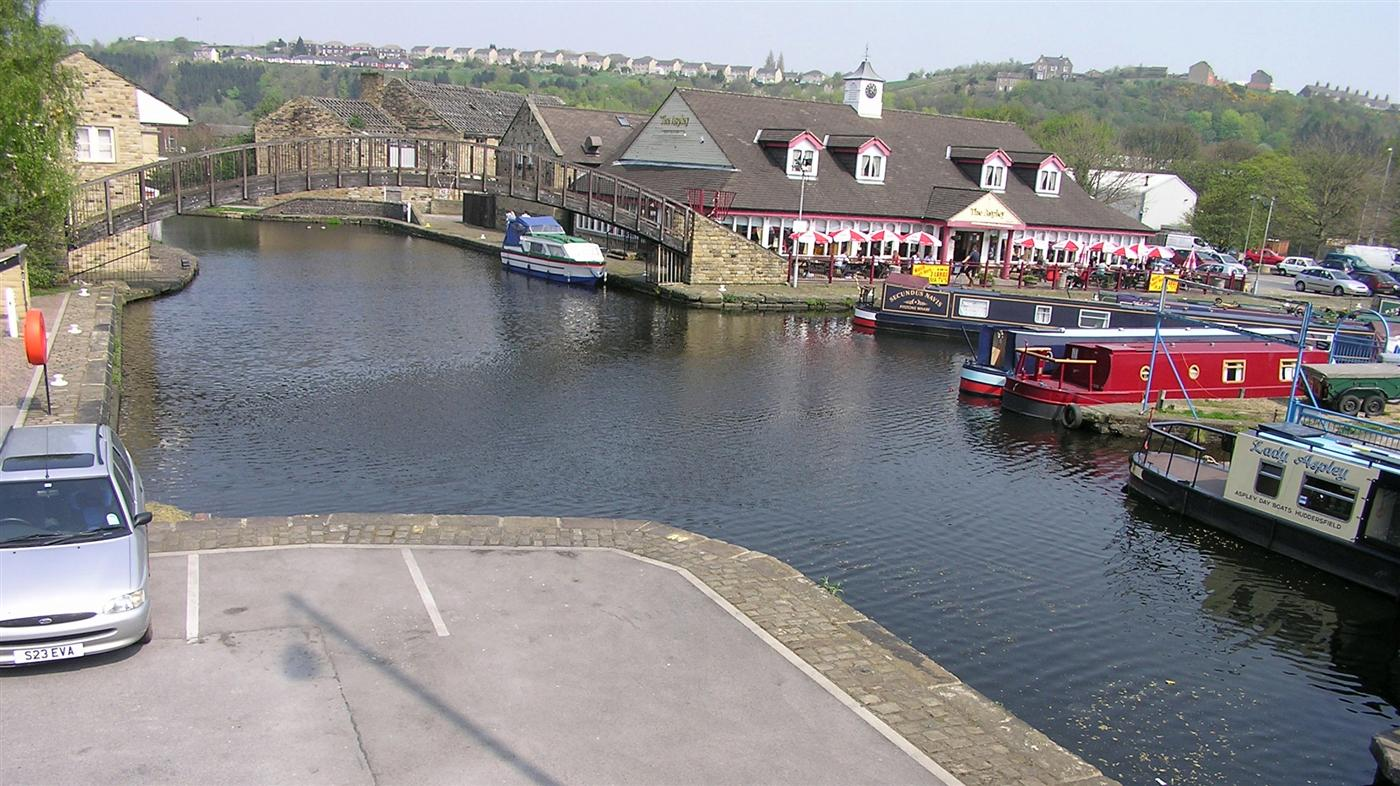
- Aspley Basin, near the junction between the Broad and Narrow canals
- Interactive map of Huddersfield Broad Canal

Specifications
- Maximum boat length: 57 ft 6 in (17.53 m)
- Maximum boat beam: 14 ft 2 in (4.32 m)
- Locks: 9
- Status: operational
- Navigation authority: Canal & River Trust

History
- Date of act: 1774
- Date completed: 1776

Geography
- Start point: Cooper Bridge Junction
- End point: Huddersfield
- Connects to: Calder and Hebble Navigation, Huddersfield Narrow Canal

The Huddersfield Broad Canal or Sir John Ramsden's Canal, is a wide-locked navigable canal in West Yorkshire in northern England. The waterway is 3.75 miles (6 km) long and has 9 wide locks. It follows the valley of the River Colne and connects the Calder and Hebble Navigation at Cooper Bridge junction with the Huddersfield Narrow Canal near Aspley Basin in Huddersfield.

Construction was authorised in 1774, and the canal opened two years later. It became part of a trans-Pennine route in 1811 when the Huddersfield Narrow Canal joined it at Aspley Basin. Traffic was hampered by the long narrowboats used on the narrow canal that could not use Ramsden's Canal's shorter locks. Goods were transhipped at Aspley Basin, and although shorter narrowboats were built, its success as a trans-Pennine route was overshadowed by the Rochdale Canal which had wide locks throughout and joined the Calder and Hebble Navigation at Sowerby Bridge. The canal passed into railway ownership in 1845, but prospered into the 20th century. Railway ownership ceased in 1945, when it was bought by the Calder and Hebble Navigation, at which point the narrow canal across the Pennines was abandoned. The broad canal carried commercial traffic, particularly coal for power stations, until 1953.

After the formation of British Waterways in 1962, the canal was designated a cruiseway in 1968, which meant that it was mainly for leisure traffic. Use of the canal has increased significantly since the Huddersfield Narrow Canal re-opened in 2001, as it is no longer a dead end. Many of its structures have been given listed building status, in recognition of their historic importance.

== History ==
The canal appears to have been planned for some time before it was authorised, as the Calder and Hebble Navigation obtained an act of Parliament, the Calder and Hebble Navigation Act 1757 (31 Geo. 2. c. 72), for its canal in 1758, which included a clause to prevent interference with any future navigation "from the Mouth of the River Coln to the town of Huddersfield". In 1766, Robert Whitworth surveyed a route for such a canal, and the Calder and Hebble Navigation Act 1769 (9 Geo. 3. c. 71) contained a similar clause. A second survey was carried out in 1773 by Luke Holt and Joseph Atkinson for the Ramsden family, who owned the whole of Huddersfield at the time and keen to develop the canal. The family also owned roughly one-third of the land along the proposed route of the canal. Holt had worked on the construction of the Calder and Hebble above Cooper Bridge.

Atkinson presented evidence for the bill to the parliamentary committee, being somewhat less than truthful when he stated that Huddersfield was 'the only market for narrow woolen cloths' in the West Riding of Yorkshire. The estimated cost of its construction was £8,000, and it was expected to take one year to complete. Profits were limited by the act, which stipulated that the tolls must be cut as the profits increased. Commissioners were to be appointed, with powers to examine the canal accounts and ensure compliance. In order to prevent water drawn by the canal from interfering with the operation of local mills, the upper 1.5 miles (2.4 km) were made deeper than the rest of the canal, to provide a reservoir of water.

=== Construction ===
Calder Canal Act 1774
- Act of Parliament
- Parliament of Great Britain
- Long title: An Act for enabling Sir John Ramsden Baronet, to make and maintain a navigable Canal, from the River Colder (between a Bridge called Cooper's Bridge and the Mouth of the River Colne) to The King’s Mill, near the Town of Huddersfield, in the West Riding of the County of York.
- Citation: 14 Geo. 3. c. 13
- Territorial extent: Great Britain

Dates
- Royal assent: 9 March 1774
- Commencement: 13 January 1774 (Note: Start of session.)
Other legislation
Amended by	Huddersfield and Manchester Railway and Canal Act 1845; London and North Western Railway Act 1847

Status: Amended

Text of statute as originally enacted

The canal was authorised by an act of Parliament, the Calder Canal Act 1774 (14 Geo. 3. c. 13), obtained on 9 March 1774, which enabled "Sir John Ramsden, Baronet, to make and maintain a navigable Canal from the River Calder, between a Bridge called Cooper's Bridge, and the Mouth of the River Colne to the King's Mill, near the town of Huddersfleld, in the West Riding of the county of York". Sir John was Lord of the Manor of Huddersfield, and proprietor of the Ramsden Estate that owned much of the town.

Although a connection to the River Colne at Huddersfield was authorised by the act, the upper terminus was a basin at Apsley, where Ramsden built wharves and warehouses. From the basin it descended 57.3 feet (17.5 m) over a distance of 3.75 miles (6 km), to its junction with the Calder and Hebble Navigation at Cooper Bridge.

The canal opened in 1776, having cost £11,975, although this total included some maintenance costs. Water was taken from the River Colne and fed into the canal from the tail goit of Shaw Foot Mill until it was supplied by the Huddersfield Narrow Canal after it opened in 1811.

=== Operation ===
The canal prospered, and in 1788, a regular service transporting goods between Huddersfield and Wakefield was operating three times a week. During the 1790s, goods were carried over the Pennines by road, with one service, operated by Richard Milnes, connecting Manchester to Huddersfield. In 1796, he operated daily sailings onwards from Huddersfield to Wakefield, where the Calder and Hebble Navigation connected to the Aire and Calder Navigation, on which there was a daily connection to Hull. Just a year later, he operated one or more boats a day between the upper terminus of the Calder and Hebble at Sowerby Bridge and Hull, while the service from Huddersfield to Wakefield reverted to three times a week. At the time, the construction of the broad Rochdale Canal was making progress towards Sowerby Bridge, while the Huddersfield Narrow Canal was struggling with the excavation of Standedge Tunnel, the longest, deepest and highest on the English canal system. The Rochdale Canal provided a trans-Pennine route from 1804, and Sowerby Bridge remained more important than Huddersfield, even after the Huddersfield Narrow opened throughout in 1811.

The Huddersfield Narrow Canal provided a heavily-locked western connection to the wool-weaving towns of the upper Colne valley, (Golcar, Linthwaite, Slaithwaite, and Marsden) and across the Pennines to Saddleworth, Stalybridge and Manchester via Standedge Tunnel. It was never particularly successful, and Ramsden's Canal was seen almost as a branch of the Calder and Hebble, with links to Yorkshire, rather than Lancashire. The Calder and Hebble brought prosperity to the area, and Ramsden's Canal shared in it. The Narrow Canal was hampered by the need to tranship cargoes at Huddersfield. Their boats were 70 by 7 feet (21.3 by 2.1 m), the same as those on the connecting Ashton Canal and Peak Forest Canal at the Manchester end. However, they were too long to fit through the shorter locks of Ramsden's Canal and the Calder and Hebble. In 1812 they built a 57.5-foot (17.5 m) narrowboat, which could work through to Wakefield, but it carried a smaller cargo. The company tried unsuccessfully to get the Calder and Hebble to extend their locks to cater for longer boats. Had they succeeded, locks on Ramsden's Canal would have needed lengthening.

=== Railway ownership ===
Huddersfield and Manchester Railway and Canal Act 1845
- Act of Parliament
- Parliament of the United Kingdom
- Long title: An Act for making a Railway from the Sheffield, Ashton-under-Lyne, and Manchester Railway at Stalybridge to the Manchester and Leeds Railway at Kirkheaton, with a Branch therefrom; and for consolidating into One Undertaking the said proposed Railway and the Huddersfield Canal Navigation.
- Citation: 8 & 9 Vict. c. cv
- Territorial extent: United Kingdom

Dates
- Royal assent: 21 July 1845
- Commencement: 21 July 1845 (Note: The Acts of Parliament (Commencement) Act 1793.)
Other legislation
Amends	Calder Canal Act 1774; Huddersfield to Ashton-under-Lyne Canal Act 1794

Status: Current legislation

The canal passed into railway ownership in 1845 when it was bought by the Huddersfield and Manchester Railway and Canal Company for £46,560. The company was incorporated in 1845 and had already the Huddersfield Narrow Canal primarily to aid in the construction of a cross-Pennine rail link at Standedge. The railway company became part of the London and North Western Railway (LNWR) by the London and North Western Railway Act 1846 (9 & 10 Vict. c. cciv), and the negotiations leading up to that meant that shareholders received 70 per cent of the dividends paid on shares in the LNWR.

In the year of the LNWR takeover, the canal carried 120,207 tons of cargo, but this gradually declined. An attempted revival of trade to Manchester in 1856, spearheaded by the Aire and Calder Navigation after a railway company took over the Rochdale Canal, foundered when the LNWR created obstacles to using Standedge Tunnel. The Aire and Calder negotiated the expansion of Huddersfield Wharf in 1872, and leased the original and extended wharves in 1873, installing hydraulic hoists two years later. At around this time, the LNWR began selling canal water, reportedly 200,000 imperial gallons (0.91 Ml) per day according to the Huddersfield Chronicle. Trade held up well, with some 75,000 tons passing between the Calder and Hebble and Ramsden's Canal in the 1890s, of which about one quarter transferred to the Huddersfield Narrow Canal. By 1905, this had fallen to 54,580, of which one fifth passed onto the narrow canal.

=== The leisure era ===
The Calder and Hebble Canal company bought Ramsden's Canal on 1 January 1945, in an agreement with the London, Midland and Scottish Railway company. They paid £4,000 which included a short length of the Narrow Canal, and the rest of that canal was abandoned. The canal was used to carry coal to a power station, and was used by some 80 barges each month. Along with most of the operating British canals, it was nationalised on 1 January 1948. The coal traffic ended in October 1953, and was the last commercial traffic to use the canal. With the passing of the Transport Act 1962 responsibility passed from the British Transport Commission to British Waterways. Under the terms of the Transport Act 1968, the canal was classified as a cruiseway, meaning that it had a future for leisure use. In 2012, responsibility passed to the Canal and River Trust.

== Current state ==
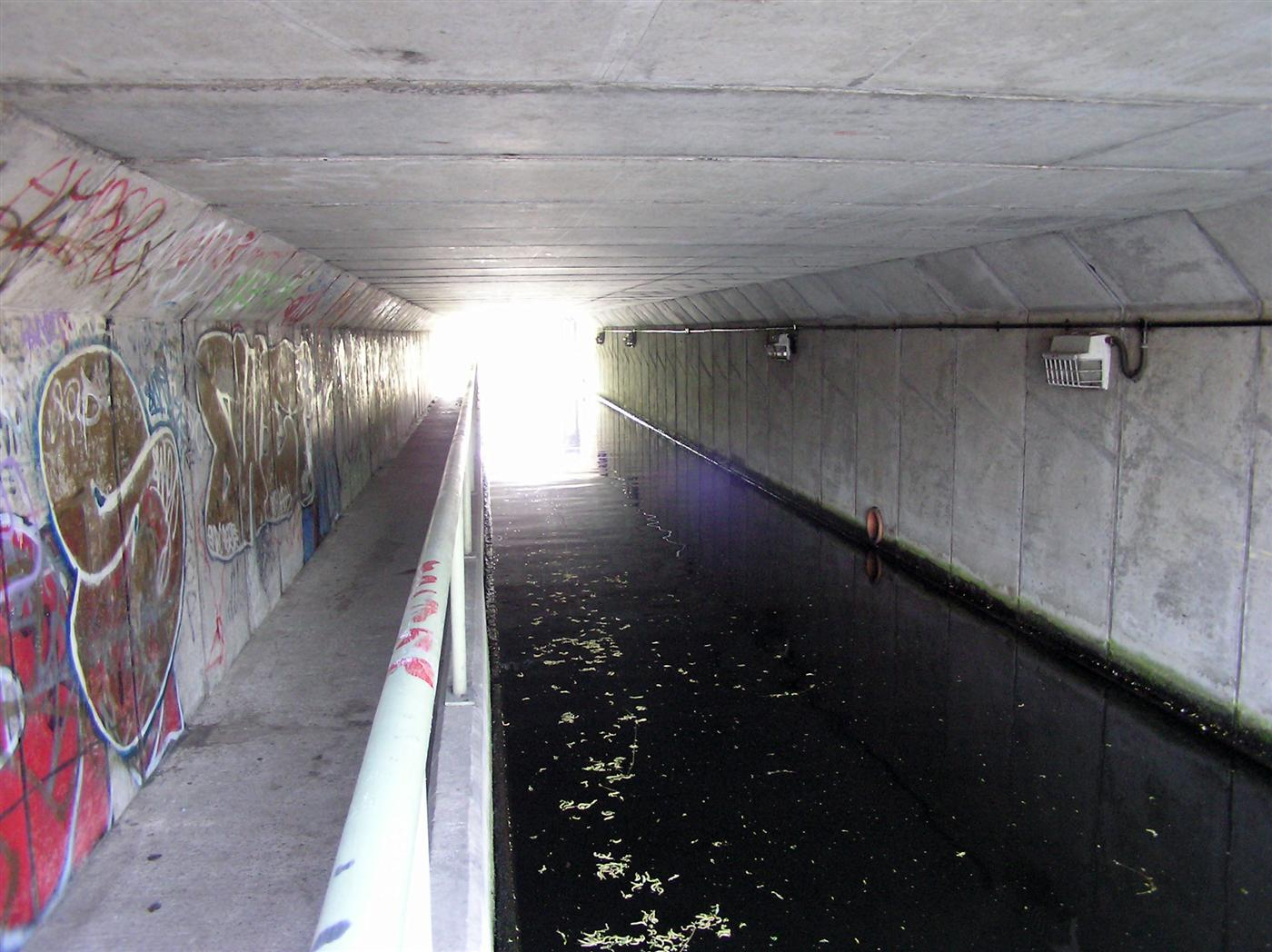
Wakefield Road tunnel

The broad canal has been used much more since the re-opening of the Huddersfield Narrow Canal in 2001, as it is no longer a dead end, but part of one of three cross-Pennine through-routes. This has resulted in better maintenance of the channel and locks. There is a card-operated pumpout machine at Aspley Basin, and mooring points have fresh water and electric services.

The Huddersfield Broad Canal made its original connection with the Huddersfield Narrow Canal to the west of the A629 Wakefield Road. Following strengthening work to Wakefield Road, which included the construction of a reinforced concrete tunnel under the original bridge, this short section is no longer navigable to vessels wider than 7 feet (2.1 m). Although British Waterways has not officially redesignated it, the Wakefield Road tunnel now effectively forms the end of the Huddersfield Broad Canal.

== Route ==
Just above Coopers Bridge, the Calder and Hebble enters a lock cut through a floodgate. The route to Ramsden's Canal follows the main course of the river, passing under the bridge which carries the A62 road over the river. A large weir is directly ahead, protected by a boom, and the first lock is on the right, just above it. The lock is a grade II listed structure, dating from the building of the canal, although a dated kerbstone indicates that it was modified in 1899. The adjacent lock keepers cottage, which is built of hammer-dressed stone, with two storeys and a stone slate roof, dates from the early or mid 19th century, and is also a listed structure. The canal turns to the south west to run parallel to the River Colne, and passes under a railway bridge to reach the Clone Bridge Lock. Just above it is a hammer-dressed stone warehouse, dating from the 18th century, followed by an arched bridge which carries Colne Bridge Road over the canal. A datestone indicates that it was built in 1775.

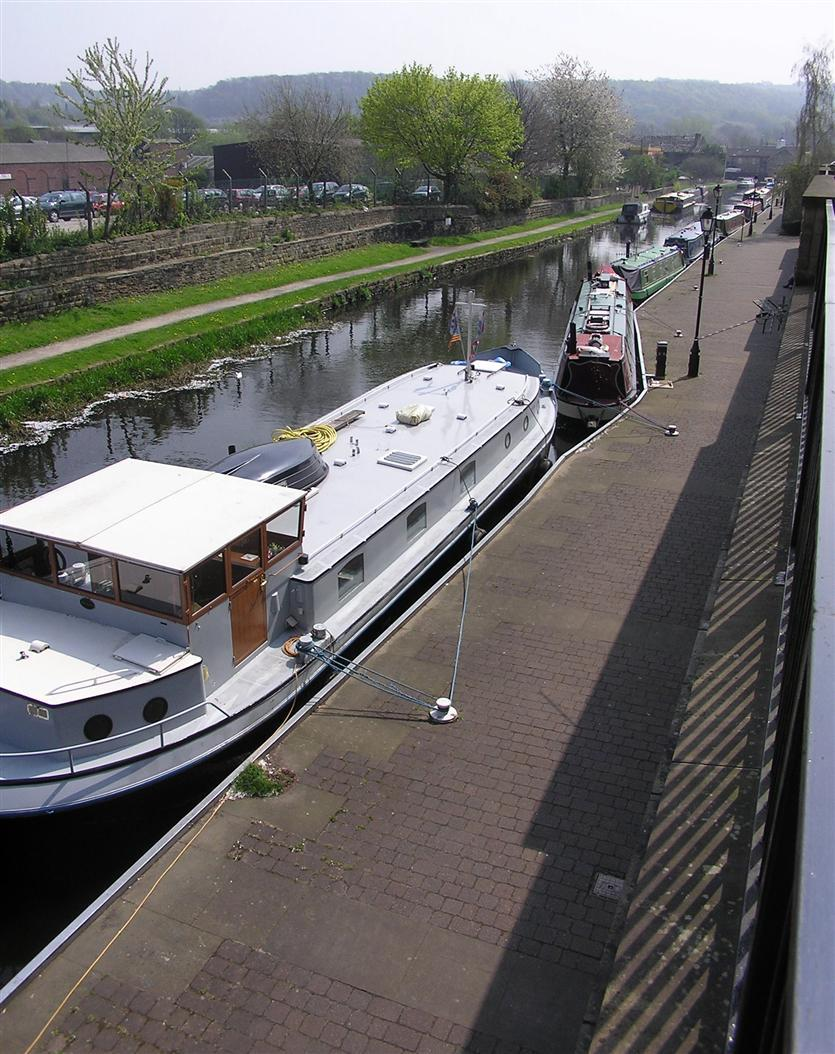
Mooring section between Aspley and Turnbridge

Pipelines cross the canal at Colliery Bridge, which is followed by Ladgrave Lock, with a hammer-dressed stone bridge over its tail. The canal is flanked by industrial buildings on both sides as it reaches Longlands Lock, again with a stone bridge over the tail. It passes under a disused railway bridge and the A62 road, and then close to Deighton railway station. The A62 bridge is a skew-arched bridge built for the opening of the canal, although the original structure is partially obscured by reinforced concrete extensions, which carry footpaths on both sides of the road. On the south bank is a large playing field, where the Inland Waterways Association held their National Festival in 2002. Turnpike Road Lock is situated at the southern end of the fields, and has a separate overflow channel to the north. Reading Lock has another stone bridge crossing its tail, and is followed by Fieldhouse Lock and bridge, which carries Fieldhouse Lane over the lock tail. Next comes Falls Lock, and finally Red Doles Lock and bridge. The lock is 2.3 miles (3.7 km) from the start of the canal, and the remaining mile (1.6 km) is level.

The canal is increasingly hemmed in by buildings. On the east bank is Phoenix Mill, a five-storey building with attics and a pitched slate roof. Close to the North Eastern Gas Board offices, which are located in a three-storey mid-19th century listed building, the canal makes a dog-leg turn under Leeds Road. On the west bank is an octagonal chimney, standing over 100 feet (30 m) tall, which was built in 1872 and formed part of a cotton spinning mill. Adjacent to it, the Locomotive lift bridge, which was installed in 1865, is a vertical lifting bridge. It was refurbished in 2002, and converted to electric operation. On the west bank is a seven-storey mill building originally belonging to John L Brierley. As the canal approaches Aspley Basin, there is a canal warehouse on the west bank, which dates from the construction of the canal, and another, which is Grade II* listed just after Wakefield Road bridge. The basin itself is at right angles to the canal.

== Points of interest ==
Point	Coordinates (Links to map resources)	OS Grid Ref	Notes
Cooper Bridge Lock	53.6814°N 1.7350°W	SE176205	Jn with Calder and Hebble
Colne Bridge Lock	53.6789°N 1.7337°W	SE176203	No 2
Ladgrave Lock	53.6732°N 1.7421°W	SE171196	No 3
Longlands Lock	53.6696°N 1.7444°W	SE169192	No 4
Turnpike Lock	53.6670°N 1.7559°W	SE162189	No 5
Reading Lock	53.6657°N 1.7599°W	SE159188	No 6
Fieldhouse Green Lock	53.6636°N 1.7639°W	SE156185	No 7
Falls Lock	53.6630°N 1.7656°W	SE155185	No 8
Red Doles Lock	53.6611°N 1.7708°W	SE152183	No 9
Turnbridge Loco Lift Bridge	53.6478°N 1.7753°W	SE149168	
Apsley Basin	53.6448°N 1.7748°W	SE149164	Effective end of broad canal

== See also ==
- Canals of the United Kingdom
- History of the British canal system

== Bibliography ==
- Cumberlidge, Jane (2009). Inland Waterways of Great Britain (8th ed.). Imray Laurie Norie and Wilson. ISBN 978-1-84623-010-3.
- Fairhurst, Richard (November 2011). "WW Guide to the Huddersfield Canals". Waterways World. ISSN 0309-1422.
- Hadfield, Charles (1972). The Canals of Yorkshire and North East England (Vol 1). David and Charles. ISBN 978-0-7153-5719-4.
- Hadfield, Charles (1973). The Canals of Yorkshire and North East England (Vol 2). David and Charles. ISBN 978-0-7153-5975-4.
- Hadfield, Charles; Biddle, Gordon (1970). The Canals of North West England, Vol 2 (pp.241–496). David and Charles. ISBN 978-0-7153-4992-2.
- Joy, David (1984). A Regional History of the Railways of Great Britain Volume VIII South and West Yorkshire. David St John Thomas. ISBN 978-0-946537-11-2.
- Nicholson (2006). Nicholson Guides Vol 6: Nottingham, York and the North East. Harper Collins Publishing. ISBN 0-00-721114-7.
- Priestley, Joseph (1831). "Historical Account of the Navigable Rivers, Canals and Railways of Great Britain".
- Shead, Jim (May 2005). "High & Dry". Waterways World. ISSN 0309-1422.
