= Aspley, Huddersfield =

Area of Huddersfield, West Yorkshire, England

Coordinates: 53.643°N 1.772°W

Aspley is an area adjacent to the ring road around Huddersfield, Kirklees, West Yorkshire, England. It comprises a mixture of independent shops, commercial units, a small retail park, houses, student accommodation and sections of the University of Huddersfield and Kirklees Council offices, pubs and fast food outlets. It is known locally as Aspley Wharf.

There is a small narrowboat marina adjacent to the Huddersfield Broad Canal and the Huddersfield Narrow Canal, known as Aspley Basin.

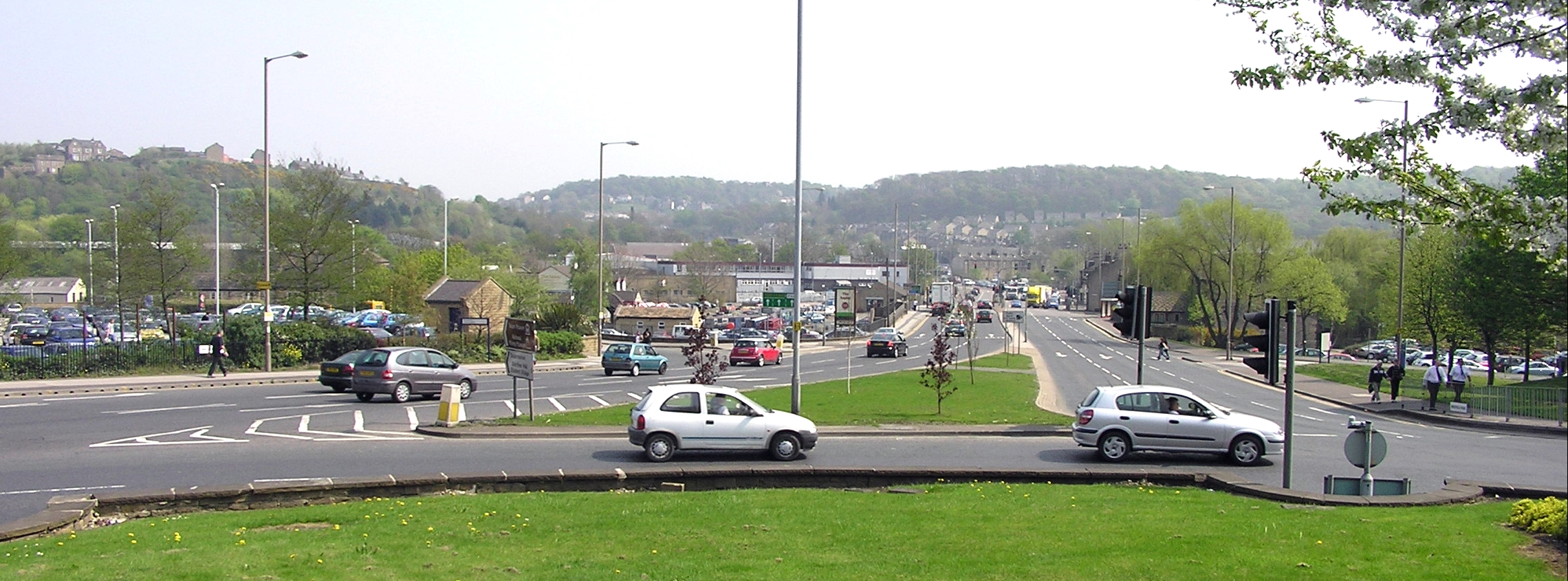
Wakefield Road, Aspley, Huddersfield

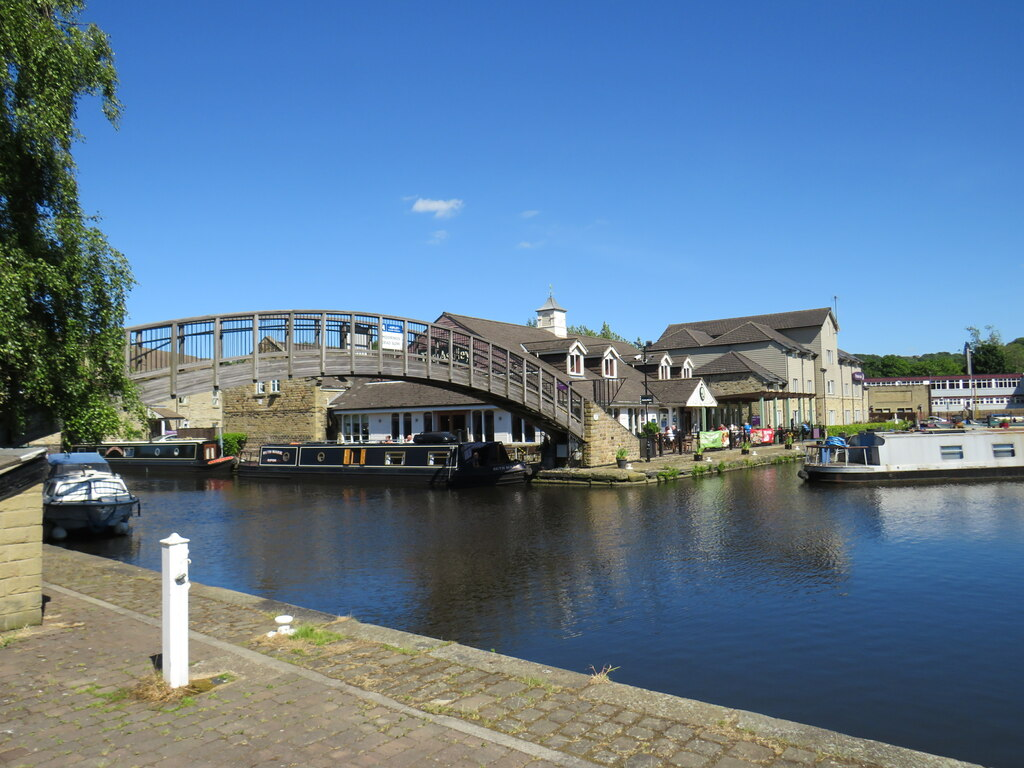
Aspley Basin

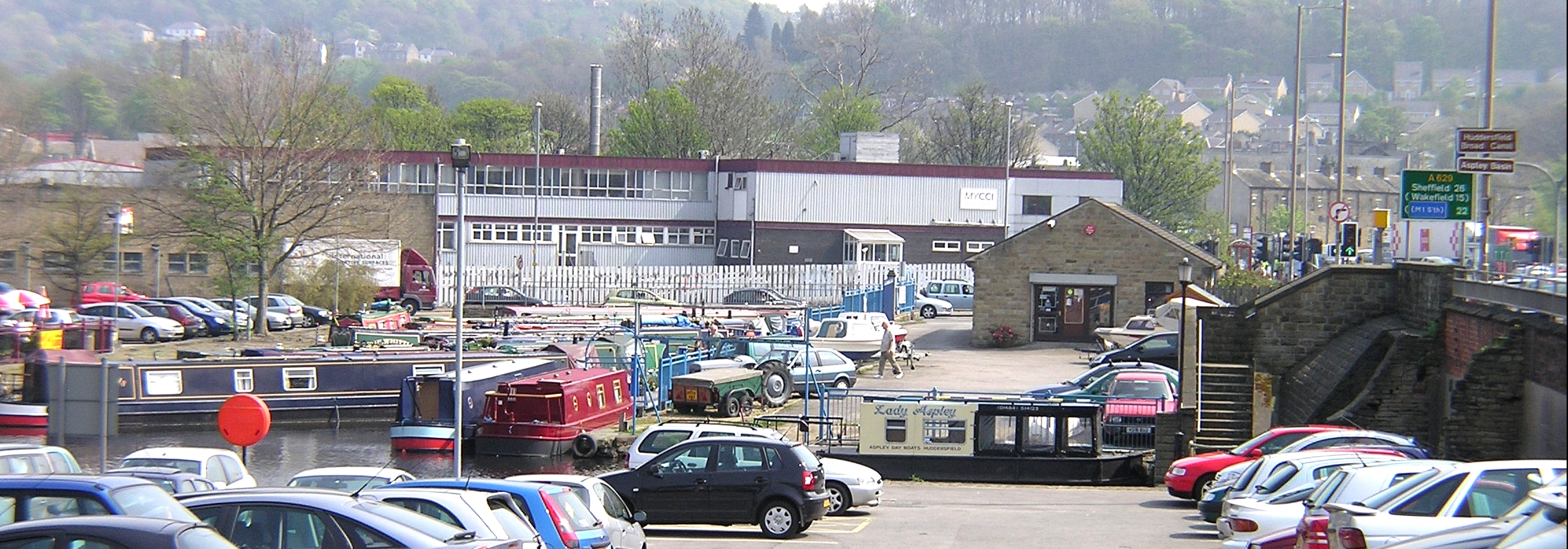
Aspley Marina

== Shopping and entertainment ==
There is a varied mixture of independent shops, pubs and fast food outlets alongside the main road through Aspley, from the Huddersfield ring road to Moldgreen and Waterloo, 2 miles (3.2 km) away. Smaller supermarkets exist within the retail park such as Asda (formerly a Netto), Lidl and Iceland located close to the junction of Somerset Road.

== See also ==
- Listed buildings in Huddersfield (Newsome Ward - outer areas)
