= Lists of mills =

This is a list of lists of mills.

- List of mills in Bradford
- List of mills in Bradford (metropolitan borough)
- List of mills in Calderdale
- List of mills in Chadderton
- List of mills in Clitheroe
- List of mills in Derbyshire
- List of mills in Dewsbury
- List of mills in Failsworth
- List of mills in Fall River, Massachusetts
- List of mills in Germany
- Greater Manchester
  - List of mills in Bury
  - List of mills in Bolton
  - List of mills in Manchester
  - List of mills in Oldham
  - List of mills in the Metropolitan Borough of Oldham
  - List of mills in Rochdale
  - List of mills in Salford
  - List of mills in Stockport
  - List of mills in Tameside
  - List of mills in Wigan
- List of mills in Holmfirth
- List of mills in Holyoke, Massachusetts
- List of mills in Huddersfield
- List of mills in Kirklees
- List of mills in Lancashire
- List of mills in Leeds
- List of mills in Longdendale and Glossopdale
- List of mills in New Bedford, Massachusetts
- List of mills in North Yorkshire
- List of mills in Preston
- List of mills in Royton
- List of mills in Saddleworth
- List of mills in Shaw and Crompton
- List of mills in South Yorkshire
- List of mills in Wakefield
- List of mills owned by the Lancashire Cotton Corporation Limited
