= List of mills in Royton =

This list of mills in Royton, lists textile factories that have existed in Royton, Greater Manchester, England.

== A–E ==
Name	Architect	Location	Built	Demolished	Served (Years)
Bee	Wild & Collins	Shaw Road SD 926 075 53°33′51″N 2°06′46″W	1901	Standing	63
	Notes: Spindleage - 1915: 102,216 Platts/ Engine - George Saxon 1500hp				
Beech		Chapel Street	<1838	1917	
	Notes: Spindleage - 1915: 55,000 Platts/Asa Lees.				
Belgian		Blackshaw Lane	c.1862	1955	
	Notes: Spindleage - 1915: 61,392 Platts/Asa lees. Engine - 1877 J. Musgrave & Sons 450hp				
Birchinlee		Off Middleton Road, SD 909 071 53°33′37″N 2°08′22″W	<1845		
Delta	Stotts & Sons	Crompton Street SD 918 073 53°33′43″N 2°07′27″W	1902	Standing	77
	Notes: Spindleage - 1954: 124,996 Mule, 9,120 Ring, Platts. Engine - J & E Wood 1500hp. The mill was extended in 1913. From 1950 to 1979 it was occupied by Cotton & Rayon Spinners Ltd. In 1981 three of the six floors were removed. In 1984 it became occupied by Money Controls Ltd who in 2009 submitted a planning application for its demolition and replacement with residential housing which was approved. In 2010 Money Controls were absorbed into Crane Payment Innovations who still occupy the mill.				
Dogford		Low Crompton Road	c.1795	1861-1871	
	Notes: Engine - Water power, 20hp steam				
Downey		Mill Street	<1838	<1939	
Elk	A. Turner & Son	Broadway SD 911 068 53°33′31″N 2°08′11″W	1927	1999	71
	Notes: 1927:107,240 Mule, Platts/Asa Lees. Engine - Parsons Steam Turbine, 2600hp. Elk Mill, on the Chadderton-Royton boundary, in Greater Manchester, England. The last mill to be built in Lancashire during the recession of 1926 and driven by a Parsons steam turbine that drove the mill by ropes and the neighbouring Shiloh Mills by electricity. It used cotton mules until 1974. Scrapped in 1983. Closed in 1998. Demolished in 1999. Part of Central Retail Park (also known as Elk Mill Retail Park) is built where it stood.				
Elly Clough		Holden Fold Lane	<1817	1930s	
	Notes: Engine - Water power, 10hp steam				

== F–J ==
Name	Architect	Location	Built	Demolished	Served (Years)
Fields / Lees Hall		Holden Fold Lane	<1817	c.1950	
	Notes: Engine - 7hp Steam Engine				
Fir	A.Turner	Highbarn Street SD 923 079 53°34′03″N 2°07′03″W	1906	2021	53
	Notes: Spindleage - 1915: 107,184 Platts. Engine - Scott & Hodgson 1600hp. Known since its closure as a cotton mill as Vernon Works				
Grape	T.W. Jenkins	Crompton Street SD 917 073 53°33′43″N 2°07′37″W	1906	Standing	57
	Notes: Spindleage - 1915: 126,324 Platts/ Engine - J. Musgrave & Sons horizontal cross compound of 1600 hp. Built by the Grape Mill Co Ltd.				
Gravel Hole		Springfield Lane 53°34′55″N 2°07′49″W	c.1870	>1959	
	Notes: Spindleage - 1954: 90 Looms.				
Hall Street / Top of the Fold		Fleet Street	1776-8	c.1900	
	Notes: Spindleage - 1889: 55,650 Mule.				
Holden Fold / Strange		Holden Fold Lane SD 914 068, 53°33′29″N 2°07′51″W	1832	Standing	159
	Notes: Spindleage - 1889: 10,000 346 Looms Platt/Asa Lees/ Engine - 12 hp				
Holly	Wild, Collins & Wild	Flake Lane	1890	1957	67
	Notes: Spindleage - 1890: 72,660 : 1905-142,664 Platts/ Engine - Pollit & Wigzell 1400hp				
Industry	E.Potts	Industry Street	1875	1930s	52
	Notes: Spindleage - 1887: 77,412/ Engine - Benjamin Goodfellow 850hp				

== K–O ==
Name	Architect	Location	Built	Demolished	Served (Years)
King	Wild, Collins & Wild	Crompton Street (now Shaw Road) 53°33′56″N 2°06′50″W	1897	1982	62
	Notes: Spindleage - 1915: 75,036 Mule, 277,504 Ring, Platts. Engine - G Saxon, 1500hp				
Lion	Wild, Collins & Wild	Fitton Street SD 927 076 53°33′54″N 2°06′40″W	1890	Standing	77
	1376630Notes: Spindleage - 1915: 109.680 Platts. Engine - Pollit & Wigzell, 2000hp. 5 storey, cast-iron and steel-framed, fireproof brick-arched construction with brick cladding. 23x10 bays with narrow stilted arched windows. Main sprinkler and stair tower projects from NE elevation. The Italianate detailed tower rises 2 storeys above the roof line.				
Luzley Brook / Albion		Crompton Street (now Shaw Road)	<1776	1891	
	Notes: Water mill				
Monarch	F.W. Dixon	Jones Street SD 919 068	1903	2005	69
	Notes: Spindleage - 1915: 132,744 Platts/Howard & Bullough/ Engine - George Saxon 1700hp				
Moss / Lamb / Rhos	1886 - Stotts & Sons	Higginshaw Lane 53°33′35″N 2°06′11″W	1862	1975	113
	Notes: Spindleage - 1915: 24,563 Mule 10,864 Ring/ Engine - 1898 Scott & Hodgson 600hp				
Norman	P.S. Stott	Boundary Street	1887	>1931	44
	Notes: Spindleage - 1915: 50,456/ Engine - 1889 Buckley & Taylor				

== P–T ==
Name	Architect	Location	Built	Demolished	Served (Years)
Park and Sandy No.1		Sandy Lane	c.1850/1875	1960s	
	Notes: Spindleage - 1889: 35,178 Platts/ Engine - 1881 - Timothy Bates & Co				
Park and Sandy No.2	A.Turner	Schofield Street SD 919 083 53°34′14″N 2°07′27″W	1913	2005	64
	Notes: Spindleage - 1915: 100,000 Asa Lees. Engine - Yates & Thorn 1600hp				
Park Lane / Vinegar		Park Lane	c.1844		
Park No.1 / Highfield	E.Potts	Bleasdale Street SD 919 081 53°34′12″N 2°07′23″W	1876	1989	86
	Notes: Spindleage - 1915: 250,000 Platts/Asa Lees. Engine - J Musgrave & Sons 2200hp				
Park No.2	A.Turner	Bleasdale Street SD 921 082 53°34′13″N 2°07′18″W	1912	2004	92
	Notes: Spindleage - 1915: 100,000. Engine - Yates & Thorn 1600hp. During demolition, the mill's chimney was felled by Bolton steeplejack Fred Dibnah, his last before his death.				
Parkside no.1		Edge Lane Street 53°33′56″N 2°07′02″W	1872	1930s	56
	Notes: Spindleage - 1889: 48,762 Platts . 1915: 143,232 Platts Asa/Lees. Engine - 1876: George Saxon 1750hp				
Parkside No. 2	Stotts & Sons	Edge Lane Street 53°33′56″N 2°07′02″W	1891	1983	90
	Notes: Spindleage - 1915: 143,232 Platts Asa/lees. Engine - 1915: Pollit & Wigzell, 1250hp / 1891 Timoth Bates & Co				
Roy	P.S. Stott	Rochdale Road 53°34′30″N 2°07′41″W	1906	1984	75
	Notes: Spindleage - 1915: 140,000 Platts/ Engine - 1915: Buckley & Taylor 1800hp				
Royton		Mill Lane	<1891	c.1900	
Royton Lane / Lane End		Royton Lane (Now Middleton Road) SD 916 074 53°33′46″N 2°07′41″W	<1817	Standing	
	Notes: Spindleage - 1923: 120 Looms/ Engine - 1832: 20 hp steam engine. Replaced with a Blackstone Oil Engine. Mill also known as Haggate, Holden's, Wheatfield and currently Charlton House				
Royton Ring	P.S. Stott	Industry Street (Now St. Phillips Drive) 53°33′17″N 2°07′09″W	1908	1992	58
	Notes: Spindleage - 1915: 64,176 Ring, 6,400 Doubling/ Engine - 1915: Urmson & Thompson 1700hp				
Royton Spinning No.1	J. Wild	High Barn Street	1872	1961	86
	Notes: Spindleage - 1915: 68,196 Platts/ Engine - 1872: Woolstenhumes & Rye. 1902: J. Musgrave & Sons				
Royton Spinning No.2	J. Mawson	High Barn Street	1883	1961	75
	Notes: Spindleage - 1915: 68,196 Platts/ Engine - J & W McNaught				
Sandy Lane		Sandy Lane	<1832		
Seville's		Sandy Lane		<1850	
	Notes: Replaced by Park and Sandy No. 1 Mill				
Shiloh		Holden Fold Lane 53°33′35″N 2°08′10″W	1789	1870	81
	Notes: Burnt down.				
Shiloh No.1	J. Wild	Holden Fold Lane 53°33′35″N 2°08′10″W	1876	1957	77
	Notes: Spindleage - 26,460 Patts/Asa Lees. Engine - George Saxon				
Shiloh No.1A		Holden Fold Lane 53°33′35″N 2°08′10″W	1888	1957	65
	Notes: Spindleage - 9144 Patts/Asa Lees.				
Shiloh No.2	Wild, Collins & Wild	Holden Fold Lane 53°33′35″N 2°08′10″W	1899-1901	1976	
	Notes: Spindleage - 74,748 Patts/Asa Lees. Engine - Wood Brothers				
Spaw / Spa / Owler	1866 Extn: J. Wild	Mill Lane	<1838	>1959	
	Notes: Engine - 1908: Pollit & Wigzell				
Springfield		Moss Lane 53°33′40″N 2°06′08″W	1869	1962	85
	Notes: Spindleage - 1915: 74,000 Mule, Platts/Asa Lees. Engine - 1901: J Musgrave & Sons 1000hp. Burnt down.				
Springhill		Middleton Road	c.1830	1930	
	Notes: Spindleage - 1889: 40,000 527 Looms.				
Star	J.Wild	Edge Lane Street 53°33′57″N 2°06′59″W	1874	1929	55
	Notes: Spindleage - 1915 106,632 Platts. Engine - 1885: George Saxon, 700hp 1915: George Saxon, 750hp				
Thornham No.1	J. Wild	Oozewood Road SD 914 086	1874	1962	88
	Notes: Spindleage - 1915: 85,560 Mule, Platts/Asa Lees. Engine - J. & W. McNaught 618hp				
Thornham No.2	J. Mawson	Oozewood Road 53°34′25″N 2°07′49″W	1885	Standing	141
	Notes: Spindleage - 1915: 85,560 Mule, Platts/Asa Lees. Engine - Woolstenhulmes & Rye 500hp				
Thorp		Thorp Clough 53°33′58″N 2°08′09″W	1764	>1792	24
Travis		Holden Fold Lane 53°33′35″N 2°08′10″W	<1838	1897	
	Notes: Spindleage - 1889:140 Looms. Replaced with Shiloh No.2 Mill				
Turf Lane		Turf Lane 53°33′45″N 2°06′28″W	1874	1960s	56
	Notes: Spindleage - 1915: 115,888 mule, 14,348 Ring, Platts. Engine - 1884: Buckley & Taylor, 1898: J. & E. Wood 900hp				

== U–Z ==
Name	Architect	Location	Built	Demolished	Served (Years)
Union		Union Street	<1827	>1896	
	Notes: Spindleage - 1889: 24,000 and 600 Looms.				
Vine	Wild, Collins & Wild	Middleton Road 53°33′46″N 2°07′39″W	1897	Standing	129
	Notes: Built Royton Textile Corporation Ltd. Spindleage - 1915: 97,680, Platts. Engine - George Saxon, 1800hp.				
Woodstock New Mill	Wild & Collins	Meek Street	1884		50
	Notes: Spindleage - 1915: 93,804 Platts/Asa Lees. Engine - J. Musgrave & Sons 200hp				
Woodstock Old Mill		Meek Street	1873	1939	61
