= List of mills in Failsworth =

This list of mills in Failsworth, lists textile factories that have existed in Failsworth, Greater Manchester, England.

Name	Architect	Location	Built	Demolished	Served (Years)
Albert		Albert Street SD 906 022 53°31′00″N 2°08′35″W	c.1850	Standing	
	Notes: It was built by the Executors of Joseph Lees. Extended in 1891 and again in 1903 and 1914. In 1915 the Spindleage was reported as 104,000. The original section of the mill burnt down on 8 March 1953. Was used for some time to produce fireworks until 1997. It would become Hollinwood Business Centre				
Albion Street / Clarke's		Albion Street 53°30′25″N 2°09′43″W	c.1860		
	Notes: Spindleage in 1889: 280 looms.				
Argyll	F.W. Dixon & Son	Holt Lane 53°30′25″N 2°08′46″W	1907	1983	55
	Notes: Built by Argyll Mill Ltd. Extended in 1908, 1914 and 1955. Its spindleage in 1915 was 117,000 Platts. The engine was a 1600hp George Saxon. Converted to an umbrella works in 1962 and renamed Lawtex House.				
Bank		Ashton Road West 53°30′31″N 2°09′30″W	1893	c.1955	41
	Notes: Spindleage - 1915: 61,100. Built by James Johnson.				
Chatsworth		Albert Street SD 906 022 53°30′56″N 2°08′33″W	c.1861	1972	
	Notes: Was originally part of the adjacent Albert Mill. It burnt down in 1972 by which point it was known as Chatsworth Mill.				
Cutler Hill / Hargreaves		Ashton Road East 53°30′30″N 2°08′22″W	1887	1930s	
	Notes: Built by John Hargreaves. The spindleage in 1915 was 90 looms. Made Turkish towels. Extended in 1891, 1893 and 1911. A further extension was planned but never occurred and the mill closed and became a chemical works.				
Dob Lane End		Morton Street 53°30′18″N 2°10′32″W		Standing	
	Notes: Built around 1860 by William Crossley. For around 30 years the Crossley family ran it. It's spindleage in 1889 was registered as 370 looms. In 1908 it was bought by Dob Lane Manufacturing Co. who renamed it Dob Lane Mill Co. In 1937 it was briefly occupied by Ashworth Hadwen & Co. It's currently a sheet metal works.				
Dob Meadow		Hobson Street, 53°30′15″N 2°10′26″W	<1868	1916	
Failsworth		Ashton Road West SD 895 013 53°30′28″N 2°09′36″W	1897	2014	62
	Notes: Spindleage - 1915: 66,000 mule, Asa Lees. Demolished in 2014 to make way for housing.				
Firs		Oldham Road SD 896 015 53°30′37″N 2°09′25″W	1839	1974	102
	Notes: Engine - 1875: John Mills, 200 hp. 1902: George Saxon, 1600hp. Spindleage - 1915: 92,716 mule, 4,800 ring, Platts.				
German / Louvain		Louvain Street 53°30′25″N 2°09′55″W	<1854	<1939	
	Notes: The spindleage in 1889 was 32,460. The mill was built by Nathan Pintus & Hardy. In 1875 it was occupied by Stanley Jackson & Son and in 1887 it was taken over by the German Mill Co. The mill and the company were renamed during the First World War to Louvain and Louvian Mill Ltd respectfully. Following the war its new owners were Ritchie & Eason. Extensions were made in 1919-1920 before the mill changed hands again too Failsworth Spinning Co. Ltd. A fire damaged the mill on 27 February 1929 ceasing production. Its later uses included a wax company and even a boxing stadium before its demolition prior the Second World War.				
Hope		Ashton Road West 53°30′33″N 2°09′26″W	1874	1936	
	Notes: The spindleage in 1889 was 68,832 Asa, Lees/Platts. The engine at that time was an 800hp Buckley & Taylor but it was upgraded by 1908 to a 1200hp George Saxon. The mill was built by Hope Cotton Spinning Co. Extensions made in 1885, 1907 and 1919.				
Ivy	F.W. Dixon (1890 Extn)	Crown Street SD 897 017 53°30′43″N 2°09′26″W	1883	Standing	51
	Notes: It was built by George Schofield. At the time of construction a 430hp Timothy Bates and Co. engine was built for the mill which was replaced with a 650hp Pollit and Wigzell engine 7 years later. Extensions were constructed in 1890-1, 1893 and 1896. Many more extensions were built between 1905 and 1921. In 1915 the spindleage was 76,020 Asa Lees/Platts. It ceased cotton production in 1934 and was acquired by A. V. Roe & Co. to manufacture aircraft parts. For some time it was a mail order warehouse used by both JD Williams and Littlewoods before being split into offices and named Ivy Business Centre.				
Lime		Albert Street SD 907 024 53°31′04″N 2°08′32″W	1874	>1998	60
	Notes: In 1915 Lime had a 1150 hp Scott & Hodgson engine powering 55,080 Platts spindles. Cotton production ceased in 1934. Before its demolition it was occupied by Dannimac				
Marlborough No.1	P.S. Stott	Mellor Street SD 889 009 53°30′18″N 2°10′03″W	1905	Standing	50
	Notes: Built by Marlborough Mill Ltd. In 1915 the spindleage was 114,456, Asa Lees powered by a 1700hp George Saxon engine. Both Marlborough 1 and Marlborough 2 ceased cotton production in 1955.				
Marlborough No.2	P.S. Stott	Poplar Street SD 889 009 53°30′15″N 2°10′11″W	1908	2002	47
	Notes: Built by Marlborough Mill Ltd. In 1915 the spindleage was 114,456, Asa Lees powered by a 1700hp George Saxon engine. Both Marlborough 1 and Marlborough 2 ceased cotton production in 1955. After demolition the Morrisons store that replaced it was designed to mimic the style and appearance of the former mill, and included a white brick sign with the name Marlborough.				
Morton		Morton Street SD 884 010 53°30′18″N 2°10′33″W	1914	2020	45
	Notes: Built by E.S. Kearsley Ltd as a small doubling mill with extensions made in 1921. Its spindleage in 1915 was 21,000. Currently occupied by a number of small businesses. Destroyed by fire 29 March 2020				
New Road		Cheetham Street 53°30′49″N 2°09′01″W	<1838	1868	
	Notes: Rebuilt as Phoenix Mill				
Phoenix Mill		Cheetham Street 53°30′49″N 2°09′01″W	1868	Standing	
	Notes: Converted in the 1880s to India Rubber Works as it remained until 1989 before being split up into industrial units under the banner of Phoenix Industrial Estate. Planning applications for its demolition to make way for 89 houses were submitted in 2013.				
Regent	George Stott	Oldham Road SD 895 013 53°30′31″N 2°09′37″W	1906	Standing	119
	1376628Notes: This was built as a ring-spinning mill. A four storey 42X5 bay, rolled iron and steel beam, brick arch fire-proof construction, Supported on cast-iron columns. The mill was powered by an 1800 horse power Buckley and Taylor vertical stationary steam engine.				
Ridgefield	J. Wild	Ridgefield Street 53°30′20″N 2°10′00″W	1875	1935	60
	Notes: Built by Ridgefield Cotton Spinning Co. extended in 1881 and 1919-20. In 1915 the spindleadge was 73,872. The machinery was manufactured by Platts and Howard & Bollough. Its first engine was 750hp, made by Buckley & Taylor. In 1911 it had been replaced by 1300hp engine made by George Saxon. The 1919-20 extension survived the original demolition of the building and was used for some time as a workshop with a dairy built around it. Planning permission to clear all the land for housing was submitted in 2016.				
Union		Wrigley Head		1988	
	Notes: Small silk mill taken over by the Crossley brothers of Dob Lane End Mill (see above) around 1884.				
Windsor/Rose		Hollins Road (Canal Street) SD 905 024 53°31′05″N 2°08′39″W	1860	2016	
	Notes: Built by John Stott. Part of the building was occupied by Rose Spinning Co and called Rose Mill between 1872 and 1885. Extended in 1835 and 1940-41. From 1926 until recently it had been occupied by Alfred O. Ferguson & Co. later known as Fothergill Polycom Ltd. who rubber proofed garments but they have now moved to Victoria Mill, Chadderton.				
Wrigley Head		Wrigley Head Crescent SD 897 019 53°30′48″N 2°09′24″W	1882	1988	77
	Notes: Samuel Johnson & Co. built the mill. Its engine in 1889 was a Benjamin Goodfellow 300 hp, upgraded in 1897 to 350 hp. The mill was extended twice in 1888 and 1911. Its Spindleage in 1915 was 42,000 mule, 11,000 ring, with machinery manufactured by Platts and Asa Lees. It was occupied by a builders and plumbers merchants for some time after it ceased production of cotton.				
