= List of mills in Dewsbury =

This is a list of the wool, cotton and other textile mills in Dewsbury, Kirklees, West Yorkshire

== Dewsbury ==
Name	Architect	Location	Built	Demolished	Served (Years)
Albert Mills		Dewsbury, SE 2286 2297 53°42′10″N 1°39′19″W			
	Notes: National Building Register:63466: (B)				
Aldams Mill		Dewsbury, SE 2411 2149 53°41′21″N 1°38′11″W			
	Notes: National Building Register:63544: (C)				
Anchor Mill		Dewsbury,			
	Notes: (see Aldams Mill)				
Batley Carr Mills		Dewsbury, SE 2435 2265 53°41′59″N 1°37′58″W			
	Notes: National Building Register:63534: (A)				
Batley Carr Old Mill		Dewsbury, SE 2434 2253 53°41′55″N 1°37′58″W			
	Notes: National Building Register:63537: (B)				
Britannia Mill		Dewsbury, SE 2445 2145 53°41′20″N 1°37′52″W			
	Notes: National Building Register:63549: (A)				
Calder Bank Mills		Dewsbury, SE 239 211 53°41′09″N 1°38′23″W			
	Notes: National Building Register:495: (C)				
Calder Mills		Dewsbury, SE 2470 2132 53°41′16″N 1°37′39″W			
	Notes: National Building Register:63550: (C)				
Calder Steam Mill		Dewsbury, SE 2370 2071 53°40′56″N 1°38′34″W			
	Notes: National Building Register:63640: (B)				
Calder Works		Dewsbury,			
	Notes: (see Calder Steam Mill)				
Carlton Mill		Dewsbury, SE 2430 2232 53°41′48″N 1°38′00″W			
	Notes: National Building Register:63539: (B)				
Carr Mills		Dewsbury, SE 2449 2265 53°41′59″N 1°37′50″W			
	Notes: National Building Register:63536: (B)				
Cloth Hall Mills		Dewsbury, SE 2455 2205 53°41′39″N 1°37′47″W			
	Notes: National Building Register:63542: (B)				
Crown Mills		Dewsbury, SE 2295 2245 53°41′53″N 1°39′14″W			
	Notes: National Building Register:63468: (B)				
Dewsbury Mills		Dewsbury, SE 2405 2050 53°40′49″N 1°38′15″W			
	Notes: National Building Register:63556: (B)				
Dyeware Mills		Dewsbury,			
	Notes: (see Calder Steam Mill)				
Eastfield Mills		Dewsbury, SE 2502 2129 53°41′15″N 1°37′21″W			
	Notes: National Building Register:63568: (B)				
Ellis's Mill		Dewsbury,			
	Notes: (see Batley Carr Mills)				
Hirstland Mill		Dewsbury, SE 2426 2233 53°41′49″N 1°38′03″W			
	Notes: National Building Register:63538: (B)				
Kiln Mill		Dewsbury, SE 2400 2135 53°41′17″N 1°38′17″W			
	Notes: National Building Register:63545: (B)				
Low Mill		Dewsbury, SE 2265 2195 53°41′37″N 1°39′30″W			
	Notes: National Building Register:63469: (A)				
Moor End Mill		Dewsbury, SE 2274 2287 53°42′06″N 1°39′25″W			
	Notes: National Building Register:63467: (A)				
New Wakefield Mill		Dewsbury, SE 2475 2205 53°41′39″N 1°37′36″W			
	Notes: National Building Register:63543: (B)				
Old Mill		Dewsbury,			
	Notes: (see Batley Carr Old Mill)				
Providence Mill		Dewsbury, SE 2399 2120 53°41′12″N 1°38′18″W			
	Notes: National Building Register:63494: (B)				
Providence Mills		Dewsbury, SE 2447 2211 53°41′41″N 1°37′51″W			
	Notes: National Building Register:63641: (B)				
Rag Warehouse		Dewsbury, SE 2448 2262 53°41′58″N 1°37′51″W			
	Notes: National Building Register:63642: (B)				
Ratcliffe Mill		Dewsbury, SE 2393 2020 53°40′40″N 1°38′21″W			
	Notes: National Building Register:63500: (B)				
Ravenswharf Mills		Dewsbury, SE 2315 2057 53°40′52″N 1°39′04″W			
	Notes: National Building Register:63497: (B)				
Sands Mill		Dewsbury, SE 2539 2056 53°40′51″N 1°37′01″W			
	Notes: National Building Register:63570: (B)				
Scout Hill Mills		Dewsbury, SE 2350 2082 53°41′00″N 1°38′44″W			
	Notes: National Building Register:63660: (B)				
Shoddy Mill		Dewsbury, SE 2330 2062 53°40′53″N 1°38′55″W			
	Notes: National Building Register:63496: (B)				
Spinkwell Mills		Dewsbury, SE 243 220 53°41′38″N 1°38′00″W			
	Notes: National Building Register:541: (C)				
Victoria Works		Dewsbury,			
	Notes: (see Kiln Mill)				
West End Mills		Dewsbury, SE 2442 2181 53°41′32″N 1°37′54″W			
	Notes: National Building Register:63669: (C)				

== Soothill ==
Name	Architect	Location	Built	Demolished	Served (Years)
Alexandra Mills, Batley		Soothill, SE 2485 2355 53°42′28″N 1°37′30″W			
	Notes: National Building Register:63521: (B)				
Chickenley Mill(D)		Soothill, SE 2622 2118 53°41′11″N 1°36′16″W			
	Notes: National Building Register:63600: (B)				
Culvert Mills, Batley		Soothill, SE 2510 2451 53°42′59″N 1°37′16″W			
	Notes: National Building Register:63563: (B)				
Greengates Mill, Dewsbury		Soothill, SE 2683 2164 53°41′26″N 1°35′43″W			
	Notes: National Building Register:63598: (B)				
Greenhill Mills		Soothill,			
	Notes: (see Greenhill Dyeworks)				
Hoyle Head Mills, Dewsbury		Soothill, SE 2562 2129 53°41′15″N 1°36′49″W			
	Notes: National Building Register:63566: (B)				
jillinging Mil1s, Dewsbury		Soothill, SE 2610 2110 53°41′08″N 1°36′23″W			
	Notes: National Building Register:63601: (B)				
Lady Ann Mill, Batley		Soothill, SE 2505 2467 53°43′04″N 1°37′19″W			
	Notes: National Building Register:63562: (B)				
Little Royd Mill, Dewsbury		Soothill, SE 2534 2110 53°41′09″N 1°37′04″W			
	Notes: National Building Register:63567: (B)				
Mill, Batley		Soothill, SE 2485 2370 53°42′33″N 1°37′30″W			
	Notes: National Building Register:63644: (B)				
Mill(B)		Soothill, SE 2490 2387 53°42′38″N 1°37′27″W			
	Notes: National Building Register:63649: (B)				
Phoenix Mill, Batley		Soothill, SE 2478 2400 53°42′43″N 1°37′34″W			
	Notes: National Building Register:63514: (A)				
Providence Mill, Dewsbury		Soothill, SE 2583 2137 53°41′17″N 1°36′37″W			
	Notes: National Building Register:63565: (B)				
Savile Mill, Batley		Soothill, SE 2484 2350 53°42′26″N 1°37′31″W			
	Notes: National Building Register:63522: (B)				
Scar End Mi11(D)		Soothill, SE 2553 2029 53°40′42″N 1°36′54″W			
	Notes: National Building Register:63571: (B)				
Station Road, 16–18, Batley		Soothill, SE 248 238 53°42′36″N 1°37′33″W			
	Notes: National Building Register:709: (C)				
Station Road, 20–22, Batley		Soothill, SE 248 238 53°42′36″N 1°37′33″W			
	Notes: National Building Register:710: (C)				
Station Road, 24–26, Batley		Soothill, SE 248 238 53°42′36″N 1°37′33″W			
	Notes: National Building Register:711: (C)				
Station Road, 25, Batley		Soothill, SE 2482 2392 53°42′40″N 1°37′32″W			
	Notes: National Building Register:63717: (B)				
Station Road, 31–33, Batley		Soothill, SE 2485 2389 53°42′39″N 1°37′30″W			
	Notes: National Building Register:63716: (B)				
Station Road, 32–40, Batley		Soothill, SE 2489 2378 53°42′35″N 1°37′28″W			
	Notes: National Building Register:63712: (B)				
Station Road, 35–37, Batley		Soothill, SE 248 238 53°42′36″N 1°37′33″W			
	Notes: National Building Register:715: (C)				
Station Road, 39, Batley		Soothill, SE 248 238 53°42′36″N 1°37′33″W			
	Notes: National Building Register:714: (C)				
Station Road, 47–51, Batley		Soothill, SE 2491 2381 53°42′36″N 1°37′27″W			
	Notes: National Building Register:63713: (B)				
Sykelng Mill, Dewsbury		Soothill, SE 2615 2135 53°41′17″N 1°36′20″W			
	Notes: National Building Register:63599: (A)				
Sykeing Mills(D)		Soothill, SE 2598 2140 53°41′18″N 1°36′29″W			
	Notes: National Building Register:63564: (B)				
Union Mill, Batley		Soothill, SE 2490 2348 53°42′26″N 1°37′27″W			
	Notes: National Building Register:63523: (B)				
Warehouse, Dewsbury		Soothill, SE 2555 2121 53°41′12″N 1°36′53″W			
	Notes: National Building Register:63637: (B)				

== Thornhill (Dewsbury) ==
Name	Architect	Location	Built	Demolished	Served (Years)
Albert Mills		Thornhill (Dewsbury), SE 2435 2135 53°41′17″N 1°37′58″W			
	Notes: National Building Register:63546: (B)				
Bridge Mill		Thornhill (Dewsbury), SE 2441 2135 53°41′17″N 1°37′55″W			
	Notes: National Building Register:63547: (B)				
Cut End Mills		Thornhill (Dewsbury), SE 2479 2122 53°41′13″N 1°37′34″W			
	Notes: National Building Register:63551: (B)				
Headfield Mills		Thornhill (Dewsbury), SE 241 206 53°40′53″N 1°38′12″W			
	Notes: National Building Register:555: (C)				
Hebble Mill		Thornhill (Dewsbury), SE 2465 1969 53°40′23″N 1°37′42″W			
	Notes: National Building Register:63741: (B)				
King’s Mill		Thornhill (Dewsbury), SE 2503 2109 53°41′08″N 1°37′21″W			
	Notes: National Building Register:63569: (B)				
Midland Mills		Thornhill (Dewsbury), SE 2428 2138 53°41′18″N 1°38′02″W			
	Notes: National Building Register:63639: (B)				
Mill		Thornhill (Dewsbury), SE 2495 2102 53°41′06″N 1°37′25″W			
	Notes: National Building Register:63638: (B)				
Queen's Mill		Thornhill (Dewsbury), SE 2489 2115 53°41′10″N 1°37′29″W			
	Notes: National Building Register:63552: (B)				
Savile Mills		Thornhill (Dewsbury), SE 2460 2115 53°41′10″N 1°37′44″W			
	Notes: National Building Register:63553: (B)				
Slaithwaite Mill		Thornhill (Dewsbury),			
	Notes: (see Hebble Mill)				
Thornton’s Ragwarehouse		Thornhill (Dewsbury), SE 2449 2126 53°41′14″N 1°37′50″W			
	Notes: National Building Register:63548: (B)				
Victoria Mills		Thornhill (Dewsbury), SE 2478 2111 53°41′09″N 1°37′35″W			
	Notes: National Building Register:63554: (B)				

== Warehouses ==
Name	Architect	Location	Built	Demolished	Served (Years)
Warehouse, 23 Bond Street		Dewsbury, SE 244 217 53°41′28″N 1°37′55″W			
	Notes: National Building Register:718: (C)				
Warehouse, 23 Bradford Road		Dewsbury, SE 2442 2218 53°41′44″N 1°37′54″W			
	Notes: National Building Register:63672: (B)				
Warehouse, 25 Bradford Road		Dewsbury, SE 244 221 53°41′41″N 1°37′55″W			
	Notes: National Building Register:673: (C)				
Warehouse, 27 Bradford Road		Dewsbury, SE 2442 2220 53°41′44″N 1°37′54″W			
	Notes: National Building Register:63674: (B)				
Warehouse, 29 Bradford Road		Dewsbury, SE 244 222 53°41′44″N 1°37′55″W			
	Notes: National Building Register:675: (C)				
Warehouse, 39–11 Bradford Road		Dewsbury, SE 244 223 53°41′48″N 1°37′55″W			
	Notes: National Building Register:676: (C)				
Warehouse, 40 Bradford Road		Dewsbury, SE 244 221 53°41′41″N 1°37′55″W			
	Notes: National Building Register:704: (C)				
Warehouse, 42 Bradford Road		Dewsbury, SE 244 221 53°41′41″N 1°37′55″W			
	Notes: National Building Register:703: (C)				
Warehouse, 44416 Bradford Road		Dewsbury, SE 244 221 53°41′41″N 1°37′55″W			
	Notes: National Building Register:702: (C)				
Warehouse, 52 Bradford Road		Dewsbury, SE 2447 2220 53°41′44″N 1°37′51″W			
	Notes: National Building Register:63701: (B)				
Warehouse, 55–57 Bradford Road		Dewsbury, SE 2441 2231 53°41′48″N 1°37′54″W			
	Notes: National Building Register:63677: (B)				
Warehouse, 62–64 Bradford Road		Dewsbury, SE 244 222 53°41′44″N 1°37′55″W			
	Notes: National Building Register:699: (C)				
Warehouse, behind 64 Bradford Road		Dewsbury, SE 244 222 53°41′44″N 1°37′55″W			
	Notes: National Building Register:700: (C)				
Warehouse, 86 Bradford Road		Dewsbury, SE 244 223 53°41′48″N 1°37′55″W			
	Notes: National Building Register:697: (C)				
Warehouse, 88–90 Bradford Road		Dewsbury, SE 2444 2235 53°41′49″N 1°37′53″W			
	Notes: National Building Register:63694: (B)				
Warehouse, 89 Bradford Road		Dewsbury, SE 244 224 53°41′51″N 1°37′55″W			
	Notes: National Building Register:679: (C)				
Warehouse, 100 Bradford Road		Dewsbury, SE 2445 2239 53°41′50″N 1°37′52″W			
	Notes: National Building Register:63693: (B)				
Warehouse, 102 Bradford Road		Dewsbury, SE 244 224 53°41′51″N 1°37′55″W			
	Notes: National Building Register:691: (C)				
Warehouse, 103 Bradford Road		Dewsbury, SE 243 225 53°41′54″N 1°38′00″W			
	Notes: National Building Register:680: (C)				
Warehouse, 130 Bradford Road		Dewsbury, SE 244 224 53°41′51″N 1°37′55″W			
	Notes: National Building Register:689: (C)				
Warehouse, 138 Bradford Road		Dewsbury, SE 2445 2250 53°41′54″N 1°37′52″W			
	Notes: National Building Register:63688: (B)				
Warehouse, 146–150 Bradford Road		Dewsbury, SE 224 226 53°41′58″N 1°39′44″W			
	Notes: National Building Register:687: (C)				
Warehouse, 152 Bradford Road		Dewsbury, SE 224 226 53°41′58″N 1°39′44″W			
	Notes: National Building Register:686: (C)				
Warehouse, 166 Bradford Road		Dewsbury, SE 244 226 53°41′57″N 1°37′55″W			
	Notes: National Building Register:685: (C)				
Warehouse, Carlton Road		Dewsbury, SE 243 223 53°41′48″N 1°38′00″W			
	Notes: National Building Register:678: (C)				
Warehouse, Lower Peel Street		Dewsbury, SE 2449 2230 53°41′48″N 1°37′50″W			
	Notes: National Building Register:63698: (B)				
Warehouse, North Street		Dewsbury, SE 244 224 53°41′51″N 1°37′55″W			
	Notes: National Building Register:690: (C)				
Warehouse, 5 Upper South Street		Dewsbury, SE 2448 2337 53°42′22″N 1°37′50″W			
	Notes: National Building Register:63696: (B)				
Warehouse, 12 Upper South Street		Dewsbury, SE 2447 2235 53°41′49″N 1°37′51″W			
	Notes: National Building Register:63695: (B)				
Warehouse, Ward Street		Dewsbury, SE 244 224 53°41′51″N 1°37′55″W			
	Notes: National Building Register:692: (C)				
Warehouse, 3 Wel1ington Road		Dewsbury, SE 244 218 53°41′31″N 1°37′55″W			
	Notes: National Building Register:720: (C)				
Warehouse, 7 Wellington Road		Dewsbury, SE 244 218 53°41′31″N 1°37′55″W			
	Notes: National Building Register:721: (C)				
Warehouse, 9 Wellington Road		Dewsbury, SE 244 218 53°41′31″N 1°37′55″W			
	Notes: National Building Register:722: (C)				
Warehouse, 15 Wellington Road		Dewsbury, SE 2440 2178 53°41′31″N 1°37′55″W			
	Notes: National Building Register:63723 : (B)				
Warehouse, 23-25 Wellington Road		Dewsbury, SE 243 216 53°41′25″N 1°38′01″W			
	Notes: National Building Register:705: (C)				
Warehouse, 26 Wellington Road		Dewsbury, SE 243 216 53°41′25″N 1°38′01″W			
	Notes: National Building Register:724: (C)				
Warehouse, 28 Wellington Road		Dewsbury, SE 243 216 53°41′25″N 1°38′01″W			
	Notes: National Building Register:725: (C)				
Warehouse, 13 Wellington Street		Dewsbury, SE 2397 2129 53°41′15″N 1°38′19″W			
	Notes: National Building Register:663719: (C)				

== See also ==
- Heavy Woollen District
- Textile processing
