= List of mills in Leeds =

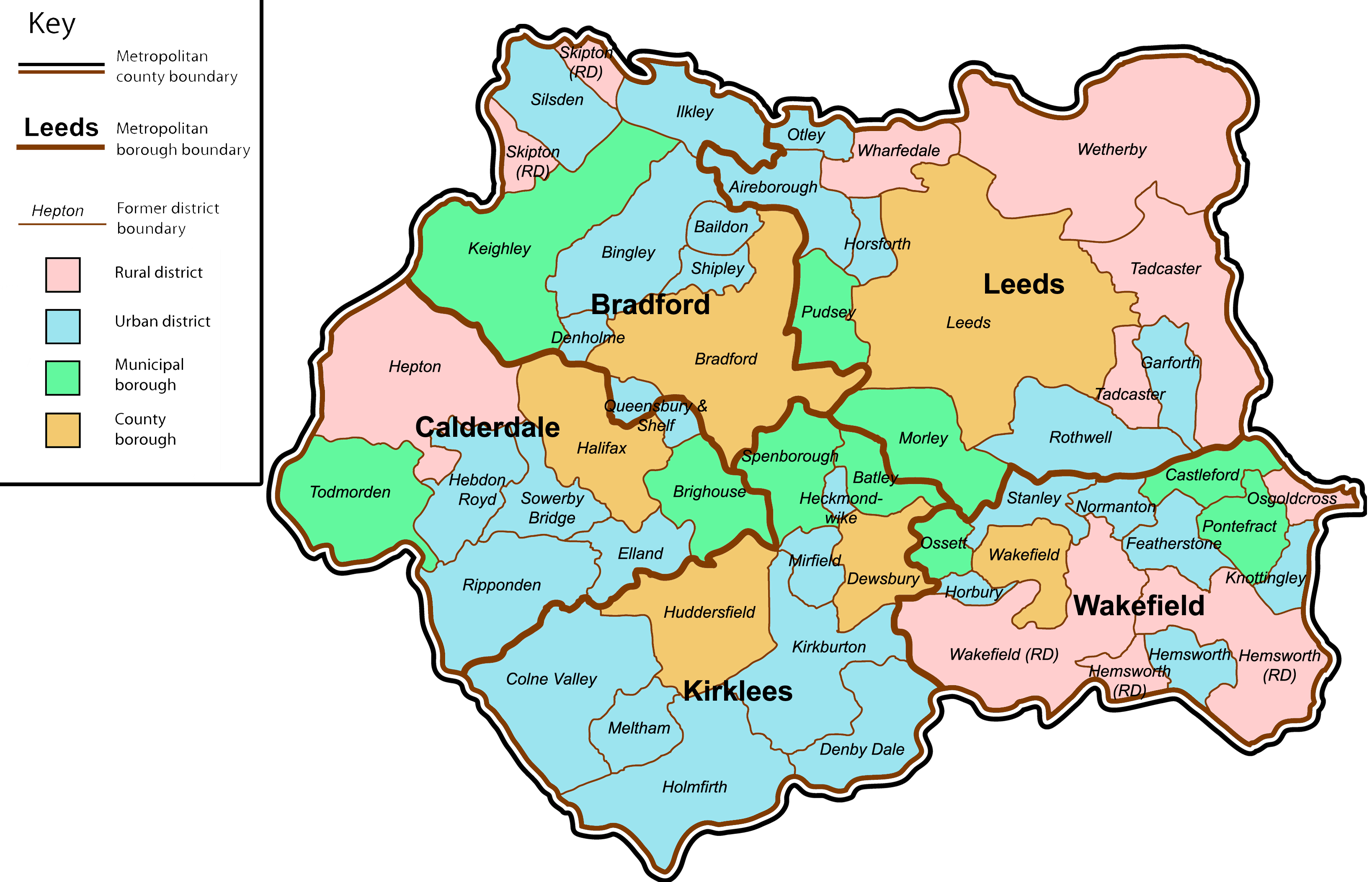
Leeds, in West Yorkshire, England

This is a list of the wool, cotton and other textile mills in Leeds, West Yorkshire.

== Adel Cum Eccup (Leeds) ==
| Name | Architect | Location | Built | Demolished | Served (Years) |
|---|---|---|---|---|---|
| Scotland Mill | | Adel Cum Eccup (Leeds), SE 2849 3875 53°50′39″N 1°34′07″W | | | |
| | Notes: National Building Register:63421: (C) | | | | |

== Esholt (Aireborough) ==
| Name | Architect | Location | Built | Demolished | Served (Years) |
|---|---|---|---|---|---|
| Esholt Mill | | Esholt (Aireborough), SE 1721 3989 53°51′18″N 1°44′23″W | | | |
| | Notes: National Building Register:62541: (B) | | | | |

== Hawksworth (Aireborough) ==
| Name | Architect | Location | Built | Demolished | Served (Years) |
|---|---|---|---|---|---|
| Tong Park Mills | | Hawksworth (Aireborough), SE 1695 4015 53°51′26″N 1°44′38″W | | | |
| | Notes: National Building Register:62311: (B) | | | | |

== Armley (Leeds) ==
| Name | Architect | Location | Built | Demolished | Served (Years) |
|---|---|---|---|---|---|
| Antwerp Mill | | Armley (Leeds), SE 2650 3331 53°47′43″N 1°35′57″W | | | |
| | Notes: National Building Register:63313: (B) | | | | |
| Armley Mills | | Armley (Leeds), SE 2758 3417 53°48′11″N 1°34′58″W | | | |
| | Notes: National Building Register:63320: (B) | | | | |
| Bankfield Mills | | Armley (Leeds), SE 2755 3380 53°47′59″N 1°35′00″W | | | |
| | Notes: National Building Register:63323: (B) | | | | |
| Tong Road Mills | | Armley (Leeds), SE 2730 3305 53°47′35″N 1°35′13″W | | | |
| | Notes: National Building Register:63325: (C) | | | | |
| Winker Green Mill | | Armley (Leeds), SE 2700 3369 53°47′56″N 1°35′30″W | | | |
| | Notes: National Building Register:63324: (A) | | | | |

== Beeston (Leeds) ==
| Name | Architect | Location | Built | Demolished | Served (Years) |
|---|---|---|---|---|---|
| Grove Hall Mills | | Beeston (Leeds), SE 2900 2995 53°45′54″N 1°33′42″W | | | |
| | Notes: National Building Register:63622: (B) | | | | |

== Bramley (Leeds) ==
| Name | Architect | Location | Built | Demolished | Served (Years) |
|---|---|---|---|---|---|
| Aire Vale Dyeworks | | Bramley (Leeds), SE 239 367 53°49′34″N 1°38′18″W | | | |
| | Notes: National Building Register:63281: (B) | | | | |
| Airedale Mills | | Bramley (Leeds), SE 2290 3610 53°49′14″N 1°39′13″W | | | |
| | Notes: National Building Register:63262: (B) | | | | |
| Allen Brigg Mill | | Bramley (Leeds), SE 2283 3362 53°47′54″N 1°39′18″W | | | |
| | Notes: National Building Register:63270: (B) | | | | |
| Arrowvale Mill | | Bramley (Leeds), | | | |
| | Notes: (see Aire Vale Dyeworks) | | | | |
| Bath Lane Mill | | Bramley (Leeds), SE 2429 3453 53°48′23″N 1°37′58″W | | | |
| | Notes: National Building Register:63300: (B) | | | | |
| Bramley Mill | | Bramley (Leeds), SE 2315 3485 53°48′34″N 1°39′00″W | | | |
| | Notes: National Building Register:63285: (B) | | | | |
| Britannia Mill | | Bramley (Leeds), SE 2342 3421 53°48′13″N 1°38′45″W | | | |
| | Notes: National Building Register:63288: (C) | | | | |
| Broad Lane Mill | | Bramley (Leeds), | | | |
| | Notes: (see Bramley Mill) | | | | |
| Cape Mills | | Bramley (Leeds), SE 2242 3535 53°48′50″N 1°39′40″W | | | |
| | Notes: National Building Register:63266: (A) | | | | |
| Catherine Mills | | Bramley (Leeds), SE 2488 3570 53°49′01″N 1°37′25″W | | | |
| | Notes: National Building Register:63297: (B) | | | | |
| Craven Mills | | Bramley (Leeds), SE 2474 3449 53°48′22″N 1°37′33″W | | | |
| | Notes: National Building Register:63302: (B) | | | | |
| Elmfield Mill | | Bramley (Leeds), SE 2485 3435 53°48′17″N 1°37′27″W | | | |
| | Notes: National Building Register:63304: (B) | | | | |
| Empire Mills | | Bramley (Leeds), SE 2335 3515 53°48′44″N 1°38′49″W | | | |
| | Notes: National Building Register:63283: (C) | | | | |
| Hough End Mills | | Bramley (Leeds), SE 244 336 53°47′53″N 1°37′52″W | | | |
| | Notes: National Building Register:63393: (B) | | | | |
| Low Mill | | Bramley (Leeds), SE 2215 3449 53°48′22″N 1°39′55″W | | | |
| | Notes: National Building Register:63267: (B) | | | | |
| Mill | | Bramley (Leeds), SE 2486 3349 53°47′50″N 1°37′27″W | | | |
| | Notes: National Building Register:63388: (B) | | | | |
| Moss Bridge Works | | Bramley (Leeds), | | | |
| | Notes: (see Airedale Mills) | | | | |
| Prospect Works | | Bramley (Leeds), SE 2314 3493 53°48′36″N 1°39′00″W | | | |
| | Notes: National Building Register:63284: (B) | | | | |
| Ross Mills | | Bramley (Leeds), SE 2365 3589 53°49′07″N 1°38′32″W | | | |
| | Notes: National Building Register:63282: (B) | | | | |
| St Catherine’s Mill | | Bramley (Leeds), | | | |
| | Notes: (see Catherine Mills) | | | | |
| Spring Valley Mills | | Bramley (Leeds), | | | |
| | Notes: (see Low Mill) | | | | |
| Springfield Mill | | Bramley (Leeds), SE 2482 3449 53°48′22″N 1°37′29″W | | | |
| | Notes: National Building Register:63303: (A) | | | | |
| Swinnow Grange Mill | | Bramley (Leeds), SE 2322 3461 53°48′26″N 1°38′56″W | | | |
| | Notes: National Building Register:63287: (B) | | | | |
| Swinnow Lane Mill | | Bramley (Leeds), | | | |
| | Notes: (see Bramley Mill) | | | | |
| Town End Mills | | Bramley (Leeds), SE 2512 3441 53°48′19″N 1°37′12″W | | | |
| | Notes: National Building Register:63306: (B) | | | | |
| Victoria Mill | | Bramley (Leeds), SE 2409 3441 53°48′19″N 1°38′08″W | | | |
| | Notes: National Building Register:63301: (B) | | | | |
| Waterloo Mill | | Bramley (Leeds), SE 2473 3540 53°48′51″N 1°37′33″W | | | |
| | Notes: National Building Register:63299: (C) | | | | |
| Wellington Mill | | Bramley (Leeds), SE 2473 3555 53°48′56″N 1°37′33″W | | | |
| | Notes: National Building Register:63298: (C) | | | | |
| West Field Mills | | Bramley (Leeds), SE 2337 3495 53°48′37″N 1°38′48″W | | | |
| | Notes: National Building Register:63286: (B) | | | | |

== Calverley With Farsley (Pudsey) ==
| Name | Architect | Location | Built | Demolished | Served (Years) |
|---|---|---|---|---|---|
| Calverley Mills | | Calverley With Farsley (Pudsey), SE 2206 3695 53°49′42″N 1°39′59″W | | | |
| | Notes: National Building Register:63261: (C) | | | | |
| Bank Bottom Mill | | Calverley With Farsley (Pudsey), SE 2229 3560 53°48′58″N 1°39′47″W | | | |
| | Notes: National Building Register:63264: (B) | | | | |
| Broom Mill | | Calverley With Farsley (Pudsey), SE 2230 3540 53°48′52″N 1°39′46″W | | | |
| | Notes: National Building Register:63265: (B) | | | | |
| Burlington Works | | Calverley With Farsley (Pudsey), SE 1930 3405 53°48′09″N 1°42′30″W | | | |
| | Notes: National Building Register:62596: (B) | | | | |
| Clover Greaves Mill | | Calverley With Farsley (Pudsey), SE 202 370 53°49′44″N 1°41′40″W | | | |
| | Notes: National Building Register:63871: (B) | | | | |
| Farsley Beck Bottom Mill | | Calverley With Farsley (Pudsey), | | | |
| | Notes: (see Broom Mill) | | | | |
| Holly Park Mills | | Calverley With Farsley (Pudsey), SE 2035 3655 53°49′29″N 1°41′32″W | | | |
| | Notes: National Building Register:63251: (B) | | | | |
| Lydgate Mill | | Calverley With Farsley (Pudsey), SE 2015 3700 53°49′44″N 1°41′43″W | | | |
| | Notes: National Building Register:63250: (C) | | | | |
| Mill | | Calverley With Farsley (Pudsey), SE 1912 3388 53°48′03″N 1°42′40″W | | | |
| | Notes: National Building Register:62598: (B) | | | | |
| Providence Mill | | Calverley With Farsley (Pudsey), SE 2183 3429 53°48′16″N 1°40′12″W | | | |
| | Notes: National Building Register:63256: (B) | | | | |
| Ravenscliffe Mills | | Calverley With Farsley (Pudsey), SE 1950 3675 53°49′36″N 1°42′19″W | | | |
| | Notes: National Building Register:62595: (B) | | | | |
| Rushton Mills | | Calverley With Farsley (Pudsey), SE 1915 3390 53°48′04″N 1°42′39″W | | | |
| | Notes: National Building Register:62597: (B) | | | | |
| Springfield Mills | | Calverley With Farsley (Pudsey), SE 2210 3570 53°49′02″N 1°39′57″W | | | |
| | Notes: National Building Register:63263: (B) | | | | |
| Sunny Banks Mill | | Calverley With Farsley (Pudsey), SE 2170 3535 53°48′50″N 1°40′19″W | | | |
| | Notes: National Building Register:63255: (B) | | | | |
| Thornbury Shed | | Calverley With Farsley (Pudsey), SE 1919 3385 53°48′02″N 1°42′36″W | | | |
| | Notes: National Building Register:62599: (B) | | | | |

== Farnley (Leeds) ==
| Name | Architect | Location | Built | Demolished | Served (Years) |
|---|---|---|---|---|---|
| Britannia Mill | | Farnley (Leeds), SE 2389 3179 53°46′55″N 1°38′20″W | | | |
| | Notes: National Building Register:63292: (B) | | | | |
| Butterbowl Mill | | Farnley (Leeds), SE 2575 3253 53°47′18″N 1°36′38″W | | | |
| | Notes: National Building Register:63309: (C) | | | | |
| Farnley Low Mills | | Farnley (Leeds), SE 2645 3175 53°46′53″N 1°36′00″W | | | |
| | Notes: National Building Register:63314: (B) | | | | |
| Farnley Mill | | Farnley (Leeds), SE 2395 3239 53°47′14″N 1°38′17″W | | | |
| | Notes: National Building Register:63291: (C) | | | | |
| Providence Dye Works | | Farnley (Leeds), SE 2680 3180 53°46′55″N 1°35′41″W | | | |
| | Notes: National Building Register:63872: (C) | | | | |
| Upper Mill | | Farnley (Leeds), | | | |
| | Notes: (see Britannia Mill) | | | | |

== Guiseley ==
| Name | Architect | Location | Built | Demolished | Served (Years) |
|---|---|---|---|---|---|
| Albion Dyeworks | | Guiseley, SE 1949 4220 53°52′32″N 1°42′18″W | | | |
| | Notes: National Building Register:62321: (B) | | | | |
| Cassfield Works | | Guiseley, SE 1905 4187 53°52′22″N 1°42′42″W | | | |
| | Notes: National Building Register:62323: (B) | | | | |
| Cotton Processing works | | Guiseley, SE 1858 4197 53°52′25″N 1°43′08″W | | | |
| | Notes: National Building Register:62318: (B) | | | | |
| Gordon Mills | | Guiseley, SE 1855 4271 53°52′49″N 1°43′10″W | | | |
| | Notes: National Building Register:62315: (B) | | | | |
| Green Bottom Dyeworks | | Guiseley, SE 1920 4175 53°52′18″N 1°42′34″W | | | |
| | Notes: National Building Register:62324: (B) | | | | |
| Green Bottom Mill | | Guiseley, | | | |
| | Notes: (see Green Bottom Dyeworks) | | | | |
| Guiseley Low Mill | | Guiseley, SE 1940 4110 53°51′57″N 1°42′23″W | | | |
| | Notes: National Building Register:62326: (B) | | | | |
| High Croftworks | | Guiseley, SE 1945 4240 53°52′39″N 1°42′20″W | | | |
| | Notes: National Building Register:62320: (B) | | | | |
| Liberty Mills | | Guiseley, SE 1850 4220 53°52′32″N 1°43′12″W | | | |
| | Notes: National Building Register:62317: (B) | | | | |
| Netherfield Mill | | Guiseley, SE 1875 4235 53°52′37″N 1°42′59″W | | | |
| | Notes: National Building Register:62316: (B) | | | | |
| Nunroyd Mills | | Guiseley, SE 1955 4150 53°52′10″N 1°42′15″W | | | |
| | Notes: National Building Register:62325: (B) | | | | |
| Spring Head Mill | | Guiseley, SE 1930 4205 53°52′27″N 1°42′29″W | | | |
| | Notes: National Building Register:62322: (B) | | | | |

== Headingley Cum Burley (Leeds) ==
| Name | Architect | Location | Built | Demolished | Served (Years) |
|---|---|---|---|---|---|
| Abbey (Kirkstall) Mills | | Headingley Cum Burley (Leeds), SE 2625 3571 53°49′01″N 1°36′10″W | | | |
| | Notes: National Building Register:68279: (B) | | | | |
| Burley Bridge Mills | | Headingley Cum Burley (Leeds), SE 2799 3413 53°48′10″N 1°34′35″W | | | |
| | Notes: National Building Register:63322: (B) | | | | |
| Burley Mill | | Headingley Cum Burley (Leeds), SE 2695 3477 53°48′31″N 1°35′32″W | | | |
| | Notes: National Building Register:63312: (B) | | | | |
| Burley Vale Mills | | Headingley Cum Burley (Leeds), SE 2784 3416 53°48′11″N 1°34′44″W | | | |
| | Notes: National Building Register:63321: (B) | | | | |
| Cardigan Clothing Factory | | Headingley Cum Burley (Leeds), SE 2765 3435 53°48′17″N 1°34′54″W | | | |
| | Notes: National Building Register:63318: (B) | | | | |
| Cardigan Mills | | Headingley Cum Burley (Leeds), SE 2770 3425 53°48′14″N 1°34′51″W | | | |
| | Notes: National Building Register:63319: (B) | | | | |
| Haddon Mill | | Headingley Cum Burley (Leeds), SE 2730 3462 53°48′26″N 1°35′13″W | | | |
| | Notes: National Building Register:63317: (B) | | | | |
| St Annes Mill | | Headingley Cum Burley (Leeds), SE 2637 3524 53°48′46″N 1°36′04″W | | | |
| | Notes: National Building Register:63311: (B) | | | | |
| Savins Mill | | Headingley Cum Burley (Leeds), SE 2620 3545 53°48′53″N 1°36′13″W | | | |
| | Notes: National Building Register:63310: (B) | | | | |

== Holbeck (Leeds) ==
| Name | Architect | Location | Built | Demolished | Served (Years) |
|---|---|---|---|---|---|
| Benyons’ Mill | | Holbeck (Leeds), SE 2990 3256 53°47′19″N 1°32′52″W | | | |
| | Notes: National Building Register:63344: (C) | | | | |
| Clothing Factory | | Holbeck (Leeds), | | | |
| | Notes: (see Marshall’s Mill) | | | | |
| Clothing Works | | Holbeck (Leeds), SE 2959 3285 53°47′28″N 1°33′08″W | | | |
| | Notes: National Building Register:63340: (B) | | | | |
| ClydeWorks | | Holbeck (Leeds), SE 2885 3215 53°47′05″N 1°33′49″W | | | |
| | Notes: National Building Register:63331: (B) | | | | |
| Flax Mill | | Holbeck (Leeds), SE 2960 3275 53°47′25″N 1°33′08″W | | | |
| | Notes: National Building Register:63401: (C) | | | | |
| Globe Foundry | | Holbeck (Leeds), SE 2960 3300 53°47′33″N 1°33′08″W | | | |
| | Notes: National Building Register:63338: (B) | | | | |
| Globe Mill | | Holbeck (Leeds), SE 2949 3304 53°47′34″N 1°33′14″W | | | |
| | Notes: National Building Register:63337: (B) | | | | |
| Globe Mills | | Holbeck (Leeds), SE 2985 3279 53°47′26″N 1°32′54″W | | | |
| | Notes: National Building Register:63341: (B) | | | | |
| Holbeck Clothing Works | | Holbeck (Leeds), SE 2925 3270 53°47′23″N 1°33′27″W | | | |
| | Notes: National Building Register:63343: (B) | | | | |
| Holbeck Mills | | Holbeck (Leeds), SE 2895 3258 53°47′19″N 1°33′43″W | | | |
| | Notes: National Building Register:63417: (C) | | | | |
| Holbeck Mills | | Holbeck (Leeds), | | | |
| | Notes: (see Benyons' Mill) | | | | |
| Hope Mills | | Holbeck (Leeds), SE 2985 3295 53°47′31″N 1°32′54″W | | | |
| | Notes: National Building Register:63400: (C) | | | | |
| Low Hall Mills | | Holbeck (Leeds), SE 2904 3259 53°47′20″N 1°33′39″W | | | |
| | Notes: National Building Register:63342: (B) | | | | |
| Manor Mills | | Holbeck (Leeds), SE 297 327 53°47′23″N 1°33′02″W | | | |
| | Notes: National Building Register:63873: (B) | | | | |
| Manor Road Mills | | Holbeck (Leeds), SE 2985 3270 53°47′23″N 1°32′54″W | | | |
| | Notes: National Building Register:63394: (C) | | | | |
| Marshall’s Mill | | Holbeck (Leeds), SE 2950 3265 53°47′22″N 1°33′13″W | | | |
| | Notes: National Building Register:41529: (A) | | | | |
| Round Foundry Estate | | Holbeck (Leeds), | | | |
| | Notes: (see Flax Mill) | | | | |
| Saville Works | | Holbeck (Leeds), | | | |
| | Notes: (see Clyde Works) | | | | |
| Soho Foundry Flax Mill | | Holbeck (Leeds), SE 2979 3249 53°47′16″N 1°32′58″W | | | |
| | Notes: National Building Register:63405: (C) | | | | |
| Temple Mill | | Holbeck (Leeds), | | | |
| | Notes: (see Marshall's Mill) | | | | |
| The People’s Mill | | Holbeck (Leeds), | | | |
| | Notes: (see Flax Mill) | | | | |
| Tower Works | | Holbeck (Leeds), | | | |
| | Notes: (see Globe Foundry) | | | | |
| Union Mills | | Holbeck (Leeds), SE 3008 3256 53°47′19″N 1°32′42″W | | | |
| | Notes: National Building Register:63361: (B) | | | | |
| Water Lane Mills | | Holbeck (Leeds), | | | |
| | Notes: (see Hope Mills) | | | | |

== Hunslet (Leeds) ==
| Name | Architect | Location | Built | Demolished | Served (Years) |
|---|---|---|---|---|---|
| Airedale Works | | Hunslet (Leeds), SE 3115 3249 53°47′16″N 1°31′43″W | | | |
| | Notes: National Building Register:63374: (B) | | | | |
| Balm Road Mills | | Hunslet (Leeds), SE 3105 3109 53°46′31″N 1°31′49″W | | | |
| | Notes: National Building Register:63396: (A) | | | | |
| Calf Garth Mill | | Hunslet (Leeds), SE 3115 3155 53°46′46″N 1°31′44″W | | | |
| | Notes: National Building Register:63407: (C) | | | | |
| Clothing Factory | | Hunslet (Leeds), SE 3065 3166 53°46′49″N 1°32′11″W | | | |
| | Notes: National Building Register:63362: (B) | | | | |
| Highfield Mills | | Hunslet (Leeds), SE 2987 3137 53°46′40″N 1°32′54″W | | | |
| | Notes: National Building Register:63345: (B) | | | | |
| Hunslet Flax Mill | | Hunslet (Leeds), | | | |
| | Notes: (see Balm Road Mills) | | | | |
| Hunslet Linen Works | | Hunslet (Leeds), SE 3135 3205 53°47′02″N 1°31′32″W | | | |
| | Notes: National Building Register:63378: (B) | | | | |
| Hunslet Mills | | Hunslet (Leeds), SE 314 321 53°47′03″N 1°31′30″W | | | |
| | Notes: National Building Register:63376: (B) | | | | |
| Hunslet Old Mill | | Hunslet (Leeds), SE 3155 3170 53°46′50″N 1°31′22″W | | | |
| | Notes: National Building Register:63399: (C) | | | | |
| Joseph Street Mill | | Hunslet (Leeds), SE 3101 3179 53°46′53″N 1°31′51″W | | | |
| | Notes: National Building Register:63379: (C) | | | | |
| Larchfield Mills | | Hunslet (Leeds), SE 3105 3220 53°47′07″N 1°31′49″W | | | |
| | Notes: National Building Register:63375: (C) | | | | |
| Low Road Mill | | Hunslet (Leeds), SE 3160 3145 53°46′42″N 1°31′19″W | | | |
| | Notes: National Building Register:63408: (C) | | | | |
| Potterdale Mills | | Hunslet (Leeds), SE 3015 3239 53°47′13″N 1°32′38″W | | | |
| | Notes: National Building Register:63419: (C) | | | | |
| Quebec Works | | Hunslet (Leeds), SE 2978 3217 53°47′06″N 1°32′58″W | | | |
| | Notes: National Building Register:63402: (C) | | | | |
| Robert Busk’s Flax Mill | | Hunslet (Leeds), SE 3031 3149 53°46′44″N 1°32′30″W | | | |
| | Notes: National Building Register:63406: (C) | | | | |
| Temple Works | | Hunslet (Leeds), | | | |
| | Notes: (see Joseph Street Mill) | | | | |
| Victoria Mill | | Hunslet (Leeds), SE 313 321 53°47′03″N 1°31′35″W | | | |
| | Notes: National Building Register:63377: (B) | | | | |

== Leeds ==
| Name | Architect | Location | Built | Demolished | Served (Years) |
|---|---|---|---|---|---|
| Aire Place Mills | | Leeds, SE 2826 3397 53°48′05″N 1°34′21″W | | | |
| | Notes: National Building Register:63328: (B) | | | | |
| Bank LowMills | | Leeds, SE 3111 3325 53°47′41″N 1°31′45″W | | | |
| | Notes: National Building Register:63368: (C) | | | | |
| Bank Mills | | Leeds, SE 3099 3301 53°47′33″N 1°31′52″W | | | |
| | Notes: National Building Register:63359: (A) | | | | |
| BankTop Mill | | Leeds, SE 3119 3327 53°47′41″N 1°31′41″W | | | |
| | Notes: National Building Register:63410: (C) | | | | |
| Bean lng Mills | | Leeds, SE 290 334 53°47′46″N 1°33′40″W | | | |
| | Notes: National Building Register:63389: (B) | | | | |
| Black Dog Mills | | Leeds, SE 3132 3290 53°47′29″N 1°31′34″W | | | |
| | Notes: National Building Register:63371: (B) | | | | |
| Bowman Lane Dyeworks | | Leeds, SE 3065 3313 53°47′37″N 1°32′10″W | | | |
| | Notes: National Building Register:63357: (B) | | | | |
| Buslingthorpe Mills | | Leeds, SE 3035 3525 53°48′46″N 1°32′26″W | | | |
| | Notes: National Building Register:63347: (B) | | | | |
| Byron Street Mills | | Leeds, SE 3090 3405 53°48′07″N 1°31′56″W | | | |
| | Notes: National Building Register:63353: (B) | | | | |
| Camp Hall | | Leeds, SE 2997 3295 53°47′31″N 1°32′48″W | | | |
| | Notes: National Building Register:63403: (C) | | | | |
| Carlton Cross Mills | | Leeds, SE 301 346 53°48′25″N 1°32′40″W | | | |
| | Notes: National Building Register:63398: (B) | | | | |
| Carr Mills | | Leeds, SE 3001 3561 53°48′57″N 1°32′44″W | | | |
| | Notes: National Building Register:63385: (B) | | | | |
| Clothing Factory | | Leeds, SE 2955 3356 53°47′51″N 1°33′10″W | | | |
| | Notes: National Building Register:37582: (B) | | | | |
| ClothingFactory | | Leeds, SE 2935 3389 53°48′02″N 1°33′21″W | | | |
| | Notes: National Building Register:63335: (B) | | | | |
| Clothing Factory | | Leeds, SE 3125 3474 53°48′29″N 1°31′37″W | | | |
| | Notes: National Building Register:63363: (B) | | | | |
| Clothing Manufactory | | Leeds, SE 2880 3444 53°48′20″N 1°33′51″W | | | |
| | Notes: National Building Register:63326: (B) | | | | |
| Clothing Works | | Leeds, SE 3069 3421 53°48′12″N 1°32′08″W | | | |
| | Notes: National Building Register:63351: (B) | | | | |
| Clothing Works | | Leeds, SE 3051 3401 53°48′05″N 1°32′18″W | | | |
| | Notes: National Building Register:63354: (B) | | | | |
| Clothing Works | | Leeds, SE 3050 3397 53°48′04″N 1°32′18″W | | | |
| | Notes: National Building Register:63355: (B) | | | | |
| Crown Point Dyeworks | | Leeds, SE 3085 3316 53°47′38″N 1°31′59″W | | | |
| | Notes: National Building Register:63422: (C) | | | | |
| Drying House, Saxton Lane | | Leeds, SE 3095 3339 53°47′45″N 1°31′54″W | | | |
| | Notes: National Building Register:63418: (C) | | | | |
| East Street Mills | | Leeds, SE 3105 3309 53°47′35″N 1°31′49″W | | | |
| | Notes: National Building Register:63369: (B) | | | | |
| Ellerby Lane Mills | | Leeds, SE 3145 3280 53°47′26″N 1°31′27″W | | | |
| | Notes: National Building Register:63372: (B) | | | | |
| Ellerby Road Mills | | Leeds, | | | |
| | Notes: (see Ellerby Lane Mills) | | | | |
| Elmwood Mill | | Leeds, SE 3041 3439 53°48′18″N 1°32′23″W | | | |
| | Notes: National Building Register:63350: (B) | | | | |
| Elmwood Works | | Leeds, | | | |
| | Notes: (see Elmwood Mill) | | | | |
| Empire Shoe Works | | Leeds, SE 3100 3435 53°48′16″N 1°31′51″W | | | |
| | Notes: National Building Register:63364: (B) | | | | |
| Grove Works | | Leeds, SE 3033 3440 53°48′18″N 1°32′27″W | | | |
| | Notes: National Building Register:63349: (B) | | | | |
| Harcourt Mills | | Leeds, SE 2902 3375 53°47′57″N 1°33′39″W | | | |
| | Notes: National Building Register:63391: (C) | | | | |
| Hill House Mills | | Leeds, SE 3145 3303 53°47′33″N 1°31′27″W | | | |
| | Notes: National Building Register:63370: (C) | | | | |
| Hope Foundry | | Leeds, SE 3095 3411 53°48′08″N 1°31′54″W | | | |
| | Notes: National Building Register:63387: (B) | | | | |
| Hudson Road Mills (Clothing) | | Leeds, SE 321 344 53°48′18″N 1°30′51″W | | | |
| | Notes: National Building Register:63383: (B) | | | | |
| Isles Lane Mills | | Leeds, SE 29 32 53°47′01″N 1°33′41″W | | | |
| | Notes: National Building Register:63395: (C) | | | | |
| Lady Bridge Mills | | Leeds, SE 3048 3373 53°47′56″N 1°32′19″W | | | |
| | Notes: National Building Register:63414: (C) | | | | |
| Land Court Mill | | Leeds, SE 3015 3295 53°47′31″N 1°32′38″W | | | |
| | Notes: National Building Register:63360: (C) | | | | |
| LittleTop Mill | | Leeds, SE 3120 3321 53°47′39″N 1°31′40″W | | | |
| | Notes: National Building Register:63411: (C) | | | | |
| London Works | | Leeds, SE 3115 3410 53°48′08″N 1°31′43″W | | | |
| | Notes: National Building Register:63365: (B) | | | | |
| Low Fold Mill | | Leeds, SE 3130 3275 53°47′24″N 1°31′35″W | | | |
| | Notes: National Building Register:63373: (B) | | | | |
| Mabgate Mill | | Leeds, SE 3110 3417 53°48′10″N 1°31′45″W | | | |
| | Notes: National Building Register:63386: (B) | | | | |
| Marsh Lane Mill | | Leeds, SE 3088 3335 53°47′44″N 1°31′58″W | | | |
| | Notes: National Building Register:63412: (C) | | | | |
| Millgarth Mills | | Leeds, SE 3061 3356 53°47′51″N 1°32′12″W | | | |
| | Notes: National Building Register:63392: (C) | | | | |
| Millgarth Street Mills | | Leeds, SE 3065 3362 53°47′53″N 1°32′10″W | | | |
| | Notes: National Building Register:63413: (C) | | | | |
| Nether Mills | | Leeds, SE 3089 3315 53°47′37″N 1°31′57″W | | | |
| | Notes: National Building Register:63358: (C) | | | | |
| Park Mills | | Leeds, | | | |
| | Notes: (see Bean lng Mills) | | | | |
| Perseverance Mill | | Leeds, SE 2871 3365 53°47′54″N 1°33′56″W | | | |
| | Notes: National Building Register:63390: (C) | | | | |
| Perseverance Mills | | Leeds, SE 2996 3538 53°48′50″N 1°32′47″W | | | |
| | Notes: National Building Register:63334: (B) | | | | |
| Prospect Mills | | Leeds, SE 3150 3350 53°47′49″N 1°31′24″W | | | |
| | Notes: National Building Register:63366: (B) | | | | |
| Providence Street Mill | | Leeds, SE 3126 3330 53°47′42″N 1°31′37″W | | | |
| | Notes: National Building Register:63367: (C) | | | | |
| Providence Works | | Leeds, SE 3010 3430 53°48′15″N 1°32′40″W | | | |
| | Notes: National Building Register:63348: (B) | | | | |
| Ridge Mills | | Leeds, SE 2998 3570 53°49′00″N 1°32′46″W | | | |
| | Notes: National Building Register:63333: (B) | | | | |
| Shannon Street Mills | | Leeds, SE 3128 3362 53°47′53″N 1°31′36″W | | | |
| | Notes: National Building Register:63415: (B) | | | | |
| Sheepscar Works | | Leeds, SE 3032 3530 53°48′47″N 1°32′28″W | | | |
| | Notes: National Building Register:63346: (B) | | | | |
| Spring Hill Dyeworks | | Leeds, | | | |
| | Notes: (see Buslingthorpe Mills) | | | | |
| Steander Mills | | Leeds, SE 3100 3322 53°47′40″N 1°31′51″W | | | |
| | Notes: National Building Register:63409: (C) | | | | |
| Templar Works | | Leeds, SE 3046 3375 53°47′57″N 1°32′21″W | | | |
| | Notes: National Building Register:63356: (B) | | | | |
| Trafalgar Mill | | Leeds, SE 3023 3290 53°47′29″N 1°32′33″W | | | |
| | Notes: National Building Register:63397: (C) | | | | |
| Valley Mills | | Leeds, SE 2980 3582 53°49′04″N 1°32′56″W | | | |
| | Notes: National Building Register:63332: (B) | | | | |
| Victoria Mill | | Leeds, | | | |
| | Notes: (see Shannon Street Mills) | | | | |
| Victoria Mills | | Leeds, SE 2891 3349 53°47′49″N 1°33′45″W | | | |
| | Notes: National Building Register:63420: (C) | | | | |
| Virginia Mills | | Leeds, SE 3075 3421 53°48′12″N 1°32′04″W | | | |
| | Notes: National Building Register:63352: (B) | | | | |
| Water Hall Mills | | Leeds, SE 2975 3298 53°47′32″N 1°33′00″W | | | |
| | Notes: National Building Register:63339: (B) | | | | |
| Wellington Dyeworks | | Leeds, SE 2820 3415 53°48′10″N 1°34′24″W | | | |
| | Notes: National Building Register:63327: (B) | | | | |
| Wellington Mills | | Leeds, SE 2885 3357 53°47′51″N 1°33′49″W | | | |
| | Notes: National Building Register:79300: (A) | | | | |
| Whitehall Mills | | Leeds, SE 2931 3315 53°47′38″N 1°33′24″W | | | |
| | Notes: National Building Register:63336: (B) | | | | |
| Wilson Street Mill | | Leeds, SE 3012 3290 53°47′30″N 1°32′39″W | | | |
| | Notes: National Building Register:63404: (C) | | | | |
| York Road Linen Factory | | Leeds, SE 3145 3366 53°47′54″N 1°31′26″W | | | |
| | Notes: National Building Register:63416: (C) | | | | |
| Yorkshire Dyeworks | | Leeds, SE 3215 3455 53°48′22″N 1°30′48″W | | | |
| | Notes: National Building Register:63382: (B) | | | | |

== Morley ==
| Name | Architect | Location | Built | Demolished | Served (Years) |
|---|---|---|---|---|---|
| Albion Mill | | Morley, SE 2650 2838 53°45′04″N 1°35′59″W | | | |
| | Notes: National Building Register:63577: (C) | | | | |
| Alexandra Mill | | Morley, SE 2611 2734 53°44′30″N 1°36′20″W | | | |
| | Notes: National Building Register:63590: (B) | | | | |
| Asda House | | Morley, SE 2597 2674 53°44′11″N 1°36′28″W | | | |
| | Notes: National Building Register:63652: (B) | | | | |
| Bantam Grove Dyehouse | | Morley, SE 2785 2765 53°44′40″N 1°34′45″W | | | |
| | Notes: National Building Register:63607: (B) | | | | |
| Brunswick Mill | | Morley, SE 2685 2799 53°44′51″N 1°35′40″W | | | |
| | Notes: National Building Register:63581: (B) | | | | |
| City Mill | | Morley, SE 2677 2782 53°44′46″N 1°35′44″W | | | |
| | Notes: National Building Register:63582: (B) | | | | |
| Cliffe Mill | | Morley, SE 250 273 53°44′29″N 1°37′21″W | | | |
| | Notes: National Building Register:63874: (B) | | | | |
| Commercial Street Mills | | Morley, SE 2652 2780 53°44′45″N 1°35′58″W | | | |
| | Notes: National Building Register:63585: (B) | | | | |
| Crank Mill | | Morley, SE 2685 2823 53°44′59″N 1°35′40″W | | | |
| | Notes: National Building Register:63579: (A) | | | | |
| Daisy Hill Mills | | Morley, SE 271 285 53°45′08″N 1°35′26″W | | | |
| | Notes: National Building Register:63604: (B) | | | | |
| Dean Hall Mills | | Morley, SE 2564 2809 53°44′55″N 1°36′46″W | | | |
| | Notes: National Building Register:63559: (B) | | | | |
| Deanfield Mills | | Morley, SE 2569 2860 53°45′11″N 1°36′43″W | | | |
| | Notes: National Building Register:63558: (B) | | | | |
| Field Mill | | Morley, SE 2605 2756 53°44′38″N 1°36′23″W | | | |
| | Notes: National Building Register:63588: (B) | | | | |
| Fountain Street Mills | | Morley, SE 2629 2741 53°44′33″N 1°36′10″W | | | |
| | Notes: National Building Register:63589: (B) | | | | |
| Gillroyd Mills | | Morley, SE 2740 2766 53°44′40″N 1°35′10″W | | | |
| | Notes: National Building Register:63606: (B) | | | | |
| Grove Mill | | Morley, | | | |
| | Notes: (see Bantam Grove Dyehouse) | | | | |
| Hembrigg Mill | | Morley, SE 2645 2705 53°44′21″N 1°36′02″W | | | |
| | Notes: National Building Register:63595: (B) | | | | |
| Highcliffe Mill | | Morley, SE 2551 2805 53°44′53″N 1°36′53″W | | | |
| | Notes: National Building Register:63560: (B) | | | | |
| Hollow Top Mill | | Morley, SE 2660 2702 53°44′20″N 1°35′54″W | | | |
| | Notes: National Building Register:63596: (B) | | | | |
| Low Moor Mill | | Morley, SE 2681 2805 53°44′53″N 1°35′42″W | | | |
| | Notes: National Building Register:63580: (B) | | | | |
| Lower Mill | | Morley, SE 2499 2503 53°43′16″N 1°37′22″W | | | |
| | Notes: National Building Register:63507: (B) | | | | |
| Melbourne Mills | | Morley, SE 2670 2756 53°44′37″N 1°35′48″W | | | |
| | Notes: National Building Register:63584: (B) | | | | |
| Mill | | Morley, SE 2642 2767 53°44′41″N 1°36′03″W | | | |
| | Notes: National Building Register:63587: (B) | | | | |
| Mill | | Morley, SE 2655 2730 53°44′29″N 1°35′56″W | | | |
| | Notes: National Building Register:63591: (B) | | | | |
| Mill | | Morley, SE 2645 2829 53°45′01″N 1°36′01″W | | | |
| | Notes: National Building Register:63651: (B) | | | | |
| ParkMills | | Morley, SE 2681 2765 53°44′40″N 1°35′42″W | | | |
| | Notes: National Building Register:63657: (B) | | | | |
| Parkfield Mills | | Morley, SE 2589 2736 53°44′31″N 1°36′32″W | | | |
| | Notes: National Building Register:63561: (B) | | | | |
| Peel Mill | | Morley, SE 2665 2760 53°44′39″N 1°35′51″W | | | |
| | Notes: National Building Register:63583: (B) | | | | |
| Peel Street Mills | | Morley, SE 2651 2769 53°44′42″N 1°35′58″W | | | |
| | Notes: National Building Register:63586: B) | | | | |
| Perseverance Mill | | Morley, SE 2650 2818 53°44′57″N 1°35′59″W | | | |
| | Notes: National Building Register:63578: (B) | | | | |
| Prospect Mills | | Morley, SE 2629 2834 53°45′03″N 1°36′10″W | | | |
| | Notes: National Building Register:63574: (B) | | | | |
| Providence Mill | | Morley, SE 2620 2829 53°45′01″N 1°36′15″W | | | |
| | Notes: National Building Register:63575: (C) | | | | |
| Quarry Mills | | Morley, SE 2635 2709 53°44′22″N 1°36′07″W | | | |
| | Notes: National Building Register:63594: (B) | | | | |
| Queen Mills | | Morley, SE 2629 2775 53°44′44″N 1°36′10″W | | | |
| | Notes: National Building Register:63664: (C) | | | | |
| Rods Mill | | Morley, SE 2681 2731 53°44′29″N 1°35′42″W | | | |
| | Notes: National Building Register:63592: (C) | | | | |
| Tingley Mills | | Morley, SE 2692 2670 53°44′10″N 1°35′36″W | | | |
| | Notes: National Building Register:63597: (B) | | | | |
| Valley Mills | | Morley, SE 2737 2829 53°45′01″N 1°35′11″W | | | |
| | Notes: National Building Register:63605: (C) | | | | |
| Victoria Mills | | Morley, SE 2618 2819 53°44′58″N 1°36′16″W | | | |
| | Notes: National Building Register:63576: (B) | | | | |
| Wellington Mills | | Morley, SE 2649 2719 53°44′25″N 1°35′59″W | | | |
| | Notes: National Building Register:63593: (B) | | | | |

== Otley (Aireborough; Otley) ==
| Name | Architect | Location | Built | Demolished | Served (Years) |
|---|---|---|---|---|---|
| Ackroyd Mill | | Otley, SE 1930 4520 53°54′09″N 1°42′28″W | | | |
| | Notes: National Building Register:62319: (B) | | | | |
| Eller Ghyll Mill | | Otley, SE 1780 4445 53°53′45″N 1°43′50″W | | | |
| | Notes: National Building Register:62313: (B) | | | | |
| Gill Mill | | Otley, SE 1775 4450 53°53′47″N 1°43′53″W | | | |
| | Notes: National Building Register:62312: (B) | | | | |
| Middle Mill | | Otley, SE 1796 4448 53°53′46″N 1°43′41″W | | | |
| | Notes: National Building Register:62314: (B) | | | | |
| Otley Mills | | Otley, | | | |
| | Notes: (see Ackroyd Mill) | | | | |
| Silver Hill Mill (A) | | Otley (Aireborough; Otley), SE 208 448 53°53′56″N 1°41′06″W | | | |
| | Notes: National Building Register:63249: (B) | | | | |

== Potter Newton (Leeds) ==
| Name | Architect | Location | Built | Demolished | Served (Years) |
|---|---|---|---|---|---|
| ClothingWorks | | Potter Newton (Leeds), SE 3205 3520 53°48′44″N 1°30′53″W | | | |
| | Notes: National Building Register:63381: (B) | | | | |
| Crestonaworks | | Potter Newton (Leeds), SE 3205 3535 53°48′48″N 1°30′53″W | | | |
| | Notes: National Building Register:63380: (B) | | | | |

== Pudsey ==
| Name | Architect | Location | Built | Demolished | Served (Years) |
|---|---|---|---|---|---|
| Albert Mill | | Pudsey, SE 2255 3274 53°47′26″N 1°39′33″W | | | |
| | Notes: National Building Register:63277: (B) | | | | |
| Alexandra Shed | | Pudsey, SE 1879 3220 53°47′09″N 1°42′59″W | | | |
| | Notes: National Building Register:62585: (B) | | | | |
| Brick Mills | | Pudsey, SE 2255 3286 53°47′30″N 1°39′33″W | | | |
| | Notes: National Building Register:63275: (B) | | | | |
| Cliffe Mill | | Pudsey, SE 2245 3265 53°47′23″N 1°39′39″W | | | |
| | Notes: National Building Register:63276: (B) | | | | |
| Crawshaw Mill | | Pudsey, SE 2245 3319 53°47′40″N 1°39′38″W | | | |
| | Notes: National Building Register:63272: (B) | | | | |
| DickLane Mills | | Pudsey, SE 1900 3238 53°47′15″N 1°42′47″W | | | |
| | Notes: National Building Register:62600: (B) | | | | |
| Firland Mill | | Pudsey, SE 2236 3283 53°47′29″N 1°39′43″W | | | |
| | Notes: National Building Register:63274: (B) | | | | |
| Gibraltar Mill | | Pudsey, SE 2079 3323 53°47′42″N 1°41′09″W | | | |
| | Notes: National Building Register:63252: (C) | | | | |
| Grangefield Mill | | Pudsey, SE 2242 3435 53°48′18″N 1°39′40″W | | | |
| | Notes: National Building Register:63268: (B) | | | | |
| Leigh Mills | | Pudsey, SE 2185 3412 53°48′10″N 1°40′11″W | | | |
| | Notes: National Building Register:63257: (B) | | | | |
| NewLane Mills | | Pudsey, SE 1900 3280 53°47′28″N 1°42′47″W | | | |
| | Notes: National Building Register:62582: (B) | | | | |
| New Street Mills | | Pudsey, SE 2200 3278 53°47′27″N 1°40′03″W | | | |
| | Notes: National Building Register:63273: (A) | | | | |
| Priestley Mill | | Pudsey, SE 2295 3400 53°48′06″N 1°39′11″W | | | |
| | Notes: National Building Register:63269: (B) | | | | |
| Prospect Mill | | Pudsey, SE 2175 3345 53°47′49″N 1°40′17″W | | | |
| | Notes: National Building Register:63258: (B) | | | | |
| South Park Mills | | Pudsey, SE 2260 3160 53°46′49″N 1°39′31″W | | | |
| | Notes: National Building Register:63280: (B) | | | | |
| Southroyd Mill | | Pudsey, SE 2257 3218 53°47′08″N 1°39′32″W | | | |
| | Notes: National Building Register:63279: (B) | | | | |
| Troydale Mills | | Pudsey, SE 2390 3250 53°47′18″N 1°38′19″W | | | |
| | Notes: National Building Register:63290: (B) | | | | |
| Try Mill | | Pudsey, SE 2238 3329 53°47′44″N 1°39′42″W | | | |
| | Notes: National Building Register:63271: (B) | | | | |
| Union Bridge Mill | | Pudsey, SE 2370 3159 53°46′48″N 1°38′31″W | | | |
| | Notes: National Building Register:63293: (B) | | | | |
| Union Mill | | Pudsey, SE 2290 3267 53°47′23″N 1°39′14″W | | | |
| | Notes: National Building Register:63278: (C) | | | | |
| Valley Mills | | Pudsey, SE 2305 3275 53°47′26″N 1°39′06″W | | | |
| | Notes: National Building Register:63289: (B) | | | | |
| Water1oo Mills | | Pudsey, SE 2105 3320 53°47′41″N 1°40′55″W | | | |
| | Notes: National Building Register:63259: (B) | | | | |
| Wellington Mills | | Pudsey, SE 1875 3267 53°47′24″N 1°43′01″W | | | |
| | Notes: National Building Register:62581: (B) | | | | |

== Rawdon (Aireborough) ==
| Name | Architect | Location | Built | Demolished | Served (Years) |
|---|---|---|---|---|---|
| Airedale Park Mills | | Rawdon (Aireborough), SE 2192 3875 53°50′40″N 1°40′06″W | | | |
| | Notes: National Building Register:63253: (B) | | | | |
| Green Lane Dyeworks | | Rawdon (Aireborough), SE 2085 4035 53°51′32″N 1°41′04″W | | | |
| | Notes: National Building Register:63245: (B) | | | | |
| Green Lane Mill | | Rawdon (Aireborough), | | | |
| | Notes: (see Green Lane Dyeworks) | | | | |
| Low Mills | | Rawdon (Aireborough), SE 2175 3765 53°50′05″N 1°40′16″W | | | |
| | Notes: National Building Register:63254: (B) | | | | |

== Wortley (Leeds) ==
| Name | Architect | Location | Built | Demolished | Served (Years) |
|---|---|---|---|---|---|
| Canal Mills | | Wortley (Leeds), SE 2860 3346 53°47′48″N 1°34′02″W | | | |
| | Notes: National Building Register:63329 : (B) | | | | |
| Castleton Mill | | Wortley (Leeds), SE 2869 3341 53°47′46″N 1°33′57″W | | | |
| | Notes: National Building Register:63384: (A) | | | | |
| Junction Mills | | Wortley (Leeds), SE 2874 3293 53°47′31″N 1°33′55″W | | | |
| | Notes: National Building Register:63330: (C) | | | | |
| Stone Bridge Mills | | Wortley (Leeds), SE 2560 3286 53°47′29″N 1°36′46″W | | | |
| | Notes: National Building Register:63308: (A) | | | | |
| Swallow Hi1l Mills | | Wortley (Leeds), SE 2599 3299 53°47′33″N 1°36′25″W | | | |
| | Notes: National Building Register:63307 : (B) | | | | |
| Upper Mill | | Wortley (Leeds), SE 2671 3181 53°46′55″N 1°35′46″W | | | |
| | Notes: National Building Register:63315 : (B) | | | | |
| Wortley Low Mills | | Wortley (Leeds), | | | |
| | Notes: (see Upper Mill (B) 3869) | | | | |

== Yeadon (Aireborough) ==
| Name | Architect | Location | Built | Demolished | Served (Years) |
|---|---|---|---|---|---|
| Albert Mills | | Yeadon (Aireborough), SE 2129 4120 53°52′00″N 1°40′40″W | | | |
| | Notes: National Building Register:63246: (C) | | | | |
| Bankfield Dyeworks | | Yeadon (Aireborough), SE 2075 4150 53°52′09″N 1°41′09″W | | | |
| | Notes: National Building Register:63239: (B) | | | | |
| Green Lane Dyeworks | | Yeadon (Aireborough), SE 2085 4035 53°51′32″N 1°41′04″W | | | |
| | Notes: National Building Register:63245: (B) | | | | |
| Green Lane Mill | | Yeadon (Aireborough), | | | |
| | Notes: (see Green Lane Dyeworks) | | | | |
| Kirk Lane Mills | | Yeadon (Aireborough), SE 2030 4105 53°51′55″N 1°41′34″W | | | |
| | Notes: National Building Register:63242: (B) | | | | |
| Leafield Mills | | Yeadon (Aireborough), SE 2015 4110 53°51′57″N 1°41′42″W | | | |
| | Notes: National Building Register:63241: (C) | | | | |
| Manor Mills | | Yeadon (Aireborough), SE 2055 4116 53°51′58″N 1°41′20″W | | | |
| | Notes: National Building Register:63240: (C) | | | | |
| Moorfield Mills | | Yeadon (Aireborough), SE 2150 4097 53°51′52″N 1°40′28″W | | | |
| | Notes: National Building Register:63248: (C) | | | | |
| Westfield Mills | | Yeadon (Aireborough), SE 204 409 53°51′50″N 1°41′29″W | | | |
| | Notes: National Building Register:63244: (B) | | | | |
| Yeadon Old Mills / Old Dog Mill | | Yeadon (Aireborough), SE 2056 4107 53°51′56″N 1°41′20″W | | | |
| | Notes: National Building Register:63243: (B) | | | | |
