= List of mills in Wakefield =

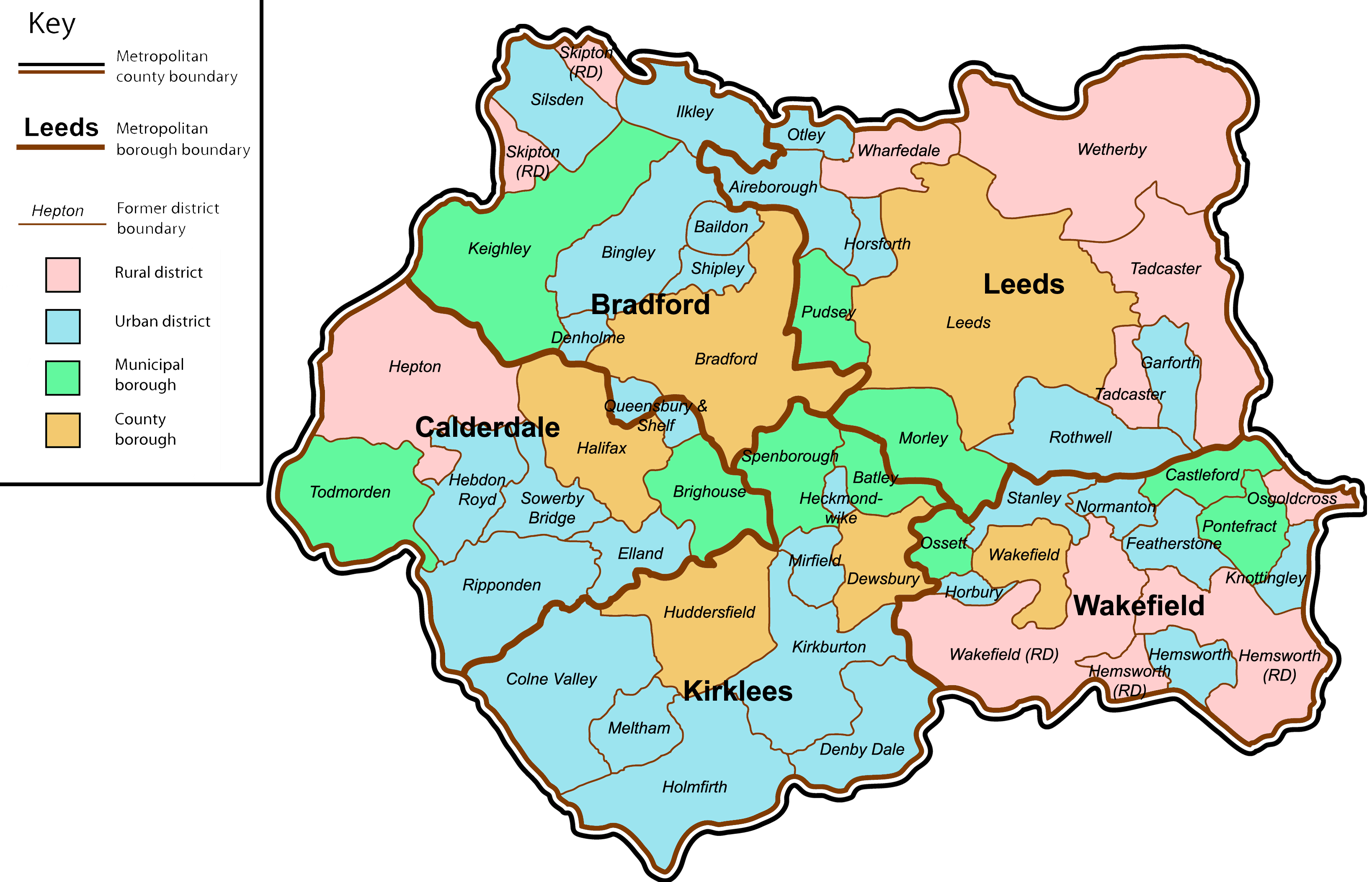
Wakefield in West Yorkshire, England

This is a list of the wool, cotton and other textile mills in Wakefield: including Castleford, Ossett and Pontefract.

== Alverthorpe With Thornes (Wakefield) ==
Name	Architect	Location	Built	Demolished	Served (Years)
Alverthorpe Mills		Alverthorpe With Thornes (Wakefield), SE 3090 2140 53°41′17″N 1°32′01″W			
	Notes: National Building Register:63624: (A)				
Balne Lane Mills		Alverthorpe With Thornes (Wakefield), SE 3215 2135 53°41′15″N 1°30′53″W			
	Notes: National Building Register:63628: (B)				
Balne Mill		Alverthorpe With Thornes (Wakefield),			
	Notes: (see Balne Lane Mills)				
Bective Mills		Alverthorpe With Thornes (Wakefield), SE 310 211 53°41′08″N 1°31′56″W			
	Notes: National Building Register:63627: (C)				
Calder Dyeworks		Alverthorpe With Thornes (Wakefield), SE 327 187 53°39′50″N 1°30′24″W			
	Notes: National Building Register:63767: (C)				
Clarkson's Mill		Alverthorpe With Thornes (Wakefield), SE 3208 2055 53°40′50″N 1°30′57″W			
	Notes: National Building Register:63629: (B)				
Flanshaw Mill		Alverthorpe With Thornes (Wakefield), SE 3080 2095 53°41′03″N 1°32′07″W			
	Notes: National Building Register:63625: (A)				
Hebble Mill		Alverthorpe With Thornes (Wakefield),			
	Notes: (see Bective Mills)				
Oakes Mill		Alverthorpe With Thornes (Wakefield),			
	Notes: (see Flanshaw Mill)				
Portobello Mills		Alverthorpe With Thornes (Wakefield), SE 335 195 53°40′15″N 1°29′40″W			
	Notes: National Building Register:63768: (C)				
Thornes Mill		Alverthorpe With Thornes (Wakefield), SE 327 190 53°39′59″N 1°30′24″W			
	Notes: National Building Register:63766: (C)				
West Riding Mills		Alverthorpe With Thornes (Wakefield),			
	Notes: (see Calder Dyeworks)				
Westgate Common Mill		Alverthorpe With Thornes (Wakefield),			
	Notes: (see C1arkson's Mill)				

== Horbury ==
Name	Architect	Location	Built	Demolished	Served (Years)
Addingford Mills		Horbury, SE 2915 1767 53°39′17″N 1°33′38″W			
	Notes: National Building Register:63764: (B)				
Albert Mill		Horbury, SE 2875 1792 53°39′25″N 1°33′59″W			
	Notes: National Building Register:63760: (B)				
Albion Mills		Horbury, SE 2845 1799 53°39′27″N 1°34′16″W			
	Notes: National Building Register:63757: (B)				
Dudfleet Mill		Horbury, SE 2995 1735 53°39′06″N 1°32′54″W			
	Notes: National Building Register:63765: (B)				
Ford Mill		Horbury, SE 2872 1798 53°39′27″N 1°34′01″W			
	Notes: National Building Register:63759: (B)				
Horbury Bridge Mill		Horbury, SE 2789 1820 53°39′34″N 1°34′46″W			
	Notes: National Building Register:63752: (B)				
Manor Mills		Horbury, SE 2890 1930 53°40′10″N 1°33′51″W			
	Notes: National Building Register:63756: (C)				
Navigation Mill		Horbury, SE 2815 1798 53°39′27″N 1°34′32″W			
	Notes: National Building Register:63771: (B)				
New Mill		Horbury,			
	Notes: (see Horbury Bridge Mill)				
Peel Mills		Horbury, SE 2942 1809 53°39′30″N 1°33′23″W			
	Notes: National Building Register:63763: (B)				
Terry Mills		Horbury, SE 2885 1860 53°39′47″N 1°33′54″W			
	Notes: National Building Register:63773: (B)				
Victoria Mill		Horbury, SE 2850 1797 53°39′27″N 1°34′13″W			
	Notes: National Building Register:63758: (B)				

== Stanley Cum Wrenthorpe (Stanley) ==
Name	Architect	Location	Built	Demolished	Served (Years)
Stanley Mills		Stanley Cum Wrenthorpe (Stanley), SE 3408 2472 53°43′04″N 1°29′06″W			
	Notes: National Building Register:63632: (B)				

== Wakefield ==
Name	Architect	Location	Built	Demolished	Served (Years)
Albion Mills		Wakefield, SE 3275 2050 53°40′48″N 1°30′20″W			
	Notes: National Building Register:63630: (B)				
Castle Bank Mill		Wakefield, SE 3375 1940 53°40′12″N 1°29′26″W			
	Notes: National Building Register:63769: (B)				
Chald Mill		Wakefield, SE 3 2 53°40′32″N 1°32′50″W			
	Notes: National Building Register:63663: (C)				
Providence Mills		Wakefield, SE 3265 2040 53°40′45″N 1°30′26″W			
	Notes: National Building Register:63631: (B)				
Westgate New Mills		Wakefield, SE 3 2 53°40′32″N 1°32′50″W			
	Notes: National Building Register:63665: (C)				
Whiteoak Mills		Wakefield,			
	Notes: (see Providence Mills)				

== See also ==
- Heavy Woollen District
- Textile processing
