= List of mills in Bradford =

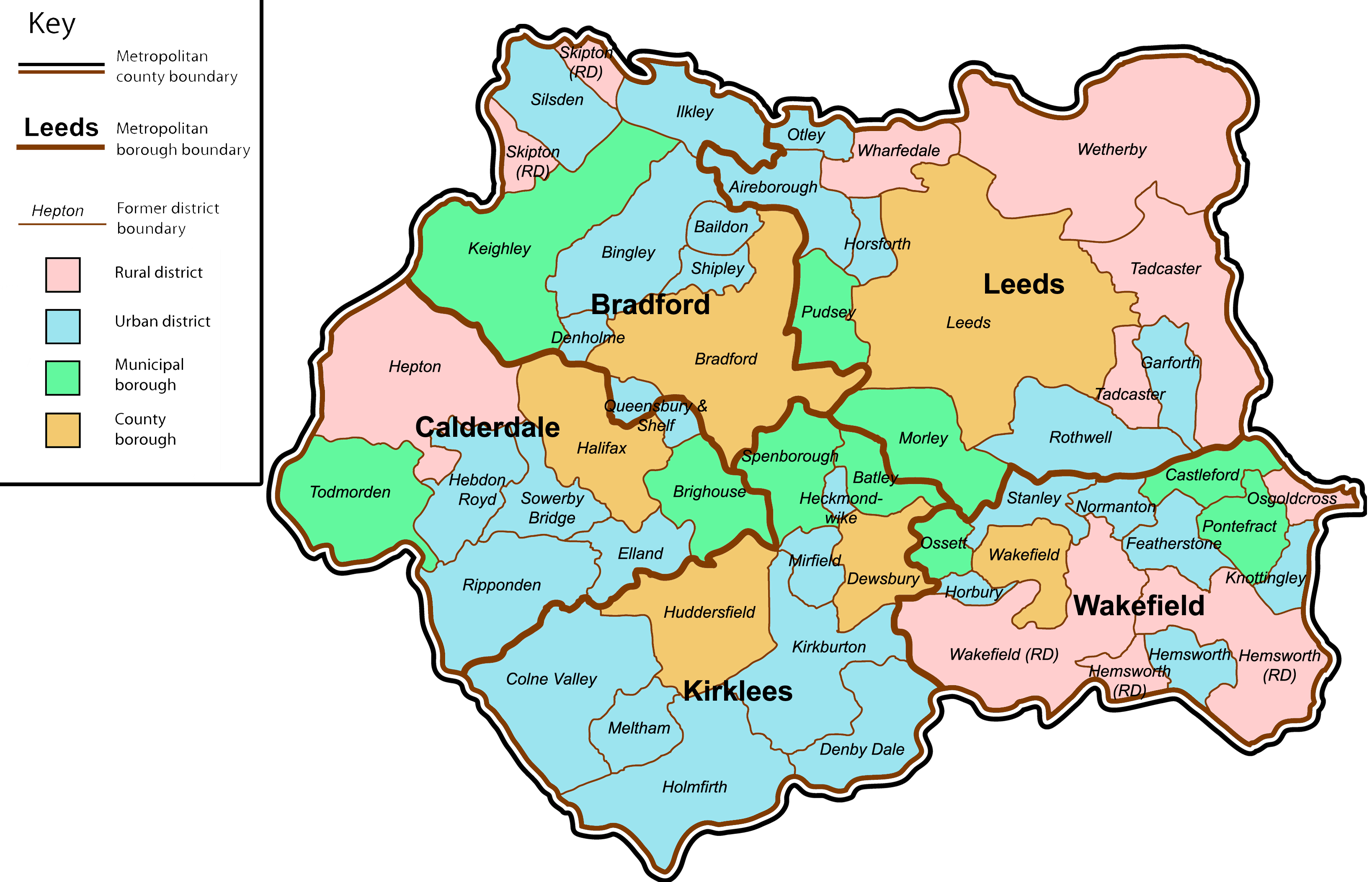
Bradford, part of the metropolitan borough of the City of Bradford in West Yorkshire County, England

This is a list of the wool, cotton and other textile mills in Bradford, the largest settlement in the Metropolitan Borough of Bradford in West Yorkshire, England.

== Allerton (Bradford) ==
Name	Architect	Location	Built	Demolished	Served (Years)
Allerton Mill		Allerton (Bradford), SE 1215 3416 53°48′13″N 1°49′01″W			
	Notes: National Building Register:62408: (B)				
Crossley Hall Dyeworks		Allerton (Bradford), SE 1325 3310 53°47′39″N 1°48′01″W			
	Notes: National Building Register:62425: (B)				
Dyeworks		Allerton (Bradford), SE 1303 3337 53°47′47″N 1°48′13″W			
	Notes: National Building Register:62418: (B)				
Fairweather Green Mills		Allerton (Bradford), SE 1350 3335 53°47′47″N 1°47′48″W			
	Notes: National Building Register:62420: (B)				
Hedge Nook Mill		Allerton (Bradford), SE 1205 3410 53°48′11″N 1°49′07″W			
	Notes: National Building Register:62409: (B)				
Napier Works		Allerton (Bradford), SE 1340 3322 53°47′42″N 1°47′53″W			
	Notes: National Building Register:62421: (B)				
ProspectMill		Allerton (Bradford), SE 1240 3414 53°48′12″N 1°48′48″W			
	Notes: National Building Register:62410: (B)				
Sydney Works		Allerton (Bradford), SE 1340 3330 53°47′45″N 1°47′53″W			
	Notes: National Building Register:62419: (B)				
Top Mill		Allerton (Bradford), SE 1185 3440 53°48′21″N 1°49′18″W			
	Notes: National Building Register:62406: (C)				

== Bolton (Bradford) ==
Name	Architect	Location	Built	Demolished	Served (Years)
Bolton Woods Mill		Bolton (Bradford), SE 1595 3620 53°49′19″N 1°45′33″W			
	Notes: National Building Register:62473: (B)				
Mill		Bolton (Bradford), SE 1615 3415 53°48′12″N 1°45′23″W			
	Notes: National Building Register:62514: (B)				
Oswin Mills		Bolton (Bradford), SE 1565 3590 53°49′09″N 1°45′50″W			
	Notes: National Building Register:62475: (B)				

== Bowling (Bradford) ==
Name	Architect	Location	Built	Demolished	Served (Years)
Albion Dyeworks		Bowling (Bradford), SE 1795 3085 53°46′25″N 1°43′45″W			
	Notes: National Building Register:62560: (B)				
Albion Mill		Bowling (Bradford), SE 1798 3080 53°46′24″N 1°43′43″W			
	Notes: National Building Register:62562: (B)				
Alma Mill		Bowling (Bradford), SE 1855 3158 53°46′49″N 1°43′12″W			
	Notes: National Building Register:62586: (B)				
Bowling Dyeworks		Bowling (Bradford), SE 167 315 53°46′46″N 1°44′53″W			
	Notes: National Building Register:62536:)(B)				
Bowling Mills		Bowling (Bradford), SE 1658 3197 53°47′02″N 1°44′59″W			
	Notes: National Building Register:62534: (B)				
Broad Lane Mill		Bowling (Bradford), SE 1860 3205 53°47′04″N 1°43′09″W			
	Notes: National Building Register:62584: (B)				
Cabinet Works, former		Bowling (Bradford), SE 1700 3220 53°47′09″N 1°44′36″W			
	Notes: National Building Register:62622: (B)				
Central Mills		Bowling (Bradford), SE 1619 3079 53°46′23″N 1°45′21″W			
	Notes: National Building Register:62539: (B)				
Duiness Street Mill		Bowling (Bradford), SE 1659 3225 53°47′11″N 1°44′59″W			
	Notes: National Building Register:62525: (B)				
Globe Mills		Bowling (Bradford), SE 1698 3225 53°47′11″N 1°44′38″W			
	Notes: National Building Register:62528: (B)				
Harold Mills		Bowling (Bradford), SE 1755 3215 53°47′07″N 1°44′06″W			
	Notes: National Building Register:62559: (B)				
Holroyd Mills		Bowling (Bradford), SE 1542 3042 53°46′12″N 1°46′03″W			
	Notes: National Building Register:62508: (B)				
Ivy Mills		Bowling (Bradford), SE 1655 3219 53°47′09″N 1°45′01″W			
	Notes: National Building Register:62526: (B)				
Ladywell Mills		Bowling (Bradford), SE 1690 3220 53°47′09″N 1°44′42″W			
	Notes: National Building Register:62527: (B)				
Laundry		Bowling (Bradford), SE 1712 3211 53°47′06″N 1°44′30″W			
	Notes: National Building Register:62623: (B)				
Marshfield Dyeworks		Bowling (Bradford), SE 1585 3108 53°46′33″N 1°45′40″W			
	Notes: National Building Register:62504: (B)				
Marshfield Mills		Bowling (Bradford), SE 1580 3100 53°46′30″N 1°45′42″W			
	Notes: National Building Register:62505: (B)				
Melange Mills		Bowling (Bradford), SE 1646 3192 53°47′00″N 1°45′06″W			
	Notes: National Building Register:62533*: (B)				
Mill		Bowling (Bradford), SE 1671 3239 53°47′15″N 1°44′52″W			
	Notes: National Building Register:2524: B)				
Mill		Bowling (Bradford), SE 1732 3221 53°47′09″N 1°44′19″W			
	Notes: National Building Register:62625: (B)				
Mill		Bowling (Bradford), SE 1819 3099 53°46′30″N 1°43′32″W			
	Notes: National Building Register:62626: (B)				
Moorside Mill		Bowling (Bradford), SE 1725 3204 53°47′04″N 1°44′23″W			
	Notes: National Building Register:62624: (B)				
New Industry Mill		Bowling (Bradford), SE 1975 3085 53°46′25″N 1°42′07″W			
	Notes: National Building Register:62588: (B)				
New Mill		Bowling (Bradford),			
	Notes: (see Albion Mill)				
Parkside Mill		Bowling (Bradford), SE 1620 3082 53°46′24″N 1°45′20″W			
	Notes: National Building Register:62538: (B)				
Peace Mills		Bowling (Bradford), SE 1645 3096 53°46′29″N 1°45′07″W			
	Notes: National Building Register:62537: (B)				
Prospect Mills		Bowling (Bradford), SE 1715 3225 53°47′11″N 1°44′28″W			
	Notes: National Building Register:62557: (C)				
Recta Mill		Bowling (Bradford), SE 1800 3092 53°46′27″N 1°43′42″W			
	Notes: National Building Register:62561: (B)				
Spring Mill		Bowling (Bradford), SE 1645 3195 53°47′01″N 1°45′07″W			
	Notes: National Building Register:62530*: (B)				
Springfield Mill		Bowling (Bradford), SE 1646 3182 53°46′57″N 1°45′06″W			
	Notes: National Building Register:62533*: (B)				
Springhead Mills		Bowling (Bradford), SE 1636 3192 53°47′00″N 1°45′11″W			
	Notes: National Building Register:62532: (B)				
Terry's Mill		Bowling (Bradford), SE 1820 3118 53°46′36″N 1°43′31″W			
	Notes: National Building Register:62587: (B)				
Upper Croft Mills		Bowling (Bradford), SE 1835 3232 53°47′13″N 1°43′23″W			
	Notes: National Building Register:62583: (B)				
Victoria Mills		Bowling (Bradford), SE 1739 3219 53°47′09″N 1°44′15″W			
	Notes: National Building Register:62558: (B)				
West Bowling Shed		Bowling (Bradford), SE 1611 3070 53°46′21″N 1°45′25″W			
	Notes: National Building Register:62540: (B)				

== Bradford ==
Name	Architect	Location	Built	Demolished	Served (Years)
Albion Works		Bradford, SE 1865 3263 53°47′23″N 1°43′06″W			
	Notes: National Building Register:62580: (B)				
Barkerend Mills		Bradford, SE 1745 3345 53°47′49″N 1°44′12″W			
	Notes: National Building Register:62549*: (A)				
Bower Green Shed		Bradford, SE 1829 3280 53°47′28″N 1°43′26″W			
	Notes: National Building Register:62575: (B)				
Bradford Moor Mill		Bradford, SE 1870 3320 53°47′41″N 1°43′03″W			
	Notes: National Building Register:62571: (B)				
Carlisle Mills		Bradford, SE 15 33 53°47′35″N 1°46′26″W			
	Notes: National Building Register:4: 626				
Cashmere Works		Bradford, SE 1789 3266 53°47′24″N 1°43′48″W			
	Notes: National Building Register:62556: (B)				
City Paper Mills		Bradford, SE 1686 3348 53°47′50″N 1°44′44″W			
	Notes: National Building Register:62631: (B)				
College Mill		Bradford, SE 1690 3331 53°47′45″N 1°44′42″W			
	Notes: National Building Register:62669: (B)				
Conditioning House		Bradford, SE 1648 3390 53°48′04″N 1°45′05″W			
	Notes: National Building Register:62682: (B)				
Croft Boiler Works		Bradford, SE 1822 3275 53°47′27″N 1°43′30″W			
	Notes: National Building Register:62574: (B)				
Dyeworks		Bradford, SE 166 331 53°47′38″N 1°44′58″W			
	Notes: National Building Register:679:) 6				
Eastbrook Mills		Bradford, SE 1700 3295 53°47′33″N 1°44′36″W			
	Notes: National Building Register:62552: (B)				
Exchange Mills		Bradford, SE 167 327 53°47′25″N 1°44′53″W			
	Notes: National Building Register:672:) 6				
Garden Mill		Bradford, SE 1587 3301 53°47′35″N 1°45′38″W			
	Notes: National Building Register:62614: (B)				
Greenhill Mill		Bradford, SE 1840 3280 53°47′28″N 1°43′20″W			
	Notes: National Building Register:62576: (B)				
Greystone Mill		Bradford, SE 1772 3340 53°47′48″N 1°43′57″W			
	Notes: National Building Register:62551: (B)				
Harris Mills		Bradford, SE 1714 3328 53°47′44″N 1°44′29″W			
	Notes: National Building Register:62630: (B)				
Harris Street Works		Bradford, SE 1709 3327 53°47′44″N 1°44′31″W			
	Notes: National Building Register:62548: (B)				
High Street Mills		Bradford,			
	Notes: (see Barkerend Mills)				
Hillside Mills		Bradford, SE 1790 3275 53°47′27″N 1°43′47″W			
	Notes: National Building Register:62555: (B)				
Holling's Mill		Bradford, SE 15 33 53°47′35″N 1°46′26″W			
	Notes: National Building Register:3: 626				
Hollings Mill		Bradford, SE 1580 3315 53°47′40″N 1°45′42″W			
	Notes: National Building Register:62492: (B)				
Holme Mill		Bradford, SE 1590 3300 53°47′35″N 1°45′36″W			
	Notes: National Building Register:62612: (B)				
Hope Mills		Bradford, SE 185 328 53°47′28″N 1°43′14″W			
	Notes: National Building Register:577:) 6				
Hubert Shed		Bradford, SE 1802 3272 53°47′26″N 1°43′41″W			
	Notes: National Building Register:62572: (B)				
Industry Mill		Bradford, SE 1548 3336 53°47′47″N 1°45′59″W			
	Notes: National Building Register:62485: (B)				
junction Mill		Bradford, SE 1870 3284 53°47′29″N 1°43′03″W			
	Notes: National Building Register:62579: (B)				
junction Mill		Bradford, SE 1582 3302 53°47′36″N 1°45′41″W			
	Notes: National Building Register:62613: (B)				
Kyme Mill		Bradford,			
	Notes: (see Bradford Moor Mill)				
Lonsdale Works		Bradford,			
	Notes: (see Hillside Mills)				
Midland Mills		Bradford, SE 1649 3380 53°48′01″N 1°45′04″W			
	Notes: National Building Register:62518: (B)				
Mill		Bradford, SE 1588 3301 53°47′35″N 1°45′38″W			
	Notes: National Building Register:62491: (B)				
Mill		Bradford, SE 1605 3310 53°47′38″N 1°45′28″W			
	Notes: National Building Register:62495: (B)				
Mill		Bradford, SE 1596 3303 53°47′36″N 1°45′33″W			
	Notes: National Building Register:62496: (B)				
Mill		Bradford, SE 1530 3348 53°47′51″N 1°46′09″W			
	Notes: National Building Register:62608: (B)				
Mill		Bradford, SE 1761 3249 53°47′18″N 1°44′03″W			
	Notes: National Building Register:62621: (B)				
Mill		Bradford, SE 1695 3329 53°47′44″N 1°44′39″W			
	Notes: National Building Register:62670: (B)				
Moorside Mill		Bradford,			
	Notes: (see Bradford Moor Mill)				
Mount Street Mills		Bradford, SE 1743 3278 53°47′28″N 1°44′13″W			
	Notes: National Building Register:62553: (B)				
Norcroft Dyeworks		Bradford, SE 1545 3330 53°47′45″N 1°46′01″W			
	Notes: National Building Register:62604: (B)				
North Brook Mills		Bradford, SE 1649 3372 53°47′58″N 1°45′04″W			
	Notes: National Building Register:62519: (C)				
North Vale Mills		Bradford, SE 1645 3398 53°48′07″N 1°45′06″W			
	Notes: National Building Register:62517: (B)				
Onward Works		Bradford, SE 1753 3285 53°47′30″N 1°44′07″W			
	Notes: National Building Register:62629: (B)				
Penny Oaks Mill		Bradford, SE 1770 3282 53°47′29″N 1°43′58″W			
	Notes: National Building Register:62554: (C)				
Pit Lane Mills		Bradford, SE 1749 3325 53°47′43″N 1°44′09″W			
	Notes: National Building Register:62550: (B)				
Priestley's Warehouse		Bradford, SE 167 331 53°47′38″N 1°44′53″W			
	Notes: National Building Register:686:) 6				
Providence Mills		Bradford, SE 1590 3311 53°47′39″N 1°45′36″W			
	Notes: National Building Register:62493: (B)				
Raglan Foundry		Bradford, SE 1812 3279 53°47′28″N 1°43′35″W			
	Notes: National Building Register:62628: (B)				
Raglan Mills		Bradford, SE 1809 3272 53°47′26″N 1°43′37″W			
	Notes: National Building Register:62573: (B)				
Rock Mills		Bradford, SE 1710 3330 53°47′45″N 1°44′31″W			
	Notes: National Building Register:62547: (B)				
Soho Mills		Bradford, SE 1589 3308 53°47′38″N 1°45′37″W			
	Notes: National Building Register:62610: (B)				
The Wool Exchange		Bradford, SE 1640 3311 53°47′39″N 1°45′09″W			
	Notes: National Building Register:62684: (B)				
Thompson Shed		Bradford, SE 1599 3319 53°47′41″N 1°45′31″W			
	Notes: National Building Register:62494: (B)				
Vicuna Works		Bradford, SE 1876 3291 53°47′32″N 1°43′00″W			
	Notes: National Building Register:62578: (B)				
Wappingworks		Bradford, SE 1690 3375 53°47′59″N 1°44′42″W			
	Notes: National Building Register:62520: (B)				
Warehouse		Bradford, SE 1589 3301 53°47′35″N 1°45′37″W			
	Notes: National Building Register:62611: (B)				
Warehouse: QuebecStreet		Bradford, SE 1615 3294 53°47′33″N 1°45′23″W			
	Notes: National Building Register:62683: (B)				
Wool Warehouse		Bradford, SE 167 331 53°47′38″N 1°44′53″W			
	Notes: National Building Register:685:) 6				
Woolston warehouses		Bradford, SE 1596 3316 53°47′40″N 1°45′33″W			
	Notes: National Building Register:62615: (B)				
Zetland Mill		Bradford, SE 1554 3401 53°48′08″N 1°45′56″W			
	Notes: National Building Register:62516*: (A)				

== Heaton (Bradford) ==
Name	Architect	Location	Built	Demolished	Served (Years)
DumbMill		Heaton (Bradford), SE 1530 3635 53°49′23″N 1°46′09″W			
	Notes: National Building Register:62470: (B)				
Frizinghall Works		Heaton (Bradford), SE 1525 3630 53°49′22″N 1°46′11″W			
	Notes: National Building Register:62471: (B)				
Showers Mill		Heaton (Bradford), SE 1530 3595 53°49′11″N 1°46′09″W			
	Notes: National Building Register:62474: (B)				
Springfield Mills		Heaton (Bradford), SE 1119 3560 53°49′00″N 1°49′53″W			
	Notes: National Building Register:62405: (B)				

== Horton (Bradford) ==
Name	Architect	Location	Built	Demolished	Served (Years)
Albert Mills		Horton (Bradford), SE 1550 3310 53°47′38″N 1°45′58″W			
	Notes: National Building Register:62487: (C)				
Albion Mills		Horton (Bradford), SE 1585 3156 53°46′48″N 1°45′39″W			
	Notes: National Building Register:62501: (B)				
Albion Works		Horton (Bradford),			
	Notes: (see Albion Mills)				
Ashfield Mills		Horton (Bradford), SE 1525 3330 53°47′45″N 1°46′12″W			
	Notes: National Building Register:62484: (B)				
Aslan House		Horton (Bradford), SE 1559 3310 53°47′38″N 1°45′53″W			
	Notes: National Building Register:62617: (B)				
Atlas Mills		Horton (Bradford), SE 1560 3300 53°47′35″N 1°45′53″W			
	Notes: National Building Register:62488: (B)				
Bank Top Mills		Horton (Bradford), SE 1270 3065 53°46′19″N 1°48′32″W			
	Notes: National Building Register:62415: (B)				
Beckside Dyeworks		Horton (Bradford), SE 1399 3198 53°47′02″N 1°47′21″W			
	Notes: National Building Register:62426: (B)				
Beckside Mills		Horton (Bradford), SE 1405 3185 53°46′58″N 1°47′18″W			
	Notes: National Building Register:62451: (B)				
Beehive Mills		Horton (Bradford), SE 1566 3309 53°47′38″N 1°45′50″W			
	Notes: National Building Register:62489: (B)				
Bentley Mills		Horton (Bradford), SE 1410 3275 53°47′27″N 1°47′15″W			
	Notes: National Building Register:62448: (C)				
Bowling Mill		Horton (Bradford), SE 1625 3195 53°47′01″N 1°45′17″W			
	Notes: National Building Register:62531: (B)				
Briggella Mills		Horton (Bradford), SE 1551 3140 53°46′43″N 1°45′58″W			
	Notes: National Building Register:62502: (B)				
Britannia Mills		Horton (Bradford), SE 1650 3255 53°47′20″N 1°45′04″W			
	Notes: National Building Register:62522: (B)				
Caledonia Works		Horton (Bradford), SE 1651 3241 53°47′16″N 1°45′03″W			
	Notes: National Building Register:62523: (B)				
Cannon Mills		Horton (Bradford), SE 1450 3205 53°47′04″N 1°46′53″W			
	Notes: National Building Register:62450*: (A)				
Carrara Mill		Horton (Bradford), SE 1631 3207 53°47′05″N 1°45′14″W			
	Notes: National Building Register:62529: (B)				
Cartwright Mills		Horton (Bradford), SE 1445 3292 53°47′33″N 1°46′56″W			
	Notes: National Building Register:62444: (B)				
Cliff Mills		Horton (Bradford), SE 1370 3130 53°46′40″N 1°47′37″W			
	Notes: National Building Register:62428: (B)				
CrossLane Mills		Horton (Bradford), SE 1453 3175 53°46′55″N 1°46′51″W			
	Notes: National Building Register:62452: (B)				
Cusson's Mill		Horton (Bradford),			
	Notes: (see Cross Lane Mills)				
Douglas Mills		Horton (Bradford), SE 1620 3185 53°46′58″N 1°45′20″W			
	Notes: National Building Register:62619: (B)				
Fieldhead Mills		Horton (Bradford), SE 1514 3330 53°47′45″N 1°46′18″W			
	Notes: National Building Register:62483: (C)				
Grange Shed		Horton (Bradford), SE 1455 3220 53°47′09″N 1°46′50″W			
	Notes: National Building Register:62449: (B)				
Harris Court Mil1		Horton (Bradford), SE 1420 3140 53°46′43″N 1°47′10″W			
	Notes: National Building Register:62453: (B)				
Haycliffe Hill Mill		Horton (Bradford), SE 1438 3091 53°46′28″N 1°47′00″W			
	Notes: National Building Register:62455: (B)				
Haycliffe Shed		Horton (Bradford), SE 1455 3105 53°46′32″N 1°46′51″W			
	Notes: National Building Register:62454: (B)				
Holme Top Mills		Horton (Bradford), SE 1568 3165 53°46′51″N 1°45′49″W			
	Notes: National Building Register:62500: (C)				
Jesse Street Dyeworks		Horton (Bradford), SE 1630 3210 53°47′06″N 1°45′15″W			
	Notes: National Building Register:62620*: (A)				
Kelwood Mill		Horton (Bradford),			
	Notes: (see Grange Shed)				
Lane Close Mills		Horton (Bradford), SE 1395 3138 53°46′43″N 1°47′23″W			
	Notes: National Building Register:62427: (B)				
Legrams Mill		Horton (Bradford), SE 1495 3285 53°47′30″N 1°46′28″W			
	Notes: National Building Register:62447*: (A)				
Manchester Road Mill		Horton (Bradford),			
	Notes: (see Bowling Mill)				
Marshall's Mill		Horton (Bradford), SE 163 326 53°47′22″N 1°45′15″W			
	Notes: National Building Register:521:) 6				
Mill		Horton (Bradford), SE 1539 3120 53°46′37″N 1°46′05″W			
	Notes: National Building Register:62503: (B)				
Mill		Horton (Bradford), SE 1476 3279 53°47′28″N 1°46′39″W			
	Notes: National Building Register:62607: (B)				
Mill		Horton (Bradford), SE 1549 3299 53°47′35″N 1°45′59″W			
	Notes: National Building Register:62616: (B)				
New Mill		Horton (Bradford),			
	Notes: (see Beckside Mills)				
Paddock Dyeworks		Horton (Bradford), SE 1274 3165 53°46′52″N 1°48′29″W			
	Notes: National Building Register:62413: (B)				
Pakington Street Shed		Horton (Bradford), SE 1594 3183 53°46′57″N 1°45′34″W			
	Notes: National Building Register:62499: (B)				
Phoenix Mil1		Horton (Bradford), SE 1530 3274 53°47′27″N 1°46′09″W			
	Notes: National Building Register:62497: (B)				
Phoenix Works		Horton (Bradford), SE 1570 3300 53°47′35″N 1°45′47″W			
	Notes: National Building Register:62490: (B)				
Richmond Mills		Horton (Bradford), SE 1542 3310 53°47′38″N 1°46′03″W			
	Notes: National Building Register:62486: (B)				
St Andrew's Mills		Horton (Bradford), SE 1472 3285 53°47′30″N 1°46′41″W			
	Notes: National Building Register:62446: (B)				
St Stephen's Shed		Horton (Bradford), SE 1600 3165 53°46′51″N 1°45′31″W			
	Notes: National Building Register:62535: (B)				
Shearbridge Mills		Horton (Bradford), SE 1525 3245 53°47′17″N 1°46′12″W			
	Notes: National Building Register:62498: (B)				
Star Mills		Horton (Bradford),			
	Notes: (see Beehive Mills)				
West Brook Mills		Horton (Bradford),			
	Notes: (see Phoenix Mill)				
West End Mills		Horton (Bradford), SE 1553 3299 53°47′35″N 1°45′57″W			
	Notes: National Building Register:62609: (C)				
Westcroft Mill		Horton (Bradford), SE 1410 3165 53°46′51″N 1°47′15″W			
	Notes: National Building Register:62618: (B)				
Westfield Mill		Horton (Bradford), SE 1450 3286 53°47′31″N 1°46′53″W			
	Notes: National Building Register:62445: (B)				

== Manningham (Bradford) ==
Name	Architect	Location	Built	Demolished	Served (Years)
Alston Works		Manningham (Bradford), SE 1445 3315 53°47′40″N 1°46′56″W			
	Notes: National Building Register:62443: (C)				
Brick Lane Mill		Manningham (Bradford), SE 1505 3365 53°47′56″N 1°46′23″W			
	Notes: National Building Register:62480: (B)				
Brown Royd Dyeworks		Manningham (Bradford), SE 1460 3355 53°47′53″N 1°46′47″W			
	Notes: National Building Register:62441: (B)				
Bullroyd Mill		Manningham (Bradford), SE 1345 3371 53°47′58″N 1°47′50″W			
	Notes: National Building Register:62417: (B)				
Cumberland Works		Manningham (Bradford), SE 1375 3330 53°47′45″N 1°47′34″W			
	Notes: National Building Register:62422*: (A)				
Globe Mills		Manningham (Bradford), SE 1520 3375 53°47′59″N 1°46′15″W			
	Notes: National Building Register:62478: (B)				
Lily Croft Mill		Manningham (Bradford),			
	Notes: (see Manningham Mills)				
Low Globe Mill		Manningham (Bradford),			
	Notes: (see Globe Mills)				
Low Royd Dyeworks		Manningham (Bradford), SE 1459 3343 53°47′49″N 1°46′48″W			
	Notes: National Building Register:62442: (B)				
Lumb Lane Mills; Drummond's Mill	Lockwood & Mawson	Manningham (Bradford), SE 1565 3385 53°48′03″N 1°45′50″W	1885	2016	117
	Notes: National Building Register:62477: (B)				
Manningham Dyeworks		Manningham (Bradford), SE 1515 3445 53°48′22″N 1°46′17″W			
	Notes: National Building Register:62476: (B)				
Manningham Mills		Manningham (Bradford), SE 1450 3490 53°48′37″N 1°46′53″W			
	Notes: National Building Register:62439*: (A)				
Oakwood Dyeworks		Manningham (Bradford), SE 1515 3365 53°47′56″N 1°46′17″W			
	Notes: National Building Register:62479: (B)				
Parkinsons Buildings		Manningham (Bradford), SE 1520 3355 53°47′53″N 1°46′15″W			
	Notes: National Building Register:62481: (B)				
Try Mills		Manningham (Bradford), SE 1524 3341 53°47′48″N 1°46′12″W			
	Notes: National Building Register:62482*: (A)				
Valley Dyeworks		Manningham (Bradford), SE 1620 3430 53°48′17″N 1°45′20″W			
	Notes: National Building Register:62515: (B)				
Valley Mills		Manningham (Bradford), SE 1605 3465 53°48′28″N 1°45′28″W			
	Notes: National Building Register:62513: (B)				
Whetley Mills		Manningham (Bradford), SE 1475 3365 53°47′56″N 1°46′39″W			
	Notes: National Building Register:62440*: (A)				
Whitehead'sMi1l		Manningham (Bradford), SE 1399 3360 53°47′55″N 1°47′21″W			
	Notes: National Building Register:62424: (B)				
Young Street Mills		Manningham (Bradford), SE 1395 3360 53°47′55″N 1°47′23″W			
	Notes: National Building Register:62423*: (A)				
Young Street Sheds		Manningham (Bradford),			
	Notes: (see Whitehead's Mill)				

== See also ==
- Heavy Woollen District
- Textile processing
