= List of mills in Saddleworth =

This list of mills in Saddleworth, lists textile factories that have existed in Saddleworth, Greater Manchester, England.

Saddleworth is a civil parish of the Metropolitan Borough of Oldham in Greater Manchester, England. It comprises several villages and hamlets amongst the west side of the Pennine hills: Uppermill, Greenfield, Dobcross, Delph, Diggle and others. Saddleworth lies to the east of the large town of Oldham.

Historically a part of the West Riding of Yorkshire, for centuries Saddleworth was a centre of woollen cloth production in the domestic system. For centuries Saddleworth was linked, ecclesiastically, with the parish of Rochdale though a civil parish in the West Riding of Yorkshire, so was long talked of as the part of Yorkshire where Lancastrians lived. Even then it had an Oldham postal address. Following the Industrial Revolution, Saddleworth became a centre for cotton spinning and weaving.

The former Saddleworth Urban District was the only part of the West Riding to have been amalgamated into Greater Manchester in 1974.

Name	Architect	Location	Built	Demolished	Served (Years)
Albion		Smithy Lane, Uppermill 53°32′55″N 2°00′14″W	c.1854	Standing	
	Notes: Converted to apartments.				
Alexandra		Uppermill 53°32′47″N 2°00′22″W		Standing	
	Notes: Alexandra Mill Uppermill was built in 1860 by flannel manufacturers J.Bradbury & Co. This four-storey stone built mill has had many uses over the years. In the mid 1980s it was a craft centre which was divided into small units. Today the mill on the banks of the River Tame has been converted into stylish living apartments. For reference, a 2-bedroom fourth floor flat was on the market for £199,950 in March 2009.				
Bailey		Delph New Road, Delph 53°33′40″N 2°01′24″W		2016	
	Notes: Bailey Mill closed down in 1996. Since that time it has remained empty and its future is uncertain. The old Delph branch line (locally known as The Delph Donkey) once ran along the front of the mill in the picture with the last passenger train running on Saturday 30 April 1955. The old track bed is now a popular recreational route to Dobcross and Uppermill. Although the railway infrastructure has mostly been removed, the architecture of the bridges, walls and buttresses remains. Gutted by fire and collapsed on 14 June 2016.				
Bentfield		Chew Valley Road, Greenfield 53°32′03″N 2°00′19″W	1868	1979	111
	Notes: Built originally at as a wollen mill circa 1790 but rebuilt as a Cotton Mill by Robinson Brothers in 1868. It reverted to wool in 1892. Chew Brook Drive and its housing is built on the site.				
Brookside		Grotton Hollow, Grotton 53°32′20″N 2°03′14″W	1855	1970	73
	Notes: After being partly demolished in 1930 it became apparent there was a market for a heated swimming pool after locals kept using the mill lodge for bathing. This ceased after the outbreak of World War II. The buildings were converted for warehouse before being fully demolished for housing.				
Brownhill Bridge		Dobcross New Road		Standing	
	1309426Notes: A three storey, four bay water-powered woollen scribbling mill from 1772				
Damhead		Uppermill			
	Notes: see Willow Bank Mill				
Lumb Mill		Huddersfield Road, Delph			
	Notes: Built as a woolen mill, later used as a calico printworks. During WWII became an Admiralty Victualling Stores. Purchased by Compoflex in the mid 1960s, a manufacturer of flexible hoses for the chemical industry.				
Oak View		Manchester Road, Greenfield 53°31′59″N 2°00′32″W		Standing	
	Notes:				
Shore		Delph 53°34′05″N 2°01′21″W	1780s	Standing	
	1067445Notes: Stone built water- powered woollen scribbling mill of 1788 beside the River Tame. Converted to residential use. Wheel and leat still survive.				
Victoria		Uppermill 53°32′47″N 2°00′29″W		Demolished	
	Notes: Now houses the Saddleworth Museum and Art Gallery in the remaining outbuilding.				
Willow Bank		Station Road, Uppermill, 53°32′55″N 2°00′14″W		Standing	
