= List of mills in Holmfirth =

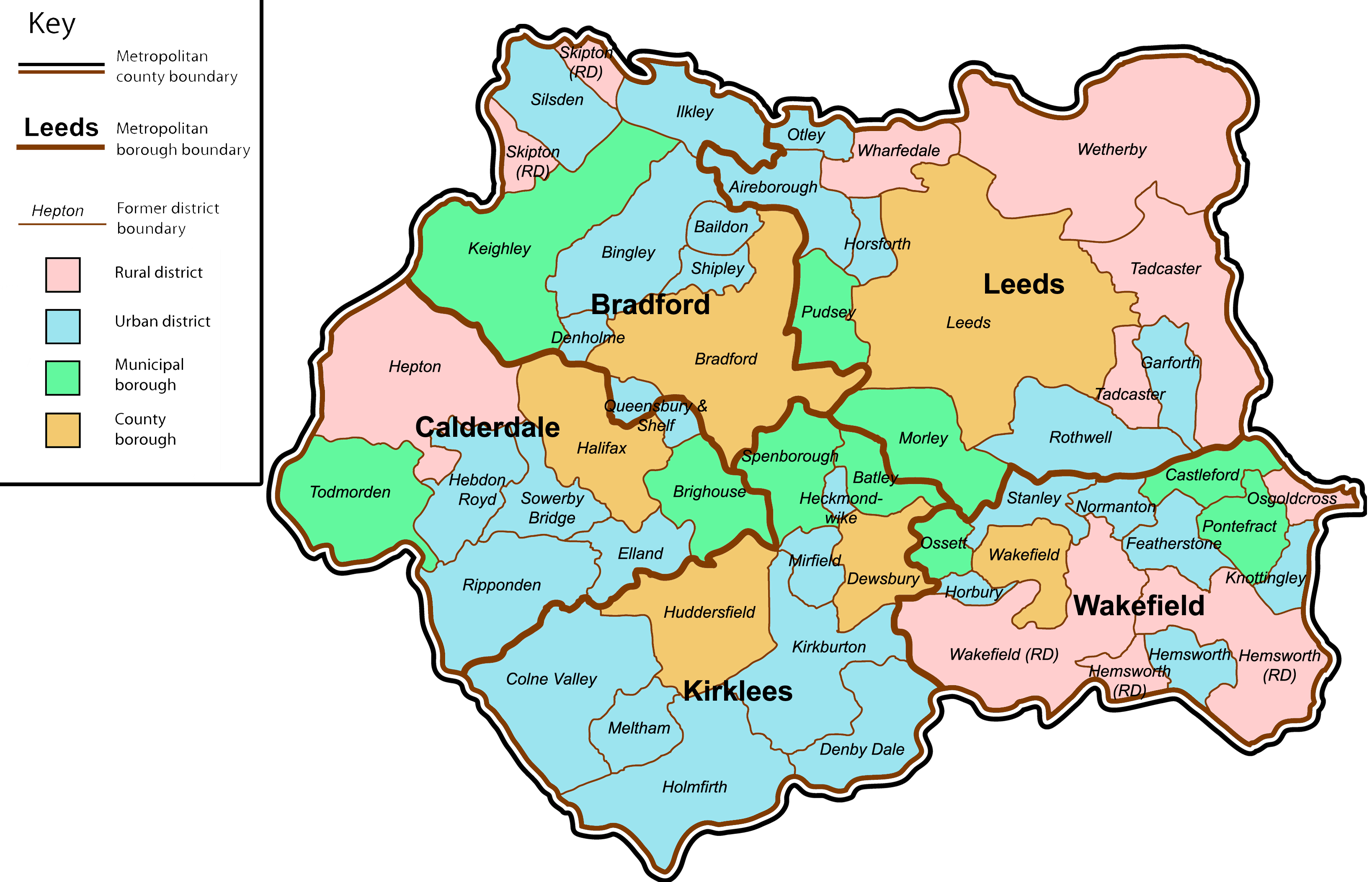

This is a list of the wool, cotton and other textile mills in Holmfirth, Kirklees, West Yorkshire.

== Austonley Holmfirth ==
Name	Architect	Location	Built	Demolished	Served (Years)
Austonley Mill		Austonley Holmfirth, SE 1165 0685 53°33′29″N 1°49′32″W			
	Notes: National Building Register:63227: (C)				
Bank End Mill		Austonley Holmfirth,			
	Notes: (see Austonley Mill)				
Battye Lower Mill		Austonley Holmfirth, SE 1156 0683 53°33′29″N 1°49′37″W			
	Notes: National Building Register:63231: (C)				
Bilberry Mill		Austonley Holmfirth, SE 104 070 53°33′34″N 1°50′40″W			
	Notes: National Building Register:229: (C)				
BlackSike Mill		Austonley Holmfirth, SE 122 080 53°34′06″N 1°49′02″W			
	Notes: National Building Register:230: (C)				
Bottoms Mill		Austonley Holmfirth, SE 1315 0745 53°33′49″N 1°48′11″W			
	Notes: National Building Register:63200: (B)				
DigleyMills		Austonley Holmfirth, SE 1141 0688 53°33′30″N 1°49′45″W			
	Notes: National Building Register:63233: (C)				
Hinchliffe Mill		Austonley Holmfirth, SE 1275 0709 53°33′37″N 1°48′32″W			
	Notes: National Building Register:63193: (B)				
Holmbridge Dyeworks		Austonley Holmfirth, SE 1272 0669 53°33′24″N 1°48′34″W			
	Notes: National Building Register:63238: (C)				
Holmbridge Mill		Austonley Holmfirth, SE 120 066 53°33′21″N 1°49′13″W			
	Notes: National Building Register:194: (C)				
Low Brow Bottoms Mill		Austonley Holmfirth,			
	Notes: (see Battye Lower Mill)				
Upper Digley Mill		Austonley Holmfirth, SE 109 070 53°33′34″N 1°50′13″W			
	Notes: National Building Register:234: (C)				
Yew Tree Mills		Austonley Holmfirth, SE 1255 0714 53°33′39″N 1°48′43″W			
	Notes: National Building Register:63192: (B)				

== Cartworth Holmfirth ==
Name	Architect	Location	Built	Demolished	Served (Years)
Dob Mill		Cartworth Holmfirth, SE 1240 0669 53°33′24″N 1°48′51″W			
	Notes: National Building Register:63226: (B)				
DoverMill		Cartworth Holmfirth, SE 1450 0699 53°33′34″N 1°46′57″W			
	Notes: National Building Register:63209: (B)				
Green Lane Mill		Cartworth Holmfirth, SE 1443 0682 53°33′28″N 1°47′01″W			
	Notes: National Building Register:63210: (B)				
Hinchliffe Mill		Cartworth Holmfirth, SE 1275 0709 53°33′37″N 1°48′32″W			
	Notes: National Building Register:63193: (B)				
Holmbridge Mill		Cartworth Holmfirth, SE 120 066 53°33′21″N 1°49′13″W			
	Notes: National Building Register:63194: (C)				
Jane Wood Dyehouse		Cartworth Holmfirth, SE 144 071 53°33′37″N 1°47′03″W			
	Notes: National Building Register:63235: (C)				
LowerMills		Cartworth Holmfirth, SE 1393 0800 53°34′06″N 1°47′28″W			
	Notes: National Building Register:63195: (B)				
Perseverance Mills		Cartworth Holmfirth, SE 1358 0775 53°33′58″N 1°47′47″W			
	Notes: National Building Register:63197: (C)				
Ribbleden Mill		Cartworth Holmfirth, SE 1428 0810 53°34′09″N 1°47′09″W			
	Notes: National Building Register:63206: (B)				
Swan Bank Mill		Cartworth Holmfirth, SE 1450 0775 53°33′58″N 1°46′57″W			
	Notes: National Building Register:63207: (B)				
Washpit Mill		Cartworth Holmfirth, SE 1425 0670 53°33′24″N 1°47′11″W			
	Notes: National Building Register:63211: (A)				

== Fulstone Holmfirth ==
Name	Architect	Location	Built	Demolished	Served (Years)
Holme Bottom Mill		Fulstone Holmfirth, SE 1620 0910 53°34′42″N 1°45′24″W			
	Notes: National Building Register:63215: (C)				
Moorbrook Mills		Fulstone Holmfirth, SE 1619 0880 53°34′32″N 1°45′25″W			
	Notes: National Building Register:63216: (B)				
Sude Hill Mills		Fulstone Holmfirth, SE 1673 0863 53°34′26″N 1°44′56″W			
	Notes: National Building Register:63218: (A)				

== Hepworth Holmfirth ==
Name	Architect	Location	Built	Demolished	Served (Years)
Dobroyd Mill		Hepworth Holmfirth, SE 1639 0720 53°33′40″N 1°45′15″W			
	Notes: National Building Register:63222: (B)				
Hepworth Mill		Hepworth Holmfirth, SE 1649 0650 53°33′17″N 1°45′09″W			
	Notes: National Building Register:63223: (C)				

== Holme Holmfirth ==
Name	Architect	Location	Built	Demolished	Served (Years)
Brownhill Mills		Holme Holmfirth, SE 114 061 53°33′05″N 1°49′46″W			
	Notes: National Building Register:232: (C)				
RakeMi11		Holme Holmfirth, SE 1059 0555 53°32′47″N 1°50′30″W			
	Notes: National Building Register:63228: (C)				

== Honley Holmfirth ==
Name	Architect	Location	Built	Demolished	Served (Years)
Bridge Dyeworks		Honley Holmfirth, SE 1415 1198 53°36′15″N 1°47′16″W			
	Notes: National Building Register:63115: (B)				
CockingStepsMill		Honley Holmfirth, SE 1255 1235 53°36′27″N 1°48′42″W			
	Notes: National Building Register:63062: (B)				
Crossley Mills		Honley Holmfirth, SE 1435 1180 53°36′09″N 1°47′05″W			
	Notes: National Building Register:63116: (B)				
Dean House Mills		Honley Holmfirth, SE 1400 0995 53°35′09″N 1°47′24″W			
	Notes: National Building Register:63201: (B)				
Grove Mills		Honley Holmfirth, SE 1443 1210 53°36′19″N 1°47′00″W			
	Notes: National Building Register:63114: (B)				
Honley Mill		Honley Holmfirth, SE 1408 1108 53°35′46″N 1°47′19″W			
	Notes: National Building Register:63155: (B)				
Lord’s Mill		Honley Holmfirth, SE 1292 1218 53°36′22″N 1°48′22″W			
	Notes: National Building Register:63063: (B)				
Lower Mytholm Bridge Mil1s		Honley Holmfirth, SE 1525 1045 53°35′25″N 1°46′16″W			
	Notes: National Building Register:63128: (C)				
Moll Springs Dyeworks		Honley Holmfirth, SE 1306 1209 53°36′19″N 1°48′15″W			
	Notes: National Building Register:63078: (B)				
Neiley Mills		Honley Holmfirth,			
	Notes: (see Crossley Mills)				
Queen’s Mil1		Honley Holmfirth, SE 1352 1155 53°36′01″N 1°47′50″W			
	Notes: National Building Register:63154: (B)				
Reins Mil1		Honley Holmfirth, SE 1402 1241 53°36′29″N 1°47′22″W			
	Notes: National Building Register:63113: (B)				
Smithy Place Mi11s		Honley Holmfirth, SE 1502 1109 53°35′46″N 1°46′28″W			
	Notes: National Building Register:3127: (B)				
Thirstin Dyeworks		Honley Holmfirth, SE 1355 1232 53°36′26″N 1°47′48″W			
	Notes: National Building Register:63077: (B)				
Thirstin Mills		Honley Holmfirth, SE 1345 1210 53°36′19″N 1°47′54″W			
	Notes: National Building Register:63079: (B)				
Victoria Mill		Honley Holmfirth,			
	Notes: (see Queen’s Mill)				

== Netherthong Holmfirth ==
Name	Architect	Location	Built	Demolished	Served (Years)
Alma Mill		Netherthong Holmfirth, SE 1475 0983 53°35′05″N 1°46′43″W			
	Notes: National Building Register:63236: (C)				
Thongsbridge Mills		Netherthong Holmfirth, SE 1479 0970 53°35′01″N 1°46′41″W			
	Notes: National Building Register:63202: (B)				

== Thurstonland Holmfirth ==
Name	Architect	Location	Built	Demolished	Served (Years)
Rock Mills		Thurstonland Holmfirth, SE 151 108 53°35′37″N 1°46′24″W			
	Notes: National Building Register:181: (C)				

== Upperthong Holmfirth ==
Name	Architect	Location	Built	Demolished	Served (Years)
AlbertMills		Upperthong Holmfirth, SE 1438 0849 53°34′22″N 1°47′04″W			
	Notes: National Building Register:63205: (B)				
Bridge Mill		Upperthong Holmfirth, SE 1430 0880 53°34′32″N 1°47′08″W			
	Notes: National Building Register:63204: (B)				
Prickleden Mills		Upperthong Holmfirth, SE 1382 0795 53°34′05″N 1°47′34″W			
	Notes: National Building Register:63196: (B)				
Riverholme Works		Upperthong Holmfirth,			
	Notes: (see Bridge Mill)				
Spring Lane Mill		Upperthong Holmfirth, SE 1321 0774 53°33′58″N 1°48′07″W			
	Notes: National Building Register:63198: (B)				
Upper Mill		Upperthong Holmfirth,			
	Notes: (see Prickleden Mills)				
VictoriaMil1		Upperthong Holmfirth, SE 1343 0776 53°33′59″N 1°47′55″W			
	Notes: National Building Register:63199: (B)				

== Wooldale Holmfirth ==
Name	Architect	Location	Built	Demolished	Served (Years)
Albion Mill		Wooldale Holmfirth, SE 1485 0973 53°35′02″N 1°46′38″W			
	Notes: National Building Register:63203 : (B)				
Choppards Mill		Wooldale Holmfirth, SE 141 064 53°33′14″N 1°47′19″W			
	Notes: National Building Register:225 : (C)				
Ford Mill		Wooldale Holmfirth, SE 1555 0845 53°34′21″N 1°46′00″W			
	Notes: National Building Register:63214 : (B)				
Glendale Mills		Wooldale Holmfirth, SE 1628 0866 53°34′27″N 1°45′20″W			
	Notes: National Building Register:63217 : (B)				
Ing Nook Mi1ls		Wooldale Holmfirth,			
	Notes: (seeGlenda1e Mills)				
Kirkbridge Mill		Wooldale Holmfirth, SE 1589 0929 53°34′48″N 1°45′41″W			
	Notes: National Building Register:63213 : (C)				
Lee Mills		Wooldale Holmfirth, SE 1600 0755 53°33′52″N 1°45′36″W			
	Notes: National Building Register:63221 : (B)				
Midge on Wood Bottom Mill		Wooldale Holmfirth, SE 1628 0777 53°33′59″N 1°45′20″W			
	Notes: National Building Register:63220: (B)				
Moorbrook Mills		Wooldale Holmfirth, SE 1619 0880 53°34′32″N 1°45′25″W			
	Notes: National Building Register:63216: (B)				
Scholes Mill		Wooldale Holmfirth,			
	Notes: (see Midge on Wood Bottom Mill)				
Stoney Bank Mill		Wooldale Holmfirth, SE 1569 0988 53°35′07″N 1°45′52″W			
	Notes: National Building Register:63212: (A)				
Town Mill		Wooldale Holmfirth, SE 1429 0829 53°34′16″N 1°47′08″W			
	Notes: National Building Register:63237: (C)				
Underbank Mill		Wooldale Holmfirth, SE 1463 0742 53°33′47″N 1°46′50″W			
	Notes: National Building Register:63208: (A)				
Upper Mytholm Bridge Mills		Wooldale Holmfirth, SE 1529 1019 53°35′17″N 1°46′14″W			
	Notes: National Building Register:63129: (B)				
Washpit Mill		Wooldale Holmfirth, SE 1425 0670 53°33′24″N 1°47′11″W			
	Notes: National Building Register:63211: (A)				
Wildspur Mill		Wooldale Holmfirth, SE 1680 0815 53°34′11″N 1°44′52″W			
	Notes: National Building Register:63219: (B)				

== See also ==
- Heavy Woollen District
- Textile processing
