= List of mills in Kirklees =

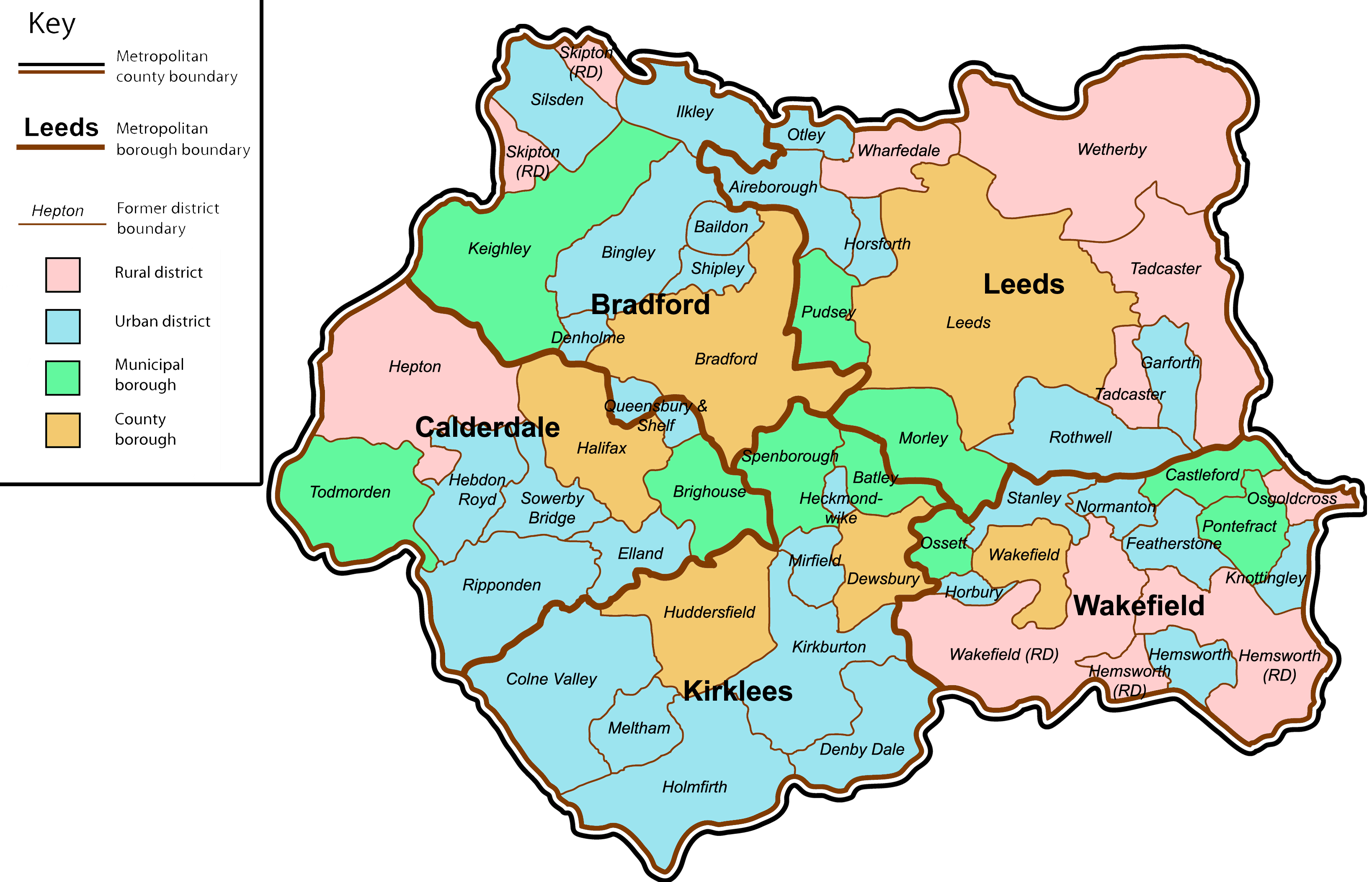
Kirklees in West Yorkshire, England

This is a list of the wool, cotton and other textile mills in Kirklees: Including the towns of Dewsbury, Huddersfield with Batley, Spenborough, Heckmondwike and Holmfirth.

== Batley ==
Name	Architect	Location	Built	Demolished	Served (Years)
Albert Mills		Batley, SE 2442 2274 53°42′02″N 1°37′54″W			
	Notes: National Building Register:63532: (B)				
Albion Mill		Batley, SE 2449 2277 53°42′03″N 1°37′50″W			
	Notes: National Building Register:63535: (A)				
Blakeridge Mills		Batley, SE 2389 2440 53°42′56″N 1°38′22″W	1913		112
	Notes: National Building Register:63485: J.T. and J Taylor, Woollen Manufacturers; Converted to residential(A)				
Bottoms Mill (part)		Batley, SE 2475 2374 53°42′34″N 1°37′35″W			
	Notes: National Building Register:63520: (C)				
Bottoms Mill		Batley, SE 2475 2384 53°42′37″N 1°37′35″W			
	Notes: National Building Register:63519: (B)				
Bradford Road,203		Batley, SE 244 227 53°42′01″N 1°37′55″W			
	Notes: National Building Register:681: (B)				
Bradford Road,209		Batley, SE 244 228 53°42′04″N 1°37′55″W			
	Notes: National Building Register:682: (B)				
Branch Road Mills		Batley, SE 2425 2445 53°42′57″N 1°38′03″W			
	Notes: National Building Register:63668: (C)				
Brights Mill		Batley, SE 2469 2340 53°42′23″N 1°37′39″W			
	Notes: National Building Register:63524: (B)				
Brookroyd Mill		Batley, SE 2299 2560 53°43′35″N 1°39′11″W			
	Notes: National Building Register:63459: (B)				
Bullrush Mills		Batley, SE 2355 2512 53°43′19″N 1°38′41″W			
	Notes: National Building Register:63481: (B)				
Carlinghow Mill (Park Works)		Batley, SE 2348 2525 53°43′23″N 1°38′44″W			
	Notes: National Building Register:63480: Grade II listed building(B)				
Carlinghow Mills		Batley, SE 238 247 53°43′05″N 1°38′27″W			
	Notes: National Building Register:484: (B)				
Carr Bridge Mills		Batley, SE 2455 2283 53°42′05″N 1°37′47″W			
	Notes: National Building Register:63530: (B)				
Carr Dyke Mill		Batley, SE 2441 2272 53°42′01″N 1°37′54″W			
	Notes: National Building Register:63533: (B)				
Carr Top Mills		Batley, SE 2376 2286 53°42′06″N 1°38′30″W			
	Notes: National Building Register:63492: (C)				
Cheapside Mills		Batley, SE 2485 2410 53°42′46″N 1°37′30″W			
	Notes: National Building Register:63513: (A)				
Clerk Green Mill		Batley, SE 2392 2395 53°42′41″N 1°38′21″W			
	Notes: National Building Register:63488: (B)				
Clothing Factory		Batley, SE 2475 2391 53°42′40″N 1°37′35″W			
	Notes: National Building Register:63643: (B)				
Commercial Mill		Batley, SE 2455 2417 53°42′48″N 1°37′46″W			
	Notes: National Building Register:63512: (C)				
Dock Ing Mill		Bradford Rd, Batley, SE 2360 2495 53°43′13″N 1°38′38″W			
	Notes: National Building Register:63482: (B)				
Fountain Mill		Batley, SE 2383 2477 53°43′08″N 1°38′25″W			
	Notes: National Building Register:63645: (B)				
Healey Lane Mill		Batley, SE 2329 2405 53°42′44″N 1°38′55″W			
	Notes: National Building Register:63487: (B)				
Hick Lane Mills		Batley, SE 246 240 53°42′43″N 1°37′44″W			
	Notes: National Building Register:662: (B)				
Hick Well Mill		Batley, SE 2460 2396 53°42′41″N 1°37′44″W			
	Notes: National Building Register:63515: (B)				
Highfield Mills		Batley, SE 2275 2340 53°42′23″N 1°39′25″W			
	Notes: National Building Register:63465: (B)				
Ings Mill		Batley, SE 2458 2298 53°42′10″N 1°37′45″W			
	Notes: National Building Register:63527: (B)				
Little Orm Mill		Batley, SE 2392 2410 53°42′46″N 1°38′21″W			
	Notes: National Building Register:63486: (B)				
Livingstone Mills		Batley, SE 2449 2313 53°42′14″N 1°37′50″W			
	Notes: National Building Register:63525: (B)				
Mill		Batley, SE 2455 2390 53°42′39″N 1°37′46″W			
	Notes: National Building Register:63647: (B)				
Mill		Batley, SE 2285 2559 53°43′34″N 1°39′19″W			
	Notes: National Building Register:63650: (B)				
New Ing Mills		Batley, SE 2441 2390 53°42′39″N 1°37′54″W			
	Notes: National Building Register:63516: (A)				
Old Mill		Batley, SE 244 242 53°42′49″N 1°37′54″W			
	Notes: National Building Register:661: (B)				
Park Mills		Batley, SE 2402 2460 53°43′02″N 1°38′15″W			
	Notes: National Building Register:63509: (C)				
Park Works		Batley,			
	Notes: (see Carlinghow Mill)				
Perseverance Mill		Batley, SE 2449 2431 53°42′53″N 1°37′49″W			
	Notes: National Building Register:63511: (C)				
Perseverance Mill		Batley, SE 2440 2285 53°42′05″N 1°37′55″W			
	Notes: National Building Register:63671: (B)				
Prospect Mill		Batley, SE 2401 2468 53°43′05″N 1°38′16″W			
	Notes: National Building Register:63508: (B)				
Providence Mill		Batley, SE 2248 2566 53°43′36″N 1°39′33″W			
	Notes: National Building Register:63457: (B)				
Providence Mill		Batley, SE 2412 2457 53°43′01″N 1°38′10″W			
	Notes: National Building Register:63510: (C)				
Providence Street Mills		Batley, SE 2418 2410 53°42′46″N 1°38′06″W			
	Notes: National Building Register:63666: (C)				
Providence Works		Batley, SE 2461 2421 53°42′49″N 1°37′43″W			
	Notes: National Building Register:63667: (C)				
Purlwell Mills		Batley, SE 2419 2378 53°42′36″N 1°38′06″W			
	Notes: National Building Register:63518: (B)				
Ridings Mill		Batley, SE 2231 2479 53°43′09″N 1°39′48″W			
	Notes: National Building Register:63460: (B)				
Spa Field Mills		Batley, SE 2391 2286 53°42′06″N 1°38′22″W			
	Notes: National Building Register:63493: (B)				
Spring Mill		Batley, SE 2314 2319 53°42′17″N 1°39′03″W			
	Notes: National Building Register:63490: (B)				
Spring Mill		Batley, SE 231 248 53°43′09″N 1°39′05″W			
	Notes: National Building Register:870: (B)				
Springwell Mills		Batley, SE 2449 2295 53°42′09″N 1°37′50″W			
	Notes: National Building Register:63528: (B)				
Staincliffe Low Mills		Batley, SE 2331 2300 53°42′10″N 1°38′54″W			
	Notes: National Building Register:63491: (B)				
Staincliffe Mills		Batley, SE 2303 2327 53°42′19″N 1°39′09″W			
	Notes: National Building Register:63489: (B)				
Station Road, 10–14		Batley, SE 248 238 53°42′36″N 1°37′33″W			
	Notes: National Building Register:708: (B)				
Valley Mills		Batley, SE 2439 2398 53°42′42″N 1°37′55″W			
	Notes: National Building Register:63517 : (B)				
Victoria Mill		Batley, SE 2375 2478 53°43′08″N 1°38′30″W			
	Notes: National Building Register:63483: (A)				
Victoria Mills		Batley, SE 2455 2287 53°42′06″N 1°37′47″W			
	Notes: National Building Register:63529: (B)				
Warehouse, Carr Street		Batley, SE 244 228 53°42′04″N 1°37′55″W			
	Notes: National Building Register:683: (B)				
Warehouse, Station Road		Batley, SE 2477 2329 53°42′20″N 1°37′35″W			
	Notes: National Building Register:63707: (B)				
Warehouse, Station Road		Batley, SE 2473 2392 53°42′40″N 1°37′37″W			
	Notes: National Building Register:63706: (B)				
Warwick Road Mills		Batley, SE 2445 2303 53°42′11″N 1°37′52″W			
	Notes: National Building Register:63526: (B)				
Wensleydale Mills		Batley, SE 2272 2565 53°43′36″N 1°39′26″W			
	Notes: National Building Register:63458: (B)				
Wheatcroft Mills		Batley, SE 2440 2280 53°42′04″N 1°37′55″W			
	Notes: National Building Register:63531: (B)				
Wilton Mills		Batley, SE 2375 2489 53°43′12″N 1°38′30″W			
	Notes: National Building Register:63646: (B)				
Warehouse, Firths Yard		Batley, SE 24 22 53°41′38″N 1°38′17″W			
	Notes: National Building Register:4: 636				

== Denby (Denby Dale) ==
Name	Architect	Location	Built	Demolished	Served (Years)
Birds Edge Mill		Denby (Denby Dale), SE 2021 0792 53°34′03″N 1°41′47″W	early/mid 19th century		
	Notes: National Building Register:63776: Grade II listed building (B)				
Cuttlehurst Mill		Denby (Denby Dale), SE 2465 0994 53°35′08″N 1°37′45″W			
	Notes: National Building Register:63782: (B)				
Dearnside Mill		Denby (Denby Dale), SE 2279 0833 53°34′16″N 1°39′26″W			
	Notes: National Building Register:63779: (B)				
Hartcliffe Mills		Denby (Denby Dale), SE 2230 0830 53°34′15″N 1°39′53″W			
	Notes: National Building Register:63777: (B)				
Inkerman Mill		Denby (Denby Dale), SE 2310 0807 53°34′07″N 1°39′10″W			
	Notes: National Building Register:63781: (C)				
Lower Putting Mill		Denby (Denby Dale), SE 2391 0923 53°34′45″N 1°38′25″W			
	Notes: National Building Register:63780: (C)				
Pudding Mill		Denby (Denby Dale),			
	Notes: (see Lower Putting Mill)				
Springfield Mill		Denby (Denby Dale), SE 2282 0842 53°34′19″N 1°39′25″W			
	Notes: National Building Register:63778: (B)				

== Gomersal (Batley; Gomersal) ==
Name	Architect	Location	Built	Demolished	Served (Years)
Brier Mill(B)		Gomersal (Batley; Gomersal), SE 2218 2598 53°43′47″N 1°39′55″W			
	Notes: National Building Register:53454: (C)				
Britannia Mills(G)		Gomersal (Batley; Gomersal), SE 2277 2655 53°44′05″N 1°39′23″W			
	Notes: National Building Register:53455: (B)				
Carr Mill(B)		Gomersal (Batley; Gomersal), SE 2225 2502 53°43′16″N 1°39′51″W			
	Notes: National Building Register:53453: (B)				
Cloth Hall Mill (G)		Gomersal (Batley; Gomersal), SE 204 250 53°43′16″N 1°41′32″W			
	Notes: National Building Register:424:) 5				
Clough Mill (G)		Gomersal (Batley; Gomersal), SE 2050 2722 53°44′27″N 1°41′26″W			
	Notes: National Building Register:63423: (B)				
College Mill (B)		Gomersal (Batley; Gomersal), SE 2215 2605 53°43′49″N 1°39′57″W			
	Notes: National Building Register:63452: (B)				
Dyeworks(G)		Gomersal (Batley; Gomersal), SE 2191 2624 53°43′55″N 1°40′10″W			
	Notes: National Building Register:63435: (B)				
Flock House(B)		Gomersal (Batley; Gomersal), SE 2218 2613 53°43′52″N 1°39′55″W			
	Notes: National Building Register:63451: (B)				
Gomersal Mill		Gomersal (Batley; Gomersal),			
	Notes: (see Cloth Hall Mill)				
Grove Mills (B)		Gomersal (Batley; Gomersal), SE 2240 2590 53°43′44″N 1°39′43″W			
	Notes: National Building Register:63455: (B)				
Howden Clough Mill (B)		Gomersal (Batley; Gomersal), SE 2406 2708 53°44′22″N 1°38′12″W			
	Notes: National Building Register:63506: (B)				
Mill (G)		Gomersal (Batley; Gomersal), SE 1956 2530 53°43′25″N 1°42′18″W			
	Notes: National Building Register:62922: (B)				
Nellroyd Mills(G)		Gomersal (Batley; Gomersal), SE 1965 2490 53°43′12″N 1°42′13″W			
	Notes: National Building Register:62901: (B)				
Popeley Mills (G)		Gomersal (Batley; Gomersal), SE 2140 2580 53°43′41″N 1°40′38″W			
	Notes: National Building Register:63653: (B)				
Providence Mills (G)		Gomersal (Batley; Gomersal), SE 1955 2505 53°43′17″N 1°42′19″W			
	Notes: National Building Register:62898: (B)				
Quarry Mill (C)		Gomersal (Batley; Gomersal), SE 2095 2520 53°43′22″N 1°41′02″W			
	Notes: National Building Register:63425: (B)				
Round Hill Mill (G)		Gomersal (Batley; Gomersal), SE 1967 2605 53°43′50″N 1°42′12″W			
	Notes: National Building Register:62892: (B)				
Smithies Mill(B)		Gomersal (Batley; Gomersal), SE 2252 2577 53°43′40″N 1°39′37″W			
	Notes: National Building Register:63456: (B)				
Spen Mills (G)		Gomersal (Batley; Gomersal), SE 1955 2534 53°43′27″N 1°42′19″W			
	Notes: National Building Register:62896: (B)				
Union Mills (G)		Gomersal (Batley; Gomersal), SE 2105 2515 53°43′20″N 1°40′57″W			
	Notes: National Building Register:63436: (B)				

== Heckmondwike ==
Name	Architect	Location	Built	Demolished	Served (Years)
Beehive Mills		Heckmondwike, SE 2150 2281 53°42′05″N 1°40′33″W			
	Notes: National Building Register:63443: (B)				
Brighton Mills		Heckmondwike, SE 2145 2435 53°42′54″N 1°40′35″W			
	Notes: National Building Register:63437: (B)				
Brunswick Mill		Heckmondwike, SE 2175 2328 53°42′20″N 1°40′19″W		demolished	
	Notes: National Building Register:63655: (B)				
Croft Mills		Heckmondwike, SE 2145 2336 53°42′22″N 1°40′36″W			
	Notes: National Building Register:63441: (B)				
Flush Mills		Heckmondwike, SE 211 236 53°42′30″N 1°40′55″W			
	Notes: National Building Register:63438: (B)				
Grove Mill		Heckmondwike, SE 2200 2375 53°42′35″N 1°40′05″W			
	Notes: National Building Register:63464: (B)				
Longfield Mills		Heckmondwike, SE 2202 2398 53°42′42″N 1°40′04″W			
	Notes: National Building Register:63463: (B)				
Low Mill		Heckmondwike, SE 2172 2279 53°42′04″N 1°40′21″W			
	Notes: National Building Register:63445: (B)				
Lower Mill		Heckmondwike,			
	Notes: (see Low Mill)				
Mill		Heckmondwike, SE 2202 2362 53°42′31″N 1°40′04″W			
	Notes: National Building Register:63656: (B)				
Moorfield Mills		Heckmondwike, SE 2215 2409 53°42′46″N 1°39′57″W			
	Notes: National Building Register:63462: (B)				
Orchard Dyeworks		Heckmondwike, SE 2167 2285 53°42′06″N 1°40′24″W			
	Notes: National Building Register:63444: (B)				
Spen Vale Mills		Heckmondwike, SE 2155 2295 53°42′09″N 1°40′30″W			
	Notes: National Building Register:63442: (B)				
Spen Vale Works		Heckmondwike,			
	Notes: (see Orchard Dyeworks)				
Walkley Mills		Heckmondwike, SE 2180 2280 53°42′04″N 1°40′17″W			
	Notes: National Building Register:63446: (B)				
Westfield Mills		Heckmondwike,			
	Notes: (see Brighton Mills)				
William Royd Mills		Heckmondwike, SE 2215 2419 53°42′49″N 1°39′57″W			
	Notes: National Building Register:63461: (B)				

== Kirkburton ==
Name	Architect	Location	Built	Demolished	Served (Years)
Brookfield Mill		Kirkburton, SE 1595 1300 53°36′48″N 1°45′37″W			
	Notes: National Building Register:53147: (B)				
Dogley Lane Mlll		Kirkburton, SE 1869 1405 53°37′22″N 1°43′08″W			
	Notes: National Building Register:63146: (B)				
Green Grove Mills		Kirkburton, SE 1899 1369 53°37′10″N 1°42′52″W			
	Notes: National Building Register:63151: (A)				
Linfit Mill		Kirkburton, SE 2042 1377 53°37′12″N 1°41′34″W			
	Notes: National Building Register:53772: (B)				
Moxen's Mill		Kirkburton, SE 1945 1325 53°36′56″N 1°42′27″W			
	Notes: National Building Register:63151: (B)				
Springfield Mills		Kirkburton, SE 1915 1305 53°36′49″N 1°42′43″W			
	Notes: National Building Register:63152: (B)				

== Kirkheaton (Kirkburton) ==
Name	Architect	Location	Built	Demolished	Served (Years)
Colne Bridge Mill		Colne Bridge, Huddersfield SE 1772 2030 53°40′44″N 1°44′00″W			
	Notes: National Building Register:62873: (B)				
Gawthorpe Green Dyeworks		Kirkheaton (Kirkburton), SE 1935 1675 53°38′49″N 1°42′32″W			
	Notes: National Building Register:63149: (B)				
Kirkheaton Mills		Kirkheaton (Kirkburton), SE 1805 1785 53°39′25″N 1°43′42″W			
	Notes: National Building Register:63142: (B)				
Levi Mill		Kirkheaton (Kirkburton), SE 1919 1689 53°38′53″N 1°42′40″W			
	Notes: National Building Register:63148: (C)				

== Lepton (Kirkburton) ==
Name	Architect	Location	Built	Demolished	Served (Years)
Cowmes Mill		Lepton (Kirkburton), SE 1800 1608 53°38′27″N 1°43′45″W			
	Notes: National Building Register:63143: (B)				
Fenay Mills		Lepton (Kirkburton), SE 1823 1541 53°38′06″N 1°43′33″W			
	Notes: National Building Register:63144: (B)				
Rowley Mills		Lepton (Kirkburton), SE 1880 1430 53°37′30″N 1°43′02″W			
	Notes: National Building Register:63145: (B)				
Spa Mill		Lepton (Kirkburton),			
	Notes: (see Cowmes Mill)				
Vale Mills		Lepton (Kirkburton), SE 1785 1645 53°38′39″N 1°43′53″W			
	Notes: National Building Register:63140: (B)				
Waterloo Bridge Works		Lepton (Kirkburton), SE 1772 1660 53°38′44″N 1°44′00″W			
	Notes: National Building Register:63139: (B)				
Whitley Wil1ows Mill		Lepton (Kirkburton), SE 1958 1663 53°38′45″N 1°42′19″W			
	Notes: National Building Register:63150: (B)				

== Lingards (Colne) ==
Name	Architect	Location	Built	Demolished	Served (Years)
Britannia Mills		Lingards (Colne), SE 0805 1390 53°37′18″N 1°52′47″W			
	Notes: National Building Register:62995: (B)				
Colne Mills		Lingards (Colne), SE 0790 1390 53°37′18″N 1°52′55″W			
	Notes: National Building Register:62984: (B)				

== Linthwaite (Colne Valley; Huddersfield) ==
Name	Architect	Location	Built	Demolished	Served (Years)
Black Rock Mills (CV)		Linthwaite (Colne Valley; Huddersfield), SE 0965 1380 53°37′14″N 1°51′20″W			
	Notes: National Building Register:63009: (B)1873 (source Huddersfield Examiner Weekly 16 May 1896) demolished early 2000's (source https://www.examinerlive.co.uk/news/west-yorkshire-news/black-rock-mills-homes-plan-6352725)				
Bridge Croft Mills (H)		Linthwaite (Colne Valley; Huddersfield), SE 1172 1587 53°38′21″N 1°49′27″W			
	Notes: National Building Register:63048: (B)				
Burdett Mill (H)		Linthwaite (Colne Valley; Huddersfield), SE 1203 1578 53°38′18″N 1°49′10″W			
	Notes: National Building Register:63173: (B)				
Colne Vale Mill (H)		Linthwaite (Colne Valley; Huddersfield), SE 1123 1579 53°38′19″N 1°49′54″W			
	Notes: National Building Register:63050: (C)				
Elm Ing Mills (H)		Linthwaite (Colne Valley; Huddersfield), SE 1186 1582 53°38′20″N 1°49′20″W			
	Notes: National Building Register:63046: (B)				
Hoyle Ing Dyeworks(CV)		Linthwaite (Colne Valley; Huddersfield), SE 0982 1455 53°37′39″N 1°51′11″W			
	Notes: National Building Register:3006: B)				
Longfield Dyeworks (CV)		Linthwaite (Colne Valley; Huddersfield), SE 0914 1412 53°37′25″N 1°51′48″W			
	Notes: National Building Register:63008: (B)				
Ramsden Mills (CV)		Linthwaite (Colne Valley; Huddersfield), SE 1045 1546 53°38′08″N 1°50′36″W			
	Notes: National Building Register:63025: (A)				
Spring Garden Mill (H)		Linthwaite (Colne Valley; Huddersfield), SE 1165 1575 53°38′17″N 1°49′31″W			
	Notes: National Building Register:63049: (B)				
Spring Grove Mills (CV)		Linthwaite (Colne Valley; Huddersfield), SE 0955 1430 53°37′30″N 1°51′25″W			
	Notes: National Building Register:3007: B)				
Spring Mills (H)		Linthwaite (Colne Valley; Huddersfield), SE 1210 1588 53°38′21″N 1°49′06″W			
	Notes: National Building Register:63059: (B)				
Stanley Mills (H)		Linthwaite (Colne Valley; Huddersfield), SE 1205 1595 53°38′24″N 1°49′09″W			
	Notes: National Building Register:63058: (B)				
Stonefield Mills (H)		Linthwaite (Colne Valley; Huddersfield), SE 1198 1582 53°38′19″N 1°49′13″W			
	Notes: National Building Register:63044: (B)				
Titanic Mill		Linthwaite (Colne Valley; Huddersfield), SE 0975 1465 53°37′42″N 1°51′15″W			
	Notes: National Building Register:63004: Converted to residential use (B)				
Union Mills (H)		Linthwaite (Colne Valley; Huddersfield), SE 1195 1585 53°38′20″N 1°49′15″W			
	Notes: National Building Register:63045: (B)				
Union Mills (H)		Linthwaite (Colne Valley; Huddersfield), SE 1195 1577 53°38′18″N 1°49′15″W			
	Notes: National Building Register:63047: (B)				

== Liversedge ==
Name	Architect	Location	Built	Demolished	Served (Years)
Balm Mills		Liversedge, SE 1973 2256 53°41′57″N 1°42′10″W			
	Notes: National Building Register:62905: (B)				
Broomfield Mills		Liversedge, SE 1805 2502 53°43′17″N 1°43′41″W			
	Notes: National Building Register:62886: (B)				
Crystal Mill		Liversedge, SE 2132 2337 53°42′23″N 1°40′43″W			
	Notes: National Building Register:63440: (B)				
Greenfield Mill		Liversedge,			
	Notes: (see Crystal Mill)				
Hare Park Mills		Liversedge, SE 1866 2367 53°42′33″N 1°43′08″W			
	Notes: National Building Register:62926: (B)				
Lower Rawfolds Mill		Liversedge, SE 1975 2460 53°43′03″N 1°42′08″W			
	Notes: National Building Register:62903: (B)				
Marsh Works		Liversedge, SE 1950 2495 53°43′14″N 1°42′22″W			
	Notes: National Building Register:62899: (B)				
Mill		Liversedge, SE 2079 2373 53°42′34″N 1°41′11″W			
	Notes: National Building Register:63430: (B)				
Mill		Liversedge, SE 2022 2426 53°42′52″N 1°41′42″W			
	Notes: National Building Register:63654: (B)				
Providence Mills		Liversedge, SE 2091 2355 53°42′29″N 1°41′05″W			
	Notes: National Building Register:63433: (B)				
Pyenot Works		Liversedge, SE 1935 2494 53°43′14″N 1°42′30″W			
	Notes: National Building Register:62900: (B)				
Rawfolds Dyeworks		Liversedge, SE 1980 2465 53°43′04″N 1°42′05″W			
	Notes: National Building Register:62902: (B)				
Rayner’s Mill		Liversedge, SE 1842 2401 53°42′44″N 1°43′21″W			
	Notes: National Building Register:62888: (B)				
Spen Valley Carpet Works		Liversedge, SE 2085 2365 53°42′32″N 1°41′08″W			
	Notes: National Building Register:63431: (B)				
Stanley Mill		Liversedge, SE 2009 2427 53°42′52″N 1°41′49″W			
	Notes: National Building Register:63427: (B)				
Tanhouse Mil1		Liversedge, SE 1985 2354 53°42′28″N 1°42′03″W			
	Notes: National Building Register:62904: (B)				
Upper Carr Mills		Liversedge, SE 2012 2432 53°42′54″N 1°41′48″W			
	Notes: National Building Register:63426: (A)				
Valley Mills		Liversedge, SE 2125 2339 53°42′23″N 1°40′46″W			
	Notes: National Building Register:63439: (B)				
Valley Works		Liversedge,			
	Notes: (see Tanhouse Mill)				
Victoria Dyeworks		Liversedge, SE 1830 2410 53°42′47″N 1°43′27″W			
	Notes: National Building Register:62887: (B)				
Victoria Mill		Liversedge, SE 2031 2420 53°42′50″N 1°41′38″W			
	Notes: National Building Register:63428: (B)				
Watergate Mill		Liversedge, SE 2042 2419 53°42′49″N 1°41′32″W			
	Notes: National Building Register:63429: (B)				
Wellington Mills		Liversedge, SE 2075 2352 53°42′28″N 1°41′14″W			
	Notes: National Building Register:63432: (C)				
Woodfield Mill		Liversedge,			
	Notes: (see Tanhouse Mill)				

== Marsden ==
Name	Architect	Location	Built	Demolished	Served (Years)
Bank Bottom Mills		Marsden, SE 047 111 53°35′47″N 1°55′50″W	1824		201
	Notes: National Building Register:62965: 1936: 360 looms Occupied by John Edward Crowther Ltd. (John Crowther & Sons) (B)				
Cellars Clough Mills		Marsden, SE 0585 1254 53°36′34″N 1°54′47″W	1888	demolished (circa 2019)	
	Notes: National Building Register:62968: Owned by Samuel Firth of Gatehead, Marsden (B)				
Clough Lee Mill (Robinson's Mill)		Marsden, Clough Lea SE 0460 1165 53°36′05″N 1°55′55″W	1851	2001	150
	Notes: National Building Register:62962: (B)				
Clough Lee Mill (Middle Mill)		Marsden, Clough Lea SE 0466 1172 53°36′07″N 1°55′52″W	1841	demolished	
	Notes: National Building Register:63157: (B)				
Fall Lane Mills (Kiln Croft Mill)		Marsden, SE 0475 1135 53°35′55″N 1°55′47″W			
	Notes: National Building Register:62963: (B)				
Holme Mills		Marsden, SE 0630 1300 53°36′49″N 1°54′23″W			
	Notes: National Building Register:62979: Owned by Samuel Firth of Gatehead, Marsden (S & C Firth Ltd.)(B)				
Kiln Croft Mill		Marsden,			
	Notes: (see Fall Lane Mills)				
Middle Mill		Marsden			
	Notes: (see Clough Lee Mill, 63157)				
New Mills		Marsden, SE 0505 1170 53°36′07″N 1°55′31″W			
	Notes: National Building Register:62971: J E Crowther and Sons and Colne Valley Spinning Co. 1936: 260 looms (B)				
Ottiwells Mill		Marsden	demolished		
	Notes: (see Bank Bottom Mills); Owner William Horsfall murdered by Luddites on Crosland Moor				
Reedy Carr Mills		Marsden SE 0495 1130 53°35′54″N 1°55′36″W		demolished	
	Notes: National Building Register:62964: Once Taylors Iron Foundry, then J.E.Crowther & Sons (B)				
Upper End Mill (Warehouse Hill Mills)		Marsden SE 0518 1179 53°36′09″N 1°55′23″W		1930s	
	Notes: National Building Register:62970: Silk Mill (B)				
Warehouse Hill Mills		Marsden,			
	Notes: (see Upper End Mill)				
Wood Bottom Mill		Marsden, SE 0537 1200 53°36′16″N 1°55′13″W			
	Notes: National Building Register:62969: Grade II listed building Early 1800s: John Hirst of Slaithwaite. Now a garage(B)				

== Meltham ==
Name	Architect	Location	Built	Demolished	Served (Years)
Albion Mill		Meltham, SE 0940 1067 53°35′33″N 1°51′34″W			
	Notes: National Building Register:63013: (B)				
Bent Ley Mill		Meltham, SE 1098 1125 53°35′52″N 1°50′08″W	1840		185
	Notes: National Building Register:63027: Grade II listed building Built for Charles Brook (Brook and Nephews, silk throwsters, Bentlee Mills) (A)				
Brigg Mill		Meltham, SE 1013 1090 53°35′40″N 1°50′54″W	1866		159
	Notes: National Building Register:63029: (B)				
Brighouse Mill		Meltham,			
	Notes: (see Brigg Mill)				
Lane End Dyeworks		Meltham, SE 1033 1016 53°35′16″N 1°50′44″W			
	Notes: National Building Register:63153: (B)				
Lower Sunny Bank Mill		Meltham, SE 0925 1080 53°35′37″N 1°51′42″W			
	Notes: National Building Register:63011: (B)				
Meltham Mills		Meltham, SE 1090 1085 53°35′39″N 1°50′12″W			
	Notes: National Building Register:63031: (A)				
Mill		Meltham, SE 0953 1077 53°35′36″N 1°51′27″W			
	Notes: National Building Register:63180: (B)				
Moor Road Mills		Meltham, SE 0957 1065 53°35′32″N 1°51′25″W			
	Notes: National Building Register:63014: (B)				
New Bridge Mill		Meltham, SE 0885 1063 53°35′32″N 1°52′04″W			
	Notes: National Building Register:62996: (B)				
Old Mill		Meltham,			
	Notes: (see Brigg Mill)				
Owler Bars Mill		Meltham, SE 0939 1069 53°35′34″N 1°51′35″W			
	Notes: National Building Register:63012: (C)				
Royd Edge Dyeworks		Meltham, SE 1002 0995 53°35′10″N 1°51′00″W			
	Notes: National Building Register:63190: (B)				
Royd Edge Mill		Meltham,			
	Notes: (see Royd Edge Dyeworks)				
Scarr Bottom Dyeworks		Meltham,			
	Notes: (see Scarr Bottom Mill)				
Scarr Bottom Mill		Meltham, SE 1005 1085 53°35′39″N 1°50′59″W			
	Notes: National Building Register:63030: (A)				
Sefton Mills		Meltham, SE 0969 1072 53°35′35″N 1°51′18″W			
	Notes: National Building Register:63015: (C)				
Shoe Broads Mill		Meltham, SE 1049 1090 53°35′40″N 1°50′35″W			
	Notes: National Building Register:63183: (B)				
Spinks Mire Mill		Meltham, SE 1085 1.115 53°35′49″N 1°50′15″W			
	Notes: National Building Register:63028: (B				
Upper Sunn Bank Mill		Meltham, SE 0914 1085 53°35′39″N 1°51′48″W			
	Notes: National Building Register:63010: (B)				
Wilshaw Mill		Meltham, SE 1161 0967 53°35′01″N 1°49′34″W			
	Notes: National Building Register:63191: (B)				

== Mirfield ==
Name	Architect	Location	Built	Demolished	Served (Years)
Bank Mills		Mirfield, SE 1952 2014 53°40′38″N 1°42′21″W			
	Notes: National Building Register:62909: (B)				
Bankfield Mills		Mirfield,			
	Notes: (see Bank Mills)				
Branch Mill		Mirfield, SE 2247 2005 53°40′35″N 1°39′41″W			
	Notes: National Building Register:63473: (B)				
Britannia Mill		Mirfield, SE 2045 1955 53°40′19″N 1°41′31″W			
	Notes: National Building Register:63730: (B)				
Brooklyn Mills		Mirfield, SE 2271 2018 53°40′39″N 1°39′28″W			
	Notes: National Building Register:63474: (B)				
Butt End Mill		Mirfield, SE 2001 1968 53°40′24″N 1°41′55″W			
	Notes: National Building Register:63727: (B)				
Calder Va1e Mills		Mirfield, SE 2275 2020 53°40′40″N 1°39′25″W			
	Notes: National Building Register:63475: (B)				
Clive Mills		Mirfield, SE 1962 2013 53°40′38″N 1°42′16″W			
	Notes: National Building Register:62910: (B)				
Crossley Mills		Mirfield, SE 2008 2166 53°41′28″N 1°41′51″W			
	Notes: National Building Register:63434: (B)				
Fold Head Mill		Mirfield, SE 2015 1979 53°40′27″N 1°41′47″W			
	Notes: National Building Register:63726: (B)				
Holme Bank Mills		Mirfield, SE 206 192 53°40′08″N 1°41′23″W			
	Notes: National Building Register:63731: (B)				
Hopton Mills		Mirfield, SE 2120 1860 53°39′48″N 1°40′50″W			
	Notes: National Building Register:63736: (B)				
Ledgard Bridge Mills		Mirfield, SE 2018 1950 53°40′18″N 1°41′46″W			
	Notes: National Building Register:63728: (B)				
Low Mills		Mirfield, SE 2189 1980 53°40′27″N 1°40′12″W			
	Notes: National Building Register:63735: (B)				
Netherfield Mills		Mirfield, SE 2249 2018 53°40′39″N 1°39′40″W			
	Notes: National Building Register:63471: (C)				
Newtown Mill		Mirfield, SE 2280 2022 53°40′41″N 1°39′23″W			
	Notes: National Building Register:63476: (B)				
Oaklands Mill		Mirfield, SE 2232 2010 53°40′37″N 1°39′49″W			
	Notes: National Building Register:63472: (B)				
Perseverance Mill		Mirfield, SE 1915 2035 53°40′45″N 1°42′42″W			
	Notes: National Building Register:62907: (B)				
Ravens Ing Mill		Mirfield, SE 2308 2045 53°40′48″N 1°39′07″W			
	Notes: National Building Register:63498: (B)				
Raventhorpe Mills		Mirfield, SE 225 202 53°40′40″N 1°39′39″W			
	Notes: National Building Register:63470: (B)				
Roe Head Mill		Mirfield, SE 1931 2199 53°41′38″N 1°42′33″W			
	Notes: National Building Register:62906: (B)				
Sands Mill		Mirfield, SE 1925 2026 53°40′42″N 1°42′36″W			
	Notes: National Building Register:62908: (B)				
South Brook Mills		Mirfield, SE 2026 1945 53°40′16″N 1°41′41″W			
	Notes: National Building Register:63729: (B)				
Spring Place Mill		Mirfield, SE 2170 2065 53°40′55″N 1°40′23″W			
	Notes: National Building Register:63447: (B)				
Wellington Mill		Mirfield, SE 1925 2023 53°40′41″N 1°42′36″W			
	Notes: National Building Register:62911: (B)				
Wharf Mill		Mirfield, SE 2302 2042 53°40′47″N 1°39′11″W			
	Notes: National Building Register:63499: (B)				

== Scammonden (Colne Valley; Elland) ==
Name	Architect	Location	Built	Demolished	Served (Years)
Old House Mill(CV)		Scammonden (Colne Valley; Elland), SE 052 164 53°38′39″N 1°55′22″W			
	Notes: National Building Register:63178: (B)				
Scammonden Mill(CV)		Scammonden (Colne Valley; Elland), SE 0400 1500 53°37′53″N 1°56′28″W			
	Notes: National Building Register:63189: (C)				
Upper Firth House Mills (E)		Scammonden (Colne Valley; Elland), SE 0602 1767 53°39′20″N 1°54′37″W			
	Notes: National Building Register:62976: (B)				

== Shelley (Kirkburton) ==
Name	Architect	Location	Built	Demolished	Served (Years)
Woodhouse Mills		Shelley (Kirkburton), SE 2189 1082 53°35′37″N 1°40′15″W			
	Notes: National Building Register:63737: (B)				

== Shepley (Kirkburton) ==
Name	Architect	Location	Built	Demolished	Served (Years)
Barncliffe Mills		Shepley (Kirkburton), SE 2080 1054 53°35′28″N 1°41′14″W			
	Notes: National Building Register:63734: (B)				
Shepley New Mills		Shepley (Kirkburton), SE 2002 1075 53°35′35″N 1°41′56″W			
	Notes: National Building Register:63732: (C)				
Victoria Mills		Shepley (Kirkburton), SE 1986 0985 53°35′05″N 1°42′05″W			
	Notes: National Building Register:63224: (B)				
Whitby Mill		Shepley (Kirkburton), SE 2001 1046 53°35′25″N 1°41′57″W			
	Notes: National Building Register:63733: (B)				

== Slaithwaite (Colne Valley) ==
Name	Architect	Location	Built	Demolished	Served (Years)
Bank Gate Mill		Slaithwaite (Colne Valley), SE 0764 1418 53°37′27″N 1°53′09″W	mid 19th century		
	Notes: National Building Register:62981: Grade II listed building (B)				
Bridge Street Mill		Slaithwaite (Colne Valley), SE 0820 1398 53°37′20″N 1°52′39″W			
	Notes: National Building Register:62993: (A)				
Clough House Mills		Slaithwaite (Colne Valley), SE 0685 1435 53°37′32″N 1°53′52″W			
	Notes: National Building Register:62977: (C)				
Commercial Mills		Slaithwaite (Colne Valley), SE 0770 1385 53°37′16″N 1°53′06″W			
	Notes: National Building Register:2983: (B)				
Globe Mills		Slaithwaite (Colne Valley), SE 0810 1405 53°37′22″N 1°52′44″W			
	Notes: National Building Register:62992: (A)				
Merrydale Mill		Slaithwaite (Colne Valley), SE 0595 1435 53°37′32″N 1°54′41″W			
	Notes: National Building Register:62967: (C)				
Mill		Slaithwaite (Colne Valley), SE 0819 1420 53°37′27″N 1°52′40″W			
	Notes: National Building Register:63160: (B)				
Mill		Slaithwaite (Colne Valley), SE 082 141 53°37′24″N 1°52′39″W			
	Notes: National Building Register:62990: (B)				
Mill		Slaithwaite (Colne Valley), SE 0769 1408 53°37′23″N 1°53′07″W			
	Notes: National Building Register:63159: (B)				
Platt Mills		Slaithwaite (Colne Valley), SE 0831 1416 53°37′26″N 1°52′33″W			
	Notes: National Building Register:62989: (B)				
Shaw Carr Wood Mill		Slaithwaite (Colne Valley), SE 0680 1334 53°37′00″N 1°53′55″W			
	Notes: National Building Register:62978: (C)				
Spa Mills		Slaithwaite (Colne Valley), SE 0840 1425 53°37′29″N 1°52′28″W	1907		118
	Notes: National Building Register:62988: A)				
Upper Mill		Slaithwaite (Colne Valley), SE 0762 1382 53°37′15″N 1°53′11″W			
	Notes: National Building Register:62982: (B)				
Water Side Mill		Slaithwaite (Colne Valley), SE 0825 1405 53°37′22″N 1°52′36″W			
	Notes: National Building Register:62991: (B)				

== Soothill (Batley; Dewsbury) ==
Name	Architect	Location	Built	Demolished	Served (Years)
Alexandra Mills (B)		Soothill (Batley; Dewsbury), SE 2485 2355 53°42′28″N 1°37′30″W			
	Notes: National Building Register:63521: (B)				
Chickenley Mill(D)		Soothill (Batley; Dewsbury), SE 2622 2118 53°41′11″N 1°36′16″W			
	Notes: National Building Register:63600: (B)				
Culvert Mills (B)		Soothill (Batley; Dewsbury), SE 2510 2451 53°42′59″N 1°37′16″W			
	Notes: National Building Register:63563: (B)				
Greengates Mill (D)		Soothill (Batley; Dewsbury), SE 2683 2164 53°41′26″N 1°35′43″W			
	Notes: National Building Register:63598: (B)				
Greenhill Mills		Soothill (Batley; Dewsbury),			
	Notes: (see Greenhill Dyeworks)				
Hoyle Head Mills (D)		Soothill (Batley; Dewsbury), SE 2562 2129 53°41′15″N 1°36′49″W			
	Notes: National Building Register:63566: (B)				
Jilling Ing Mills (D)		Soothill (Batley; Dewsbury), SE 2610 2110 53°41′08″N 1°36′23″W			
	Notes: National Building Register:63601: (B)				
Lady Ann Mill (B)		Soothill (Batley; Dewsbury), SE 2505 2467 53°43′04″N 1°37′19″W			
	Notes: National Building Register:63562: (B)				
Little Royd Mill (D)		Soothill (Batley; Dewsbury), SE 2534 2110 53°41′09″N 1°37′04″W			
	Notes: National Building Register:63567: (B)				
Mill (B)		Soothill (Batley; Dewsbury), SE 2485 2370 53°42′33″N 1°37′30″W			
	Notes: National Building Register:63644: (B)				
Mill(B)		Soothill (Batley; Dewsbury), SE 2490 2387 53°42′38″N 1°37′27″W			
	Notes: National Building Register:63649: (B)				
Phoenix Mill (B)		Soothill (Batley; Dewsbury), SE 2478 2400 53°42′43″N 1°37′34″W			
	Notes: National Building Register:63514: (A)				
Providence Mill (D)		Soothill (Batley; Dewsbury), SE 2583 2137 53°41′17″N 1°36′37″W	1820		205
	Notes: National Building Register:63565: Grade II listed building(B)				
Savile Mill (B)		Soothill (Batley; Dewsbury), SE 2484 2350 53°42′26″N 1°37′31″W			
	Notes: National Building Register:63522: (B)				
Scar End Mill (D)		Soothill (Batley; Dewsbury), SE 2553 2029 53°40′42″N 1°36′54″W			
	Notes: National Building Register:63571: (B)				
Station Road, 16-18 (B)		Soothill (Batley; Dewsbury), SE 248 238 53°42′36″N 1°37′33″W			
	Notes: National Building Register:709: (B)				
Station Road, 20–22 (B)		Soothill (Batley; Dewsbury), SE 248 238 53°42′36″N 1°37′33″W			
	Notes: National Building Register:710: (B)				
Station Road, 24–26 (B)		Soothill (Batley; Dewsbury), SE 248 238 53°42′36″N 1°37′33″W			
	Notes: National Building Register:711: (B)				
Station Road, 25 (B)		Soothill (Batley; Dewsbury), SE 2482 2392 53°42′40″N 1°37′32″W			
	Notes: National Building Register:63717: (B)				
Station Road, 31–33 (B)		Soothill (Batley; Dewsbury), SE 2485 2389 53°42′39″N 1°37′30″W			
	Notes: National Building Register:63716: (B)				
Station Road, 32–40 (B)		Soothill (Batley; Dewsbury), SE 2489 2378 53°42′35″N 1°37′28″W			
	Notes: National Building Register:63712: (B)				
Station Road, 35–37 (B)		Soothill (Batley; Dewsbury), SE 248 238 53°42′36″N 1°37′33″W			
	Notes: National Building Register:715: (B)				
Station Road, 39 (B)		Soothill (Batley; Dewsbury), SE 248 238 53°42′36″N 1°37′33″W			
	Notes: National Building Register:714: (B)				
Station Road, 47–51 (B)		Soothill (Batley; Dewsbury), SE 2491 2381 53°42′36″N 1°37′27″W			
	Notes: National Building Register:63713: (B)				
Syke Ing Mill (D)		Soothill (Batley; Dewsbury), SE 2615 2135 53°41′17″N 1°36′20″W			
	Notes: National Building Register:63599: (A)				
Syke Ing Mills(D)		Soothill (Batley; Dewsbury), SE 2598 2140 53°41′18″N 1°36′29″W			
	Notes: National Building Register:63564: (B)				
Union Mill (B)		Soothill (Batley; Dewsbury), SE 2490 2348 53°42′26″N 1°37′27″W			
	Notes: National Building Register:63523: (B)				
Warehouse (D)		Soothill (Batley; Dewsbury), SE 2555 2121 53°41′12″N 1°36′53″W			
	Notes: National Building Register:63637: (B)				

== South Crosland (Huddersfield; Meltham) ==
Name	Architect	Location	Built	Demolished	Served (Years)
Armitage Bridge Mills		South Crosland ( Meltham), SE 133 135 53°37′04″N 1°48′02″W			
	Notes: National Building Register:63076: (B)				
Crosland Mills		South Crosland ( Meltham), SE 1175 1215 53°36′21″N 1°49′26″W			
	Notes: National Building Register:63051: (B)				
Dungeon Mill		South Crosland ( Meltham), SE 1305 1430 53°37′30″N 1°48′15″W			
	Notes: National Building Register:63074: (B)				
Park Valley Mills		South Crosland ( Meltham),			
	Notes: (see Dungeon Mill)				
Queen’s Square Mill		South Crosland (Hudddersfield), SE 1413 1265 53°36′37″N 1°47′16″W			
	Notes: National Building Register:63112: (B)				
Steps Mill		South Crosland (Hudddersfield), SE 1401 1281 53°36′42″N 1°47′23″W			
	Notes: National Building Register:63111: (B)				
Steps Mill		South Crosland ( Meltham),			
	Notes: (see Queen’s Square Mill)				
Tolson Dyeworks		South Crosland (Meltham), SE 1310 1380 53°37′14″N 1°48′12″W			
	Notes: National Building Register:63158: (B)				
Upper Steps Mill		South Crosland (Hudddersfield; Meltham), SE 1399 1262 53°36′36″N 1°47′24″W			
	Notes: National Building Register:63156: (B)				

== See also ==
- Heavy Woollen District
- Textile processing
