= Family saga =

Genre of literature

The family saga is a genre of literature which chronicles the lives and doings of a family or a number of related or interconnected families over a period of time. In novels (or sometimes sequences of novels) with a serious intent, this is often a thematic device used to portray particular historical events, changes of social circumstances, or the ebb and flow of fortunes from a multitude of perspectives.

The word saga comes from Old Norse, where it meant "what is said, utterance, oral account, notification" and "(structured) narrative, story (about somebody)", and was originally borrowed into English from Old Norse by scholars in the eighteenth century to refer to the Old Norse prose narratives known as sagas.

The typical family saga follows generations of a family through a period of history in a series of novels. A number of subgenres of the form exist such as the AGA saga.

Successful writers of popular family sagas include Susan Howatch, R. F. Delderfield and Philippa Carr.

== Literature ==
- The sagas of Icelanders – the medieval Icelandic family sagas from which the English word "saga" was derived
- Mahabharata, by Vyasa – the chronicle of the Chandravanshi Rajput clan founded by Puru, also considered the longest poem in human history
- Dream of the Red Chamber – one of the Four Great Classical Novels of Chinese literature, it chronicles the rise and decline of the Jia family
- A Chronicle of Ancient Sunlight, by Henry Williamson
- The Accursed Kings: The series chronicles the fall of the direct French Capetian dynasty in the early to mid-14th century after Philip IV's three sons all die in quick succession without producing male heirs.
- Ada, or Ardor, by Vladimir Nabokov
- Absalom, Absalom!, by William Faulkner
- The Artamonov Business, by Maxim Gorky
- Brideshead Revisited, by Evelyn Waugh
- Beauty Is a Wound, by Eka Kurniawan
- Buddenbrooks, by Thomas Mann
- Captains and the Kings, by Taylor Caldwell
- Harmonia Caelestis, a historicist piece by Péter Esterházy
- The Cairo Trilogy, by Naguib Mahfouz
- The Cazalet Chronicles, by Elizabeth Jane Howard
- The Covenant, by James A. Michener
- The Crowthers of Bankdam, by Thomas Armstrong
- Dune, by Frank Herbert
- East of Eden, by John Steinbeck
- The Emberverse series, by S. M. Stirling
- The Eternal Call by Anatoly Ivanov
- Evergreen, by Belva Plain
- Fall on Your Knees, by Ann-Marie MacDonald
- Family Tree tetralogy, by Ann M. Martin
- The Fate of Šimoniai from Aukštujai, by Ieva Simonaitytė
- Fire & Blood by George R. R. Martin
- The Forsyte Saga, by John Galsworthy
- The Golovlyov Family, by Mikhail Saltykov-Shchedrin
- The Good Earth and its sequels, by Pearl S. Buck
- Holes, by Louis Sachar
- Homegoing, by Yaa Gyasi
- Homestuck, by Andrew Hussie
- The House of the Spirits, by Isabel Allende
- The Immigrants, by Howard Fast
- The Jalna books, by Mazo de la Roche
- The Kent Family Chronicles and The Crown Family Saga, by John Jakes
- Kristin Lavransdatter, by Sigrid Undset
- Os Maias, by Eça de Queiroz
- Old-fashioned Story by Magda Szabó
- I Malavoglia, by Giovanni Verga
- The Mallens, by Catherine Cookson
- Middlesex, by Jeffrey Eugenides
- One Hundred Years of Solitude, by Gabriel García Márquez
- The Oppermanns, by Lion Feuchtwanger
- Pachinko by Min Jin Lee. The novel chronicles the struggles of a family of Korean immigrants in Japan throughout the 20th century.
- The Palaeologian Dynasty. The Rise and Fall of Byzantium, by George Leonardos
- The Promise, by Damon Galgut
- Radetzkymarsch (Radetzky March), by Joseph Roth
- Roma, by Steven Saylor
- Roots, by Alex Haley
- The Silmarillion, by J. R. R. Tolkien
- Sometimes a Great Notion, by Ken Kesey
- Strangers and Brothers, by C. P. Snow
- The Thibaults, by Roger Martin du Gard
- Time and the Wind, by Erico Verissimo
- The Thorn Birds, by Colleen McCullough
- The Lymond Chronicles and The House of Niccolò, Renaissance-set novel series by Dorothy Dunnett
- Under the North Star, by Väinö Linna
- The Vorkosigan Saga, by Lois McMaster Bujold
- White Teeth, by Zadie Smith
- War and Peace, by Leo Tolstoy
- The Witcher, by Andrzej Sapkowski
- The Zhurbins, by Vsevolod Kochetov

== Film and television ==
- A Big Family
- American Pop
- Arrested Development
- The Best of Youth, in Italian La Meglio Gioventù
- Blackadder
- Dark
- The Eternal Call
- Game of Thrones
- The Godfather
- Heimat
- House of the Dragon
- Household Saints
- How the West Was Won
- I, Claudius
- In a Land of Plenty
- JoJo's Bizarre Adventure
- My Country, My Parents
- One Hundred Years of Solitude
- Our Friends in the North
- Raajneeti
- Roots
- Roots: The Next Generations
- Sibiriada
- Star Wars
- Succession
- Sunshine
- Taken
- The Thorn Birds
- The Dirtwater Dynasty
- This Is Us
- Vacas

== Video games ==
- Assassin’s Creed
- Castlevania
- The Case of the Golden Idol
- What Remains of Edith Finch
