= List of mills in Huddersfield =

This is a list of the wool, cotton and other textile mills in Huddersfield, Kirklees, West Yorkshire

== Golcar (Colne Valley; Huddersfield) ==
| Name | Architect | Location | Built | Demolished | Served (Years) |
|---|---|---|---|---|---|
| Albion Mills, Colne Valley | | Brook Lane, Golcar, SE 0965 1551 53°38′10″N 1°51′20″W | 1865 | | 160 |
| | Notes: National Building Register:63003: 1865 Joe Harrison & Co (B) | | | | |
| Brook Mills, Colne Valley | | Golcar, SE 0825 1440 53°37′34″N 1°52′36″W | | | |
| | Notes: National Building Register:62987: (B) | | | | |
| Clough Road Mills, Colne Valley | | Golcar, SE 0815 1455 53°37′39″N 1°52′42″W | | | |
| | Notes: National Building Register:62986: (B) | | | | |
| Commercial Mill, Huddersfield | | Golcar, SE 1154 1616 53°38′31″N 1°49′37″W | 1861 | | 164 |
| | Notes: National Building Register:63042: Partly a Grade II listed building(B) | | | | |
| Dale Street Mills, Huddersfield | | Golcar, SE 1125 1633 53°38′36″N 1°49′53″W | | | |
| | Notes: National Building Register:63040: 1910 J. Hinchliffe & Co.; George Beaumont & Son, 2,000 spindles, 25 looms.(B) | | | | |
| Heath House Mill, Colne Valley | | Golcar, SE 0905 1560 53°38′13″N 1°51′53″W | | | |
| | Notes: National Building Register:63002: 1910 T W Thorpe Ltd (B) | | | | |
| Holme Mill, Colne Valley | | Golcar, SE 1050 1555 53°38′11″N 1°50′34″W | | | |
| | Notes: National Building Register:63024: (B) | | | | |
| Lees Mill, Colne Valley | | Golcar, SE 0895 1436 53°37′32″N 1°51′58″W | | | |
| | Notes: National Building Register:62994: (B) | | | | |
| Loomshop, Ramsden Mill Lane, Colne Valley | | Golcar, SE 1023 1536 53°38′05″N 1°50′48″W | | | |
| | Notes: National Building Register:63185: (A) | | | | |
| Low West Wood Mills, Colne Valley | | Golcar, SE 0950 1458 53°37′40″N 1°51′28″W | 1881 | | 144 |
| | Notes: National Building Register:63005: (B); 1881 Beaumont, Bates & Sons | | | | |
| Low West Woods Upper Mill | | Golcar, | | | |
| | Notes: (see Low Westwood Mills) | | | | |
| Mill, Colne Valley | | Golcar, SE 0999 1579 53°38′19″N 1°51′01″W | | | |
| | Notes: National Building Register:63184: (B) | | | | |
| Milnsbridge Bottom Dyeworks, Huddersfield | | Golcar, SE 1099 1580 53°38′19″N 1°50′07″W | | | |
| | Notes: National Building Register:63021: (B) | | | | |
| Milnsbridge Iron Works, Huddersfield | | Golcar, SE 1195 1595 53°38′24″N 1°49′15″W | | | |
| | Notes: National Building Register:63174: (B) | | | | |
| New Mill (Parkwood Mills) | | Golcar, SE 1035 1685 53°38′53″N 1°50′42″W | | | |
| | Notes: National Building Register:63016: (B) | | | | |
| Parkwood Mills | | Golcar, | | | |
| | Notes: (see New Mill) | | | | |
| Ramsden Mills, Colne Valley | | Golcar, SE 1045 1546 53°38′08″N 1°50′36″W | | | |
| | Notes: National Building Register:63025: (A) | | | | |
| Scarbottom Mills, Huddersfield | | Golcar, SE 1079 1570 53°38′16″N 1°50′18″W | | | |
| | Notes: National Building Register:63022: (B) | | | | |
| Spa Mills, Colne Valley | | Golcar, SE 0840 1425 53°37′29″N 1°52′28″W | | | |
| | Notes: National Building Register:62988: (A) | | | | |
| Stanley Mills, Colne Valley | | Golcar, SE 1070 1575 53°38′17″N 1°50′23″W | | | |
| | Notes: National Building Register:63023: (B) | | | | |
| Victoria Mills, Colne Valley | | Golcar, SE 0945 1565 53°38′14″N 1°51′31″W | | | |
| | Notes: National Building Register:63001: (B) | | | | |
| Weavers Cottage, Colne Valley | | Golcar, SE 0956 1585 53°38′21″N 1°51′25″W | | | |
| | Notes: National Building Register:67049: (B) | | | | |

== Huddersfield ==
| Name | Architect | Location | Built | Demolished | Served (Years) |
|---|---|---|---|---|---|
| Albany Mills (Gladstone Mill) | | Firth St, Huddersfield, SE 1490 1635 53°38′36″N 1°46′34″W | 1868 | | 157 |
| | Notes: National Building Register:63088: Built for John Eastwood; 1910 Albany Mills Co Ltd,, 15,000 spindles(B) | | | | |
| Albion Mill | | Huddersfield, SE 1440 1605 53°38′27″N 1°47′01″W | | | |
| | Notes: National Building Register:63094: 1910 Joshua Whiteley & Co. Ltd., 45,000 spindles (B) | | | | |
| Ash Brow Mills | | Huddersfield, SE 1465 1930 53°40′12″N 1°46′47″W | | | |
| | Notes: National Building Register:63080: (B) | | | | |
| Ash Brow Print Works | | Huddersfield, | | | |
| | Notes: (see Ash Brow Mills) | | | | |
| Aspley Dyeware Mills | | Huddersfield, SE 1510 1645 53°38′40″N 1°46′23″W | | | |
| | Notes: National Building Register:63122: (B) | | | | |
| Aspley Mills | | Huddersfield, SE 1515 1670 53°38′48″N 1°46′20″W | | | |
| | Notes: National Building Register:63121: (B) | | | | |
| Bay Hall Mills | | Huddersfield, SE 1415 1799 53°39′30″N 1°47′14″W | | | |
| | Notes: National Building Register:63081: 1910 Stork Bros,, 8,500 spindles; D. J. Green, 1800 spindles, 31 looms; Charles Walton Ellis Ltd,, 27 looms. (B) | | | | |
| Bay Hall Works | | Huddersfield, SE 1411 1790 53°39′27″N 1°47′17″W | | | |
| | Notes: National Building Register:63176: (B) | | | | |
| Britannia Mills | | Huddersfield, SE 1439 1598 53°38′24″N 1°47′02″W | | | |
| | Notes: National Building Register:63097: (A) | | | | |
| Chapel Hill Mills | | Huddersfield, SE 14 16 53°38′25″N 1°47′23″W | c.1816 | | |
| | Notes: National Building Register:63187: (C) | | | | |
| Colne Bridge Mill | | Colne Bridge, Huddersfield SE 1772 2030 53°40′44″N 1°44′00″W | c. 1792 | | |
| | Notes: National Building Register:62873: 1792 Rawstorne & Co; 1910 Thomas Haigh & Sons, 36,000 spindles; J. Firth & Sons, 40,804 spindles.(B) | | | | |
| Colne Road Mills | | Huddersfield, SE 1445 1595 53°38′23″N 1°46′59″W | 1856 | | 169 |
| | Notes: National Building Register:63098: Built 1856 for John Taylor & Sons of Newsome; 1910 John Taylor Ltd / Harold Faulder, 12 looms; J. Hinchliff & Son, 10 looms; Sykes Bros & Co., 20 looms.(B) | | | | |
| Commercial Mills | | Huddersfield, SE 1470 1600 53°38′25″N 1°46′45″W | 1862 | | 163 |
| | Notes: National Building Register:63163: Built 1862 for John Schofield & Sons; 1910 C. Greenwood & Co., 15,000 spindles (B) | | | | |
| Crescent Mills | | Huddersfield, SE 1319 1611 53°38′29″N 1°48′07″W | | | |
| | Notes: National Building Register:63068: (B) | | | | |
| Deighton Mills | | Huddersfield, SE 1662 1907 53°40′04″N 1°45′00″W | | | |
| | Notes: National Building Register:63130: (B) | | | | |
| Engine Bridge Mills | | Huddersfield, SE 1430 1597 53°38′24″N 1°47′07″W | 1803 | | 222 |
| | Notes: National Building Register:63096: 1910 F. Eastwood & Co. 70 fast looms; G. H. Pontefract; Jesse Clegg, 23 looms (C) | | | | |
| Fairfield Mills | | Huddersfield, SE 1447 1602 53°38′26″N 1°46′57″W | 1854 | | 171 |
| | Notes: National Building Register:63093: 1856 Cockroft & Lumb; 1910 Wm. Hollins & Co. Ltd., 14,000 spindles. (B) | | | | |
| Fern Street Mills | | Huddersfield, SE 1506 1655 53°38′43″N 1°46′25″W | | | |
| | Notes: National Building Register:63165: (B) | | | | |
| Field Mills | | Huddersfield, SE 1545 1825 53°39′38″N 1°46′04″W | | | |
| | Notes: National Building Register:63117: 1874 Fred Carter & Co. (spinners) and T.A.Brown & Co. 1910 Edwin Walker & Co., 2,700 spindles, 121 looms (B) | | | | |
| Firth Street Mills | | Firth St, Huddersfield, SE 1475 1609 53°38′28″N 1°46′42″W | 1866 | | 159 |
| | Notes: National Building Register:63091: Grade II listed building Built 1866 for Benjamin Lockwood. Extension built 1886 for Reuben Hurst. Fred Lawton and Sons Ltd; Part of Huddersfield University (A) | | | | |
| Folly Hall Mills (Kaye's Factory) | | Huddersfield, SE 1419 1599 53°38′25″N 1°47′13″W | 1832 | | 193 |
| | Notes: National Building Register:63095: Grade II* listed building Built by Joseph Kaye, 1832; 1910 Joseph Lumb & Sons, worsted spinner(A) | | | | |
| Gledholt Works | | Huddersfield, SE 1338 1625 53°38′33″N 1°47′57″W | | | |
| | Notes: National Building Register:63175: (B) | | | | |
| Granville Mills | | Huddersfield, SE 1311 1612 53°38′29″N 1°48′11″W | | | |
| | Notes: National Building Register:63066: (B) | | | | |
| Grove Mills (Tan Field Mills) | | Leigh Rd, Huddersfield, SE 1490 1744 53°39′12″N 1°46′34″W | | | |
| | Notes: National Building Register:63083: 1910 J Firth & Sons, 40,804 spindles.(B) | | | | |
| Holme Mills | | Huddersfield, SE 1745 2085 53°41′02″N 1°44′14″W | | | |
| | Notes: National Building Register:62872: (B) | | | | |
| Larchfield Mills | | Firth St, Huddersfield, SE 1482 1618 53°38′31″N 1°46′38″W | 1866 | | 159 |
| | Notes: National Building Register:63090: Grade II listed building Built for George Brook; 1910 Shaw Bros. Ltd,/Rothwell & Bray, commission Part of Huddersfield University(A) | | | | |
| Mill | | Huddersfield, SE 1320 1611 53°38′29″N 1°48′07″W | | | |
| | Notes: National Building Register:63067: (B) | | | | |
| Mill | | Huddersfield, SE 1438 1600 53°38′25″N 1°47′02″W | | | |
| | Notes: National Building Register:63162: (B) | | | | |
| Mill | | Huddersfield, SE 1482 1611 53°38′29″N 1°46′38″W | | | |
| | Notes: National Building Register:63164: (B) | | | | |
| Mill | | Huddersfield, SE 1495 1680 53°38′51″N 1°46′31″W | | | |
| | Notes: National Building Register:63166: (B) | | | | |
| Mill | | Huddersfield, SE 1490 1679 53°38′51″N 1°46′34″W | | | |
| | Notes: National Building Register:63167: (B) | | | | |
| Mill, Salendine Nook | | Huddersfield, SE 1046 1811 53°39′34″N 1°50′36″W | | | |
| | Notes: National Building Register:63188: (B) | | | | |
| Paddock Mills | | Huddersfield, SE 1328 1614 53°38′30″N 1°48′02″W | | | |
| | Notes: National Building Register:63069: (C) | | | | |
| Phoenix Mills | | Learoyd St, Huddersfield, SE 1502 1745 53°39′12″N 1°46′27″W | | | |
| | Notes: National Building Register:63082: Grade II listed building(B) | | | | |
| Priestroyd Mills | | Firth St, Huddersfield, SE 1456 1595 53°38′23″N 1°46′53″W | 1835 | | 190 |
| | Notes: National Building Register:63099: Grade II listed building 1871 Farrer, Stott & Co; 1910 Thos. Shaw & Sons, 2,900 spindles, 28 looms; Chas. Lockwood & Sons, 3000 spindles, also Linthwaite; A. Williamson & Co.; Wilson & Co., 2,400 spindles, 33 looms. (B) | | | | |
| Richmond Mills | | Huddersfield, SE 1475 1726 53°39′06″N 1°46′42″W | | | |
| | Notes: National Building Register:63085: (B) | | | | |
| Riverside Mills | | Huddersfield, SE 1475 1598 53°38′24″N 1°46′42″W | | | |
| | Notes: National Building Register:63100: (B) | | | | |
| Springdale Mills | | Huddersfield, | | | |
| | Notes: (see Starkeys' Mill) | | | | |
| Stanley Mills | | Huddersfield, SE 1272 1719 53°39′04″N 1°48′33″W | | | |
| | Notes: National Building Register:63053: (C) | | | | |
| Starkey's Mill (Springdale Mill, Longroyd Bridge Mill) | | Huddersfield, SE 1376 1615 53°38′30″N 1°47′36″W | 1819 | | 206 |
| | Notes: National Building Register:63065: Partly a Grade II listed building 1822 Starkey, Buckley & Co. 1910 Charles Fitton & Sons; Crowther & Vickerman; A. Sutherland & Co.; Sykes & Wood; B. Armistead & Sons, 3925 spindles; Sandford and Wood. (C) | | | | |
| Tan Field Mills | | Huddersfield, | | | |
| | Notes: (see Grove Mills) | | | | |
| Tower Mills | | Huddersfield, SE 1509 1687 53°38′53″N 1°46′24″W | | | |
| | Notes: National Building Register:63120: (B) | | | | |
| Trafalgar Mills | | Huddersfield, SE 1625 1845 53°39′44″N 1°45′20″W | | | |
| | Notes: National Building Register:63132: (B) | | | | |
| Turnbridge Mill | | Quay St, Huddersfield, SE 1490 1685 53°38′53″N 1°46′34″W | 1845 | | 180 |
| | Notes: National Building Register:63087: 1845 Armitage & Kaye(B) | | | | |
| Union Dyeware Mills | | Huddersfield, SE 1356 1620 53°38′32″N 1°47′47″W | | | |
| | Notes: National Building Register:63064: (B) | | | | |
| Upper Aspley Mills | | Huddersfield, SE 1495 1626 53°38′33″N 1°46′31″W | | | |
| | Notes: National Building Register:63089: (B) | | | | |
| Victoria Mills | | Huddersfield, SE 1480 1730 53°39′07″N 1°46′39″W | | | |
| | Notes: National Building Register:63084: (B) | | | | |
| Waterloo Mills | | Huddersfield, SE 1488 1709 53°39′00″N 1°46′35″W | | | |
| | Notes: National Building Register:63086: (B) | | | | |
| Woodhouse Carr Mills | | Huddersfield, SE 1665 1900 53°40′02″N 1°44′58″W | | | |
| | Notes: National Building Register:63131: (C) | | | | |
| Zetland Mills | | Queen St South, Huddersfield, SE 1460 1608 53°38′28″N 1°46′50″W | 1854 | | 171 |
| | Notes: National Building Register:63092: Grade II listed building(B) | | | | |

== Lockwood (Huddersfield) ==
| Name | Architect | Location | Built | Demolished | Served (Years) |
|---|---|---|---|---|---|
| Albert Mills | | Albert St., Lockwood (Huddersfield), SE 1405 1555 53°38′11″N 1°47′20″W | 1854 | | 171 |
| | Notes: National Building Register:63108: Grade II listed building (A) | | | | |
| Bath Mills | | Lockwood (Huddersfield), SE 1397 1545 53°38′07″N 1°47′25″W | c.1850 | | |
| | Notes: National Building Register:63109: 1910 Allen Priest & Sons Ltd., 8,400 spindles (B) | | | | |
| Britannia Mills (Firths Mill) | | Stoney Battery Rd., Lockwood (Huddersfield), SE 1260 1598 53°38′25″N 1°48′39″W | 1861 | | 164 |
| | Notes: National Building Register:63060: Grade II listed building (A) | | | | |
| Broadfield Mills | | Albert St., Lockwood (Huddersfield), SE 1385 1530 53°38′03″N 1°47′31″W | 1843 | demolished | |
| | Notes: National Building Register:63169: Berry and Crowther; 1910 Kaye & Stewart, 300 looms. (B) | | | | |
| Crosland Moor Mill (Croslands Mill) | | Lockwood (Huddersfield), SE 1305 1593 53°38′23″N 1°48′15″W | | | |
| | Notes: National Building Register:63070: (B) | | | | |
| Croslands Mill | | Lockwood (Huddersfield), | | | |
| | Notes: (see Crosland Moor Mill) | | | | |
| Firths Mill | | Lockwood (Huddersfield), | | | |
| | Notes: (see Britannia Mills) | | | | |
| Mark Bottom's Mill | | Lockwood (Huddersfield), SE 1270 1599 53°38′25″N 1°48′34″W | | | |
| | Notes: National Building Register:63061: (B) | | | | |
| Melbourne Mills | | Lockwood (Huddersfield), SE 1376 1519 53°37′59″N 1°47′36″W | | | |
| | Notes: National Building Register:63168: (B) | | | | |
| Mill | | Lockwood (Huddersfield), SE 1378 1530 53°38′03″N 1°47′35″W | | | |
| | Notes: National Building Register:63170: (B) | | | | |
| Rashcliffe Brass/IronWorks | | Lockwood (Huddersfield), SE 1415 1570 53°38′15″N 1°47′15″W | | | |
| | Notes: National Building Register:63171: (B) | | | | |
| Rashcliffe Mills | | Lockwood (Huddersfield), SE 1420 1580 53°38′19″N 1°47′12″W | | | |
| | Notes: National Building Register:63104: (B) | | | | |
| Victoria Mills | | Lockwood (Huddersfield), SE 1405 1559 53°38′12″N 1°47′20″W | | | |
| | Notes: National Building Register:63107: (B) | | | | |
| Woollen Mill | | Lockwood (Huddersfield), SE 1401 1565 53°38′14″N 1°47′23″W | | | |
| | Notes: National Building Register:63106: (B) | | | | |

== Longwood (Colne Valley;Huddersfield) ==
| Name | Architect | Location | Built | Demolished | Served (Years) |
|---|---|---|---|---|---|
| Quarmby Mill | | Longwood, | | | |
| | Notes: (see George Street Mill) | | | | |
| Stafford Mills, Huddersfield | | Longwood, SE 1219 1600 53°38′25″N 1°49′02″W | | | |
| | Notes: National Building Register:63057: (B) | | | | |
| Sunny Bank Mills, Huddersfield | | Longwood, SE 1098 1663 53°38′46″N 1°50′07″W | | | |
| | Notes: National Building Register:63020: C & J Hirst (B) | | | | |
| Woodland Mills, Huddersfield | | Longwood, SE 1115 1640 53°38′38″N 1°49′58″W | | | |
| | Notes: National Building Register:63039: (B) | | | | |

== See also ==
- Heavy Woollen District
- Textile processing
