= Joe Hyman =

British textile entrepreneur (1921–1999)

- Born: 14 October 1921; Manchester, England
- Died: 6 July 1999 (aged 77)
- Occupation: Textile entrepreneur
- Spouses: Corrinne Abrahams (m. 1948, divorced); Simone Duke (m. 1963)
- Children: 4

Joe Hyman (14 October 1921 – 6 July 1999) was a British textile industrialist who built one of the leading textile groups of the 1960s, Viyella International.

== Early life ==
Hyman was born in Manchester into a family long involved in the textile trade, which traced its origins to a great-grandfather émigré of Russian-Jewish origin. He attended North Manchester Grammar School and left at sixteen to work in the textile industry. Initially reluctant to join the family firm, Hyman began trading clearance garments from a small Manchester office.

== Career ==
After an early business failure, Hyman purchased a small knitting company in Suffolk in 1957, renaming it Gainsborough Fabrics. He expanded through acquisitions, including the Cornard mill and, in 1961, William Hollins, owner of the Viyella brand. Under his leadership, Viyella was transformed from a traditional pajama fabric into a fashionable label associated with modern lifestyles. Backed by investment from Imperial Chemical Industries (ICI), Hyman pursued integration across spinning, weaving, and finishing, ultimately controlling more than forty companies by the late 1960s.

In December 1969, a boardroom revolt ended his control of Viyella International, which was later absorbed into what became Coats Viyella. Hyman later led the Yorkshire woollen firm John Crowther until his retirement in 1981.

== Later life and death ==
After leaving the textile industry, Hyman lived in Surrey, developing a country estate. Known for his cultured interests, he supported music and charitable causes, serving as a trustee of the Pestalozzi Children's Village Trust and as London School of Economics governor. He died on 6 July 1999 at the age of 77. Hyman was married twice. He was survied by his second wife, Simone Duke, and four children.
