= Pilling Always Pays =

1954 novel

- First edition
- Author: Thomas Armstrong
- Language: English
- Genre: Drama
- Publisher: Collins
- Publication date: 1954
- Publication place: United Kingdom
- Media type: Print
- Pages: 447
- Preceded by: The Crowthers of Bankdam
- Followed by: Sue Crowther's Marriage

Pilling Always Pays is a 1954 family saga novel by the British writer Thomas Armstrong. It is the second in the Crowther Chronicles and the sequel to his 1940 bestseller The Crowthers of Bankdam. It follows the further adventures of the Crowther family of mill owners now led in the 1930s by Sam Pilling, the grandson of Simeon Crowther. A review in News Chronicle described it as being "as good as The Crowthers of Bankdam". Two further novels in the series Sue Crowther's Marriage and Our London Office were published.

It was named as a best seller for the week in The West Australian newspaper on 24 December 1954.

== Bibliography ==
- Alfred, Thomas. Sequels: Incorporating Aldred & Parker's 'Sequel Stories'. Association of Assistant Librarians, 1955.
- Snell, Keith. The Bibliography of Regional Fiction in Britain and Ireland, 1800–2000. Routledge, 2017.
