= John Edward Crowther =

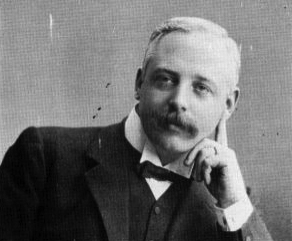
- Born: 10 June 1862; West Riding of Yorkshire, England
- Died: 4 July 1931 (aged 69); Marsden, West Riding of Yorkshire, England
- Occupations: Businessman, mill owner

John Edward Crowther (1862–1931) was a businessman and philanthropist who ran a large woollen manufacturing operation, John Edward Crowther Ltd, based at Bank Bottom Mill in Marsden, West Yorkshire. During his life he made a number of charitable donations to the village and people of Marsden. He died on 4 July 1931 following the Great Depression and the subsequent hardship caused to his business and those dependent on it.

== Early life ==
John Edward Crowther was born on 10 June 1862 in the West Riding of Yorkshire. He was the son of Joseph Stoner Crowther, a clothier (1843-1905) and his wife Helen. His brothers David Stoner Crowther and John Hilton Crowther would also would go into the mill business.

== Career ==
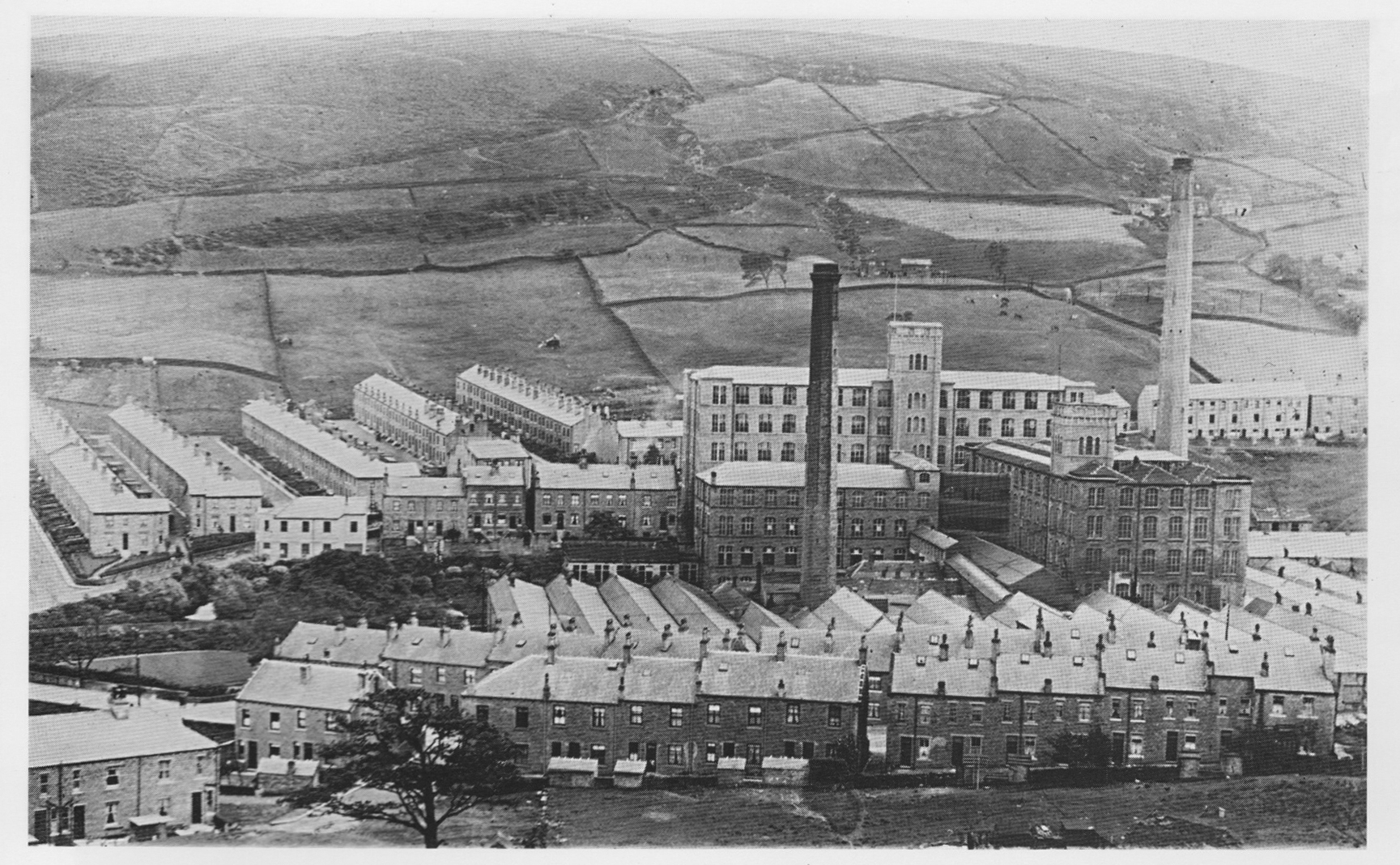
Bank Bottom Mill in its heyday, c. 1923

=== John Edward Crowther Ltd ===
John Edward Crowther owned and ran the family company John Edward Crowther Ltd based at Bank Bottom Mill in Marsden, which in the early part of the 20th century was one of the largest cloth producing mills owned by a single individual in the world.

Crowther's Bank Bottom Mill reached the peak of its prosperity during the Great War, expanding to take over Fall Lane Mill and The Foundry. At its peak, 1,000 looms produced woollen cloth for army, navy and air force uniforms. On May 30th 1918 King George V and Queen Mary personally visited the Marsden mills.

Work at the mills was hard, and the hours long. Work began at 6.30am, with buzzers sounding at 6am to wake the whole village. Late arrivals would be locked out for the day, with no wages paid for the day. Workers worked a 48 hours week, including Saturday mornings. In addition, actual wages depended on the amount of work completed, and the cloth woven by the weavers had to be flawless, else deductions would be made from wages.

As the mills expanded, the population of Marsden grew from 4,370 in 1901 to 5,757 in 1911.

=== Philanthropy ===
John Edward Crowther was responsible for a number of charitable donations to the town of Marsden, such as the purchase and donation of an ambulance in 1912. After the Great War, in 1930, Crowther donated land for the clubhouse of the local chapter of the British Legion. He also helped to maintain a curate at the parish church and helped pay for the peal of bells in the church tower.

== Death and legacy ==
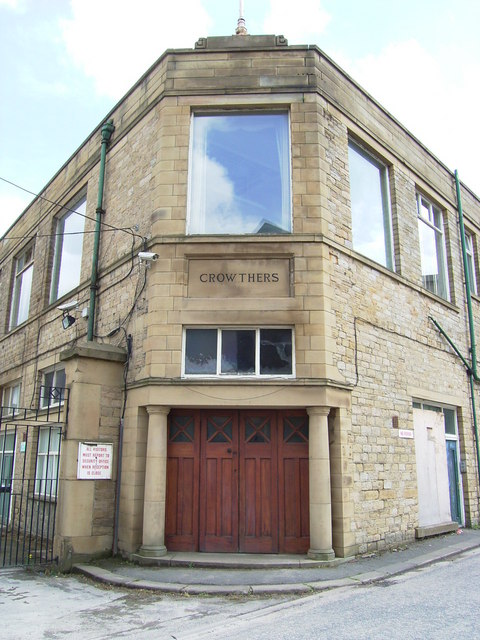
Entrance to John Crowther Mills

On 7 April 1930 his wife died. In 1931 the economic downturn caused by the Great Depression caused the mill to work short time, and on 4 July 1931 Crowther took his own life. When he was cremated on 8 July, the mills in Marsden closed, shops shut and drew their blinds, and flags flew at half mast on the mills and other buildings in the town.

The company that bears his name, John Edward Crowther Ltd, remains in business today, manufacturing textiles and also dealing in real estate.

The 1940 novel The Crowthers of Bankdam is loosely based upon the fortunes of John Edward Crowther and his family. In 1947 the novel was adapted into the film Master of Bankdam, directed by Walter Forde and starring Anne Crawford, Dennis Price and Tom Walls.

== See also ==
- Bank Bottom Mill
- John Edward Crowther Ltd
- Marsden
- Master of Bankdam
- The Crowthers of Bankdam
