= Adam Brunskill =

1952 novel by Thomas Armstrong

- First edition
- Author: Thomas Armstrong
- Language: English
- Genre: Historical drama
- Publisher: William Collins, Sons
- Publication date: 1952
- Publication place: United Kingdom
- Media type: Print

Adam Brunskill is a 1952 historical novel by the British writer Thomas Armstrong. It was his fourth novel and as with much of his work focuses on Northern England. Drawing on the tradition of interwar regional writing of the area, it enjoyed significant popularity along with another new Armstrong novel King Cotton. It is the only major work to focus on the lead mining industry of the Yorkshire Dales.

== Synopsis ==
In the 1880s, a young man raised in Spain in the expatriate British mining community of Andalusia returns to his father's native England.

== Bibliography ==
- Hutchinson, Roger. Walking to America. Birlinn, 2013.
- Russell, Dave. Looking North: Northern England and the National Imagination. Manchester University Press, 2004.
- Snell, Keith. The Bibliography of Regional Fiction in Britain and Ireland, 1800–2000. Routledge, 2017.
