= King Cotton (disambiguation) =

King Cotton was a phrase used to illustrate the importance of cotton to the Confederate economy.

King Cotton may also refer to:

- King Cotton (march), a military march composed in 1895
- King Cotton (novel), a 1947 novel by Thomas Armstrong
- King Cotton (play), a musical written by Jimmy McGovern and directed by Jude Kelly
- King Cotton (performer), stage name of Dicky Sony
- King Cotton Classic, a national level high school basketball tournament
- King Cotton, an album by Northern English folk band Fivepenny Piece
