= This Kind of Trouble =

2025 novel by Tochi Eze

- Author: Tochi Eze
- Publisher: Random House
- Publication date: August 5, 2025
- Pages: 320
- ISBN: 978-1-529-92876-1

This Kind of Trouble is the debut novel by Nigerian writer Tochi Eze, published on August 5, 2025, by Random House in the United States and Cornerstone in the United Kingdom. The multi-generational literary and historical fiction work spans a tumultuous century, tracing the history and complex legacy of one family across continents.

== Plot summary ==
The novel is a sweeping family saga told across three interwoven timelines, spanning from a small Nigerian village in the early 1900s to Lagos and Atlanta in 2005.

The main thread begins in 1960s Lagos, a city energized by Nigeria's newfound independence. Margaret Okolo, a headstrong young Nigerian woman, meets Benjamin Fletcher, a British-born man of mixed Nigerian heritage. Benjamin is in Lagos seeking a connection to his roots following the death of his half-Nigerian father. Despite Margaret's initial reservations, their connection is immediate, and they fall into a forbidden, passionate love.

As the couple exchanges stories, they begin to uncover a deeply intertwined past, discovering their ancestries were connected decades earlier in Margaret's ancestral village, Umumilo.

The shadow of a mysterious, century-old scandal in Umumilo, combined with the onset of Margaret's deteriorating mental health, eventually splinters their relationship. Benjamin leaves Margaret and their young daughter, Nwando, behind in Lagos, settling alone in Atlanta, Georgia. For the next forty years, the couple remains estranged, with Margaret believing her family has been cursed for marrying against the wishes of the village elders.

By 2005, the story converges on the present. Margaret is retired in an upscale gated community in Lagos, and Benjamin, now 67, is a successful but isolated man in Atlanta dealing with heart problems and a profound lack of next-of-kin.

Their settled, separate lives are shattered when their adult daughter, Nwando, reaches out with an urgent request: their grandson, Chuka, is exhibiting troubling signs that eerily echo Margaret's past struggles. Fearing a generational curse, Margaret has invited a healer from Umumilo to perform a cleansing ritual for the entire family, which necessitates Benjamin’s return to Nigeria. The former lovers are thus forced to reunite to confront the buried secrets of their youth and the unresolved ancestral burdens that have followed them through the generations.
