= Lewis Wrathmell =

English cricketer

- Born: 22 January 1855; Kirkheaton, Yorkshire, England
- Died: 16 September 1928 (aged 73); Dewsbury, Yorkshire, England

Lewis Franklin Wrathmell (22 January 1855 – 16 September 1928) was an English first-class cricketer, who made his only appearance for Yorkshire County Cricket Club against Cambridge University, at Fenner's in 1886. Batting at number four, he scored seventeen runs before he was caught by the university's wicket-keeper, Knatchbull-Hugessen, off the bowling of Dorman in Yorkshire's first innings of 154. He fell LBW to the same bowler for one run, as Yorkshire were bowled out for 124, to lose the game by twenty six runs.

Wrathmell was born in Kirkheaton, Yorkshire, England, and died, aged 73, in Dewsbury, Yorkshire.
