= John Edward Crowther Ltd =

John Edward Crowther Ltd is a British textile and real estate company headquartered in Marsden, West Yorkshire, and incorporated in the United Kingdom. It was historically an important producer of woollen cloth in Marsden, West Yorkshire, England. Its premises at Bank Bottom Mill reached its heyday in the late nineteenth and early twentieth centuries under the ownership of the Crowther family, in particular John Edward Crowther, a businessman and philanthropist. However, the cloth industry declined in the late twentieth century, and production of woollen cloth finally ceased in 2003.

== History ==
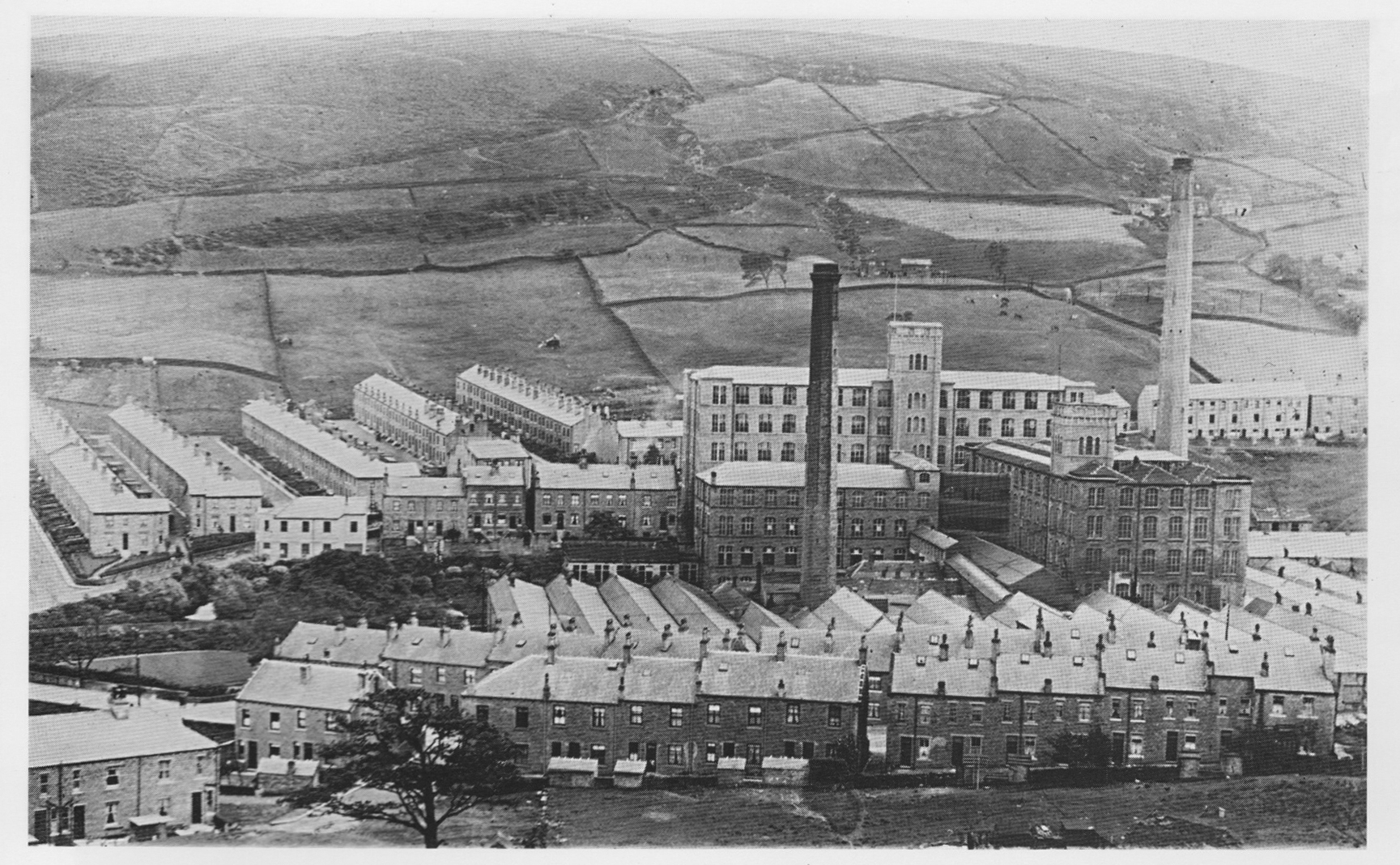
Bank Bottom Mill in its heyday, c. 1923

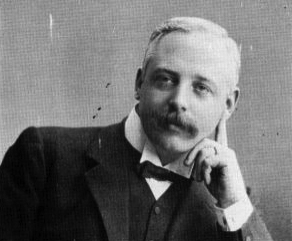
John Edward Crowther, mill owner

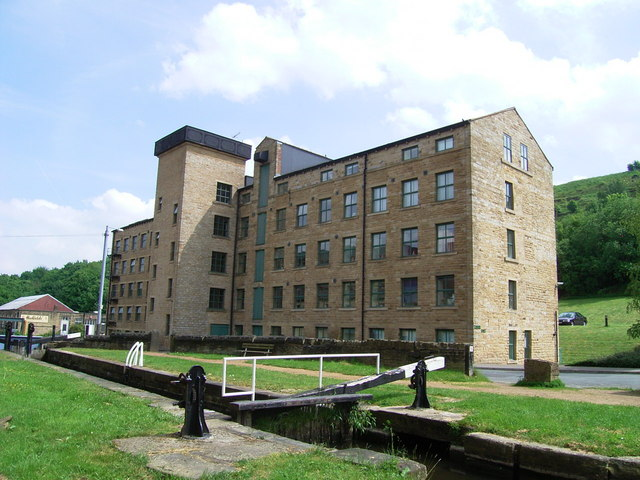
Burdett Mill, Milnsbridge

Work at John Edward Crowther Ltd began at 6.30am, with buzzers sounding at 6am to wake the whole village. Late arrivals would be locked out for the day, with no wages paid for the day. Workers worked a 48-hour week, including Saturday mornings. In addition, actual wages depended on the amount of work completed, and the cloth woven by the weavers had to be flawless, else deductions would be made from wages.

As the mills expanded, the population of Marsden grew from 4,370 in 1901 to 5,757 in 1911.

Business boomed during the 1914-18 war, thanks to the huge demand for woollen cloth needed to clothe men in uniform. King George V and Queen Mary visited the company's mills on 30 May 1918, as a mark of appreciation of the contribution it was making to the continued war effort.

The business was run by John Edward Crowther, a businessman and philanthropist who made a number of charitable donations to the village and people of Marsden. In 1931 the economic downturn caused by the Great Depression caused the mill to work short time, and on 4 July 1931 Crowther took his own life.

=== Decline and closure ===
By the late 20th and early 21st century the Yorkshire textile industry had fallen on hard times, and Bank Bottom Mill closed in 2003, with the loss of 275 jobs.

== See also ==
- John Edward Crowther
- Milnsbridge
- Marsden, West Yorkshire
