= Viyella =

Brand name for a wool-cotton blend fabric formerly produced in the United Kingdom

Viyella logo

Viyella is a blend of wool and cotton first woven in 1893 in England, and the "first branded fabric in the world". It was made of 55% merino wool and 45% cotton in a twill weave, developed by James and Robert Sissons of William Hollins & Co, spinners and hosiers. The brand name, first registered as a trademark in 1894, and registered in the United States in 1907, soon covered not only the original fabric, to be sold by the yard (piece goods), but also clothing. At first this was made by separate businesses, but it was not long before Hollins started producing their own clothes and offering franchises to manufacturers who would use the Viyella label. Following increasing emphasis on garment manufacture over the years, Viyella is now a fashion brand for clothes and home furnishings made of a variety of fabrics. The original wool/cotton blend is no longer sold.

== The fabric ==
Viyella was a soft dress-weight fabric that was more resistant to shrinkage than any comparable pure wool alternative (challis, for example). In its early years it was marketed as a fabric which combined lightness and fashion with warmth and durability. One 1920s advertisement called it a "guaranteed unshrinkable fine wool flannel" for women who wanted both "daintiness" and "protectiveness". By the early 20th century it came in various weights and widths, some rather narrow by today's standards, and in both plain colours and woven or printed patterns, and was exported from the United Kingdom to other English-speaking countries. Towards the end of the 20th century it was woven in 150 cm (59 in) wide lengths suitable for modern garment design and production.

Viyella
- Industry: clothing retailer
- Founded: 1893
- Headquarters: England
- Key people: James Sissons; Robert Sissons
- Products: clothes home furnishings

The first ready-made garments using Viyella were shirts and nightgowns, and soon came dresses, slips and other clothing, much of it produced under franchise arrangements using the Viyella trademark. It was also made into sheets, and at one time Viyella yarn was available for home knitting.

In the mid-20th century the fabric was popular for children's clothes, from babies' nightgowns to winter shirts for British schoolchildren, and for pyjamas, shirts and dresses; it became associated with sensible, cosy clothing. Officers in the British and other Commonwealth armies purchased their own uniforms during the Second World War, and Viyella shirts were a desirable option. In the late 20th century it was 're-invented' as fashionable fabric. In 1987 The Times said it was used by designers interested in "vintage" style, like Laura Ashley, and creators of "modern classics".

Clydella was a cheaper, less soft alternative made with 81 per cent cotton, produced at factories in the Clydeside area, including Glasgow and Hamilton, where Viyella was also woven.

Hollins also produced the related Dayella cloth used especially for babies' clothes.

== The companies ==
The name Viyella is based on the unusually-named valley road, Via Gellia (the A5012) near Matlock, where in 1890 Hollins & Co acquired a mill used for the early production of Viyella. Hollins had started business in 1784 in Pleasley, about 20 miles away on the Derbyshire/Nottinghamshire border. Later their offices were at Viyella House in Nottingham.

After a merger in 1961, Hollins became Viyella International, led by Joe Hyman, who in the next few years acquired a series of related companies, with Viyella growing to be one of the biggest textile businesses in the UK, owning 40 factories across the country. After a few years as Carrington Viyella and then Vantona Viyella, the company owning the brand became Coats Viyella (Coats Paton, now Coats Group plc), who in the 1980s built a new mill to produce Viyella cloth in Barrowford, Lancashire, but this was demolished in 1999. In the 21st century much of Coats manufacturing (now specialising in thread) has been moved abroad to far east countries and it is no longer possible to buy Viyella fabric in the UK. Coats underwent major restructuring in 2002 and sold off its Viyella fashion retail business (and Jaeger) to entrepreneur Richard Thompson in 2003 for £1, who re-sold Viyella weeks later to venture capitalist Harris Watson. Viyella Ladieswear has since added home furnishings to its range of goods. The fashion chain entered Administration on 7 January 2009 citing "an assessment of the current economic situation and the prospects for the future" as the cause.

In 2009, the upmarket retailer Austin Reed agreed to buy Viyella for an undisclosed sum.

In late 2011, Viyella opened its flagship store next to Austin Reed at 92 Regent Street, London.

== Literature ==
- The Times: Fashion: Soft touch for a romantic, 8 September 1987
- The Times: Obituary of "Joe Hyman, textile magnate", 8 July 1999
- Daily Telegraph: Thompson measures Austin Reed bid, 28 March 2003
- Viyella history
- Textiles in the Glasgow area
