= The Crowthers of Bankdam =

1940 novel

- First edition
- Author: Thomas Armstrong
- Language: English
- Genre: Historical
- Publisher: Collins
- Publication date: 1940
- Publication place: United Kingdom
- Media type: Print
- Followed by: Pilling Always Pays

The Crowthers of Bankdam is a 1940 historical novel by the British writer Thomas Armstrong. His debut novel, it is a family saga following the fortunes of the Crowther family of Yorkshire mill owners across several generations from 1854. A popular success, it was followed by three sequels collectively known as the Crowther Chronicles.

== Film adaptation ==
In 1947 it was adapted into the film Master of Bankdam, directed by Walter Forde and starring Anne Crawford, Dennis Price and Tom Walls.

== See also ==
- John Edward Crowther
- Master of Bankdam

== Bibliography ==
- Goble, Alan. The Complete Index to Literary Sources in Film. Walter de Gruyter, 1999.
- Watson, George & Willison, Ian R. The New Cambridge Bibliography of English Literature, Volume 4. CUP, 1972.
- Young, Kenneth. The Second Bed Post: A Miscellany of The Yorkshire Post. Macdonald, 1964.
