= Master of Bankdam =

- 1-sheet theatrical poster
- Directed by: Walter Forde
- Screenplay by: Edward Dryhurst; Moie Charles (additional dialogue)
- Based on: The Crowthers of Bankdam by Thomas Armstrong
- Produced by: Edward Dryhurst; Walter Forde
- Starring: Anne Crawford; Dennis Price; Tom Walls; Stephen Murray; Linden Travers; David Tomlinson
- Cinematography: Basil Emmott
- Edited by: Terence Fisher
- Music by: Arthur Benjamin
- Production company: Holbein Films
- Distributed by: General Film Distributors (UK)
- Release date: 29 September 1947
- Running time: 105 minutes
- Country: United Kingdom
- Language: English

Master of Bankdam (called The Master of Bankdam in its own credits) is a 1947 British historical film directed by Walter Forde and starring Anne Crawford, Dennis Price, Tom Walls, Stephen Murray, Linden Travers and David Tomlinson. It was written by Edward Dryhurst with additional dialogue by Moie Charles, based on the 1940 novel The Crowthers of Bankdam by Thomas Armstrong, and produced by Forde and Edward Dryhurst.

The story concerns two generations of brothers who struggle for control of the family business in 19th century Yorkshire.

== Plot ==
The film begins in the 1850s at the time of the Crimean War. Bankdam is a small Yorkshire mill run by the Crowther family. It prospers and grows under its patriarch owner, Simeon Crowther. After family upheavals the firm goes through several crises under the management of his sons Zebediah and Joshua, who tend to oppose one another. Joshua dies with many others in a mill collapse, partially blamed on his brother Zebediah. Joshua's role is taken over by his son Simeon (junior). Later, the old patriarch, Simeon (senior), dies.

Zebediah is diagnosed with a rare heart condition and retires to Vienna for specialist treatment, leaving his son, Lancelot Handel, with power of attorney in his absence. Things at the mill deteriorate due to the new American McKinley Tariff and mismanagement. Lancelot reacts by firing men indiscriminately. Anger grows in the community. In the final scene a fatally ill Zebediah returns and, with a mob outside the door, chastises Lancelot for squandering money and ruining the family firm. Zebediah talks down an angry mob outside. Simeon Junior then promises to reopen the mills. Zebediah hears Simeon's speech to the crowd and decides Simeon must be the new Master of Bankdam and entrusts Bankdam.

== Cast ==
- Anne Crawford as Annie Pickersgill
- Dennis Price as Joshua Crowther
- Tom Walls as Simeon Crowther Senior
- Stephen Murray as Zebediah Crowther
- Linden Travers as Clara Baker
- Jimmy Hanley as Simeon Crowther Junior
- Nancy Price as Lydia Crowther
- David Tomlinson as Lancelot Handel Crowther
- Patrick Holt as Lemuel Pickersgill
- Herbert Lomas as Tom France
- Frederick Piper as Ben Pickersgill
- Beatrice Varley as Mrs Pickersgill
- Raymond Rollett as Handel Baker
- April Stride as Sophie Teresa Crowther
- Avis Scott as Mary Crowther
- Nicholas Parsons as Edgar Hoylehouse
- Maria Var as the singer
- Shelagh Fraser as Alice France
- Edgar K. Bruce as Ezra Hoylehouse
- Frank Henderson as Doctor Clough
- Aubrey Mallalieu as Doctor Bouviere
- Kenneth Buckley as Brough
- Lyn Evans as Shires
- Bertram Shuttleworth as Shires
- Amy Veness as Mrs Pilling

== Production ==
The music was by Arthur Benjamin, performed by The London Philharmonic Orchestra and conducted by Muir Mathieson. There is also evidence that it was produced by Ernest G. Roy of Nettlefold Studios, according to his death notices.

The film was made by Holbein Films at Nettlefold Studios, Walton-on-Thames, Surrey, England. It was produced by Rank Films and distributed by Prestige Films.

== Reception ==
The Monthly Film Bulletin wrote: "This is another of these three-generation stories, this time a British effort and a good one. The canvas is enormous but the screen play has been most efficiently written by Edward Dryhurst. The pattern is ever the same: old man, two sons, one good, t'other bad; two grandsons, one a ne'er-do-well, t'other all he should be. There is a most realistic scene of the old mill collapsing and the good son dies. We have seen many family sagas, but this is one of the better ones: it is strong and gripping and it'll make you cry; it's natural and human and makes you laugh. Tom Walls grows old charmingly and with restraint. It is well directed."

Kine Weekly wrote: "Spectacular and spacious romantic melodrama, a workmanlike and showmanlike screen translation of Thomas Armstrong's widely read saga of the Yorkshire woollen industry ... The skilful interplay of sharply drawn character paves the way to much thoughtful and exciting detail as well as moving and hectic drama. Its moral is perhaps a triple obscure, but few will deny that there is wisdom in letting the individual picturegoer draw his own conclusions."

Variety wrote: "Direction is concise and unruffled and on its merits alone, apart from fame as best-selling novel, film should attract popular support."

In The Radio Times Guide to Films David Parkinson gave the film 3/5 stars, writing: "This is a thunderingly good melodrama spanning virtually the entire Victorian era. Tom Walls is all accent and folly as the head of a mill-owning northern family who entrusts the business to the wrong son. But the feud between swaggering Stephen Murray and his gritty brother Dennis Price is nothing compared to the rivalry between the foppish David Tomlinson and the down-to-earth Jimmy Hanley."

In British Sound Films: The Studio Years 1928–1959 David Quinlan rated the film as "good", writing: "Family saga is a bit ponderous at times, but grippingly effective in the end."
