= Bank Bottom Mill =

Former textile mill in West Yorkshire, England

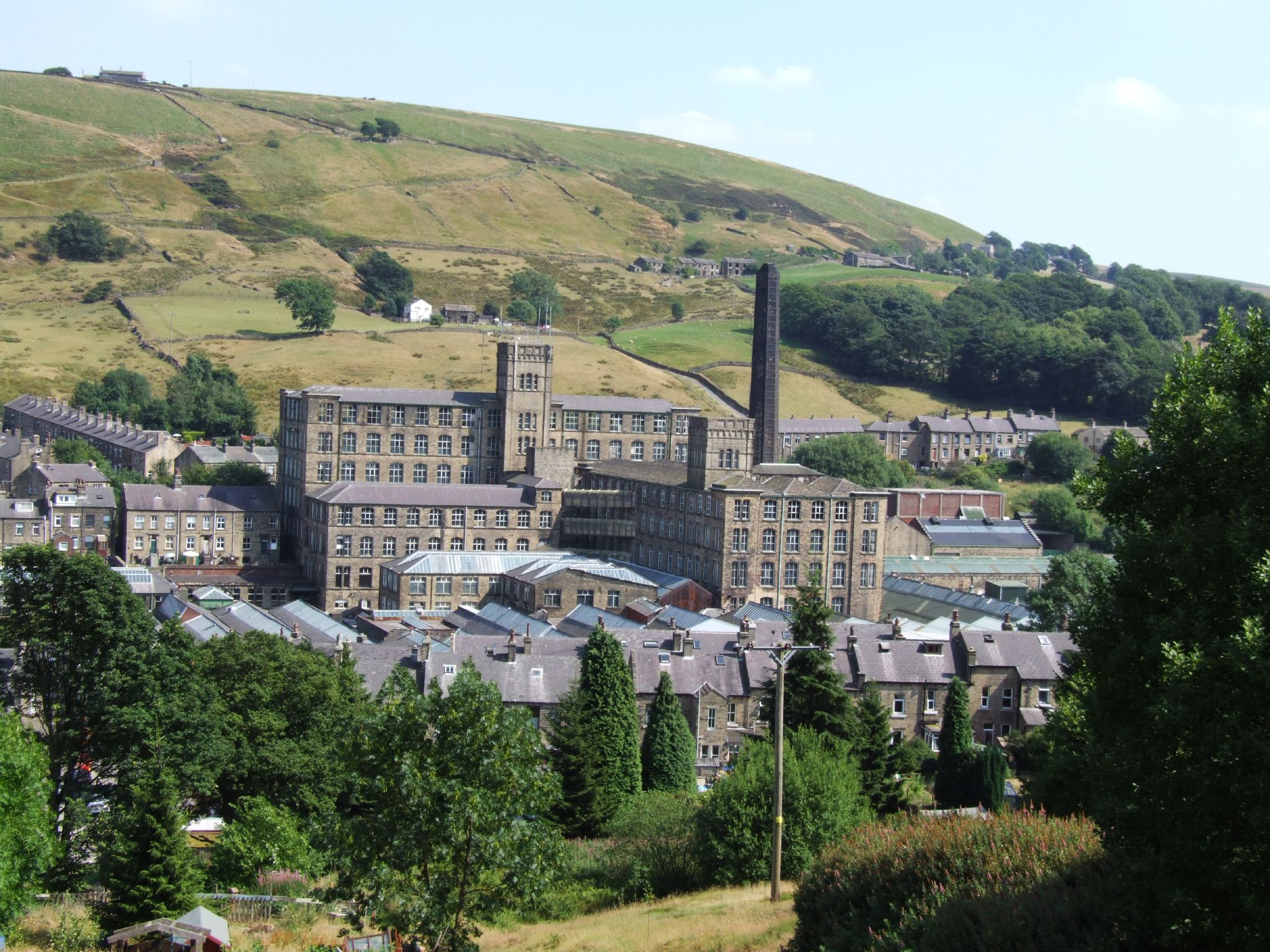
- Bank Bottom Mill
- Alternative names: Marsden Mill

General information
- Type: Industrial Textile Mill
- Architectural style: late Georgian
- Location: Marsden, West Yorkshire, England
- Coordinates: 53°35′48″N 1°55′46″W
- Construction started: Early 19th century
- Completed: 1824

Technical details
- Structural system: Brick

Bank Bottom Mill, later known as Marsden Mill, was from 1824 an important centre for the production of woollen cloth in Marsden, West Yorkshire, England. Originally a fulling mill, Bank Bottom Mill reached its heyday in the late nineteenth and early twentieth centuries under the ownership of the Crowther family, in particular John Edward Crowther, a businessman and philanthropist. However, the cloth industry declined in the late twentieth century, and production of woollen cloth finally ceased in 2003.

== History ==
=== 19th century ===
Bank Bottom Mill is a four storey structure which dates from 1824, and was originally a fulling mill. In the 1830s it was used by Norris, Sykes and Fisher. Later it was occupied by John Sykes and Sons.

In 1834 Norris, Sykes and Fisher participated in the report of the Factories Commissioners into the Employment of Children in Factories, and as to the Propriety and Means of Curtailing their Labour. According to the answers given by the firm to the Commissioners, the firm had commenced manufacture of woollen cloth in 1824, using water power driven by the river Wessenden. They employed a number of children in the mill, some below ten years of age. Boys and girls under ten were paid 3 shillings a week, about half what an adult might receive, and were "employed in piecing for slubbers and mules, and feeding scribbling and carding machines". A regular working week for all workers was sixty nine and a half hours, with days off on Sunday, Christmas Day and Good Friday, and "about six other half days during the year".

The firm was not enthusiastic about the prospect of legislation on the question of child labour:

"We are of the opinion that any legislative interference will prove prejudicial to both masters and workmen, more especially so where only water power is used. There exists no necessity whatever in the mills employed in manufacturing woollen cloths, and did we deem it needful to legislate on the subject, so difficult is the business, we should feel ourselves utterly at a loss how to act."

==== Crowthers ====
In the late 19th century Bank Bottom Mill was taken over by Joseph, William and Elon Crowther. Their company, John Crowther and Sons, was named after their late father John Crowther, who was a woollen manufacturer from Golcar, West Yorkshire. By this time the floor space of the mill was 57,592 square yards, and contained forty three sets of carding machines and six hundred and eighty looms in production in the early part of the twentieth century.

=== 20th century ===
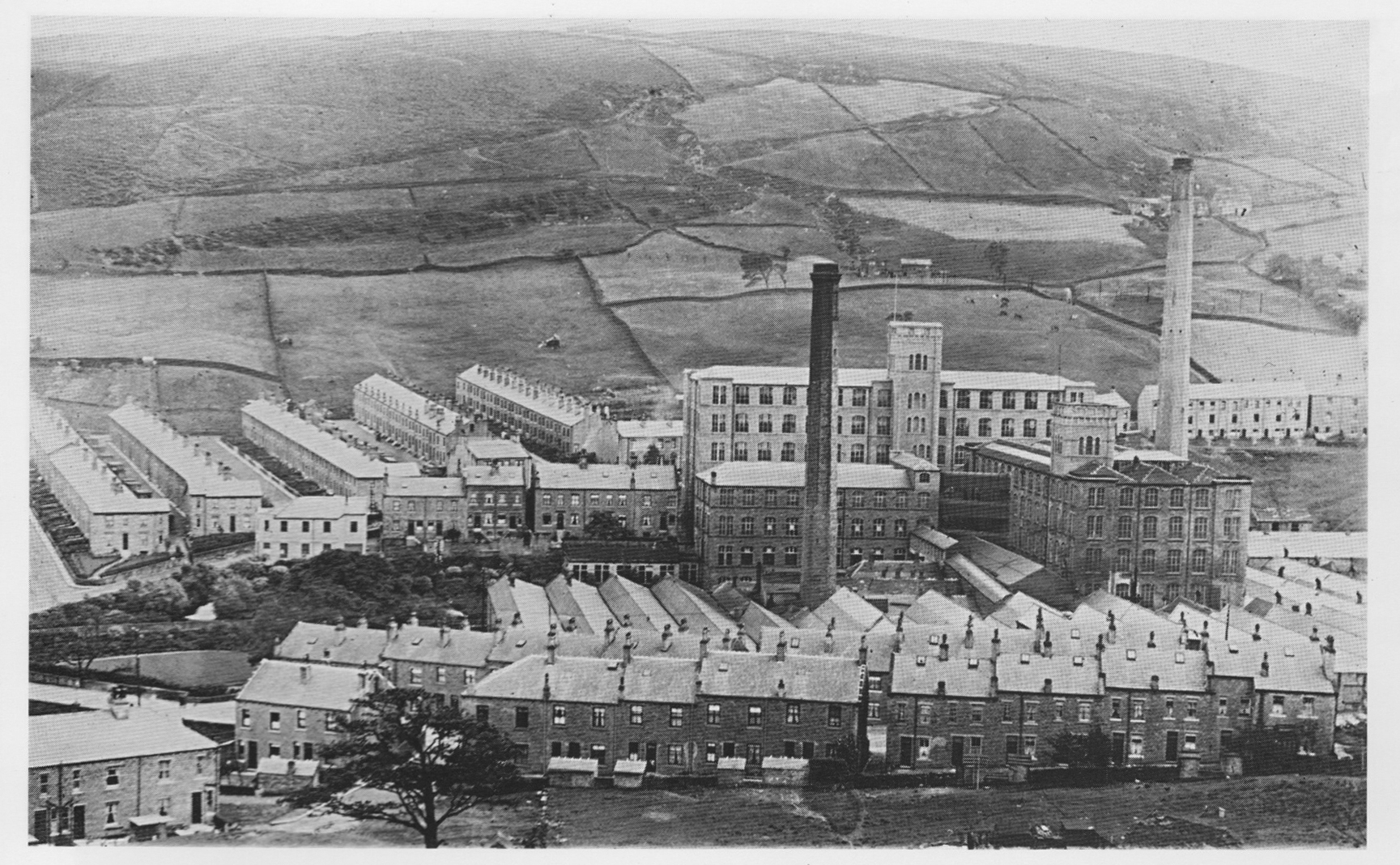
Bank Bottom Mill in its heyday, c. 1923

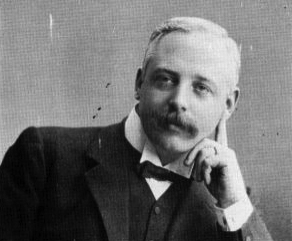
John Edward Crowther

At the start of the twentieth century, the smaller mills at Bank Bottom closed, gradually replaced by five bigger companies. These were: John Edward Crowther, New Mill (owned by Crowther Bruce and Co), Clough Lea Mill (owned by J. B. Robinson), Cellar’s Clough Mill (owned by Fisher, Firth & Co), and Holme Mills (owned by S, & C. Firth). Business boomed during the 1914-18 war, thanks to the huge demand for woollen cloth needed to clothe men in uniform. King George V and Queen Mary visited the mill on 30 May 1918, as a mark of appreciation of the contribution it was making to the continued war effort.

Conditions at Bank Bottom Mill were harsh by modern standards. Work began at 6.30am and a buzzer sounded, not just within the mill but across Marsden. If workers were not inside the mill by this time they would be locked out for the day, and no wages would be paid. Despite this, most workers were not in fact paid for the hours worked, but rather according to the amount of woollen cloth they produced, which had to be flawless. However, in others ways the mill was quite progressive, opening Bank Bottom Dining Room in 1905 to provide good quality canteen food at low prices.

The business was run by John Edward Crowther, a businessman and philanthropist who made a number of charitable donations to the village and people of Marsden. In 1931 the economic downturn caused by the Great Depression caused the mill to work short time, and on 4 July 1931 Crowther took his own life.

=== Decline and closure ===
By the late 20th and early 21st century the Yorkshire textile industry had fallen on hard times, textile production was cheaper in other countries and the demand for British wool and luxury fabrics was competitive and contracts were unreliable and sparse, Bank Bottom Mill closed in 2003, with the loss of 275 jobs. Towards the end, Crowther’s production at Bank Bottom ran blending, carding, spinning, twisting & dyeing. The manufacturing at Bank Bottom was a typical example of a modern day British textile mill, machines at the mill included Houget Duesberg Bosson HDB ring spinning frames, Thatham Carding engines and Broadbent centrifuge dye equipment. Bank Bottom was an impressive self contained business, only relying on New Mills, Marsden (another owned by Crowther) for any support if production was too heavy for the mill to handle.

== See also ==
- Hilton Crowther
- John Edward Crowther
