= Hilton Crowther =

John Hilton Crowther
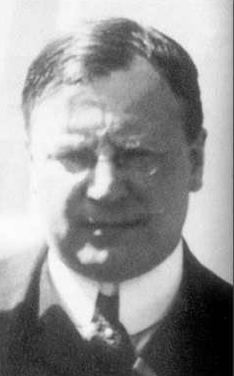
- Born: John Hilton Crowther; September 1879; Marsden, West Riding of Yorkshire, England
- Died: 24 March 1957 (aged 77); Blackpool
- Occupation: Businessman
- Spouses: Maud Evaleen Bowke (1884–1954) Married 22 June 1905 (Divorced); Annie Mona Jesse Vivian (1894–1971) Married in 1927 (Divorced)

John Hilton Crowther (1879–1957), known as J. Hilton Crowther, or more commonly simply as Hilton Crowther, was the chairman of Huddersfield Town and, subsequently, from 1919-1924, chairman of Leeds United football clubs. John Hilton Crowther was a wealthy woollen mill owner; along with his four brothers, he owned the Milnsbridge Woollen Mill in Huddersfield. In 1918 he invested a considerable sum in Huddersfield Town but the team did not prosper and Crowther was eventually bought out, focusing his energies thereafter on Leeds United.

== Early life ==
John Hilton Crowther was born in September 1879 in Marsden, West Riding of Yorkshire. He was the son of Joseph Stoner Crowther, a wealthy mill owner who had moved to Marsden from Golcar in 1867. John Hilton Crowther had a number of siblings including John Edward Crowther and David Stoner Crowther, both of whom became wealthy mill owners.

== Football career ==
=== Huddersfield Town ===
Crowther's interest in football was sparked by the distinct lack of public interest in Huddersfield Town. Since the club had achieved Football League status in 1910, their attendances had been extremely poor; up to the suspension of the League programme in 1915, home games had rarely exceeded crowds of 5,000. Contributing factors included Huddersfield's poor form – in five years of endeavour, the club's best position had been fifth in Division Two in 1912–13, and during this period they had never advanced beyond the second round of the FA Cup – and the presence of the established (and well supported) Huddersfield Northern Rugby Union Club. Playing a near-empty ground, which had been redeveloped to house over 50,000 spectators, could not have been encouraging for players, management or the club directors.

Sympathetic to the club's plight, and wealthy enough to indulge himself in practically any project he chose, Crowther invested £27,000 into the Huddersfield Football Club in 1918, then added a further £18,000 – a huge fortune in those days.

Such an act undoubtedly guaranteed Town's existence; however, in 1919 it was increasingly felt that the club should become self-sufficient, but lacked the support to achieve that state. Football League president John McKenna, cited Huddersfield's midweek home League fixture against Bury on 9 September 1919. The game realised only £49 in gate money, and McKenna said that such meagre support was not conducive to any club retaining Football League membership.

The crisis came to a head following the poor turn out for Huddersfield's 3–0 home win over Fulham in a Second Division match on 1 November 1919. An attendance of 2,500 paid just £90 at the turnstiles, whilst gate receipts at the rugby club in the same week banked £1,600. The club was simply not operating at a viable financial level.

=== Leeds City and Leeds United ===
At the same, Leeds City football club had been disbanded due to irregular financial payments to players, and its players were being auctioned off. There was a consistent fan base at Leeds, and a new football club – Leeds United – was formed with the long term aim of replacing the defunct Leeds City.

Impressed by the activity and support of the Leeds fans, Crowther (without consulting his fellow Huddersfield directors) offered to amalgamate Huddersfield Town with the newly formed Leeds United club. In the eyes of many, Leeds had been deprived of the chance to become one of the best centres of football in Yorkshire due to the misdemeanours of the disbanded club's officials, so a meeting with the United committee to discuss the possibilities of an amalgamation was welcomed in Leeds. The request for transference of Huddersfield Town to Leeds was duly sent to the Football League.

Within days of this news, a handful of Huddersfield spectators held a prolonged demonstration on the pitch in front of the directors box, demanding an explanation from the club's officials, and the Huddersfield Town board agreed to hold a further public meeting at Leeds Road the following day. A crowd of 3,000 supporters were drawn to the ground to protest at the proposed transference of their club and, encouraged by this, the Huddersfield board sent a counter request to the Football League.

The eventual ruling was that Huddersfield Town would be given one month's grace, until 8 December 1919, to raise £25,000, the sum of the debt deemed payable to Crowther. In return, he would forgo his interest in the club. If the money was not forthcoming, Huddersfield Town would move to Elland Road and become part of the new Leeds United.

The community and various local dignitaries rallied around and, after negotiations, Crowther accepted a final payment of £17,500 plus an allotment of 12,500 shares in Huddersfield Town. The club was saved from amalgamation with Leeds United. Thus, Crowther was bought out, and thereafter focused his energies on Leeds United.

Crowther had set his heart on building the new Leeds United, and he became the new club chairman, making the club a loan of £35,000, repayable when United gained promotion to the First Division.

He would serve as Chairman of Leeds United from 1919 to 1924.

== Personal life ==
In 1927 Crowther married Annie M. J. Vivian, known as Mona Vivian, a popular pantomime artiste, in St Martin-in-the-Fields in London. On Thursday 19 May “The Stage” newspaper reported that “The marriage took place on Monday at a registrars office in the West End of MONA VIVIAN and HILTON CROWTHER". The marriage was not a success and ended with a divorce settlement of around £1,000,000, an immense sum at that time. Crowther died 24 March 1957.

== See also ==
- John Edward Crowther
- Football in Yorkshire
- Sport in Leeds
