= Thomas Armstrong (writer) =

British writer (1899–1978)

- Born: 3 September 1899; Leeds, United Kingdom
- Died: 2 August 1978 (aged 78)
- Occupation: Novelist
- Spouse: Una Dulcie Bray
- Parent(s): Charles Plaxton; Alice Lily Armstrong

Thomas Armstrong (3 September 1899 – 2 August, 1978) was a Leeds-born novelist. He is best known for a series of popular novels set in Yorkshire, including the best-selling The Crowthers of Bankdam.

His parents were from mill-owning families. After attending Queen Elizabeth School, Wakefield, he studied at the Royal Naval College, Keyham, followed by service in the Royal Navy during the First World War. He married in 1930 and then began writing novels. He achieved success with the immediately popular The Crowthers of Bankdam that was soon made into a film (Master of Bankdam). The couple lived in Yorkshire, initially in the West Riding and then in Swaledale for 30 years. Throughout his life, he avoided personal publicity.

== Published works ==
- The Crowthers of Bankdam (1940) (Crowther Chronicles)
- Dover Harbour (1942)
- King Cotton (1947) (original handwritten manuscript held at Salford University)
- Adam Brunskill (1952)
- Pilling Always Pays (1954) (Crowther Chronicles)
- A Ring Has No End (1958)
- Sue Crowther's Marriage (1961) (Crowther Chronicles)
- The Face of the Madonna (1964)
- Our London Office (1966) (Crowther Chronicles).
