= Kirkheaton =

Village in West Yorkshire, England

Coordinates: 53.6552°N 1.7290°W

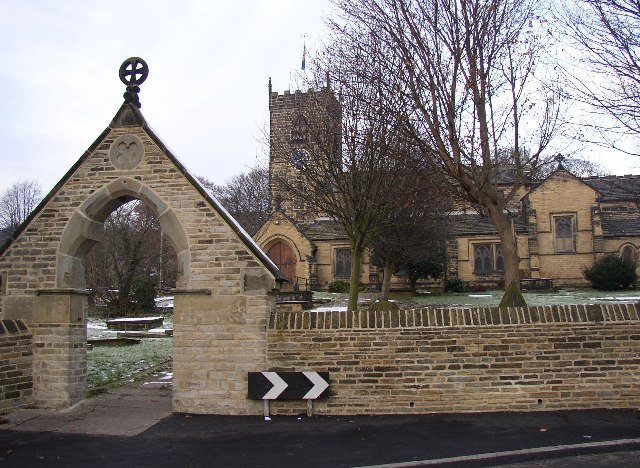
- St John's Church

- Location within West Yorkshire
- Area: 0.9657 km^{2} (0.3729 sq mi)
- Population: 3,496 (2021 census)
  - Density: 3,620/km^{2} (9,400/sq mi)
- Civil parish: Kirkburton
- Metropolitan borough: Kirklees
- Metropolitan county: West Yorkshire
- Region: Yorkshire and the Humber
- Country: England
- Sovereign state: United Kingdom
- Dialling code: 01484
- Police: West Yorkshire
- Fire: West Yorkshire
- Ambulance: Yorkshire
- UK Parliament: Spen Valley

Kirkheaton (English: /ˈkərkhiːtən/) is a village in the civil parish of Kirkburton, in the Kirklees district of West Yorkshire, England, Historically, it is part of the West Riding of Yorkshire. It is 3 miles (5 km) north-east of Huddersfield, in the Dalton ward of Kirklees Council. In 2021 it had a population of 3,496.

== History ==
The name Heaton comes from Old English "heah" meaning high and "tun" meaning settlement and the Old Norse "kirk" meaning church. In 1894 Kirkheaton became an urban district, on 1 April 1938 the district and parish were abolished and merged with Kirkburton Urban District. In 1931 the parish had a population of 2610.

== Religion ==
The parish church in Kirkheaton, dedicated to St John the Baptist, is one of the earliest churches in the area, there was a stone church on the site before the Norman Conquest. In the churchyard is a memorial to a disaster that shook the nation in 1818, a horrific fire in a local cotton mill, Colne Bridge Mill, in which 14 workers, all girls and many of them very young, were trapped and died.

See the 'External Links' below for a survey of burials and transcripts of the parish registers.

== Education ==
Kirkheaton Primary School is on New Road.

== Notable people ==
- England cricketers George Herbert Hirst, Allen Hill and Wilfred Rhodes were born in the village and played cricket for Kirkheaton Cricket Club. The cricketers, William Bates, John Thewlis Senior, and Lewis Wrathmell, were all born in the village and played for Yorkshire County Cricket Club.
- Richard Reed, Co-founder of Innocent Drinks.

== See also ==
- Listed buildings in Kirkburton
