= George Leonardos =

Greek author of historical novels (born 1937)

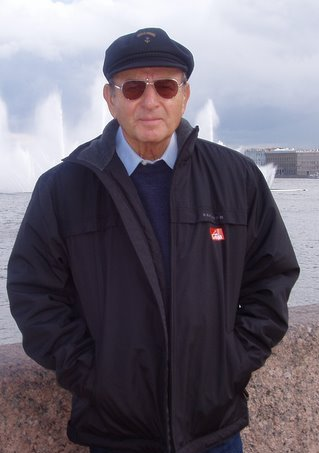
- Born: 20 February 1937 (age 88) Alexandria, Egypt
- Occupation: novelist, critic, journalist

George Leonardos (Greek: Γιώργος Λεονάρδος; born 1937) is a Greek author of historical novels.

== Early life ==
Son of Anastase and Maria, Leonardos was born in Alexandria, Egypt on 20 February 1937. His father died when he was two years old and he lived with his mother in Alexandria until 1954. He was an avid reader of fiction and history, and as a high school student in Alexandria had his short stories published in Tachydromos and Anatoli, the Greek daily newspapers of the city. In 1954 he moved to Greece to study physics at the Aristotle University of Thessaloniki.

== Career ==
After his graduation, he studied journalism and began to work as a journalist. He worked as a reporter for Athens newspapers Apogevmatini, Eleftherotypia, Mesimvrini, Eleftheros Typos, Ethnos and as a columnist in the financial paper Kerdos. He was the first correspondent of the Athens News Agency in Belgrade in 1964, and later in New York City in 1976, where he was also appointed director of the local Greek newspaper Ethnicos Kirikas. He has also worked as a newscaster in Greek Radio and Television, and has reported on the Vietnam War and the Persian Gulf war.

Leonardos is a member of the Athens Association of Daily Press Editors and the National Society of Greek Writers. His first novel, Grandma’s Red Sofa, was published in 1992. He was twice awarded the prize for best historical novel by the Greek Society of Christian Studies for his novels Mara, the Christian Sultana and Sleeping Beauty of Mystra. He was awarded a Botsis Foundation prize for his services to journalism and literature.

In 2008 he was awarded with the Greek State Prize for his historical trilogy The Palaeologian Dynasty. The Rise and Fall of Byzantium and specially for the third historical novel of the mentioned trilogy "The Last Palaeologue".

In 1980 he published the English-Greek Dictionary of Scientific and Military Terms, and in 2000 he published The Structure of the Novel. His latest historical novel is Sophia Paleologue Palaelogina – From Byzantium to Russia.

== Works ==
=== Novels ===
- Grandmam's red sofa, 1992
- The house over the catacombs, 1993
- Eva, 1994
- The magnet poles, 1995
- Earth's lovers, 1996
- A song from the soul, 1997

=== Historical novels ===
- Barbarossa the Pirate, 1998
- Mara, the Christian Sultana, 1999
- Maria Magdalene, 2001
- Sleeping Beauty of Mystra, 2002
- Michael VIII Palaeologue, 2004
- The Palaeologues, 2006
- The last Palaeologue, 2007.
- Sophia Paleologue – From Byzantium to Russia, 2008
- Magellan, 2009
- Thule 2010
- The Alexandria Rhapsody 2011
- The Last Sip of Wine 2013
- Islands Forgotten by the Time - Don Teodoro Griego, 2014
- Justinian ii;-The slit-nosed, 2016
- The Sarantapichena;- The story of Irene the Athenian, 2016
