= Colne Bridge =

Grade II listed bridge in the United kingdom

- A Colne Bridge was mentioned in the Fountains Abbey records of the 12th century.
- Coordinates: 53°40′39″N 1°44′00″W
- Carries: B6118
- Crosses: River Colne
- Locale: Colne Bridge, West Yorkshire
- Heritage status: Grade II listed structure

Characteristics
- Design: Arch
- No. of spans: 2

History
- Opened: 18th Century

Statistics
- Toll: No

Colne Bridge (English: /ˈkoʊln/) is an historic 18th-century bridge near Huddersfield, West Yorkshire, England. A Grade II listed stone-built arch bridge, it spans the River Colne between Bradley and Kirkheaton. A Colne Bridge was mentioned in the Fountains Abbey records of the 12th century. It gave its name to a village, and also to Colne Bridge Mill which was destroyed by fire in 1818.

According to Ted Ruddock, Colne Bridge may have been the design inspiration for John Smeaton's work on the Blackfriars Bridge.
