= Palaiologan Dynasty (novel series) =

Palaiologan Dynasty (Greek: Παλαιολόγεια Δυναστεία) is the collective name given to a trilogy of historical novels on the Palaiologan dynasty, the last ruling house of the Byzantine Empire, written by Greek author George Leonardos. Leonardos received the Greek State Literature Award in 2008 for the final book in the series. The trilogy is wrapped up with another novel, Sophia Palaiologina. From Byzantium to Russia, which refers to a princess of the Palaiologos family, who was married to Ivan III of Russia.

== Michael VIII Palaiologos – The Liberator ==
The imperial flag with the arms of the Palaiologan dynasty.

It is a fictional biography of Michael VIII Palaiologos, opening at the beginning of the Palaiologos dynasty.

The story begins with the Fourth Crusade and traces Michael VIII's rise to power, how he installed himself as the regent for eight-year-old emperor John IV, and then ordered him blinded and relegated to a monastery, clearing a path to the imperial throne. The novel ends with the Sicilian Vespers, fomented, indirectly yet actively, by Michael VIII. Between those events stand the battle of Pelagonia and the re-taking of Constantinople by Michael VIII's general Alexios Strategopoulos.

== The Palaiologoi ==
Emblem of the Palaiologos dynasty. The double-headed eagle with the sympilema, the most recognized emblem of the Palaiologos.

In the second novel, Leonardos describes the civil wars among the Palaiologos which greatly weakened the Byzantine state.

The book is, in some ways, a sequel to Michael Palaiologos – The Liberator.

== The Last Palaiologos ==
In this last part of his Palaiologos dynasty trilogy, Leonardos writes about the last Emperor of Byzantium, Constantine XI Palaiologos and the fall of Constantinople.

Using Venetian, Greek and Turkish sources, Leonardos has created an account of the last days of the Eastern Roman Empire, the new Rome.

== Sophia Palaiologina ==
Leonardos talks of the bonds between Greece and Russia. From Greek Mystras to Catholic Rome, and from there to medieval Moscow, the life of Zoe-Sophia Palaiologina traces the collapse of one civilisation and the rise of a new one. Heir to the imperial titles of the Second Rome, vanquished Constantinople, the daring Byzantine princess managed to escape Rome and, as the wife of Ivan III, create the Third Rome from the emerging Russian Empire. The first Tsarina in Russian history, the avowed enemy of the Tatars who had Russian lands under their rule, comes alive in the pages of his new historical novel by George Leonardos, and sheds light on aspects of history that are not widely known. Historical scholarship, a thrilling adventure, a reminder of the true power of Orthodoxy and of Russia, in a plot that thunders forward like a juggernaut. The novel depicts the developing relations between the Byzantine Empire and the Grand Duchy of Moscow. The bonds strengthened after the marriage of Zoe-Sophia Palaiologos, niece of the last Byzantine Emperor, Constantine XI Palaiologos who fell defending the City against the Ottoman army, to Ivan III the Great, himself a descendant of the Rurik Dynasty. With the help and at the instigation of his Greek consort, Ivan III managed to reject Tatar rule and unite the fragmented principalities and hegemonies under a large, and powerful central leadership, the predecessor to today’s Russia. Because of his marriage to Sophia Palaiologos, the sole heir to the Byzantine Empire, he also succeeded in making his state the heir to the vanquished and fragmented Eastern Roman Empire, and thus adopted the Empire’s symbols, such as the double-headed eagle, and also became a power in the Orthodox world, declaring Moscow the Third Rome, after Rome itself and Constantinople. The novel begins in Rome where Zoe Palaiologina was raised and describes the machinations of the Greek Orthodox and later Catholic Cardinal Bessarion and a series of Popes, the last of whom was Sixtus IV, to marry Zoe off to Ivan III, then Grand Duke of Moscow, so that she could convert the Russians to Catholicism. As soon as she planted her feet on Russian soil, Sophia’s Byzantine Orthodoxy awoke and she changed her name to Sophia, as the Russians considered the name Zoe to be Catholic. At Sophia’s instigation – she often nagged him that she had not “married to become a vassal of the Tatar infidels” – Ivan managed to overthrow Tatar hegemony over the Russian people, particularly after the bloodless confrontation in the Ugra River, and make his domains a powerful state. It was for this reason, as well as his patriotism and policies that Ivan III was proclaimed ‘the Great’, the first in Russian history. Ivan’s and Sophia’s grandson was Ivan the Terrible.
