= King Cotton (novel) =

1947 novel

- First edition
- Author: Thomas Armstrong
- Cover artist: G.W.L.
- Language: English
- Genre: Historical drama
- Publisher: William Collins, Sons
- Publication date: 1947
- Publication place: United Kingdom
- Media type: Print
- Pages: 928

King Cotton is a 1947 historical novel by the British writer Thomas Armstrong. It focuses on Lancashire in the 1850s and 1860s and the cotton mills that turned raw cotton imported from the American South into textiles. It takes its title from the slogan of King Cotton a popular boast about the economic power that the lucrative crop gave to the southerners in their dispute with the North.

The novel portrays the hardships caused to the mill communities of northern England, by the Union Blockade during the American Civil War preventing supplies of cotton from reaching Liverpool. Despite their difficulties there is broad support amongst the workers for the Abolitionist cause.

== Bibliography ==
- Knight, Rolf. Traces of Magma: An Annotated Bibliography of Left Literature. Draegerman, 1983
- Russell, Dave. Looking North: Northern England and the National Imagination. Manchester University Press, 2004.
- Snell, Keith. The Bibliography of Regional Fiction in Britain and Ireland, 1800–2000. Routledge, 2017.
- Turner, Herbert. Trade Union Growth, Structure and Policy: A Comparative Study of the Cotton Unions. University of Toronto Press, 1962.
