= Colne Bridge Mill =

Former mill in West Yorkshire, England

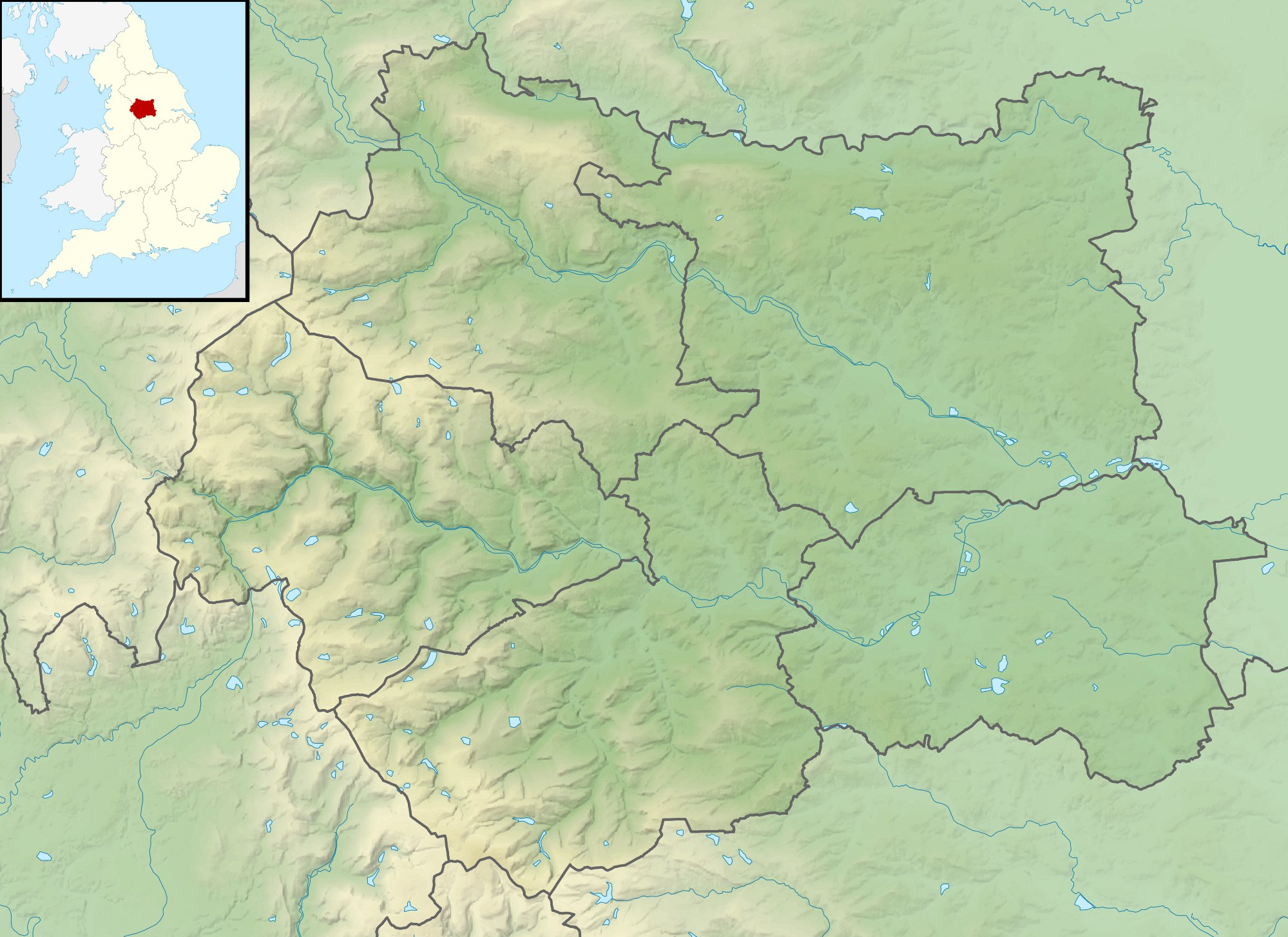
- Location within West Yorkshire
- 53°40′44″N 1°44′00″W
- Type: Factory
- Location: Colne Bridge, West Yorkshire

History
- Built: 1775
- Demolished: 14 February 1818

Site notes
- Owner: Thomas Atkinson (1779–1838)

Colne Bridge Mill (English: /ˈkoʊln/) was a factory, built in 1775, in the village of Colne Bridge near Bradley and Kirkheaton, Huddersfield, West Yorkshire, England, which was destroyed by fire on 14 February 1818. It was owned by the wealthy manufacturer Thomas Atkinson (1779–1838), who was also proprietor of another business at Bradley Mills, Huddersfield.

== Fire of 1818 ==
Early in the morning of 14 February 1818, around 5 am, a fire was started when a 10-year-old boy, James Thornton (c. 1808–55), was sent down into the mill's carding room with a naked candle. The flame ignited huge amounts of flammable material. Many workers were trapped on the mill's upper floors. As they tried to escape and attempts were made to rescue them, the mill's floors and roof collapsed.

Twenty-six women and girls aged between nine and 18 working through the night, and of these 17 were killed. The inquest found that the deaths were accidental, and no one was prosecuted. The bodies were in such a mutilated state that they were unidentifiable, and 15 bodies that were recovered were buried in a communal grave at Kirkheaton Parish Church on 16 February 1818.

== Impact and memorial ==
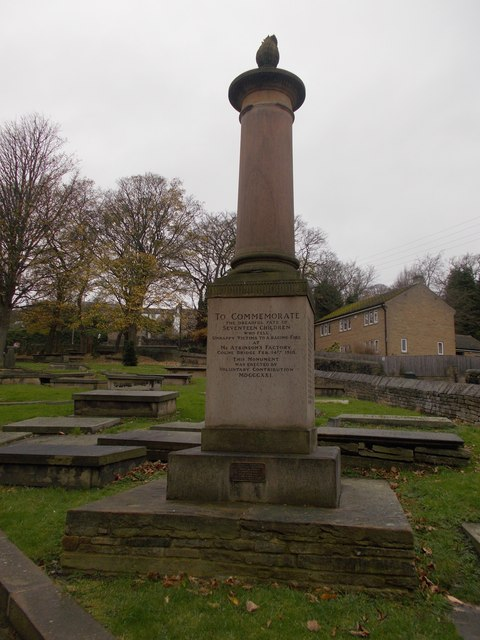
The monument to the victims, erected in 1821 in Kirkheaton churchyard

The tragedy led to questions about factory conditions being raised in Parliament contributing to the movement for improved working conditions. Nine days after the fire, Sir Robert Peel the Elder moved the second reading of his Factory Bill in the House of Commons that aimed to prevent a recurrence of 'that which has lately taken place at Colne Bridge'. The Bill was enacted as the Cotton Mills and Factories Act 1819.

In 1821, a memorial to the victims of the fire was erected, by voluntary subscription in Kirkheaton Churchyard. It was restored in 1986 to mark the centenary of the Trades Union Congress.

In 2018, events were held to commemorate the tragedy's bicentenary, including a memorial service at Kirkheaton Parish Church on 10 February 2018, and a plaque was unveiled in remembrance of those lives lost.
