= Walking Home: Travels with a Troubadour on the Pennine Way =

2012 book by Simon Armitage

- Cover of first edition
- Author: Simon Armitage
- Cover artist: Design by Faber, photograph by Simon Armitage
- Genre: Travel
- Set in: The Pennines, England
- Publisher: Faber and Faber
- Publication date: 2012
- Media type: Print
- Pages: 285 (paperback)
- ISBN: 978-0-571-24988-6
- OCLC: 779244536
- Followed by: Walking Away : Further Travels with a Troubadour on the South West Coast Path (2015)

Walking Home: Travels with a Troubadour on the Pennine Way is a 2012 non-fiction book by the Yorkshire poet Simon Armitage. It chronicles his attempt to walk the long-distance trail the opposite way to that usually taken, from north to south. Along the way, he takes no money, stays with strangers, and gives poetry readings to pay his expenses. The book is illustrated with Armitage's photographs taken along the route. Two of his poems are included in the chapters about the places the poems describe.

The book was warmly received by critics in British newspapers. They noted that it fits into the tradition of slightly eccentric mid-life journeys, as well as of the productive effect of walking on poetry. They enjoyed the humorous accounts of British interiors and of hazards including weird fogs, bulls, blisters, clogging mud, and a university friend who pops up and cadges free board and lodging.

== Context ==
Simon Armitage is an English poet, playwright and novelist. He was appointed as Poet Laureate of the United Kingdom in 2019. He is professor of poetry at the University of Leeds and became Oxford Professor of Poetry when he was elected to the four-year part-time appointment from 2015 to 2019. He was born and raised in Marsden, West Yorkshire, a village on the Pennine Way near its southern end, and still lives nearby.

== Book ==
=== Publication history ===
Walking Home: Travels with a Troubadour on the Pennine Way was published in hardback by Faber and Faber in 2012. They produced a paperback edition in 2013.

=== Synopsis ===
The book chronicles Armitage's walk along the Pennine Way from its usual end-point, Kirk Yetholm, at its northern end in Scotland, southwards to his home village of Marsden and onwards into the Peak District. He starts out in troubadour style with no money, intending to live by his poetry alone, but having publicised his intentions and solicited offers of accommodation. These were efficiently organised by his friend and fellow poet Caroline Hawkridge with "enthusiasm, optimism, and managerial panache". Along the way, he stays with strangers each night, who provide food and accommodation, and at each stopping-point he gives a poetry reading, which is free to enter but with a closing collection to pay his expenses.

=== Poetry ===
I feel I am at the end of my tether
and don't want to go on any longer.
Not like those climbers on Malham Cove —
dipping backwards for their bags of powder,
reaching upwards for the next hairline fracture,
hauling themselves from my binoculars.

— Simon Armitage, First lines of poem in Walking Home, "Horton in Ribblesdale to Malham"

The "Horton-in-Ribblesdale to Malham" and the "Ickornshaw to Hebden Bridge" chapters each end with one of Armitage's poems about the places named. The poem "I feel I am at the end of my tether", about watching climbers on the Malham limestone, was originally published in his 1993 Book of Matches. The poem "Above Ickornshaw, black huts" was later published in Armitage's 2019 Sandettie Light Vessel Automatic, with three other poems in that book's chapter "Walking Home".

=== Structure and illustrations ===
Apart from the opening chapters, each chapter describes a section of the route, and has as its title the name of the section, such as "Uswayford to Byrness"; this is followed by the distance walked in miles, the Ordnance Survey map used, and the date. Each chapter is illustrated with a small number of whole-page photographs by Armitage, printed in monochrome, showing details of buildings, interiors, landscapes, or aspects of the walk.

== Reception ==
Having charmed his way into an evening meal, including an individually cooked vegetarian alternative and a bottle of real ale to wash it down with, Slug is now on the point of being offered a bed for the night. Judging by the way the question of sleeping arrangements is tentatively broached I sense there has been a little bit of behind-the-scenes discussion as to the exact nature of our relationship, not helped by Slug's mischievous references to his many friends in Brighton and his appearance at the dinner table in a pink floral shirt, and eventually I intervene by saying that single rooms would be much appreciated and I get first use of any shared bathroom and toilet facility.

— Simon Armitage, Walking Home, "Horton in Ribblesdale to Malham"

The poet Adam Thorpe, reviewing the book in The Guardian, notes that poets from the "indefatigable" William Wordsworth have walked productively, and that walkers have written entertaining tales of their hikes since Karl Philipp Moritz's "wonderfully entertaining" Travels in England, describing his walk from London to Derbyshire in 1782. Thorpe comments that all the elements of the genre were in that book, and all remain present in Armitage's humorous account, including elation/exhaustion, blisters, rain, bulls, views, the kindness of strangers, and getting lost. Thorpe comments that "When Slug, a chaotic university friend, unexpectedly turns up and cadges free board and lodging, Armitage's inner groans are barely perceptible; he leaves them for us to tune into, which makes Slug's presence even more delightful."

Jane Shilling, reviewing the book in The Daily Telegraph, describes Armitage as a latter-day Odysseus on his wandering journey through many obstacles and strange meetings. She finds that Armitage has the rare gift of being able to make her laugh out loud, but comments that "it is in its moments of doubt, anxiety, cowardice and black misery that his book is at its most touchingly human."

Country Life finds the book "as likeable as the poet himself, funny, curious and tenderly observed."

The Pennine Way, with Armitage's stops, not all directly on the route

Emma Townshend, in The Independent, writes that the British "love a man on a slightly eccentric mid-life journey", and that Armitage's idea of turning "properly troubadour" by attempting the Pennine Way without taking any money with him fitted into the "classic unnecessary journey genre", containing for instance Dave Gorman trying to meet all the other Dave Gormans, and Michael Palin's much-loved wanderings. Townshend enjoyed his descriptions of the "British B&B dressing table .. here in all its glory, with mini-kettle, individually wrapped shortbread biscuits and laminated sign", along with the huge Northumberland skies and clagging mud. She notes that he survives "weird dropping fogs, misdirections, bizarre sleeping accommodations, savage dogs and angry farmers", even if the reader does not quite feel he was alone, given how many people were cheering him along.

In The Sunday Times, the novelist Christopher Hart calls Armitage "an agreeably droll travel writer". Hart comments that Armitage is "modest about slipping his own poems into the text, but when he does they're an additional treat."

Suzi Feay, writing in the Financial Times, remarks that Armitage is surprisingly relaxed with his use of words and clichés, as she is sure he knows better. All the same, she writes, there are "flashes of imagery to cherish", such as when a path "fragments into half a dozen vague and wispy sheep trails, like the frayed end of a rope".

== Bibliography ==
- Armitage, Simon (2012). Walking Home: Travels with a Troubadour on the Pennine Way. London: Faber and Faber. ISBN 978-0-571-24988-6. OCLC 779244536.
