= Book of Matches =

Collection of poems by Simon Armitage

- Cover of first edition
- Author: Simon Armitage
- Language: English
- Subject: Poetry
- Publisher: Faber and Faber
- Publication date: 11 October 1993
- Publication place: United Kingdom
- Media type: Paperback
- Pages: 64
- ISBN: 978-0-571-16982-5
- Dewey Decimal: 821/.914 20
- LC Class: PR6051.R564 B66 1993
- Preceded by: Kid
- Followed by: Dead Sea Poems

Book of Matches is a poetry book written by Simon Armitage, first published in 1993 by Faber and Faber. It was admired by critics and has been used in English literature examinations.

== Author ==
Simon Armitage is an English poet, playwright and novelist. He was appointed as Poet Laureate of the United Kingdom in 2019. He is professor of poetry at the University of Leeds and became Oxford Professor of Poetry when he was elected to the four-year part-time appointment from 2015 to 2019. He was born and raised in Marsden, West Yorkshire. At the start of his career, and at the time Book of Matches was published, he was working as a probation officer.

== Book ==
=== Publication history ===
Book of Matches was published in paperback by Faber and Faber in 1993. They reprinted it in 2001.

=== Contents ===
The book is written in three sections, the first (Book of Matches) containing 30 fourteen-line poems or sonnets. Each is meant to be read within the time it would take for a match to be lit and burn out, as Armitage states in the first poem, "My party piece:"

I strike, then from the moment when the matchstick
conjures up its light, to when the brightness moves
beyond its means, and dies, I say the story
of my life —

— from Book of Matches, "My party piece:"

The second, Becoming of Age, contains 14 titled poems, including "Penelope", alluding to the wife who waits for the return of Odysseus to Ithaca, and "The Lost Letter of the Late Jud Fry", alluding to the dirty-fingernailed farmhand character in the Rodgers and Hammerstein musical Oklahoma!.

The third, Reading the Banns, contains 12 untitled poems based on a wedding theme, titled for the banns of marriage; critics have detected echoes of W. H. Auden in its lines.

== Reception ==
The London Magazine welcomed Book of Matches as powerfully written with a distinctive approach. It cited the fifth poem in the initial "Book of Matches" section as characterising Armitage's approach: describing the act of skimming stones on a lake, it admires his use of metaphor in

Pull!
Keep low. Follow through but leave the trailing arm
and lend that stone a certain r.p.m. of spin

so it kicks, sits up at the taste of water.

— from Book of Matches, "I am able to keep my mind steadily"

Elspeth Barker in The Independent, admired the book, writing that "His virtuosity with form and metre has always been remarkable; here it is breakthtaking." She noted that Armitage's persona had changed from his earlier collections, "quit[ting] his Northern Ladding and grown up." His style had changed, too: "a morning suit is a big improvement on an anorak". In Barker's view, "the finest and angriest poem in the book" is To Poverty, subtitled "After Laycock", the 19th century poet Samuel Laycock who was, like Armitage, born in Marsden. She describes it as "a raging indictment with a grim conclusion".

Ronald Carter, writing in 2001 in The Routledge History of Literature in English, called the book Armitage's "most distinctive volume". Daniel McGuiness, in The Antioch Review, thought Armitage the best of a new generation of young British poets, writing that "somehow this book has been written by the love child of Philip Larkin and Elizabeth Bishop."

The London Review of Books printed three of poems, Penelope, On the Trail of the Old Ways, and The Lost Letter of the Late Jud Fry, on 22 July 1993, before the collection appeared in print. Several poems from the book have been studied as part of the GCSE English Literature examination in the UK.

The poet and novelist Ruth Padel described Book of Matches as a punning title, meaning both the means to light fires and "matters matrimonial", with an "anoraky obsession with series". She found the series of wedding poems banal, commenting that praise for the book had come mainly from non-poets.

== Bibliography ==
- Armitage, Simon (1993). Book of Matches. London: Faber and Faber. ISBN 978-0-571-16982-5. OCLC 29509405.
