= Kid (poetry collection) =

Collection of poems by Simon Armitage

- Cover of first edition
- Author: Simon Armitage
- Genre: Poetry
- Publisher: Faber and Faber
- Publication date: 1992
- Media type: Paperback
- Awards: Forward Prize for Poetry
- ISBN: 978-0571166077
- OCLC: 919570527
- Preceded by: Zoom!
- Followed by: Book of Matches
- Website: https://www.simonarmitage.com/kid/

Kid is the second collection of poems by Simon Armitage, published in 1992. The book won a Forward Prize for Poetry.

== Author ==
Simon Armitage is an English poet, playwright and novelist. He was appointed as Poet Laureate of the United Kingdom in 2019. He is professor of poetry at the University of Leeds and became Oxford Professor of Poetry when he was elected to the four-year part-time appointment from 2015 to 2019. He was born and raised in Marsden, West Yorkshire. At the start of his career, and at the time Kid was published, he was working as a probation officer.

== Book ==
=== Publication history ===
Kid, Armitage's second book of poetry, was his first to be published by Faber and Faber, in 1992.

=== Contents ===
The 48 poems in the collection, structured as a single list, include:

- "Kid" – the title poem, this is spoken by Batman's companion Robin.
- "Brassneck" – the story of two thieves attempting to steal from a crowd at a football game.
- "At Sea"
- "Robinson's Resignation" – the story of a businessman.
- "Great Sporting Moments: The Treble" – an exploration of class conflict.

== Reception ==
The collection was described by the poet and novelist Ruth Padel as being "Very Yorkshire; very Simon Armitage". She wrote that the book "consolidated his name for technical virtuosity [and] black humour", the voice having "a self-deprecatingly cocky self-centredness." In her view, the first poem, "Brassneck", about a murderer, had "brilliant rhyme"; but she noted that some, especially poets, "found it less convincing than Zoom!."

The book won a Forward Prize for Poetry in the "best first collection" category in 1992, the first year in which the prizes were awarded.

== Bibliography ==
- Armitage, Simon (1992). Kid. London: Faber and Faber. ISBN 978-0-571-16607-7. OCLC 26530490.
