= Zoom! (poetry book) =

2020 poetry book by Simon Armitage

- Cover of first edition
- Author: Simon Armitage
- Genre: Poetry
- Publisher: Bloodaxe Books
- Publication date: 1989
- Media type: Paperback
- Pages: 80
- Awards: Poetry Book Society Choice
- ISBN: 978-1-85224-078-3
- OCLC: 21872787
- Followed by: Kid
- Website: https://www.simonarmitage.com/zoom/

Zoom! is a 1989 book of poetry by the British poet Simon Armitage, and his first full-length collection. It was selected as a Poetry Book Society Choice, shortlisted for the Whitbread Poetry Award, and was made the PBS Autumn choice.

The book has been welcomed by critics, who have noted its variety of literary devices including alliteration, assonance, enjambment, and imagery. They have admired his witty understated style and use of real-life speech to examine ordinary life in West Yorkshire.

== Author ==
Simon Armitage is an English poet, playwright and novelist. He was appointed as Poet Laureate of the United Kingdom in 2019. He is professor of poetry at the University of Leeds and became Oxford Professor of Poetry when he was elected to the four-year part-time appointment from 2015 to 2019. He was born and raised in Marsden, West Yorkshire. At the start of his career, and at the time Zoom!, his first full-length poetry collection, was published, he was working as a probation officer. He gained the confidence to submit his poetry to magazines through weekly poetry workshops run by the poet Peter Sansom at Huddersfield Polytechnic (as it then was). Looking back on the work he did in that period, Armitage comments that "the writing was just for fun", and that Sansom was "a guru figure for me".

== Book ==
=== Publication history ===
Zoom! was published in 1989 as a paperback by Bloodaxe Books in Hexham, Northumberland. Many of the collected poems were first published in three of Armitage's pamphlets, namely the 1986 Human Geography, the 1987 The Distance Between Stars and the 1987 The Walking Horses. It was reprinted in 2002, and translated into German as Zoom! Gedichte in 2011.

=== Synopsis ===
Out of the melting pot, into the mint;
next news I was loose change for a Leeds pimp,
burning a hole in his skin-tight pocket
till he tipped a busker by the precinct.

Not the most ceremonious release
for a fresh faced coin cutting its teeth.
But that's my point: if you're poorly bartered
you're scuppered before you've even started.

— Simon Armitage, from "Ten Pence Story", in Zoom!

Zoom! is a collection of 61 poems, 49 of them less than a page in length. They are grouped in a single list. There is no introduction, and there are no illustrations.

== Awards ==
The book was selected as a Poetry Book Society Choice. It was shortlisted for the Whitbread Poetry Award. It was also the PBS Autumn choice; John Harvey of Slow Dancer, which published some of Armitage's works including The Walking Horses in 1988, commented that "this kind of success is not so much rare as unheard of."

== Analysis ==
Sarah Crown, writing in The Guardian, comments that "Snow Joke", the first poem in the collection, at once set up his style with its opening line "Heard the one about the guy from Heaton Mersey?" Crown describes the poem as playing out a classic Armitage psychodrama, as a hubristic middle-aged married man, complete with mistress in another town, is found dead in his car, having ignored police warnings and driven through the snow. She admires the poem's ending, with its "final, ethereal image of the car buried in snow, its 'horn, moaning / softly like an alarm clock under an eiderdown'". In her view, comparing Armitage to Philip Larkin, this elevates the poem from its humdrum setting "to ethereal heights with a well-placed phrase".

The critic and scholar of English literature Oliver Tearle, analysing the poem "Poem" in the collection under the subtitle "A reading of one of his best poems", calls everything about it understated, including its title. He notes that it begins with "And", as if it was part of something else, and that each line ends unexpressively with a full stop. In terms of content, he states, the poem is an obituary, speaking about and explicitly rating a man in the past tense. The poem names the good things he did, and three times mentions his "darker and less pleasant" side, occasionally being angry and violent. In Tearle's view, Armitage invites the reader to see the man as an average person, "a decent enough sort", with the implication that "nobody is outright good" or bad. The poem has fourteen lines, and its structure as three quatrains and a rhymed couplet suggest that it is a sonnet. However, Tearle writes, Armitage's rhyming structure is innovative, so that in the first two ABAB couplets, the rhymes could almost be AAAA, all four lines ending with an assonant syllable containing long "I" vowel; and so on throughout. This has the effect, Tearle suggests, of mixing up and aligning the man's good and bad deeds, implying moral complexity in the actions of everyman.

Emma Baldwin writes on Poem Analysis that the title poem, Zoom!, which appears last in the book, makes use of a variety of literary devices including alliteration, enjambment, and imagery. The poem is in free verse but has structure, each couplet consisting of a long line and a much shorter line, in Baldwin's view forcing the reader to move their eyes rapidly from side to side, creating a rapid pace.

== Reception ==
Poetry critics have stated that Zoom! marked Armitage as an exciting new voice in English poetry, and gained him wide critical acclaim. Jo Livingstone, in The New Yorker, calls Armitage "a decidedly modern poet", citing the collection's title, albeit "one who is known for his accessibility and his respect for the performative aspect of poetry." Crown describes Armitage's style in the book as "Northern and vernacular, dramatic and jaggedly witty".

The poet and novelist Ruth Padel writes in The Independent that the book "made real-life speech and activity the centre of a tungsten-tough poetry of deadpan flair and casual, leave-it-there humour. The cleverness was in the angle. Armitage wrote about grow-bags, walk-in wardrobes, brake-fluid, cashing the Giro, dumping granny at the old people's home."

Recalling the period when he was writing Zoom!, Armitage stated that he had no realistic expectation of being published, so writing poetry was "just for fun", something that is inevitably lost after becoming "an 'author'". He quoted a "blurb writer" who wrote that "Zoom! rocketed [Armitage] to poetic stardom", noting that he was still working in probation four years later. Stating that the book was "never intended as a manifesto", he writes that what Zoom! actually achieved was to magnify everyday life in semi-rural West Yorkshire, the twenty-something Armitage "trying to articulate inner landscapes against a backdrop of knackered industries and sweeping moors, using a language and dialect passed down through generations but spiked with the vernacular of postmodernism and post-punk."

== Bibliography ==
- Armitage, Simon (1989). Zoom!. Hexham: Bloodaxe Books. ISBN 978-1-85224-078-3. OCLC 21872787.
