= Magnetic field (disambiguation) =

A magnetic field is a physical field that describes the magnetic influence on moving electric charges, electric currents, and magnetic materials.

Magnetic field or Magnetic Fields may also refer to:

== Specific magnetic fields ==
- Earth's magnetic field
- Magnetic field of Mars
- Magnetic field of the Moon
- Stellar magnetic field

== Arts and entertainment ==
- Les Champs magnétiques ('The Magnetic Fields'), a 1920 surrealist novel by André Breton and Philippe Soupault
- Les Chants Magnétiques (English title: Magnetic Fields, literally 'Magnetic Songs'), a 1981 album by Jean-Michel Jarre
- The Magnetic Fields, an American indie pop band
- "Magnetic Field", a song by Lights from the 2017 album Skin & Earth
- Magnetic Field Remixes, a 1994 compilation album by Chemlab
- Magnetic Field: The Marsden Poems, a 2020 collection of poems by Simon Armitage
- Magnetic Fields (film), a 2021 Greek road movie

== Other uses ==
- Magnetic Fields (video game developer), a British company

== See also ==
- Magnetosphere, a region of space surrounding an astronomical object in which charged particles are affected by that object's magnetic field
- Electromagnetic field
