= Melanie Plimmer =

British barrister

Melanie Plimmer is a British barrister and Diversity and Community Relations Judge (DCRJ) in the Upper Tribunal Immigration and Asylum Chamber (Manchester and London). She was formerly a member of Garden Court North Chambers and then of Kings Chambers. In 2006 The Times named her as "Lawyer of the Week" for her work in the case of an Iranian woman claiming refugee status. She has specialised in immigration and prison law and has taught training sessions for the Association of Prison Lawyers, the Equality and Human Rights Commission and The Public Law Project.

Plimmer was born in Trinidad. In June 2020 she appeared as a guest on Simon Armitage's BBC Radio 4 series The Poet Laureate Has Gone To His Shed.
