= National Poetry Centre =

UK charity based in Leeds, England

Coordinates: 53°48′24″N 1°33′4″W

The National Poetry Centre of the United Kingdom is a charity, registered in 2022. The National Poetry Centre plans to be the new headquarters for poetry in the UK and is expected to open in Leeds, West Yorkshire, in 2029.

Its trustees include Poet Laureate Simon Armitage, who has said "My highest ambition when appointed Poet Laureate was to create a national home for poetry in my native West Yorkshire."

In March 2024, it was announced that the Department for Levelling Up would make a grant of £5 million to the centre.

== Building ==
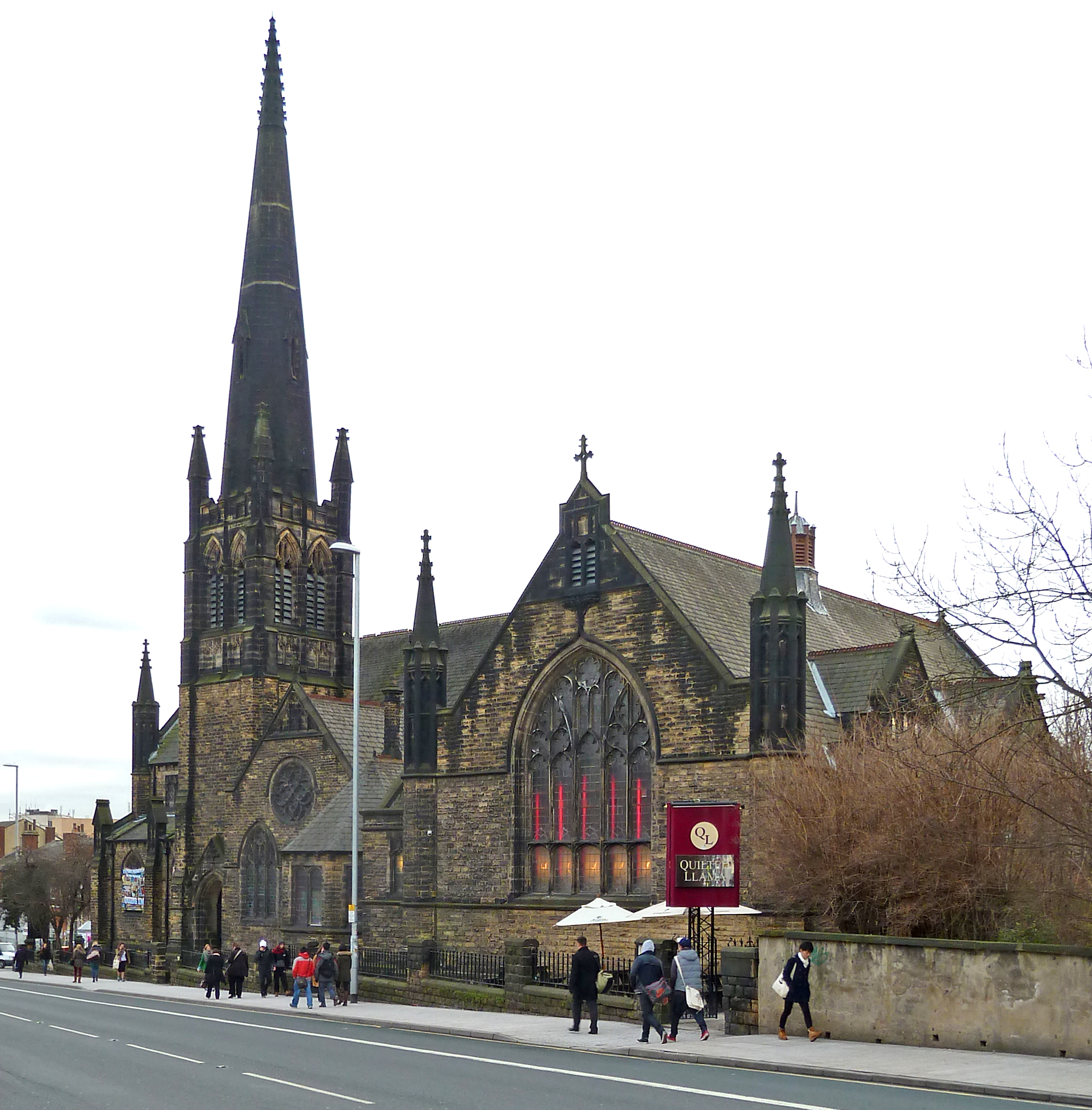
The former Trinity St David's church in 2013, at that time the Quilted Llama nightclub

The centre is to occupy the former Trinity St David's church on Woodhouse Lane, adjacent to the University of Leeds campus. This is a grade II listed building, which was a Congregational church from 1902 to 1972 and a United Reformed church from 1972 to 1997, and more recently has been used as a university furniture store and as a nightclub under the names "Halo" and "Quilted Llama".
