= The Poet Laureate Has Gone to His Shed =

BBC Radio 4 show and podcast 2020–

The Poet Laureate Has Gone to His Shed is a British podcast and BBC Radio 4 programme in which the Poet Laureate Simon Armitage speaks to an invited guest, usually in his writing-shed of his Yorkshire home. The first series of twelve hour-long broadcasts began in March 2020, just before the COVID-19 pandemic, the second series of nine began in July 2021, and the third series began in February 2023. The programme broadcast on 27 May 2020 was recorded while Armitage was self-isolating during the COVID-19 pandemic, and was the last of the first series.

The broadcasts were recorded in Armitage's writing shed in the garden of his home in West Yorkshire. The contents of the shed include "a harmonium, a pizza oven, a daybed, books on birdspotting, a decent spread of music cassettes, and an impressive collection of sherry", and he has described it as "close to nature without camping on the lawn, it's half inside and half outside". Armitage and his guest have a wide-ranging conversation, often touching on his ongoing translation of the medieval poem The Owl and the Nightingale, and the guest answers a series of quick-fire questions such as "night or day, north or south, Woman's Hour or In Our Time?" before being offered a glass of sherry.

In series 3, broadcast in 2023, the podcast available on BBC Sounds was up to 60 mins long but only a shortened version of 30 mins was broadcast on Radio 4.

On 2024 Radio 4 announced that it would not re-commission the series, a decision that Armitage described as "utterly bewildering". Speaking at the Oxford Literary Festival in April 2025, Armitage announced that the show would be revived with a different broadcaster, probably as a podcast. He reiterated his dissatisfaction with the BBC's decision not to make another series:

And, for reasons that I don’t understand and I bellyache about, they didn't commission another series. I really don’t understand it. It's very cheap to make. And it's regional – you can't get much more regional than me sitting in the garden. It was just me and a lawnmower.

== Episodes ==
Episodes
Series	Episode number	First broadcast	Guest	Notes
1	1	4 March 2020	Guy Garvey, singer, music presenter, birdwatcher	
1	2	11 March 2020	Kae Tempest, author	
1	3	18 March 2020	Testament, rapper and beatboxing champion	
1	4	25 March 2020	Maxine Peake, actor	
1	5	1 April 2020	Antony Gormley, sculptor	
1	6	8 April 2020	Lily Cole, model and entrepreneur	
1	7	15 April 2020	Sam Lee, singer	
1	8	22 April 2020	Melanie Plimmer, judge	
1	9	6 May 2020	Jackie Kay, poet	
1	10	13 May 2020	Laura Ashe, historian	
1	11	20 May 2020	Chris Packham	
1	12	27 May 2020	No guest	Recorded in self-isolation
2	13	3 July 2021	Johnny Marr, guitarist and member of The Smiths	
2	14	10 July 2021	Amanda Owen, shepherdess	
2	15	17 July 2021	Imtiaz Dharker, poet	
2	16	24 July 2021	J. K. Rowling, writer	
2	17	31 July 2021	Jo Whiley, radio and television presenter	
2	18	7 August 2021	Gillian Burke, television presenter	Recorded in Gyllyngdune Gardens in Falmouth.
2	19	14 August 2021	John Tiffany, theatre director	
2	20	21 August 2021	Sabrina Verjee, vet and ultrarunner	
2	21	28 August 2021	Prince Charles, Prince of Wales	Recorded in the Prince's "shed", a barn at Llwynywermod in Wales.
3	22	5 February 2023	Ian McKellen, actor	
3	23	12 February 2023	Lucy Beaumont, comedian	
3	24	19 February 2023	Simon Dobson, composer and conductor	
3	25	26 February 2023	Pam Ayres, poet	
3	26	5 March 2023	Loyle Carner, musician	Recorded in Carner's studio in Hackney, London.
3	27	12 March 2023	Olive Senior, poet	
3	28	19 March 2023	Glyn Maxwell, poet	
3	29	26 March 2023	Julie Hesmondhalgh	
