= Queenhood =

"Queenhood" is a poem written by the Poet Laureate of the United Kingdom, Simon Armitage, to mark the Platinum Jubilee of Elizabeth II. Tim Adams, writing for The Observer, described the poem as a tribute that "came close to capturing something of the unique service and strangeness of [the Queen's] life".
