= National Day of Reflection =

UK Covid commemoration, 23 March

Logo used in 2022

The Day of Reflection in the United Kingdom is a day to remember those who died during the COVID-19 pandemic. It was initiated, as the National Day of Reflection, in 2021 by the Marie Curie charity, and was held on 23 March, the anniversary of the first COVID-19 lockdown in the United Kingdom. In 2024 the word "National" was removed and the date was changed to Sunday 3 March 2024. It took place on 8 March 2025 and 9 March 2026. The event is supported by the Church of England and the government.

In 2022 the Poet Laureate, Simon Armitage, wrote the poem "Only Human", which he read at the service held at York Minster on the National Day of Reflection.
