= Stanza Stones Trail =

47-mile footpath in northern England

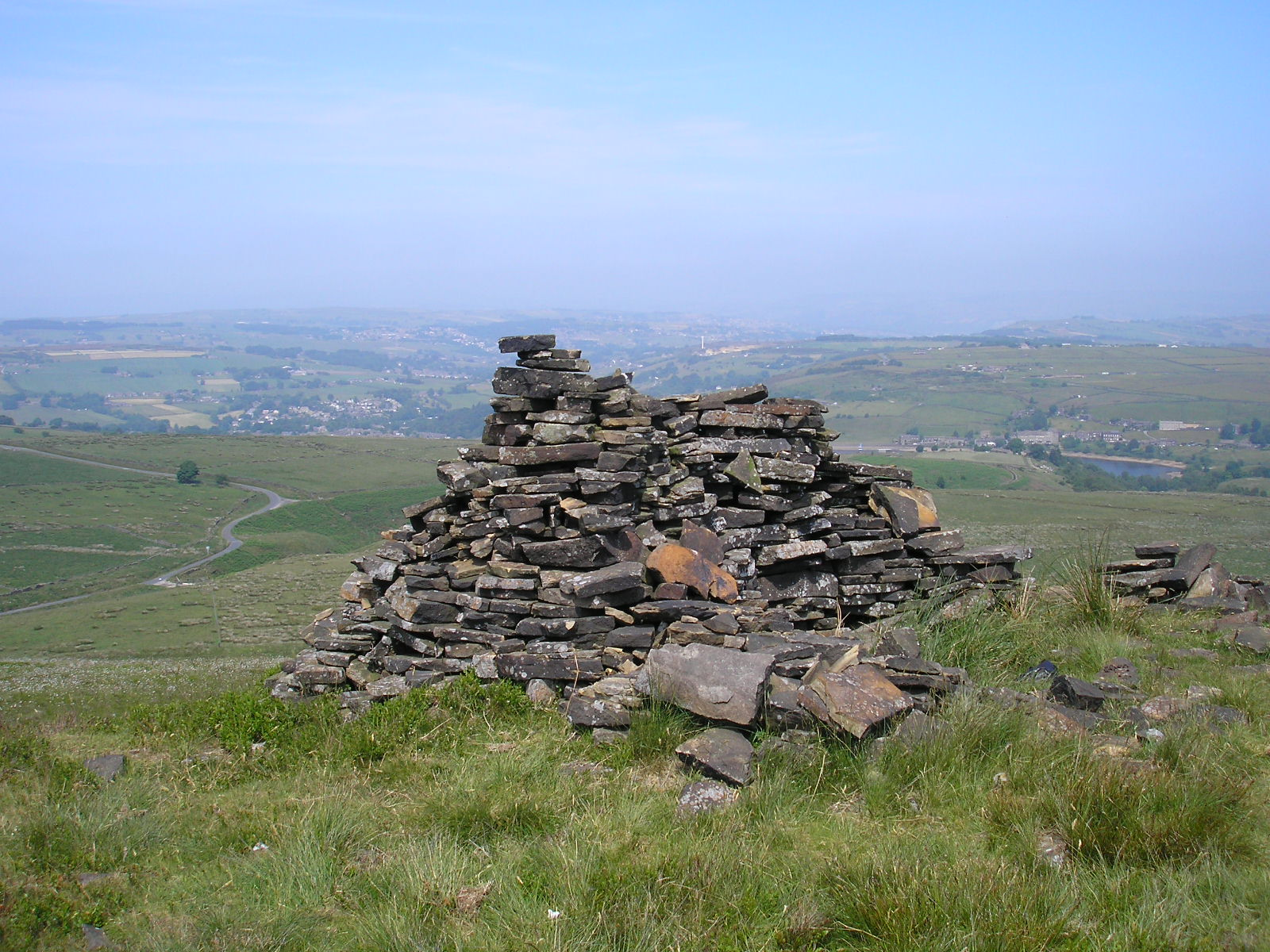
- South of Oxenhope
- Length: 47 mi (76 km)
- Location: West Yorkshire and Greater Manchester, England
- Trailheads: Marsden, Ilkley
- Use: Hiking
- Highest point: 467 metres (1,532 ft)
- Difficulty: Easy: some short hills and can be muddy in places
- Season: All year
- Sights: Six stones engraved with specially-written poems by Simon Armitage
- Hazards: Some rugged open moorland

The Stanza Stones Trail is a 47-mile (76 km) walking route from Marsden to Ilkley, along the Pennine watershed in northern England, linking six poems by Simon Armitage which have been carved into stone. It is mostly in West Yorkshire with some parts in Greater Manchester.

== Origins and poems ==
Simon Armitage was commissioned by the Ilkley Literature Festival in 2010 to write a set of site-specific poems, and the trail was created in 2012. Armitage wrote six poems on the theme of water in various forms: Beck, Dew, Mist, Puddle, Rain and Snow. These were carved by stone artist Pip Hall onto stones in the area of the Pennine watershed, and placed in locations selected with the help of landscape architect Tom Lonsdale. They are linked by a walking route from Armitage's home town of Marsden to the site of the festival in Ilkley. Armitage has written that "those looking hard enough might stumble across a seventh Stanza Stone, a secret stone left in an unnamed location within the Watershed area, waiting to be discovered and read."

A book called Stanza Stones, containing the poems and the accounts of Lonsdale and Hall, has been produced as a record of the journey and published by Enitharmon Press. The poems, complemented with commissioned wood engravings by Hilary Paynter, were also published in limited editions under the title In Memory of Water by Fine Press Poetry.

A group of young writers worked with Armitage to create an anthology of poems linked to the Stanza Stones. The project was criticised by a group of rock climbers who likened it to graffiti in unspoiled places.

== Walk ==
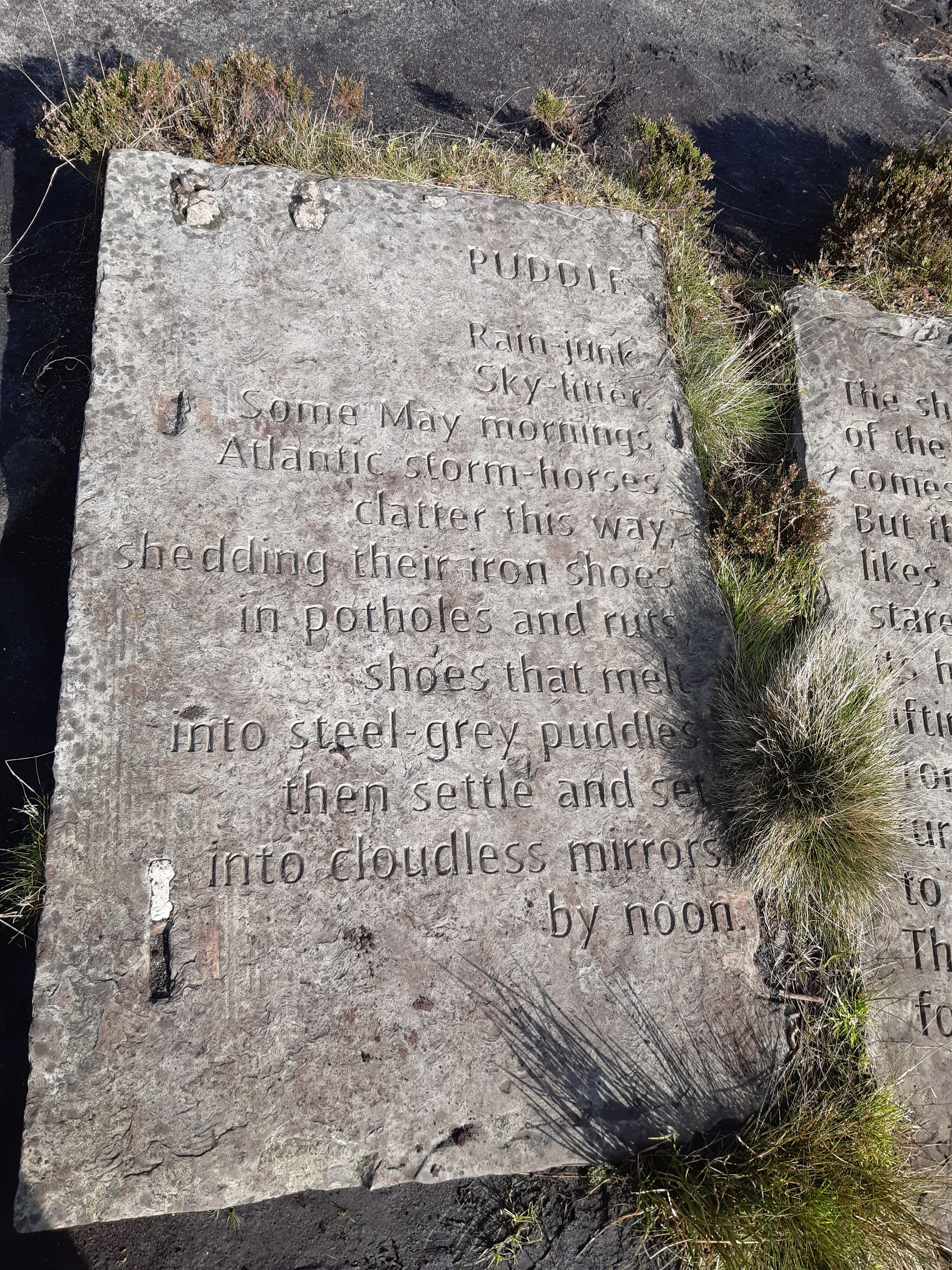
One of the Puddle Stones on Ilkley Moor, at the northern end of the Stanza Stones Trail

The walk is of 47 miles (76 km) (or 45 miles (72 km) according to the Long Distance Walkers Association). The total ascent is 1,786 metres (5,860 ft) and the highest point is 467 metres (1,532 ft). Some of the way is over rugged open moorland.

A guide was produced by the Ilkley Literature Festival in 2012, describing the whole walk and a series of family-friendly short walks to each of the stones.

An alternative Stanza Stones Walk, a 50-mile walking route linking the stones, has been published by Mike Melvin, who says that, while the original route is "a fine outing and one that will satisfy the desires of most people wishing to visit the Stanza Stones", his purpose was "to devise an upland walk linking the stones which did not stick to recognised footpaths or to existing well-known walking trails".

== Stones ==
The six stones are located as follows, from south to north:

- The Snow Stone: Pule Hill, Marsden SE0313510800
- The Rain Stone: Cow's Mouth Quarry, off A58 road between Littleborough and Ripponden SD9640019163
- The Mist Stone: Nab Hill, near Oxenhope SE0338032712
- The Dew Stones: Rivock Edge, off the road from Silsden to East MortonSE0738044952
- The Puddle Stones: Whetstone Gate Wireless Station, Rombalds Moor SE1105845195
- The Beck Stone: Backstone Beck, Ilkley Moor SE1254846817

== Bibliography ==
- Armitage, Simon; Hall, Pip; Lonsdale, Tom (2013). Stanza Stones. Enitharmon Press. ISBN 978-1907587306. Describing the whole project
