= Magnetic Field: The Marsden Poems =

2020 book by Simon Armitage

- Cover of first edition
- Author: Simon Armitage
- Cover artist: Design by Faber, photograph by Simon Armitage
- Genre: Poetry
- Set in: Marsden, West Yorkshire
- Publisher: Faber and Faber
- Publication date: 15 March 2020
- Media type: Hardback
- Pages: 89
- ISBN: 978-0-571-36144-1
- OCLC: 1153334504
- Preceded by: Sandettie Light Vessel Automatic
- Website: https://www.simonarmitage.com/magnetic-field-the-marsden-poems/

Magnetic Field: The Marsden Poems is a 2020 collection of poems by the English poet Simon Armitage. All 50 of the poems, written throughout his career, relate to places in his home village of Marsden, West Yorkshire. The book contains maps of the village, showing where each poem is situated. Armitage is a professor of poetry, and became Poet Laureate in 2019. He states that he found that he had been using Marsden to chart the effects of problems with the British economy and the sense of marginalisation that he felt.

The book has been welcomed by critics, who have noted Armitage's skill and accessibility, and the way he has brought Marsden to life on the page.

== Context ==
=== Author ===
Simon Armitage is an English poet, playwright and novelist. He was appointed as Poet Laureate of the United Kingdom in 2019. He is professor of poetry at the University of Leeds and became Oxford Professor of Poetry when he was elected to the four-year part-time appointment from 2015 to 2019. He was born and raised in Marsden, West Yorkshire, and still lives nearby.

=== Motivation ===
Armitage explains in the book's introduction that when he returned to Marsden with a geography degree, "I started looking out of [my bedroom] window again, and out of the large picture window in the living room with its wide-angle view of Marsden – and I was ready to write... the village became the drawing board or board game on which I could practise my poetics and play out my perspectives." He considers his motivations at that time, such as fabricating an identity, stating that whatever they were, they were "at a subconscious level". He notes that a different account would be needed to explain why he continued to write Marsden poems "on and off – for another three decades". He writes that he found he had been using Marsden to chart "the effects of the recession [from 2008], and the austerity that followed, and a growing sense of marginalisation in what was supposed to be an age of increased communication and connectedness."

== Book ==
It's a doll's house end terrace
with all the trimmings: hanging baskets,
a double garage,
a rambling garden with
a fairy-tale ending and geese

on the river. Inside
it's odd, dovetailed into next door
with the bedrooms
back-to-back, wallpaper walls
so their phone calls ring out

loud and clear ...

— Simon Armitage, from "Wintering Out", in
Magnetic Field: The Marsden Poems

=== Publication history ===
Magnetic Field: The Marsden Poems was published in hardback on 15 March 2020 by Faber and Faber in London. They brought out a paperback edition in 2021. They wrote that "Magnetic Field ... invites questions about the forging of identity, the precariousness of memory, and our attachment to certain places and the forces they exert."

=== Synopsis ===
The book contains 50 poems about Armitage's home village of Marsden, written at different times throughout his career. The poems are arranged roughly chronologically, not by date of writing but by the date to which each poem applies, something Armitage states could not be precise, as some apply to a range of dates. The endpapers are maps of parts of Marsden at differing scales, keyed to the poems by page numbers in red attached to each poem's location, such as a house, a garden, a reservoir, or a railway bridge.

=== Recordings ===
A BBC producer invited Armitage to read some of the poems in situ in their exact Marsden locations. They made recordings including of "Emergency" in the boarded-up fire station; "Harmonium" in St Bartholomew's Church; "Leaves on the Line" at the railway station; and "On Marsden Moor" on the moor around the village.

== Analysis ==
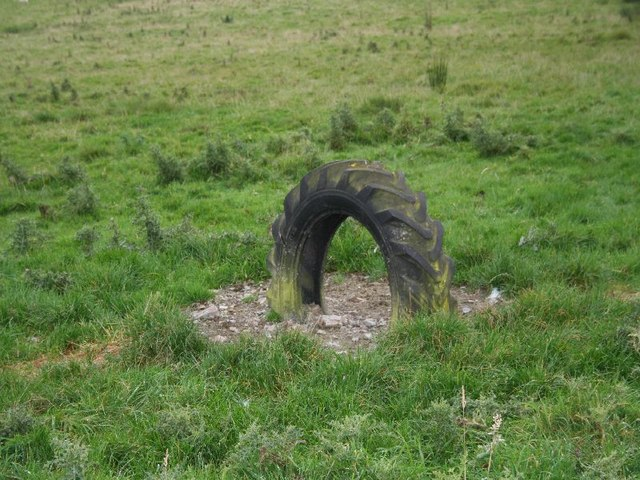
"The Tyre" tells how Armitage and other children found a tyre on the moor above Marsden, and set it rolling between their worlds.

The scholar of English literature Marion Thain, writing in Worldviews, calls "The Tyre" the poem which most clearly explores Armitage's thoughts about the borderland between city and countryside, Marsden being in her view just such a place. She notes that the scholar and critic Raymond Williams describes the car as embodying humanity's current relationship with the world, and argues that the tyre symbolises the interface between urban and rural, as well as the division between the two cultures. (Note: Armitage himself describes Marsden in this way: "I've come to feel that there is something genuinely unique about this transcendent and transgressive location: a border area where habitation meets the uninhabitable; where Yorkshire meets Lancashire (not just topographically, but culturally); where the land disappears into the sky on many days of the year; where the last lawn is separated from the moor by the dividing line of a privet hedge; where roads peter out into cart-tracks and bridleways.") The poem tells of finding a tyre on the moor "Lashed to the planet with grasses and roots". The narrator and the other children prise it free and make it roll. It bounds on to the road and rushes down to the village; they imagine "a phone-box upended, children erased, police and an ambulance in attendance," but when they arrive, they find no trace of it. The poem ends, she writes, with the children accepting a supernatural explanation for the tyre's disappearance. Thain notes that Armitage's semi-autobiographical 1998 travel book All Points North gives more detail of the tyre: "we must have tripped right over it, because it was sewn to the earth with tuft-grass and rushes, and the stitching had to be unpicked before we could prize it out of the peat and lift it up." The travel book, too, describes the tyre as "the giant vulcanized beast we'd brought to life", and tells how it crossed a main road, the A62, "between two wagons going at sixty miles an hour in opposite directions." Thain comments that the tyre is "ostensibly" back in the urban world of motor traffic, but is from the alarmed drivers' point of view "a beast run wild". The children wonder if they will find it, inanimate, "embedded in a house", or living, "lying in the gutter, playing dead". In her view, Armitage manages to "[marry] innocent and adult viewpoints" in his "allegory turned fairytale", avoiding closure and so connecting the geographic borderland with the natural/supernatural borderland of the poem.

Sarah Crown, writing in The Guardian, comments that "Snow Joke" set up Armitage's style with its opening line "Heard the one about the guy from Heaton Mersey?" Crown describes the poem as playing out a classic Armitage psychodrama, as a hubristic middle-aged married man, complete with mistress in another town, is found dead in his car, having ignored police warnings and driven through the snow. She admires the poem's ending, with its "final, ethereal image of the car buried in snow, its 'horn, moaning / softly like an alarm clock under an eiderdown'". In her view, comparing Armitage to Philip Larkin, this elevates the poem from its humdrum setting "to ethereal heights with a well-placed phrase".

== Reception ==
The poems are each situated geographically around the village, keyed with red lettering to their page numbers. The provision of maps (small detail shown) has been noted as a convenient feature of the book. The marked outline denotes an inset map of the area around the poet's childhood home.

The poet Jonathan Humble, in The Yorkshire Times, calls the book "a love letter to a muse that was there for the poet at the beginning and has continued to be a source of inspiration through to the present day." He notes that Armitage calls Marsden "genuinely unique … as a liminal, transcendent and transgressive location", and agrees it is an interesting place with a thriving cultural scene. He admires the book's production as "a lovely thing to behold", with its "handy maps", should the reader wish to walk what he predicts will become the "Armitage Trail", and the cover photograph of Marsden including the author's terrace house, and a shiny central band "illustrating (I believe) the magnetic attraction he feels towards the village." He writes that "The Marsden Poet" remains as Samuel Laycock, commemorated in stone in the village's park, noting that "this seems to rankle the Poet Laureate (and with some justification", as Laycock left Marsden when he was 11 years old). (Note: In 2020, Armitage wrote in The Guardian "Samuel Laycock, 'the Marsden poet' (what the hell do I have to do?), still looks out from his plinth near the bandstand in the park. So there’s a surface continuity, at least, to draw on and return to, as well as a continuity of vocabulary and dialect.") Humble concludes that Armitage "surely deserves some physical recognition in the village as, with understated skill and marvellous accessibility, [he] continues to put Marsden on the map."

The critic and editor Kate Simpson, in Poetry School, describes Magnetic Field as "a complex and alluring interpretation of our connection to both interior and exterior spaces: the grass is near touchable; the evening breeze tangible; the 'horizon ablaze' ("Emergency"). The fields await our return." In her view, the Marsden poems "are like cardinal directions, pointing back to the landscape and inviting readers to gather in a geographical amphitheatre."

== Bibliography ==
- Armitage, Simon (2020). Magnetic field: the Marsden poems. London: Faber and Faber. ISBN 978-0-571-36144-1. OCLC 1153334504.
