= Bethany Handley =

Welsh poet and disability activist

- Born: 1999 (age 26–27); Monmouthshire, Wales
- Education: Cardiff University
- Occupations: Author, poet, disability activist
- Writing career
- Genres: Poetry, nature writing, non-fiction
- Notable works: Cling Film (2025); My Body is a Meadow (2026); Beyond / Tu Hwnt (2025)
- Notable awards: Eric Gregory Award (2026)

Bethany Handley (born 1999) is a Welsh author, poet and disability activist from Monmouthshire. Her work explores disability, ableism, access to nature and Welsh landscapes.

She is the author of the poetry pamphlet Cling Film, and the non-fiction book My Body is a Meadow. She also co-edited Beyond / Tu Hwnt, an anthology of work by Welsh Deaf and disabled writers.

Handley received an Eric Gregory Award for Cling Film in 2026. Beyond / Tu Hwnt was shortlisted for the Discover category at the 2026 British Book Awards. In 2024, Handley was included in the Shaw Trust Disability Power 100 and was named among 10 influential disabled people working in politics, law and media.

== Early life and education ==
Handley grew up in Monmouthshire and spent much of her childhood outdoors, taking part in activities including hiking, climbing, kayaking and surfing. She later worked as an outdoor activity instructor.

She studied journalism, media, and English literature with creative writing at Cardiff University, graduating with a first-class degree in 2022.

Handley developed chronic illnesses in her teens and began using a wheelchair in her twenties. She is now also tube fed. She has described how paths and outdoor spaces she had previously used became inaccessible because of physical barriers, such as stiles, gates and unsuitable surfaces. These experiences became recurring subjects in her writing and campaigning.

== Writing ==
In 2023, Handley received the Gold Award in the creative non-fiction category of the Creative Future Writers' Award for The National Trust's Bomb Disposal Squad. She was also selected for Literature Wales' Representing Wales 2023–24 professional development programme.

In March 2024, to mark International Wheelchair Day, Country Living commissioned Handley to write "I'm not advocating for all beauty spots to be tarmacked". The poem explores wheelchair use, access to nature and the different ways people experience outdoor spaces.

Handley's first poetry pamphlet Cling Film was published by Seren in 2025. The collection addresses disability, medical treatment, bodily autonomy and discrimination against disabled women. A profile in The Bookseller described Handley's poetry as confronting "the systemic discrimination she has experienced as a disabled woman".

In July 2025, poet Carol Rumens selected "Poem in which I'm a transnational drug smuggler" as The Guardian Poem of the Week. Rumens discussed the poem's use of humour and satire to portray the treatment of disabled passengers during airport security checks.

Handley's poem "Limbs not walked on" was highly commended by the Forward Prizes in 2025. In 2026, she received an Eric Gregory Award from the Society of Authors for Cling Film.

Handley co-edited Beyond / Tu Hwnt with Megan Angharad Hunter and Sioned Erin Hughes. Published by Lucent Dreaming in 2025, it is an anthology of work by Welsh Deaf and disabled writers in Welsh and English. The anthology was shortlisted for the Discover category at the 2026 British Book Awards.

Her debut non-fiction book My Body is a Meadow: Finding Freedom in the Outdoors was published by Headline in May 2026 and was longlisted for The Wainwright Prize for Nature Writing 2026. Combining memoir, nature writing and social commentary, it considers the barriers disabled people encounter when accessing green and blue spaces and examines connections between ableism, land access and environmental damage. The book was included in The Conversation's selection of climate books to look out for in 2026.

In 2026, Handley served as the judge of the Poetry Wales Award.

Handley regularly speaks at festivals and events, including the Hay Festival. She has read with the Poet Laureate Simon Armitage and Owen Sheers as part of The Poet Laureate Library Tour.

== Disability and access advocacy ==
Handley campaigns for improved disabled access to nature and outdoor spaces. She is an ambassador for Country Living's Access for All campaign and Ramblers.

She also serves on the Lived Experience Advisory Board for ParalympicsGB.

In 2023, the Institute of Welsh Affairs published Handley's essay "Welsh Landscapes, Disability and the Myth of Personal Independence". The essay examines the exclusion of disabled people from Welsh landscapes, outdoor narratives and ideas of national identity. It argues that many people are excluded by the design and management of outdoor spaces rather than by nature itself.

In 2024, RCN Wales quoted Handley's essay in written evidence submitted to the Senedd Health and Social Care Committee's inquiry into preventing ill health and obesity. The evidence cited her discussion of inaccessible paths, maps, wheelchairs and outdoor facilities as part of its argument that physical activity and green spaces should be made accessible to disabled people.

== Awards and recognition ==
- Gold Award, Creative Future Writers' Award, creative non-fiction category, for "The National Trust's Bomb Disposal Squad" (2023).
- Shortlisted for the Royal Society of Literature Jerwood Poetry Award (2024).
- Included in the Shaw Trust Disability Power 100, politics, law and media category (2024).
- Highly commended by the Forward Prizes for "Limbs not walked on" (2025).
- Eric Gregory Award for Cling Film (2026).
- Beyond / Tu Hwnt, co-edited by Handley, shortlisted for the Discover category at the British Book Awards (2026).
- Longlisted for the Wainwright Prize for Nature Writing 2026

== Select works ==
=== Poetry ===
- Cling Film (Seren, 2025)

=== Non-fiction ===
- My Body is a Meadow: Finding Freedom in the Outdoors (Headline, 2026)

=== Edited works ===
- Beyond / Tu Hwnt, co-edited with Megan Angharad Hunter and Sioned Erin Hughes (Lucent Dreaming, 2025)
