= Off the Shelf Festival =

Annual literary festival in Sheffield, England

Off the Shelf Festival of Words
- Status: Active
- Genre: Festival
- Date: October
- Frequency: Annually
- Locations: Sheffield, South Yorkshire
- Country: England
- Years active: 1991–present
- Website: Official website

The Off the Shelf Festival of Words takes place in Sheffield, England, during October each year. It is organised by the University of Sheffield with support from Arts Council England, Sheffield Hallam University and several commercial companies. The Festival offers events for all ages, and for more than two weeks.

== History ==
First held in 1991, the Off the Shelf Festival of Words has become an annual event attracting literature and media personalities to Sheffield. The line-up normally combines a selection of authors, poets, journalists and broadcasters. The festival also caters for community and outreach provision and supports emerging writers through workshops, exhibitions, storytelling, talks, walks. It also runs a programme of events for children and young people.

The festival is curated by Lesley Webster and Maria de Souza, who have both been involved since the early years of the festival. It began as a collaboration between the Sheffield libraries and Sheffield University, and the university took over the organisation in 2016. The curators relate how they attracted writers to the event, including Nick Hornby, by sending them Valentine's Day cards signed from "a city full of admirers". The festival plans the programme in collaboration with local organisations such as Sheffield Authors, Slambarz and Sheffield Novelists, and local publishers such as And Other Stories, The Poetry Business, Vertebrate and Longbarrow.

In 2024 the festival ran from 7 October to 3 November, and included eighty events.

== Notable speakers ==
Previous festivals have included events with

- Simon Armitage
- Nick Clegg
- Carol Ann Duffy
- Hugh Fearnley-Whittingstall
- Michael Frayn
- Stephen Fry
- Donna Hilbert
- Nick Hornby
- Doris Lessing
- David Lodge
- John Lydon
- Paul Merton
- Michael Morpurgo
- Helen Mort
- Andrew Motion
- Jamie Oliver
- Jodi Picoult
- John Pilger
- Ian Rankin
- Michael Rosen
- Prunella Scales
- Will Self
- Lionel Shriver
- Lemn Sissay
- David Starkey
- Claire Tomalin
- Rose Tremain
- Benjamin Zephaniah
