= Samuel Laycock =

British writer

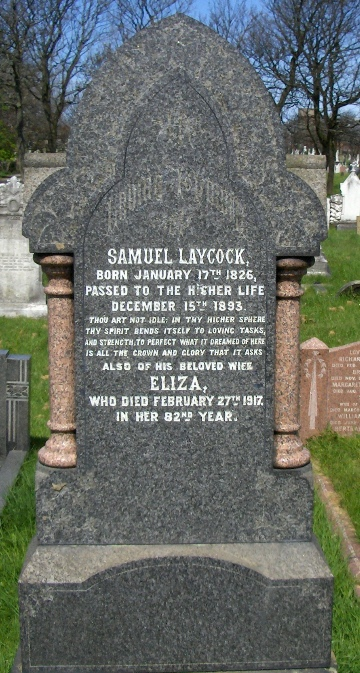
Samuel Laycock's grave

Samuel Laycock (1826–1893) was a dialect poet who recorded in verse the vernacular of the Lancashire cotton workers. He was known as the Marsden poet.

He was born on 17 January 1826 at Intake Head, Pule Hill, Marsden, West Yorkshire, the son of John Laycock, a hand-loom weaver. His formal education consisted of attending Sunday school and a few months at a local school. Laycock began work in a woollen mill at the age of nine. In 1837, when the family moved to Stalybridge, Cheshire, he worked as a cotton weaver and later cloth looker. The American Civil War (1861–1864) badly affected the Lancashire cotton towns as supplies of raw cotton dried up. Laycock was one of the thousands unemployed and tried to earn a meagre living by writing verses which the unemployed could set to music and sing in the streets for pennies. In 1864, he published Lancashire Rhymes and in 1866, Lancashire Songs, poems which documented the everyday life of cotton workers.

In 1865, Laycock became the librarian at Stalybridge Mechanics' Institute, and in 1867, took up a similar post at The Whitworth Institute, Fleetwood. He moved to Blackpool in 1868 because his health was poor. He continued writing while working as a photographer, while his wife ran a lodging-house. Just before his death in 1893, he published a collection of poems, Warblin's fro' an Owd Songster.

In 1850, Laycock married Martha Broadbent, a cotton weaver, but she died two years later. He remarried in 1858 to Hannah Woolley, who died in 1863. His third marriage was to Eliza Pontefract in 1864 and she survived him. He had several children by Hannah and at least two by Eliza, including Arthur, who became a novelist.

Laycock died of influenza which developed into acute bronchitis on 15 December 1893, at his home, 48 Foxhall Road, Blackpool. He was buried in Layton Cemetery, Blackpool.

== See also ==
- Simon Armitage, poet laureate, also born in Marsden
