= Karl Philipp Moritz =

German author, editor and essayist

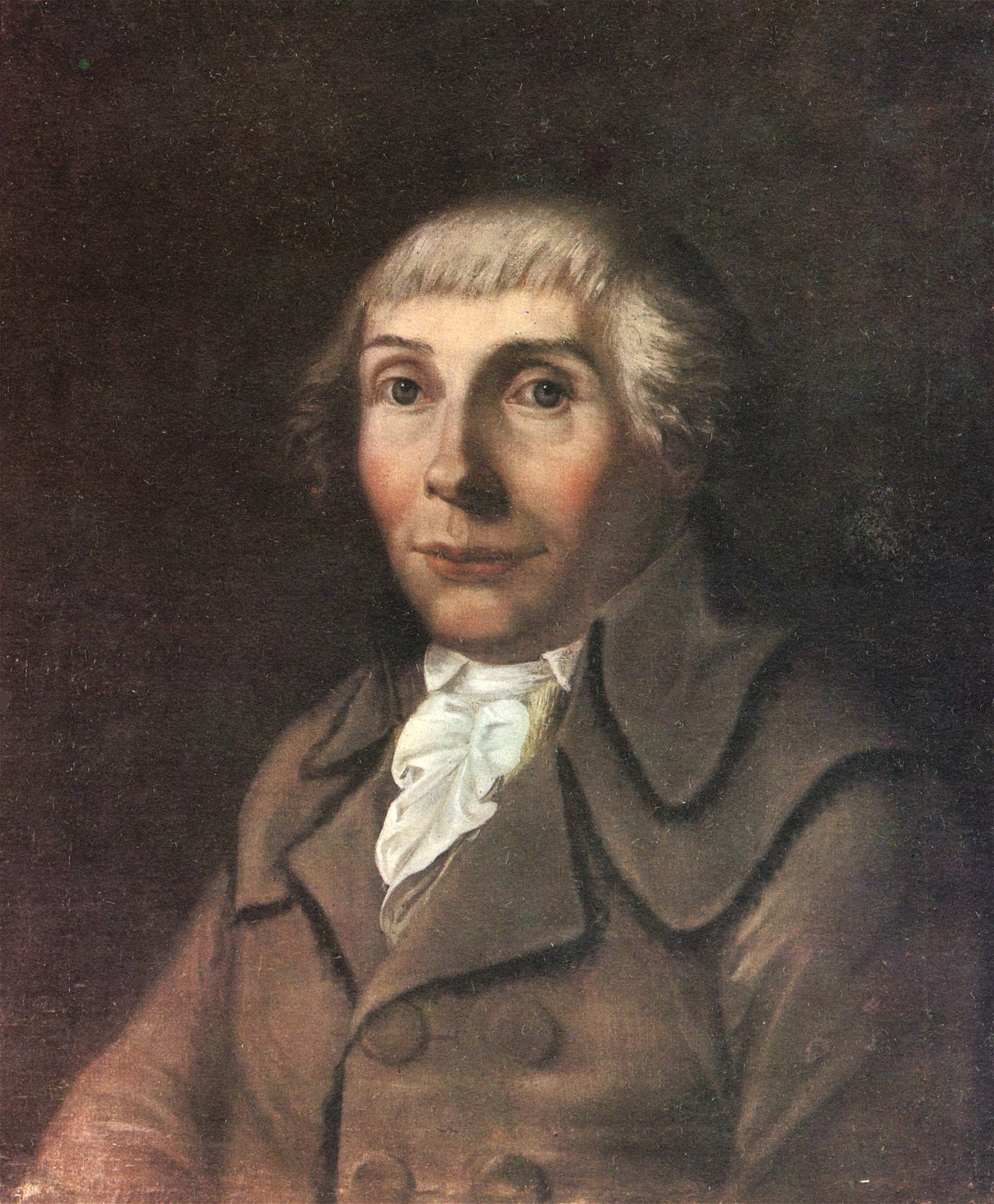
- Portrait by Karl Franz Jacob Heinrich Schumann (1763-1827)

Signature
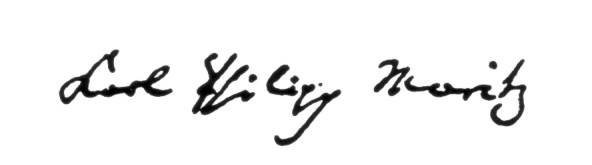

Karl Philipp Moritz (Hameln, 15 September 1756 – Berlin, 26 June 1793) was a German author, editor and essayist of the Sturm und Drang, late Enlightenment, and classicist periods, influencing early German Romanticism as well. He led a life as a hatter's apprentice, teacher, journalist, literary critic, professor of art and linguistics, and member of both of Berlin's academies.

== Biography ==
Moritz was born into impoverished circumstances in Hameln in 1756. After receiving a scanty schooling, he was apprenticed to a hat maker. After distressful attempts to gain a living, he caught the attention of a patron in Hanover and entered a gymnasium; however, he soon accepted an engagement as actor under Ekhof at Gotha, failing in which he returned to study (1776) at Erfurt; but tiring again he joined the Herrnhuter (Moravian Church) at Barby, and studied theology at Wittenberg (1777); then taught philanthropy at the Potsdam military orphanage, soon again to take to wandering.

Teaching in Berlin, he made a reputation as writer, preacher and poet, and went to England. Then he became professor at the gymnasium (high school) at Berlin (German: Köllnisches Gymnasium). Next he tried editing the Vossische Zeitung to make it proletarian, but failed. Later he traveled to Italy (1786) where he met Goethe, and on his return to Germany he took up residence as Goethe's guest at Weimar. Duke Karl August helped him join the Berlin Academy of Sciences, and in 1789 Moritz became a professor of antiquities at the Royal Academy of Fine Arts in Berlin. Among his students were Ludwig Tieck, Wilhelm Heinrich Wackenroder and Alexander von Humboldt. He was an avid admirer of Jean Paul, and befriended Moses Mendelssohn, and Asmus Jakob Carstens.

== Works ==
Apart from a four-part autobiographical novel, Anton Reiser, and two fictional Andreas Hartknopf novels, he also wrote a number of theoretical writings on aesthetics, especially "Über die bildende Nachahmung des Schönen" (On the Formative Imitation of Beauty), which Goethe excerpted in his Italian Journey. Moritz's Magazin zur Erfahrungsseelenkunde als ein Lesebuch für Gelehrte und Ungelehrte (Journal of Experiential Psychology, as reading for scholars and laymen) was one of the first Germanophone journals of psychology. His works include:

- Blunt oder der Gast, 1781
- Beiträge zur Philosophie des Lebens aus dem Tagebuch eines Freimäurers, 1780
- Magazin zur Erfahrungsseelenkunde als ein Lesebuch für Gelehrte und Ungelehrte. 1783–1793
- Reisen eines Deutschen in England im Jahre 1782, 1783. English: Journeys of a German in England in 1782
- Ideal einer vollkommnen Zeitung, 1784
- Anton Reiser (Part 1), 1785
- Andreas Hartknopf, Eine Allegorie, 1785
- Anton Reiser (Parts 2 and 3), 1786
- Denkwürdigkeiten, aufgezeichnet zur Beförderung des Edlen und Schönen, 1786
- Versuch einer deutschen Prosodie, 1786
- Versuch einer kleinen praktischen Kinderlogik, 1786
- Fragmente aus dem Tagebuche eines Geistersehers, 1787
- Über die bildende Nachahmung des Schönen, 1788
- Italien und Deutschland, 1789
- Monats-Schrift der Akademie der Künste und Mechanischen Wissenschaften zu Berlin, 1789
- Über eine Schrift des Herrn Schulrath Campe, und über die Rechte des Schriftstellers und Buchhändlers, 1789
- Andreas Hartknopfs Predigerjahre, 1790
- Anton Reiser (Part 4), 1790
- Neues ABC-Buch, 1790
- Annalen der Akademie der Künste und Mechanischen Wissenschaften, 1791
- Anthusa oder Roms Alterthümer, 1791
- Götterlehre oder Mythologische Dichtungen der Alten, 1791
- Grundlinien zu meinen Vorlesungen über den Styl, 1791
- Italienische Sprachlehre für die Deutschen, 1791
- Über die Vereinfachung der menschlichen Kenntnisse, 1791
- Lesebuch für Kinder, 1792
- Mythologischer Almanach für Damen, 1792
- Reisen eines Deutschen in Italien in den Jahren 1786 bis 1788, 1792
- Vom richtigen deutschen Ausdruck, 1792
- Allgemeiner deutscher Briefsteller, 1793
- Die große Loge oder der Freimaurer mit Waage und Senkblei, 1793
- Grammatisches Wörterbuch (4 vols. 1793–1800)
- Mythologisches Wörterbuch zum Gebrauch für Schulen, 1793
- Reisen eines Deutschen in Italien in den Jahren 1786 bis 1788, 1793
- Vorbegriffe zu einer Theorie der Ornamente, 1793
- Vorlesungen über den Styl (Part 1), 1793
- Die neue Cecilia, (1793, fragment)

== Sources ==
- Apel, Kim. Predigten in der Literatur: Homiletische Erkundungen bei Karl Philipp Moritz. Praktische Theologie in Geschichte und Gegenwart (Tuebingen: Mohr Siebeck, 2009).
