= Journeys of a German in England in 1782 =

Book by Karl Philipp Moritz

Reisen eines Deutschen in England im Jahre 1782 (English: Journeys of a German in England in 1782) is a travel memoir by German author Karl Philipp Moritz. Moritz was a young scholar and Anglophile traveling to England for the first time. His journey was approximately two months during June and July 1782 and began in London where he saw famous sights, attended the theater and watched sessions of the Parliament of Great Britain. He then set out on foot for Richmond, stopping at Oxford, Derby, Leicester, Peak Cavern and Northampton, before returning to London. The book was written as a series of letters to Moritz's friend at home and is in two equal parts, the first in London, the second walking about.

The first edition was published in Germany in 1783 with a second improved edition in 1785. In 1795 an English translation of the second edition was published as Travels, chiefly on Foot, through several parts of England in 1782, described in Letters to a Friend. It contained many errors and was attributed to the daughter of Charles Godfrey Woide (1725–1790), who himself is described in Chapter 5 "Information and entertainment". Despite its flaws, it became the standard translation of the 19th and early 20th centuries. A new translation was published in 1965 by Reginald Nettel and is now the standard English edition. It was republished by Eland As Journeys of a German in England: A Walking Tour of England in 1782 (1983, new edition 2009).

In deciding to complete his journey on foot, Moritz was met with a rude reception. The Inclosure Acts had forced England's peasants to become employees of land-owners, and those who could not find employment became the "wandering poor" – thus anyone seen walking along the road was identified as a beggar or a thief. For this reason, Moritz experienced considerable problems finding room and board, and was even run out of some villages, simply for arriving into town on foot.

== Sources ==
- Reginald Nettel, trans. (1965). Journeys of a German in England in 1782. A new translation.
- Travels in England in 1782 at Project Gutenberg. Based on the problematic 1795 translation.
