= Simon Armitage =

English poet (born 1963)

Simon Armitage CBE, FRSL
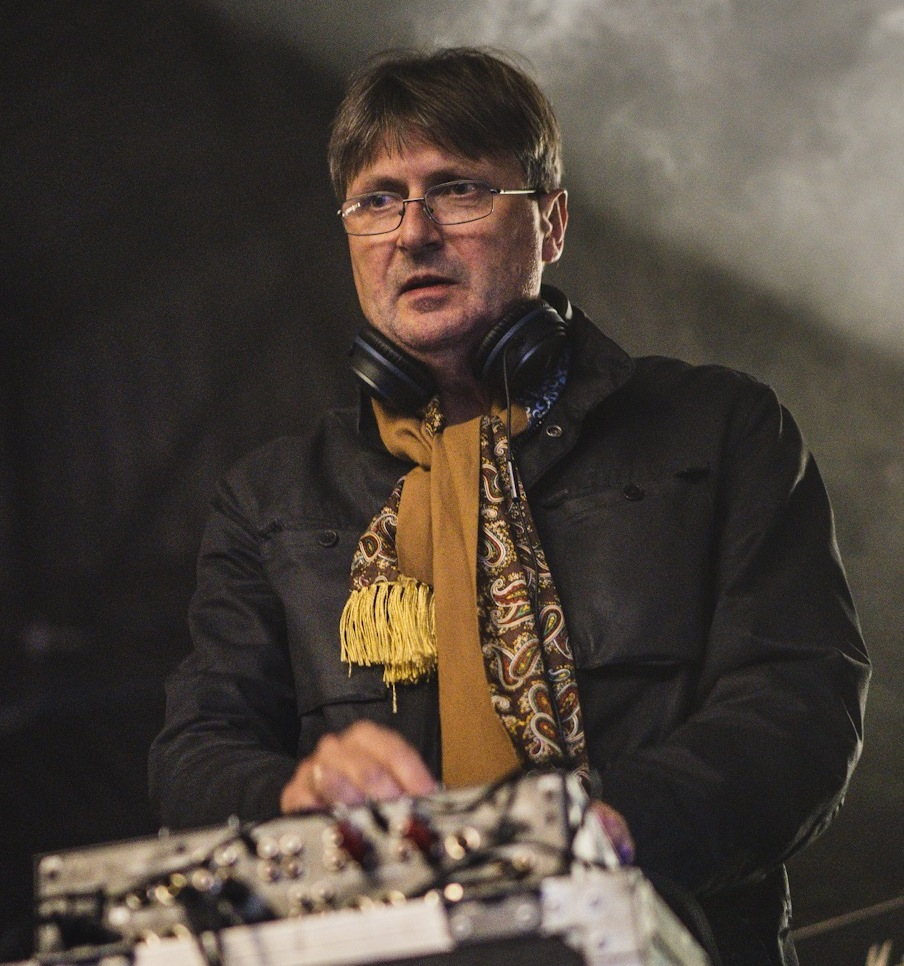
- Armitage in 2019

Poet Laureate of the United Kingdom
- Incumbent
- Assumed office 10 May 2019
- Monarchs: Elizabeth II; Charles III
- Preceded by: Carol Ann Duffy

Personal details
- Born: Simon Robert Armitage; 26 May 1963 (age 63) Huddersfield, West Riding of Yorkshire, England
- Spouse(s): Alison Tootell (div.); Sue Roberts
- Children: 1
- Education: Colne Valley High School
- Alma mater: Portsmouth Polytechnic; University of Manchester
- Occupation: Poet, playwright, novelist, singer
- Website: www.simonarmitage.com

Simon Robert Armitage (born 26 May 1963) is an English poet, playwright, musician and novelist. He was appointed Poet Laureate on 10 May 2019. He is professor of poetry at the University of Leeds.

He has published over 20 collections of poetry, starting with Zoom! in 1989. Many of his poems concern his home town of Marsden in West Yorkshire; these are collected in Magnetic Field: The Marsden Poems. He has translated classic poems including the Alliterative Morte Arthure, Pearl, and Sir Gawain and the Green Knight, and has dramatised the Odyssey. He has written several travel books including Moon Country and Walking Home: Travels with a Troubadour on the Pennine Way. He has edited poetry anthologies including one on the work of Ted Hughes. He has participated in numerous television and radio documentaries, dramatisations, and travelogues.

== Early life and education ==
Armitage was born on 26 May 1963 in Huddersfield, West Riding of Yorkshire, and grew up in the village of Marsden, where his family still live. He has an older sister, Hilary. His father Peter was a former electrician, probation officer and firefighter who was well known locally for writing plays and pantomimes for his all-male panto group, The Avalanche Dodgers.

He wrote his first poem aged 10 as a school assignment. Armitage first studied at Colne Valley High School, Linthwaite, and went on to study geography at Portsmouth Polytechnic. He was a postgraduate student at the University of Manchester, where his MA thesis concerned the effects of television violence on young offenders. Finding himself jobless after graduation, he decided to train as a probation officer, like his father before him. Around this time he began writing poetry more seriously, though he continued to work as a probation officer in Greater Manchester until 1994.

== Career ==
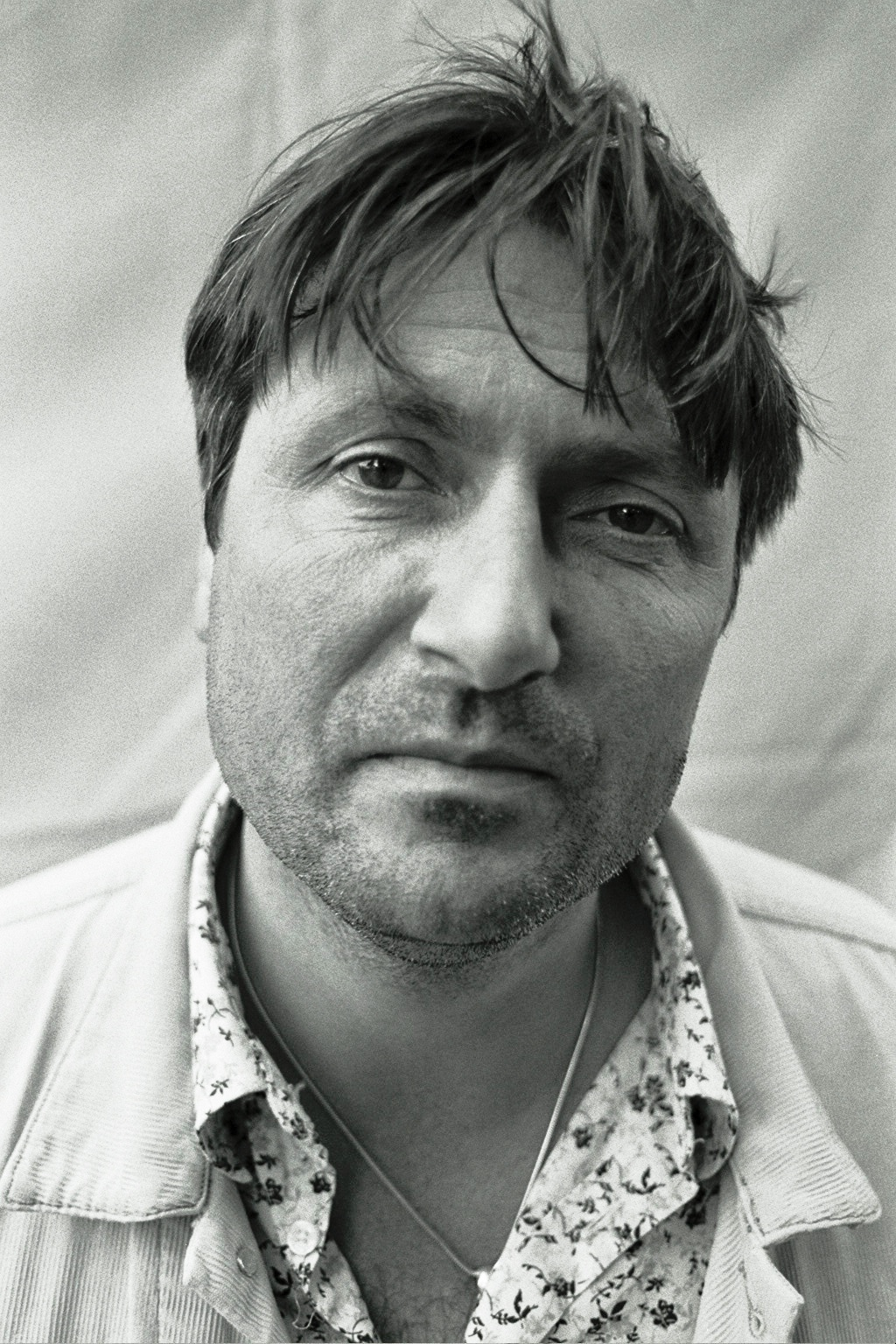
Armitage in 2009

Armitage has lectured on creative writing at the University of Leeds and at the University of Iowa, and in 2008 was a senior lecturer at Manchester Metropolitan University. He has made literary, history and travel programmes for BBC Radio 3 and 4; and since 1992 he has written and presented a number of TV documentaries. From 2009 to 2012 he was Artist in Residence at London's South Bank, and in February 2011 he became Professor of Poetry at the University of Sheffield. He was elected to serve as Professor of Poetry at the University of Oxford for 2015–2019. In October 2017 he was appointed as the first Professor of Poetry at the University of Leeds. In 2019 he was appointed Poet Laureate for ten years, following Carol Ann Duffy. He is a trustee of the National Poetry Centre, a charity established in 2022 which plans to open "a new national home for poetry" in Leeds in 2027. In 2025 he received the Freedom of the City of London, for "his outstanding achievements in the written word and his enthusiastic promotion of poetry, in particular, to the younger generation".

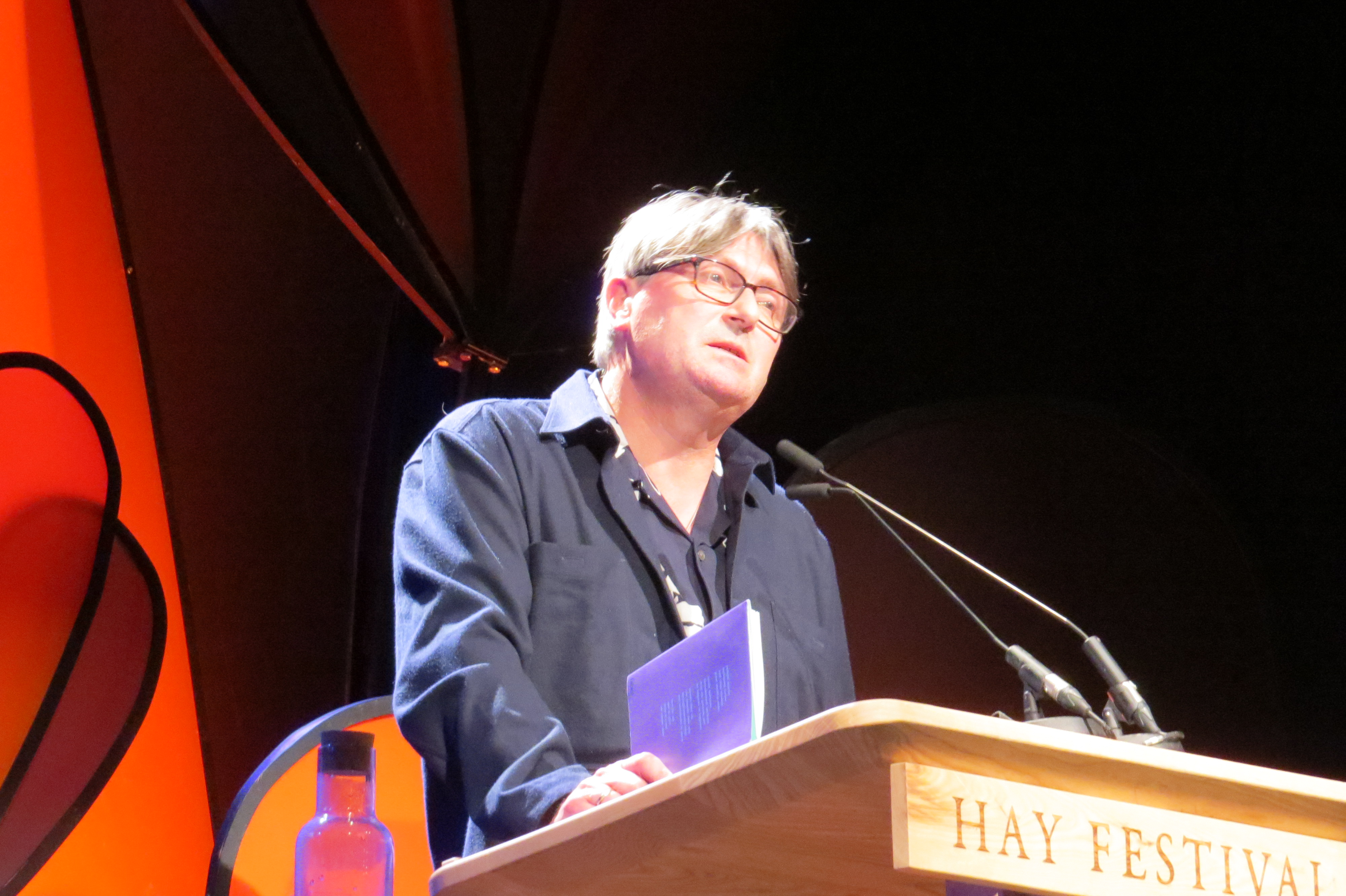
Armitage at the Hay Festival in June 2023

=== Writing ===
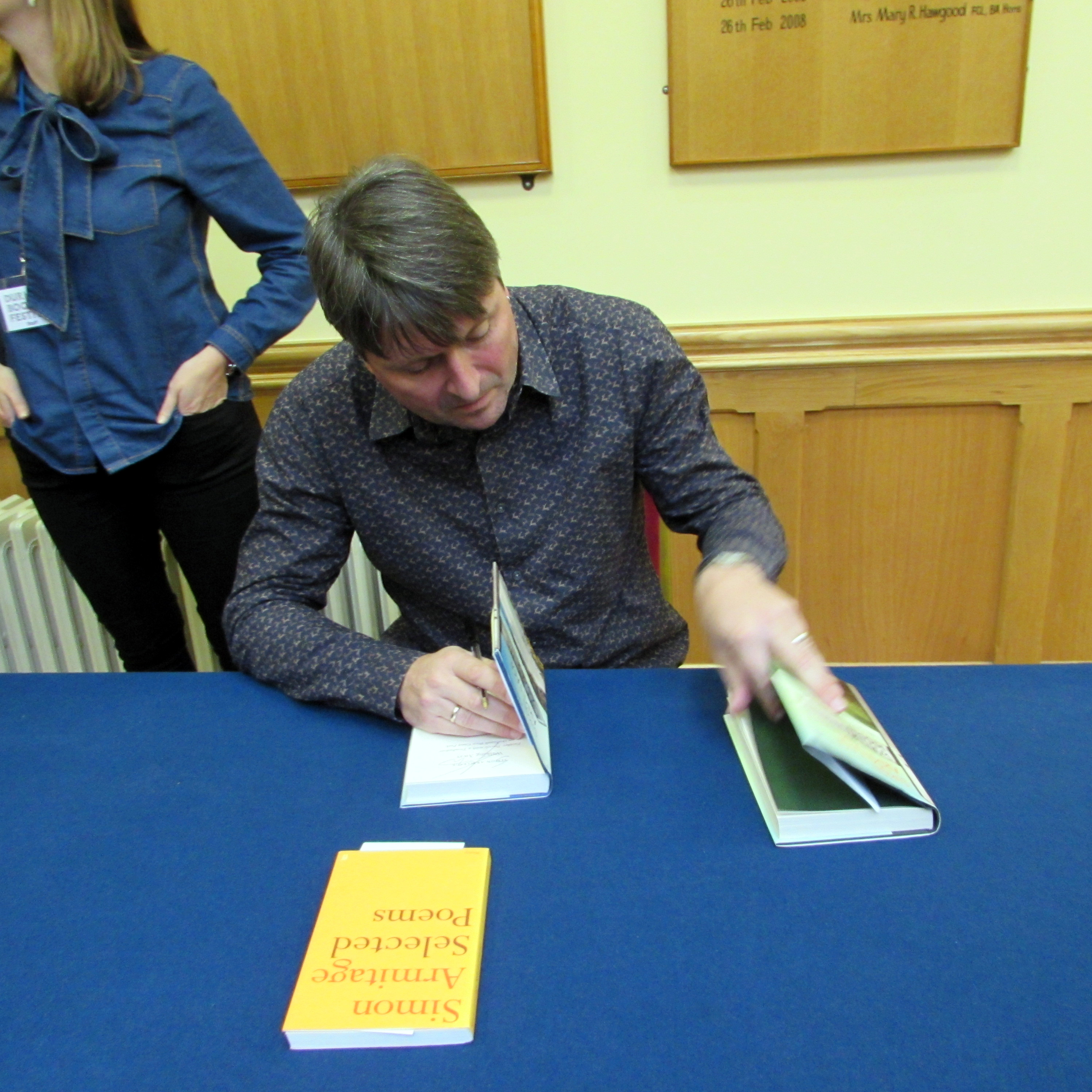
Armitage in 2015

Armitage's first book-length poetry collection Zoom! was published in 1989. As well as some new poems, it contained works published in three pamphlets in 1986 and 1987. His poetry collections include Book of Matches (1993) and The Dead Sea Poems (1995). He has written two novels, Little Green Man (2001) and The White Stuff (2004), as well as All Points North (1998), a collection of essays on Northern England. He produced a dramatised version of Homer's Odyssey and a collection of poetry entitled Tyrannosaurus Rex Versus The Corduroy Kid (shortlisted for the T. S. Eliot Prize), both published in 2006. Armitage's poems feature in multiple British GCSE syllabuses for English Literature. He is characterised by a dry Yorkshire wit combined with "an accessible, realist style and critical seriousness." His translation of Sir Gawain and the Green Knight (2007) was adopted for the ninth edition of The Norton Anthology of English Literature, and he was the narrator of a 2010 BBC documentary about the poem and its use of landscape.

For the Stanza Stones Trail, which runs through 47 miles (76 km) of the Pennine region, Armitage composed six new poems on his walks. With the help of local expert Tom Lonsdale and letter-carver Pip Hall, the poems were carved into stones at secluded sites. A book, containing the poems and the accounts of Lonsdale and Hall, has been produced as a record of that journey and has been published by Enitharmon Press. The poems, complemented with commissioned wood engravings by Hilary Paynter, were also published in several limited editions under the title 'In Memory of Water' by Fine Press Poetry. For National Poetry Day in 2020, BT commissioned him to write "Something clicked", a reflection on lockdown during the COVID-19 pandemic. In 2023 The National Trust commissioned a poem by Armitage for Brimham Rocks in North Yorkshire. Artist Adrian Riley collaborated with Armitage and stone carver Richard Dawson to create 'Balancing Act' – a gateway-like public artwork carrying Armitage's poem where the rocks meet moorland.

Armitage's translation of the Epic of Gilgamesh, Gilgamesh - A New Verse Translation, was published by Liveright in April 2026; it has been described as "A propulsive and lyrical version of ancient Mesopotamia’s greatest adventure–tale".

In 2026, Armitage wrote the script for Aschenputtel, a puppet short film based on the Grimm Brothers' variant of Cinderella and narrated by Anne-Marie Duff.

=== Writing as Poet Laureate ===
In 2019 Armitage's first poem as Poet Laureate, "Conquistadors", commemorating the 1969 Moon landing, was published in The Guardian. Armitage's second poem as Poet Laureate, "Finishing it", was commissioned in 2019 by the Institute of Cancer Research. Graham Short, a micro-engraver, meticulously carved the entire 51-word poem onto a facsimile of a cancer treatment tablet. Armitage wrote "All Right" as part of Northern train operator's suicide prevention campaign for Mental Health Awareness Week. Their video has a soundtrack of the poem being read by Mark Addy, while the words also appear on screen. On 21 September 2019 he read his poem "Fugitives", commissioned by the Association of Areas of Natural Beauty, on Arnside Knott, Cumbria, in celebration of the 70th anniversary of the National Parks and Access to the Countryside Act, during an event that included the formation of a heart outlined by people on the hillside. Armitage wrote "Ark" for the naming ceremony of the British Antarctic Survey's new ship RRS Sir David Attenborough on 26 September 2019. "the event horizon" was written in 2019 to commemorate the opening of The Oglesby Centre, an extension to Hallé St Peter's, the Halle orchestra's venue for rehearsals, recordings, education and small performances. The poem is incorporated into the building "in the form of a letter-cut steel plate situated in the entrance to the auditorium, the 'event horizon'". "Ode to a Clothes Peg" celebrates the bicentenary of John Keats' six 1819 odes of which Armitage says, "Among his greatest works, the poems are also some of the most famous in the English Language."

On 12 January 2020, Armitage gave the first reading of his poem "Astronomy for Beginners", written to celebrate the bicentenary of the Royal Astronomical Society, on BBC Radio 4's Broadcasting House. "Lockdown", first published in The Guardian on 21 March 2020, is a response to the coronavirus pandemic, referencing the Derbyshire "plague village" of Eyam, which self-isolated in 1665 to limit the spread of the Great Plague of London, and the Sanskrit poem "Meghadūta" by Kālidāsa, in which a cloud carries a message from an exile to his distant wife. Armitage read his "Still Life", another poem about the lockdown, on BBC Radio 4's Today programme on 20 April 2020. An installation of his "The Omnipresent" was part of an outdoor exhibition Everyday Heroes at London's Southbank Centre in autumn 2020. Huddersfield Choral Society commissioned Armitage to provide lyrics for works by Cheryl Frances-Hoad and Daniel Kidane, resulting in "The Song Thrush and the Mountain Ash" and "We'll Sing", which were released on video in autumn 2020. Armitage asked members of the choir to send him one word each to represent their experience of lockdown, and worked with these to produce the two lyrics. Armitage read "The Bed" in Westminster Abbey on 11 November 2020 at the commemoration of the 100th anniversary of the burial of The Unknown Warrior.

" 'I speak as someone ...' " was first published in The Times on 20 February 2021 and commemorates the 200th anniversary of the death of the poet John Keats, who died in Rome on 23 February 1821. To mark a stage in the easing of lockdown, Armitage wrote "Cocoon" which he read on BBC Radio 4's Today on 29 March 2021. "The Patriarchs – An Elegy" marks the death of Prince Philip and was released on the day of his funeral, 17 April 2021. It refers to the snow on the day of his death, and Armitage has said "I've written about a dozen laureate poems since I was appointed, but this is the first royal occasion and it feels like a big one". Armitage wrote "70 notices" in 2021 as a commission for the Off the Shelf Festival to celebrate the 70th anniversary of the creation of the Peak District National Park. "Futurama" was Armitage's response to the 2021 Cop26 conference held in Glasgow, and he said of it "I was trying to chart the peculiar dream-like state we seem to be in, where the rules and natural laws of the old world feel to be in flux". In November 2019 Armitage announced that he would donate his salary as poet laureate to create the Poetry School's Laurel Prize for a collection of poems "with nature and the environment at their heart". The prize is to be run by the Poetry School.

Armitage's "Resistance", about the 2022 Russian invasion of Ukraine, was published in The Guardian on 12 March 2022. He called it "a refracted version of what is coming at us in obscene images through the news". Armitage read his "Only Human" at York Minster on 23 March 2022 during a service on the second annual National Day of Reflection to remember lives lost during the COVID-19 pandemic; the poem will be inscribed in a garden of remembrance at the Minster. For the Platinum Jubilee of Elizabeth II in June 2022, Armitage wrote "Queenhood". It was published in The Times on 3 June and as a signed limited-edition pamphlet sold through commercial outlets (ISBN 9780571379606), and on the royal.uk website. He published "Floral Tribute" on 13 September 2022, to commemorate the death of Elizabeth II; it takes the form of a double acrostic in which the initial letters of the lines of each of its two stanzas spell out "Elizabeth". Later that day he explained and read the poem on BBC News at Ten. To celebrate the centenary of the BBC, Armitage wrote "Transmission Report", which was broadcast on The One Show on 24 October 2022, read by a cast of BBC celebrities including Brian Cox, Michael Palin, Mary Berry and Chris Packham, accompanied by the BBC Concert Orchestra.

Armitage wrote "The Making of the Flying Scotsman (a phantasmagoria)" to mark the centenary of the locomotive Flying Scotsman, which entered service on 24 February 1923. On World Poetry Day, 21 March 2023, he released his "Plum Tree Among the Skyscrapers", the first of a series of 10 works to be commissioned by the National Trust and created by Armitage and his band LYR. For the coronation of Charles III and Camilla on 6 May 2023, Armitage wrote "An Unexpected Guest", telling the tale of a woman invited to attend the coronation in Westminster Abbey, and quoting from Samuel Pepys' diary entry recording the coronation of Charles II in 1661. In July 2023, Armitage spent time on Spitsbergen at the British Antarctic Survey's Ny-Ålesund research station, and wrote a group of poems relating to his visit. "The Summit" was published in The Guardian in October 2023, ahead of a series of four BBC Radio 4 programmes called Poet Laureate in the Arctic, broadcast from 10 October 2023. "Polaris" was the lyric used for BBC Radio 3's 2023 Carol Competition: Armitage said: "I was hoping to write something that might appeal to people of different backgrounds and different ages, with a narrative and maybe a slight nursery rhyme or nonsense feel to it, but with a serious and timely message at its heart. I don't think there are any other carols that begin with the words 'The police…!'".

"Megalosaurus" celebrates the 200th anniversary of the naming of the megalosaurus in 1825, and was commissioned by the Oxford University Museum of Natural History. "Hinge" forms part of a collaboration with sculptor Anthony Gormley, commissioned by Trinity College, Oxford: the poem is displayed in relief on a rusting metal door which leads into the college grounds from Parks Road and unveiled in March 2025. His Majesty's Prison and Probation Service commissioned "A Life In The Day Of" as part of a March 2025 campaign aiming to recruit probation officers with life experience, the way Armitage's father had joined the service; Armitage drew on his own memories of work as a probation officer. Portsmouth City Council commissioned "The Theatre of the Sea", which is cast in brass letters and embedded in the sea defence wall at Southsea, unveiled in April 2025; Armitage said it was "a great honour and a wonderful kind of reunion" to write a poem for the city where he studied for his geography degree. "The Definition of a Town" was commissioned by Kirklees Council and will be inlaid in the pavement of a New Street in Huddersfield. "In Retrospect" was commissioned by Historic Royal Palaces to mark the 80th anniversary, in May 2025, of VE Day. "Help Yourself" was written for the New Statesman's special edition on child poverty, published on 22 May 2025. "The Loan", celebrating public libraries, was one of four poems Armitage wrote as part of a community project, Tenterhooks, in his home town of Marsden, which were published in a limited edition of 250 copies in July 2025. The Stockton and Darlington Railway opened on 27 September 1825, and Armitage's "The Longest Train in the World" celebrates the history of railways, commissioned as part of "Railway 200". Armitage read his specially commissioned "Bread of Heaven" at Queen Camilla's harvest festival service in Westminster Abbey on 16 October 2025. "Dear Pink Floyd" was commissioned for the 50th anniversary of the release of Pink Floyd's album Wish You Were Here: The Guardian's reviewer called it "a sprawling piece with no punctuation that reads like a mix between a fan letter and the ramblings of a religious devotee". "The Skywatchers" celebrates the 350th anniversary of the Royal Observatory, Greenwich in August 1675, which was celebrated at a gala event in November 2025.

"The Campaign" was written for World Cancer Day on 4 February 2026, celebrating the centenary of Yorkshire Cancer Research. Its reference to cancer as a dragon comes from a speech by Sir Harold Mackintosh, the charity's first general secretary, in 1926. "Ambition" celebrates the opening of Horizon, a youth centre in Grimsby, and makes reference to the character Grim from the 13th-century Havelok the Dane, for whom the town is named. "The Moon and The Zoo" was commissioned by the Zoological Society of London to mark its 200th anniversary in April 2026. ZSL also commissioned an animation, with Armitage reading his poem and images by Greg King. "Hidden Depths" is carved into steps in the new Waterfront urban park in Stockton-on-Tees which was opened on 20 June 2026, and celebrates the relationship between the town and the River Tees. "What is Art?" celebrates 80 years of the Arts Council and was published in the book Made in England: Art and Culture in Changing Times in July 2026. Armitage read "The Reprieve", about the August 2026 solar eclipse, on BBC Radio 4's Today programme on 13 August.

=== The laureate's library tour ===
In November 2019 Armitage announced that each spring for ten years he would spend a week touring five to seven libraries giving a one-hour poetry reading and perhaps introducing a guest poet. The libraries were to be selected in alphabetical order: in March 2020 he was to visit places or libraries with names starting with "A" or "B" (including the British Library), and so on until "W", "X", "Y" and "Z" in 2029. He comments: "The letter X will be interesting – does anywhere in the UK begin with X? I also want to find a way of including alphabet letters from other languages spoken in these islands such as Welsh, Urdu or Chinese, and to involve communities where English might not be the first language."

After a delay caused by the COVID-19 pandemic, the first tour took place in 2021. Armitage read in various library buildings for a remote, online, live audience, beginning at Ashby-de-la-Zouch on 26 April and continuing to Belper with Helen Mort; Aberdeen with Mag Dixon; Bacup with Clare Shaw; Bootle with Amina Atiq and Eira Murphy; the British Library with Theresa Lola and Joelle Taylor; and Abington, where he officially opened the volunteer-run library on Saturday 1 May.

The 2022 tour visited libraries with initials C, D, and Welsh Ch and DD. Between 24 March and 1 April Armitage read at Chadderton with Keisha Thompson, Fateha Alam and Lawdy Karim; at Carmarthen with Ifor ap Glyn; at Clevedon with Phoebe Stuckes; at Colyton with Elizabeth-Jane Burnett; at Chatham with Patience Agbabi; at Cambridge University Library with Imtiaz Dharker; at Clydebank with Kathleen Jamie and Tawona Sitholé; and at Taigh Chearsabhagh on North Uist with Kevin MacNeil.

The 2023 tour visited libraries with initials E, F and G from 17 to 23 March. Armitage launched the tour at Exeter library, appearing with his band Land Yacht Regatta. He then read with Jane Lovell, winner of the 2021 Ginkgo Prize, at Glastonbury library; solo at Eastbourne library; with Laurel Prize-winner Matt Howard and Foyle Young Poet Jenna Hunt at Fakenham library; with Hanan Issa at Gladstone's Library in Hawarden; and with Canal Laureate Roy McFarlane and representatives of Theatre Porto and Boaty Theatre Company at Ellesmere Port library.

The 2024 tour visited libraries with initials H to K from 5 to 12 March. The launch event was held at Harlesden library, where Somali poet Asha Lul Mohamud Yusuf and her translator Clare Pollard read from her award-winning The Sea Migrations: Tahriib. Kent libraries hosted an event where Armitage joined the reading group in HM Prison East Sutton Park. At Haverfordwest library, Armitage read alongside poet, novelist and playwright Owen Sheers and Pushcart Prize nominee Bethany Handley. At The Hive, Worcester, a joint public and academic library and archive centre, Armitage read with Amelie Simon, Worcestershire's Young Poet Laureate. Armitage then visited Kirkcudbright library, to read with Lydia McMillan, one of the Scottish Poetry Library's Next Generation Young Makars in 2022, and the final event of the tour, in Haltwhistle library, celebrated 100 years of Northumberland's library service and ten years of Northumberland National Park's status as an International Dark Sky Park, with Katrina Porteous and the National Park's writer-in-residence Sheree Mack.

The 2025 tour visited libraries with initials L and M, from 3 to 11 March. It began at Library@theGrange, a small library in Blackpool's Grange Park estate, where Armitage appeared with spoken word artist and punk poet Toria Garbutt At Letchworth Library he was joined by Cia Mangat, and at Morriston Hospital library in Swansea, Wales, he appeared with Welsh poet and activist Menna Elfyn. He visited Liskeard Library in Cornwall, alongside Pascale Petit, helping to celebrate the library's refurbishment of this listed building. Armitage then returned to his home village to give two solo readings at Marsden Library, housed in the former Mechanics' Institute building. For the final event of the tour Armitage visited the Linen Hall Library, the oldest library in Belfast, Northern Ireland, appearing with Leontia Flynn.

The 2026 tour visited libraries with initials N to P between 25 February and 6 March, with a trip to Orkney in May. It began at North Ormesby community hub and library, in Middlesbrough, where Armitage was accompanied by Kate Fox, and he continued on the same day to the volunteer-run Newby and Scalby Library and Information Centre, near Scarborough with Khadijah Ibrahiim. He visited The Nest, a new library in Thamesmead, south east London, with Rachel Long; Nottingham Central Library, in its new building (opened 2023), with Cara Thompson; and Portsmouth Central Library, celebrating its 50th anniversary and the centenary of Portsmouth's city status, with Maggie Sawkins. He crossed to Northern Ireland to read at Newcastle in County Down with Dean Browne. In May, Armitage visits Orkney Library and Archive, Scotland's oldest public library, in Kirkwall.

=== Performing arts ===
Armitage is the author of five stage plays, including Mister Heracles, a version of Euripides' The Madness of Heracles. The Last Days of Troy premiered at Shakespeare's Globe in June 2014. He was commissioned in 1996 by the National Theatre in London to write Eclipse for the National Connections series, a play inspired by the real-life disappearance of Lindsay Rimer from Hebden Bridge in 1994, and set at the time of the 1999 solar eclipse in Cornwall.

Most recently Armitage wrote the libretto for Scottish composer Stuart MacRae's opera The Assassin Tree, based on a Greek myth recounted in The Golden Bough. The opera premiered at the 2006 Edinburgh International Festival before moving to the Royal Opera House, Covent Garden, London. Saturday Night (Century Films, BBC2, 1996) – wrote and narrated a 50-minute poetic commentary to a documentary about nightlife in Leeds, directed by Brian Hill. In 2010, Armitage walked the 264-mile Pennine Way, walking south from Scotland to Derbyshire. Along the route he stopped to give poetry readings, often in exchange for donations of money, food or accommodation, despite the rejection of the free life seen in his 1993 poem "Hitcher", and has written a book about his journey, Walking Home.

In 2007 he released an album of songs co-written with the musician Craig Smith, under the band name The Scaremongers.

In 2016 the arts programme 14–18 NOW commissioned a series of poems by Simon Armitage as part of a five-year programme of new artwork created specifically to mark the centenary of the First World War. The poems are a response to six aerial or panoramic photographs of battlefields from the archive of the Imperial War Museum in London. The poetry collection Still premiered at the Norfolk & Norwich Festival and has been published in partnership with Enitharmon Press.

In 2019 he was commissioned by Sky Arts to create an epic poem and film The Brink as one of 50 projects in "Art 50" looking at British Identity in the light of Brexit. The Brink looked at the British relationship with Europe, as envisioned from the closest point of the mainland to the rest of the continent – Kent.

In 2020 and 2021 Armitage produced a podcast, The Poet Laureate Has Gone to His Shed, also broadcast on BBC Radio 4, in which, while working on the medieval poem The Owl and the Nightingale, he invited a series of 20 guests to talk to him in his garden writing-shed; a third series of eight episodes was broadcast in 2023. In 2025 Armitage announced that as the BBC were not planning to commission any further series, he planned to relaunch it as a podcast with another broadcaster.

Armitage worked with Brian Hill on Where Did The World Go?, a "pandemic poem" that "examines life and loss in lockdown and binds the whole narrative with a new, overarching poem" and was shown on BBC Two in June 2021. In December 2020, he was featured walking from Ravenscar, along the old Cinder Track, a disused railway line, past Boggle Hole to Robin Hood's Bay, in the Winter Walks series on BBC Four. In August 2022 Armitage presented Larkin Revisited, a BBC Radio 4 series commemorating Philip Larkin's centenary, examining a single Larkin poem in each of the ten episodes. In November 2022 Armitage was the narrator in a performance of The Owl and the Nigtingale on BBC Radio 4 in with Maxine Peake (owl) and Rachael Stirling (nightingale).

== Personal life ==
Armitage lives in the Holme Valley, West Yorkshire, close to his family home in Marsden. His first wife was Alison Tootell: they married in 1991. He then married radio producer Sue Roberts; they have a daughter, Emmeline, born in 2000. Emmeline won the 2017 SLAMbassadors national youth poetry slam for 13–18-year-olds. Continuing in both her father's and grandfather's tradition, she is a member of the National Youth Theatre and a singer.

Armitage is a supporter of his local football team, Huddersfield Town, and refers to it many times in his book All Points North (1996). He is also a birdwatcher.

== Music ==
Armitage is the first poet laureate who is also a disc jockey. He is a music fan, especially of The Smiths. During what his wife Sue described as "a bit of a midlife crisis", Armitage and his college friend Craig Smith founded the band The Scaremongers. Their only album, Born in a Barn, was released in 2010. Armitage is a member of the band LYR (Land Yacht Regatta), alongside singer-songwriter Richard Walters and producer Patrick J Pearson. The band signed to Mercury KX, part of Decca Records. They released their debut album, Call in the Crash Team, in 2020 and a single, "Winter Solstice", in 2021 featuring Wendy Smith from Prefab Sprout.

In May 2020 Armitage was the guest on BBC Radio 4's Desert Island Discs. His choice of music included David Bowie's "Moonage Daydream"; his chosen book was the Oxford English Dictionary, and his luxury was a tennis ball.

== Awards and distinctions ==
=== Awards ===
- 1988 Eric Gregory Award
- 1989 Zoom! made a Poetry Book Society Choice
- 1992 Forward Poetry Prize for Kid
- 1993 Sunday Times Young Writer of the Year
- 1994 Lannan Award
- 1995 Forward Poetry Prize for The Dead Sea Poems
- 1998 Yorkshire Post Book of the Year for All Points North
- 2003 BAFTA winner
- 2003 Ivor Novello Award for song-writing
- 2004 Fellow of Royal Society of Literature
- 2005 Spoken Word Award (Gold) for The Odyssey
- 2006 Royal Television Society Documentary Award for Out of the Blue
- 2008 The Not Dead (C4, Century Films) Mental Health in the Media Documentary Film Winner
- 2010 Seeing Stars made a Poetry Book Society Choice
- 2010 Keats-Shelley Prize for Poetry
- 2010 Appointed a Commander of the Order of the British Empire (CBE) in the Queen's Birthday Honours List, for services to literature
- 2012 The Death of King Arthur made Poetry Book Society Choice
- 2012 Hay Festival Medal for Poetry
- 2012 T. S. Eliot Prize, shortlist, The Death of King Arthur
- 2015 Oxford professor of poetry (4-year appointment)
- 2017 PEN America Poetry in Translation Prize for Pearl: A New Verse Translation
- 2018 Queen's Gold Medal for Poetry "for his body of work"
- 2019 Poet Laureate of the United Kingdom, appointed for 10 years
- 2025 Freedom of the City of London
- 2025 Violani Landi International Poetry Award, Alma Mater Studiorum - Università di Bologna

=== Honorary degrees ===
- 1996 Doctor of Letters, University of Portsmouth
- 1996 Honorary Doctorate, University of Huddersfield
- 2009 Honorary Doctorate, Sheffield Hallam University
- 2011 Doctor of the university, The Open University
- 2015 Honorary Doctor of Letters, University of Leeds

== Published works ==
=== Poetry collections ===
- Zoom! (Bloodaxe Books, 1989)
- Kid (Faber & Faber, 1992)
- Xanadu (Bloodaxe Books, 1992)
- Book of Matches (Faber & Faber, 1993)
- The Dead Sea Poems (Faber & Faber, 1995)
- CloudCuckooLand (Faber & Faber, 1997)
- Killing Time (Faber & Faber, 1999)
- Selected Poems (Faber & Faber, 2001, contains poems from 6 earlier books)
- The Universal Home Doctor (Faber & Faber, 2002)
- Travelling Songs (Faber & Faber, 2002)
- The Shout: Selected Poems (Harcourt, 2005)
- Tyrannosaurus Rex Versus The Corduroy Kid (Faber & Faber, 2006)
- The Not Dead (Pomona Books, 2008)
- Out of the Blue (Enitharmon Press, 2008)
- Seeing Stars (Faber & Faber, 2010)
- Black Roses: The Killing of Sophie Lancaster (Pomona Books, 2012)
- Stanza Stones (Enitharmon Press, 2013)
- Paper Aeroplane, Selected Poems 1989–2014 (Faber & Faber, 2014, contains poems from earlier collections)
- Still – A Poetic Response to Photographs of the Somme Battlefield (Enitharmon Press, 2016)
- The Unaccompanied (Faber & Faber, 2017)
- Sandettie Light Vessel Automatic (Faber & Faber, 2019)
- Magnetic Field: The Marsden Poems (Faber & Faber, 2020, contains poems from earlier collections)

=== Translation ===
- Homer's Odyssey (2006)
- The Death of King Arthur (2012), a translation of the Alliterative Morte Arthure
- Pearl (2017)
- Sir Gawain and The Green Knight (2018) [2007], new revised translation, illustrated by Clive Hicks-Jenkins
- The Owl and the Nightingale (2021)
- Gilgamesh: A New Verse Translation (April 14, 2026) Publisher: Liveright; ISBN 978-1631496684

=== Pamphlets and limited editions ===
- Human Geography (Smith/Doorstop Books, 1986)
- Distance Between Stars (Wide Skirt, 1987)
- The Walking Horses (Slow Dancer, 1988)
- Around Robinson (Slow Dancer, 1991)
- The Anaesthetist (Clarion, Illustrated by Velerii Mishin, 1994)
- Five Eleven Ninety Nine (Clarion, Illustrated by Toni Goffe, 1995)
- Machinery of Grace: A Tribute to Michael Donaghy (Poetry Society, 2005), Contributor
- The North Star (University of Aberdeen, 2006), Contributor
- The Motorway Service Station as a Destination in its Own Right (Smith/Doorstop Books, 2010)
- In Memory of Water – The Stanza Stones poems. (Wood engravings by Hilary Paynter. Fine Press Poetry, 2013)
- Considering the Poppy – (Wood engravings by Chris Daunt. Fine Press Poetry, 2014)
- Waymarkings – (Wood engravings by Hilary Paynter. Fine Press Poetry, 2016)
- New Cemetery (Published by propolis, 2017)
- Exit the Known World – (Wood engravings by Hilary Paynter. Fine Press Poetry, 2018)
- Flit – (Poetry and photographs by Simon Armitage. Yorkshire Sculpture Park, 2018, 40th anniversary edition)
- Hansel and Gretel – (A new narrative poem by Simon Armitage, illustrated by Clive Hicks-Jenkins. Design for Today, 2019)
- Gymnasium – (Drawings by Antony Gormley. Fine Press Poetry, 2019)
- Tract – (Paintings by Hughie O'Donoghue. Fine Press Poetry, 2021)
- The Bed – (Painting by Alison Watt. Fine Press Poetry, 2021)
- 70 Notices – (A celebration to mark 70 years of The Peak District as a National Park. Frontispiece by David Robertson. Fine Press Poetry, 2021)
- Queenhood – (A poem for the Queen's Platinum Jubilee. Faber, 2022)
- Tribute: Three Commemorative Poems (Faber, 2022)
- LX – (A signed limited edition pamphlet to celebrate Armitage's 60th birthday. Faber, 2023)
- The Cryosphere (Faber, 2023)
- Blossomise (Faber/National Trust, 2024)

=== Books ===
==== As editor ====
- Penguin Modern Poets: Book 5 (with Sean O'Brien and Tony Harrison, 1995)
- The Penguin Book of Poetry from Britain and Ireland since 1945 (with Robert Crawford, 1998)
- Short and Sweet: 101 Very Short Poems (1999)
- Ted Hughes Poems: Selected by Simon Armitage (2000)
- The Poetry of Birds (with Tim Dee, 2009)

==== As author ====
- Moon Country (with Glyn Maxwell, 1996)
- Eclipse (1997)
- All Points North (1998)
- Mister Heracles After Euripides (2000)
- Little Green Man (2001)
- The White Stuff (2004)
- King Arthur in the East Riding (Pocket Penguins, 2005)
- Jerusalem (2005)
- The Twilight Readings (2008)
- Gig: The Life and Times of a Rock-star Fantasist (2008)
- Walking Home: Travels with a Troubadour on the Pennine Way (2012)
- Walking Away: Further Travels with a Troubadour on the South West Coast Path (2015)
- Mansions in the Sky (2017)
- Never Good with Horses: Assembled Lyrics (2023)

== Selected television and radio works ==
- Second Draft from Saga Land – six programmes for BBC Radio 3 on W. H. Auden and Louis MacNeice.
- Eyes of a Demigod – on Victor Grayson commissioned by BBC Radio 3.
- The Amherst Myth – on Emily Dickinson, for BBC Radio 4.
- Points of Reference – on the history of navigation and orientation, for BBC Radio 4.
- From Salford to Jericho – A verse drama for BBC Radio 4.
- To Bahia and Beyond – Five travelogue features in verse with Glyn Maxwell from Brazil and the Amazon for BBC Radio 3.
- The Bayeux Tapestry – A six-part dramatisation, with Geoff Young, for BBC Radio 3.
- Saturday Night (1996) – Century Films/BBC TV
- A Tree Full of Monkeys (2002) – commissioned by BBC Radio 3, with Zoviet France.
- The Odyssey (2004) – A three-part dramatisation for BBC Radio 4.
- Writing the City (2005) – commissioned by BBC Radio 3.
- Sir Gawain and the Green Knight (2010) – BBC documentary
- Gods and Monsters — Homer's Odyssey (2010) – BBC documentary
- The Making of King Arthur (2010) – BBC documentary
- The Pendle Witch Child (2011) – BBC documentary, examining the role of Jennet Device in the Pendle Witch Trials
- Black Roses: The Killing of Sophie Lancaster (2011), consisting of poems telling the story of Sophie Lancaster's life, together with the personal recollections of her mother.
- The Last Days of Troy (2015) – A two-part dramatisation for BBC Radio 4.
- The Brink (2018) – a meditation on the British relationship with Europe in the light of Brexit. For Sky Arts.
- The Poet Laureate Has Gone to His Shed (2020, 2021 and 2023) – BBC Radio 4 series and podcast, three series of 12, 9 and 8 episodes
- Poet Laureate in the Arctic (2023) – BBC Radio 4 four-part series.
- My Poetry and Other Animals (2024–2025) – BBC Radio 4 10-part series.

== See also ==
- AQA Anthology
