= Marsden, West Yorkshire =

Village in West Yorkshire, England

Coordinates: 53.6011°N 1.9267°W

Marsden
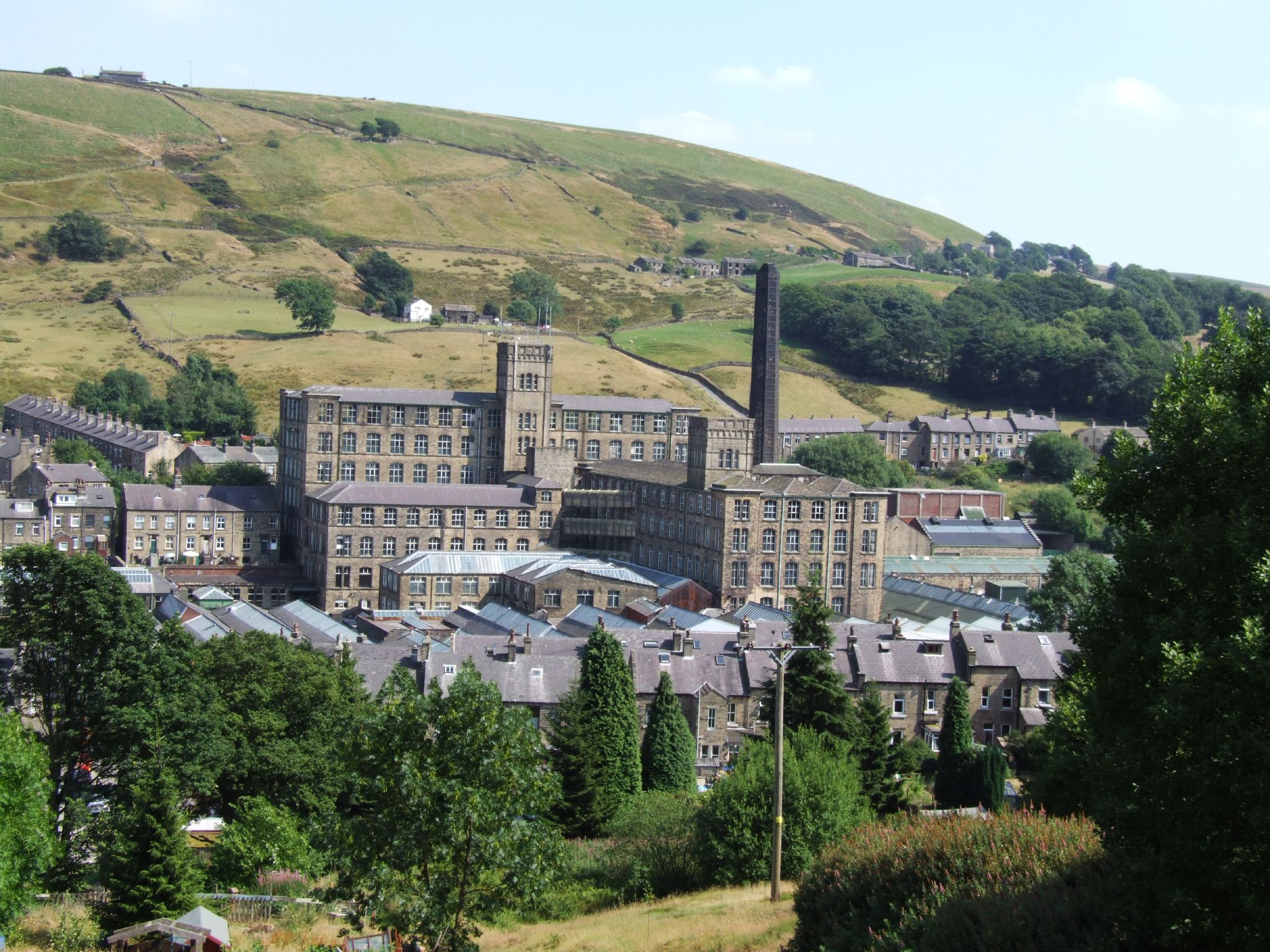
- Marsden Mill in 2006

- Location within West Yorkshire
- Population: 3,692
- OS grid reference: SE048116
  - London: 160 mi (260 km) SE
- Metropolitan borough: Kirklees
- Metropolitan county: West Yorkshire
- Region: Yorkshire and the Humber
- Country: England
- Sovereign state: United Kingdom
- Post town: HUDDERSFIELD
- Postcode district: HD7
- Dialling code: 01484
- Police: West Yorkshire
- Fire: West Yorkshire
- Ambulance: Yorkshire
- UK Parliament: Colne Valley

Marsden is a large village in the Colne Valley, in the metropolitan borough of Kirklees, West Yorkshire, England. It is in the South Pennines close to the Peak District which lies to the south. The village is 7 miles (11 km) west of Huddersfield at the confluence of the River Colne and Wessenden Brook. It was an important centre for the production of woollen cloth. In 2021, the village had a population of 3,692.

== History ==
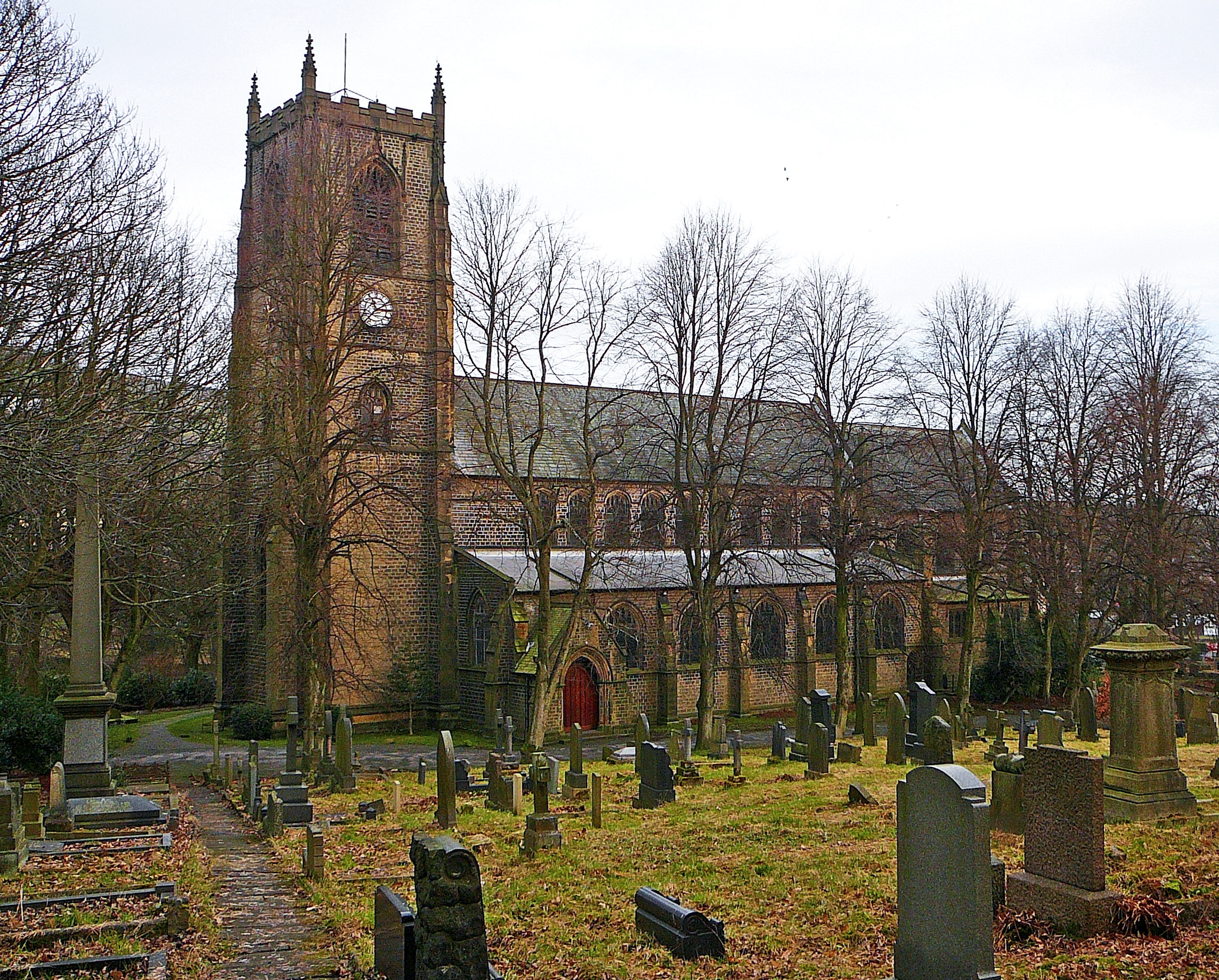
St Bartholomew's Church, 2009

The name Marsden derives from the Old English mercelsdenu meaning 'boundary marker valley', referring to the town's position near the old Lancashire and Yorkshire border.Although later medieval spellings of the name resemble Old English mersc ('marsh'), linguistic analysis indicates this is a case of scribal confusion rather than the true origin, as mersc could not have produced the palatalised Marche- forms found in historical records of the name; the same derivation is paralleled by the Lancashire village of Marsden, which shows similar early spellings.

Marsden grew wealthy in the 19th century from the production of woollen cloth. It is still home to Bank Bottom Mill, later known as Marsden Mill, and to John Edward Crowther Ltd, formerly one of the largest mills in Yorkshire. The Crowthers moved to Marsden in 1876, beginning a long and profitable association with cloth manufacturing in the town.

During the 1930s, Bank Bottom Mill covered an area of 14 acres (5.7 ha), employed 680 looms and provided employment for 1,900 workers.

The Church of St Bartholomew was completed in 1899, although the nave and aisle had been in use from 1895, when the previous chapel was demolished. The tower was built in 1911 and the Parochial Hall in 1924 (with an extension in 1978). The church has a peal of 10 bells.

Production of woollen cloth at Bank Bottom Mill ceased in 2003, with the loss of 244 jobs.

=== Governance ===
Marsden was formerly a township and chapelry in the parishes of Almondbury and Huddersfield. On 26 March 1898 Marsden became a civil parish formed from "Marsden in Almondbury" and "Marsden in Huddersfield", on 1 April 1937 the parish was abolished to form Colne Valley Urban District. In 1931 the parish had a population of 5,723.

== Geography ==
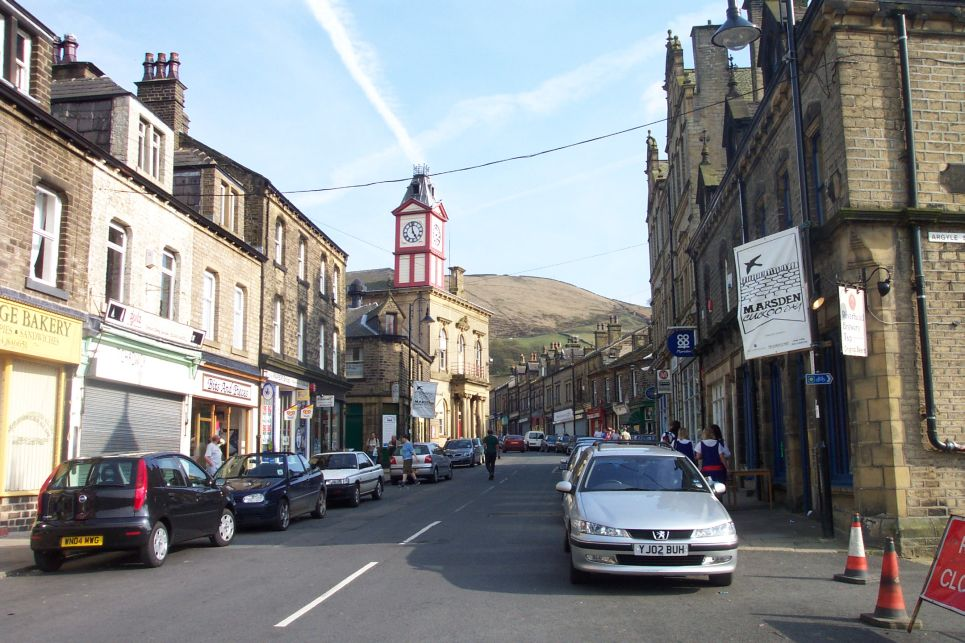
Peel Street, including the Mechanics Institute, 2004

Marsden is the last significant settlement on the West Yorkshire side of the Standedge Pennine crossing into Greater Manchester. The village is in the southern edge of the South Pennines, with the boundary of the Peak District National Park to the south. It is surrounded on three sides by the moorland of Marsden and Meltham Moors with Saddleworth Moor nearby. Marsden has low level access only from the east along the Colne Valley.

The Marsden Moor Estate, which surrounds Marsden to the west and south, includes several reservoirs; it is in the care of the National Trust, which is developing techniques to rehabilitate the moor. Butterley Reservoir with its distinctive spillway is near Marsden inside the Peak District National Park. The Peak District Boundary Walk runs across the moors and into Marsden.

In chronostratigraphy, the British sub-stage of the Carboniferous period, the Marsdenian derives its name from Marsden.

== Transport ==
=== Road ===
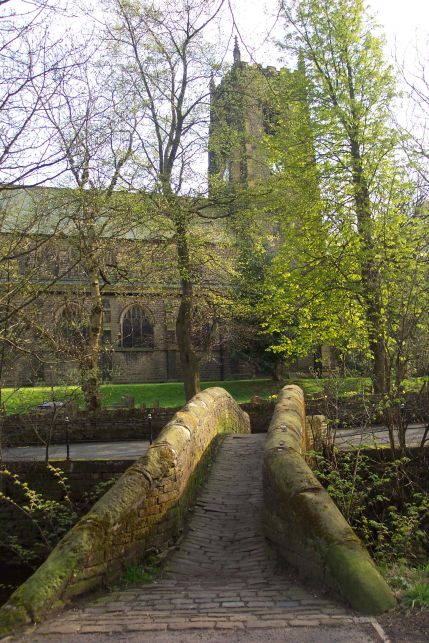
Mellor Bridge, one of Marsden's two packhorse bridges, with St Bartholomew's Church in the background, 2004

Several generations of tracks and roads have crossed the moors near Marsden. Mellor Bridge and Close Gate Bridge are both packhorse bridges.

The A62 road between Huddersfield and Oldham passes through the village and the Standedge cutting some 2.5 miles (4 km) to the west. The road between Oldham and Huddersfield, especially the stretch between Marsden and Diggle, was named the fourth most dangerous road in Britain in 2003-2005.

=== Railway ===
Marsden railway station is sited on the Huddersfield line. Services are operated by TransPennine Express to locations including Huddersfield, Manchester Piccadilly, Leeds and Hull.

=== Buses ===
Local bus services are operated primarily by First West Yorkshire and Stagecoach Manchester. Routes run to Huddersfield, Honley, Slaithwaite, Saddleworth and Oldham.

There was a tram service from Huddersfield to Marsden between 1914 and 1938 and a trolley bus service from 1938 to 1963. After the Second World War, extremely cheap fares (1d. return) allowed school children from Huddersfield access to the moors around Marsden during summer holidays.

=== Canal ===
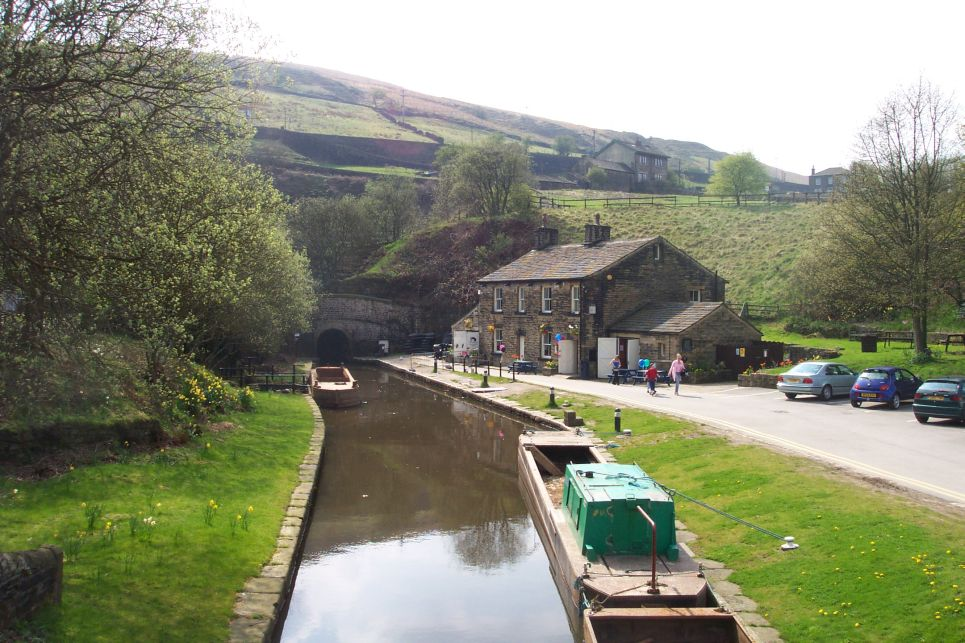
Tunnel End, the eastern entrance to Standedge Canal Tunnel, 2004

The Huddersfield Narrow Canal and the Huddersfield-Manchester railway enter the parallel rail and canal Standedge Tunnels about half a mile (0.8 km) to the west of the village centre.

== Mountain rescue ==
The Holme Valley Mountain Rescue Team has its headquarters at Marsden Fire Station from where the volunteer team provides rescue cover for surrounding moorland areas and assists West Yorkshire Police with searches for missing people. The team was founded in 1965 and was based in Meltham before relocating in 2005.

== Sport ==
Marsden Football Club, are members of the Yorkshire Amateur Football League and play their home matches at the Fall Lane ground.

Above the village at Hemplow, on Mount Road is a sports ground that hosts Marsden's cricket, golf and tennis clubs, as well as Hemplow Bowling Club. Marsden golf course was created in 1920 and was designed by the legendary Alister MacKenzie who also designed the famous Augusta National, home of the Masters, and possibly the most famous golf course in the world. The cricket club, formed in 1865, runs two teams in the Drake's Huddersfield Cricket League and teams in five age groups in the Huddersfield Junior Cricket League.

In 2010 Marsden gained Walkers are Welcome status in recognition of its well-maintained footpaths, facilities and information for walkers and ramblers.

== Culture ==
Marsden Silver Prize Band is the local silver band. The village hosts festivals and cultural events throughout the year. Marsden Cuckoo Day, a day-long festival held annually in Spring (April), holds clog dancing, a duck race, music, a procession and a "cuckoo walk". The Marsden Jazz Festival is held every October, and the winter Imbolc Festival, in which the 'triumph of the Green Man' (who represents the coming spring), over Jack Frost (the winter) is celebrated with fire juggling and giant puppets. Marsden is the home of Mikron Theatre Company, the world's only professional theatre company to tour by narrowboat.

Marsden's 'Cuckoo Day festival' is named after a local legend of the Marsden Cuckoo:

"Many years ago the people of Marsden were aware that when the cuckoo arrived, so did the Spring and sunshine. They tried to keep Spring forever, by building a tower around the Cuckoo. Unfortunately, as the last stones were about to be laid, away flew the cuckoo. If only they'd built the tower one layer higher. As the legend says, it 'were nobbut just wun course too low'."

Marsden hosts the Pennine Beer Festival:

The Pennine Beer Festival held its inaugural event in 2025 as a fundraiser for Marsden Community Trust which owns and administers the Mechanics Hall in the village. The second Pennine Beer Festival is running in 2026.

=== Filming location ===
Marsden is popular as a location for television and film productions. These productions have used the village:

- Where the Heart Is (ITV)
- Last of the Summer Wine (BBC)
- Eleventh Hour (ITV)
- Housewife, 49 (ITV)
- Wokenwell (ITV)
- The League of Gentlemen (BBC)
- Between Two Women (film)
- In the Flesh (BBC)
- Remember Me (BBC)
- A Monster Calls
- Walk Like a Panther
- Brassic
- The Stolen Girl
- Sink or Swim (BBC)

== Notable people ==
Marsden was the birthplace of Henrietta Thompson, the mother of General James Wolfe who consolidated British power in North America by taking Quebec from the French in 1759.

Marsden is also where Enoch Taylor was buried. Enoch Taylor was the blacksmith who built the first automatic croppers. The name Enoch was used for the hammers that the Luddites used to smash them. The Luddites used the slogan "Enoch made them, and Enoch shall break them."

- Simon Armitage, born 1963, Poet Laureate and playwright, grew up in the village and has published several poems about the village (Magnetic Field)
- Samuel Laycock, 1826–1893, dialect poet, was born at Intake Head, Pule Hill
- Dora Marsden, 1882–1960, English suffragette, was born in the village

== See also ==
- Listed buildings in Colne Valley (western area)
