= Poet Laureate of the United Kingdom =

Honorary position in the United Kingdom

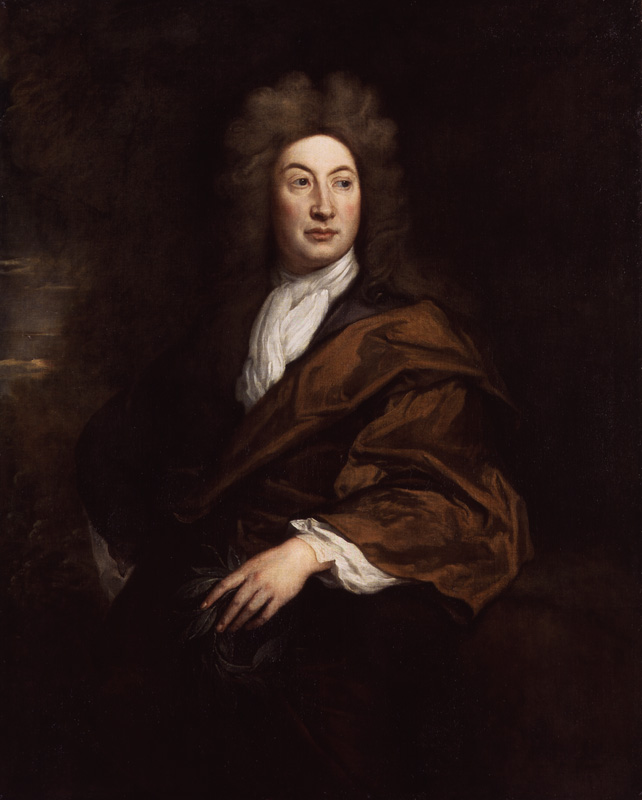
John Dryden, the first poet laureate, (1667-1689)

The British poet laureate is an honorary position appointed by the monarch of the United Kingdom on the advice of the prime minister. The role does not entail any specific duties, but there is an expectation that the holder will write verse for significant national occasions. The laureateship dates to 1616 when a pension was provided to Ben Jonson, but the first official laureate was John Dryden, appointed in 1668 by Charles II. On the death of Alfred, Lord Tennyson, who held the post between November 1850 and October 1892, there was a break of four years as a mark of respect; Tennyson's laureate poems "Ode on the Death of the Duke of Wellington" and "The Charge of the Light Brigade" were particularly cherished by the Victorian public. Four poets—Thomas Gray, Samuel Rogers, Walter Scott and Philip Larkin—turned down the laureateship. Historically the poet laureate was appointed for an unfixed term and typically for life, but since 1999 the term has been ten years. The holder of the position as at 2026 is Simon Armitage who succeeded Carol Ann Duffy in May 2019 after her ten years in office.

== Background ==
The origins of the British poet laureateship date back to 1616 when James I of England granted a pension to the writer Ben Jonson. Although there were subsequent court poets it was not until 1668, and the appointment of John Dryden by Charles II, that the post was made an established royal office within the royal household. Dryden, who had been appointed following the success of his 1667 poem Annus Mirabilis, was dismissed from office in 1689 following the accession of the Protestant William III and Mary II to the throne. Dryden, a Catholic convert, refused to take the Oath of Allegiance to the new monarchs and he was dismissed from the laureateship—the only holder to have been removed from office.

Dryden's successor, Thomas Shadwell, was appointed in 1689 for life. He introduced the custom of producing poems for the new year and the monarch's birthday, which became one of the key duties of the position. After the appointment of William Wordsworth in 1843 the duties settled into an expectation, not requirement, for major court and national occasions. Alfred, Lord Tennyson held the post between November 1850 and October 1892. According to Andrew Motion and Hilary Laurie, Tennyson "gave the poet laureateship new status and significance" with works such as "Ode on the Death of the Duke of Wellington" and "The Charge of the Light Brigade". On his death the post was left vacant as a mark of respect; a new laureate was not appointed until four years later, with the appointment of Alfred Austin in January 1896. As at 2015 the position is an honorary one, and the office holder is left to decide on which occasions they will produce poetry. Following Dryden's dismissal from the post, the laureateship was held for life by all successors until Motion was appointed in 1999 for a fixed term of ten years; his successor, Carol Ann Duffy, was also appointed on the same fixed term. Duffy was the first female poet to hold the role, and the first Scot.

After Shadwell's selection the laureate was appointed by the Lord Chamberlain, on the monarch's instructions. Since the appointment of Henry James Pye in 1790, the prime minister has recommended which candidate to appoint. For the appointment of Duffy the Department for Culture, Media and Sport (DCMS) undertook a consultation of academics and literary organisations to draw up a short list of recommendations which they presented to the prime minister. He, in conjunction with the Cabinet Office, then submitted the name to the Queen for approval.

Dryden's salary for the laureateship was £200 per year. In 1630 Charles I added an annual "butt of Canary wine", (Note: A butt of wine measured 126 gallons (572.80 litres).) although this was later discontinued in place of the monetary equivalent. When Ted Hughes was appointed, he rekindled the tradition, and received 720 bottles of sherry. Since Motion's appointment the DCMS provided an annual honorarium of £5,750; Motion also received an additional £19,000 for his work in education. With Duffy's appointment, the salary returned to £5,750 and the barrel of sherry.

== Poets laureate ==
Poet laureate	Portrait	Birth and death	Dates of laureateship	Appointed by	Length of tenure (years)	Ref.
John Dryden		1631–1700	13 April 1668 – January 1689	Charles II	20	
Thomas Shadwell		c. 1640–1692	9 March 1689 – 19 or 20 November 1692	William III and Mary II	3	
Nahum Tate		1652–1715	23 December 1692 – 30 July 1715	William III and Mary II	23	
Nicholas Rowe		1674–1718	1 August 1715 – 6 December 1718	George I	3	
Laurence Eusden		1688–1730	10 December 1718 – 27 September 1730	George I	12	
Colley Cibber		1671–1757	3 December 1730 – 12 December 1757	George II	27	
William Whitehead		1715–1785	19 December 1757 (Note: On the refusal of Thomas Gray.) – 14 April 1785	George II	27	
Thomas Warton		1728–1790	20 April 1785 – 21 May 1790	George III	5	
Henry James Pye		1745–1813	28 July 1790 – 11 August 1813	George III	23	
Robert Southey		1774–1843	12 August 1813 (Note: On the refusal of Walter Scott.) – 21 March 1843	George III	30	
William Wordsworth		1770–1850	6 April 1843 – 23 April 1850	Victoria	7	
Alfred, Lord Tennyson		1809–1892	19 November 1850 (Note: On the refusal of Samuel Rogers.) – 6 October 1892	Victoria	42	
Alfred Austin		1835–1913	1 January 1896 – 2 June 1913	Victoria	17	
Robert Bridges		1844–1930	25 July 1913 – 21 April 1930	George V	17	
John Masefield		1878–1967	9 May 1930 – 12 May 1967	George V	37	
Cecil Day-Lewis		1904–1972	2 January 1968 – 22 May 1972	Elizabeth II	4	
John Betjeman		1906–1984	20 October 1972 – 19 May 1984	Elizabeth II	12	
Ted Hughes		1930–1998	28 December 1984 – 28 October 1998	Elizabeth II	14	
Andrew Motion		1952–	19 May 1999 – 1 May 2009	Elizabeth II	10	
Carol Ann Duffy		1955–	1 May 2009 – 10 May 2019	Elizabeth II	10	
Simon Armitage		1963–	10 May 2019 – present	Elizabeth II	7	

== See also ==
- Children's Laureate

== Notes and references ==
=== Sources ===
- Bradford, Richard (2005). First Boredom Then Fear: The Life of Philip Larkin. London: Peter Owen. ISBN 0-7206-1147-4.
- Dryden, John; Malone, Edmond (1800). The Critical and Miscellaneous Prose Works of John Dryden: Now First Collected: with Notes and Illustrations. London: Cadell and Davies. ISBN 9780608383576. OCLC 642439986.
- Hammond, Paul; Hopkins, David (2014). The Poems of John Dryden: Volume Four: 1686–1696. Abingdon, Oxon: Routledge. ISBN 978-1-317-90536-3.
- Laurie, Hilary; Motion, Andrew (1999). Verses of the Poets Laureate: From John Dryden to Andrew Motion. London: Orion. ISBN 978-0-7528-1859-7.
- Nichol Smith, David (1950). John Dryden. Cambridge: CUP Archive. OCLC 2285804.
- Unwin, Tim (2005). Wine and the Vine: An Historical Geography of Viticulture and the Wine Trade. London: Routledge. ISBN 978-1-134-76192-0.
