= Butterley Reservoir =

Butterley Reservoir may refer to:

- Butterley Reservoir, Derbyshire, England
- Butterley Reservoir, West Yorkshire, England
