= Listed buildings in Colne Valley (western area) =

Colne Valley is an unparished area in the metropolitan borough of Kirklees, West Yorkshire, England. Colne Valley ward contains over 480 listed buildings that are recorded in the National Heritage List for England. Of these, twelve are listed at Grade II*, the middle of the three grades, and the others are at Grade II, the lowest grade.

This list contains the listed buildings in the western part of the ward, in which the biggest settlement is the large village of Marsden, and it includes the smaller settlements and districts of Bradshaw, Lingards Wood, Scammonden, and Wilberlee. Apart from Marsden, this part of the ward is almost completely rural, consisting of countryside and moorland. A high proportion of the listed buildings are farmhouses and farm buildings, almost all constructed in stone with roofs of stone slate, and containing mullioned windows. During the 19th century, the ward was involved in the textile industry, and the listed buildings associated with this are former weavers' houses and mills. The River Colne and the Huddersfield Narrow Canal pass through this part of the ward, and the listed buildings associated with these include bridges, canal milestones, former keepers' cottages, and a former warehouse. In the western part of the ward are the entrances to the Standedge Tunnels which carry the canal and the railway under the Pennines, and the portals leading to these are listed. The other listed buildings include houses and cottages and associated structures, churches and chapels and associated structures, guide posts and milestones, bridges, including three packhorse bridges, a set of water troughs, a former engine house serving the canal tunnel, a pinfold, a set of tenter posts, public houses, structures associated with Butterley Reservoir, a former mechanics' institute, an aqueduct and weir, and three memorials, two of them war memorials.

The listed buildings in the other parts of the ward can be found at Listed buildings in Colne Valley (central area) and Listed buildings in Colne Valley (eastern area)

== Key ==
Grade	Criteria
II*	Particularly important buildings of more than special interest
II	Buildings of national importance and special interest

== Buildings ==
Name and location	Photograph	Date	Notes	Grade
1, Slaithwaite Hall, Bents Lane, Lingards Wood; 53.61354°N 1.91708°W	—	Mid 15th century	The house was altered and extended in the 16th and 19th centuries. The early part is cruck framed, the later parts are in stone, the roof is in stone slate. There is evidence of doorways front and rear and a through passage (both blocked) The windows are a mixture of wood and stone mullions, and inside is one cruck truss. The cruck truss has been dated dendrochronologicaly to 1453 and the muntin screen top beam in the cross-wing to 1580.	II
8 Ainley Place, Wilberlee; 53.62939°N 1.90457°W	—	17th century	A stone house at the end of a terrace, it has a stone slate roof with moulded kneelers. There are two storeys, the ground floor back to earth. The doorway has quoins and a Tudor arched lintel, all in millstone grit, and the windows are mullioned.	II
11 Ainley Place, Wilberlee; 53.62920°N 1.90429°W	—	17th century	The house, which has been largely rebuilt, is in stone, partly rendered, with a stone slate roof and two storeys. The doorway has a millstone grit lintel, and the windows are mullioned.	II
Guide post, Mount Road; 53.58743°N 1.95138°W	—	17th century (probable)	The guide post is on the north side of Mount Road. It is an upright stone post, with markings that are illegible.	II
Higher Green Owlers; 53.61367°N 1.95926°W	—	17th century	A farmhouse and barn, later partly rebuilt, with quoins, and a stone slate roof with moulded kneelers on the barn. There are two storeys, and a later lean-to extension. In the main part is a lean-to porch and mullioned windows. The extension contains a doorway, probably re-set, with a quoined surround and an inscribed and dated Tudor arched lintel. In the barn is a modern garage door, over which is an inscribed lintel from a former doorway, and the barn also contains various other openings. To the east are the remains of a former brewery, and parts of it extend under the house.	II
Manor House; 53.59845°N 1.93440°W	—	17th century	The house, which has been altered, is in stone, partly rendered, and a stone slate roof. There are two storeys, and the front has three gables. In the centre is a doorway with a later porch. The windows are mullioned, with some mullions removed, most with hood moulds, and they include a ten-light window.	II
New Hey Farmhouse; 53.63704°N 1.92833°W		17th century	The farmhouse, later an activity centre, is in stone with large plinth stones, millstone grit quoins, and a stone slate roof with chamfered copings and moulded kneelers. There are two storeys, the original doorway, now partly blocked, has a chamfered and quoined surround and a millstone grit lintel, and the later doorways have stone surrounds. There is a single-light window, and the other windows are mullioned.	II
Green Top Farmhouse and Cottage; 53.59397°N 1.93669°W	—	1671	The building is in stone, rendered on the front, and has a stone slate roof, the northeast gable with chamfered copings on moulded kneelers. There are two storeys, and a single-storey lean-to extension. The doorway has a chamfered surround and a deep lintel inscribed with the date and initials. There are some single-light windows, most windows are mullioned, and over the ground floor windows is a continuous hood mould with motifs at the ends.	II
Clark Hill Farmhouse and Cottage; 53.59616°N 1.93510°W	—	1674	The farmhouse and cottage are in one range and are in stone, partly rendered, with quoins and a stone slate roof. There are two storeys, and a lean-to extension to the north. The house has a doorway with a quoined and chamfered surround, and a Tudor arched lintel in millstone grit inscribed with initials and the date. The windows in both parts are mullioned, with some mullions removed, and some lights blocked. There are hood moulds over the ground floor openings in the house.	II
4 Ainley Place, Wilberlee; 53.62960°N 1.90427°W	—	Late 17th century	A stone house at the end of a terrace, with quoins and a stone slate roof. There are two storeys, and a single-storey extension on the right. The doorway has a stone surround and the windows are mullioned.	II
5–6 Ainley Place, Wilberlee; 53.62953°N 1.90438°W	—	Late 17th century	A pair of houses in a terrace, the upper floor added later, they are in stone with a stone slate roof. There are two storeys, the ground floor back to earth. The doorways have surrounds in millstone grit; the doorway of No. 5 has tie-stones, and that of No. 6 has a large lintel with a shallow arch. The windows are mullioned.	II
Berry Greave; 53.60766°N 1.94421°W	—	1685	A cottage in a farm terrace that has been much altered, it is in rendered stone, with a stone slate roof and two storeys. On the front is a doorway and a modern casement window, with a hood mould above, and in the upper floor is a five-light mullioned window.	II
Berry Greave Farmhouse; 53.60764°N 1.94407°W	—	1685	The farmhouse is in a terrace, and has been much altered. It is in rendered stone, with some stone gutter brackets, and a stone slate roof. There are two storeys, and an extension outshut at the rear. The doorway has a chamfered surround and a deep lintel inscribed with initials and two dates. In the upper floor is a four-light mullioned window with two mullions removed, the other windows are modern casements, and there is a continuous hood mould over the ground floor openings.	II
Barn, New Hey Farm; 53.63712°N 1.92850°W	—	1693	The barn is in millstone grit with quoins, a stone slate roof with moulded kneelers on the northwest gable, and an outshut on the right. In the main part is a doorway with quoins and an oak lintel, and the doorway in the outshut has quoins and a chamfered surround. The other openings include vents and later windows.	II
15 Town Gate, Marsden; 53.60086°N 1.92872°W	—	Late 17th to early 18th century	The building, once two cottages, and later a public house, has been much altered. It is in stone, partly rendered, with a stone slate roof and two storeys. There are two doorways with chamfered surrounds, one is partly blocked and also has tie-stones and a deep lintel. Some windows are mullioned, and others date from the 19th century.	II
Close Gate Bridge; 53.60546°N 1.95805°W		17th or 18th century	A packhorse bridge over Haigh Clough, it is in stone and consists of a single arched span. The bridge has a string course, and a parapet with semicircular copings. Its internal width is about 4 feet 6 inches (1.37 m), and it is paved with setts. The bridge is also a scheduled monument.	II*
Mellor Bridge; 53.60166°N 1.93043°W		17th or 18th century	A packhorse bridge over the River Colne, it is in stone and consists of a single arch. The bridge has rounded copings and a narrow walkway paved with setts.	II*
17 Town Gate, Marsden; 53.60076°N 1.92893°W	—	Early 18th century	Two dwellings combined into one, it is in stone, partly rendered, chamfered on two corners, with quoins, a stone slate roof, and two storeys. The doorways have stone surrounds, there is a single-light window, and the other windows are mullioned.	II
Birks and barn 53.62745°N 1.91289°W	—	Early 18th century	A house, barn and cottage in one range, they are in millstone grit on a plinth, with stone slate roofs. The house has two storeys and a single-story extension, and contains a blocked doorway with a large lintel, and mullioned windows with some mullions removed. The former cottage has a single storey and an attic, and contains a door with a large chamfered lintel, and mullioned windows with some mullions removed. The barn is of cruck construction with a single cruck truss. It contains a barn door with a quoined surround, and a large lintel on rounded corbels, and there is a lean-to on the west.	II
Tong Lee; 53.60614°N 1.93989°W	—	1732	A stone house that has a stone slate roof with a coped gable to the west, and two storeys. On the front is a doorway with a deep lintel, quoins, and chamfered reveals, and in the east gable end is a doorway with an initialled and dated lintel, and quoins. The windows are mullioned, with some mullions removed, and there is a fire window with a semicircular false arch.	II
Ainsley Cottage, Marsden; 53.60364°N 1.94326°W	—	Early to mid 18th century	A stone house with quoins, and a stone slate roof with a chamfered and coped gable to the east with moulded kneelers. There are two storeys and the windows are mullioned, with some mullions removed and some lights blocked.	II
Far Owlers; 53.59802°N 1.96002°W	—	Early to mid 18th century	A farmhouse and barn, later altered, they are in stone, partly rendered, and have quoins. The house has a roof of slate, and the roof of the barn is in stone slate. The house has two storeys, its south front contains 19th-century windows, elsewhere most windows are mullioned, with some mullions removed, and there is a single-light window. The barn contains two doorways with quoins, and there is a lean-to extension with a catslide roof.	II
Intake Head Farmhouse; 53.60162°N 1.94189°W	—	Early to mid 18th century	The farmhouse is in stone, with quoins, and a stone slate roof with moulded kneelers. There are two storeys and a lean-to extension. The doorway has a stone surround, some windows have single lights, and most are mullioned, with some lights blocked and some mullions removed.	II
Lower Bradshaw; 53.62689°N 1.91619°W	—	Early to mid 18th century	A farmhouse in millstone grit on a plinth, with quoins, and a stone slate roof with carved kneelers. There are two storeys and a rear extension with a catslide roof. The two doorways have large quoins, tie-stones and lintels, and the windows are mullioned with some mullions removed.	II
Orchard Hey and Barn; 53.60666°N 1.94226°W	—	Early to mid 18th century	The house and barn are in stone, the house rendered, with stone gutter brackets, and a stone slate roof. The house has two storeys, a lean-to extension, and a single-light window, and the other windows are mullioned. In the barn are two large doorways with deep lintels, one also with quoins, a smaller doorway and windows.	II
Wards End; 53.61394°N 1.96093°W	—	Early to mid 18th century	A farmhouse in millstone grit on a plinth, with quoins, and a stone slate roof with moulded kneelers. There are two storeys, and a outshut extension at the eastern end, back to earth, with a catslide roof. The windows are mullioned, with some mullions removed.	II
Birks; 53.62776°N 1.91257°W	—	1736	A house and a barn in one range, they are in millstone grit on a plinth, with quoins, and a slate roof with a coped west gable. The house has two storeys, a doorway with a massive lintel and a modern porch, and the windows are mullioned, with some mullions removed. The barn has a doorway with a large uneven lintel inscribed with the date and initials, and there is a lean-to extension with a catslide roof.	II
Near Troughs; 53.60779°N 1.94886°W	—	1746	A former farmhouse, it is in stone, with quoins, and a roof partly in slate and partly in stone slate, with coped gables and moulded kneelers. There are two storeys and an extension to the north. The main doorway has a quoined and chamfered surround, and a deep inscribed and dated lintel, and the other doorways have stone surrounds. The windows are a mix; most are mullioned, some have single lights, there is a former large doorway converted into a window, and a modern bow window.	II
1 Bank Nook, Lingards Wood; 53.61551°N 1.91093°W	—	18th century	The house, which was altered in the 19th century, is in stone, with quoins, and a stone slate roof with moulded kneelers. It is in three and two storeys, and has a lean-to on the west side. There is a doorway with a chamfered surround, and a blocked doorway with a large lintel. The windows consist of a landing window with a semicircular head, in the lean-to is a semicircular window with a keystone and an ornamental sill, and the other windows are mullioned, with some blocked lights and some mullions removed.	II
7–8 Bank Nook, Lingards Wood; 53.61567°N 1.91089°W	—	Mid 18th century	A cottage, part of a terrace, it is in stone on a plinth, with quoins, and a stone slate roof. There are two storeys and the windows are mullioned.	II
Cowshed adjoining 6 Bents Lane, Lingards Wood; 53.61400°N 1.91724°W	—	Mid 18th century	The cowshed is in stone with quoins, and a stone slate roof. There are two storeys at the front and one at the rear. On the front is a doorway with a stone surround, and mullioned windows, and at the rear is a doorway with a quoined surround, and a blind window.	II
6–10 Marsden Lane, Marsden; 53.60366°N 1.92307°W	—	Mid 18th century	A row of three houses that have been altered, in rendered stone with a stone slate roof. There are two storeys, two doorways, a single-light window, and the other windows are mullioned.	II
Barn, North White Hull; 53.61157°N 1.96209°W	—	Mid 18th century	The barn, which was extended in 1855, is in stone, the earlier part with quoins, and it has a stone slate roof. In the earlier part is a doorway with a shaped lintel, and the later part contains a large central doorway with a dated lintel. To its right is a small doorway with a stone surround and tie-stones, and a re-set carved lintel.	II
Laund Farm; 53.63389°N 1.90223°W	—	18th century	A row of two cottages with barns between, later combined into a single dwelling. It is in stone with quoins, millstone grit surrounds to the windows and doorways, and a stone slate roof with coped gables, chamfered on the underside, and millstone grit kneelers. The main cottage on the left has two storeys, a doorway with a quoined surround and a deep lintel with a datestone and initials, and mullioned windows with some mullions removed. The former barns with outshuts are to the right, and further to the right is a single-storey rendered cottage.	II
Lower Top of Hill and barn 53.64583°N 1.92824°W	—	Mid 18th century	A terrace of houses and a barn in one range, they are in stone with quoins, and a stone slate roof with a coped south gable. There are three doorways with stone surrounds, and the windows are mullioned. The barn has a large central doorway with a stone surround, tie-stones, a segmental arch, and a keystone, and smaller doorways.	II
Nathans Cottages; 53.61001°N 1.90122°W	—	Mid 18th century	A row of three cottages, the third added later, they are in stone with quoins and a stone slate roof. There are two storeys, the doorways have stone surrounds, two with tie-stones, and the windows are mullioned, with one light blocked.	II
Row; 53.62227°N 1.90646°W	—	18th century	A farm cottage in a terrace, it is in stone, partly rendered, and has a stone slate roof and two storeys. There are two doorways, the windows are mullioned, with some mullions removed, and there are various altered openings.	II
Steep Farmhouse and Barn; 53.60395°N 1.91670°W	—	18th century	A farmhouse and barn, later extended, they are in stone, the house rendered, with quoins, and a stone slate roof with moulded kneelers. The house has two storeys and a basement, and a modern flat-roofed extension, and contains mullioned windows. In the barn is a central large doorway with a semicircular arch and quoins, and at the rear is a smaller doorway with a deep lintel and quoins.	II
Thieves Clough Bridge; 53.58744°N 1.96986°W		18th century	A packhorse bridge over Thieves Clough, it is in stone, and consists of a single semicircular arch.	II
3 and 4 Throstle Nest; 53.60022°N 1.93053°W	—	Mid 18th century	A pair of houses in a terrace, they are in stone, with quoins, stone gutter brackets, and a stone slate roof. There are two storeys, and a 19th-century extension to the west. On the front are two doorways with stone surrounds, and most of the windows are mullioned, with some lights blocked.	II
Water troughs 53.60441°N 1.91693°W	—	18th century (or earlier)	There are three water troughs in millstone grit on a plinth set in a recess in a dry stone wall. In front of the troughs is paving with setts. The water enters through a conduit in the left trough, and leaves by a lower conduit in the right trough.	II
Mile pole by Lower Royal George Public House; 53.64332°N 1.89601°W		1755	The mile pole consists of a vertical stone carved with pointing hands, the distances to Marsden, Scammonden, Daynhead and Huddersfield, the name of the surveyor, and the date.	II*
Reaps; 53.62544°N 1.93165°W	—	1756	A farmhouse and a later barn, they are in stone, with quoins, and a stone slate roof with a coped and moulded kneeler to the west of the barn. The house has two storeys and a rear outshut. There are two doorways with large lintels, the earlier one with an inscription, and the later one with a stone surround, and mullioned windows. The barn to the west has a large doorway with a segmental head, quoins and a keystone, a smaller door with quoins and a lintel, a mullioned window, and an extension to the east.	II
Upper House Farm; 53.62294°N 1.91330°W	—	1757	Two cottages and a barn in one range, they are in stone, with quoins and a stone slate roof. There are two storeys and a lean-to extension. In the cottages, the windows are mullioned, and there is a doorway with quoins and a datestone on a deep lintel. The barn contains a large central doorway with a semicircular-arched head, and a smaller doorway with a stone surround.	II
Badger Hey and Badger Hey Cottage; 53.60666°N 1.90425°W	—	1759	The house and cottage are in stone, partly rendered, with quoins, and a stone slate roof. There are two storeys, and a former barn to the west. Most of the windows are mullioned, and there are some modern casements. Both parts have doorways with quoined surrounds and deep lintels, the lintel of the house with initials and the date.	II
White Hull; 53.61122°N 1.96192°W	—	1761	A farmhouse in painted stone on a plinth, with quoins, and a stone slate roof with moulded kneelers. There are two storeys and lean-to extensions. The entrance is in a modern porch that has a stone surround, chamfered reveals, and a deep initialled and dated lintel, and the windows are mullioned.	II
The Green; 53.60176°N 1.92972°W	—	1763	A terrace of three stone houses, partly rendered, partly painted, with quoins, a stone slate roof, and two storeys. There are three doorways with stone surrounds, some casement windows, and most of the windows are mullioned.	II
12–13 Booth Bank, Lingards Wood; 53.61650°N 1.90851°W	—	Mid to late 18th century	A pair of stone cottages, partly rendered and painted, they have a stone slate roof, and two storeys. On the front are two doorways with large lintels, and the windows are mullioned.	II
14–15 Booth Bank, Lingards Wood; 53.61647°N 1.90858°W	—	Mid to late 18th century	A pair of stone cottages at the end of a row, with quoins, and a stone slate roof. There are two storeys, a later extension, three doorways, and the windows are mullioned, including a nine-light window in the upper floor.	II
Clough House Farm; 53.60637°N 1.90661°W	—	Mid to late 18th century	A house, and a former barn that has been rebuilt, they are in stone with quoins, and a stone slate roof with moulded kneelers. There are two storeys, a doorway with a stone surround, tie-stones, and a lintel with a motif. In both parts there are mullioned windows, with some mullions removed, and some lights blocked.	II
Cock Ring; 53.62109°N 1.91486°W	—	Mid to late 18th century	Two cottages and a former barn, they are in stone, partly rendered, with quoins, a slate roof, and two storeys. The doorways vary, there are some single-light windows, and most windows are mullioned, with some lights blocked.	II
Green Hills Farmhouse, cottage and barn 53.61094°N 1.92966°W	—	Mid to late 18th century	The farmhouse, cottage and barn are in one range, they are in stone on a plinth, the barn has quoins, the roof is in stone slate, coped with moulded kneelers on the barn. There are two storeys, and a lean-to extension. The house and cottage have a doorway with a stone surround, tie-stones, and a large lintel. Most of the windows are mullioned, and there is one casement window and one sash window. In the barn is a large central doorway with a keystone, a stone surround and tie-stones, and there are smaller doorways.	II
Cop Side; 53.62189°N 1.91305°W	—	1766	A farmhouse in stone, partly rendered, with quoins, and a stone slate roof with coped gables and moulded kneelers. There are two storeys, the rear is back to earth, and on both sides are single-storey extensions. The central doorway has large stone surrounds and tie-stones, and above it is a datestone. The windows on the front and sides are mullioned, with up to seven lights, and at the rear are single-light windows.	II
Whitelea Farmhouse; 53.60399°N 1.95194°W	—	1769	A farmhouse in stone with large quoins in millstone grit, a blue slate roof with a tile ridge, and two storeys. The doorway has stone jambs with large tie-stones, and a deep initialled and dated lintel in millstone grit. Most of the windows are mullioned, with some mullions removed and some lights blocked, and there are modern casement windows.	II
Stubbins Farmhouse and Barn; 53.60755°N 1.91498°W	—	1772	A farmhouse and barn in one range, with quoins and a stone slate roof. There are two storeys, the ground floor back to earth. The house has two doorways with stone surrounds, a modern porch, and mullioned windows. In the barn is a large central doorway with a semicircular head and a dated keystone, a small window above, a smaller doorway with a large inscribed and dated lintel, and a lean-to extension.	II
4 Cop Hill End; 53.62081°N 1.91018°W	—	Late 18th century	A stone house in a terrace with a stone slate roof and two storeys. The doorway has a stone surround, a tie-stone on one side, and a deep lintel, and the windows are mullioned.	II
5 Cop Hill End; 53.62074°N 1.91019°W	—	Late 18th century	A stone house in a terrace with a stone slate roof and two storeys. The doorway has a stone surround, a tie-stone on one side, and a deep lintel, some windows have single lights, and the others are mullioned.	II
6 Bank Nook, Lingards Wood; 53.61577°N 1.91074°W	—	Late 18th century	A stone house with quoins and a stone slate roof. There are two storeys, two doorways with large lintels, and the windows are mullioned.	II
1 Booth Bank, Lingards Wood; 53.61639°N 1.90765°W	—	Late 18th century	A stone house with quoins, and a stone slate roof with coped gables and cut kneelers. There are two storeys, and lean-to extension on both ends. The windows are mullioned with some mullions removed.	II
8 Booth Bank, Lingards Wood; 53.61681°N 1.90805°W	—	Late 18th century	A stone house in a terrace, with quoins and a stone slate roof. There are two storeys, two doorways, and the windows are mullioned.	II
10 Booth Bank, Lingards Wood; 53.61674°N 1.90817°W	—	Late 18th century	A house, part of a row, it is in stone, with a stone slate roof and two storeys. The doorway has a large lintel, and the windows are mullioned.	II
5 Shaw Fields and barn, Lingards Wood; 53.61886°N 1.90383°W	—	Late 18th century	A house and barn, part of a field terrace, they are in stone, with quoins in the barn, a stone slate roof, and two storeys, the ground floor back to earth. The house has mullioned windows with some mullions removed, and the barn contains a central segmental-arched doorway with a quoined surround, a small vent above, and small windows to the sides. There is also a smaller doorway with a stone surround and small windows.	II
6 Shaw Fields, Lingards Wood; 53.61889°N 1.90377°W	—	Late 18th century	A house at the end of a terrace, it is in painted stone with a stone slate roof. There are two storeys, it is back to earth, and there is a lean-to extension. The windows are mullioned, with some mullions removed.	II
3 Clough Lee, Marsden; 53.60174°N 1.93146°W	—	Late 18th century	A stone cottage, the front dating from the 19th century, it has a stone slate roof. There are two storeys and a lean-to extension. The doorway has a stone surround, there is one sash window, and the other windows are mullioned.	II
19 and 21 Gate Head, Marsden; 53.60428°N 1.91796°W	—	Late 18th century	A pair of mirror image houses in a terrace, they are in stone with rendered surrounds, and a stone slate roof. There are two storeys, and later extensions. The doorways have stone surrounds and deep lintels. The windows are mullioned, with some mullions removed.	II
23 Gate Head, Marsden; 53.60434°N 1.91788°W	—	Late 18th century	A stone house at the end of a terrace, it has quoins, stone gutter brackets, and a stone slate roof. There are two storeys and an attic, and to the right is a recessed two-storey wing. In the ground floor is a doorway with a quoined surround and a deep lintel, to the left is a four-light mullioned window, the upper floor contains a five-light mullioned window, and in the attic is a modern dormer. The openings in the wing are modern.	II
5 and 7 Town Gate, Marsden; 53.60093°N 1.92843°W	—	Late 18th century	Back-to-back weavers' houses at the end of a terrace, the building is in stone with quoins, and a roof of slate to the south and stone slate to the north. The doorway on the front is modern, the doorway in the gable end has a quoined surround and a deep lintel, and the doorway at the rear has a quoined surround. There are two later single-light windows, and the other windows are mullioned.	II
2 Chain, Meltham Road; 53.60619°N 1.90727°W	—	Late 18th century	A stone house in a terrace, with stone gutter brackets, a tile roof, two storeys and a basement. It contains a doorway with a stone surround, mullioned windows, and some later single-light windows.	II
3 Chain, Meltham Road; 53.60620°N 1.90720°W	—	Late 18th century	A stone house in a terrace, with stone gutter brackets, a tile roof, and two storeys. It contains a doorway with a stone surround, quoins, and tie-stones, and the windows are mullioned.	II
2 Tyas Lane and barns, Merry Dale; 53.62539°N 1.91242°W	—	Late 18th century	A cottage and two barns in one range, they are in millstone grit with quoins and a stone slate roof. The cottage has two storeys, a doorway with tie-stones and a large lintel, and the windows are mullioned. Each of the barns to the left has a large central segmental-headed doorway, a small window with a semicircular head above, and a smaller doorway with a stone surround.	II
1 Ainley Place, Wilberlee; 53.62984°N 1.90413°W	—	Late 18th century	Two cottages, later combined into one, in stone with dressings in millstone grit, quoins, and a stone slate roof. There are two storeys, the doorways have tie-stones and large lintels, there is one single-light window, and the others are mullioned.	II
9 Ainley Place, Wilberlee; 53.62937°N 1.90460°W	—	Late 18th century	A stone house at the end of a terrace, with quoins, and a stone slate roof with moulded kneelers. There are two storeys, the doorway has a surround, tie-stones and a large lintel in millstone grit, and the windows are mullioned.	II
15 Ainley Place, Wilberlee; 53.62918°N 1.90405°W	—	Late 18th century	Two cottages combined into one, the building is in stone with quoins, and a stone slate roof with a coped gable and moulded kneelers to the west. There are two storeys and a lean-to extension to the east. On the front are two doorways with stone surrounds, modern casement windows in the ground floor, and mullioned windows elsewhere.	II
9 Clough House, Wilberlee; 53.62601°N 1.90045°W	—	Late 18th century	A stone house with quoins and a stone slate roof. There are two storeys and single-storey extension at the rear, back to earth. The windows are mullioned, and the doorway in the east gable end has a quoined surround.	II
Ashton Binn and barn 53.60910°N 1.92347°W	—	Late 18th century	A house and barn in one range, they are in stone with quoins and a stone slate roof. There are two storeys, and a single-storey lean-to on the east. The house has a central doorway with a stone surround and tie-stones, and mullioned windows. In the barn is a central doorway with a lintel, a small doorway, and two round pitch holes.	II
Badger Hey Cottages; 53.60685°N 1.90307°W	—	Late 18th century	A terrace of five cottages, a barn at right angles, and extensions. They are in stone, with quoins, and a stone slate roof with a coped gable to the west on moulded kneelers. The doorways have stone surrounds, most also have tie-stones, and the windows are mullioned, with some blocked lights. The barn has a large central segmental-headed entry.	II
Bank Top Cottage; 53.59297°N 1.93211°W	—	Late 18th century	Two houses, later combined into one, it is in stone on a plinth, with quoins, a stone slate roof, and three storeys. On the front is a central doorway with a stone surround and a millstone grit lintel, and at the rear is a partly blocked doorway with a quoined surround. The windows are mullioned, with some replaced mullions.	II
Barn southeast of 1 and 2 Cop Side; 53.62186°N 1.91277°W	—	Late 18th century	A stone barn with quoins, a stone slate roof, and a later single-storey extension at each end. It contains a large doorway with a segmental arch, and smaller doorways with deep lintels.	II
Binn Edge Farmhouse and barn 53.58999°N 1.92142°W	—	Late 18th century	Two houses and a barn in a range in stone, on a plinth, with quoins, a stone slate roof. There are two storeys, and a single-storey extension to the south. The houses contain doorways and mullioned windows, with some mullions removed. In the barn is a large central with a lintel and quoins, and a small doorway with a millstone grit surround.	II
Bowser; 53.59208°N 1.93864°W	—	Late 18th century	Two houses and a barn in one range on a plinth, with quoins, a string course, and a stone slate roof. There are two storeys and a lean-to extension. The houses have doorways with stone surrounds, and mullioned windows with some blocked lights. The barn has a small entrance with stone surrounds, tie-stones, and an arched lintel, and in the gable end is a vent.	II
Cartgate Foot and barn 53.63189°N 1.91357°W	—	Late 18th century	A pair of cottage and a barn at right angles, they are in stone with a stone slate roof. The cottages have two storeys, doorways with stone surrounds, and mullioned windows. In the front and the rear of the barn is a large segmental doorway with quoins.	II
Barn, Clark Hill Farm; 53.59602°N 1.93491°W	—	Late 18th century	A stone barn built into a hillside, it has quoins and a stone slate roof. In the centre is a large doorway with stone surrounds and a deep lintel, and there are three vents. At the rear is a central doorway with a segmental-arched head, a stone surround, and tie-stones.	II
Cockley Cote and barn 53.63010°N 1.90937°W	—	Late 18th century	A farm terrace of three dwellings and a barn, they are in stone with quoins and a stone slate roof with a coped gable to the southwest. The entrances have stone surrounds, and most of the windows are mullioned, with some blocked lights.	II
Fair Hill Farmhouse and barn 53.60807°N 1.94997°W	—	Late 18th century	The barn, which was added later in the same range, and the farmhouse are in stone, and have quoins, and a stone slate roof with coped gables and moulded kneelers. There are two storeys and extensions, and the house has mullioned windows with some mullions removed. In the barn is a large semicircular-arched head and a smaller doorway, both with quoins.	II
Folly Farmhouse and barn 53.62254°N 1.91415°W	—	Late 18th century	Two houses and a barn in rendered stone, they have a stone slate roof with a coped gable to the east, a ball and stalk finial to the west, and moulded kneelers. In the houses are two eight-light mullioned windows in each floor. The barn contains a segmental-arched doorway converted into a smaller doorway and windows, mullioned windows and single-light windows.	II
Forest Farmhouse and Cottage; 53.58973°N 1.94006°W	—	Late 18th century	Originally two houses and a cottage, they are in stone with quoins, stone gutter brackets, a stone slate roof. There are two storeys, built back to earth, with a lean-to extension. The doorways have stone surrounds, some with tie-stones, and the windows are mullioned, with some mullions removed.	II
Green Lane Farmhouses and barn 53.61881°N 1.91355°W	—	Late 18th century	Two houses and a barn in one range, they are in stone with quoins, and a stone slate roof with a coped gable to the west. The houses contain a doorway with a stone surround, and the windows are mullioned. In the barn is a large central doorway with a deep lintel, and a smaller blocked doorway.	II
Greystones Farmhouse; 53.62567°N 1.92566°W	—	Late 18th century	The farmhouse, which has been altered, is in stone, with quoins, and a stone slate roof with a coped west gable and carved kneelers. There are two storeys, and the windows are mullioned, with some mullions removed, and some blocked lights.	II
Harrow Top Farmhouse, cottage and barn 53.62879°N 1.90438°W	—	Late 18th century	The farmhouse, cottage and barn have large plinth stones, quoins, and a stone slate roof with coped gables and moulded kneelers. The house and cottage have two storeys, a modern porch, a blocked doorway with a stone surround, and mullioned windows with some mullions removed. In the barn is a large central doorway with a quoined surround and millstone grit lintel on rounded corbels, small windows, and a smaller doorway with a stone surround and tie-stones.	II
Home Head Farm; 53.61317°N 1.90283°W	—	Late 18th century	A terrace of stone houses with quoins and a stone slate roof. There are two storeys and single-storey extensions. The doorways have stone surrounds, and there is a segmental-arched doorway to a former barn, converted into a window. The windows are mullioned, with some mullions removed.	II
Manor House Farm; 53.59855°N 1.93423°W	—	Late 18th century	A farm cottage in stone with quoins and a stone slate roof. There are two storeys and a lean-to extension. The doorway has a timber surround, and the windows are mullioned.	II
Manor House Farm Barn; 53.59866°N 1.93379°W	—	Late 18th century	The barn is in stone with quoins, a stone slate roof with moulded kneelers, and an outshut extension with a catslide roof. In the centre is a large doorway with quoins and a timber lintel, there are two single-light windows, and a large opening in the gable apex.	II
Mean Hey; 53.61925°N 1.92202°W	—	Late 18th century	Two cottages with a later barn at each end, they are in stone with quoins, a stone slate roof, and two storeys. Each cottage has a doorway with a stone surround, and mullioned windows. The barn at the east end has a doorway with a stone surround and a small window above, and the barn at the west end has a large doorway with a segmental arch, and a smaller doorway.	II
Moor Gate; 53.63097°N 1.90750°W	—	Late 18th century	The house, which was later extended, is in stone, with quoins, and a stone slate roof with coped gables and moulded kneelers in millstone grit. There are two storeys and an attic, and a lean-to extension to the right. On the front are three doorways with stone surrounds, one also with tie-stones and a millstone grit lintel. In the attic is a single-light window, and the other windows are mullioned.	II
New Hey Farmhouse and barn 53.59918°N 1.93910°W	—	Late 18th century	Originally three dwellings, the building is in stone, with quoins, stone gutter brackets, and a stone slate roof with coped gables, and moulded kneelers to the west. There are two storeys and a lean-to extension. The doorways have stone surrounds, one with tie-stones. Some of the windows have single lights, and most are mullioned, with some mullions removed, and some lights blocked.	II
Owlers End Farmhouse and barn 53.59259°N 1.92452°W	—	Late 18th century	A farmhouse and barn in one range, they are in stone, with quoins and a stone slate roof. The house has two storeys, a later porch, and mullioned windows. In the barn is a small doorway with a deep lintel, above which is a small vent.	II
Paddock; 53.61229°N 1.91542°W	—	Late 18th century	A farmhouse and barn in one range, they are in stone, with quoins, and a stone slate roof with moulded kneelers. The house has two storeys, the ground floor back to earth, a doorway with a stone surround and chamfered reveals, and mullioned windows. The barn has large plinth stones, an entrance with a large lintel on large corbels, and smaller doorways.	II
Peter's Farm and barn 53.59322°N 1.92449°W	—	Late 18th century	A row of three houses and a barn, they are in stone, with quoins, and a stone slate roof with a coped gable and kneeler on the barn. The barn contains a central doorway with a lintel and quoins, various windows, and a lean-to extension. In the houses are mullioned windows with some mullions removed and some lights blocked.	II
Row Farm; 53.62229°N 1.90710°W	—	Late 18th century	A stone farmhouse with quoins and a stone slate roof. There are two storeys, and a single-storey extension to the east. The entrance is through a modern porch, and the window are mullioned.	II
Row to north of 7 Bents Lane; 53.61356°N 1.91763°W	—	Late 18th century	A farm terrace in stone with quoins, and a stone slate roof with coped gables. There are two storeys and extensions. On the front are three doorways with stone surrounds, some of the windows have single lights, and most are mullioned.	II
Shaw Farmhouse and Barn; 53.59363°N 1.93593°W	—	Late 18th century	A house and barn in one range on a plinth, with quoins, stone gutter brackets, a stone slate roof, and two storeys. In the house is a doorway with a millstone grit lintel and quoins, and mullioned windows. The barn has a large central doorway with a segmental arch, a stone surround and a keystone, and a smaller doorway with a large lintel converted into a window.	II
Spring Hall Mount; 53.59198°N 1.92313°W	—	Late 18th century	The house, which was later extended, is in stone with quoins and a stone slate roof. There are two storeys and later lean-to extensions. The windows are mullioned, with some lights blocked and some mullions removed.	II
The Naze; 53.61562°N 1.91192°W	—	Late 18th century	One of a pair of houses, it is in stone with quoins. There are two storeys, and single-storey extensions back to earth. A modern porch obscures the doorway, and the windows are mullioned.	II
1 Throstle Nest; 53.60032°N 1.93037°W	—	Late 18th century	A house at the end of a terrace, it was extended in the 19th century, and is in stone, with quoins, stone gutter brackets, and a stone slate roof. The original part has four storeys, on the front are mullioned windows with three lights, and at the rear the windows have single lights. The extension to the right has two storeys and a basement, a doorway with a stone surround, and single light windows.	II
2 Throstle Nest; 53.60029°N 1.93043°W	—	Late 18th century	A house in a terrace, originally two houses, it is in stone with a stone slate roof. There are three storeys at the front and two at the rear. On the front are two doorways, one partly blocked, with stone surrounds and tie-stones, and the windows are mullioned.	II
Tyas House; 53.62526°N 1.91248°W	—	Late 18th century	A house and two cottages combined into one dwelling, it is in stone with quoins, and a stone slate roof with a coped gable with moulded kneelers to the west. There are two storeys, and an extension with a catslide roof to the north. In the centre is a doorway with a stone surround, and at the rear is a blocked doorway with a large lintel and a casement window inserted. The other windows are mullioned.	II
Upper Newgate and barn 53.62882°N 1.92617°W	—	Late 18th century	A cottage with a barn added later, they are in stone with quoins, a stone slate roof, and two storeys. In the cottage are mullioned windows with some mullions removed, and the barn contains a small doorway with a stone surround, and later higher openings.	II
Well Close; 53.59087°N 1.92200°W	—	Late 18th century	A house in millstone grit, with quoins and a stone slate roof. There are two storeys, the ground floor back to earth. The windows are mullioned, with some lights blocked.	II
Well Lane Head; 53.59254°N 1.92375°W	—	Late 18th century	A pair of stone houses, partly rendered, partly painted, they have quoins and a stone slate roof. There are two storeys and a single-story extension to the east. On front of the main block is a modern porch, and in the extension is a doorway with a atone surround. Most of the windows are mullioned, with some lights blocked, and there is a single-light window.	II
White House; 53.60660°N 1.90373°W	—	Late 18th century	The house, which has been partly rebuilt, is in stone. with quoins and a stone slate roof. There are two storeys and a single-storey extension. The doorway has a stone surround and tie-stones, most of the windows are mullioned, and there are single-light windows.	II
2 and 3 Moor Side Lane; 53.63195°N 1.89546°W	—	1777	A pair of stone houses at the end of a terrace, they have a stone slate roof and two storeys. The doorways have stone surrounds and tie-stones, and No. 3 has a deep lintel with a datestone above. The windows are mullioned, and some mullions have been removed.	II
4–5 Clough Lee, Marsden; 53.60175°N 1.93155°W	—	1782	A pair of mirror image houses, they are in stone with quoins and a stone slate roof. There are three storeys, and a single-storey lean-to extension with a catslide roof on each side. The doorways have quoined surrounds and deep lintels, most of the windows are mullioned, some have single lights, and above the doorway is an initialled and dated plaque.	II
Tiding Field Farmhouse and Barn; 53.63044°N 1.89761°W	—	1783	A house and a barn at right angles, the barn dating from the 19th century. They are in stone, with quoins, and a stone slate roof with coped gables and carved kneelers. There are two storeys and a lean-to extension with a catslide roof. The windows are mullioned, and some mullions have been removed. In the barn is a doorway with a segmental head and a smaller doorway, both with stone surrounds and tie-stones, and a small window above.	II
Netherwood Farmhouse and Barn; 53.61442°N 1.92443°W	—	1785	A farmhouse and barn in one range, they are in stone with a stone slate roof. The house has two storeys, mullioned windows, and a datestone over the doorway. In the barn is a large central doorway with a stone surround, tie-stones and a large lintel, a smaller doorway with a quoined surround and a large lintel, and it is on large plinth stones.	II
9 Gate Head, Marsden; 53.60406°N 1.91889°W	—	1789	A stone house with quoins, stone gutter brackets, and a stone slate roof. There are two storeys and a later extension. The two doorways have stone surrounds and tie-stones, the lintel of the door at the front being dated and initialled, and the windows are mullioned.	II
Canal milestone at SE 053 120; 53.60432°N 1.92194°W		1794–97	The milestone is set into a boundary wall on the east side of the Huddersfield Narrow Canal. It consists of a rectangular stone post with curved head, and has a round indented face inscribed "7 MILES".	II
Canal milestone at SE 062 131; 53.61415°N 1.90659°W		1794–97	The milestone is at the end of a boundary wall on the southeast side of the Huddersfield Narrow Canal. It consists of a rectangular stone post with curved head, and has a round indented face inscribed "6 MILES".	II
Canal Bridge No. 50 (Waring Bridge); 53.61512°N 1.90224°W		1794–98	The bridge carries a track over the Huddersfield Narrow Canal. It is in stone and consists of a single round arch. The bridge has a string course at the base of the parapets that have rounded copings. There are mounting blocks on the west parapet.	II
Canal Bridge No. 52 (Booths Bridge); 53.61208°N 1.91070°W		1794–98	The bridge carries a track over the Huddersfield Narrow Canal. It is in stone and consists of a single round arch. The bridge has a string course at the base of the parapets that have large copings with rounded tops.	II
Canal Bridge No. 55 (White Syke Bridge); 53.60498°N 1.92151°W		1794–98	An accommodation bridge over the Huddersfield Narrow Canal, it is in stone and consists of a single segmental arch. The parapets have copings, and the towpath is paved with setts.	II
Canal Bridge No. 59 at Lock No. 42; 53.60303°N 1.93038°W		1794–98	The bridge carries a road over the Huddersfield Narrow Canal. It is in stone and consists of a single segmental arch. The bridge has a string course at the base of the parapets that have copings. The parapets are corbelled out on each side.	II
Canal Bridge No. 62 and Access Duct; 53.60421°N 1.94074°W		1794–98	A footbridge over the Huddersfield Narrow Canal near the eastern entrance to Standedge Canal tunnel, which was rebuilt in the 19th century. It has a span of iron beams, with timber handrails, and stone abutment walls with rusticated dressings. The towpath goes round the outside, and on each side are stone setts. The access duct consists of a manhole about 20 feet (6.1 m) deep, with a timber cover and a large stone surround in form of an ellipse.	II
Pig Tail Bridge; 53.60839°N 1.91834°W		1794–98	The bridge carries a track over the Huddersfield Narrow Canal. It is in stone and consists of a single segmental arch. The bridge has a string course at the base of the parapet, and there are buttresses at the ends. Alongside the adjacent lock are mounting blocks.	II
Redbrook engine house 53.58850°N 1.96315°W		1798–1811	The engine house was used in the construction of Standedge Canal tunnel on the Huddersfield Narrow Canal and is sited nearly over its midpoint. It is in stone with a rectangular plan, without a roof, and has three storeys. There are various openings, and inside are two pits lined with brick and with a circular cross-section.	II
Entrance Portal, Standedge Canal tunnel 53.60379°N 1.94165°W		1798–1811	The portal at the entrance to the tunnel on the Huddersfield Narrow Canal has a semicircular arch leading to a stone vaulted tunnel. It has a string course and its parapet is coped.	II*
6 Cop Hill End and barn 53.62060°N 1.91021°W	—	Late 18th to early 19th century	A stone house and a barn at the end of a terrace, they are in stone, partly rendered, with quoins, and a stone slate roof with a coped gable and moulded kneelers to the south. The house has two storeys and a single-storey lean-to, and the windows are mullioned. In the barn is a large central doorway with a stone surround, tie-stones, and a large lintel, with smaller doorways to the sides and a small vent above.	II
9 Bents Lane, Lingards Wood; 53.61321°N 1.91787°W	—	Late 18th to early 19th century	A house and a barn in one range, they are in stone, and have a stone slate roof with a coped gable and moulded kneelers. There are two storeys, and in the house contains a single-light window and mullioned windows. In the barn is an arched doorway with a raised keystone, above which is a window with a false semicircular arch, two doorways with stone surrounds, and a mullioned window.	II
9 Booth Bank, Lingards Wood; 53.61675°N 1.90817°W	—	Late 18th to early 19th century	A rendered stone house in a terrace, with a stone slate roof and two storeys. There is one modern casement window, and the other windows are mullioned.	II
7 Shaw Fields, Lingards Wood; 53.61899°N 1.90419°W	—	Late 18th to early 19th century	A stone house in a group, with stone gutter brackets, and a stone slate roof with a coped gable to the west. There are two storeys, the ground floor back to earth. The doorway has a stone surround, there are some single-light windows, and most of the windows are mullioned.	II
33 Gate Head, Marsden; 53.60455°N 1.91704°W	—	Late 18th to early 19th century	A stone house at the end of a terrace, with quoins, stone gutter brackets, and a stone slate roof with coped gables on moulded kneelers. There are three storeys, and a lean-to extension at the rear. In the ground floor is an arched through passage on the left, and a doorway and a four-light window to the right. In each upper floor at the front and at the rear is an eight-light mullioned window.	II
31 Town Gate, Marsden; 53.60052°N 1.92947°W	—	Late 18th to early 19th century	A detached stone house with quoins, a stone slate roof, two storeys and a basement.. The doorway has a deep lintel, and the windows are mullioned, with some lights blocked, and some mullions removed.	II
5 Weirside, Marsden; 53.60079°N 1.92804°W	—	Late 18th to early 19th century	A detached stone house with quoins, stone gutter brackets, a stone slate roof with coped gables on moulded kneelers, and two storeys. The central doorway on the front has a stone surround and tie-stones, and at the rear is a doorway with plain jambs and a moulded cornice. At the rear is a central single-light window, and the other windows are mullioned.	II
Badger Gate; 53.60707°N 1.90069°W	—	Late 18th to early 19th century	A stone house with quoins, a stone slate roof, and two storeys. The doorway has a stone surround and tie-stones, and patera carved on the architrave, there is one single-light window, and the other windows are mullioned, with some mullions removed.	II
Cop and barn 53.62227°N 1.91064°W	—	Late 18th to early 19th century	A former farmhouse and a barn in one range, they are in stone with a stone slate roof and two storeys. The house has quoins, a doorway with a stone surround, and single-light and mullioned windows, some blocked. In the centre of the barn is a large segmental-arched doorway, with smaller doorways to the sides and a small window above.	II
Dark Wood Farmhouse; 53.61750°N 1.90284°W	—	Late 18th to early 19th century	The farmhouse is in stone, with quoins, a stone slate roof, and two storeys. The doorways have stone surrounds, some also have tie-stones, and the windows are mullioned, with some mullions removed, and some lights blocked.	II
Far Works Hill; 53.63664°N 1.90594°W	—	Late 18th to early 19th century	Two houses in stone with a stone slate roof and two storeys, the rear back to earth. There is a doorway with a stone surround, and the windows are mullioned.	II
Gate House; 53.59508°N 1.93505°W	—	Late 18th to early 19th century	A pair of mirror image cottages in stone with s stone slate roof. There are two storeys, a later extension at the rear, and a single-storey lean-to extension to the south. On the front are two doorways with stone surrounds, tie-stones, and deep lintels, both converted into windows, two five-light mullioned windows in the ground floor, and four three-light windows in the upper floor.	II
Hey Lays; 53.61776°N 1.91725°W	—	Late 18th to early 19th century	A stone house with millstone grit quoins, a sill band, and a stone slate roof with coped gables and moulded kneelers. There are two storeys, and flanking extensions. The windows are mullioned, with some lights blocked.	II
Ing Head; 53.59956°N 1.92368°W	—	Late 18th to early 19th century	A row of four houses in stone, with quoins, a stone slate roof, and two storeys. The two houses to the right have doorways with deep lintels. The windows include a single-light window, a sash window, and the other windows are mullioned, including a twelve-light window at the rear.	II
Inner Hey; 53.60090°N 1.92284°W	—	Late 18th to early 19th century	The house, which was later extended, is in stone with stone slate roofs. On the front is a block with two-storeys and two bays, a deeper single bay and a single-storey extension to the left. In the centre of the main block is a central doorway with a portico, and two four-light mullioned windows in each floor. The bay to the left contains a two-storey canted bay window, and in the extension is a doorway. At the rear is a former two-storey outbuilding joined to the house by later infill, and a small extension with a pyramidal roof.	II
Merry Dale Bridge; 53.62506°N 1.91322°W		Late 18th to early 19th century	The bridge carries a track over a stream in Scout Wood. It is in stone and consists of a single segmental arch. The bridge has a coped parapet containing a drainage hole.	II
Newgate House; 53.62583°N 1.92520°W	—	Late 18th to early 19th century	A farmhouse in a farm range, it is in stone with quoins, a stone slate roof, and two storeys. The windows are mullioned, with some lights blocked.	II
Pennine View; 53.61516°N 1.90327°W	—	Late 18th to early 19th century	A farmhouse, cottage and barn in one range, they are in stone with quoins. The farmhouse has a pantile roof with copings, the other parts have a stone slate roof, the barn with a coped gable. There are two storeys, and all parts have doorways with chamfered millstone grit surrounds. The barn also has a larger doorway with a semicircular head and quoins, and a lean-to extension. In the house and cottage are mullioned windows, with some mullions removed, and some lights blocked.	II
Pinfold, Wilberlee; 53.63038°N 1.90284°W	—	Late 18th to early 19th century	The pinfold has dry stone walls and a circular plan. It contains an entrance with a millstone grit lintel and quoins.	II
Scout Farmhouses and barn 53.59899°N 1.91755°W	—	Late 18th to early 19th century	A house and a barn in one range, they are n stone, partly rendered, with quoins, a stone slate roof, and two storeys. In the house is a casement window converted from a doorway, and the other windows are mullioned. The barn has lean-to extensions, and contains a doorway with a semicircular-arched head, a stone surround and tie-stones, mullioned windows, and a small window with a false arched head.	II
The Sun; 53.63773°N 1.90089°W	—	Late 18th to early 19th century	A stone house with quoins and a stone slate roof. There are two storeys, and a lean-to extension with a catslide roof on the northwest side. On the northeast side is a porch, and the windows are mullioned, with some lights blocked.	II
Well Lane; 53.59170°N 1.92524°W	—	Late 18th to early 19th century	A farm terrace in stone with quoins, and a stone slate roof with moulded kneelers and a finial. There are two storeys and lean-to extensions. The three doorways have stone surrounds, most of the windows are mullioned, and there are also single-light and modern windows.	II
Yew Tree; 53.64089°N 1.93067°W	—	Late 18th to early 19th century	The house, which has been altered, is in stone with quoins, and a tile roof with moulded kneelers and bargeboards. There are two storeys and three bays. The central doorway has a stone surround and a small cornice, and above it is a large window with a rounded head. The outer bays in each floor have four-light mullioned windows containing round-headed casements.	II
1 Chain and barn, Meltham Road; 53.60616°N 1.90740°W	—	1812	The cottage, once a public house, is at the end of a terrace, and the barn to the west is at right angles. Both are in stone with quoins. The cottage has a tile roof, two storeys and a basement, and a single-storey lean-to extension. It contains two doorways with stone surrounds and tie-stones, one partly blocked, a single-light window, and the other windows are mullioned. The barn has a stone slate roof and contains a large segmental-headed doorway with quoins and tie-stones, over which is an oculus.	II
7 Booth Bank, Lingards Wood; 53.61684°N 1.90801°W	—	Early 19th century	A stone house at the end of a terrace, with a stone slate roof. There are two storeys and a modern brick extension. The doorway has a large lintel, and the windows are mullioned.	II
6 Carrs Road, Marsden; 53.59869°N 1.92748°W	—	Early 19th century	A stone house with quoins and a stone slate roof. There are two storeys at the front and three at the rear, and a single-storey extension. The two doorways have stone surrounds, the doorway on the front also with tie-stones, and the windows are mullioned.	II
8–9 Clough Lee, Marsden; 53.60152°N 1.93161°W	—	Early 19th century	A pair of mirror image cottages in stone, with a stone slate roof and two storeys. The doorways have stone surrounds, and the windows are mullioned.	II
10–12 Clough Lee, Marsden; 53.60155°N 1.93165°W	—	Early 19th century	Three houses in a terrace, they are in stone, with a stone slate roof and two storeys. There are three doorways with stone surrounds, and the windows are mullioned.	II
17–18 Clough Lee, Marsden; 53.60161°N 1.93208°W	—	Early 19th century	A pair of stone houses in a terrace, with a stone slate roof. There are two storeys and a modern extension to the north. The doorways have stone surrounds, and the windows are mullioned.	II
20–21 Clough Lee, Marsden; 53.60171°N 1.93194°W	—	Early 19th century	A pair of mirror image cottages in a terrace, they are in stone with a stone slate roof and two storeys. The doorways are in the centre and have stone surrounds, and there are two three-light mullioned windows in each floor.	II
17 Gate Head, Marsden; 53.60422°N 1.91808°W	—	Early 19th century	A cottage in a terrace, it is in stone, with a stone slate roof and two storeys. The doorway to the right has a stone surround, and in each floor is a three-light mullioned window.	II
12–18 Station Road, Marsden; 53.60201°N 1.92956°W	—	Early 19th century	A row of four houses in stone, with quoins, stone gutter brackets, and a stone slate roof with cut kneelers. There are two storeys, four doorways with stone surrounds, two casement windows, and the other windows are mullioned, with one mullion removed.	II
House and barn north of 1 Slaithwaite Hall; 53.61360°N 1.91736°W	—	Early 19th century	The house and barn are in stone with a stone slate roof and two storeys. The house has a lean-to extension with a blue slate roof, and it contains a doorway with chamfered jambs and a lintel, and mullioned windows. In the barn are a large doorway with a wooden lintel, smaller doorways, and various windows, including a Venetian window.	II
Binn; 53.59399°N 1.92434°W	—	Early 19th century (or earlier)	A stone house at the end of a terrace, with a stone slate roof and two storeys. The central doorway has a stone surround, and the windows are mullioned, with some lights blocked.	II
Braehead; 53.64156°N 1.92948°W	—	Early 19th century	A stone house with a stone slate roof and two storeys. There are two doorways with stone surrounds, and the windows are mullioned.	II
Dirker; 53.60523°N 1.92833°W	—	Early 19th century	A pair of stone houses at the end of a terrace, with stone gutter brackets, a stone slate roof, and two storeys. The two doorways have stone surrounds, and the windows are mullioned, with some lights blocked.	II
Dirker Bank; 53.60590°N 1.92720°W	—	Early 19th century	The house is in rendered stone with a stone slate roof. There are two storeys, and a modern single-storey extension. In the ground floor are two doorways, some of the windows have single lights, and the others are mullioned, with some lights blocked.	II
Goat Hill Farmhouses and barns 53.62974°N 1.91921°W	—	Early 19th century	A pair of cottage flanked by barns, they are in stone, and have a stone slate roof with moulded kneelers to the southwest. There are two storeys, and a two-storey extension to the northwest, built back to earth. The cottages have doorways with stone surrounds, one with tie-stones, and mullioned windows. Both barns have large doorways with semicircular heads, stone surrounds and tie-stones, smaller doorways, and windows.	II
High Fall Farmhouse; 53.60562°N 1.93703°W	—	Early 19th century	A stone house that has a stone slate roof with coped gables and moulded kneelers. There are two storeys, and a single-storey extension with a catslide roof to the north. The entrance is through a modern porch and doorway, there are single-light windows, and most window are mullioned.	II
Lower Green Hill; 53.61040°N 1.92570°W	—	Early 19th century	A stone farmhouse with a stone slate roof and two storeys. There are two doorways with stone surrounds, one also with tie-stones, and the windows are mullioned.	II
Lower Scout Farmhouse and barn 53.59982°N 1.91702°W	—	Early 19th century	A terrace of three houses and a barn in stone, partly rendered, with quoins and a stone slate head. There are two storeys and rear extensions with catslide roofs. On the front are three doorways with stone surrounds and tie-stones, three four-light mullioned windows in the ground floor, and six three-light windows in the upper floor. The barn has an arched doorway with voussoirs and a keystones. In the extensions are single-light windows.	II
Ten tenter posts, Marsden; 53.60236°N 1.92480°W	—	Early 19th century	The ten tenter posts are in two rows, and are carved from solid stone.	II
Cottage east of The Hill; 53.60786°N 1.90718°W	—	Early 19th century	The cottage is in stone with quoins, a stone slate roof, and two storeys. The doorway has a stone surround, and the windows are mullioned, with some lights blocked. On the front are a cast iron plaque with a Gothic motif, a re-set datestone, and a loading door.	II
Tunnel End Cottages; 53.60397°N 1.94163°W		Early 19th century	A pair of tunnel keepers' cottages converted into a visitor centre, by the eastern entrance to Standedge Canal tunnel on the Huddersfield Narrow Canal. They are in stone with a grey slate roof, two storeys and four bays. Each cottage has a doorway and sash windows, and they are flanked by 20th-century outbuildings.	II
Waterways Depot; 53.60444°N 1.93989°W		Early 19th century	A warehouse for the Huddersfield Narrow Canal, later converted into a visitor centre, it is in stone with a slate roof. There are two storeys with an attic, five bays on the gabled entrance front, nine bays along the sides, and a later extension to the north. The entrance has a semicircular-arched head, and the windows have lintels. In the middle bays are loading doors, in the upper floor with a flat head, and in the attic with a semicircular head and a keystone.	II
White Syke; 53.60670°N 1.92116°W	—	Early 19th century	Two houses and a barn, they are in stone, partly rendered, with a stone slate roof and two storeys. The houses contain two doorways with a stone surround, most of the windows are mullioned, there is a single-light window, and later casements. In the barn are two doorways, one large, the other smaller, and two round pitch holes.	II
Hardenby Cottage, cottage and barn 53.64070°N 1.89922°W	—	1826	Two houses and a barn in one range, they are in stone with a stone slate roof and two storeys. In the houses there are two doorways, one with a stone surround, the other with a surround in timber, with a timber cornice on timber consoles. The windows are mullioned, with some blocked lights and some mullions removed. The barn has a large central doorway with a segmental head, a stone surround and tie-stones, and a small vent above.	II
Stone Fold Farmhouse and Barn; 53.60538°N 1.93559°W	—	1832	The barn is dated 1852, and the buildings are in stone, partly rendered, with a stone slate roof and moulded kneelers. There are two storeys, and extensions to the west. The windows are mullioned, with some mullions removed, and some lights blocked.	II
5 Bank Nook, Lingards Wood; 53.61579°N 1.91071°W	—	Early to mid 19th century	A cottage in a terrace, in stone, partly rendered, with a stone slate roof, two storeys, and mullioned windows. In the ground floor is a five-light window, and the upper floor contains a window with six lights.	II
1–4 Bents Lane, Lingards Wood; 53.61388°N 1.91754°W	—	Early to mid 19th century	A terrace of four stone cottages that have a stone slate roof with a coped gable and moulded kneelers to the southwest. There are two storeys, and the doorways have stone surrounds, one with tie-stones and an elliptical-arched head. Most of the windows are mullioned, some mullions have been removed, some windows have single lights, and there is an inserted garage door.	II
5 Bents Lane, Lingards Wood; 53.61396°N 1.91747°W	—	Early to mid 19th century	A stone house, part of a group, with a stone slate roof, two storeys and a single-storey extension. There are two doorways with stone surrounds, one blocked, one single-light window, and the other windows are mullioned, with some lights blocked.	II
1 Crow Trees Road and barn, Lingards Wood; 53.61392°N 1.91157°W	—	Early to mid 19th century	A house and a barn in one range, they are in stone, and have a stone slate roof with a ball and stalk finial on the gable of the barn. The house has two storeys, and contains a doorway with a stone surround and mullioned windows, with four lights in the ground floor and six in the upper floor. The barn to the left is lower, and has a central doorway with a quoined surround and a deep lintel, above it is a small vent with a semicircular head, and to the left is a smaller doorway.	II
23 and 25 Station Road and dairy, Marsden; 53.60252°N 1.92947°W	—	Early to mid 19th century	The buildings are in stone and have a stone slate roof with a coped west gable. There are two storeys, and extensions to the east. The doorway have stone surrounds, the windows are mullioned, with some mullions removed and some lights blocked, and there is a dated ornamental tablet with the carving of a cow.	II
3 Town Gate, Marsden; 53.60102°N 1.92832°W	—	Early to mid 19th century	A stone house with quoins, moulded stone gutter brackets, a stone slate roof, and two storeys. The doorways have stone surrounds, some with tie-stones, one of the windows is mullioned with five lights, and the others have single lights.	II
7 Ainley Place, Wilberlee; 53.62949°N 1.90445°W	—	Early to mid 19th century	A house in a terrace, it is in stone with a stone slate roof. There are two storeys, the ground floor back to earth. The doorways have stone surrounds and tie-stones, and the windows are mullioned.	II
3 Clough House, Wilberlee; 53.62623°N 1.89987°W	—	Early to mid 19th century	A stone house in a terrace, partly rendered, that has a stone slate roof with moulded kneelers, and two storeys. The doorway has a stone surround, there are two single-light windows, and the other windows are mullioned.	II
4 and 5 Clough House, Wilberlee; 53.62619°N 1.90004°W	—	Early to mid 19th century	A pair of stone houses in a terrace, with a stone slate roof and two storeys. Each house has a doorway with a stone surround and tie-stones, and mullioned windows, with a six-light window in the ground floor and two three-light windows in the upper floor.	II
Bank Bottom; 53.60947°N 1.90793°W	—	Early to mid 19th century	A weaver's cottage in stone with stone gutter brackets, and a stone slate roof with coped gables. There are two storeys and a basement, and a single-storey extension with a slate roof. The doorways have stone surrounds, and the windows are mullioned.	II
Bridge over overflow 53.59386°N 1.93002°W	—	Early to mid 19th century	The bridge carries a road over the overflow from Butterley Reservoir. It is in stone, and consists of a single segmental arch with rusticated dressings, a string course, and a parapet with flagstone copings.	II
Cartgate Foot; 53.63206°N 1.91344°W	—	Early to mid 19th century	A stone house with a stone slate roof and two storeys. The doorway has a stone surround, and the windows are mullioned, with a four-light window on the ground floor, and two three-light windows in the upper floor.	II
Cartgate Road; 53.63172°N 1.91519°W	—	Early to mid 19th century	A house in stone with a stone slate roof. There are two storeys, a later ground floor extension, and the windows are mullioned.	II
Dark Wood Cottage; 53.61760°N 1.90284°W	—	Early to mid 19th century	A farm cottage in stone, with a stone slate roof, and two storeys, built back-to-earth. There are two doorways with stone surrounds and tie-stones, and blocked doorway at the rear. Two of the windows have single lights, and the others are mullioned.	II
Hardenby Farm House and Barn; 53.64059°N 1.89940°W	—	Early to mid 19th century	The farmhouse and barn, at the end of a terrace, are in rendered stone, and have a stone slate roof with coped gables, and two storeys. The house has a doorway with a timber surround, and a timber cornice on timber consoles, and the windows are mullioned with some mullions removed. In the barn is a central doorway with a semicircular-arched head and a stone surround, and above it is a small vent.	II
House at junction of Manchester Road and Oliver Lane; 53.60011°N 1.92781°W	—	Early to mid 19th century	A stone house with a stone slate roof, it has fronts of two and three storeys. The doorway has a stone surround, and the windows are a mix of single lights and mullioned windows.	II
Ingfield House; 53.60033°N 1.92563°W	—	Early to mid 19th century	The house, at one time a public house, is in stone, rendered at the front, with a sill band, a moulded eaves cornice and blocking course, and coped gables. There are two storeys and an attic, and a front of five bays. The doorway on the front has an entablature and a pediment, and on the left return is a doorway with a fanlight and an entablature. Most of the windows are sashes, and in the attic in the right return is a Venetian window.	II
Intake Head Cottages; 53.60175°N 1.94155°W	—	Early to mid 19th century	The two cottages are in stone with a stone slate roof and two storeys. The windows are mullioned, with some mullions removed, some lights blocked, and one window altered and extended. In the north gable end is a former loading door.	II
Ivy Cottage; 53.60489°N 1.92932°W	—	Early to mid 19th century	A house in a group, it is in stone, and has a stone slate roof with a coped gable and moulded kneelers to the northeast. There are two storeys and a single-storey rendered brick extension. The doorway has a stone surround, and the window are mullioned.	II
Moorgate Restaurant; 53.64172°N 1.92928°W	—	Early to mid 19th century	The building is in stone, partly rendered, with a stone slate roof, and two storeys, the ground floor built back to earth. On the front are three doorways with stone surrounds, and a modern porch. Most of the windows are mullioned, there is one casement window and some single-light windows.	II
Quebec; 53.64145°N 1.89158°W	—	Early to mid 19th century	A stone house with stone gutter brackets, and a stone slate roof with coped gables. There are two storeys, two doorways with stone surrounds, and the windows are mullioned.	II
The Hey and barn 53.60698°N 1.94240°W	—	Early to mid 19th century	A farmhouse and adjoining barn, they are in stone. with stone gutter brackets, a stone slate roof with coped gables, and two storeys. In the house are two doorways with stone surrounds, most of the windows are mullioned with some mullions removed, and there are also single-light windows, and 20th-century bay windows. The barn has opposing central large doorways with segmental heads, stone surrounds and tie-stones, smaller doorways with stone surrounds, one also with a re-set dated and initialled lintel, and later extensions.	II
West End Farmhouses and barn 53.63355°N 1.91401°W	—	Early to mid 19th century	Two cottages and a barn in stone, with quoins, and a stone slate roof with coped gables. There are two storeys and an extension with a catslide roof. One of the doorways in the cottages is blocked, the other has a stone surround, and the windows are mullioned, with some mullions removed. In the barn is a large central segmental-ached doorway.	II
Gate piers and walls, Pole Moor Baptist Chapel; 53.63919°N 1.89994°W	—	c. 1838	The burial ground is enclosed by a dry stone wall. The entrance is flanked by stone gate piers capped with pediments, and between them is a wrought iron overthrow.	II
Bridge and Weir, Hey Green; 53.60648°N 1.95454°W	—	1839	The bridge carries a road over the River Colne. It is in stone, and consists of a single arch with vermiculated dressings. It has a parapet of large blocks ending in large gate posts. On the parapet is an inscribed iron plaque. The weir is in stone, it is curved, and has a drop of about 10 feet (3.0 m).	II
The Hill; 53.60781°N 1.90739°W	—	1842	A rebuilt house, in stone, with stone gutter brackets and a stone slate roof. There are two storeys at the front and three at the rear. On the front is a doorway with a stone surround, the windows are mullioned, and on the rear is an inscribed triangular plaque.	II
Shred Mission Church; 53.62809°N 1.91298°W		1845	The chapel, later converted for other uses, is in stone with a stone slate roof, a cross finial on the east gable, and bargeboards with finials. There are two storeys, and a symmetrical south front with two gabled porches and Tudor arched doorways. The ground floor contains two two-light mullioned windows, in the upper floor are three similar windows and two single-light windows. Between the floor is a continuous inscribed sill band, and on the west gable is an open bellcote with a weathercock. In the east gable end are two three-light lancet windows with decorative glazing bars.	II
Railway tunnel portals 53.60343°N 1.94225°W		1845–49	The three portals were built at the entrances to the Standedge Railway Tunnels, the first two for the Manchester and Huddersfield Railway, and the other in 1890–94 for the London and North Western Railway. The arches are in brick and the walls in gritstone. Each portal has a horseshoe arch and flanking buttresses, Above the older arches is a moulded string course and a blocking course acting as a cornice. The later tunnel is larger, and above it is a dentilled cornice and a scalloped parapet that rises over a datestone.	II
Bridge over outlet to Sparth Reservoir; 53.60954°N 1.91651°W	—	1848	The bridge is in stone and consists of a single segmental arch. It has a dated keystone, and is paved with stone flags.	II
Waterfall Cottages; 53.60529°N 1.94097°W	—	1848	A terrace of six cottages in stone, with stone gutter brackets, and a stone slate roof with coped gables on moulded kneelers. There are two storeys, the middle bay projects under a gable, and it contains two doorways under a hood mould. All the doorways have stone surrounds, tie-stones, and shallow false arches, and the windows are mullioned.	II
Carr House and Barn; 53.63557°N 1.91740°W	—	1850	A farmhouse and barn in one range, in stone, with stone gutter brackets, and a stone slate roof. The house has two storeys and a lean-to extension. In the centre is a doorway with a stone surround, and the windows are mullioned. The barn has a large central doorway with a semicircular head, stone surrounds, tie-stones, and a keystone. Above it is a datestone, and over that is a window with a semicircular false arch.	II
19 Clough Lee, Marsden; 53.60165°N 1.93202°W	—	Mid 19th century	A stone house in a terrace with quoins, a stone slate roof, and two storeys. The doorway has a stone surround, there is one sash window, and the other windows are mullioned.	II
Bank Top; 53.60831°N 1.95854°W	—	Mid 19th century	A farmhouse and farm buildings in stone, forming a courtyard. The barn has a roof of stone slate, the other buildings have slate roofs, and the coped gables have moulded kneelers. The house has two storeys and a attic, a doorway with a fanlight, round-headed windows with voussoirs, and in the attic is a Venetian window. The barn has a central doorway with a quoined surround and a semicircular-arched head, the other openings also have semicircular heads, and there are ventilation slits.	II
Blake Clough and Barn; 53.62037°N 1.92609°W	—	Mid 19th century	A farmhouse and barn in one range, in stone with quoins, stone gutter brackets, and a stone slate roof with coped gables and moulded kneelers to the west. The house has two storeys, a doorway with a chamfered surround, a fanlight and a Tudor arched head. There is a single-light window, and the other windows are mullioned, with a hood mould over the ground floor window. In the barn is a large central semicircular-arched doorway with stone surrounds and tie-stones, and above it is a Venetian window. Elsewhere are smaller doorways, vents, and a mullioned window.	II
House northeast of Forest Farm; 53.58989°N 1.93965°W	—	Mid 19th century	A weaver's house in stone, partly rendered, it has a stone slate roof with coped gables. The central doorway has a stone surround and tie-stones, most of the windows are mullioned, there are two single-light windows, and a former loading door converted into a window.	II
Near Field; 53.61209°N 1.90249°W	—	Mid 19th century	A stone house with a sill band, stone gutter brackets, and a stone slate roof with a coped gable to the west. There are three storeys, the ground floor back to earth, three bays on the front, and a single-storey extension to the east. The doorways have stone surrounds, and the windows are mullioned.	II
New Bridge, Marsden; 53.60032°N 1.92957°W	—	Mid 19th century	The bridge carries Manchester Road (A62 road) over Wessenden Brook, and is in stone, with a single arched span. It has a parapet with a string course at its base and rounded copings, and at the north end are two piers.	II
Old New Inn; 53.59864°N 1.92760°W	—	Mid 19th century	The public house is in stone with quoins, and a stone slate roof with coped gables and carved kneelers. There are two storeys, a symmetrical front of five bays, and a lean-to extension on the left. In the centre is a doorway with square pilasters, a semicircular fanlight, and a pediment, and the extension contains a doorway with a stone surround and tie-stones. The windows are sashes, and at the rear is a round-headed stair window.	II
Potters; 53.63530°N 1.90105°W	—	Mid 19th century	A stone house that has a stone slate roof with a coped gable to the west. There are two storeys, the doorway has a stone surround, and the windows are mullioned.	II
The New Inn; 53.60018°N 1.92624°W		Mid 19th century	The public house is in stone, with a sill band, stone gutter brackets, and a stone slate roof with coped gables. The main block has two storeys and a symmetrical front of five bays, and to the right is a recessed bay with three storeys. The central doorway has pilasters, a frieze, and a pediment, and the windows are sashes. In the west gable apex is a Venetian window. To the left of the main bock is a former doorway, partly blocked, with a semicircular head and a keystone, and above it is a cornice and a blocking course.	II
Chimney, Clough Lee Mills; 53.60100°N 1.93388°W		1853	The mill chimney, which stands alone, is in stone, and consists of an octagonal chimney on a square base. On the chimney is an inscribed plaque.	II
Barn, Berry Greave; 53.60762°N 1.94389°W	—	1855	The barn is at the end of a terrace, it is in stone, and has a stone slate roof with coped gables. There are two storeys, and in the middle of the north front is a doorway with a semicircular arched head, a dated and initialled rusticated keystone, voussoirs, and quoins. The other openings in the front include small doorways with stone surrounds and tie-stones, a four-light mullioned window, and single-light windows, and there are similar openings in the south front.	II
Pole Moor Baptist Church, Sunday School and house 53.63915°N 1.90030°W		1859	The buildings are in stone with stone slate roofs. The former church has rusticated quoins, and coped gables with moulded kneelers on paired carved consoles. There are two storeys and a basement, a front of three bays, and five bays along the sides. The front has a pedimented gable, and in the centre steps lead up to doorway with a round head and a fanlight. Its surround has round engaged columns with Ionic capitals, an architrave, and a cornice. The doorway is flanked by windows, each with a moulded surround and a cornice, and the tripartite window above it has a moulded surround, an architrave, and a pediment. In the tympanum of the pediment is an inscribed plaque. To the west are a Sunday school with single-light windows, and dwellings with mullioned windows.	II
Mechanics Institute; 53.60097°N 1.92672°W		1859–61	A clock tower was added to the building in about 1900. The building is in stone, with a band, a frieze, a moulded bracketed eaves cornice, and a hipped slate roof. There are two storeys, a front of three bays on Peel Street, and five bays along Brougham Road. On Peel Street is a central portico with paired Corinthian columns and pilasters, a full entablature, and a balcony with iron rails. The windows are round-arched, in the ground floor with voussoirs and an impost band, and in the upper floor with impost capitals, scrolled spandrels, a console keystone, and a bracketed cornice. On the corner is a square timber clock tower with a pediment on each face and a pyramidal roof with lucarnes and decorative metal railings at the top.	II
Wood Bottom Mill; 53.60440°N 1.92040°W		1862	The former textile mill, which has been altered and used for other purposes, is in gritstone with mainly stone slate roofs. It consists of a fulling mill, parallel to the north is a warehouse, and to the north are two single-storey sections. Separate and to the east are two former cottages. The former fulling mill has three-storeys and nine bays, and at the west end is an archway for the former water wheel. The warehouse has two storeys and four bays.	II
St Bartholomew's Church, Scammonden; 53.64051°N 1.93142°W		1863–65	The church is in Gothic Revival style, and is built in stone with a roof of grey and purple slate. It consists of a nave, a south porch, north and south transepts, a chancel, and a south tower. The tower has four tiers, a five-sided stair tower, an embattled parapet with gargoyles, and a pyramidal spire. On the south side of the church is a sundial, and at the west end is a rose window.	II
Gate piers, St Bartholomew's Church, Scammonden; 53.64044°N 1.93120°W	—	Mid to late 19th century	The gate piers at the entrance to the churchyard are in stone with a square plan. They have carved motifs, and a pitched cap with a roll top.	II
6 miles post, Lingards Wood; 53.61016°N 1.90730°W		Late 19th century	The milepost is on the southeast side of Manchester Road (A62 road), Lingards Wood. It consists of a cast iron plate on a stone post, and has a triangular plan and a rounded top. On the top is "WAKEFIELD & AUSTERLANDS ROAD" and "MARSDEN", and on the sides are the distances to Huddersfield and Oldham. The makers' names are in small letters.	II
6 miles post, Worts Hill; 53.63783°N 1.91312°W		Late 19th century	The mile post is on the southeast side of New Hey Road (A640 road). It consists of a cast iron plate on a stone post, and has a triangular plan and a rounded top. On the top is "HUDDERSFIELD & NEW HEY ROAD" and "SCAMMONDEN", and on the sides are the distances to Huddersfield, Junction and Rochdale. The makers' names are in small letters.	II
7 miles post, Marsden; 53.60053°N 1.92453°W		Late 19th century	The milepost is on the southeast side of Manchester Road (A62 road), Marsden. It consists of a cast iron plate on a stone post, and has a triangular plan and a rounded top. On the top is "WAKEFIELD & AUSTERLANDS ROAD" and "MARSDEN", and on the sides are the distances to Huddersfield and Oldham. The makers' names are in small letters.	II
7 miles post, Goat Hill; 53.63130°N 1.93206°W	—	Late 19th century	The mile post is on the southeast side of New Hey Road (A640 road). It consists of a cast iron plate on a stone post, and has a triangular plan and a rounded top. On the top is "HUDDERSFIELD & NEW HEY ROAD" and "SLAITHWAITE", and on the sides are the distances to Huddersfield, Junction and Rochdale. The makers' names are in small letters.	II
8 miles post, Cupwith Hill; 53.62386°N 1.95668°W		Late 19th century	The mile post is on the southeast side of New Hey Road (A640 road). It consists of a cast iron plate on a stone post, and has a triangular plan and a rounded top. On the top is "HUDDERSFIELD & NEW HEY ROAD" and "SCAMMONDEN", and on the sides are the distances to Huddersfield, Junction and Rochdale. The makers' names are in small letters.	II
10 miles post 53.61457°N 1.99707°W		Late 19th century	The mile post is on the east side of New Hey Road (A640 road). It consists of a cast iron plate on a stone post, and has a triangular plan and a rounded top. On the top is "HUDDERSFIELD & NEW HEY ROAD" and "MARSDEN", and on the sides are the distances to Huddersfield, Junction and Rochdale. The makers' names are in small letters.	II
Overflow, Butterley Reservoir; 53.59246°N 1.92866°W		1891–1906	The overflow to Butterley Reservoir is in stone with weirs and cascades. The side walls have stepped copings, and square piers with moulded pyramidal copings. It is about 200 yards (180 m) long and descends over 100 feet (30 m).	II
Overflow Portal, Butterley Reservoir; 53.59273°N 1.92943°W	—	1891–1906	The portal of the overflow is in stone, and has a semicircular-arched head and moulded reveals. Its surround has a moulded cornice and a blocking course. On each side the wings curve forward forming walls, and end in square posts with moulded pyramidal copings. Along the tops of the wings are bevelled stone steps, and in front of the portal are iron sluices.	II
St Bartholomew's Church, Marsden; 53.60129°N 1.93041°W		1894–95	The church was designed by C. Hodgson Fowler in Perpendicular style, and additions were made later, including the tower in 1911. The church is built in stone with a slate roof, and consists of a nave with a clerestory, north and south aisles, north and south porches, a chancel with a north vestry and a south chapel, and a west tower. The tower has four stages, angle buttresses, clock faces on all sides, and an embattled parapet with crocketted pinnacles. The east window has five lights.	II
Aqueduct and weir 53.60365°N 1.94185°W	—	c. 1900	The aqueduct carries the overflow from the Tunnel End Reservoir over a railway and into the Huddersfield Narrow Canal, and has riveted steel panels. The weirs are rounded, and have stone walls, buttresses, and parapets with large copings.	II
Boer War Memorial; 53.60100°N 1.92990°W	—	1904	The memorial is to the memory of three men who died in the Boer War, it is in the churchyard of St Bartholomew's Church, and is in stone. There is a base of three sections; the lowest consisting of three steps, the next section has items carved in low relief, and the top section is inscribed with the names and details of the men lost. This is surmounted by an octagonal broach spire with an ornamental finial.	II
Lych gate, St Bartholomew's Church, Marsden; 53.60142°N 1.92953°W		Early 20th century	The lych gate is in stone with a hipped slate roof. It has eight large squared timber supports with carved braces and brackets, and timber framing.	II
Monument to Samuel Laycock; 53.59995°N 1.92414°W		1911	The memorial to the poet Samuel Laycock is in Marsden Park. It is in stone and thought to be partly Celtic in origin. The memorial consists of an upright stone with an inscribed plaque on a base, the front of which is carved in low relief with oak leaves, acorns and flowers.	II
Marsden War Memorial; 53.60006°N 1.92405°W		1922	The war memorial is in Marsden Park, and is in Portland stone. It stands on a circular platform, and consists of a tall square shaft on a pedestal, a moulded base, and a stepped plinth. On the top is a moulded cornice and a sarcophagus with an eternal flame, and by the side are wings with carved recumbent lions. On the north and south faces of the pedestal are swagged cartouches, and on the wings are granite plaques inscribed with the names of those lost in the two World Wars.	II
