= Listed buildings in Colne Valley (central area) =

Colne Valley is an unparished area in the metropolitan borough of Kirklees, West Yorkshire, England. Colne Valley ward contains over 480 listed buildings that are recorded in the National Heritage List for England. Of these, twelve are listed at Grade II*, the middle of the three grades, and the others are at Grade II, the lowest grade.

This list contains the listed buildings in the central part of the ward, in which the largest settlement is the village of Slaithwaite, and it includes the smaller settlements and districts of Clough Head, Hill Top, Holt Head, and Lower Holme. Apart from the settlements, this part of the ward is almost completely rural. A high proportion of the listed buildings are farmhouses and farm buildings, almost all constructed in stone with roofs of stone slate, and containing mullioned windows. During the 19th century, the ward was involved in the textile industry, and the listed buildings associated with this are former weavers' houses and mills. The River Colne and the Huddersfield Narrow Canal pass through this part of the ward, and the listed buildings associated with the canal are two bridges and a milestone. The other listed buildings include houses and cottages and associated structures, churches and chapels and associated structures, a road bridge, public houses, a lockup, former schools, two railway viaducts, and a mile post.

The listed buildings in the other parts of the ward can be found at Listed buildings in Colne Valley (eastern area) and Listed buildings in Colne Valley (western area)

== Key ==
Grade	Criteria
II*	Particularly important buildings of more than special interest
II	Buildings of national importance and special interest

== Buildings ==
Name and location	Photograph	Date	Notes	Grade
Manor House; 53.62243°N 1.88388°W		Late 16th century	The house, which has been extended, is in stone, and has a stone slate roof with chamfered gable copings and a finial. There are two storeys, a cross-wing on the right with a gable at the front and a hipped roof at the rear, and a continuous outshut at the rear. The doorways have arched heads, one with a Tudor arch, and the windows are mullioned and transomed, or mullioned.	II*
Linthwaite Hall Barn; 53.62139°N 1.87271°W	—	c. 1600	The barn has a cruck construction with later asbestos cladding and roofing. There were originally five crucks and five bays, and one full cruck and two part crucks remain.	II
Sundial, Manor House; 53.62233°N 1.88405°W	—	c. 1600	The sundial in the garden to the south of the house consists of a millstone grit pedestal 5 feet (1.5 m) high. The stone had been found locally, and converted into a sundial by the addition of a brass dial and gnomon.	II
Linthwaite Hall; 53.62138°N 1.87327°W		Early 17th century	Originally a manor house, later divided, it is in stone on a plinth, with quoins and a stone slate roof with chamfered gable copings and finials. There are two storeys and an attic, and it consists of a hall range and a wide gabled cross-wing on the right. In the hall range is a two-storey gabled porch with an arched entrance and chamfered surrounds. The windows are mullioned and transomed or mullioned, some with hood moulds.	II*
Wood End Farm; 53.62970°N 1.87811°W	—	1626	The farmhouse is in stone, partly rendered, with quoins, and a stone slate roof with coped gables, millstone grit kneelers, and finials. There are two storeys, and the main doorway has a massive slightly-arched and dated lintel. Most of the windows are mullioned and have hood moulds, and there are some single-light windows.	II*
Barn adjoining 14 Holme Lane, Lower Holme; 53.62226°N 1.89653°W	—	17th century	A stone barn with millstone grit quoins, a stone roof, and one storey. In the east front is a doorway with an oak lintel, a barn doorway with large quoins and a square head, and three small windows.	II
Broadfield Farm; 53.61473°N 1.88193°W	—	17th century	The farmhouse, which was altered in the 19th century, is in stone with quoins, and a stone slate roof with moulded kneelers. There are two storeys, and a single-storey extension. On the front is a modern porch, and the windows are mullioned.	II
Barn, Broadfield Farm; 53.61482°N 1.88216°W	—	17th century	The barn is in stone with large quoins and a stone slate roof. There are two storeys at the front, at the rear is one storey, built back to earth, and at the north is a continuous outshut that has a central doorway with large quoins. On the front is a large doorway with large quoins, a chamfered surround and a large Tudor arched lintel, and in the east gable is a dovecote.	II
Wood End Farm; 53.62975°N 1.87800°W	—	17th century	A cottage, part of a group, it is in stone, with partly rendered quoins, a stone slate roof, and two storeys. The doorway has a stone surround, there is a single-light window, and the other windows are mullioned, one ground floor window with a hood mould.	II
16 Hill Top Road, Slaithwaite; 53.62505°N 1.88145°W	—	1685	The house of a yeoman farmer that has been altered and divided, it is in stone, incorporating some earlier timberwork, and has quoins and a stone slate roof. There are two storeys, and the left bay projects and is taller. Most of the windows are chamfered and mullioned, and there is a window with an ogee head. The main doorway has a chamfered surround, it is arched, and has an initialled and dated lintel.	II
Barn, 11 Hill Top; 53.61433°N 1.89327°W	—	17th or 18th century	The barn is in stone with massive quoins, a stone slate roof, and an extension with a catslide roof. The doorways have massive millstone grit quoins and lintels, the largest doorway with the lintel on rounded corbels.	II
11 and 12 Hill Top; 53.61427°N 1.89309°W	—	1733	A pair of houses in one range with No. 12 dating from the 19th century. They are in stone with quoins, and a stone slate roof with a coped gable to No. 11. No. 11 has a doorway with a Tudor arched lintel and a hood mould above, and the windows are mullioned with some mullions removed. No. 12 Has some mullioned windows, and the other windows are modern casements.	II
Ing Head; 53.62594°N 1.89446°W	—	1739	A pair of houses, the later dated 1784, in stone and partly rendered, they have a stone slate roof with coped gables, shaped kneelers, and a finial. There are two storeys, four bays, and later extensions. On the front is a modern porch, doorways with stone surrounds, and two datestones, and the windows are mullioned, with some mullions removed, and some lights blocked.	II
6 and 8 New House, Hill Top; 53.61639°N 1.88616°W	—	1741	A stone house, later divided, that has a stone slate roof with finials on the gables. There are two storeys, the doorways have stone surrounds, and the windows are mullioned.	II
5 Yew Tree, Hill Top; 53.61676°N 1.88498°W	—	18th century	The cottage, which is part of a terrace, has been much altered. It is in rendered and painted stone, and has a pantile roof, two storeys, and a lean-to extension. The windows are mullioned, with some mullions removed.	II
2 Holt Laith, Holt Head; 53.60895°N 1.88104°W	—	18th century	The house, which is part of a group, was partly rebuilt in the 19th century. It is in stone with a stone slate roof and two storeys. The doorway has a stone surround, some of the windows are sashes, and the others are mullioned.	II
Cottage adjoining 2 Holt Laith, Holt Head; 53.60882°N 1.88103°W	—	18th century	A stone cottage with quoins, and a stone slate roof with a coped gable and moulded kneelers. There are two storeys, and an L-shaped plan. The doorway has a stone surround, and the windows are mullioned.	II
5 Follingworth and barn, Lower Holme; 53.62422°N 1.90451°W	—	18th century	A barn partly converted for residential use, it is in stone with quoins, and a stone slate roof with a moulded kneeler to the west. The building has two storeys and an extension with a catslide roof to the west. It contains a large doorway with quoins and an oak lintel, partly blocked by a smaller doorway, another doorway with quoins, mullioned windows, and a small vent with a millstone grit surround.	II
26–29 Holme Lane, Lower Holme; 53.62249°N 1.89875°W	—	Mid 18th century	A row of four stone cottages with quoins, and a stone slate roof with moulded kneelers at the southwestern end. There are two storeys, the doorways have stone surrounds, some with deep lintels, and the windows are mullioned, with some mullions removed. To the right is an extension, partly rendered, with a blue slate roof and a modern porch.	II
Barn adjacent to 5 Blakestones, Slaithwaite; 53.62184°N 1.88912°W	—	18th century	A stone barn with quoins, and a stone slate roof with a coped gable and moulded kneelers to the south. On the southwest is an extension with a catslide roof and an entrance with a stone surround, and a large doorway with a segmental head. To the south is a small doorway with a stone surround and a deep inscribed lintel. On the northeast is a doorway with a segmental head and a small vent above.	II
Hollins; 53.60682°N 1.88396°W	—	18th century	A house and barn in stone, the house rendered, with quoins, and a stone slate roof with copings and kneelers to the house. There are two storeys, the west end back to earth. In the house are mullioned windows and a modern porch, and the barn has a large doorway with a semicircular-arched head, partly blocked, a smaller doorway, and single-light windows.	II
Upper Rocher Farm; 53.62028°N 1.89201°W	—	Mid to late 18th century	A former farmhouse at the end of a terrace, it is in stone, on a plinth, with quoins, a stone slate roof, and two storeys. On the front is a doorway with a stone surround and a deep lintel, and at the rear is a doorway with quoins, chamfered reveals, and a pointed lintel with a Tudor arch. The windows are mullioned, with some mullions removed.	II
Lower Wood Farm; 53.61791°N 1.88960°W	—	1767	A farm terrace with a barn in stone, with quoins, and a stone slate roof with a coped gable and moulded kneelers. There are two storeys, and on the front are two doorways with large lintels, and a datestone. Some of the windows have single lights, and most are mullioned, with some mullions removed. The barn has a loading door and roof lights.	II
Linthwaite Riding School; 53.60826°N 1.88053°W	—	1771	A house that has been altered, it is in stone with quoins, and a stone slate roof with coped gables and kneelers. There are two storeys, and two-storey and one-storey extensions, one with a tile roof. The windows are mullioned, some have been altered, and some mullions have been removed. On the south front is a datestone.	II
1 and 2 Pickle Top, Hill Top; 53.62754°N 1.88824°W	—	Late 18th century	Originally two cottages and a barn, they are in stone, with quoins, and a stone slate roof with moulded kneelers to the west. There are two storeys, the ground floor back to earth, and an extension to the rear with a catslide roof. The cottages have a doorway with a stone surround and tie-stones, and mullioned windows. In the barn is a large doorway with segmental-arched head, a stone surround and tie-stones.	II
2 Delves Gate, Holt Head; 53.61046°N 1.88596°W	—	Late 18th century	The house, which has been partly rebuilt, is in stone, partly rendered, with quoins and a stone slate roof. There are two storeys and a later lean-to extension. On the front is a modern porch, and the windows are mullioned, with one blocked light.	II
Cottage and barn, Holt Laith, Holt Head; 53.60876°N 1.88122°W	—	Late 18th century	The cottage and barn are in stone with quoins, a stone slate roof with coped gables and moulded kneelers, and two storeys. The cottage has a doorway with a stone surround, and the windows are mullioned. The barn has a continuous outshut at the rear, and large central doorways with quoins at the front and the rear.	II
1–2 Jim Hill, Holt Head; 53.60809°N 1.88366°W	—	Late 18th century	Two houses, later combined, the building is in stone, with quoins and a stone slate roof. There are two storeys, and single-storey extensions. On the front is a later porch, and the windows are mullioned, with some mullions removed.	II
14–15 Holme Lane, Lower Holme; 53.62215°N 1.89652°W	—	Late 18th century	No. 15 dates from the early 19th century. The houses are in stone, partly rendered, with quoins and a stone slate roof. There are two storeys and later extensions. The doorways have stone surrounds, some windows have single lights, and the others are mullioned.	II
22–23 Holme Lane, Lower Holme; 53.62218°N 1.89869°W	—	Late 18th century	A pair of stone houses, partly rendered, with quoins, and a stone slate roof with coped gables and moulded kneelers. There are two storeys and an attic, and the doorways have stone surrounds. One window has a single light, and the others are mullioned, with some mullions removed.	II
15–16 Blakestones, Slaithwaite; 53.62135°N 1.88969°W	—	Late 18th century	A mirror image pair of cottages in stone, partly rendered, with a stone slate roof. There are two storeys and a single-storey lean-to extension. Each cottage has a doorway with a stone surround, there is one single-light window, and the other windows are mullioned.	II
1 Follingworth, Lower Holme; 53.62403°N 1.90370°W	—	Late 18th century	A detached cottage in stone with millstone grit quoins, and a stone slate roof. There are two storeys and the windows are mullioned.	II
2, 3, 3A and 4 Follingworth, Lower Holme; 53.62419°N 1.90421°W	—	Late 18th century	A terrace of four cottages in stone, with large plinth stones, quoins, a stone slate roof, and two storeys. The doorways have stone surrounds, there are some single-light windows, and most windows are mullioned, with some mullions removed.	II
13–19 Hill Top Road, Slaithwaite; 53.62461°N 1.88108°W	—	Late 18th century	A row of four cottages in a terrace, they are in stone, with quoins and a stone slate roof. There are two storeys, the doorways have stone surrounds, the windows are mullioned, and on the front is a round-arched plaque with a keystone inscribed with initials and a date.	II
22, 24 and 26 Longlands Road, Slaithwaite; 53.62479°N 1.89037°W	—	Late 18th century	A row of three stone houses with large plinth stones, quoins, and a roof partly in stone slate and partly tiled. There are two storeys and an extension to the south. Most of the doorways have stone surrounds and tie-stones, and there is a blocked doorway with a quoined surround. Some windows have single lights, and most are mullioned.	II
Hey Gate; 53.61118°N 1.87676°W	—	Late 18th century	The house, which has been partly rebuilt, is in stone, partly rendered, with quoins and a stone slate roof. The windows are mullioned, one converted from a doorway, the other converted into a doorway, and there is a later doorway with a stone surround.	II
Highfield; 53.63405°N 1.88209°W	—	Late 18th century	A pair of houses in stone, partly rendered, with plinth stones, quoins, and a stone slate roof. The former doorway has been converted into a window, entry is by a modern porch, most of the windows are mullioned, and there are later windows.	II
Holt Farmhouse and cottage 53.61130°N 1.88276°W	—	Late 18th century	The farmhouse and adjoining cottage have been combined into one dwelling. It is in stone, partly rendered, with quoins, the farmhouse with a slate roof, and the cottage with a stone slate roof. There are two storeys and an attic. There are mullioned windows in both parts and a single-light window in the cottage. The doorway in the cottage has a stone surround, and in the farmhouse is a former doorway with a quoined surround and tie-stones.	II
Ivy Mount; 53.62304°N 1.88354°W	—	Late 18th century	A stone house with quoins, and a stone slate roof with a coped gable to the east, and a moulded kneeler to the west. There are two storeys, the central doorway has a stone surround, tie-stones, and a fanlight, and the windows are mullioned, with some mullions removed.	II
Lower Rotcher and barn 53.62081°N 1.88861°W	—	Late 18th century	A house, cottage and barn in a row, they are in stone, with quoins on the cottage, and a stone slate roof with moulded kneelers. There are two storeys, and the cottage to the right is recessed. The doorways in the house and cottage have stone surrounds and tie-stones, and the windows are mullioned. The barn to the left has a central arched doorway with a vent above.	II
Lower Wood Farm and barn 53.61739°N 1.89093°W	—	Late 18th century	Former farm cottages and a barn at right angles, they are in stone, with quoins and a stone slate roof. There are two storeys and an extension at the east end. On the front are two doorways with stone surrounds, and the windows are mullioned, with some mullions removed. The barn has a doorway with a large lintel and quoins.	II
New House and Barn; 53.63348°N 1.89040°W	—	Late 18th century	Two cottages and a barn in one range, they are in stone with quoins and coped gables with a chamfered underside and moulded kneelers. There are two storeys and lean-to extensions. The cottages have a central doorway with stone surrounds, tie-stones, and a large lintel, and there are later doorways. The windows are mullioned with some mullions removed. The barn projects, and contains doorways with large quoins and lintels.	II
Slacks Farm; 53.60844°N 1.88930°W	—	Late 18th century	A former farmhouse and barn in one range in stone, with quoins and a stone slate roof. There are two storeys and lean-to extensions. The house contains mullioned windows with blocked lights and removed mullions, and in the barn is a large central doorway with a stone surround and a deep lintels on rounded corbels, a small vent above, and a smaller doorway with a stone surround and tie-stones.	II
Tom Pits and barn 53.60654°N 1.89295°W	—	Late 18th century	Originally two houses and a barn, the building is in stone, with plinth stones, quoins, and a stone slate roof with coped gables and moulded kneelers to the west. There are two storeys and lean-to extensions. In the house is a doorway with a stone surround, tie-stones and a large lintel, and the windows are mullioned, with one single-light window. The former barn has a doorway with an elliptical-arched head, quoins and a keystone, a smaller doorway, and mullioned windows.	II
Two Gates; 53.62313°N 1.89216°W	—	Late 18th century	Two houses, the later one added in the early 19th century, they are in stone, with quoins, and a stone slate roof. There are two storeys, and lean-to extensions at both ends. The doorways have stone surround, and most of the windows are mullioned, with some lights blocked.	II
St James' Church, Slaithwaite; 53.62270°N 1.88256°W		1789	The church is in Classical style, the chancel was added later, followed by the tower and porches in 1890. It is built in stone with a slate roof, and has two storeys and a basement. The church consists of a nave with a choir at the east end flanked by chapels, a chancel, and a west tower flanked by porches. The tower has four stages, clock faces on all sides, round-arched bell openings, a cornice, and a parapet with paired crocketed pinnacles on the corners. There are two tiers of windows along the sides, and at the east end is a Venetian window above which is an oculus.	II
Canal 5 miles post adjacent to Empire Works; 53.62137°N 1.88557°W		1794–97	The milestone is on the south side of the Huddersfield Narrow Canal. It consists of a rectangular stone post with curved head, and has a round indented face inscribed "5 MILES".	II
Canal Bridge No. 45 at Old Bank; 53.62210°N 1.88223°W		1794–98	The bridge carries a road over the Huddersfield Narrow Canal, it is in stone and consists of a single arch. The bridge has a string course, and a parapet with round coping. To the north, the parapet ends in a rounded buttress, and at the south end is a mounting block.	II
Canal Bridge No. 48 (Shaw Carr Wood Bridge); 53.61894°N 1.89179°W		1794–98	An accommodation bridge over the Huddersfield Narrow Canal, it is in stone and consists of a single arch. The bridge has a string course, and a parapet with round coping. The surface is paved with setts, and there is an overflow to the north.	II
25 Holme Lane, Lower Holme; 53.62236°N 1.89892°W	—	c. 1800	A house with an attached outbuilding later incorporated into the house, it is in stone and has a stone slate roof with a shaped kneeler on the left gable. There are two storeys and two bays, with the single-storey single-bay former outbuilding to the left. The doorways have stone surrounds and the windows are mullioned.	II
57 Clough Road and barn, Clough Head; 53.63907°N 1.87931°W	—	Late 18th to early 19th century	A house and barn in one range in stone, with quoins, and a stone slate roof. There are two storeys and extensions. In the house is a doorway with a stone surround, and mullioned windows with some mullions removed, and some lights blocked. The barn contains a large central doorway with a stone lintel.	II
1 and 3 Waller Clough Road, Clough Head; 53.63853°N 1.88408°W	—	Late 18th to early 19th century	A pair of weavers' cottages with quoins and a tile roof. There are two storeys, a lean-to extension on the west side with a catslide roof, and a later extension to the north. The windows are mullioned, with alternate mullions removed.	II
6 Hill Top; 53.61453°N 1.89272°W	—	Late 18th to early 19th century	A stone house with quoins and a stone slate roof. There are two storeys, and a single-storey lean-to extension. The doorways have stone surrounds, some with tie-stones, and the windows are mullioned, with some lights blocked.	II
9–10 New House, Hill Top; 53.61633°N 1.88636°W	—	Late 18th to early 19th century	A pair of weavers' houses, partly rendered, in stone, with quoins, and a stone slate roof with coped gables and moulded kneelers to the west. There are two storeys and later extensions. The doorway has a stone surround and tie-stones, and the windows are mullioned.	II
3–4 Jim Hill, Holt Head; 53.60816°N 1.88336°W	—	Late 18th to early 19th century	A pair of stone houses with a stone slate roof. There are two storeys, and a lean-to extension with a catslide roof. The windows are mullioned, with some lights blocked, and some mullions removed.	II
13 Linfit Lane, Slaithwaite; 53.62161°N 1.87326°W	—	Late 18th to early 19th century	A stone house, partly rendered, with quoins and a stone slate roof. There are three storeys, and the windows are mullioned, including a ten-light window in the top floor.	II
12–13 Rock Lane, Slaithwaite; 53.63058°N 1.87991°W	—	Late 18th to early 19th century	A pair of stone houses, partly rendered, with quoins, some stone gutter brackets, a stone slate roof, and two storeys. On the front are two porches, there are some single-light casement windows, and the other windows are mullioned, including a ten-light upper floor window with one light blocked.	II
14 Rotcher, Slaithwaite; 53.62018°N 1.89181°W	—	Late 18th to early 19th century	A stone house with quoins, and a stone slate roof with coped gables and moulded kneelers. There are two storeys, and the windows are mullioned. The doorway has a quoined surround and a deep lintel, to its right is a three light window, and in the upper floor are a two-light and a three-light window.	II
Delves Moor Farmhouse; 53.61178°N 1.88852°W	—	Late 18th to early 19th century	The farmhouse is in painted stone, with quoins, and a stone slate roof with coped gables and large moulded kneelers. There are two storeys and a lean-to extension. The doorway has a stone surround and a large lintel, and the windows are mullioned.	II
Lingards Cross Farm and barn 53.60881°N 1.89327°W	—	Late 18th to early 19th century	A house and barn in one range, they are in stone, the house rendered, with quoins, and a stone slate roof with kneelers on the barn. There are two storeys and a single-storey extension. The house contains mullioned windows, with some mullions removed. In the barn is a central doorway with a semicircular head, two smaller doorways, and single-light windows.	II
Oak Farmhouse and barn 53.60805°N 1.88510°W	—	Late 18th to early 19th century	A house and barn in one range, in stone, the house rendered, with a stone slate roof. There are two storeys and lean-to extensions. On the front is a later porch, and the windows are mullioned with one mullion removed. The barn contains a large doorway with a semicircular-arched head over which is a vent, and there are smaller doorways with stone surrounds.	II
Chimney, Platt Mill; 53.62380°N 1.87555°W		Late 18th to early 19th century	The mill chimney is in stone, it is octagonal, and about 100 feet (30 m) high. There are two moulded string courses, the upper one supporting a cornice with a blocking course.	II
Road Bridge over Bradley Brook; 53.60810°N 1.88082°W	—	Late 18th to early 19th century	The bridge carries Holt Head Road over Bradley Brook. It is in stone, and consists of a single horseshoe arch. The bridge has a string course, and parapets with square coping. The inside of the arch is rendered.	II
Scotland Farm; 53.61019°N 1.89267°W	—	Late 18th to early 19th century	A pair of stone houses with quoins, and a stone slate roof with coped gables. There are two storeys, and two doorways with stone surrounds and tie-stones. Some of the windows have single lights, and the others are mullioned, with some mullions removed.	II
Shoulder of Mutton; 53.62239°N 1.88215°W		Late 18th to early 19th century	The public house is in stone, rendered on the front, and has a double-pitched stone slate roof. There are two storeys, the ground floor back to earth. In the centre is a doorway, there is one single-light window, and the other windows are mullioned.	II
46 Carr Lane, Slaithwaite; 53.62413°N 1.87904°W	—	1816	A stone house that has a stone slate roof with coped gables, two storeys and a lean-to extension. In the southwest gable end is a single-light window, and the other windows are mullioned, with six lights in the ground floor and eight lights in the upper floor.	II
Providence Baptist Chapel, railings, gates and gatepiers 53.62077°N 1.87839°W		1816	The chapel, which was enlarged in 1866, is in stone with a hipped roof, in stone slate to the original part, and in slate to the extension. There are two storeys, six bays in the original part, and two bays in the extension, which contains an archway in the ground floor. The two doorways have elliptical-arched heads, and each has Doric pilasters, an architrave, a frieze, a cornice, and a hood mould. Above the left doorway is an inscribed plaque with a moulded surround. The windows have semicircular heads, keystones, and imposts. The grounds of the chapel are enclosed by iron railings with stone gate piers and iron gates.	II
307 Radcliffe Road, Slaithwaite; 53.62664°N 1.87555°W	—	1820	A weaver's house in a row, with stone gutter brackets, and a stone slate roof with coped gables. There are three storeys, the lower two storeys back to earth, and a small lean-to extension. The doorways have stone surrounds, there is one single-light window, the other windows are mullioned, including a ten-light windows, and there is an initialled and dated plaque.	II
309 and 311 Radcliffe Road, Slaithwaite; 53.62667°N 1.87567°W	—	1820	A pair of stone cottages with moulded stone gutters and a stone slate roof. There are two storeys and a basement, the lower part back to earth. The doorways have stone surrounds and tie-stones, the windows are mullioned, and on each cottage is an initialled and dated plaque.	II
1045–1061 Manchester Road, Slaithwaite; 53.62212°N 1.87266°W		1824	A terrace of weavers' houses in stone with a string course and a sill band, stone gutter brackets, and a stone slate roof with a coped gable. The terrace is in two and three storeys, the doorways have stone surrounds, and a loading bay has been converted into a window. The other windows are mullioned, and include a twelve-light window in the top floor. On the front is an inscribed and dated plaque.	II
1388–1398 Manchester Road, Slaithwaite; 53.62158°N 1.87791°W		1825	A terrace of six stone houses with moulded stone gutter brackets, and a stone slate roof, hipped to the east. They are in two and three storeys, and all the openings have stone surrounds. Above each doorway is a single-light window, and the other windows are mullioned. On the front of No. 1394 is a sill band, above which is an inscribed and dated plaque.	II
School Terrace; 53.62027°N 1.88161°W	—	1825	A terrace of three stone houses on a plinth, with rusticated quoins, a string course, stone gutter brackets, and a hipped slate roof. There are two storeys, a symmetrical front of eight bays, and a lean-to extension to the west. Over the middle two bays is a pediment containing an inscribed and dated elliptical plaque. The doorways have stone surrounds, and the windows are sashes.	II
29 Rochdale Road, Clough Head; 53.64031°N 1.88915°W	—	Early 19th century	Originally a laithe house, the building is in stone and has a stone slate roof with coped gables. The house has two storeys and a modern porch. In the former barn is a large central segmental-arched doorway infilled with glass. In both parts, some windows have single lights, and others are mullioned, with some lights blocked.	II
1 Heywoods Farm; 53.61934°N 1.87133°W	—	Early 19th century	The house, part of a group, is in rendered and painted stone, and has a stone slate roof with a coped gable on cut kneelers. There are two storeys, and the windows are mullioned, with some mullions removed.	II
3 Heywoods Farm; 53.61940°N 1.87137°W	—	Early 19th century	The cottage, part of a group, is in rendered stone with a stone slate roof. There are two storeys, and a later flat-roofed extension. The doorway has a stone surround, the windows are mullioned, and in the north gable end is a loading door.	II
3–6 Pickle Top, Hill Top; 53.62741°N 1.88867°W	—	Early 19th century	A terrace of cottages and a barn, they are in stone, and have a stone slate roof with a coped gable and moulded kneelers to the barn. There are two storeys and extensions. The doorways have stone surrounds and tie-stones, and there is one larger doorway with a segmental-arched head. In the barn are two entrances with stone surrounds and tie-stones.	II
1 and 3 Linfit Fold and 1091 and 1093 Manchester Road, Slaithwaite; 53.62203°N 1.87367°W	—	Early 19th century	A group of four back-to-back houses in stone with a stone slate roof and two storeys. The doorways have stone surrounds, some of the windows are single lights, and the others are mullioned.	II
6–10 Linfit Fold, Slaithwaite; 53.62171°N 1.87371°W	—	Early 19th century	A row of three weavers' houses in stone that have a roof of stone slate with coped gables, and moulded kneelers on the north gable. There are three storeys, and each house has a doorway to the right and mullioned windows, with one six-light window in the ground floor, two three-light windows in the middle floor, and one eight-light window in the top floor; some mullions have been removed.	II
129–133 Royd Street, Slaithwaite; 53.62486°N 1.88699°W	—	Early 19th century	A row of three houses, altered later, with stone gutter brackets and a stone slate roof. There are three storeys, the doorways have stone surrounds, there are single-light windows, and most windows are mullioned, with some lights blocked, and some mullions removed.	II
Jerusalem Farmhouse; 53.61530°N 1.86889°W	—	Early 19th century	A farmhouse and former barn in one range, they are in stone with a string course, moulded gutter brackets, and a stone slate roof with coped gables and moulded kneelers. There are two storeys, and the house has a doorway with a stone surround and tie-stones, and mullioned windows. In the barn is a central semicircular-arched doorway, partly blocked to include garage doors, and above is a single-light window.	II
Lockup; 53.62246°N 1.88417°W		1831	The lockup is in stone with rusticated quoins, an embattled parapet, and a flat roof. There is a single storey and it consists of a single cell. In the south front is a doorway with a large inscribed lintel and a false arch.	II
35 Clough Road, Clough Head; 53.63521°N 1.87666°W	—	Early to mid 19th century	A stone house that has a stone slate roof with coped gables. There are two storeys, three bays, and a single-storey outbuilding, recessed on the left. The openings have stone surrounds, and the windows are mullioned, with some blocked lights.	II
19 and 21 Rochdale Road, Clough Head; 53.64030°N 1.88461°W	—	Early to mid 19th century	A pair of weavers' houses in stone, with paired stone gutter brackets, and a stone slate roof with a coped gable to the west. There are two storeys, and it is built back to earth. The doorway has a stone surround, and the windows are mullioned, with two four-light windows in the ground floor, and two six-light windows in the upper floor.	II
12 and 14 Waller Clough Road, Clough Head; 53.63878°N 1.88218°W	—	Early to mid 19th century	A pair of stone cottages, partly rendered, that have a stone slate roof with coped gables and moulded kneelers. There are two storeys and a lean-to on the right. To the left is a doorway with a stone surround and tie-stones, in the lean-to is a single-light window, and the other windows are mullioned.	II
14 and 14A Rochdale Road, Harts Hole; 53.64109°N 1.87954°W	—	Early to mid 19th century	A house and cottage in stone, with stone gutter brackets, and a stone slate roof with a coped gable. There are two storeys, two doorways with stone surrounds, one with tie-stones, and mullioned windows, including a twelve-light window in the upper floor.	II
15 Rochdale Road, Harts Hole; 53.64148°N 1.87989°W	—	Early to mid 19th century	A house with a later extension, it is in stone, and has a stone slate roof with a coped gable. There are two storeys, and the windows are mullioned, including an eleven-light window in the upper floor.	II
New Ing Farm and barn, Harts Hole; 53.64209°N 1.87986°W	—	Early to mid 19th century	A terrace of farm cottages and a barn at right angles, they are in stone, with stone gutter brackets, and a stone slate roof with a coped gable. The cottages have two storeys, modern porches, and mullioned windows with some mullions removed. The barn to the east contains a large central doorway with a segmental-arched head, a stone surround, and tie-stones.	II
6 Yew Tree, Hill Top; 53.61670°N 1.88514°W	—	Early to mid 19th century	A stone house in a terrace that has a stone slate roof with kneelers to the east. There are two storeys, on the front is a modern porch, and the windows are mullioned.	II
3 Delves Moor, Holt Head; 53.60972°N 1.88695°W	—	Early to mid 19th century	The house, which was later extended, is in stone, and has a stone slate roof with coped gables and moulded kneelers. There are two storeys and a single-storey extension. The entrance is in a modern porch, and the windows are mullioned, with some blocked lights.	II
1–3 Holme Lane, Lower Holme; 53.62257°N 1.89577°W	—	Early to mid 19th century	A row of three stone houses with some rendering and a stone slate roof. There are two storeys and extensions. The doorways have stone surrounds, there are some modern windows, and the other windows are mullioned.	II
2 Blakestones, Slaithwaite; 53.62169°N 1.88908°W	—	Early to mid 19th century	A stone house with quoins, stone gutter brackets, a stone slate roof, and three storeys. The doorway has a stone surround, and the windows are mullioned, including a seven-light window in the ground floor.	II
1, 3 and 5 Ing Head, Slaithwaite; 53.62185°N 1.87209°W	—	Early to mid 19th century	A terrace of three stone houses that has a stone slate roof with a cope gable and moulded kneelers on the west. There are two storeys on the front and three at the rear. The doorways have stone surrounds and tie-stones, and the windows are mullioned, with some mullions removed, and some lights blocked.	II
5 Linfit Fold and 1089 Manchester Road, Slaithwaite; 53.62207°N 1.87354°W	—	Early to mid 19th century	A pair of back-to-back houses in stone, with stone gutter brackets and a stone slate roof. There are three storeys at the front and two at the rear. The doorways have stone surrounds, and the doorway on the front has a fanlight. Some of the windows have single lights, and the others are mullioned.	II
11 Nabbs Lane, Slaithwaite; 53.62266°N 1.88469°W	—	Early to mid 19th century	The building is in stone with a string course, stone gutter brackets, and a stone slate roof. There are three storeys, and two doorways with stone surrounds. The windows are mullioned, and in the top floor is an eleven-light window, the five middle lights blocked. In the gable end is a loading door.	II
17 and 19 Nabbs Lane, Slaithwaite; 53.62261°N 1.88494°W	—	Early to mid 19th century	A pair of stone cottages in a row, they are in stone with quoins and a stone slate roof. There are two storeys, on the front are three doorways with stone surrounds and tie-stones, one of which is blocked. Two of the windows have single lights, and the others are mullioned.	II
313 Radcliffe Road, Slaithwaite; 53.62670°N 1.87581°W	—	Early to mid 19th century	A house in a row, it is in stone, with rendered gables, a moulded stone gutter, and a stone slate roof. There are three storeys, the ground floor back to earth. The doorway has a stone surround, and the windows are mullioned, with some lights blocked, and some mullions removed.	II
315 and 317 Radcliffe Road, Slaithwaite; 53.62672°N 1.87593°W	—	Early to mid 19th century	A mirror image pair of houses, with a moulded stone gutter and a stone slate roof. There are two storeys, the ground floor back to earth. The doorways have stone surrounds, there is a single-light window, and the other windows are mullioned.	II
10 Rotcher, Slaithwaite; 53.62031°N 1.89188°W	—	Early to mid 19th century	A stone house in a group, with a grey slate roof. There are two storeys, and a single-storey extension with a stone slate roof to the west. The doorway has a stone surround and tie-stones, and the windows are mullioned, including a seven-light window in the upper floor.	II
12 Rotcher, Slaithwaite; 53.62030°N 1.89174°W	—	Early to mid 19th century	A stone house in a group, with a grey slate roof. There are two storeys, the ground floor back to earth with an extension. The doorway has a stone surround and tie-stones, and the windows are mullioned, including a ten-light window in the upper floor.	II
135 Royd Street, Slaithwaite; 53.62481°N 1.88718°W	—	Early to mid 19th century	A stone house at the end of a terrace, with a stone slate roof, three storeys at the front and two at the rear. Most of the windows are mullioned with three lights.	II
Mount Pleasant; 53.63375°N 1.88712°W	—	Early to mid 19th century	A stone house with stone gutter brackets, and a stone slate roof with coped gables. There are two storeys, the doorways have stone surrounds, and the windows are mullioned, with some mullions removed.	II
Wood End Farm; 53.62971°N 1.87793°W	—	Early to mid 19th century	A cottage, part of a group, it is in stone with a stone slate roof. There are two storeys, and an extension with a catslide roof. The doorway has a stone surround and tie-stones, and the windows are mullioned.	II
Woods; 53.60762°N 1.88196°W	—	Early to mid 19th century	A stone house with a stone slate roof, two storeys, and a single-storey lean-to extension. It has a modern porch, a doorway with a stone surround, some single-light windows, and mullioned windows with some lights blocked.	II
Former Wesleyan Methodist Chapel; 53.62139°N 1.87743°W		1839	The chapel, later converted for residential use, is in stone, with stone gutter brackets, and a hipped stone slate roof. There are two storeys with a string course between the storeys, a front of three bays, and five bays along the sides. The windows in the ground floor have flat heads, the middle window has been converted from a doorway, and in the upper floor the windows have round-arched heads. In the centre is an inscribed plaque.	II
Gates and gate piers, Centenary Methodist Church; 53.62154°N 1.87756°W		c. 1839	The gate piers at the entrance to the forecourt are in stone, they have a square plan and large moulded caps. Between them are decorative iron gates.	II
Lawsons Funeral Parlour; 53.62220°N 1.88260°W		1842	Formerly a school, incorporating earlier material, and since used for other purposes, it is in stone with a parapet and a stone slate roof. There are two storeys and a symmetrical front of five bays. The middle bay is flanked by buttresses, and at the top is a small gable containing carved motifs and an inscription. On the front are two doorways with Tudor arched heads, most of the windows are cross windows, and in the upper floor of the middle bay is an oriel window. Above and under this window, and over the doorways, are more inscriptions.	II
Crimble Viaduct; 53.62564°N 1.87650°W	—	c. 1845	A railway viaduct, the first part built by the Huddersfield and Manchester Railway, and the second part in about 1890. It is in stone with 19 arches, and contains string courses, slightly battered piers at the east end, coped parapets, and at the west end is a massive retaining wall.	II
Slaithwaite Viaduct; 53.62303°N 1.88466°W		c. 1845	A railway viaduct, the first part built by the Huddersfield and Manchester Railway, and the second part in about 1890. It is in stone with 15 semicircular arches, and contains string courses, three slightly battered piers at each end, and coped parapets. The vaults in the southern half are in stone, and in the northern half they are in brick. In the most westerly arch is a datestone.	II
20–24 Lewisham Road, Slaithwaite; 53.62288°N 1.88120°W	—	c. 1850	A row of three houses at the end of a terrace, they are in stone with quoins, and a slate roof with coped gables on moulded kneelers. There are two storeys, six bays, and a lean-to extension on the right. Most of the windows are mullioned, some with round-headed lights, and the doorways have chamfered surrounds and Tudor arched heads. The middle two bays project forward under a gable, and contain a doorway with a hood mould on the right, a four-light window on the left, and two single-light windows above. The outer bays of the other parts are recessed, these bays containing doorways. The windows in the right part have been replaced with modern casements. At the rear each house has a gabled dormer.	II
1–2 New House, Hill Top; 53.61634°N 1.88565°W		Mid 19th century	A stone house, partly rendered, that has a stone slate roof with coped gables. There are two storeys, a symmetrical front of three bays, and a single-storey extension on the right. The central doorway has a chamfered surround, and a Tudor arched head. In the ground floor are two three-light mullioned windows, the upper floor has a continuous ten-light window with four lower lights, and there are continuous hood moulds over the openings in both floors.	II
2 and 4 Lewisham Road, Slaithwaite; 53.62315°N 1.88004°W	—	Mid 19th century	A pair of mirror image houses in stone on a plinth, with stone gutter brackets, and a slate roof with coped gables and moulded kneelers. There are two storeys and four bays. The doorways in the outer bays have chamfered surrounds, Tudor arched heads, and round motifs in the spandrels. The windows have round-arched lights; in the ground floor they are mullioned with three lights, and the top floor contains a single-light window in the outer bays, and a two-light mullioned window in the middle bays.	II
1083–1087 Manchester Road, Slaithwaite; 53.62206°N 1.87331°W	—	Mid 19th century	A terrace of three stone houses with stone gutter brackets and a stone slate roof. There are two storeys and lean-to outbuildings. The windows are mullioned, with three and four lights.	II
8 Royd Street, Slaithwaite; 53.62450°N 1.88201°W	—	Mid 19th century	A stone house at the end of a terrace, with stone gutter brackets, a stone slate roof with coped gables, and two storeys. The central doorway has a chamfered surround, and an arched lintel with carved spandrels, and is flanked by three-light mullioned windows. The upper floor contains a continuous run of five two-light mullioned windows alternating in height. In each floor is a continuous hood mould stepped over the openings.	II
Bank Gate Mill; 53.62403°N 1.88633°W	—	Mid 19th century	The mill is in stone, with a stone slate roof, and a coped gable and a chimney at the west end. At the front are four storeys, with three storeys at the rear. The west front has eight bays of industrial casement windows, and on the east front are central loading doors flanked by casement windows. The north front has six bays of mullioned windows, with a single light and a loading door at each end, and the west front contains casement windows and fire escapes.	II
Britannia Mills Chimney; 53.62150°N 1.88034°W		Mid 19th century	The chimney is in stone, it is octagonal and about 100 feet (30 m) high. The chimney is reinforced with steel tie-bars, and has a brick parapet on a cornice supported by 24 moulded brackets on a string course. Under this are six niches.	II
Lingards Mission Church; 53.61504°N 1.89227°W		1851	Originally a school, later a church, it is in stone with a slate roof. At the west gabled end is a bellcote, and at the east end is a seven-sided finial. Along the sides are three three-light windows, the lights with pointed heads, and above them are hood moulds, and these are flanked by single-light windows. At the east and west ends are six-light windows with a transom, the middle two lights higher, and with a stepped hood mould.	II
6–10 Lewisham Road, Slaithwaite; 53.62303°N 1.88052°W	—	1853	A row of three houses in stone on a plinth, they have a blue slate roof with coped gables on carved kneelers. There are two storeys at the front and three at the rear, and a front of five bays, the outer and middle bays gabled. In the central bay is a doorway with a Tudor arched head and a hood mould, above it is a two-light mullioned window, and in the apex of the gable is a cross motif and the date. The outer bays have a four-light mullioned window on both floors, with pointed-arched lights and hood moulds. There are two more doors with Tudor arched head, and at the rear are two projecting wings.	II
5 miles post 53.61902°N 1.88777°W		Late 19th century	The milepost is on the southeast side of Manchester Road (A62 road}, Slaithwaite. It consists of a cast iron plate on a stone post, and has a triangular plan and a rounded top. On the top is "WAKEFIELD & AUSTERLANDS ROAD" and "SLAITHWAITE", and on the sides are the distances to Huddersfield and Oldham. The makers' names are in small letters.	II
Wesleyan Methodist Sunday School; 53.62147°N 1.87714°W		1878	The Sunday school, later used for other purposes, is in stone with rusticated quoins, and a slate roof with moulded coping to the gable. There are two storeys, a front of three bays, and six bays along the sides. The entrance front is symmetrical, with a pedimented gable, and a central doorway with pilasters, a fanlight, a full entablature, and a blocking course. Flanking the doorway are sash windows, in the upper floor are semicircular-arched windows with imposts and keystones, and the windows along the sides have round heads. In the tympanum of the pediment is an inscription, above which is a quatrefoil opening.	II
