= Wilberlee =

Hamlet in the Colne Valley of West Yorkshire, England

Coordinates: 53.6295°N 1.9006°W

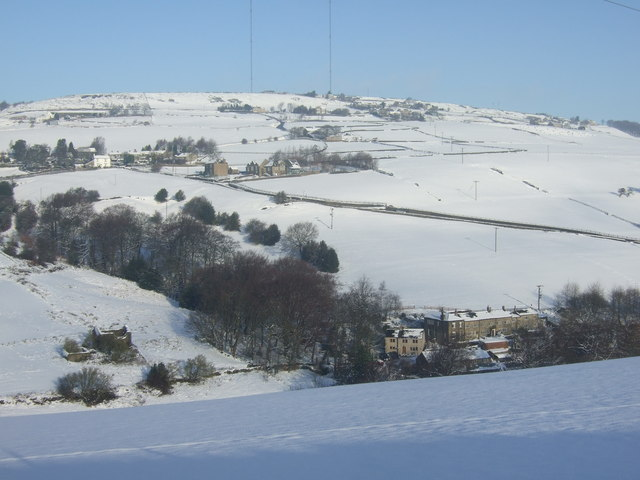
- View towards Wilberlee, situated at the road bend in the middle ground

- Location within West Yorkshire
- Metropolitan borough: Kirklees
- Metropolitan county: West Yorkshire
- Region: Yorkshire and the Humber
- Country: England
- Sovereign state: United Kingdom
- Police: West Yorkshire
- Fire: West Yorkshire
- Ambulance: Yorkshire

Wilberlee is a hamlet in the Colne Valley, in the Kirklees district, in the county of West Yorkshire, England. It is near the town of Huddersfield and the village of Slaithwaite. Wilberlee has a school called Wilberlee Junior and Infant School.

== See also ==
- Listed buildings in Colne Valley (western area)
