= Butterley Reservoir, West Yorkshire =

Reservoir in West Yorkshire, England

Coordinates: 53.591°N 1.929°W

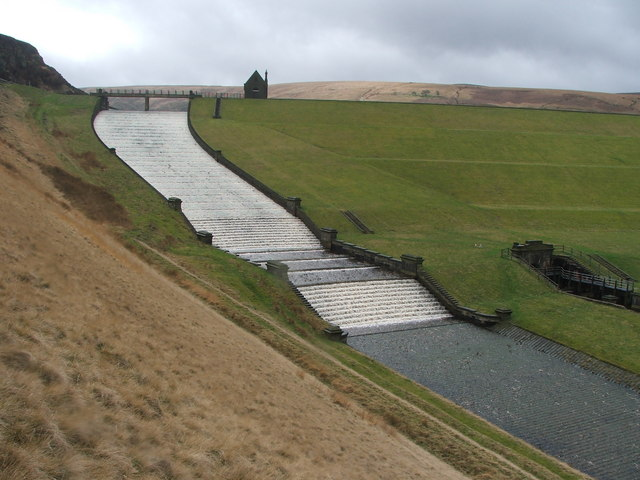
Butterley Reservoir spillway

Butterley Reservoir is a reservoir located near Marsden, West Yorkshire, near the Peak District National Park boundary. It was completed in 1906. The reservoir is known for its long stepped spillway, which is grade II listed.

The reservoir contains 1,607,385 cubic metres (56,764,300 cu ft) of water when full, and drains a catchment area of 1,583 hectares (3,910 acres).
