= Chumbawamba discography =

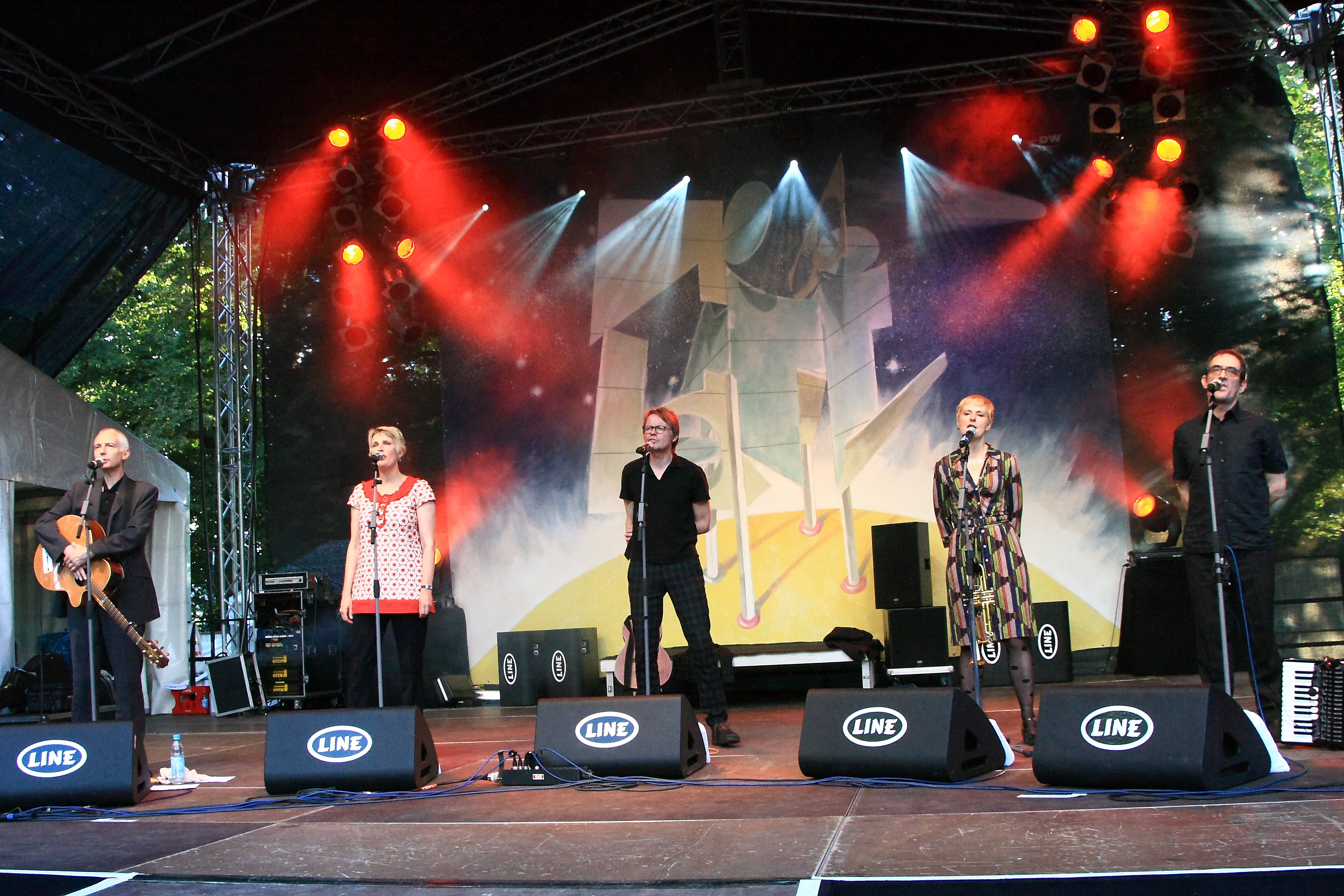
- Chumbawamba performing at the Rudolstadt-Festival in Thuringia in July 2012
- Studio albums: 15
- Extended plays: 4
- Soundtrack albums: 2
- Live albums: 2
- Compilation albums: 4
- Singles: 22
- Video albums: 2
- Music videos: 9
- Miscellaneous releases: 22

English rock band Chumbawamba has released fourteen studio albums, two live albums, three compilation albums, one soundtrack album, two extended plays (EPs), 23 singles, 9 music videos, and a variety of miscellaneous releases.

== Albums ==
=== Studio albums ===
List of studio and live albums, with selected chart positions and certifications
Title	Album details	Peak chart positions					Certifications
Title	Album details	UK	UK Indie	AUS	CAN	US	Certifications
Pictures of Starving Children Sell Records	Released: 1986 (UK); Label: Agit Prop; Formats: CD, LP, digital download; Released on CD by One Little Indian in 1994 as First 2	—	2	—	—	—	
Never Mind the Ballots	Released: 1 May 1987 (UK); Label: Agit Prop; Formats: CD, LP, digital download; Released on CD by One Little Indian in 1994 as First 2	—	2	—	—	—	
English Rebel Songs 1381–1914	Released: 1988 (UK); Label: Agit Prop; Formats: CD, LP, digital download; Reissued 1993 and re-released on CD by One Little Indian in 1995	—	13	—	—	—	
Slap!	Released: 1990 (UK); Label: Agit Prop; Formats: CD, LP, digital download; Reissued 1995 & 1999 by One Little Indian. Re-released on double CD by Mutt in 2003 as Shhhlap!	—	—	—	—	—	
Shhh	Released: 1992 (UK); Label: Agit Prop; Formats: CD, LP, digital download; Re-released in 1994 on Southern Records. Re-released on double CD by Mutt Records in 2003 as Shhhlap!	—	—	—	—	—	
Anarchy	Released: 25 April 1994 (UK); Label: One Little Indian/London Records; Formats: CD, LP, digital download	29	—	—	—	—	
Swingin' with Raymond	Released: 23 October 1995 (UK); Label: One Little Indian; Formats: CD, LP, digital download	70	—	—	—	—	
Tubthumper	Released: 1 September 1997 (UK); Label: EMI/Universal; Formats: CD, LP, digital download	19	—	78	2	3	BPI: Silver; RIAA: 3× Platinum; MC: 4× Platinum
WYSIWYG	Released: 4 April 2000 (UK); Label: EMI/Universal; Formats: CD, LP, digital download	—	—	—	—	—	
Readymades	Released: 18 June 2002 (UK); Label: Mutt; Formats: CD, LP, digital download	—	—	—	—	—	
Revengers Tragedy	Released: 24 March 2003 (UK); Label: Mutt; Formats: CD, LP, digital download; Soundtrack to Alex Cox movie Revengers Tragedy	—	—	—	—	—	
English Rebel Songs 1381–1984	Released: 16 June 2003 (UK); Label: Mutt; Formats: CD, LP, digital download; Re-recording, with two additional tracks, of their 1988 album English Rebel Songs 1381–1914	—	—	—	—	—	
Un	Released: 8 June 2004 (UK); Label: Mutt/Koch Records/Edel Records; Formats: CD, LP, digital download	—	—	—	—	—	
A Singsong and a Scrap	Released: 11 October 2005 (UK); Label: No Masters/Edel Records; Formats: CD, LP, digital download	—	—	—	—	—	
The Boy Bands Have Won	Released: 3 March 2008 (UK); Label: No Masters; Formats: CD, LP, digital download	—	—	—	—	—	
ABCDEFG	Released: 1 March 2010 (UK); Label: No Masters; Formats: CD, LP, digital download	—	—	—	—	—	

=== Soundtrack albums ===
List of soundtrack albums
Title	Release details
Revengers Tragedy	Released: 24 March 2003; Label: Mutt; Formats: CD
Big Society!	Released: 2012; Label: No Masters; Formats: CD; A soundtrack for their musical of the same name.

=== Live albums ===
List of live albums
Title	Release details
Showbusiness!	Released: 1994; Label: One Little Indian; Formats: Cassette; CD; LP
Get On with It	Released: 29 January 2007; Label: No Masters; Formats: CD

=== Compilation albums ===
List of compilation albums with notes
Title	Release details	Notes
The Music's Not a Threat	Released: 1985; Label: Sky & Trees; Formats: Cassette	A compilation of early singles and EPs.
First 2	Released: 1992; Label: Agit-Prop; Formats: Cassette; CD; LP	Box set including the original album releases of Pictures of Starving Children Sell Records and Never Mind the Ballots.
Uneasy Listening	Released: 1998; Label: EMI; Formats: Cassette; CD	A 23-song compilation album that includes songs released from 1986 to 1998. The album primarily features songs from Anarchy and Swingin' with Raymond.
Shhhlap!	Released: 15 July 2003; Label: Mutt; Formats: CD	Box set including the original album releases of Shhh and Slap!

== Extended plays ==
List of extended plays with notes
Title	Release details	Notes
Revolution	Released: 1985; Label: Agit Prop Records; Formats: Vinyl	
Portraits of Anarchists	Released: 1 April 1996; Label: One Little Indian; Formats: CD	EP exclusively bundled with the photography book i-Portraits of Anarchists by Casey Orr.
The ABCs of Anarchism	Released: 27 April 1999; Label: Seeland; Formats: CD	A 3-song EP jointly released with Negativland.
In Memoriam: Margaret Thatcher	Released: 8 April 2013; Label: Self-released; Formats: CD	EP released to celebrate the death of UK Prime Minister Margaret Thatcher.

== Singles ==
Year	Single	Peak chart positions						Certifications	Album
Year	Single	UK	UK Indie	AUS	CAN	FRA	US	Certifications	Album
1986	"We Are the World?" (split single with A State of Mind)	—	4	—	—	—	—		singles only
1988	"Smash Clause 28! Fight the Alton Bill!"	—	5	—	—	—	—		singles only
1990	"I Never Gave Up"	—	—	—	—	—	—		Slap!
1992	"(Someone's Always Telling You How To) Behave"	—	—	—	—	—	—		Shhh
1993	"Enough Is Enough"	56	—	—	—	—	—		Anarchy
1993	"Timebomb"	59	—	—	—	—	—		Anarchy
1994	"Criminal Injustice"	—	—	—	—	—	—		single only
1994	"Homophobia"	79	—	—	—	—	—		Anarchy
1995	"Ugh! Your Ugly Houses!"	84	—	—	—	—	—		Swingin' with Raymond
1996	"Just Look at Me Now"	—	—	—	—	—	—		Swingin' with Raymond
1997	"Tubthumping"	2	—	1	1	38	6	ARIA: 2× Platinum; BPI: 2× Platinum; GLF: Gold; IFPI Norway: Platinum; RMNZ: 2× Platinum	Tubthumper
1998	"Amnesia"	10	—	34	7	—	— (Note: "Amnesia" did not enter the Billboard Hot 100, but peaked at number one on the Bubbling Under Hot 100 Singles chart.)		Tubthumper
1998	"Top of the World (Olé, Olé, Olé)"	21	—	—	—	—	—		Music of the World Cup: Allez! Ola! Ole!
1999	"Tony Blair"	—	—	—	—	—	—		single only
2000	"She's Got All the Friends That Money Can Buy"	—	—	—	—	—	—		WYSIWYG
2003	"Jacob's Ladder (Not in My Name)"	—	—	—	—	—	—		Readymades
2003	"Home with Me"	—	—	—	—	—	—		Readymades
2003	"Salt Fare North Sea"	—	—	—	—	—	—		Readymades
2004	"On eBay"	—	—	—	—	—	—		Un
2004	"The Wizard of Menlo Park"	—	—	—	—	—	—		Un
2006	"Fade Away (I Don't Want To)"	—	—	—	—	—	—		A Singsong and a Scrap

== Compilation appearances ==
(not including top-single compilations)

Song name	Compilation Title	Record label	Year	Notes
"I'm Thick"	Back on the Streets EP	Secret Records	1982	recording as 'Skin Disease', a mock skinhead/Oi! band
"Three Years Later"	Bullshit Detector Volume 2	Crass Records	1982	
"The Police Have Been Wonderful", "Fitzwilliam"	Dig This: A Tribute To The Great Strike LP	Forward Sounds International Limited	1985	Liner notes list Margaret Thatcher on vocals and Neil Kinnock on lead guitar
"Rich Pop Stars Make Good Socialists"		Red Rhino Records	1986	Free flexi with June edition of independent trade magazine The Catalogue. 3 other artists including The Mekons.
"Kinnochio"	Ideal Guest House cassette	Secret Records	1986	
"Knit Your Own Balaclava"	Mindless Slaughter	Anhrefn Records	1987	Re-released in 1989 on "The Liberator" compilation LP
"Younger Moralists"	A Vile Peace	Peaceville Records	1987	
"Tearing Up Zoo"	The A.L.F. Is Watching	No Master's Voice	1988	
"Harry Goldthorpe"	Wild And Crazy Noise Merchants	1 in 12 Records	1990	Benefit CD for the 1 in 12 Club in Bradford, UK
"I Still Haven't Found What I'm Looking For"	No Compromize	Delerium Records	1996	Benefit CD for the Campaign for Free Education; Cover of U2 song
"Homophobia (Live)"	Milkshake	timmi-kat ReCoRDS	1998	Benefit CD for the Harvey Milk Institute; Can be purchased here.
"Top of the World (Ole, Ole, Ole)"	Music of the World Cup: Allez! Ola! Ole!	Columbia Records	1998	Official album for 1998 FIFA World Cup in France
"We Don't Go To God's House Anymore (Acoustic)"	No Ocean Separating Our Desire For Justice	Esan Ozenki Records	1998	Benefit CD for Mumia Abu-Jamal; Performed by Chumbawamba & Alabama 3
"Unilever"	This Is The Animal Liberation Front	Mortarhate Records	1998	Benefit CD for the Animal Liberation Front
"Misbehave"	Return of the Read Menace	G7 Welcoming Committee Records/AK Press	1999	
"Mary Mary (Stigmata Mix)"	Stigmata - Original Soundtrack	Virgin	1999	Remix of song; Featured in opening credits of Stigmata
"Bella Ciao"	Article 14	Irregular Records	2001	Benefit CD for the medical foundation for victims of torture in support of their work on behalf of asylum seekers
"Smart Bomb"	Dropping Food On Their Heads is Not Enough: Benefit For RAWA	Geykido Comet Records	2002	Benefit CD for the Revolutionary Association for the Women of Afghanistan
"Golden Slumbers/Carry That Weight"	With a Little Help From My Friends	Pirate Records	2002	German benefit CD for dolphin aid; Beatles cover
"Without Reason Or Rhyme (Acoustic)"	Kitestringing: The Prison Literature Project Benefit	AK Press	2006	Benefit CD to raise money to buy books for prisoners
"I Drive a Four by Four Four Door Fortress"	Cat Nav: Songs and Poems of Les Barker (Guide Cats for the Blind, Volume 4)	Osmosys Records	2009	Benefit CD for The British Computer Association of the Blind

== Related releases ==
Artist	Song title(s)	Album title	Record label	Year	Notes
Chimp Eats Banana		Cardboard Box	N/A	1980	Cassette only release by proto-Chumbawamba group
Boffo	"Garageland"	Bullshit Detector Volume 2	Crass Records	1982	aka Boff Whalley; Cover of a song by The Clash
Passion Killers	"Start Again"	Bullshit Detector Volume 2	Crass Records	1982	Featuring Chumbawamba members Mavis Dillon, Boff Whalley and Harry Hamer
Passion Killers & Chumbawamba	Side A	Be Happy Despite It All	Sky and Trees	1983	Cassette only release; featuring hand coloured cover
Passion Killers		It's Up To You	Sky and Trees	1984	Cassette only release
Passion Killers & Chumbawamba		Let Us Show Them Our Hearts	Sky and Trees	1984	Cassette only release
Antidote		Destroy Fascism!	Loony Tunes	1986	Features members of Chumbawamba & The Ex
Chumbawamba & Dona Nobis Pacem	Side A	Still Fighting The Fences	Y.U.R.A. Kollektief	1987	Cassette only release
Scab Aid		"Let It Be" b/w "The Scum"	n/a	1987	Alter-ego of Chumbawamba, released in protest of Live Aid
Sportchestra!		101 Songs About Sport	Agit Prop	1988	2 LP release; Collaborations with various other musicians
Passion Killers		Whoopee, We're All Gonna Die EP	Rugger Bugger Discs	1991	7-inch EP of cover songs
Credit to the Nation		"Sowing the Seeds of Hatred"	One Little Indian	1994	12-inch single; Production and remixes by Boff, Harry & Neil
Oysterband	"Jam Tomorrow" & "One Green Hill"	"Jam Tomorrow / One Green Hill"	Running Man Records	1996	12-inch single; Remixes by Chumbawamba
Various Artists		Bare Faced Hypocrisy Sells Records	Ruptured Ambitions	1998	A parody EP released in reaction to Chumbawamba signing to EMI; reissued in 2017 digitally with bonus tracks
Negativland & Chumbawamba		"The ABCs of Anarchism" EP	Seeland Records	1999	Collaboration that extensively samples Chumbawamba
Enemy Within		God Save The Queen	n/a	2002	Side project of Chumbawamba
Hassle Bastards		Sik'O'War	Demo Tapes Records	2017	A side project of Chumbawamba. Recorded in 1985 but not released publicly until 2017.

== Miscellaneous releases ==
Chumbawamba during their early years released several cassette-exclusive releases, often either self-released or through independent labels. They also released a handful of miscellaneous releases later on.

- Another Year of the Same Old Shit (Sky and Trees, 1982)
- "Common Ground" (Sky and Trees, 1984) (Benefit single for striking miners)
- History Luddite, (Homebrew Tapes, 1984) (Live at Luton Library, May 1985)
- To Thine Own Self Be True (Sky and Trees, 1984)
- In the Cellar (Sky and Trees, 1984)
- It Could Be So Much More (Acid Rain Products, 1985) (Joint with Flux of Pink Indians, recorded live at the Conway Hall, London)
- Benefit for Leeds Hunt Saboteurs (Self-released, 1986)
- Know Your Enemy (Doomsday Tapes, 1986) (Live material recorded at the Bull and Gate, London)
- Feed the World, Sell the Rich, 1986 (Live material recorded in Birmingham)
- Un Toast a la Democratie, 1986 (Early live incarnation of "Never Mind the Ballots")
- There Comes a Time, 1987 (Recordings of two shows)
- Still Fighting The Fences (Y.U.R.A., 1987) (Live split with Dona Nobis Placem)
- The Police are Wonderful (1988, R.E.D. Tapes) (Split with Chumbawamba member Danbert Nobacon)
- Raising Heck with Chumbawamba (Peaceville Records, 1989) [recorded 1983/4] (Live material plus songs by Simon Lanzon, also known as Be a Rebel, Raise Some Heck)
- A Toast to Democracy (KomistA, 1989) (Two live performances from 1987)
- Jesus H. Christ (Everyone's Stealing From Someone, 1992) (The original version of what would become Slap!. Was released in limited numbers before being withdrawn for copyright reasons)
- Stitch That! (E.G. Smith Press Audio, 1992) (A live performance from the same year)
- For A Free Humanity: For Anarchy (Allied, 1997) (A release of speeches by Noam Chomsky that features Showbusiness! as a second disc)
- Amnesia (EMI, 1998) (A Japan-exclusive album features remixes and re-recordings of songs from Anarchy and Tubthumper)
- Class War (self-released, 1990s) (Live recordings from the Revolution era to the Slap! era)
- Songs from WYSIWYG Played in a Fetchingly Acoustic Neobilly Style (EMI, 2000) (Re-recordings of songs from WYSIWYG. Promotional release.)
- Her Majesty, an extended cover of The Beatles song with added anti-royal lyrics written in response to Queen Elizabeth’s Golden Jubilee. Released exclusively through their UK mailing list.
- Chumbawamba 1985 (Shellfield Tape Archive, 2015) (A digital release of a live show from 1985)

== Videography ==
=== Video albums ===
Title	Release details	Notes
Well Done, Now Sod Off	Released: 2000; Label: Self-released; Formats: DVD, VHS	A documentary detailing the history of the band up to that point through interviews.
Going, Going	Released: 2012; Label: No Masters; Formats: DVD	A recording of one of the band's final shows.; Released through their website.

=== Music videos ===
Year	Title	Album
1993	"Enough Is Enough"	Anarchy
1993	"Timebomb"	Anarchy
1994	"Homophobia"	Anarchy
1995	"Ugh! Your Ugly Houses"	Swingin' with Raymond
1997	"Tubthumping"	Tubthumper
1998	"Amnesia"	Tubthumper
1998	"Top of the World (Olé, Olé, Olé)"	Music of the World Cup: Allez! Ola! Ole!
2000	"She's Got All the Friends That Money Can Buy"	WYSIWYG
2004	"On eBay"	Un
