= Going, Going – Live at Leeds City Varieties =

Video by Chumbawamba
- Released: 28 January 2013
- Recorded: November 2012
- Venues: Leeds City Varieties, Leeds, UK
- Genres: Live, anarcho-punk, folk
- Length: 101:28
- Label: No Masters

Chumbawamba chronology
| ABCDEFG (2010) | Going, Going – Live at Leeds City Varieties (2013) | In Memoriam: Margaret Thatcher (2013) |

Going, Going – Live at Leeds City Varieties is a live DVD by Chumbawamba. Filmed at Leeds City Varieties on 31 October 2012 and released on 28 January 2013, it records the band's final gig before they split up, bringing to an end a 30–year career.

The DVD features the late–period core lineup of Lou Watts, Boff Whalley, Jude Abbott, Neil Ferguson and Phil Moody, joined for various numbers by previous band members Dunstan Bruce, Danbert Nobacon, Alice Nutter, Harry Hamer and Paul Greco, and guests including O'Hooley and Tidow and Roy Bailey.

A condensed version of the concert was played as a special on BBC Radio Leeds.

== Track listing ==
All tracks are written by Chumbawamba except where otherwise stated

| No. | Title | Writer(s) | Original album | Length |
|---|---|---|---|---|
| 1. | "Introduction" (by Danbert Nobacon) | | | 4:15 |
| 2. | "Add Me" | | The Boy Bands Have Won (2008) | 3:50 |
| 3. | "Song on the Times" | Trad arr. Chumbawamba | English Rebel Songs (1988) | 4:05 |
| 4. | "Voices, that's All" | | ABCDEFG (2010) | 5:29 |
| 5. | "A Stitch in Time" | Mike Waterson | Shhh (1992) | 5:23 |
| 6. | "Jacob’s Ladder" | Chumbawamba and Davy Graham | Readymades (2002) | 4:05 |
| 7. | "Homophobia" | | Anarchy (1994) | 2:35 |
| 8. | "Timebomb" | | Anarchy (1994) | 3:58 |
| 9. | "Torturing James Hetfield" (with Heidi Tidow) | | ABCDEFG (2010) | 4:10 |
| 10. | "By and By" | | A Singsong and a Scrap (2005) | 8:01 |
| 11. | "Word Bomber" (Lead vocals: Roy Bailey) | | The Boy Bands Have Won (2008) | 4:31 |
| 12. | "Ratatatay" | | ABCDEFG (2010) | 4:46 |
| 13. | "(I Don’t Want to) Fade Away" | | A Singsong and a Scrap (2005) | 4:05 |
| 14. | "Big Mouth Strikes Again" (Lead vocals: Danbert Nobacon and Alice Nutter) | | Shhh (1992) | 5:40 |
| 15. | "Pinochet’s Love Song" (Performed by Phil Moody) | | In Memoriam: Margaret Thatcher (2013) | 1:37 |
| 16. | "On eBay" (Lead vocals: Alice Nutter) | | Un (2004) | 5:59 |
| 17. | "A Man Walks Into a Bar" (Lead vocals: Danbert Nobacon) | | Un (2004) | 5:33 |
| 18. | "Tubthumping" (Lead vocals: Dunstan Bruce and Danbert Nobacon) | | [Tubthumper] (1997) | 6:19 |
| 19. | "El Fusilado" | | The Boy Bands Have Won (2008) | 5:17 |
| 20. | "Enough is Enough" | Chumbawamba and MC Fusion | Anarchy (1994) | 5:51 |
| 21. | "Bella Ciao" | Trad arr. Chumbawamba | A Singsong and a Scrap (2005) | 6:00 |
| Total length: | | | | 101:28 |

== Personnel ==
- Jude Abbott: vocals, trumpet
- Neil Ferguson: vocals, guitar
- Phil Moody: vocals, accordion
- Lou Watts: vocals, percussion
- Boff Whalley: vocals, guitar

with

- Harry Hamer: cajon (4, 8–9, 12–14, 16–17, 20–21), drum (6–7, 9, 18), vocals (19)
- Belinda O'Hooley: piano (4–9, 12–14, 16–18, 20–21), vocals (19)

and

- Danbert Nobacon: vocals (1, 14, 17–20)
- Heidi Tidow: vocals (9, 19)
- Roy Bailey: vocals (11, 19)
- Alice Nutter: vocals (14, 16, 19)
- Dunstan Bruce: vocals (18–20)
- Paul Greco: mouth organ (18), vocals (19)
- Barry Coope: vocals (19)
- Ray Hearne: vocals (19)

=== Technical credits ===
- Live sound: Alaric Neville
- Recording: David Crickmore and Steve Warner
- Stage manager: Alyson Howe
- Director: Paul Morricone
- Mix and mastering: Neil Ferguson
- Filming and editing: Bradley TV
- Sleeve design and notes: Boff Whalley
