= Smash Clause 28! Fight the Alton Bill! =

Single by Chumbawamba
- Released: 1988
- Recorded: Woodlands Studio, Castleford, March 1988.
- Genre: Anarcho-punk
- Label: Agit Prop Records
- Songwriter(s): Chumbawamba
- Producer(s): Chumbawamba

Chumbawamba singles chronology
"Let It Be" (1987)	"Smash Clause 28! Fight the Alton Bill!" (1988)	"I Never Gave Up" (1990)

"Smash Clause 28! Fight the Alton Bill!" is a 1988 single from anarcho-punk band Chumbawamba on their Agit Prop Records label. It is a benefit record for the London Lesbian and Gay Switchboard and the Women's Reproductive Rights Campaign.

Clause 28, also known as Section 28, was a controversial bill proposed in the United Kingdom to curtail the promotion or acceptance of homosexuality. The Alton Bill was a set of laws designed to significantly restrict access to abortion in the United Kingdom. As the song titles suggest, the members of Chumbawamba felt strongly that these movements were not in the best interest of the public.

On the record itself the band shout "Clause 29!", which was accurate at the time of recording. Soon after, the bill was changed to Clause 28.

== Track listing ==
- Side A - "Smash Clause 28!"
- Side B - "Fight the Alton Bill!"

== Credits ==
- All songs written and produced by Chumbawamba

Chumbawamba on this record are:

- Alice Nutter - vocals
- Loo - guitar, vocals
- Dunst - bass, vocals
- Boffo - guitar, vocals
- Danbert Nobacon - vocals
- Harry Hammer - drums, guitar
- Simon Lanzon - keyboards, voice
