= Never Mind the Ballots =

Studio album by Chumbawamba
- Released: 1 May 1987
- Recorded: 1987
- Genre: Anarcho-punk; folk punk
- Length: 35:32
- Label: Agit-Prop (UK); Reprise (France)

Chumbawamba chronology
Pictures of Starving Children Sell Records (1986)	Never Mind the Ballots (1987)	English Rebel Songs (1988/2003)

Professional ratings
Review scores
Source	Rating
Maximum Rocknroll	(favourable)
Vox	8/10 stars

Never Mind the Ballots (Note: On streaming services, the album is titled Ballots.) is the second studio album by the anarchist punk band Chumbawamba. Most of the songs center on lying politicians and their search for more voter control. It was originally released on cassette and LP, and re-released in the 1990s as half of the Chumbawamba compilation CD First 2, which is a combination of their first two LP albums released on a single CD.

== Composition ==
The album's lyrics have been noted for criticizing all sides of the United Kingdom's political parties, particularly in the case of the song "The Candidates Find Common Ground."

== Release ==
The album was initially released in 1987. It was reportedly "rush-released" so that it would be available in time for the 1987 United Kingdom general election. In 1991, it was reissued on CD along with Pictures of Starving Children Sell Records; the pair was released under the name First 2.

The album was rereleased digitally on May 4, 2012, by Westpark Music.

== Impact ==
=== Chart performance ===
The album attained a peak of number two on the UK Indie chart.

=== Legacy ===
The album was retrospectively awarded a rating of four stars out of five in The Encyclopedia of Popular Music.

== Track listing ==
Adapted from the record's rerelease via Bandcamp.

1. "Always Tell the Voter What the Voter Wants to Hear" – 2:51
2. "Come on Baby (Let's Do the Revolution)" – 1:39
3. "The Wasteland" – 4:23
4. "Today's Sermon" – 2:28
5. "Ah-Men" – 2:29
6. "Mr. Heseltine Meets His Public" – 3:51
7. "The Candidates Find Common Ground" – 4:29
8. "Here's the Rest of Your Life" – 13:22

== Personnel ==
- Lou Watts – vocals, guitar
- Harry Hamer – drums, percussion, vocals
- Mavis Dillon – bass guitar, trumpet, vocals
- Alice Nutter – vocals
- Danbert Nobacon – vocals
- Boff Whalley – guitar, vocals
- Dunstan Bruce – vocals

Additional personnel

- Simon "Commonknowledge" Lanzon – keyboards, vocals
- Neil Ferguson – engineer, keyboards
- Patrick Gordon – engineer
