= Revolution (Chumbawamba EP) =

EP by Chumbawamba
- Released: 1985
- Recorded: Woodland Studios, 1985
- Genre: Anarcho-punk
- Label: Agit Prop Records
- Producer: Chumbawamba

Chumbawamba chronology
Revolution (1985)	We Are the World? (1986)

"Revolution" is the first EP released in vinyl format by the band Chumbawamba on their label Agit-Prop Records.

Released in 1985, the EP is now a rare collector's item with less than one thousand copies in existence.

The songs have not appeared on any of their studio or compilation albums.

== Track listing ==
As listed on cover:

"1......HMV side, introduction to History and where we stand. Which side of the"
"2......Fence side, and its application to everyday life. The R'n'R Factory strike."

Songs on EP:

1. "Adversity"
2. "Total Control"
3. "Stagnation"
4. "Liberation"
5. "The Police Have Been Wonderful"
6. "Fitzwilliam"

== Credits ==
- Engineered by Neil Ferguson
- All songs written and produced by Chumbawamba

Chumbawamba on this record are:

- Alice Nutter - vocals
- Man Afraid (a.k.a. Mavis Dillon) - guitar, drums
- Loo - guitar, vocals
- Dunst - bass, vocals
- Boffo - guitar, vocals
- Danbert Nobacon - vocals
- Artmi (a.k.a. Harry Hammer) - drums, guitar
- Simon Lanzon - keyboards, voice
