= Pictures of Starving Children Sell Records =

Studio album by Chumbawamba
- Released: 1986
- Recorded: August 1986
- Genre: Anarcho-punk; post-punk; folk punk; experimental pop
- Length: 33:04
- Label: Agit-Prop (UK); Southern (US)

Chumbawamba chronology
Pictures of Starving Children Sell Records (1986)	Never Mind the Ballots (1987)

Professional ratings
Review scores
Source	Rating
AllMusic	4.5/5 stars
St Petersburg Times	(favourable)
Vox	7/10 stars

Pictures of Starving Children Sell Records is the debut studio album by British band Chumbawamba, released in 1986 on Agit-Prop Records. It was released as criticism to Band Aid and Live Aid.

== Track listing ==
All tracks are written by Chumbawamba.

No.	Title	Length
1.	"How to Get Your Band on Television: "Prelude"; "Slag Aid"	8:22
2.	"British Colonialism and the BBC"	2:51
3.	"Commercial Break"	1:02
4.	"Unilever"	4:23
5.	"More Whitewashing"	3:42
6.	"An Interlude: Beginning to Take It Back"	2:41
7.	"Dutiful Servants and Political Masters"	2:15
8.	"Coca-Colanisation"	2:13
9.	"...And in a Nutshell"	0:54
10.	"Invasion"	5:07
Total length:		33:04

== Track details ==
"How to Get Your Band on Television" critiques Paul McCartney, Freddie Mercury, David Bowie, Mick Jagger, Keith Richards and Cliff Richard's self-promotional techniques, such as Queen's playing in apartheid South Africa. Following a slew of Live Aid-style promotions, sequels and events and the death of Mercury, it was re-written in the 1990s as "Slag Aid", retaining most of the original lyrics. The version released on the live album Showbusiness! also references McCartney, but adds Axl Rose, Michael Jackson and John Lydon as more modern examples.

== Personnel ==
=== Band members ===
- Harry Hamer – drums, vocals, guitar solo on "Slag Aid"
- Alice Nutter – vocals
- Boff Whalley – guitar, vocals, clarinet
- Mavis Dillon – bass, trumpet, French horn, vocals
- Lou Watts – vocals, guitar
- Danbert Nobacon – vocals
- Dunstan Bruce – percussion

=== Additional personnel ===
- Simon "Commonknowledge" Lanzon – keyboards, accordion, vocals
- Neil Ferguson – engineer
