= Hanging on the Old Barbed Wire =

World War I song

"Hanging on the Old Barbed Wire" (Roud 9618) is a British war song of World War I. The song sarcastically recounts the location of various army members, not to be found in the combat zone, and concludes by describing the location of the old battalion: "hanging on the old barbed wire". A barbed wire fence separated the front-line trench from no man's land, and men brave or unfortunate enough to go over the top of the dug-out were often quickly shot and their bodies caught in the barbed wire. This troop song was not popular with officers, who thought it bad for morale, though attempts to suppress it were unsuccessful.

== Lyrics ==
There are several different versions of this song, though all share the final two lines. One version:

If you want to find the Sergeant,
I know where he is, I know where he is, I know where he is.
If you want to find the Sergeant, I know where he is,
He's lying on the canteen floor.
I've seen him, I've seen him, lying on the canteen floor,
I've seen him, I've seen him, lying on the canteen floor.

If you want to find the Quarter-bloke
I know where he is, I know where he is, I know where he is.
If you want to find the Quarter-bloke, I know where he is,
He's miles and miles behind the line.
I've seen him, I've seen him, miles and miles and miles behind the line.
I've seen him, I've seen him, miles and miles and miles behind the line.

If you want the Sergeant-major,
I know where he is, I know where he is, I know where he is.
If you want the Sergeant-major, I know where he is.
He's tossing off the privates' rum.
I've seen him, I've seen him, tossing off the privates' rum.
I've seen him, I've seen him, tossing off the privates' rum.

If you want to find the C.O.,
I know where he is, I know where he is, I know where he is.
If you want the C.O., I know where he is
He is down in a deep dug-out,
I've seen him, I've seen him, down in a deep dug-out,
I've seen him, I've seen him, down in a deep dug-out.

If you want the old battalion,
I know where they are, I know where they are, I know where they are
If you want to find the old battalion, I know where they are,
They're hanging on the old barbed wire,
I've seen 'em, I've seen 'em, hanging on the old barbed wire.
I've seen 'em, I've seen 'em, hanging on the old barbed wire.

A variant last line is "if you want to find the privates".

Another variation fourth verse sees C.O replaced with colonel, put at the start and, "He's On another 7 days leave".

== Covers ==
The song was included on the 1988 album English Rebel Songs 1381–1914 by the English anarchist punk band Chumbawamba, as well as on their 2003 re-recording of the same album (English Rebel Songs 1381–1984).

A shortened version of the song was also included on the 2018 album The Blind Leading the Blind by the Ukrainian metal band 1914 as an interlude. The band's songs are all related to WWI events.

The song was covered by death industrial band Maruta Kommand on their 2000 album "Holocaust Rites".

The song is part of the "Great War Trilogy" (The Valley of the Shadow / The Old Barbed Wire / Long, Long Trail) sung by John Roberts and Tony Barrand in their album, A Present from the Gentlemen: A Pandora's Box of English Folk Songs (Golden Hind Music, GHM-101, 1992).

The Russian version of the song was included by Russian Folk rock band ru:Sherwood on their album "Zaduy Skorey Svechu" published in 2022 via ONErpm.

The tune of the song is whistled in the opening of the documentary They Shall Not Grow Old and is listed on the soundtrack by Plan 9 as "If You Want to Find."
