= Kunstlump =

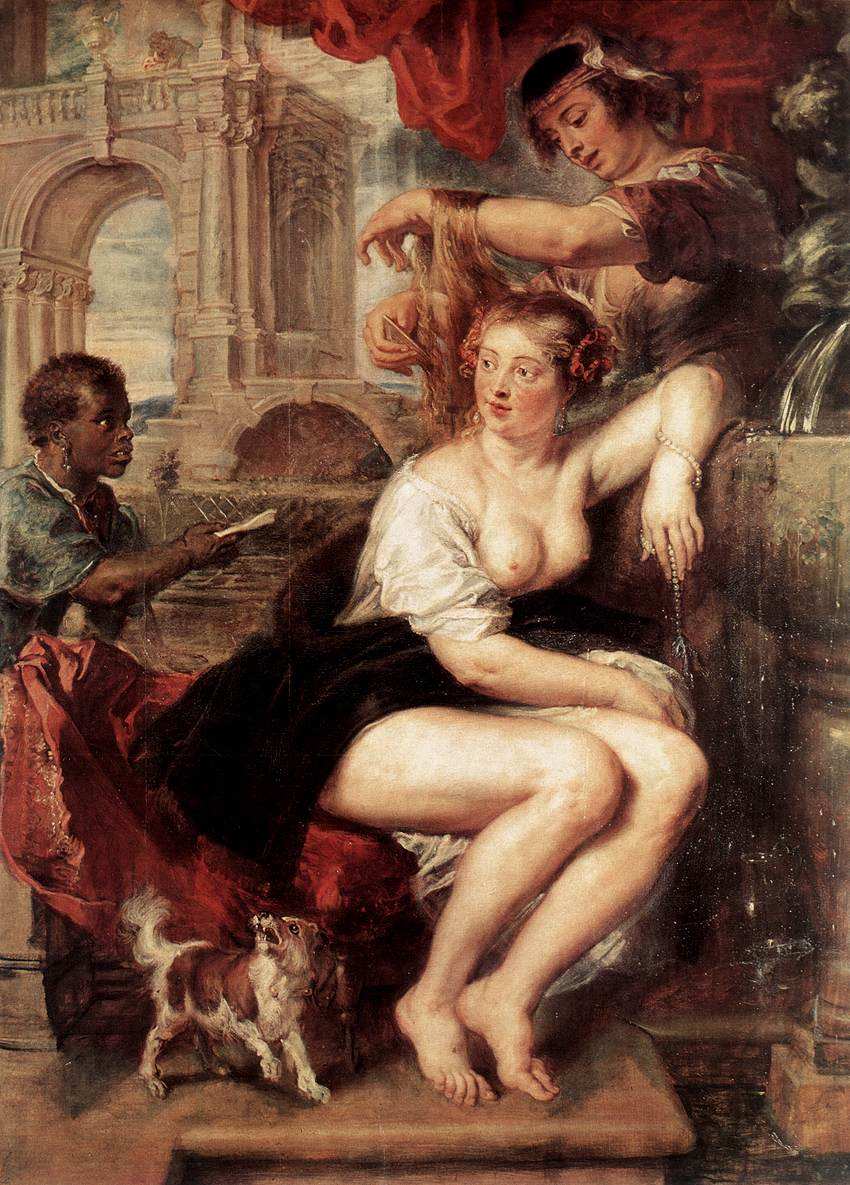
Rubens painting, Bathsheba at the Fountain, damaged in the fighting

Kunstlump refers to a debate in Germany in 1920 which arose after Oscar Kokoschka complained that violent confrontation which arose during the Kapp Putsch had damaged a painting in the Semper Gallery located in the Zwinger. He argued that the value of a painting by Peter Paul Rubens was of greater importance than the lives of people killed in the confrontation and suggested that field of combat should be relocated to heathland. This elicited a sharp response from George Grosz and John Heartfield.

Kokoschka's original appeal had appeared in over forty newspapers following the events of 15 March 1920 in Postplatz, Dresden. In clashes between striking workers and soldiers involved in the Kapp Putsch, 59 people died with 150 wounded. However one bullet entered the gallery and damaged Bathsheba at the Fountain, which Rubens had painted in 1635. Kokoschka had been appointed professor at the Dresden Academy of Fine Arts in 1919.

Georg Grosz, who had been a student at the Dresden Academy 1909 to 1911 and John Heartfeld published a text, "Der Kunstlump", in Der Gegner.

== In popular culture ==
- The anarchist punk band Chumbawamba released a song about the event and surrounding debate, entitled Rubens Has Been Shot!, in their 1990 album Slap!.
