= Slap! =

Studio album by Chumbawamba
- Released: 1990
- Recorded: 1989
- Genres: Anarcho-punk; dance-rock
- Length: 46:20
- Labels: Agit-Prop (UK, 1990): Virgin; One Little Indian; (UK, 1998); Reprise (France)

Chumbawamba chronology
English Rebel Songs 1381-1984 (1988)	Slap! (1990)	Shhh (1992)

Professional ratings
Review scores
Source	Rating
Allmusic	4/5 stars
DooDah	(favourable)

Slap! is the fourth studio album by anarchist punk band Chumbawamba. A radical redefinition of the band's sound and attitude, the songs now inspire dancing more than moshing, and the lyrics are celebratory as opposed to victimist. The cover art is the popular kitsch painting Chinese Girl (1952) by Vladimir Tretchikoff.

== Track listing ==
#	Song name	Length	Notes
1	"Ulrike"	6:06	Ulrike Meinhof was Red Army Faction founder and left-wing author; contains a sample from the song "Can't Help Falling in Love With You" performed by Elvis Presley.
2	"Tiananmen Square"	5:23	About the Tiananmen Square protests of 1989; contains a sample from Philip Glass' song "Serra Pelada" from Powaqqatsi.
3	"Cartrouble"	4:47	About American novelist Zora Neale Hurston.
4	"Chase PC's Flee Attack by Own Dog"	4:14	
5	"Rubens Has Been Shot!"	3:56	About an incident in 1920 Dresden when fighting between workers and the German army led to damage to a Peter Paul Rubens painting in the Zwinger Gallery, as the reaction was more critical of the damage to artwork than the loss of life.
6	"Rappaport's Testament: I Never Gave Up"	7:10	Different version, titled "I Never Gave Up" released as single in 1992; inspired by the Primo Levi novel Moments of Reprieve, about life in Nazi concentration camps.
7	"Slap!"	6:10	About former MP Bernadette Devlin's assault on MP Reginald Maudling, whose policies towards Northern Ireland contributed to the Bloody Sunday incident.
8	"That's How Grateful We Are"	6:16	About the bad working conditions in Soviet-era Hungary that led to the short-lived Hungarian Revolution of 1956, and the destruction of a statue of Iosif Stalin, as a metaphor for the conditions of the working class around the world.
9	"Meinhof"	2:14	Instrumental reprise of "Ulrike".

== Personnel ==
- Lou Watts – vocals, guitar
- Dunstan Bruce – vocals, percussion, soprano saxophone
- Harry Hamer – drums, percussion
- Alice Nutter – vocals
- Danbert Nobacon – vocals
- Boff Whalley – guitar, vocals, clarinet
- Cobie Laan – live recording
- Mavis Dillan – bass, trumpet, vocals
- Simon "Commonknowledge" Lanzon – keyboards, accordion, piano

Additional personnel

- Alan Wilkinson – alto and baritone saxophones
- Neil Ferguson – keyboards
- Dill – whine
- Dere – woof
- Mia – vocals
- Tanja (formerly Tania) – mouth organ, vocals

Also appearing on the album are Carl Douglas, Elvis Presley, Mark E. Smith, Dagmar Krause, Philip Glass, Adam Ant, Ladysmith Black Mambazo, George Gershwin, Penny Rimbaud, Jake Burns, Rob 'n' Raz, Lenny Bruce, Muzsikás Ensemble, Mark Perry, Gang of Four, and Poly Styrene.
