= The Boy Bands Have Won =

Studio album by Chumbawamba
- Released: 3 March 2008
- Recorded: 2007
- Genre: Folk
- Length: 49:32
- Labels: No Masters, Westpark

Chumbawamba chronology
Get on with It (2006)	The Boy Bands Have Won (2008)	ABCDEFG (2010)

Professional ratings
Review scores
Source	Rating
AllMusic	4/5 stars

The Boy Bands Have Won (Note: Full title: The Boy Bands Have Won, and All the Copyists and the Tribute Bands and the TV Talent Show Producers Have Won, If We Allow Our Culture to Be Shaped by Mimicry, Whether from Lack of Ideas or from Exaggerated Respect. You Should Never Try to Freeze Culture. What You Can Do Is Recycle That Culture. Take Your Older Brother's Hand-Me-Down Jacket and Re-Style It, Re-Fashion It to the Point Where It Becomes Your Own. But Don't Just Regurgitate Creative History, or Hold Art and Music and Literature as Fixed, Untouchable and Kept Under Glass. The People Who Try to 'Guard' Any Particular Form of Music Are, Like the Copyists and Manufactured Bands, Doing It the Worst Disservice, Because the Only Thing That You Can Do to Music That Will Damage It Is Not Change It, Not Make It Your Own. Because Then It Dies, Then It's Over, Then It's Done, and the Boy Bands Have Won.) is the thirteenth studio album by British music group Chumbawamba, released in 2008. Its full title contains 156 words (865 characters), and holds the Guinness World Record for the longest album title, beating Soulwax's Most of the Remixes' 552-character-long title as of September 2021.

== Background ==
The album continues the band's move into politically and socially aware folk music. Themes addressed on this album include suicide bombers, Philip Larkin, social networking websites, surviving a firing squad, evolution, and the pains of the workplace.

The album was recorded by the five-piece line-up of Jude Abbott, Lou Watts, Boff Whalley, Neil Ferguson, and Phil "Ron" Moody and features guest appearances by several other artists.

The album's full title (decapitalized) reads:

The boy bands have won, and all the copyists and the tribute bands and the TV talent show producers have won, if we allow our culture to be shaped by mimicry, whether from lack of ideas or from exaggerated respect. You should never try to freeze culture. What you can do is recycle that culture. Take your older brother's hand-me-down jacket and re-style it, re-fashion it to the point where it becomes your own. But don't just regurgitate creative history, or hold art and music and literature as fixed, untouchable and kept under glass. The people who try to 'guard' any particular form of music are, like the copyists and manufactured bands, doing it the worst disservice, because the only thing that you can do to music that will damage it is not change it, not make it your own. Because then it dies, then it's over, then it's done, and the boy bands have won.

== Track listing ==
All tracks written, arranged, and produced by Chumbawamba except where noted.

No.	Title	Notes	Length
1.	"When an Old Man Dies"		0:54
2.	"Add Me"	Featuring the Charlie Cake Marching Band	3:27
3.	"Words Can Save Us"		1:52
4.	"Hull or Hell"	With vocals by Oysterband	3:31
5.	"El Fusilado"	With vocals by Ray Hearne and Coope Boyes and Simpson	2:32
6.	"Unpindownable"		1:22
7.	"I Wish That They'd Sack Me"	Traditional; arrangement and lyrics by Chumbawamba	4:10
8.	"Word Bomber"	With vocals by Roy Bailey	2:13
9.	"All Fur Coat & No Knickers"		2:12
10.	"Fine Line"		0:39
11.	"Lord Bateman's Motorbike"		3:34
12.	"A Fine Career"	With vocals by Robb Johnson	0:47
13.	"To a Little Radio"	Music by Hanns Eisler, lyrics by Bertolt Brecht translated by Chumbawamba	1:08
14.	"(Words Flew) Right Around the World"	Featuring the Charlie Cake Marching Band	2:15
15.	"Sing About Love"		1:39
16.	"Bury Me Deep"		1:37
17.	"You Watched Me Dance"		0:58
18.	"Compliments of Your Waitress"		2:43
19.	"R.I.P. RP"		1:26
20.	"Charlie"	Traditional; arrangement and lyrics by Chumbawamba	2:12
21.	"The Ogre"		0:53
22.	"Refugee"		2:42
23.	"Same Old Same Old"		0:59
24.	"Waiting for the Bus"		2:44
25.	"What We Want"		0:47
Total length:			48:41

== Samples from previous albums ==
Song	Sample from
"When an Old Man Dies"	"Rubens Has Been Shot!" from Slap!
"All Fur Coat & No Knickers"	"Social Dogma" from WYSIWYG
"Fine Line"	"Rappoport's Testament: I Never Gave Up" from Slap!
"Lord Bateman's Motorbike"	"Happiness is Just a Chant Away" from Shhh
"You Watched Me Dance"	"I'm Coming Out" and "Dumbing Down (Piano Version)" from WYSIWYG
"Charlie"	"Chase PC's Flee Attack by Own Dog" from Slap!
"The Ogre"	"Digger's Song" from English Rebel Songs 1381–1984
"Refugee"	"Fade Away (I Don't Want to)" from A Singsong and a Scrap

== Personnel ==
- Lou Watts – vocals
- Boff Whalley – vocals, ukulele
- Neil Ferguson – vocals, guitars
- Jude Abbott – vocals, trumpet
- Phil "Ron" Moody – vocals, accordion

Additional musicians

- Oysterband, Roy Bailey, Robb Johnson, Ray Hearne, Barry Coope & Jim Boyes – vocals
- Charlie Cake Marching Band – brass
- David P. Crickmore – banjo on 7, 22; square-necked dobro on 18, 22
- Jo Freya – sax on 2
- Harry Hamer – cajon on 9, 11; tablas on 16
- The Pudsey Players – strings on 6, 11, 18
