= ABCDEFG (album) =

Studio album by Chumbawamba
- Released: 1 March 2010
- Recorded: Late 2009
- Genre: Folk
- Length: 44:31
- Label: No Masters

Chumbawamba chronology
| The Boy Bands Have Won (2008) | ABCDEFG (2010) | Going, Going – Live at Leeds City Varieties (2013) |

Professional ratings
Review scores
| Source | Rating |
|---|---|
| AllMusic | 3.5/5 stars |
| The Music Fix | (7/10) |

ABCDEFG is the fourteenth and final studio album by British rock band Chumbawamba. It was officially released on 1 March 2010, but copies that were pre-ordered from the band's website arrived the week before.

== Album information ==
ABCDEFG continues the five-person line up of Lou Watts, Jude Abbott, Neil Ferguson, Boff Whalley and Phil 'Ron' Moody. The album's lyrical content focuses mainly on themes to do with music and singing.

"Wagner at the Opera" refers to a concentration camp survivor who disrupted a Wagner recital by swinging a football rattle. "Torturing James Hetfield" is a response to James Hetfield's unoffended reaction to the use of Metallica's music as a torture device against Iraqi prisoners at the Guantanamo Bay detention camp. The song was described as depicting a "wonderful image" by Stefan Appleby in BBC Review. Boff Whalley listed the song as one of his favourites in July 2011. The song "Ratatatay" is about George Melly's experience of being confronted by thugs, who ran off after he recited The Ursonate, a sound poem by Kurt Schwitters.

== Track listing ==
All tracks are written by Chumbawamba except where noted.

| No. | Title | Writer(s) | Length |
|---|---|---|---|
| 1. | "Introduction" | | 1:01 |
| 2. | "Voices, That's All" | | 3:30 |
| 3. | "Pickle" | | 2:43 |
| 4. | "Wagner at the Opera" | | 2:13 |
| 5. | "Underground" | | 3:30 |
| 6. | "Torturing James Hetfield" | | 2:17 |
| 7. | "The Devil's Interval" | | 4:00 |
| 8. | "Hammer, Stirrup & Anvil" | | 3:04 |
| 9. | "Puccini Said" | | 2:02 |
| 10. | "That Same So-So Tune" | | 2:35 |
| 11. | "Singing Out the Days" | | 2:18 |
| 12. | "You Don't Exist" | | 2:36 |
| 13. | "The Song Collector" | | 3:26 |
| 14. | "Missed" | | 1:40 |
| 15. | "Ratatatay" | | 3:40 |
| 16. | "New York Song" | | 1:13 |
| 17. | "Dance, Idiot, Dance" | No Masters Co-operative | 2:43 |

== Personnel ==
- Chumbawamba: Neil Ferguson, Lou Watts, Boff Whalley, Jude Abbott & Phil Moody
- Ray 'Chopper' Cooper – cello on 3, 5 & 7, harmonica on 12
- Jon Boden – fiddle on 2, 7 & 12
- Belinda O'Hooley – piano on 3, 6 & 7, backing vocals on 3
- Heidi Tidow – backing vocals on 3
- Harry Hamer – cajon on 2, 7 & 15
- Jo Freya – saxophone on 10, 15 & 17
- 'Dance, Idiot, Dance' performed by "the massed No Masters Co-operativists" with Lester Simpson on lead vocals
- Brass by Charlie Cake Marching Band, arr. Jude Abbott
- Strings by Whingate Ensemble, arr. Neil Ferguson
