= Tony Blair (song) =

Single by Chumbawamba
- Released: December 1999
- Recorded: 1999; Woodlands Studio, Castleford, United Kingdom
- Genre: Doo-wop
- Length: 3:05
- Songwriter: Chumbawamba
- Producers: Chumbawamba & Neil Ferguson

Chumbawamba singles chronology
"Top of the World (Ole, Ole, Ole)" (1998)	"Tony Blair" (1999)	"She's Got All the Friends That Money Can Buy" (2000)

"Tony Blair" is a single by Chumbawamba which was made available exclusively to their United Kingdom mailing list as a Christmas present in December 1999.

== Background ==
Chumbawamba had long been critical of the administration of British Prime Minister Tony Blair and his New Labour Party, with Blair's "alleged perfidy" among the topics of their 1997 breakout album, Tubthumper. At the 1998 Brit Awards, band member Danbert Nobacon leaned into the face of the Prime Minister's wife, Cherie Blair, to sing the line "New Labour have sold out the dockers, just like they'll sell out the rest of us", and later at the show dumped a jug of water in the face of deputy Prime Minister John Prescott as revenge for his resisting calls to recognize the Liverpool dock workers' strike. Group vocalist Alice Nutter later revealed that the band had hoped that Blair himself would be present at the awards show, telling the Mirror that "We hate the Labour Party […] because they've sold out. They're rubbish. We hoped Tony Blair would be [at the awards show] so we could all go up and spit in his bubbly."

== Composition and lyrics ==
The Guardian described the song as a "retro tale of puppy love with a double-crossing dreamboat". Its lyrics include "Tony, now you date/All the girls that you used to hate/So I don't believe a single word you say."

== Single art ==
The cover art pays tribute to the iconic artwork of Elvis Presley's debut album, which was also referenced by The Clash's London Calling album cover.

== Reception ==
Rupert Perry, the head of EMI Records UK at the time, was reportedly very displeased with the band for issuing the single, and sent them a letter which included the statement "I actually think Tony is really fab". All copies of the CD in EMI offices were later confiscated.

The song can be downloaded in mp3 format from the band's website.

== Track listing ==
No.	Title	Length
1.	"Tony Blair"	3:05
