= English Rebel Songs =

English Rebel Songs 1381–1914
- Cover art of original 1988 LP

Studio album by Chumbawamba
- Released: 1988/2003
- Recorded: 1988/2003
- Genre: Folk, a cappella
- Length: 36:28
- Label: Agit-Prop Records/MUTT

Chumbawamba chronology
| Never Mind the Ballots (1987) | English Rebel Songs 1381–1914 (1988) | Slap! (1990) |

English Rebel Songs 1381–1984
- Cover art for 2003 re-recording

Chumbawamba chronology
| Readymades (2002) | English Rebel Songs 1381–1984 (2003) | Revengers Tragedy (2003) |

English Rebel Songs is the third studio album by English band Chumbawamba.

It was originally released on LP and cassette in 1988 as English Rebel Songs 1381–1914. This version was released on CD in 1994 by One Little Indian Records.

It was re-recorded in 2003, with two additional tracks, as English Rebel Songs 1381–1984, released on the band's newly formed MUTT Records label.

Composed mostly of traditional English protest songs, the recording was a stark contrast to the group's previous punk recordings, pointing towards the band's future integration of folk and a cappella music, as well as a greater focus on harmony in their musical sound. The 2003 recording added some light instrumentation on some tracks.

Some of the songs come from Stand Together by Hackney and Islington music group, 100 Songs Of Toil by Karl Dallas, A Touch On The Times, and A Ballad History of England by Roy Palmer. Many of the songs are still performed by modern English folk bands such as The Houghton Weavers and Coope, Boyes & Simpson.

== Reception ==
Allmusic called the album "eloquent", with "utterly relevant" songs, emphasizing that the singing in the 1988 version "was far better than anyone expected", and commending the improved technical quality of the 2003 recording, while The Independent praised the album as having "rousing" songs, with "excellent" vocal performances, but expressed concern that there were no songs from later than 1984.

== Track listing ==
| # (1988) | # (2003) | Song name | Length (2003) | Year | Notes |
|---|---|---|---|---|---|
| 1 | 1 | "The Cutty Wren" | 1:55 | 1381? | Said to have been written during the Peasants' Revolt, but not recorded before 1776 |
| 2 | 2 | "The Diggers' Song" | 2:31 | 17th century | Written by Gerrard Winstanley, leader of the Diggers |
| 3 | 3 | "Colliers' March" | 2:28 | 1782 | Written by John Freeth; Refers to a march of workers in Birmingham protesting at the price of bread |
| 4 | 4 | "The Triumph of General Ludd" | 3:02 | 1812 | Refers to the Luddite Rebellion |
| 5 | 5 | "Chartist Anthem" | 1:34 | 1847 | Written by Ben Boucher. Refers to the People's Charter drawn up by the Chartists in 1838 demanding universal suffrage |
| - | 6 | "The Bad Squire" | 3:54 | 1847 | Adaptation of a poem by Charles Kingsley written in defence of poachers. |
| 6 | 7 | "Song on the Times" | 2:35 | 1840s | Written after the repeal of the Corn Laws |
| 7 | 8 | "Smashing of the Van" | 2:09 | 1867 | Refers to the Manchester Martyrs who were hanged in Manchester for shooting a policeman while rescuing two Irish republicans from jail |
| 8 | 9 | "The World Turned Upside Down" | 1:25 | 1647 | The title comes from a Diggers pamphlet |
| 9 | 10 | "Poverty Knock" | 3:14 | 1890s | Written by factory workers |
| 10 | 11 | "Idris Strike Song" | 2:49 | 1911 | Written in 1911 about a strike at the Idris soft drink factory in Wales; the Idris brand is now owned by Britvic |
| 11 | 12 | "Hanging on the Old Barbed Wire" | 2:02 | 1918 | Written by soldiers during World War I; refers to incompetent leaders sending legions of young to their deaths |
| 12 | - | "The Cutty Wren" | | 1381? | Reprise |
| - | 13 | "Coal Not Dole" | 2:00 | 1984 | Written by Kay Sutcliffe & Mat Fox about the UK miners' strike (1984–1985) |

According to the 1988 LP notes: "The words are sung, with a couple of exceptions, exactly how we found them written. To start chopping and changing them all to fit in with modern language and ideas would have destroyed the reason why we wanted to do them like this (Which isn't to say that folk music isn't to be changed, edited and modernised.) Consequently the language and meaning seem a bit peculiar at times."

From the 2003 re-release: "Now, fifteen years later, we felt we'd learned enough about our voices to try again, updating and rearranging the songs against a backdrop of US/British warmongering. The songs were discovered in songbooks and in folk clubs and on cassette tapes, chopped and changed and bludgeoned into shape with utmost respect for the original tunes."

== Personnel ==
=== 1988 recording ===
- Mavis Dillon
- Harry Hamer
- Cobie Laan
- Simon "Commonknowledge" Lanzon
- Danbert Nobacon
- Lou Watts
- Boff Whalley

Liner notes state that "Alice Nutter was otherwise engaged" and "[Dunstan Bruce] was reading football fanzines".

=== 2003 re-recording ===
- Jude Abbott
- Neil Ferguson
- Harry Hamer
- Simon "Commonknowledge" Lanzon
- Danbert Nobacon
- Lou Watts
- Boff Whalley
