= Portraits of Anarchists =

Portraits of Anarchists EP

EP by Chumbawamba
- Released: April 1, 1996
- Genre: Anarcho-punk
- Length: 17:00
- Label: One Little Indian (UK, 1996) in association with AK Press

Portraits of Anarchists is a limited edition 6-song EP by anarcho-punk band Chumbawamba which came attached to the front of the book i-Portraits of Anarchists by Casey Orr. It features exclusive songs not available elsewhere.

"Nothing Knocks Me Over" is a remake of the song "Love Can Knock You Over" from Swingin' with Raymond.

== Track listing ==
1. "Don't Tip-Toe" (3:26)
2. "Nothing Knocks Me Over" (3:05)
3. "I Can Only Take/Give So Much" (2:31)
4. "I Am Tradition & Tomorrow" (1:40)
5. "Time After Time" (3:11)
6. "You Grow Old" (3:24)
