= In Memoriam: Margaret Thatcher =

EP by Chumbawamba
- Released: April 8, 2013
- Recorded: c. 2005
- Genres: Folk, jazz, electronica
- Length: 10:27

Chumbawamba chronology
Going, Going – Live at Leeds City Varieties (2013)	In Memoriam: Margaret Thatcher (2013)

In Memoriam: Margaret Thatcher is an EP by British anarcho-punk band Chumbawamba, released on the death of UK Prime Minister Margaret Thatcher as a "segment of the celebrations".

== Recording and release ==
The EP was offered for pre-order at gigs from around 2005, and online from April 2009 when it was announced that it was "already recorded, pressed and ready to go". Copies were sent to purchasers on 8 April 2013, the day of death of former British prime minister Margaret Thatcher. The band had split up in 2012.

It was labelled on the album sleeve with "On the death of Lady Margaret Hilda Thatcher" and described by the band as "a small and perfectly-formed segment of the celebrations".

The band accompanied the release with a statement on their website:

This is a cause to celebrate, to party, to stamp the dirt down. Tomorrow we can carry on shouting and writing and working and singing and striking against the successive governments that have so clearly followed Thatcher’s Slash & Burn policies, none more so than the present lot. [...] If we must show a little reverence and decorum at this time, then so be it. Our deepest sympathies go out to the families of all Margaret Thatcher’s victims.

== Content ==
The album's full-length tracks are 1940s-inspired "So Long, So Long", and folky "Waiting for Margaret to Go". They are interspersed with shorter tracks, quotes, and samples including "Ding-Dong! The Witch Is Dead" from 1939's The Wizard of Oz.

Electronica-themed track The Day the Lady Died credits Czech electro band Midi Lidi, who later released an extended version on their own SoundCloud identifying it as a reworking of their track "Je toho hodně co říct" ("There's Much To Say").

Some of the album tracks had previously featured in the band's live set, including "So Long, So Long" in 2009 concerts (introduced with a request not to put it on YouTube until the EP's release) and "Pinochet Bids Farewell from Beyond the Grave" which was performed by band member Phil Moody during the band's final concert in 2012 and issued on the live DVD Going, Going – Live at Leeds City Varieties (under the title "Pinochet’s Love Song").

== Track listing ==
All tracks are written by Chumbawamba.

No.	Title	Thanks to	Length
1.	"Introduction"		0:23
2.	"So Long, So Long"		2:20
3.	"Pinochet Bids Farewell from Beyond the Grave"		0:50
4.	"The Day the Lady Died"	Midi Lidi	1:30
5.	"Ring the Bells!"		0:31
6.	"Waiting for Margaret to Go"		3:54
7.	"Sleep"		0:57
Total length:			10:27
