= Revengers Tragedy (album) =

Soundtrack album by Chumbawamba
- Released: 2003
- Recorded: 2003
- Genre: Electronic, ambient
- Length: 38:07
- Label: MUTT Records

Chumbawamba chronology
| English Rebel Songs 1381-1984 (2003) | Revengers Tragedy (2003) | Un (2004) |

Revengers Tragedy is a 2003 album by Chumbawamba which served as the soundtrack to the 2003 film adaptation of the 1606 play The Revenger's Tragedy.

== Track listing ==
All songs written and produced by Chumbawamba

1. Liverpool: Drive with Care - 5:13
2. He Did Assault My Brother! - 3:23
3. That Eternal Eye - 1:36
4. The Very Core of Lust - 2:17
5. Villain! Strumpet! Slapper! - 2:17
6. Blurred - 1:50
7. Lullaby Demons - 4:04
8. A Slavish Duke Is Baser Than His Slaves - 3:11
9. Sweet Angel of Revenge 5:06
10. Ambition - 5:42
11. Don't Try This at Home (Revengers Version) 3:28
