= Leeds City Varieties =

Music hall in Leeds, West Yorkshire, England

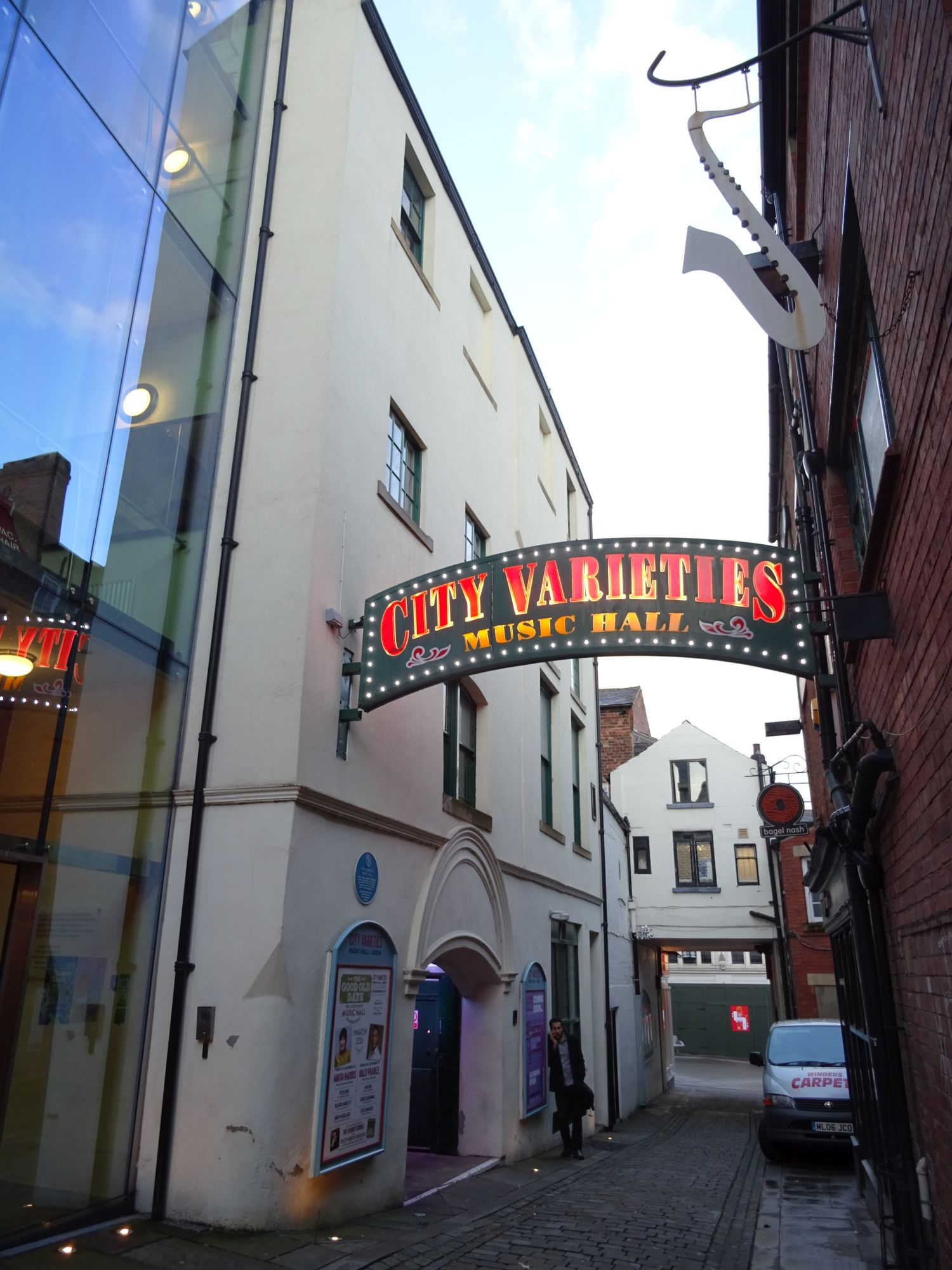
- The front entrance of Leeds City Varieties.
- Interactive map of Leeds City Varieties
- Location: Swan Street, Leeds, West Yorkshire, England
- Coordinates: 53.798889°N 1.542778°W
- Owner: Leeds Grand Theatre and Opera House Ltd.
- Capacity: 467
- Type: Music hall

Construction
- Opened: 1865
- Architect: George Smith

Website
- www.cityvarieties.co.uk

The Leeds City Varieties is a Grade II* listed music hall in Leeds, West Yorkshire, England.

== History ==
Leeds City Varieties was built in 1865 as an adjunct to the White Swan Inn in Swan Street by architect George Smith for Charles Thornton. Along with Hoxton Hall and Wilton's Music Hall (both in London), it is a rare surviving example of a Victorian era music hall. The interior is a long rectangle, with cast-iron columns with foliage capitals supporting two bow-fronted balconies, the upper tier of which received minor modifications in the 1880s. Plaster female busts, swags and medallions adorn the balconies, while a three-centred proscenium arch, surmounted by the royal coat of arms, covers the shallow stage.

The theatre was founded by local pub landlord and benefactor Charles Thornton and was originally called 'Thornton's New Music Hall and Fashionable Lounge'. This followed from a 'Singing Room' above the inn. The name subsequently changed to the White Swan Varieties and then Stansfield's Varieties before becoming the City Palace of Varieties. Charlie Chaplin, Marie Lloyd, Dan Leno, Vesta Tilley and Harry Houdini are among the artists who performed there.

Between 1953 and 1983, the theatre achieved national fame as the venue for the BBC television programme The Good Old Days, a recreation of old-time music hall featuring Leonard Sachs as the alliterative Chairman and many well-known and less-well-known performers. The venue still presents live "Good Old Days" music hall events over runs of 3 weekends in the spring and 4 in the autumn, as well as pantomime and a regular programme of stand-up comedy and music concerts.

The City Varieties was granted Heritage Lottery funds to help with major refurbishment and restoration. The theatre closed for refurbishment in January 2009, and re-opened in September 2011. The theatre now seats 467, and the sides of the balcony are closed to the public, now giving space to additional lighting.

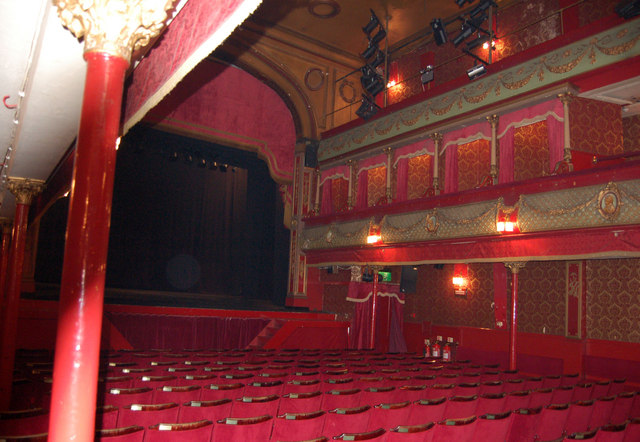
Interior of the City Varieties

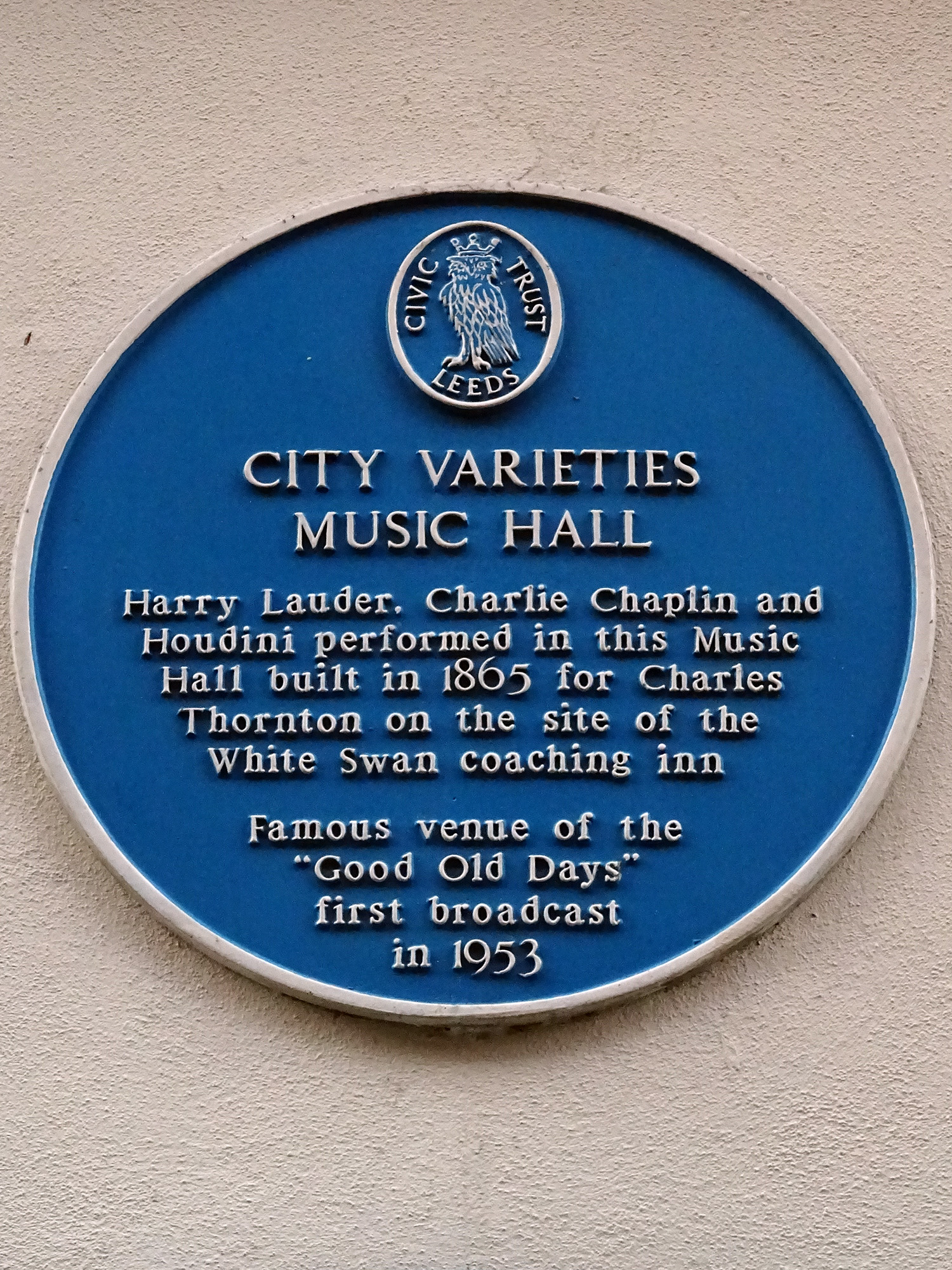
Blue plaque

== See also ==
- Grade II* listed buildings in Leeds
- Listed buildings in Leeds (City and Hunslet Ward - northern area)

== Bibliography ==
- Wrathmell, Susan (2008). Leeds. Yale University Press. ISBN 9780300107364.
