= Chumbawamba =

English alternative rock band (1982–2012)

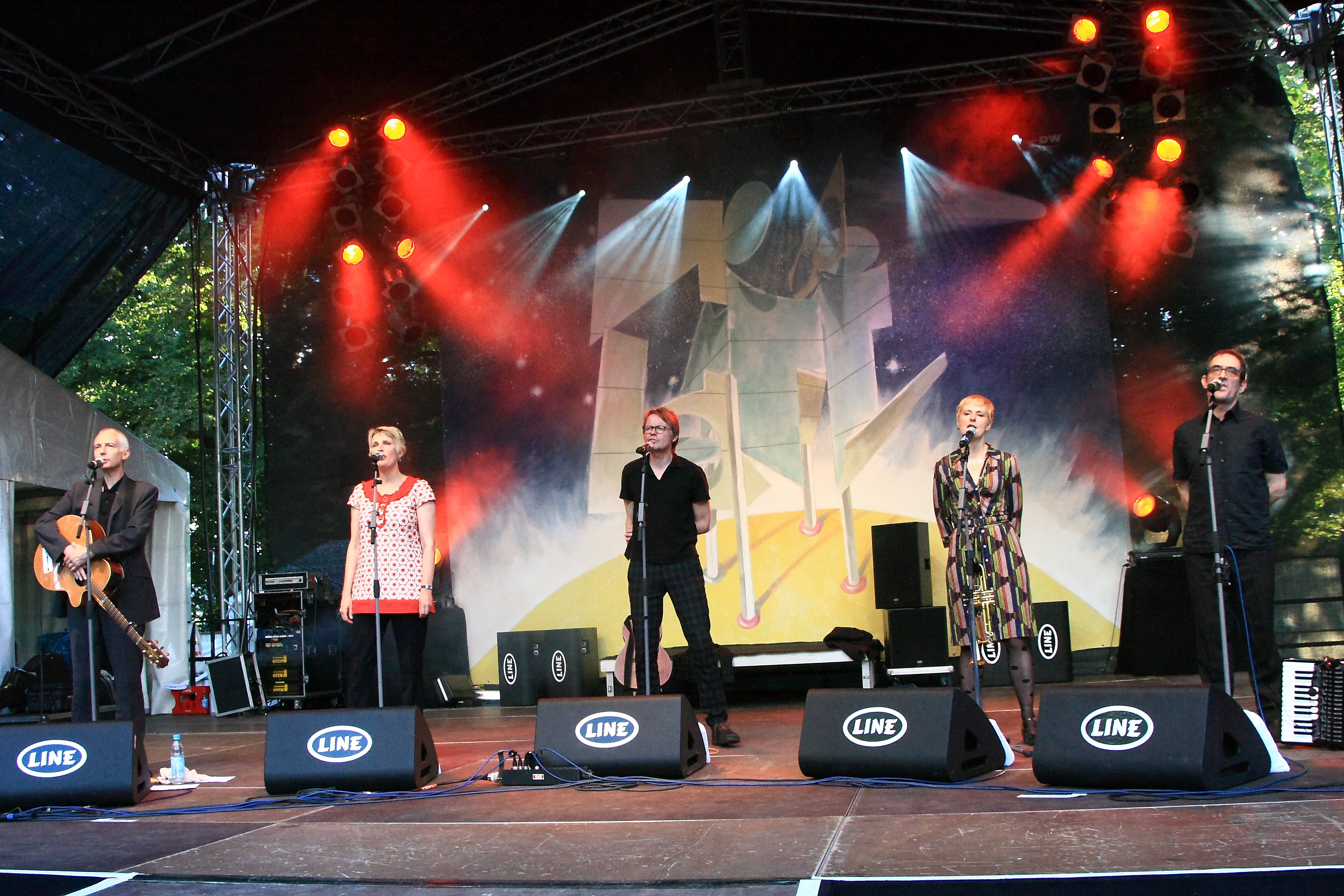
- Final lineup performing in July 2012

Background information
- Also known as: Skin Disease, Antidote (with the Ex), Scab Aid
- Origin: Burnley, Lancashire, and Leeds, West Yorkshire, England
- Genres: Anarcho-punk; alternative rock; pop; folk; alternative dance
- Years active: 1982–2012
- Labels: Agit-Prop; One Little Indian; EMI; MUTT/No Masters
- Past members: Boff Whalley; Danbert Nobacon; Midge; Lou Watts; Dunstan Bruce; Alice Nutter; Diane; Harry Hamer; Mavis Dillon; Cobie Laan; Jude Abbott; Paul Greco; Neil Ferguson; Phil Moody
- Website: chumba.com

Chumbawamba (/ˌtʃʌmbəˈwɒmbə/,/ˌtʃʌmbəˈwæmbə/) were an English band who formed in Burnley, Lancashire in 1982. They are best known for their 1997 single "Tubthumping", which was nominated for Best British Single at the Brit Awards 1998. Other singles include "Amnesia", "Enough Is Enough" (with Credit to the Nation), "Timebomb", "Top of the World (Olé, Olé, Olé)", and "Homophobia". Their anarcho-communist political leanings led them to have an irreverent attitude toward authority and to espouse a variety of political and social causes including animal rights and pacifism early in their career and later class struggle, Marxism, feminism, and anti-fascism.

For most of their career, the band had a seven to eight piece lineup and drew from a wide range of musical styles, including punk rock, pop, folk and dance. While their first two albums were largely punk and pop-influenced, their third was an entirely a cappella album of traditional songs. In 2004, several long-term members left, which continued with a four piece (later five piece) acoustic lineup, with more folk-influenced output.

In 2012, Chumbawamba announced they were splitting up after 30 years. A recording of their final show in November 2012 was released as a DVD.

== Name ==
The band's members have provided multiple mutually-exclusive explanations for the origin of the name "Chumbawamba", including Boff Whalley's story that it is a modification of the phrase "Chum, chum-ba, wailah!", which he heard chanted by an African drum band in Paris, and Danbert Nobacon's tale that it is inspired by a dream he had in which public toilets were not labeled "male" and "female", but "chumba" and "wamba". Jacobin suggested that "it was a running joke with band members who competed to see who could tell the most ridiculous story about where it came from".

Early interviews suggest that the band was initially called "Chumbawailing", and that they intended at one point to change the name for every gig.

A section on the band's former website asserted that the name was deliberately meaningless, as a reaction to the "obvious" names common among bands at the time they formed, and because it did not pin them to any particular associations and would not date.

== Band history ==
=== Early years (1982–1984) ===
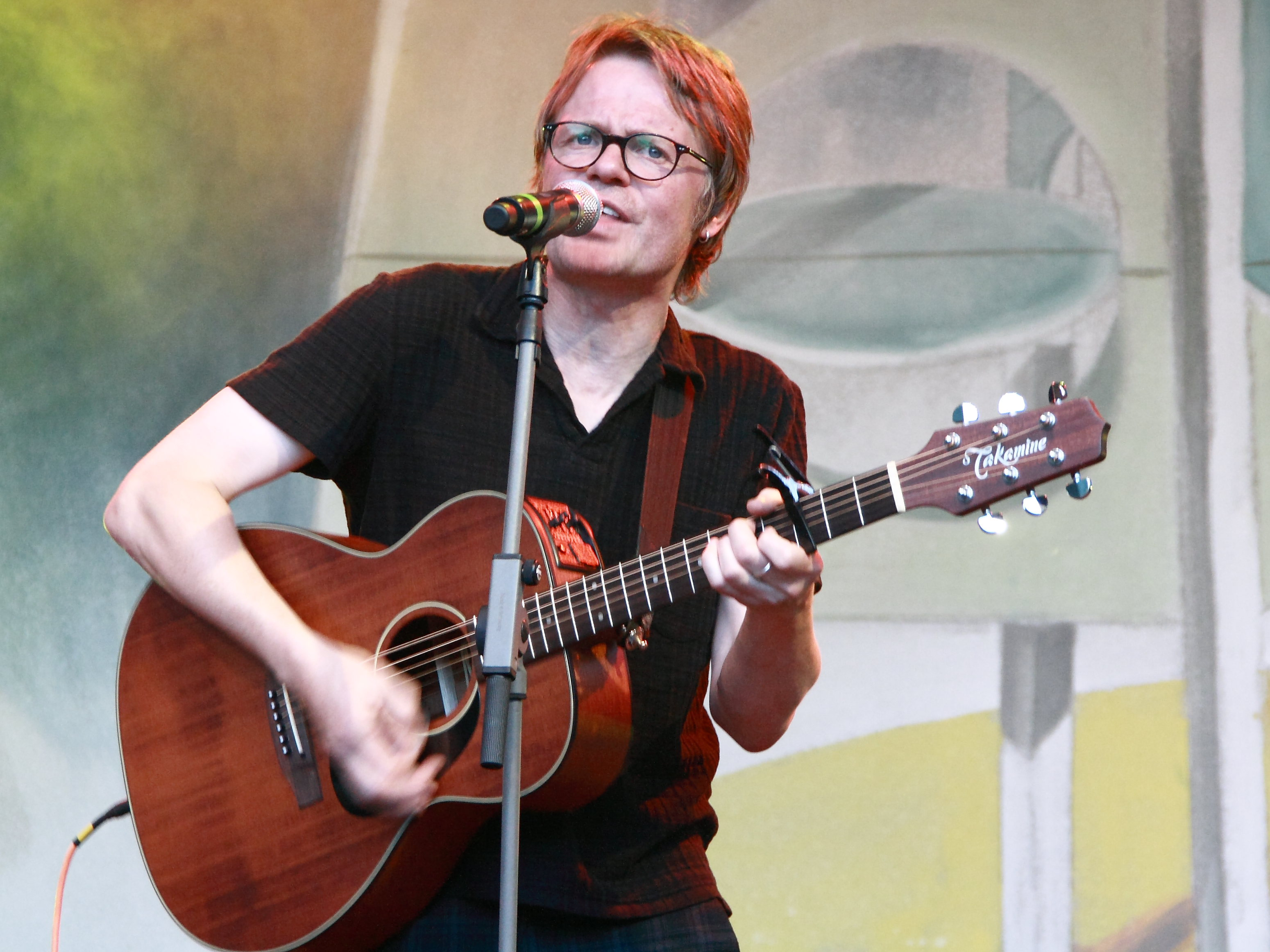
Founder member Boff Whalley performing in July 2012

Chumbawamba formed in Burnley in 1982 with an initial line-up of Allan "Boff" Whalley, Danbert Nobacon (born Nigel Hunter), and Midge – all previously members of the band Chimp Eats Banana – shortly afterwards joined by Lou Watts. The band made their live debut in January 1982. They were initially inspired musically by bands as diverse as the Fall, PiL, Wire, and Adam and the Ants and politically by the anarchist stance of Crass. Their first vinyl release was a track ("Three Years Later") on the Crass Records 1982 compilation album Bullshit Detector 2. Another early release was under the name "Skin Disease", parodying the Oi! bands of the time so successfully that they were included on Back On The Streets, an Oi! compilation EP put together by Sounds magazine journalist Garry Bushell.

In the early period of the band, all members lived together in a communal house, Southview House, on Carr Crofts, Armley, Leeds and kept all money in common.

By the end of 1982, the band had expanded to include Alice Nutter (of Ow My Hair's on Fire), and Dunstan "Dunst" Bruce (of Men in a Suitcase), who also moved into the Leeds house. Harry "Daz" Hamer and Mavis "Mave" Dillon (aka David Mills, Man Afraid) – members, along with Whalley, of Barnsley punk band Passion Killers – joined soon after. Simon "Commonknowledge" Lanzon, who had been a member of Donovan's band Open Road in the early 1970s, appeared on most of the band's early releases but was not usually listed as a band member. Another band member, Diane, appeared on early cassettes, but was asked to leave the communal house after conflict with other band members.

Stalwarts of the cassette culture scene, the band released a number of tapes on their own Sky and Trees Records, including in 1983 both Be Happy Despite It All – a split compilation with Passion Killers – and Be a Rebel, Raise some Heck, and in 1984 and Another Year of the Same Old Shit, and were featured on many compilations. Chumbawamba were at the forefront of the 1980s anarcho-punk movement, frequently playing benefit gigs in squats and small halls for causes such as animal rights, the anti-war movement, and community groups. The band's collective political views are often described as anarchism or anarcho-communist. They made several songs about the UK miners' strike, including the cassette Common Ground and a song dedicated to the pit village of Fitzwilliam, which was one of the worst cases of economic decline following the strike.

=== With Agit-Prop Records (1985–1992) ===
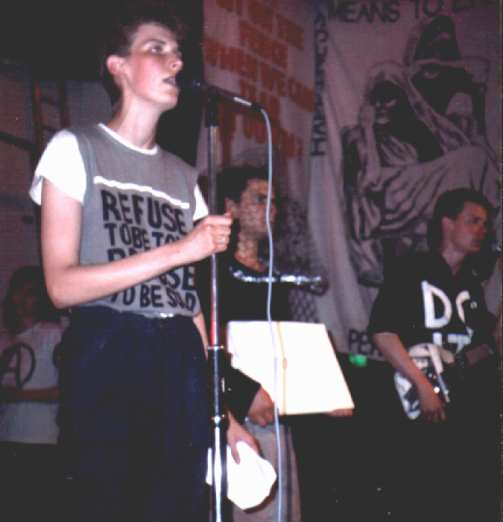
The band performing at Luton library in 1985

By the mid-1980s Chumbawamba had begun to release material using the vinyl format on their own Agit-Prop record label, which had evolved from an earlier project, Sky and Trees Records. The first release was the Revolution EP in 1985, which quickly sold out of its initial run, and was re-pressed, reaching No. 4 in the UK Indie Chart, and staying in the chart for 34 weeks. The first LP, Pictures of Starving Children Sell Records (1986), was a critique of the Live Aid concert organised by Bob Geldof, which the band argued was primarily a cosmetic spectacle designed to draw attention away from the real political causes of world hunger. During this period, as band members got jobs outside the band, they stopped sharing all money, and some members moved out of the communal house.

Chumbawamba toured Europe with Dutch band the Ex, and a collaboration between members of the two bands, under the name "Antidote", led to the release of an EP, Destroy Fascism!, inspired by hardcore punk band Heresy, with whom they had also toured. Both the Ex and Chumbawamba were released on cassette tape in Poland during this period, when music censorship was entrenched in Iron Curtain nations. The "RED" label, based in Wrocław in south-west Poland during the late 1980s, only released cassette tapes and, despite the limits enforced by Polish authorities, was able to release Chumbawamba's music, in addition to bands from the USSR, East Germany and Czechoslovakia. Cobie Laan, formerly sound engineer for The Ex, joined Chumbawamba as live sound engineer, and was also credited as a vocalist on 1988's English Rebel Songs 1381–1914.

Chumbawamba's second album, Never Mind the Ballots...Here's the Rest of Your Lives, was released in 1987, coinciding with the general election, and questions the validity of the British democratic system of the time. The band adopted another moniker, Scab Aid, (Note: Scab is a derogatory term for a worker who continues to work while others are on strike; a strikebreaker) for the "Let It Be" song release that parodied a version of the Beatles song recorded by the popstar supergroup Ferry Aid to raise money for victims of the Zeebrugge ferry disaster.

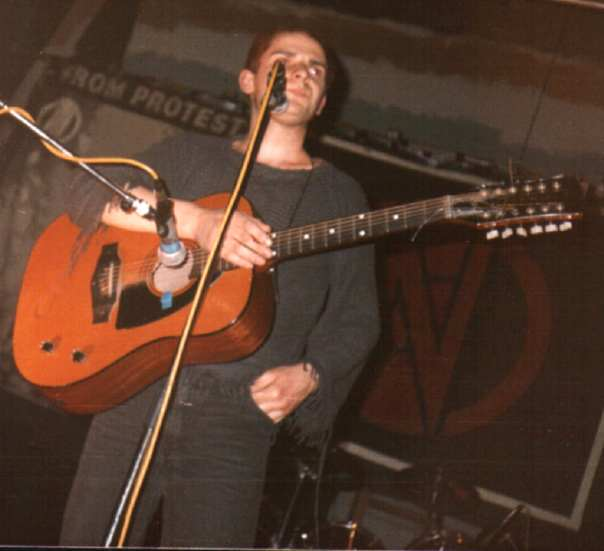
Vocalist Danbert Nobacon at the University of Birmingham, 1986, supporting Conflict

The 1988 album English Rebel Songs 1381–1914 was a recording of traditional songs.

By the late 1980s and early 1990s, Chumbawamba had begun to absorb influences from techno music and rave culture. The band members quit their day jobs to begin concentrating on music full-time as they could now guarantee sales of 10,000 and they moved away from their original anarcho-punk roots, evolving a pop sensibility with releases such as Slap! (1990) and the sample-heavy Shhh (1992) (originally intended to be released as Jesus H Christ!, this album had to be withdrawn and re-recorded because of copyright problems). They also toured the United States for the first time in 1990.

When Jason Donovan took The Face magazine to court that same year for claiming he was lying by denying he was gay, Chumbawamba responded by printing up hundreds of "Jason Donovan – Queer As Fuck" T-shirts and giving them away free with the single "Behave".

=== With One Little Indian Records (1993–1996) ===
After signing to the independent One Little Indian record label, Chumbawamba released "Enough Is Enough" in 1993 as a joint single with Credit to the Nation. This was their first entry in the UK singles chart, reaching number 56 – their highest chart ranking until "Tubthumping" four years later. The song also topped John Peel's Festive Fifty for 1993. They followed this up with "Timebomb" which hit 59 on the singles chart and 23 on the Festive Fifty. The band recorded sessions for John Peel's show in 1992 and 1993, in the first of which they only performed cover versions, opening with Black Lace's "Agadoo" (the original of which had been produced by Chumbawamba producer, and later member, Neil Ferguson).

Both singles featured on the band's sixth album, Anarchy (1994), with lyrics addressing issues such as homophobia, the Criminal Justice Act and the rise of fascism in the UK following the election of Derek Beackon, a British National Party councillor in south-east London in 1993. The album was the band's biggest success to date, reaching number 29 in the top 30. Third single "Homophobia" (featuring the Sisters of Perpetual Indulgence) also entered the low end of the UK Singles Chart. The live shows to support the album were recorded and went to make up their first live album Showbusiness!, released in 1995. One Little Indian also re-released Chumbawamba's back catalogue, which meant that the first three albums were released on CD for the first time, with the first two (Pictures of Starving Children Sell Records and Never Mind the Ballots) repackaged as one disc under the title First 2.

Chumbawamba parted with One Little Indian during the recording of the 1996 album Swingin' with Raymond, although they did release one last CD entitled Portraits of Anarchists, which came with copies of Casey Orr's book of the same name.

=== With EMI Records (1997–2001) ===
==== Controversy over EMI signing ====
Chumbawamba signed to EMI in Europe in 1997, a move that was viewed as controversial by many of their followers. They had been involved with a compilation LP called Fuck EMI in 1989, and had criticised the label in many of their earlier songs.

The anarcho-punk band Oi Polloi (with whom Chumbawamba had previously toured and worked with on the 'Punk Aid' Smash the Poll Tax EP) released an 'anti-Chumbawamba' split EP with Riot/Clone, Bus Station Loonies, Anxiety Society, The Chineapple Punks, Love Chips and Peas, and Wat Tyler, called Bare Faced Hypocrisy Sells Records (Ruptured Ambitions 1998).

Chumbawamba argued that EMI had severed the link with weapons manufacturer Thorn a few years previously, and that experience had taught them that, in a capitalist environment, almost every record company operates on capitalist principles: "Our previous record label One Little Indian didn't have the evil symbolic significance of EMI however they were completely motivated by profit." They added that this move brought with it the opportunity to make the band financially viable as well as to communicate their message to a wider audience.

==== Tubthumper – mainstream success and political controversy (1997–1999) ====
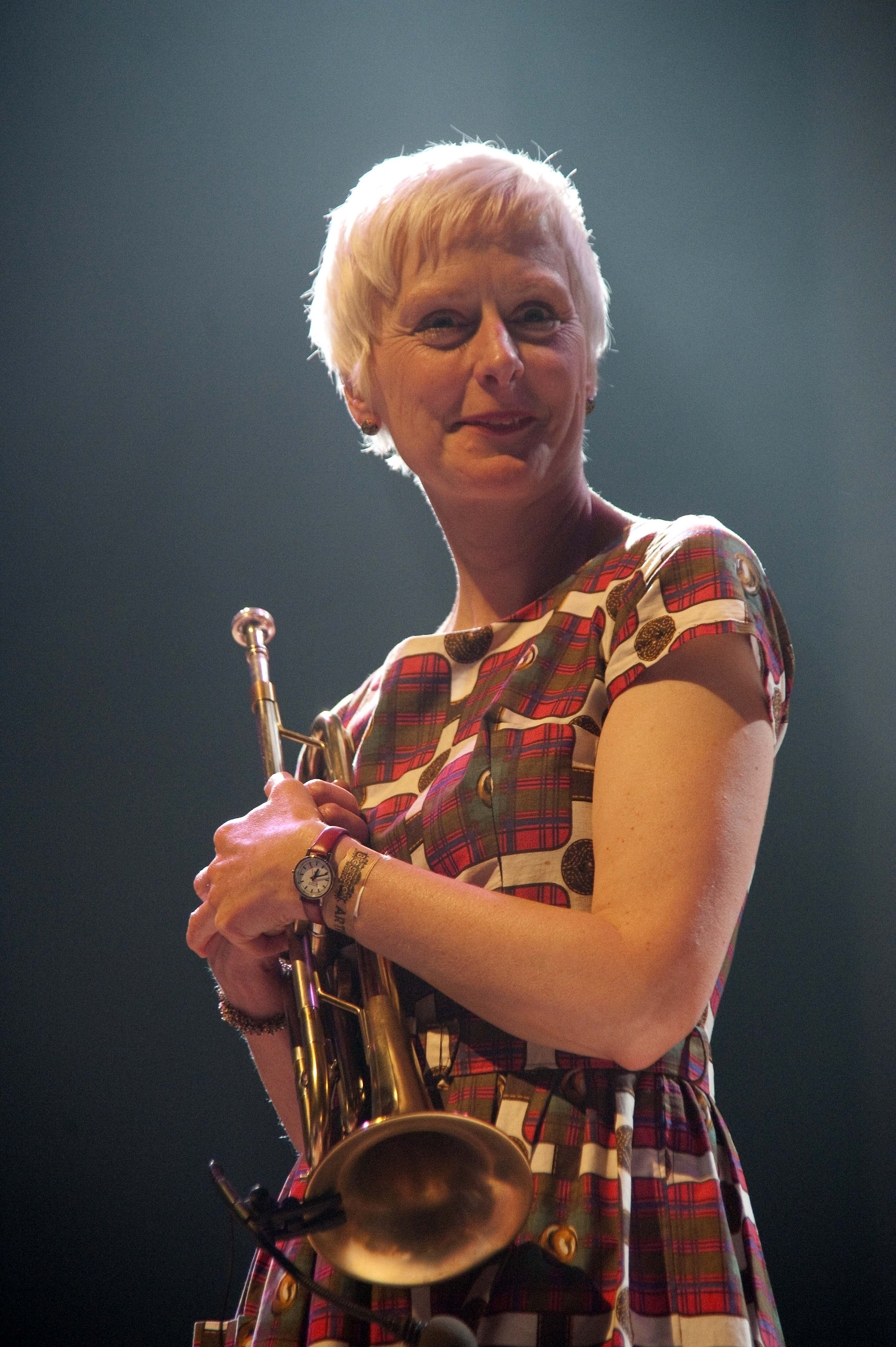
Jude Abbott joined the band in 1996 and would remain a member until the band's split in 2012

In 1997, Chumbawamba scored their biggest chart hit with "Tubthumping" (UK No. 2, US No. 6), which featured an audio sample of actor Pete Postlethwaite's performance in the film Brassed Off on the album version.

The single was followed by the album Tubthumper, which incorporated elements of pop rock, dance-pop, and alternative rock. The album was the first to feature Jude Abbott on trumpet, wind instruments and vocals, replacing Mavis Dillon.

In early 1998, "Amnesia" was released as the second single from the album, and reached No. 10 in the UK. During this period Chumbawamba gained some notoriety over several controversial incidents, starting in August 1997 when Nutter was quoted in the British music paper Melody Maker as saying, "Nothing can change the fact that we like it when cops get killed." The comment was met with outrage in Britain's tabloid press and was condemned by the Police Federation of England and Wales. The band resisted pressure from EMI to issue an apology and Nutter only clarified her comment by stating, "If you're working class they won't protect you. When you hear about them, it's in the context of them abusing people, y'know, miscarriages of justice. We don't have a party when cops die, you know we don't."

In January 1998, Nutter appeared on the American political talk show Politically Incorrect and advised fans of their music who could not afford to buy their CDs to steal them from large chains such as HMV and Virgin, which prompted Virgin to remove the album from the shelves and start selling it from behind the counter.

A few weeks later, provoked by the Labour government's refusal to support the Liverpool Dockworkers' Strike, the band performed "Tubthumping" at the 1998 BRIT Awards with the lyric changed to include "New Labour sold out the dockers, just like they'll sell out the rest of us", and vocalist Danbert Nobacon later poured a jug of water over UK Deputy Prime Minister John Prescott, who was in the audience.

In the late 1990s, the band turned down $1.5 million from Nike to use the song "Tubthumping" in a World Cup advertisement. According to the band, the decision took approximately "30 seconds" to make.

In the EA Sports football game World Cup 98, the song "Tubthumping" is one of the soundtrack titles.

In 2002, General Motors paid Chumbawamba either US$70,000 or US$100,000 to use the song "Pass It Along" from the WYSIWYG album for a Pontiac Vibe television advertisement. Chumbawamba gave the money to the anti-corporate activist groups Indymedia and CorpWatch, who used the money to launch an information and environmental campaign against GM.

EMI released the band's first collection album which featured a mixed bag of songs from between 1985 and 1998 under the title Uneasy Listening.

Also released in 1998 was a Japan-only mini album, Amnesia, consisting of country and western style versions of recent hits "Tubthumping" and "Amnesia" alongside earlier songs like "Mouthful of Shit".

In 1998, Chumbawamba also contributed to the album released by the Polish "Never Again" Association as a part of its Music Against Racism campaign. In 2021 the album was reissued as vinyl record One Race – Human Race. Music Against Racism: Part 2.

As a millennium present, Chumbawamba sent out a limited edition single to everyone on their mailing list. The song was a shoop-shoop-style ballad, "Tony Blair", which read like a heartbroken letter to an ex-lover who had broken all his promises. The band would send another free single out two years later, this time a re-worked version of the Beatles' song "Her Majesty" to coincide with the Queen's Golden Jubilee, with lyrics denouncing royalty.

==== WYSIWYG and leaving EMI (2000–2001) ====
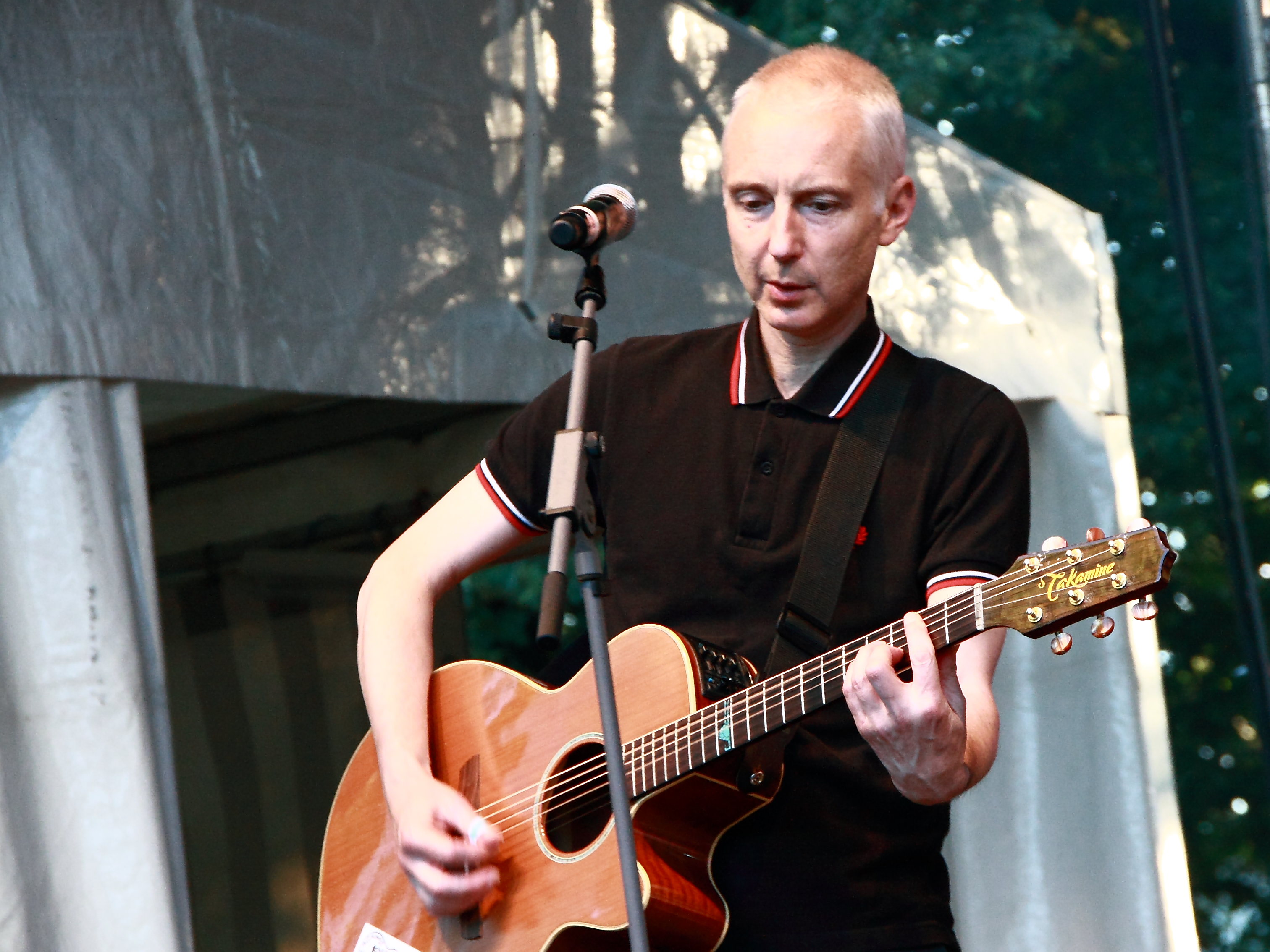
Neil Ferguson, who had engineered and produced the band's music since 1985, became a band member in 1999

Chumbawamba released the album WYSIWYG in 2000, which included a cover of the early Bee Gees song "New York Mining Disaster". The single "She's Got All The Friends That Money Can Buy" was backed by "Passenger List For Doomed Flight 1721", a song that listed all of the people that the band would like to see "disappear". The list of unfortunates included Tony Blair, Ally McBeal and Bono. Chumbawamba parted from EMI in 2001. The band later said that they got what they wanted from the deal with EMI: "we released some great records, we travelled all over the world, appeared on all these TV programmes, and we made loads of money, a lot of which we gave away or ploughed into worthwhile causes".

To celebrate their 20 years together, the band made a documentary film based on footage that they had recorded over the past two decades. Originally intended to be simply a compilation of their videos, the result was entitled Well Done, Now Sod off. The title was taken from an early review of a Chumbawamba record and the film included both lovers and haters of the band.

=== With Mutt Records (2002–2004) ===
Chumbawamba formed Mutt Records, their own record label, in 2002. It released their albums Readymades (2002), Revenger's Tragedy (2003 soundtrack), and Un (2004).

=== With No Masters Records (2005–2011) ===
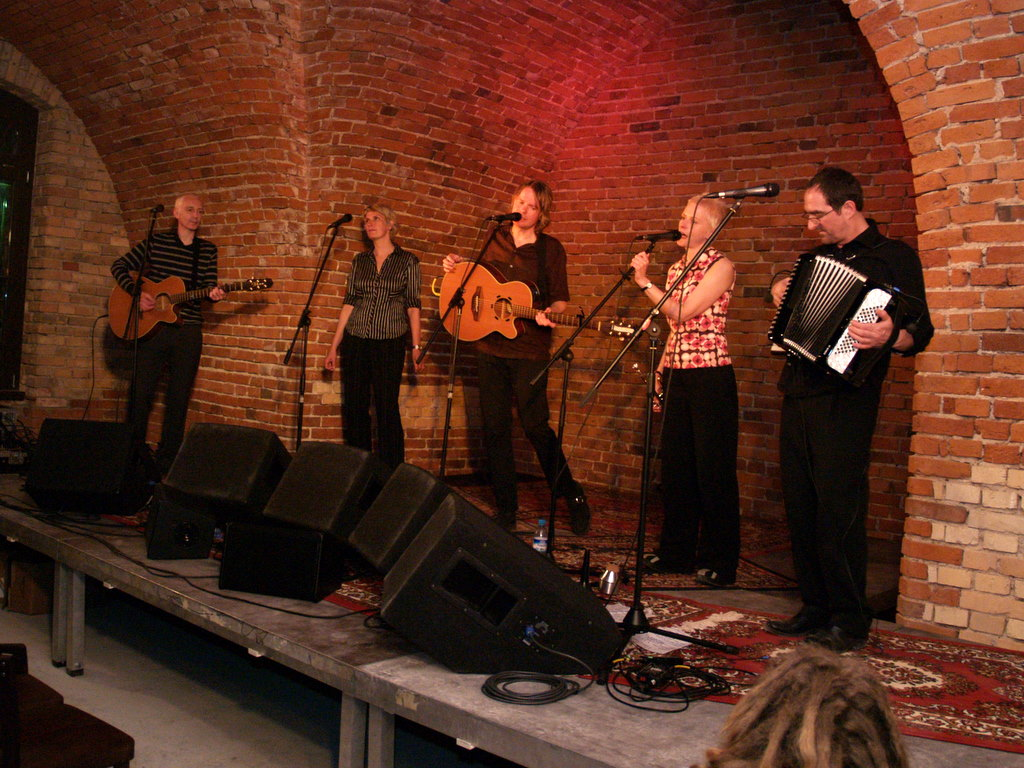
The final 5-person line-up of the band in 2007 (l-r Ferguson, Watts, Whalley, Abbott, Moody)

In 2005, Chumbawamba moved to a cut-down acoustic lineup. This saw the departure of long-time members Danbert Nobacon, Alice Nutter, Harry Hamer and Dunstan Bruce, leaving a 4-person lineup featuring founder members Lou Watts and Boff Whalley with later additions Jude Abbott and long-term producer Neil Ferguson.

No Masters Records released Chumbawamba's A Singsong and a Scrap in 2005.

In January 2007 it was announced that Chumbawamba would be playing at the Glastonbury Festival that year. That February, Nobacon and Bruce rejoined the band for a 25th anniversary gig at Leeds City Varieties. However, the band emphasised that this was a one-off appearance, and the cut-down acoustic lineup would form the basis for a new acoustic album to be recorded later that year.

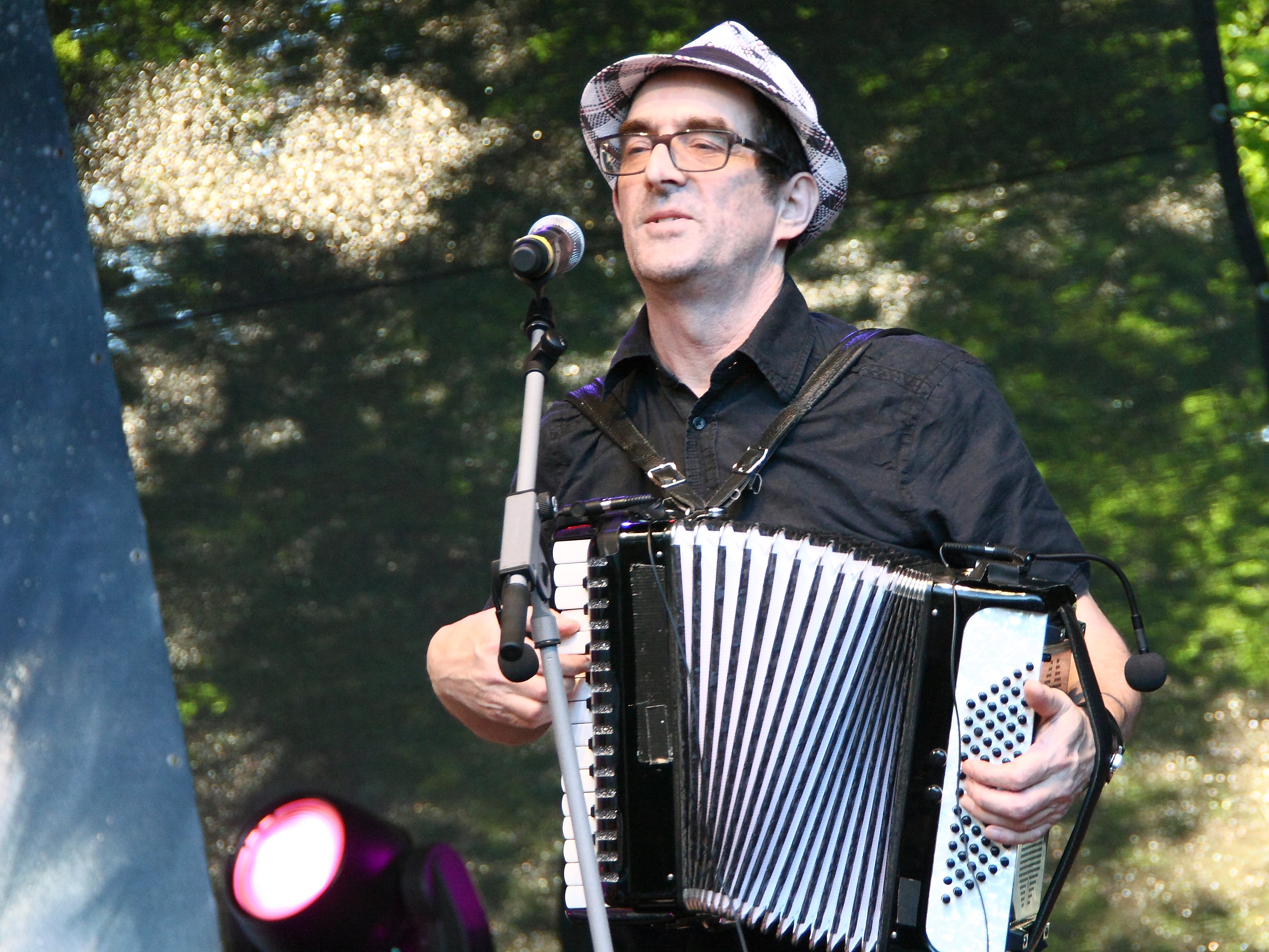
Phil Moody joined the band in 2007

The result was The Boy Bands Have Won, released on 3 March 2008 in the UK and 14 March in mainland Europe. The record contained 25 tracks, some of them full-length songs, some of them no more than a minute long and was again acoustic folk in style. The album is the debut of Phil Moody as a band member, and features the Oysterband, Roy Bailey and Barry Coope amongst others.

In late 2009 Chumbawamba toured northern England in their self-penned pantomime, a comedy musical entitled Riot, Rebellion & Bloody Insurrection with the Red Ladder Theatre Company. In late February 2010 they released their 15th album, titled ABCDEFG.

In September 2011, past and present band members protested when the UK Independence Party used "Tubthumping" at their annual conference.

=== Break-up and post-breakup activities (2012–present) ===
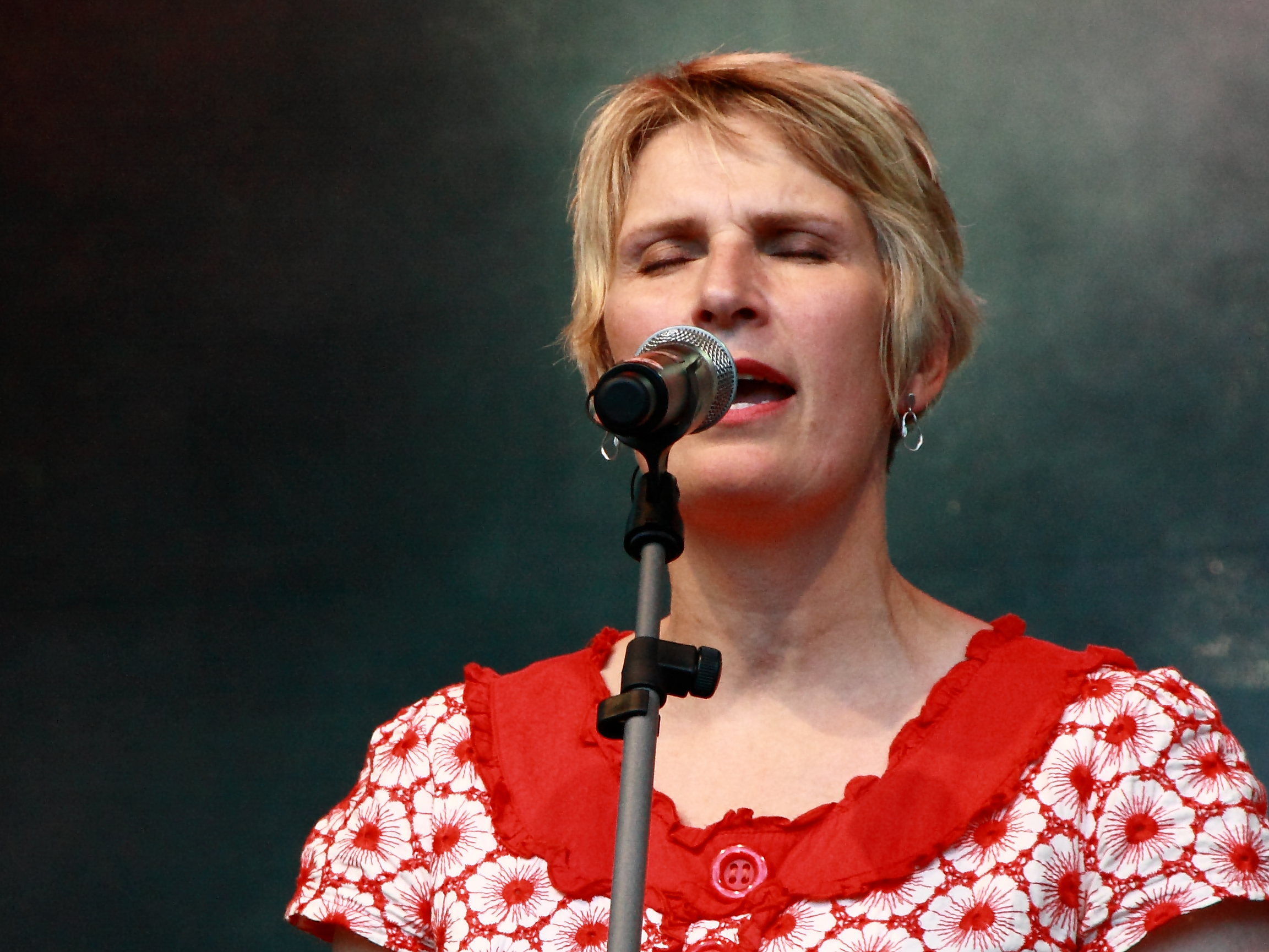
Lou Watts performing in July 2012

On 8 July 2012, Chumbawamba announced that they would be disbanding at the end of the year. On their website they opened the statement with "That's it then, it's the end. With neither a whimper, a bang or a reunion." They stated they would continue with individual efforts, and ended their official statement:

We do, of course, reserve the right to re-emerge as Chumbawamba doing something else entirely (certainly not touring and putting out albums every 2 or 3 years). But frankly, that's not very likely. Thirty years of being snotty, eclectic, funny, contrary and just plain weird. What a privilege, and what a good time we've had.

In December 2012, the final UK show, filmed at the Leeds City Varieties on Halloween night, was released as Chumbawamba's only live DVD, entitled Going, Going – Live at Leeds City Varieties.

A mail-order EP, In Memoriam: Margaret Thatcher, was released on 8 April 2013 to mark the death of the former UK Prime Minister. The CD had been recorded around 2005 and made available for pre-order at gigs and on the group's website, to be issued when Thatcher died.

==== Post-breakup band member activities ====
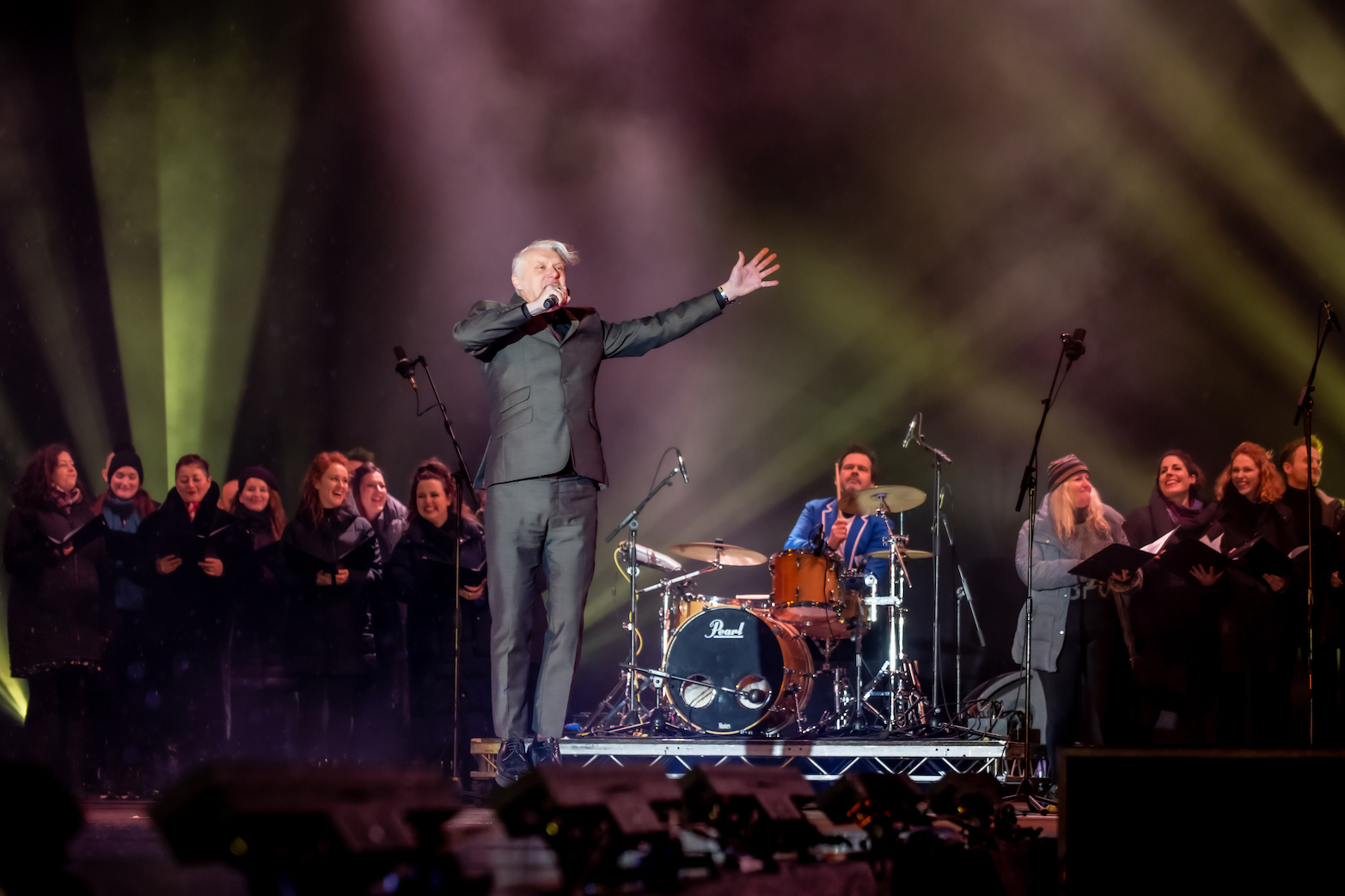
Dunstan Bruce performing "Tubthumping" with Opera North and Hope & Social for the launch of the Leeds 2023 year of culture

After leaving Chumbawamba, vocalist Dunstan Bruce founded Dandy Films, an independent film and video company whose projects have included a "video blog" of the Levellers' UK tour during 2010 and Sham 69's tour of China.

In 2012 former Chumbawamba members Dunstan Bruce and Harry Hamer formed a new band, Interrobang‽, with guitarist Stephen Griffin of London-based Regular Fries.

In August 2017, Dunstan Bruce, Boff Whalley and Jude Abbott were interviewed on BBC's The One Show from the Leeds City Varieties and near their former home celebrating 20 years since the release of "Tubthumping".

Chumbawamba were a member of the Canadian charity Artists Against Racism and participated in a 2018 Radio PSA for them.

Former member Alice Nutter has had a number of plays performed at the Leeds Playhouse, where she took a writing course in 2006. A neon sculpture on the side of the theatre features the lyric "I get knocked down but I get up again" from the band's single "Tubthumping".

In 2025, Rebellion Festival announced that band members Dunstan Bruce, Mavis Dillon, Lou Watts, Harry Hamer, Boff Whalley, Alice Nutter and Danbert Nobacon would appear on an "in conversation" panel at their 2025 event, which would also feature the first performances since 1984 of pre-Chumbawamba band Passion Killers (Dillon, Whalley and Hamer).

==== Documentary ====
On 1 July 2015 Dunstan Bruce started a Kickstarter to fund a documentary titled I Get Knocked Down (The Untold Story of Chumbawamba) that told the band's entire history from different members' perspective. He surpassed his £40,000 goal. That same year, Chumbawamba was the featured subject on two podcasts produced by Gimlet Media: StartUp #16 "The Secret Formula" and Surprisingly Awesome #4 "Tubthumping".

== Musical style and legacy ==
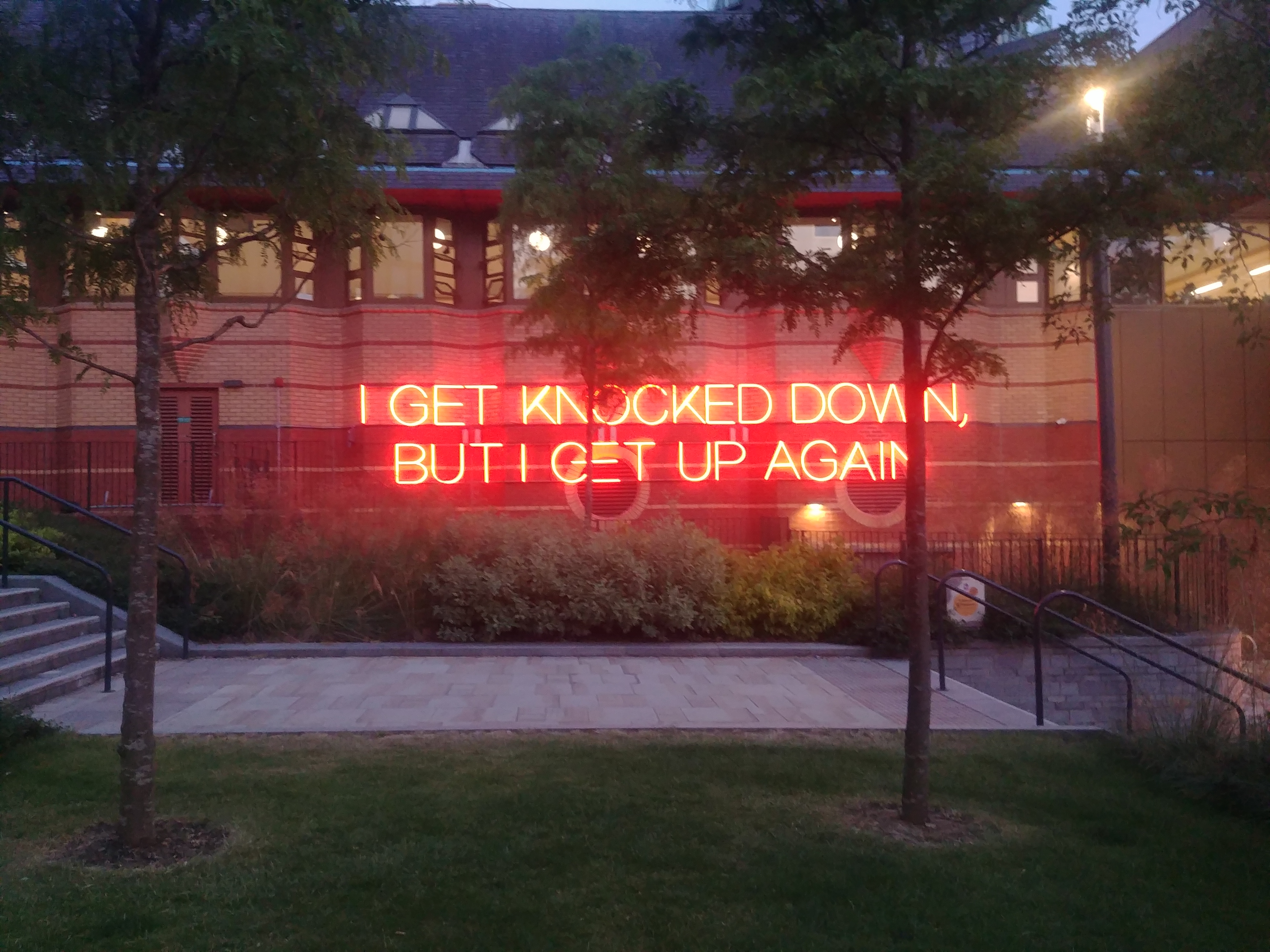
A neon sculpture on the Leeds Playhouse featuring the lyric "I get knocked down but I get up again" from the song "Tubthumping".

Chumbawamba has been described as various genres including anarcho-punk, pop, folk, world, dance, alternative rock pop rock, electronic, rock, and a cappella.

In an interview with The Guardian in 2016, the band was cited along with a number of other British anarcho-punk bands of the early 80s as being an influence to the American avant-garde metal group Neurosis.

=== Use of "Tubthumping" by the right ===
Boff Whalley has written that in the early days of his 2016 presidential campaign, Donald Trump had used "Tubthumping" in his rallies; the group denied him the right to do so. Whalley said that "There have been many, many examples of rightwing populist leaders using ostensibly leftwing music to hoodwink their audiences into some kind of hypnotic self-delusion that they are 'of the people'."

Relatedly, in 2024, Chumbawamba made headlines in New Zealand, when Deputy Prime Minister Winston Peters used "Tubthumping" throughout his election campaign and during his state of the nation speech. Peters argued against addressing Māori inequality, gender and sexuality lessons in the school curriculum and compared co-governance (shared decision-making between Māori and the Crown) to the race-based theories of Nazi Germany. Chumbawamba spoke out, stating they had not given permission to use their song. In March 2024, the band issued a "cease and desist" order against Peters.

In a statement, Boff Whalley said, "Tubthumping" was written "as a song of hope and positivity, so it seems entirely odd that the 'I get knocked down...' refrain is being used by New Zealand's deputy prime minister Winston Peters as he barks his divisive, small-minded, bigoted policies during his recent speeches".

== Members ==
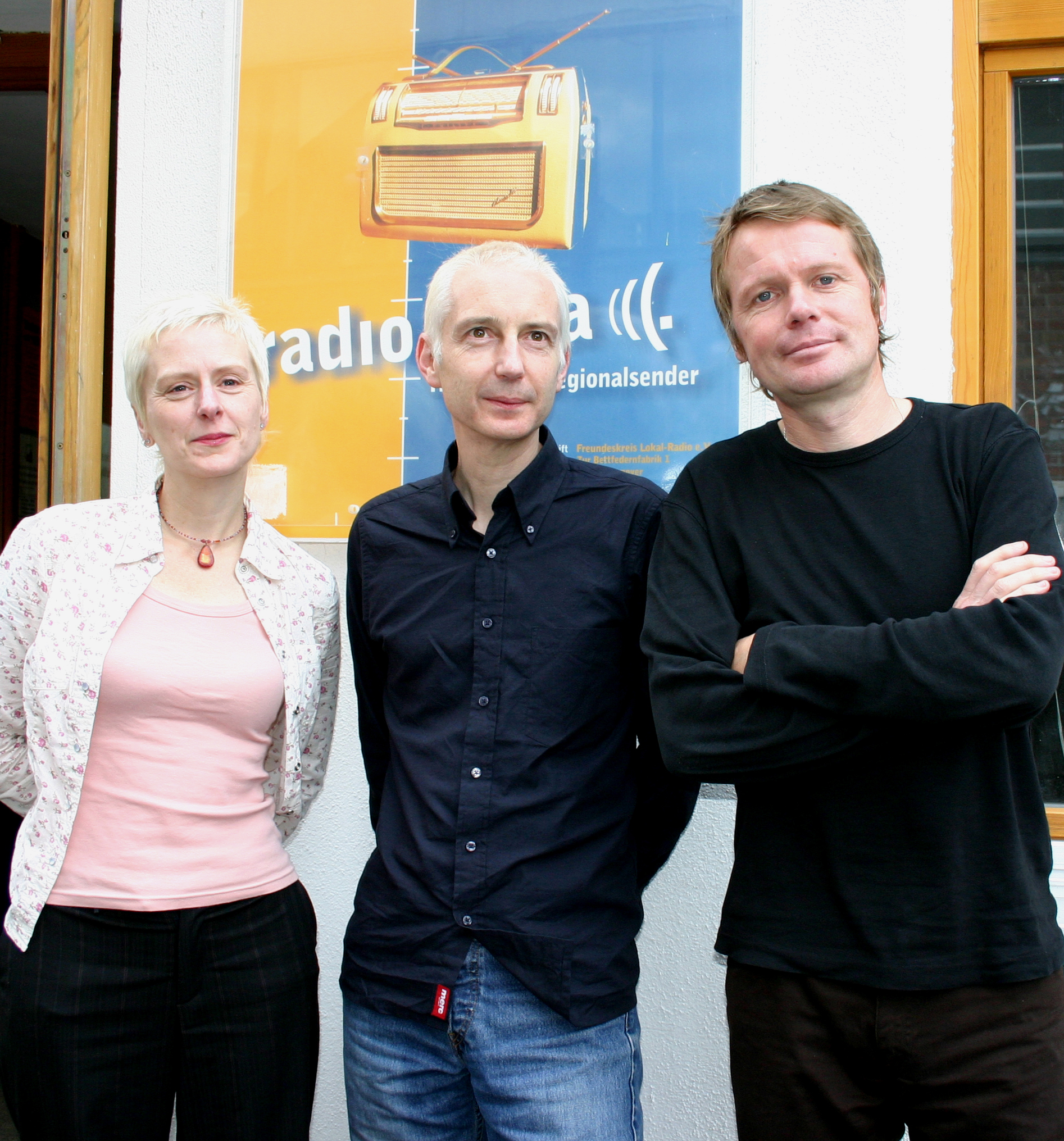
Abbott, Ferguson and Whalley in 2005

The band's membership varied over the years, with the line-up and musical assignments in the early years being especially fluid (members were known to switch instruments between, or even during, gigs). This is a list of principal official members and collaborators, drawn mainly from the credits of their releases since 1985. Short-term members and significant collaborators appear in the second list.

=== Former members ===
- Boff Whalley – vocals, guitar, clarinet (1982–2012)
- Danbert Nobacon – vocals, percussion, guitar, banjo, ukulele, keyboards (1982–2004, 2007, 2012)
- Midge – drums (1982-1985)
- Lou Watts – vocals, keyboards, guitar (1982–2012)
- Dunstan Bruce – vocals, percussion, bass, guitar, turntables, saxophone (1982–2004, 2007, 2012)
- Alice Nutter – vocals, percussion (1982–2004, 2012)
- Diane – (1982-1984)
- Harry Hamer – drums, percussion, guitar, programming, vocals (1983–2004, 2008, 2010, 2012)
- Mavis Dillon – vocals, trumpet, guitar, bass, drums, French horn (1984–1995)
- Cobie Laan (or Coby, formerly of The Ex) – vocals, live recording (1988-1991)
- Paul Greco – bass, harmonica (1992–1999, 2012)
- Jude Abbott – vocals, trumpet, recorder, flute, flugelhorn (1996–2012)
- Neil Ferguson – vocals, guitar, bass, keyboards (producer and studio musician 1985–1999, member 1999–2012)
- Phil Moody – accordion, vocals (2007–2012)

=== Occasional members and guests ===
- Simon "Commonknowledge" Lanzon (formerly of Open Road) – vocals, keyboards, piano, accordion (appeared on most releases, occasionally listed as a member, 1983-1995, plus on English Rebel Songs 1381–1984; died 2012)
- MC Fusion (of Credit to the Nation) – vocals (Shhh and Anarchy)
- Jimmy Echo (Harry Hamer's father, a professional club singer) – vocals ("Timebomb" on Showbusiness! and "Amnesia" single B-side)
- B. J. Cole – slide guitar (WYSIWYG)
- Coope, Boyes & Simpson – vocals (A Singsong and a Scrap, Get On With It! and The Boy Bands Have Won, plus Coope alone on Going, Going)
- The Charlie Cake Marching Band – brass (The Boy Bands Have Won and ABCDEFG)
- Members of Oysterband - vocals and various instruments ("Farewell to the Crown", A Singsong and a Scrap, The Boy Bands Have Won and ABCDEFG)
- Roy Bailey – guest lead vocals ("Word Bomber" on The Boy Bands Have Won and Going, Going; died 2018)
- Robb Johnson – guest lead vocals ("A Fine Career" on The Boy Bands Have Won)
- Jo Freya – saxes (The Boy Bands Have Won and ABCDEFG)
- Belinda O'Hooley – piano (ABCDEFG and Going, Going)
- Michelle Plum – vocals ("Sewing Up Crap" on Readymades) and live vocals/keyboards (2001-2004)
- Winkie Thin - accordion (A Singsong and a Scrap)

== Discography ==
- Pictures of Starving Children Sell Records (1986)
- Never Mind the Ballots (1987)
- English Rebel Songs 1381–1914 (1988)
- Slap! (1990)
- Shhh (1992)
- Anarchy (1994)
- Swingin' with Raymond (1995)
- Tubthumper (1997)
- WYSIWYG (2000)
- Readymades (2002)
- Revengers Tragedy Soundtrack (2003)
- English Rebel Songs 1381–1984 (2003)
- Un (2004)
- A Singsong and a Scrap (2005)
- The Boy Bands Have Won (2008)
- ABCDEFG (2010)

== Awards and nominations ==
Year	Awards	Work	Category	Result	Ref.
1997	Denmark GAFFA Awards	Chumbawamba	Foreign New Act	Nominated	
1997	Žebřík Music Awards	"Tubthumping"	Best International Song	Nominated	
1998	Tokio Hot 100 Awards	Chumbawamba	Best Character	Won	
1998	Hungarian Music Awards	Tubthumper	Album of the Year	Won	
1998	MTV Video Music Awards	"Tubthumping"	Best New Artist	Nominated	
1998	Brit Awards	"Tubthumping"	Best British Single	Nominated	
1999	BMI Pop Awards	"Tubthumping"	College Song of the Year	Won	
1999	BMI Pop Awards	"Tubthumping"	Award-Winning Song	Won	
2010	UK Festival Awards	Big Session Festival	Critics' Choice Award	Nominated	

== See also ==
- Anarchism and the arts
- Bill Smith (fell runner) for "Stud Marks on the Summit" by Chumbawamba
- Punk ideology
- Animal rights and punk subculture
