= Alice Nutter (writer) =

English musician and writer (born 1962)

- Born: 10 July 1962 (age 64); Burnley, Lancashire, England
- Occupations: Musician; screenwriter
- Musical career
- Genres: Alternative rock; anarcho-punk; pop; folk; pop rock
- Instruments: Vocals; percussion
- Years active: 1982–2004
- Labels: Agit-Prop; One Little Indian; EMI; MUTT Records/No Masters

Alice Nutter (born Anne Holden; 10 July 1962) is an English retired musician, best known as part of the anarchist music group Chumbawamba, and writer for theatre, radio and television.

== Early life ==
She was born in Burnley, Lancashire, and attended Towneley High School.

== Musical career ==
Nutter joined Chumbawamba in 1982, not long after the band formed, and took up residence in their squat in Armley. With her music and politics closely integrated, Nutter picketed during the 1984-85 miners' strike and the 1986 Wapping dispute. In 1997, the band had an international hit with their song "Tubthumping", on which Nutter was a vocalist. She performed with the band on numerous international television shows and at the 1998 BRIT Awards. Nutter left Chumbawamba in 2006 to start a new career as a playwright. In 2012, she returned to the band for their final live performance at the Leeds City Varieties, recorded on the live DVD Going, Going – Live at Leeds City Varieties.

== Writing career ==
Her theatre work includes Foxes (2006) at the West Yorkshire Playhouse and Where's Vietnam? (2008) for Red Ladder Theatre Company at West Yorkshire Playhouse. Her radio work includes the afternoon play Snow In July (2008) for Radio 4 and the play My Generation (2012) for Radio 3. In 2013, My Generation was brought to the West Yorkshire Playhouse by its artistic director James Brining in the first full-scale, main-stage production of Nutter's work. In 2016, the West Yorkshire Playhouse in Leeds staged Nutter's play the Barnbow Canaries about women munition workers in Barnbow, Leeds, during the First World War. The factory the women were working in exploded one day in December 1915 and killed 35 and injured many more.

For television, Nutter has written an episode of Jimmy McGovern's series The Street (2007) and an episode of the BBC medical drama Casualty (2009). She has also written an episode of Moving On, Jimmy McGovern's series, Accused and period drama The Mill. Nutter wrote a biographical drama based on the life of the Mancunian comedian Bernard Manning, but cuts to the BBC4 budget led to the piece never being filmed.

In March 2014, Spanner Films announced that Nutter would be one of the writers for Undercovers, a television drama series about the undercover police officers who infiltrated the British activist scene for 50 years, and the women who unknowingly had long-term relationships and even children with the spies. The series was also written by Simon Beaufoy, and was to be produced by Tony Garnett. The project did not come to fruition, but she later worked on the FX series Trust with Beaufoy about the Getty family and the kidnapping of John Paul Getty III, broadcast on BBC2 in 2018. With Beaufoy, she wrote the sequel television series to the 1997 film The Full Monty, produced by FX on Hulu and Disney+.

== Personal life ==
She changed her name by deed poll, feeling "an affinity" to the woman accused and hanged as a result of the 17th-century Pendle witch hunt.

Nutter is an atheist.

== Writing credits ==
| Production | Notes | Broadcaster |
|---|---|---|
| The Street | "The Postman" (2007) | BBC One |
| Casualty | "With This Ring" (co-written with Martin Jameson, 2009) | BBC One |
| Moving On | "The Test" (2010) | BBC One |
| Accused | "Helen's Story" (2010) | BBC One |
| 32 Brinkburn Street | "Episode #1.3" (2011); "Episode #1.4" (2011) | BBC One |
| Justice | "The Secret's Out" (2011) | BBC One |
| The Mill | "Episode #2.4" (2014) | Channel 4 |
| The White Princess | "English Blood on English Soil " (2017) | Starz |
| Trust | "Episode #5" (2018); "Episode #8" (2018); "Episode #9" (2018); "Episode #10" (2018) | FX |
| The Full Monty | Series co-creator and co-writer (2023) | FX |

== Awards, honours, and nominations ==
| Year | Award | Work | Category | Result | Reference |
|---|---|---|---|---|---|
| 2011 | Writers' Guild of Great Britain Award | Accused | Best Television Drama Series (with Jimmy McGovern, Daniel Brocklehurst and Esther Wilson) | Nominated | |

Nutter's name is one of those featured on the sculpture Ribbons, unveiled in 2024.
