= Dunstan Bruce =

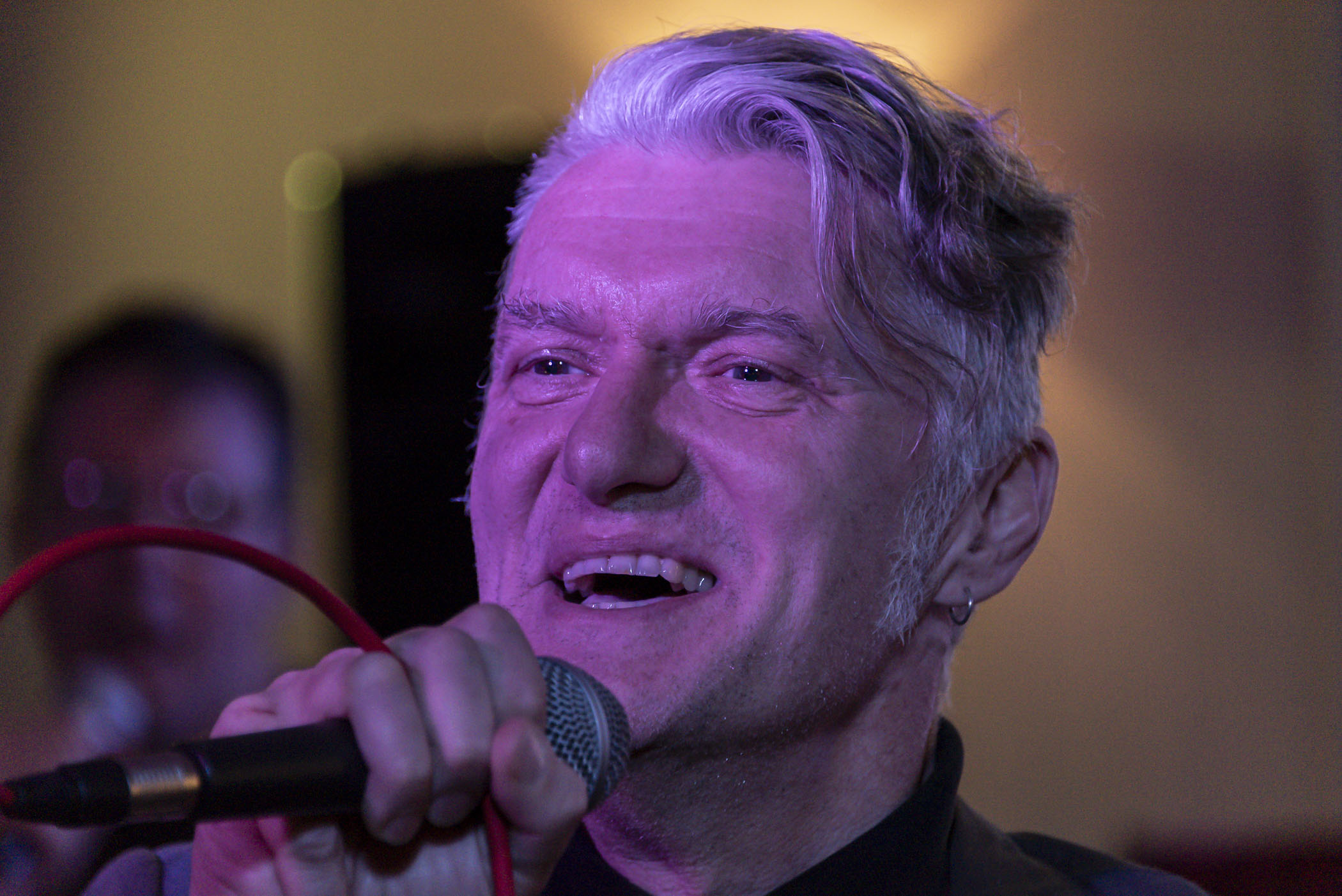
- Dunstan Bruce performing in London in 2017

Background information
- Born: 31 December 1960 (age 65)
- Genres: Anarcho-punk; post-punk
- Occupations: Singer; musician; filmmaker
- Instruments: Vocals; percussion; bass; guitar; turntables; saxophone
- Years active: 1982–present

Dunstan Bruce (31 December 1960) is a British musician and filmmaker. He was a founding member of the anarcho-punk band Chumbawamba.

== Career ==
=== Musician ===
Bruce joined Chumbawamba when it formed in 1982. He is lead singer on the band's biggest hit single, "Tubthumping" (1997). Bruce left Chumbawamba at the end of 2004.

Bruce is the lead singer of Interrobang‽, an agitprop post-punk band he formed in 2012 with ex-Chumbawamba drummer Harry Hamer and ex-Regular Fries guitarist Stephen Griffin. They released a critically-acclaimed eponymous album in 2018.

Bruce performed a spoken-word piece accompanied by music as the Existential Angst of Dunstan Bruce.

=== Filmmaker ===
Bruce has a film production company. He collaborated on Channel 4's Whatever: A Teenage Musical, and worked on several documentary films: Well Done. Now Sod Off. (2000) during his time in Chumbawamba, I Get Knocked Down (2021) about his experience in Chumbawamba, A Curious Life about the folk rock band Levellers, and This Band Is So Gorgeous!: Sham 69 in China about the punk band Sham 69. It was nominated for "Best Music Documentary" at the 2012 International Documentary Film Festival Amsterdam.

In 2022, his one-man show Am I Invisible Yet? played in New Milton.
