= Ekwall =

Ekwall is a surname. Notable people with the surname include:

- Eilert Ekwall (1877–1964), Swedish Professor of English at Lund University
- Emma Ekwall (1838–1925), Swedish painter
- Harald Ekwall (1873–unknown), Chilean sports shooter
- Knut Ekwall (1843–1912), Swedish painter and illustrator
- Patrick Ekwall (born 1965), Swedish sports journalist
- Sofia Maria Ekwall (1826–1897), Swedish female murderer
- William A. Ekwall (1887–1956), United States Representative from Oregon and a Judge of the United States Customs Court
