= Harehills =

Area of Leeds, West Yorkshire, England

Coordinates: 53.8066°N 1.5053°W

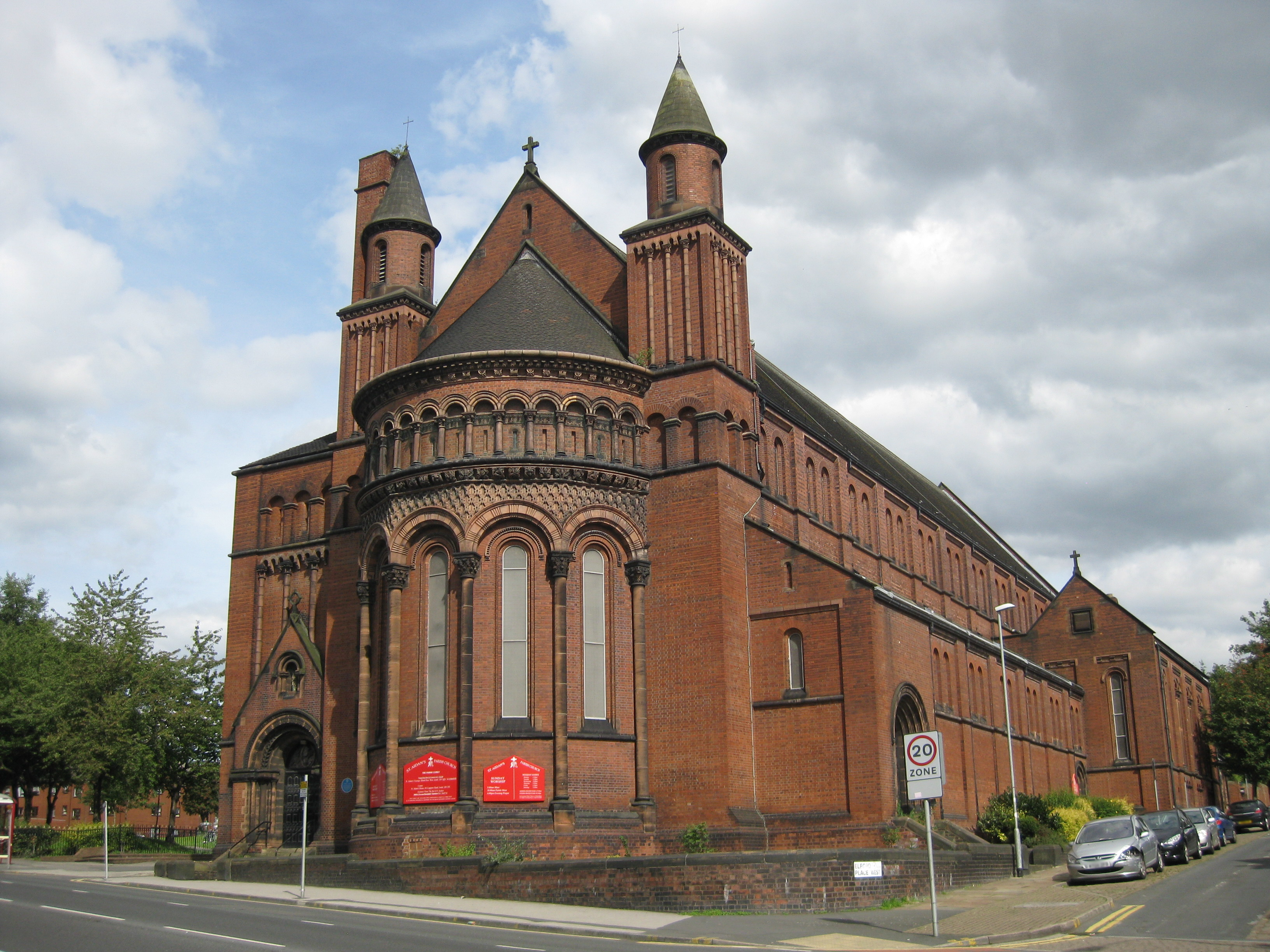
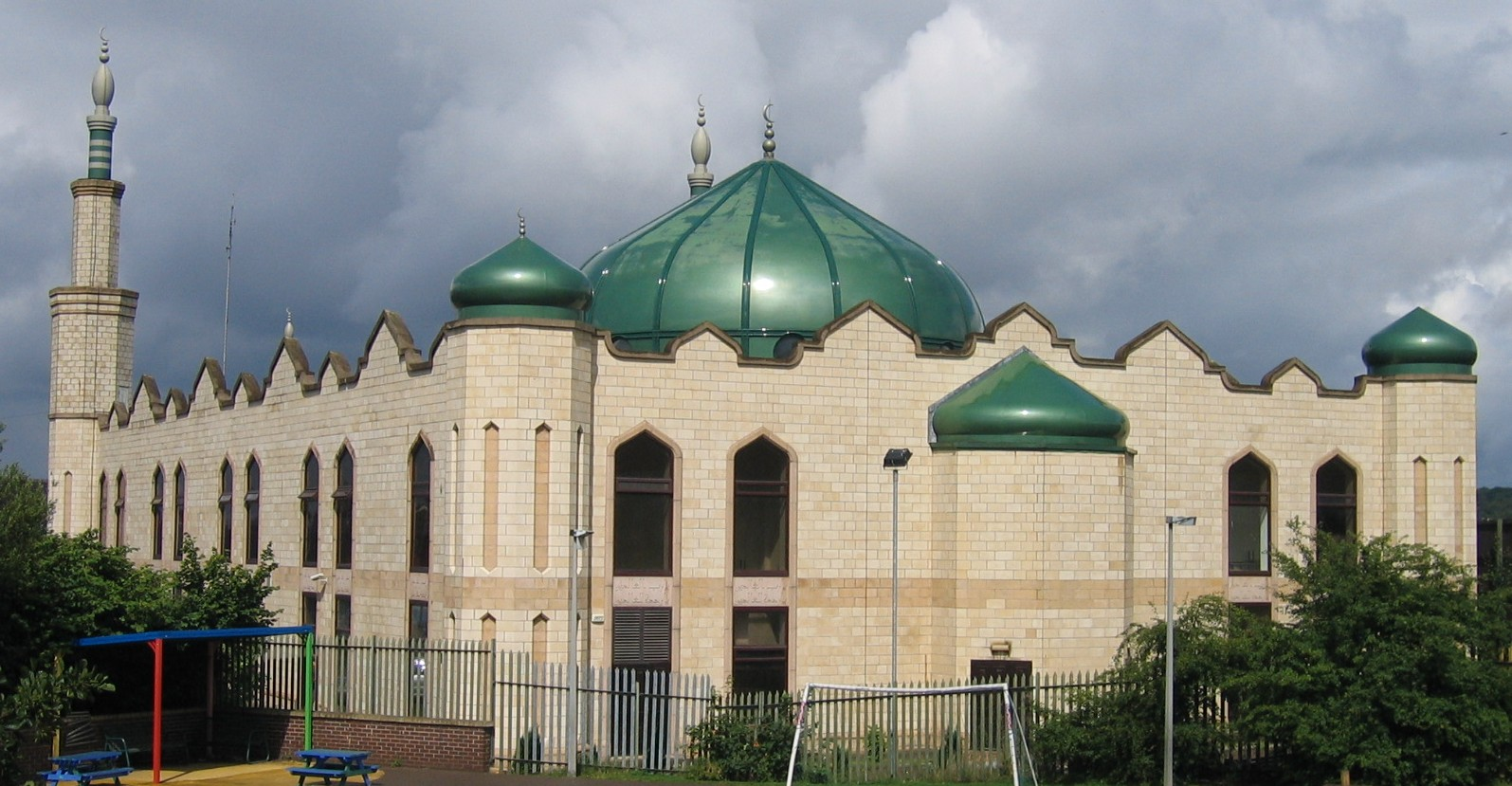
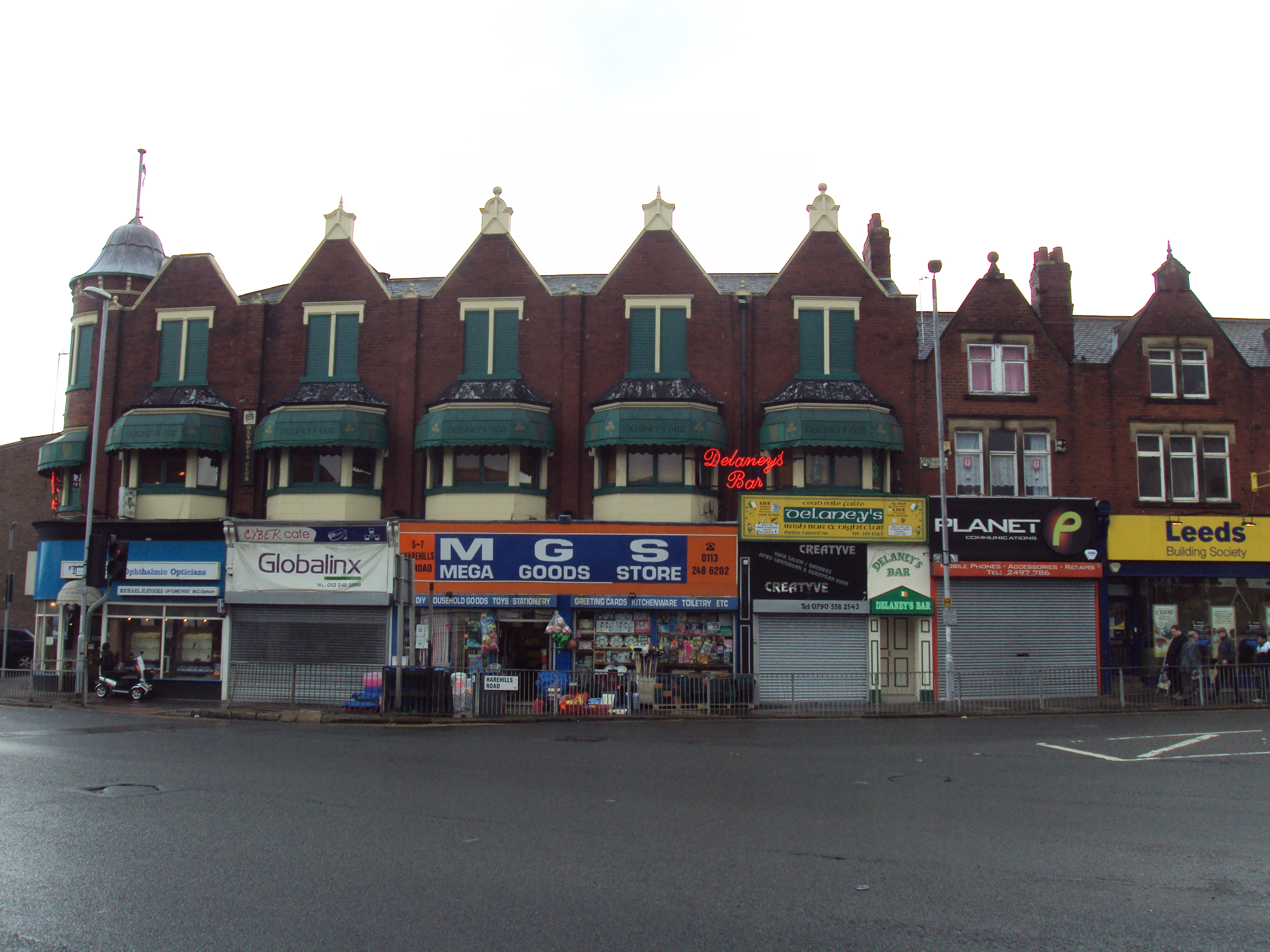
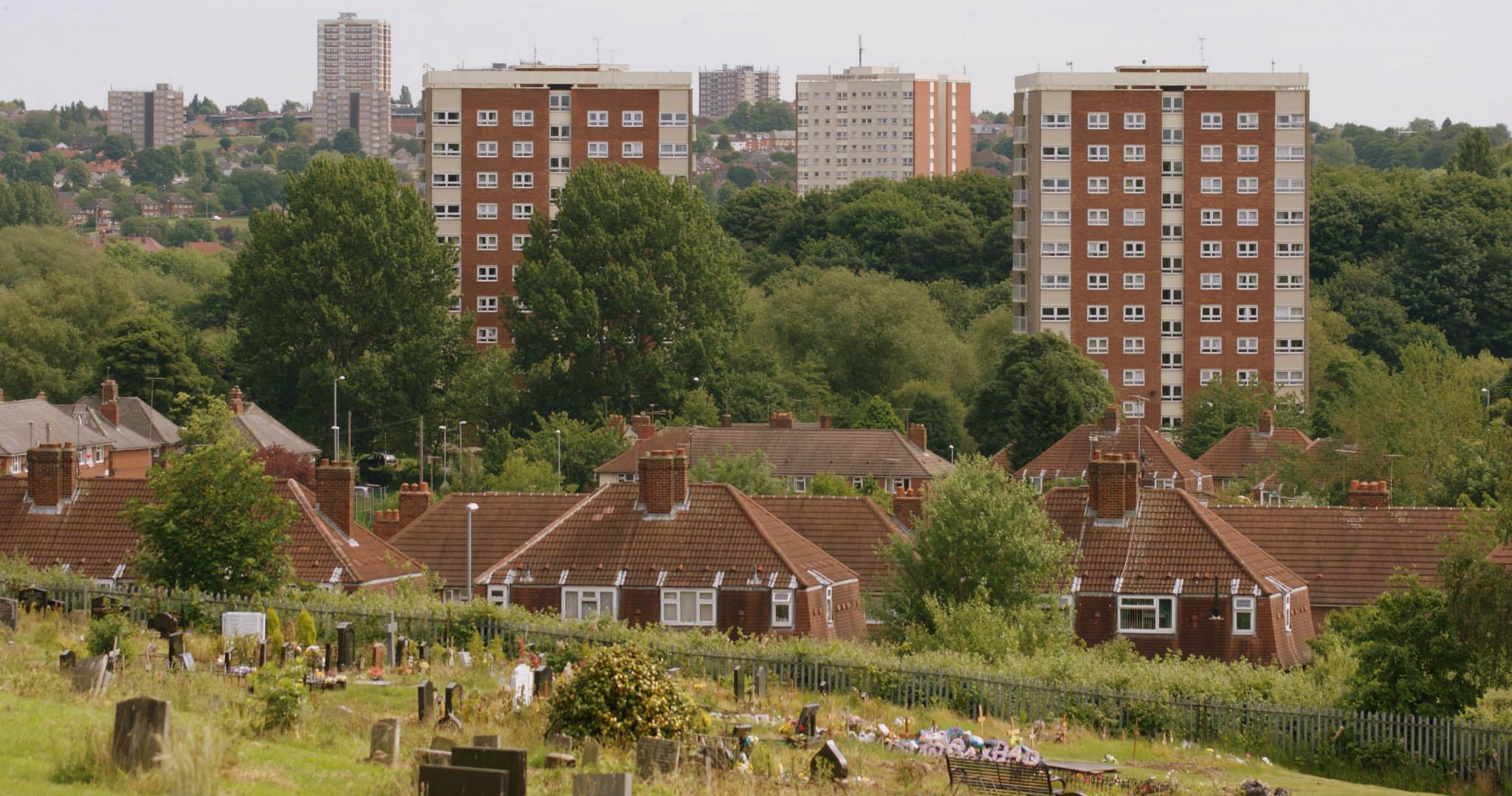
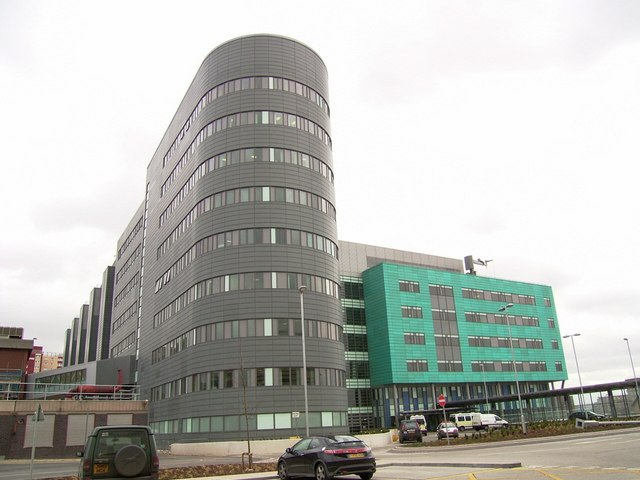
- St Aidan's Bilal Mosque Shops on Roundhay Road The Cemetery St James's Hospital

- Location within West Yorkshire
- OS grid reference: SE326345
- Metropolitan borough: City of Leeds
- Metropolitan county: West Yorkshire
- Region: Yorkshire and the Humber
- Country: England
- Sovereign state: United Kingdom
- Post town: LEEDS
- Postcode district: LS8/LS9
- Dialling code: 0113
- Police: West Yorkshire
- Fire: West Yorkshire
- Ambulance: Yorkshire
- UK Parliament: Leeds East

Harehills is an inner-city area of east Leeds, West Yorkshire, England. It is about 1 mile (1.6 km) northeast of Leeds city centre. Harehills is between the A58 (towards Wetherby) and the A64 (towards York). It sits in the Gipton & Harehills ward of Leeds City Council and the Leeds East parliamentary constituency, between Burmantofts and Gipton, and adjacent to Chapeltown.

Its boundaries are defined by the city council as "the boundary of Spencer Place to the West, Harehills Avenue to the North, the boundary of Foundry Place to the East and Compton Road and Stanley Road to the South." As the name suggests, it is a hill area, basically a south-facing slope, with many streets of terraced houses on hills. In the middle is Banstead Park, a grassy slope with trees and play areas, offering a view over the city of Leeds.

There are two main shopping streets, Harehills Lane and Harehills Road, which both connect with Roundhay Road (the A58 road) at their northern ends. Roundhay Road leads north-eastwards to Oakwood. Also, heading 0.6 miles (1 km) up Harehills Lane towards the A64 York Road at the junction with Compton Road, is Harehills's other main shopping area. Harehills provides many shops such as casinos, corner shops and fast food outlets, jewellers and barber shops. St James' University Hospital is situated in Harehills. Since the 1890s, cheap housing has made it attractive to immigrants, with the result that it has a considerable cultural and ethnic mixture.

On the August Bank Holiday the Leeds Carnival is held with a procession through Harehills and Chapeltown.

== Etymology ==
The name Harehills is first attested in 1576, as Hayr Hylls. Scholars agree that the second element of the name Harehills is the topographic term 'hill'. There has been some debate about the first element, however. Eilert Ekwall, in his influential Concise Oxford Dictionary of English Place Names, thought that the name came from the Old English word hār ('grey'). However, the subsequent research by A. H. Smith for the English Place-Name Society concluded that, as the modern spelling would suggest, the name does originate from hare, and thus originally meant 'hill characterised by the presence of hares'.

== History ==
Bayswater Avenue in 1953

=== 19th century ===
In the early 19th century, the area covered by Harehills existed as woods between Leeds and the village of Chapel Allerton. Leeds had developed in the west, north and south but not much to the east. The area began to be developed from the 1820s, when people sought to escape the overcrowding in the centre of Leeds, wide streets and detached houses were envisaged in a plan titled 'New Leeds'. However, it was closely packed back-to-back housing for workers that came to be built in the 1890s. Expansion happened very rapidly. Harehills was on the route of the Leeds Tramway to Roundhay and Chapeltown opened from 1891. Transport links contributed to the growth of the area.

In 1891, Harehills Board School opened on Roundhay Road, designed by Charles Barker Howdill (1863–1940). In 1897, the Gipton Board School was opened on Harehills Road, designed by Walter Samuel Braithwaite (1854–1922). Braithwaite used features found in many of the Leeds Board Schools built at this time, in a Renaissance Revival style. It later became known as Gipton Council School, and in the 1950s, Harehills County Secondary School. It became Harehills Middle in the 1970s and closed in 1992 later being redeveloped as a business centre that encourages start-ups and social enterprises. In the 1890s, St Aidans Anglican church was built on Roundhay Road in a Romanesque style with mosaics by Frank Brangwyn; it was designed by Robert James Johnson of Newcastle.

=== 20th century ===
Irish Catholics who settled in the area received a parish church in 1905; Scottish Presbyterians also settled here early on. Following rapid growth around the turn of the century, two churches were built on Harehills Road close to each other: a temporary Catholic church and Congregationalist church built by Tom Dyer in 1900–1901. The Sunday School of the Congregationalist Church is now the Bilal Mosque, constructed in 1999 to designs by Atba Al-Samarraie. The Baptist community planned a chapel on Harehills Lane designed by the London firm James Cubitt & Manchip in 1906–1907, finally built after World War I; the hall is notable for its use of light and its Italian Romanesque design. On Harehills Avenue, Trinity Presbyterian Church was built in 1906 by W H Beevers in a Gothic style and a Primitive Methodist Chapel by Dinsley was also built on the Avenue.

By the time that the 1906 Ordnance Survey map was produced, Harehills was an established community. At this time Harehills was home to a purpose-built reservoir sited between Harehills Lane and Harehills Recreation Ground, shown on the 1906 map as owned by the Leeds Corporation Waterworks. The 1906 map also shows two clothing factories on Hudson Road along with a shoe works and a brick works between Hudson Road and Harehills Lane as well as an iron works on York Road. Harehills and the surrounding area also had significant mining infrastructure.

Sydney Kitson designed the Church of England parish church of St Wilfrid in an Arts and Crafts style in 1913, but its construction did not begin until 1927. Jewish refugees from Russia and Poland formed a community around Spencer Place in the 1920s. The Third Church of Christ Scientist on Easterly Road was designed by Davidson, Son & Sherwood in 1927; it became the home of the Pentecostal New Testament Church of God in 1984 after the group had met in private homes in Leeds since 1959. The Catholic church of St Augustine was designed by Gribbon, Foggit and Brown in 1937 in a more modernist style notable for its open interior structure, replacing the early 20th century temporary church on the site. In 1958–9, Geoffrey Davy designed the Anglican church of St Cyprian with St James on Coldcotes Avenue; it is designed in a Corbusier style around an organ from St James church in the city centre and has typical contemporary stained glass used by Davy in several churches.

After 1921, Montague Burton's established the largest textile factory in the world on Hudson Road, where 10,000 people worked, producing 3,000 suits a week; the factory had a large canteen. In the middle of the 20th century, Harehills had three cinemas, a roller rink and dance hall, all have closed since. To the south of Harehills, St James' Hospital grew out of a workhouse and industrial school particularly in the 1950s and 1960s. Following World War II, Greek Cypriots and Eastern European immigrants settled in Harehills; there has been a Lithuanian supermarket there since the 1970s. In the 1950s, invited workers arrived from the West Indies, particularly Saint Kitts, and in the 1960s, immigrants arrived from Pakistan and Bangladesh. The arrival of many people from the West Indies in the 1950s led to a growth of Pentecostal communities. The Greek community bought a former Methodist church on Harehills Avenue in 1966 and renovated it to make a church and accommodation for social and schooling activities, consecrating the church of The Three Hierarchs in 1985. Since World War II, the manufacturing industry in the area has declined to be replaced by small shops and restaurants reflecting the vibrant ethnic mix of the area. Many pubs have closed because of the change in population with many Muslims in the area; the Clock cinema has become an ice cream parlour.

Ashley Road and Darfield Crescent

In the 1970s and 1980s, the Fforde Grene pub hosted many gigs. In 1984, some terraced houses in the area around the roads "Sandhurst Terrace", "Dorset Road", "Dorset Mount" and "Dorset Avenue" appeared in the beginning of rock band Queen's music video for "I Want To Break Free".

The Central Jamia Mosque or Leeds Islamic Centre, Spencer Place was designed by Finn & Downes Associates in 1997–2000, replacing the Chadssidishe Shul synagogue of 1934, whose hall still exists behind the mosque.

=== 21st century ===
In the 2000s, many Eastern European immigrants moved to Harehills, particularly from Poland and the area is also home to refugees from Zimbabwe, Somalia and Iraq as well as asylum seekers. Shah Jalal Mosque in Ellers Road was built in 2003-2004 designed by Atba Al-Samarraie, replacing a late 1970s conversion of two houses into a mosque by the Bangladesh Islamic Society; it is noted for its sensitive engagement with the surrounding Victorian red-brick terraced houses.

Racial tensions have caused problems in the area, contributing to the Harehills riot in 2001. Residents interviewed in 2002 noted their discontent at how the area had deteriorated since the 1970s. One resident described Harehills as "a horrible place to live" and complained about joy riding, rubbish, drug dealing, arson and vermin. The man's report went on to say: "Often you will see a group of young children chasing vermin into an overgrown backyard. This is a sight you would expect to see in a third-world country not the modern, vibrant city that Leeds portrays itself to be." Another resident described it as being a pleasant place until the 1970s, but has since changed "beyond recognition". However a third interviewed resident was more positive, although critical in her report, and echoing many of the complaints before, she mentions the "pride of the residents in the upkeep of their houses".

As housing has increasingly been bought to let out much less money has been spent on the upkeep of houses and gardens. A report published in 2008 notes that there was a high level of crime in the area particularly related to drugs and gangs. The Fforde Grene Public House (now closed) was raided by police in 2004 who recovered drugs and guns. A man was shot in 2008, believed to be a case of mistaken identity. Another shooting also occurred in 2008. In 2008, a 14-year-old girl was sexually assaulted and murdered by a serial attacker who lived nearby. In 2019, police and firefighters were pelted with bricks and other missiles on Bonfire Night.

Community groups have combatted youth crime by running cultural and sporting activities. A feature of the community effort is a number of colourful mosaic street signs, made by youths who are residents of Harehills. In 2014–15, it was reported that several voluntary sector agencies operate within the area including Shantona Women's Centre, Bangladeshi Centre, ECHO centre, Bilal Sports Centre and CATCH Hovingham Hub. Over the past years residents and local agencies have come together and organised community events like the Harehills Festival in 2018.

Since 2008, Shine social enterprise has had a great impact supporting non-violent women ex-offenders to reintegrate into society and take care of their children; providing education and cultural activities for local children; supporting entrepreneurs and artists to develop sustainable local businesses; and in helping the environment by providing green space and working towards improving pedestrian and cycling routes in Harehills.

The area saw more rioting on 18 July 2024, with West Yorkshire Police officers attacked, cars and a First West Yorkshire bus set alight by local residents, substantial vandalism, and anti-police sentiment as a result of local residents upset by a disturbance involving agency workers and children. The rioting began when a crowd of hundreds of people began attacking a marked police car. Footage shared on social media showed individuals using scooters, pushchairs, bikes, and bats to assault the vehicle. The police car was overturned, and fires were lit on the streets of the community.

== Regeneration ==
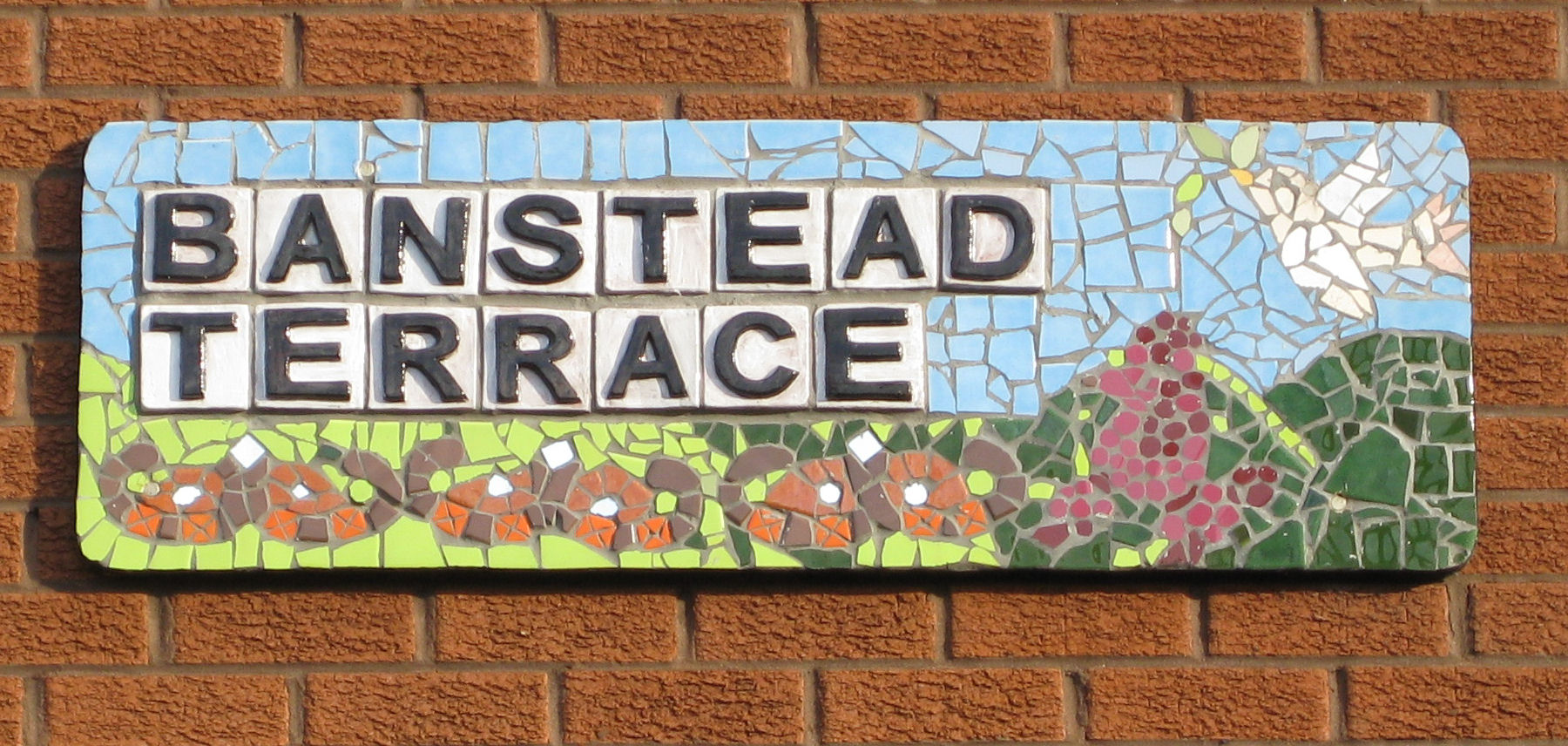
Street sign in Harehills

In November 2003, Harehills received £100,000 toward regeneration from Yorkshire Forward. Investment has also included a children's centre which opened in March 2006. Improvements to The Compton Centre community hub and library have been made to include a one-stop centre and job shop for Leeds City Council. In 2014–2015, the Harehills Neighbourhood Improvement Plan was put in place addressing issues of health and wellbeing; unemployment and local economy; crime and anti-social behaviour; the local environment; and community activities to encourage community cohesion. Harehills Lane Shopping was allocated £200,000 of funding under the Town and District Centre scheme. Leeds City Council reported investment in the area in 2021.

== Amenities ==
Harehills' amenities are not located within one centre but spread across the area, mainly on Roundhay Road and Harehills Lane; there are many small shops, restaurants and supermarkets, including catering for different immigrant communities. Roundhay Road has been referred to as 'Curry Mile'. There are several public houses in Harehills, although considerably fewer than there once were. The last Pub remaining in Harehills is the Samuel Smith Old Brewery pub, The Brown Hare.

Harehills Conservative Club is a large brick building on Harehills Lane, and Harehills Liberal Club is round the corner on Foundry Approach.

Schools include Bankside Primary School, Co-op Academy Nightingale, Co-op Academy Woodlands, Hovingham Primary School, Harehills Primary School and St Augustine's Catholic Primary School. There are no secondary schools actually in Harehills.

== Transport ==
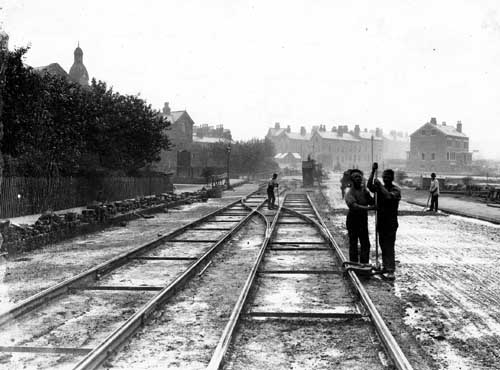
Construction of the former tramway along Roundhay Road in Harehills

Harehills is between the A58 and the A64. Harehills is well-placed for access to Leeds city centre and Wetherby. Buses run through Harehills to Leeds city centre, Oakwood, Roundhay, Gipton, Seacroft and Wetherby.

Harehills was served by the Leeds Tramway. In 1949 Tetley's Coaches, a local coach operator, was founded in Harehills. However, since then the coach operator has moved its offices to Hunslet.

Harehills was on a proposed route of the Leeds Supertram before its cancellation. The location of St James' University Hospital prompted the inclusion of Harehills in the Trolleybus project however the Trolleybus plans were cancelled in May 2016 because it was claimed that they would have provided little value for money.

== Demographics ==
Part of the Gipton and Harehills ward, in 2015 this ward had the highest levels of unemployment in Leeds. In 2020, it was described as the second most socio-economically deprived area in Leeds; 74.2% of households in the area were deprived in 2021. In 2023, the most frequently reported crimes were violence and sexual offences, public order violations, and incidents of criminal damage and arson. In 2024 West Yorkshire Police reported that crime in the ward had reduced by 40% over the preceding year.

According to the 2021 census for the wider ward, 38.2% of people are Asian, 34.5% are white, 17.4% are Black, with mixed, Arab and other ethnic groups comprising the rest of the community. Within the total population, 23.7% are self-define as English, Welsh, Scottish or Northern Irish, whilst 22.6% are Pakistani or British Pakistani. The community is diverse, with a local resident describing the area as: "Romanian, Gypsy, Pakistani, Asian – this is what it means to be from Harehills". Leeds' Roma community is mostly based in the area, although there are also Roma communities living in Beeston and Armley.

== Religion ==
The area has at least eight places of worship, indicative of the changing population of the area, with an Anglican church being the oldest and a mosque the most recent. The oldest is St Aidan's, the Church of England parish church. The Anglican Church St Wilfrid's on Chatsworth Road is part of the Forward in Faith movement. The Roman Catholic parish church is St Augustine's, a 1937 brick building on Harehills Road, a little to the north of Banstead Park. On Banstead Terrace, the north side of Banstead Park is the Trinity United Church a 1983 brick building. It combined congregations from a Methodist and two United Reformed Churches in the area. On Harehills Lane is the Baptist Church, a 1928 brick building and the Jamia Masjid Bilal Mosque built in 1996 to serve the local Pakistani community, but now having a much more diverse congregation of recent immigrants. On Easterly Road an old school building is (since 1988) home to the New Testament Church of God, a Pentecostal congregation of mainly African or Afro-Caribbean origin. The only Greek Orthodox Church in Leeds is The Three Hierarchs, in a former Methodist Church (1906 stone building) on Harehills Avenue, which attracts worshippers from all over Yorkshire.

As of the 2021 United Kingdom census, the area's religious makeup is 41.9% Muslim, 37% Christian, 17.4% No Religion, with smaller numbers of Hindu and Sikh communities.

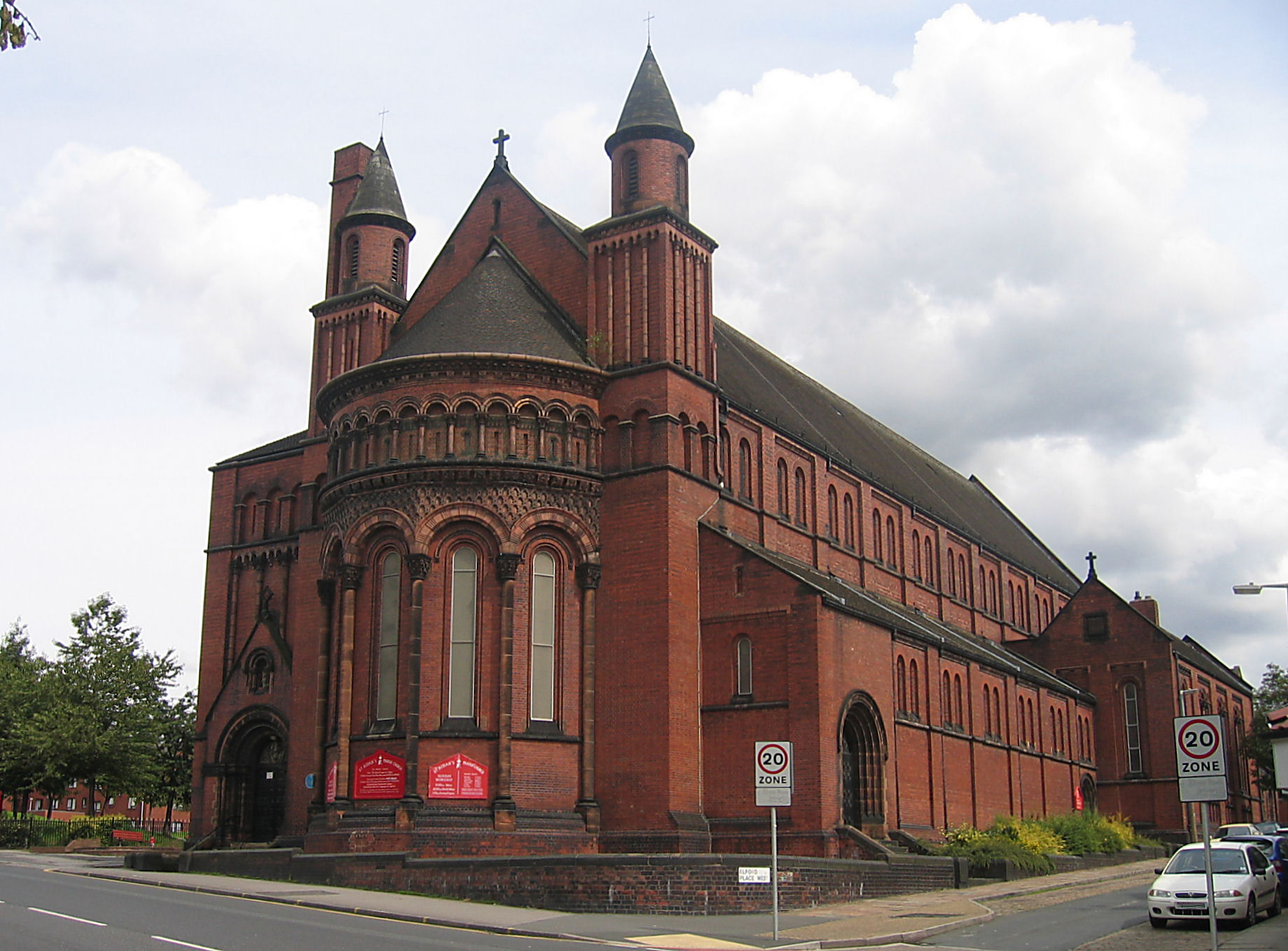
St Aidan's Anglican Church 1894

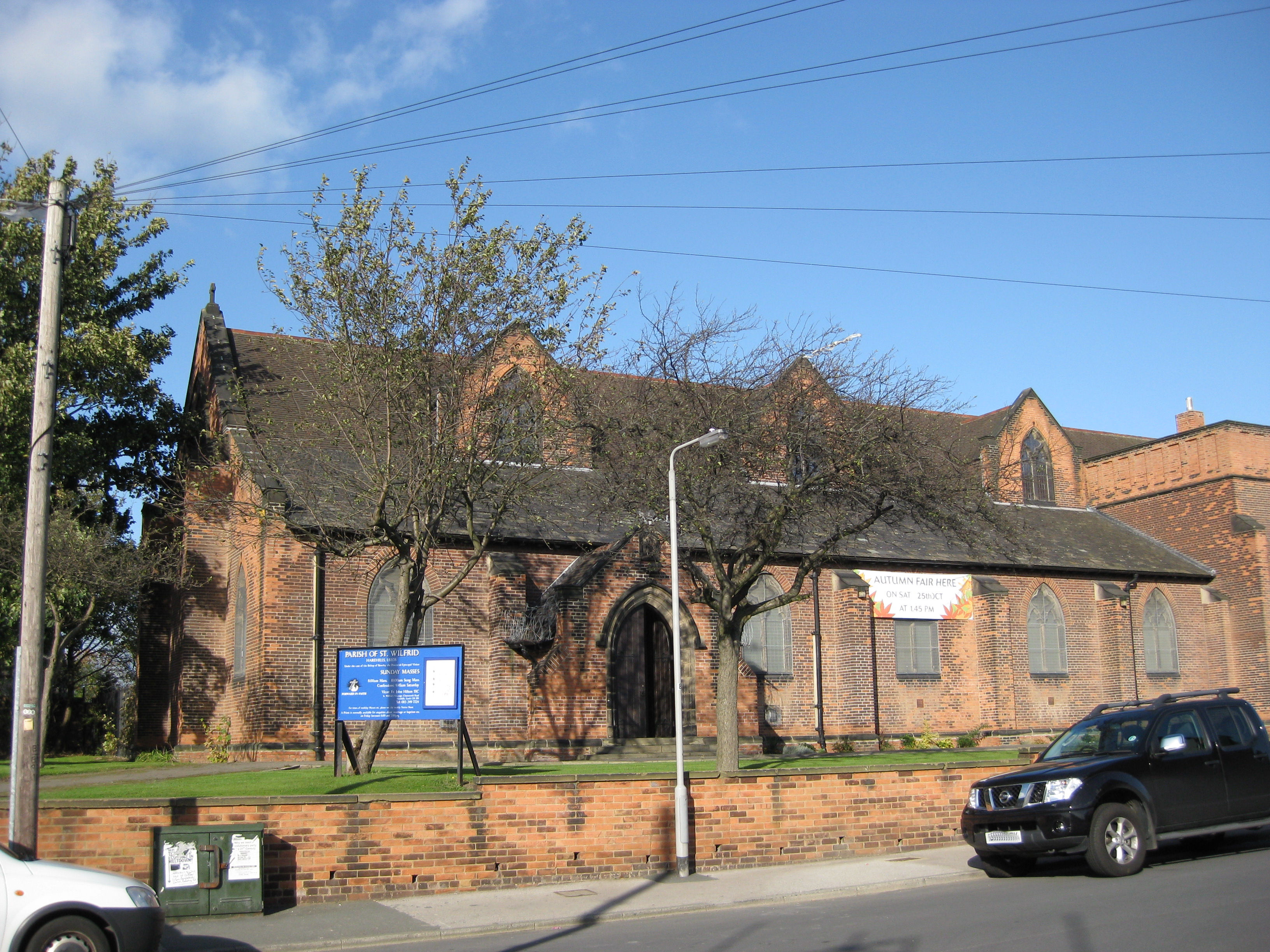
St Wilfrid's Anglican Church 1927

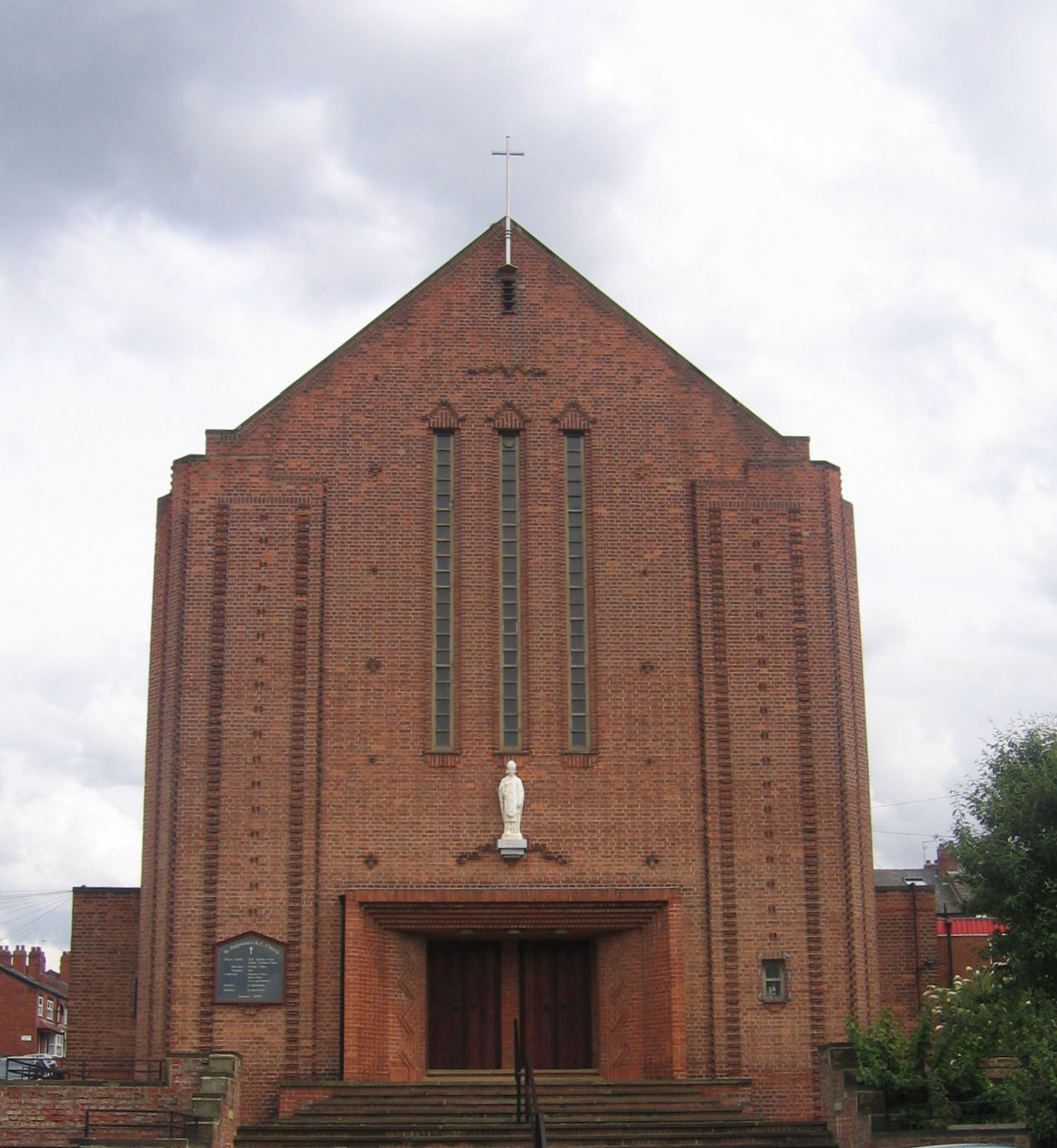
St Augustine's Roman Catholic Church 1937

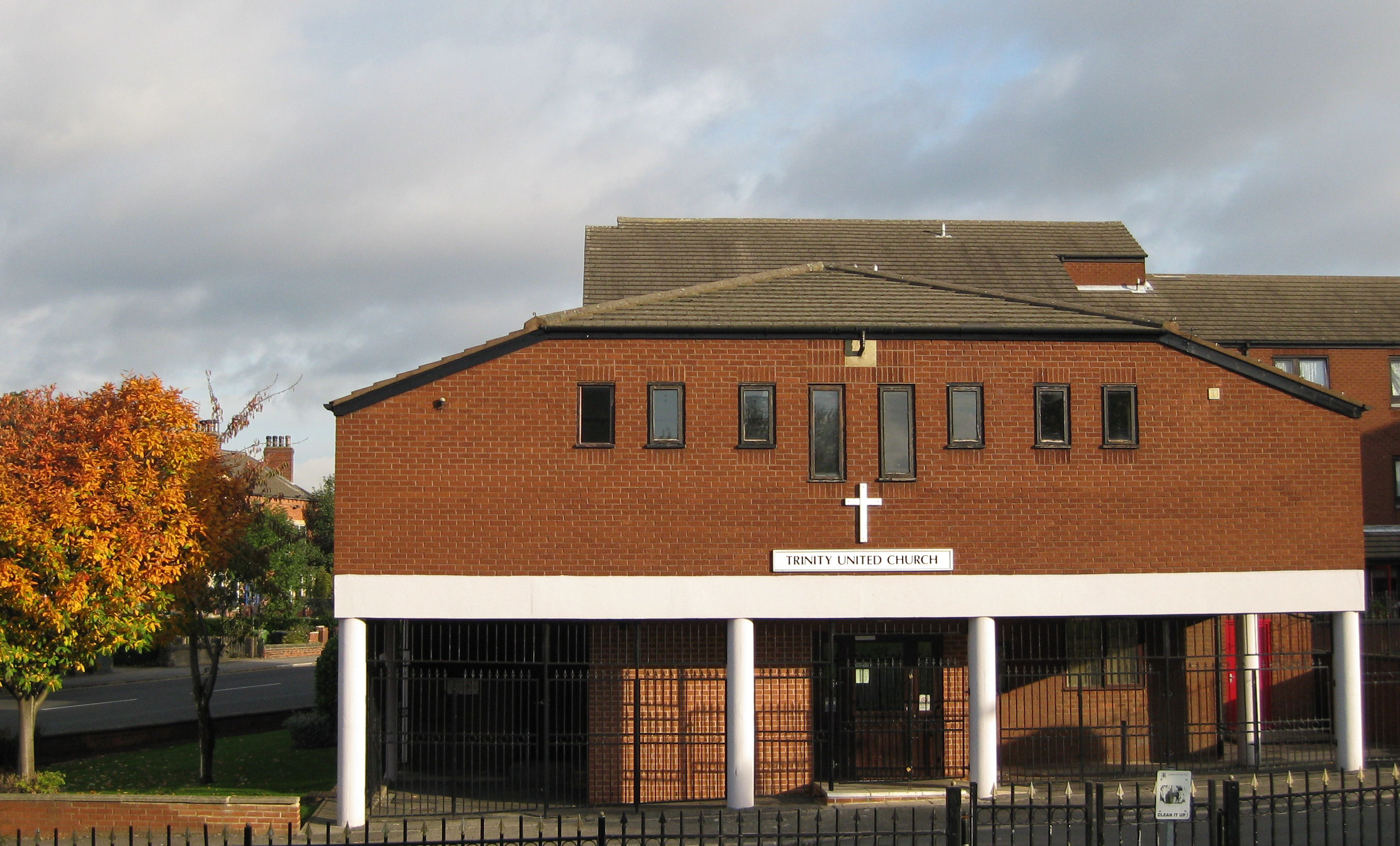
Trinity United Church 1983

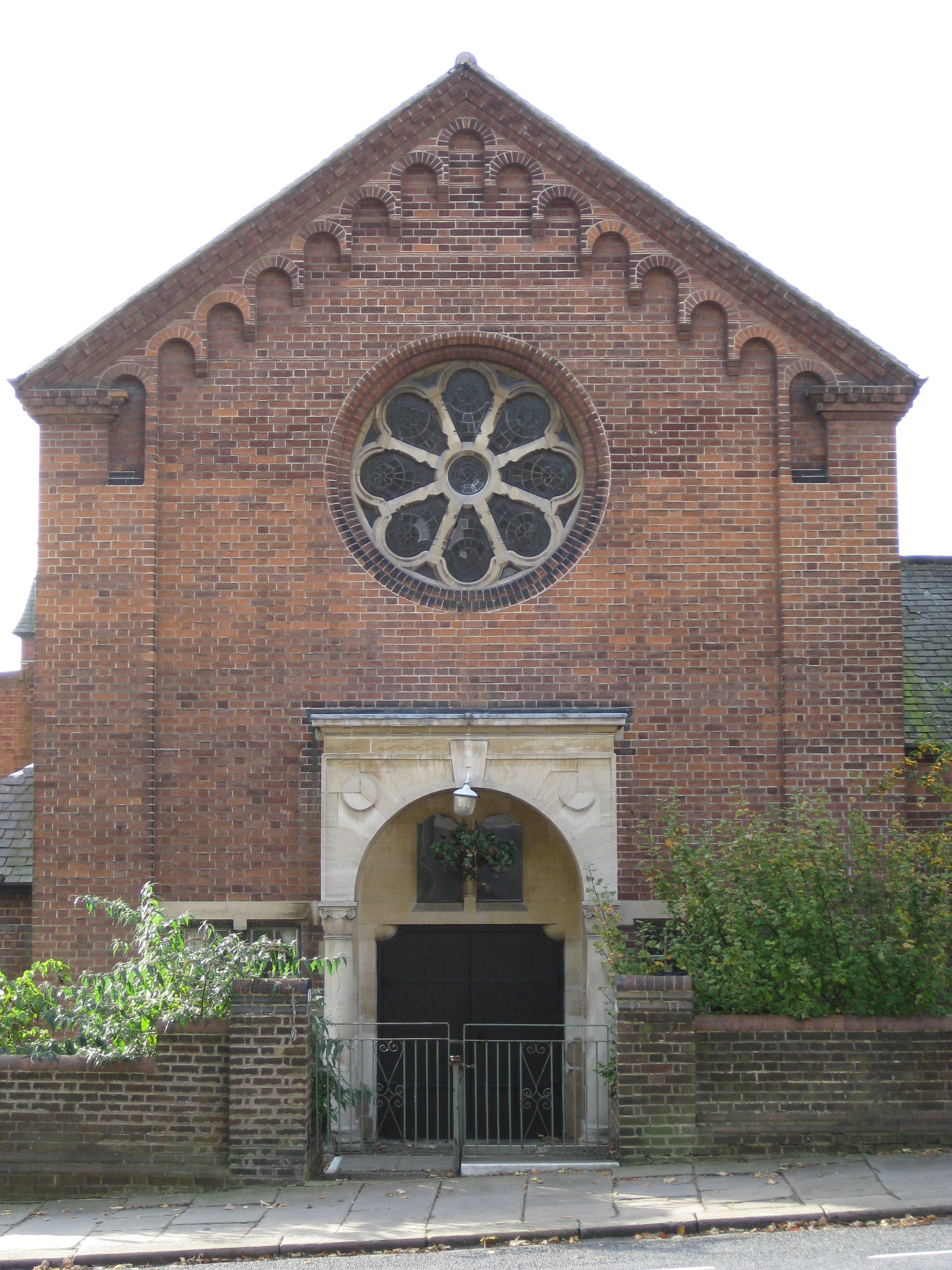
Harehills Lane Baptist Church 1928

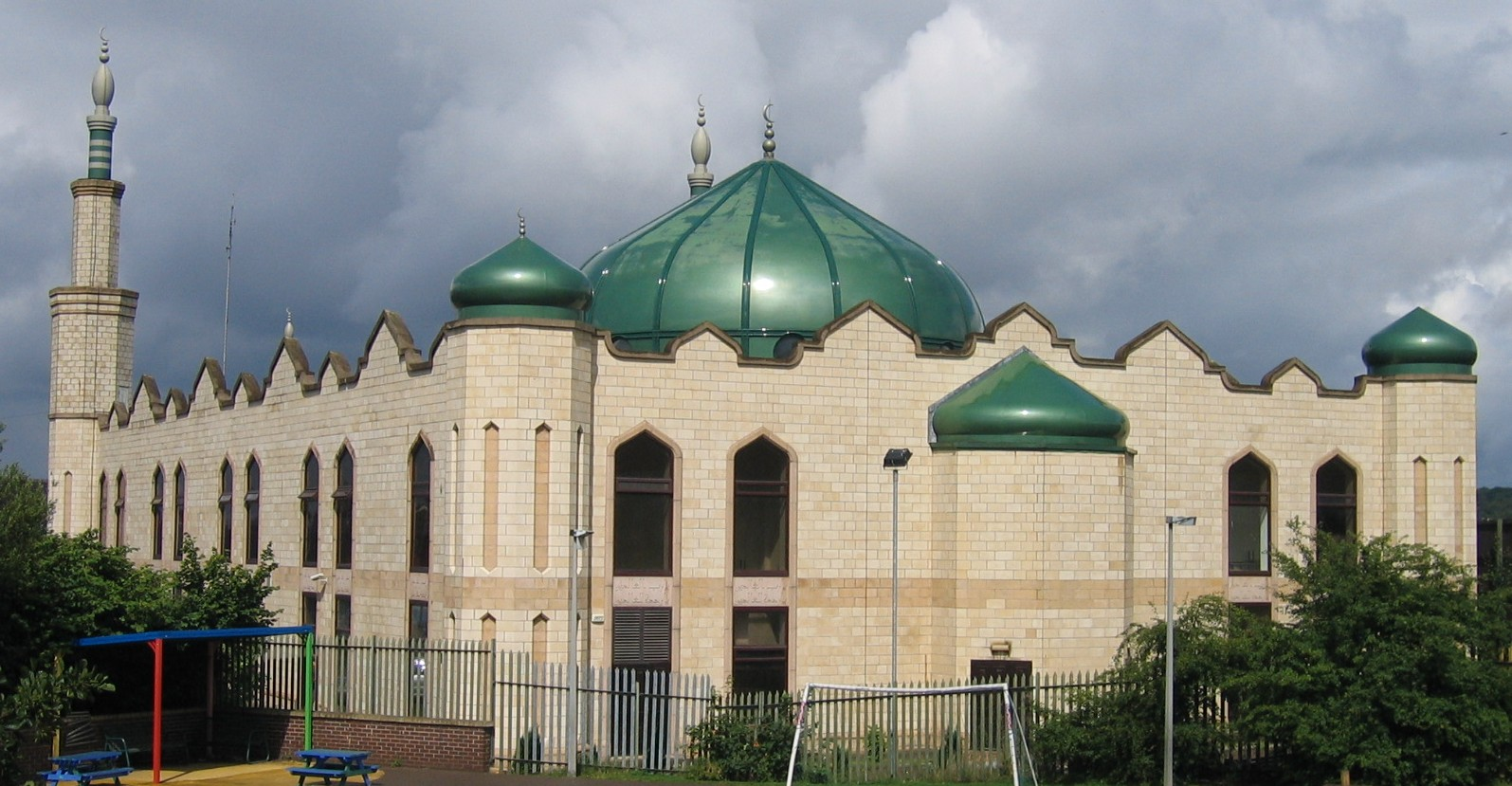
Jamia Masjid Bilal Mosque 1996

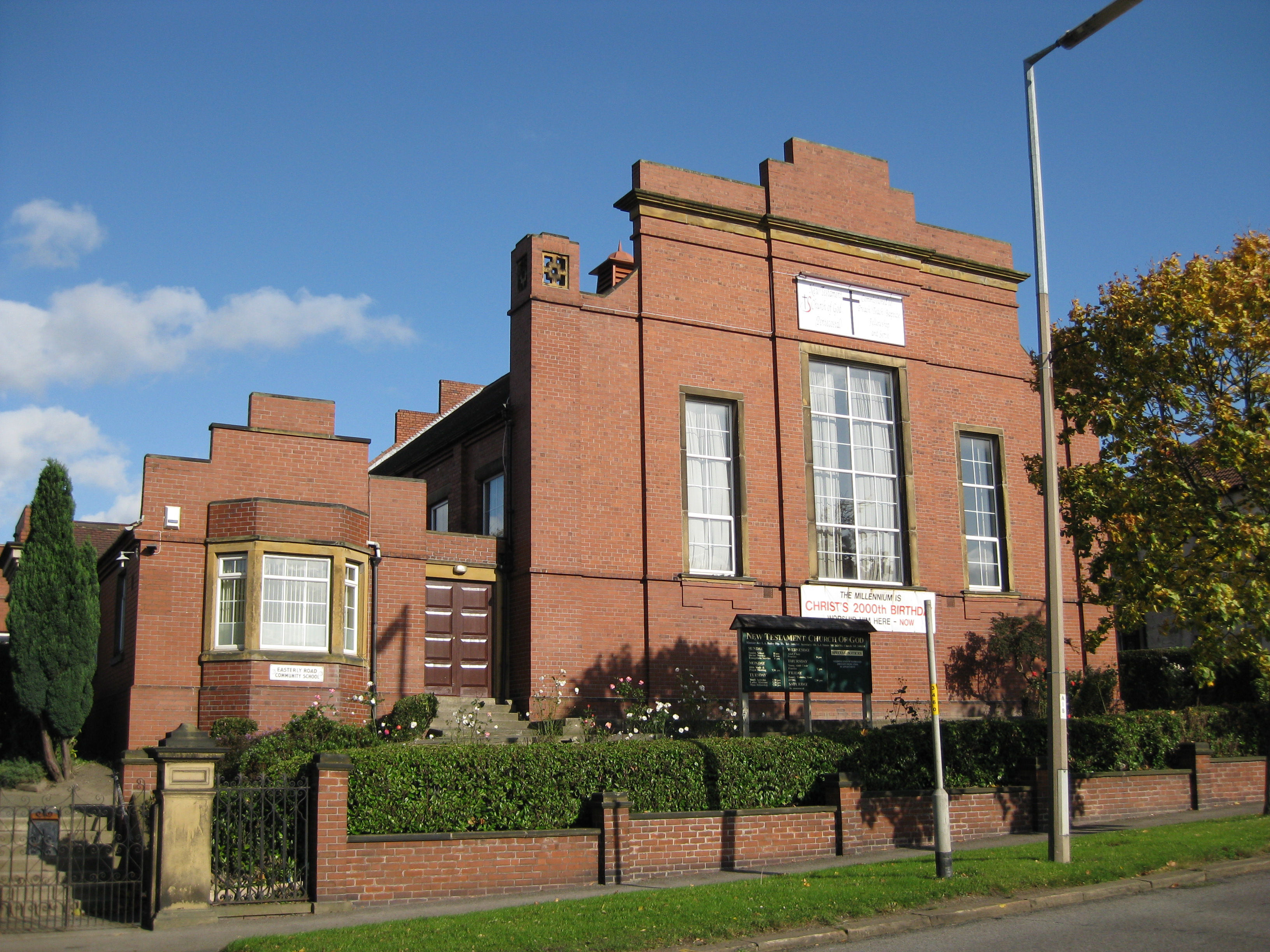
New Testament Church of God

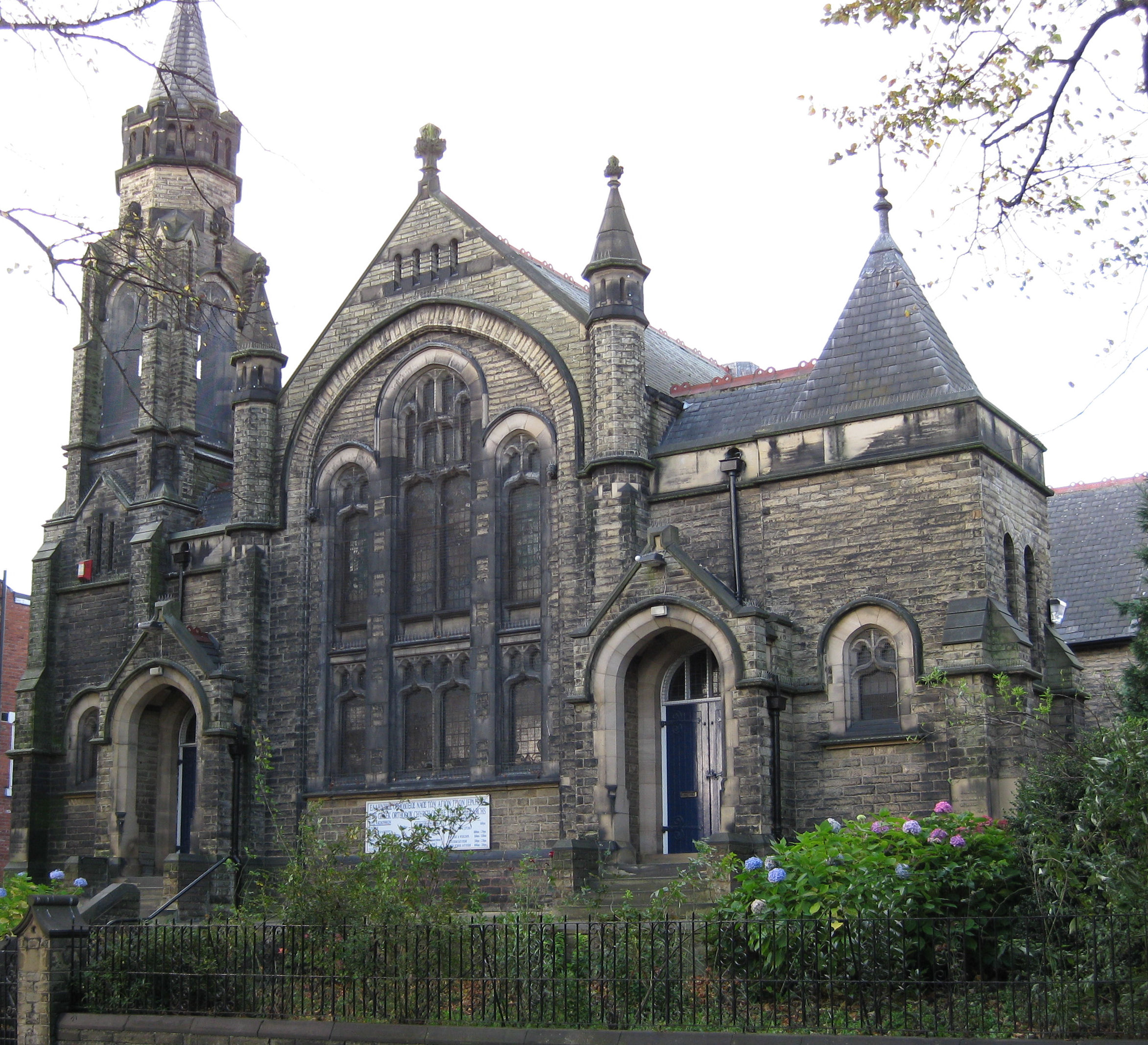
Three Hierarchs Greek Orthodox Church (former Methodist 1906)

== Gallery ==
Images of Harehills

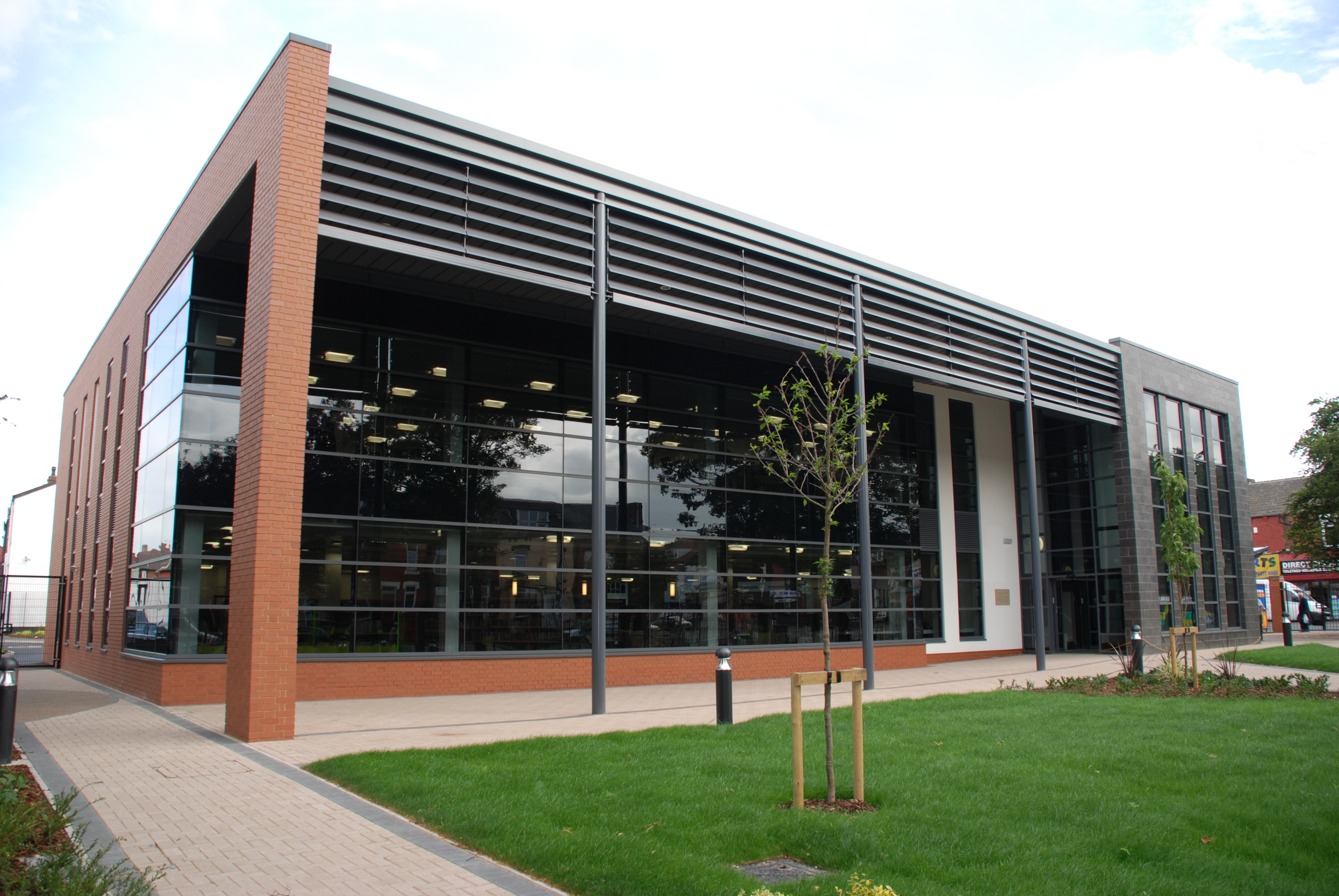
The Compton Centre Community Hub and Library

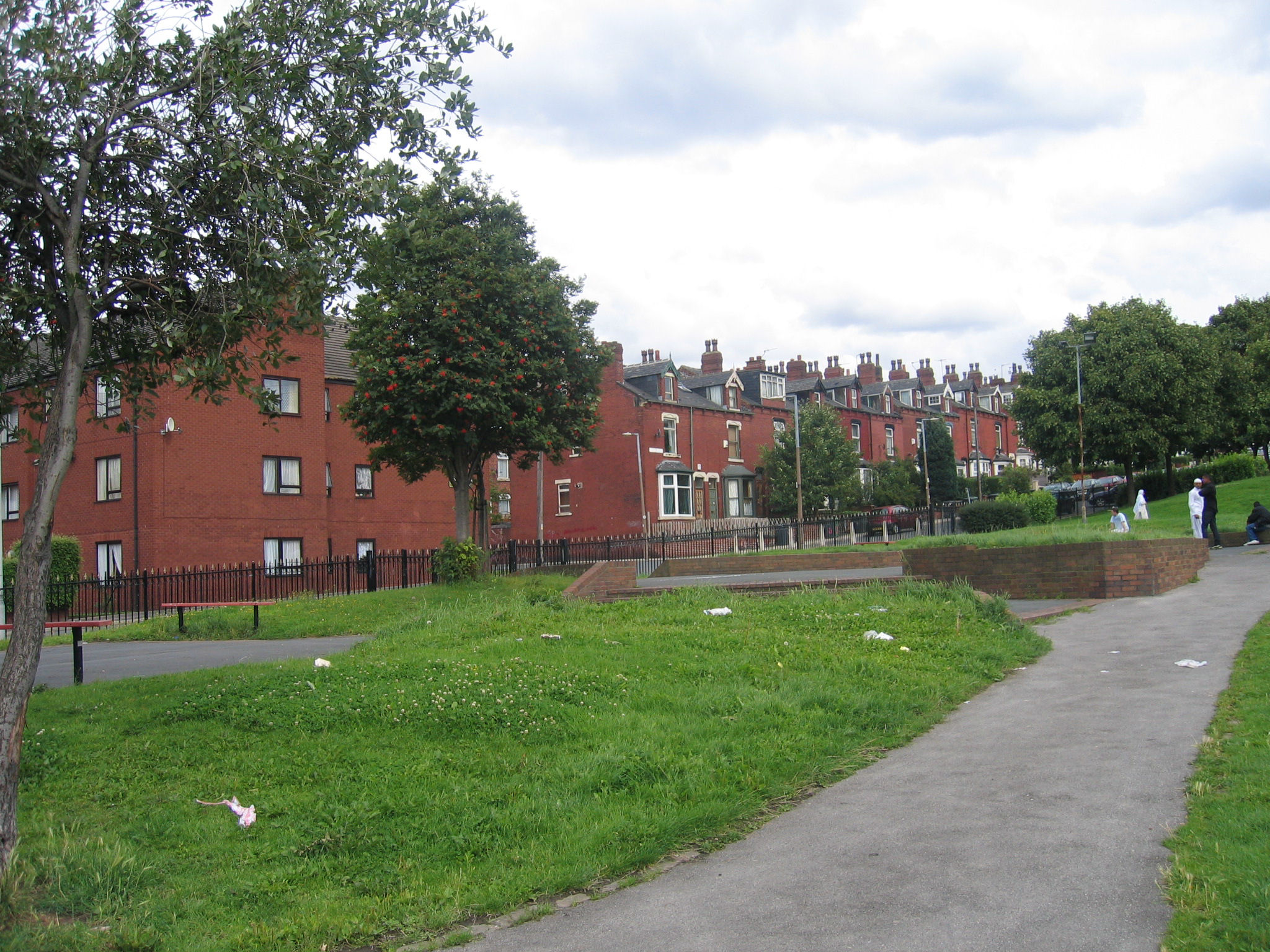
Banstead Park

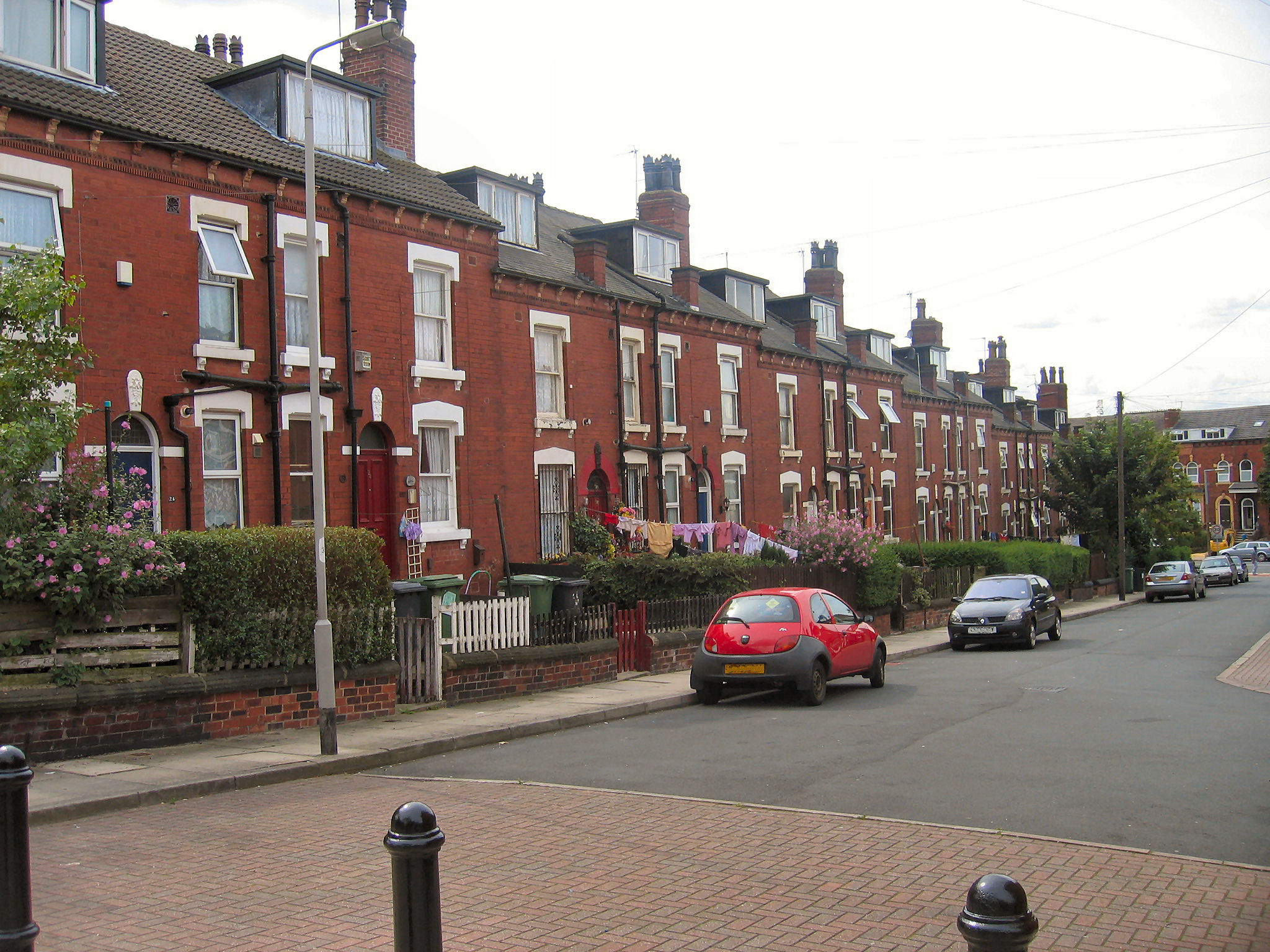
Terraced Housing

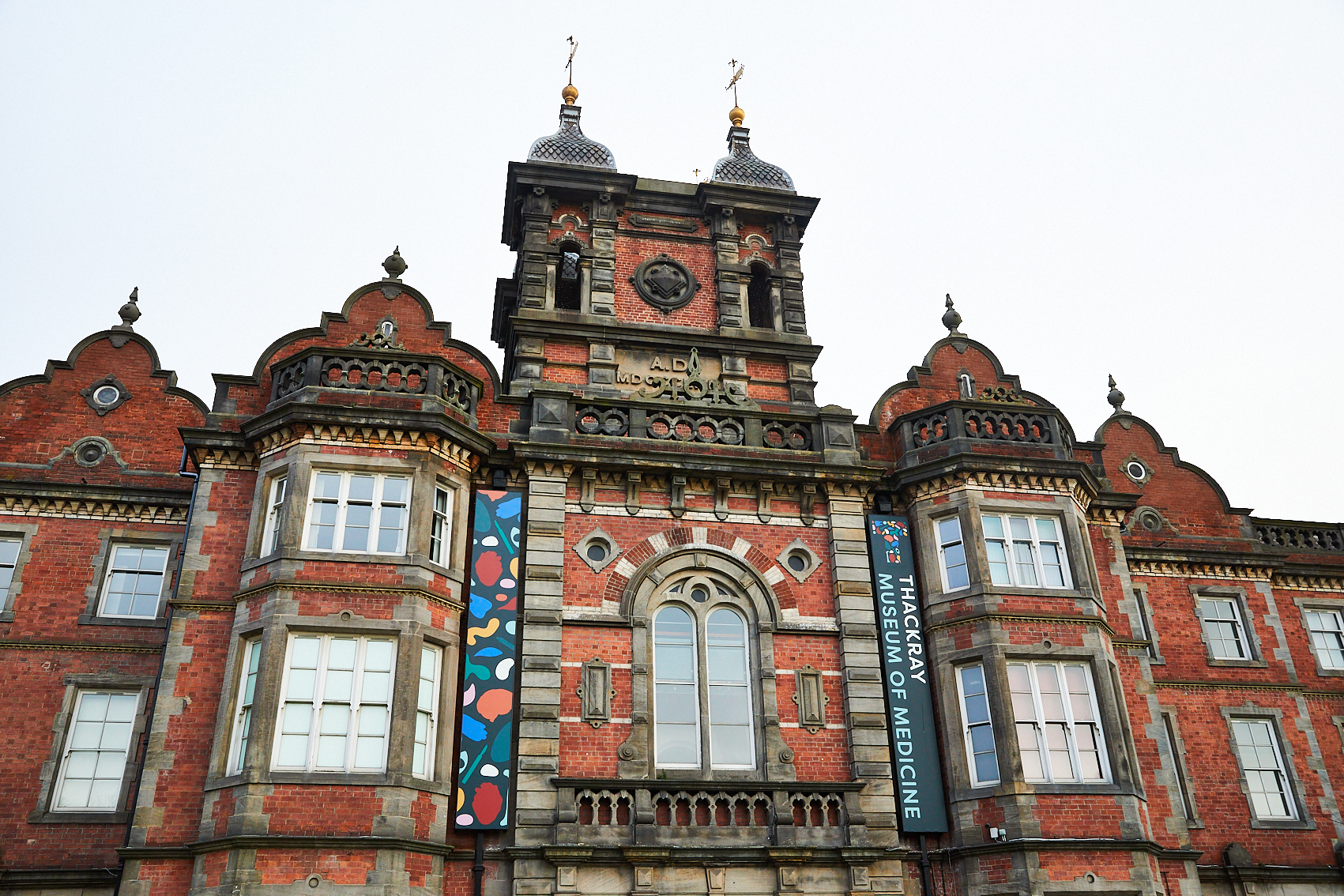
Thackray Museum of Medicine

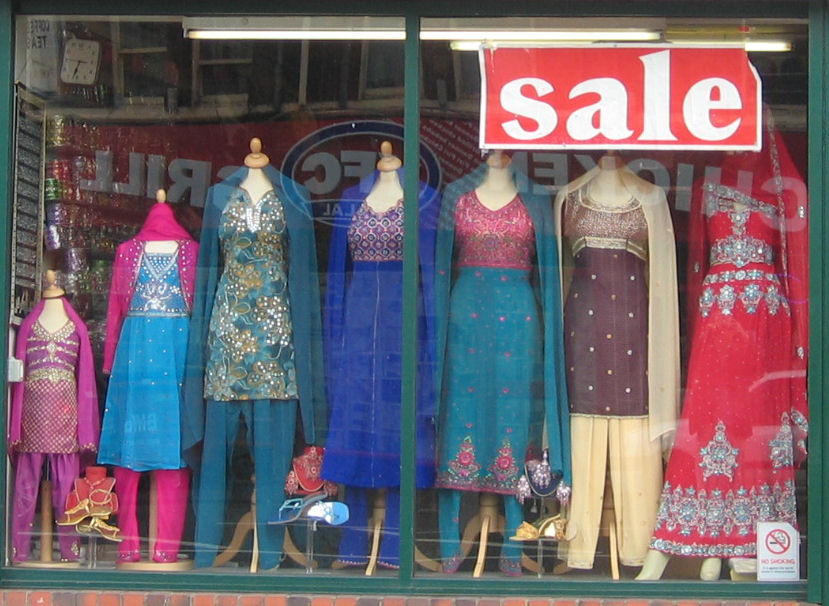
Clothing Shop

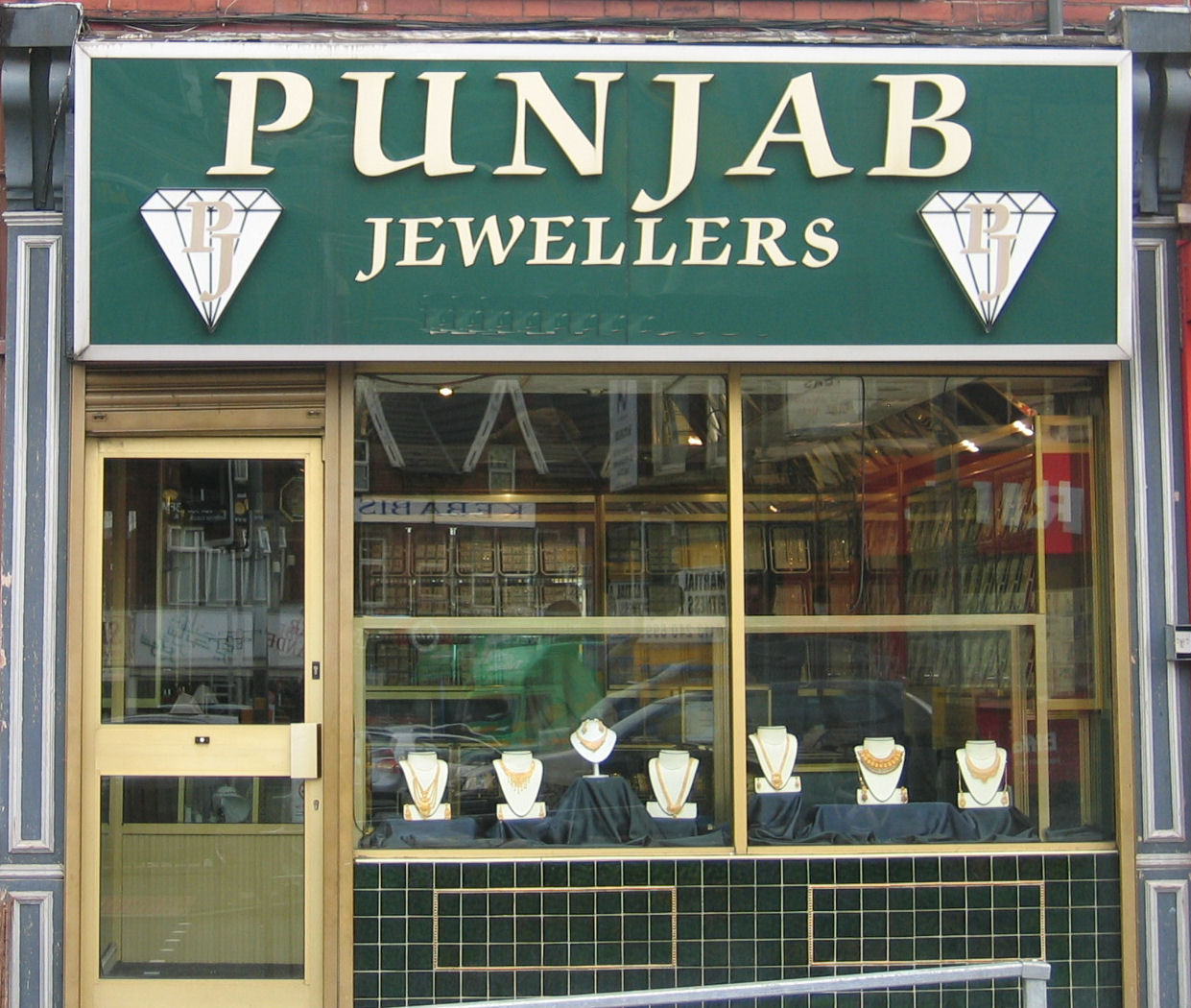
Jewellers

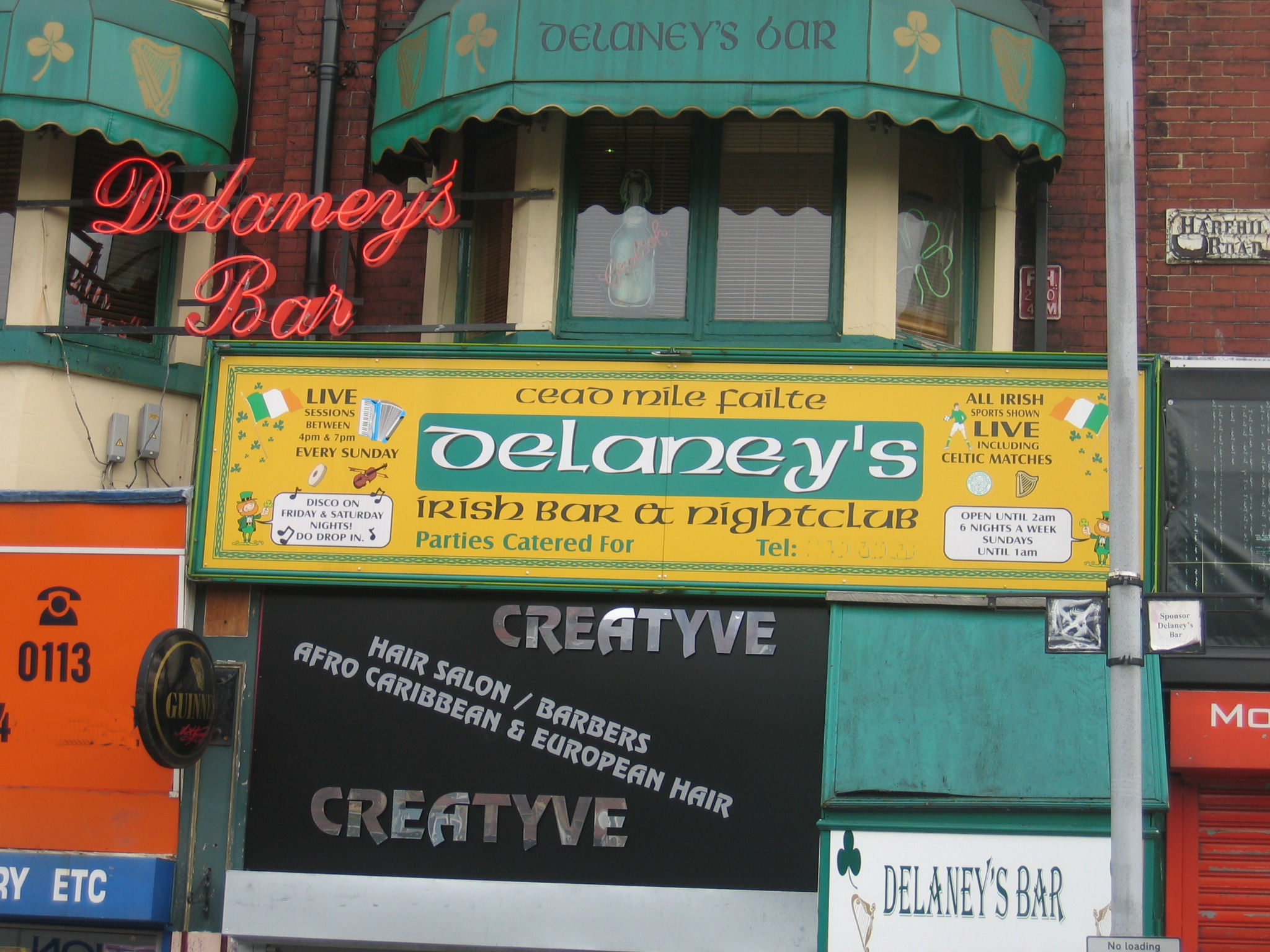
Delaney's Bar

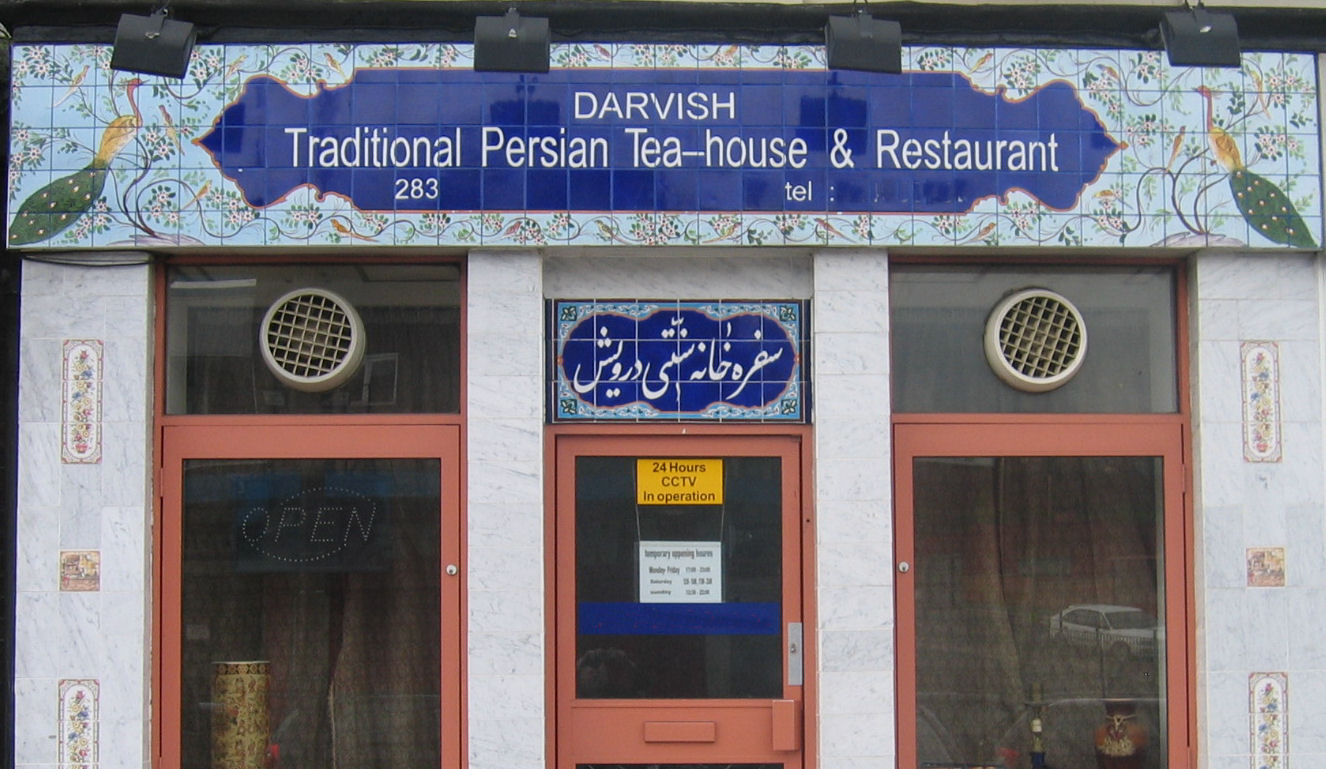
Persian Tea-house

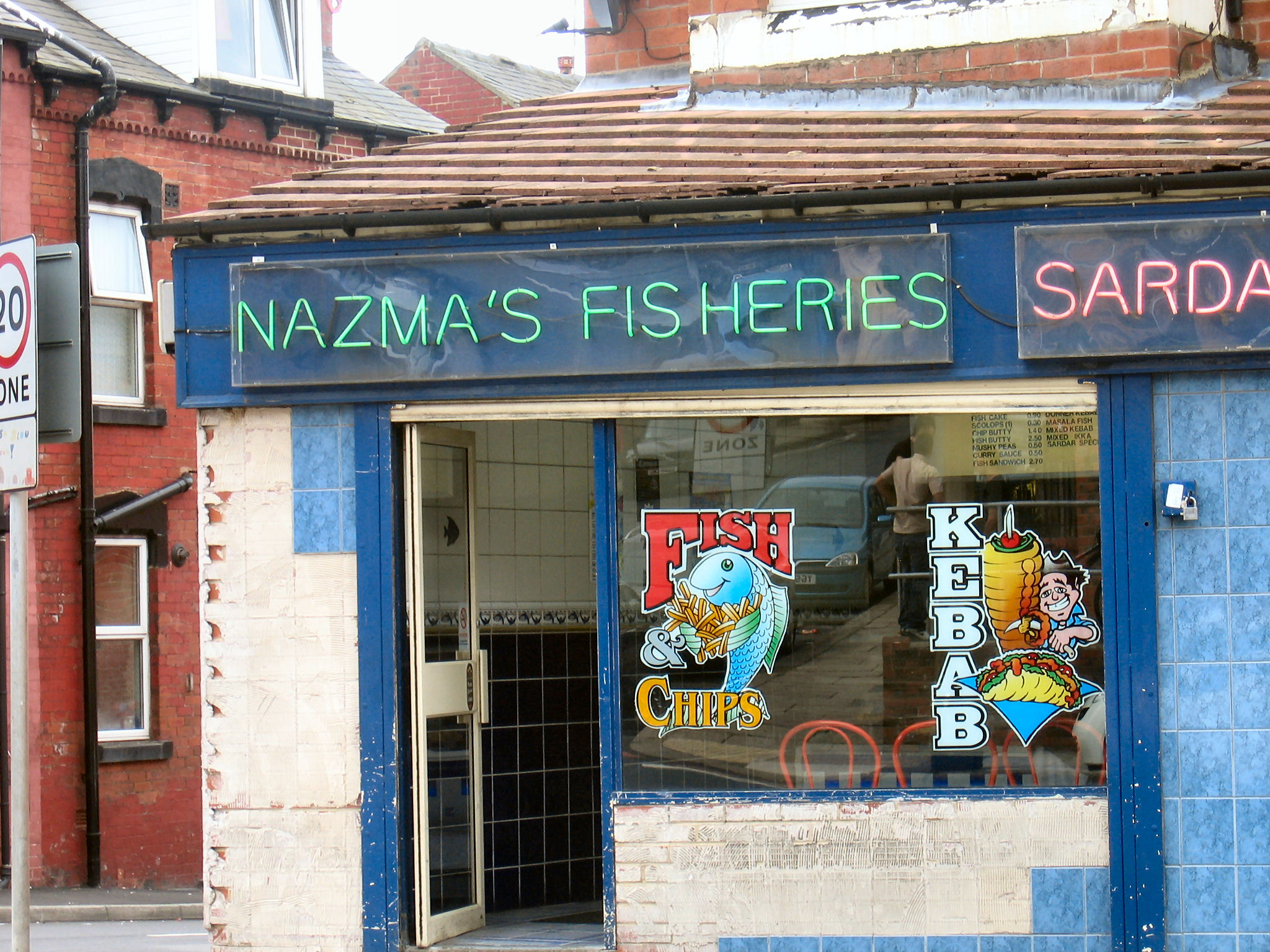
Fish and Chips

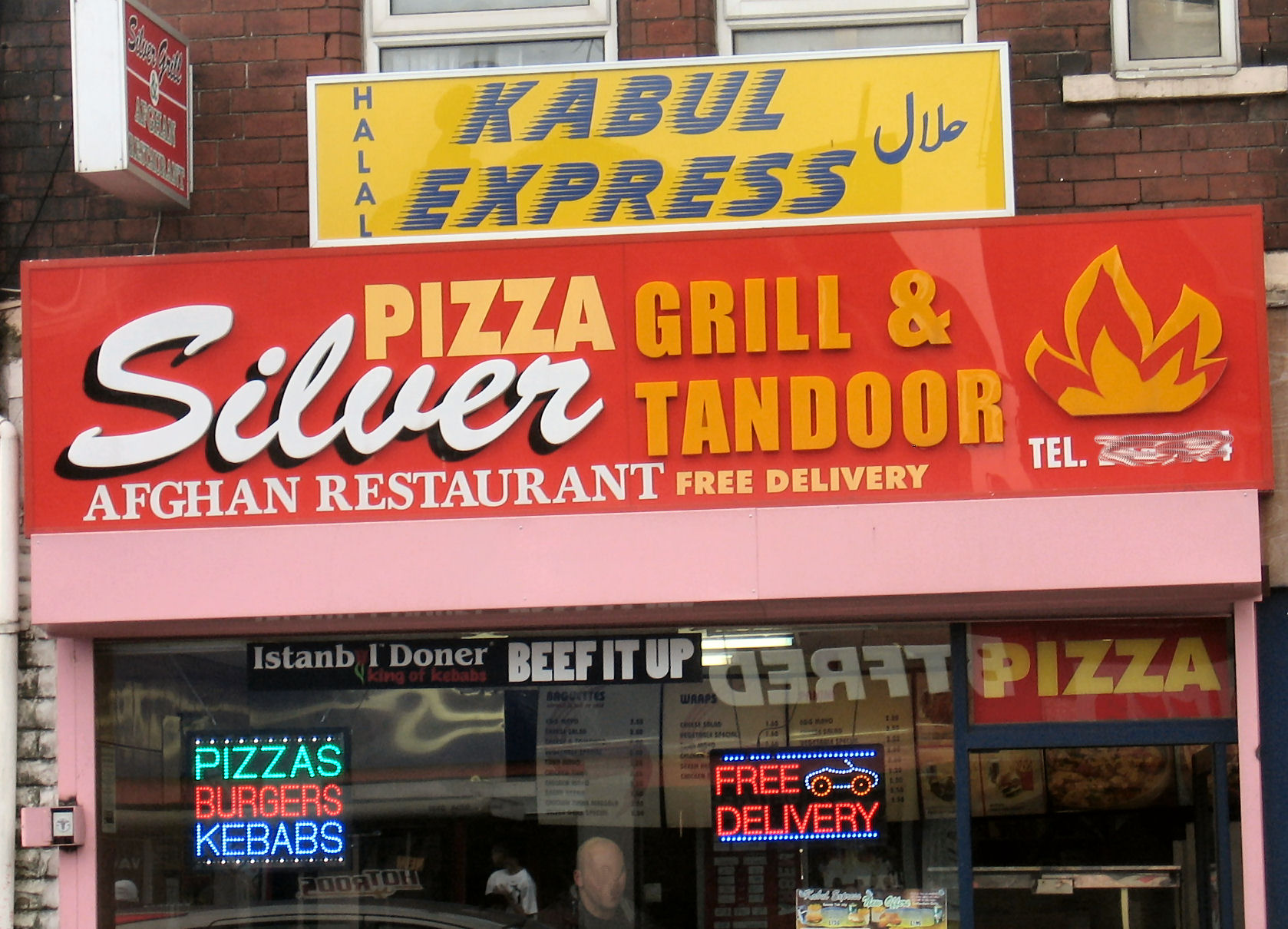
One of many fast-food shops

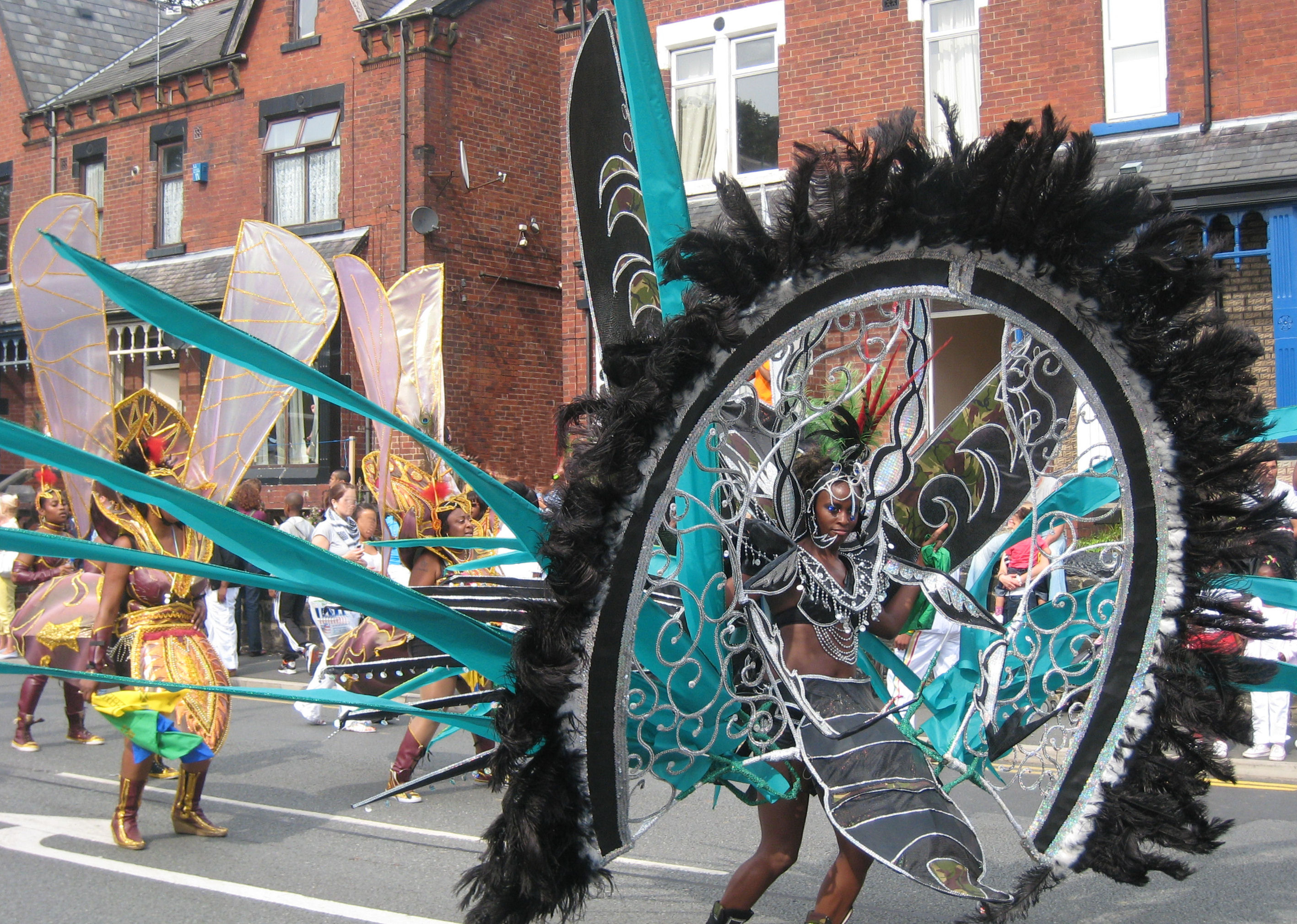
Leeds Carnival 2008

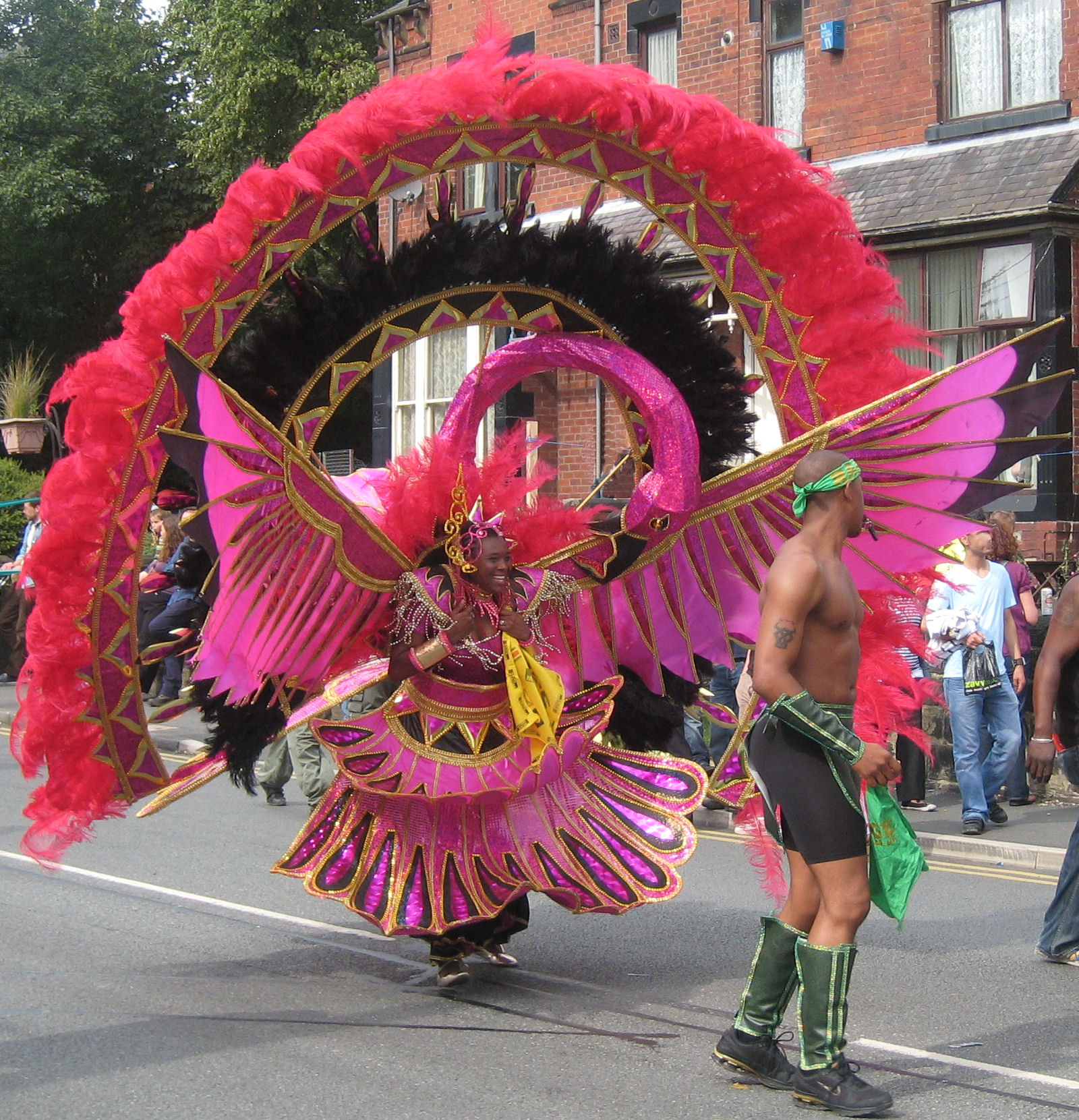
Leeds Carnival 2008

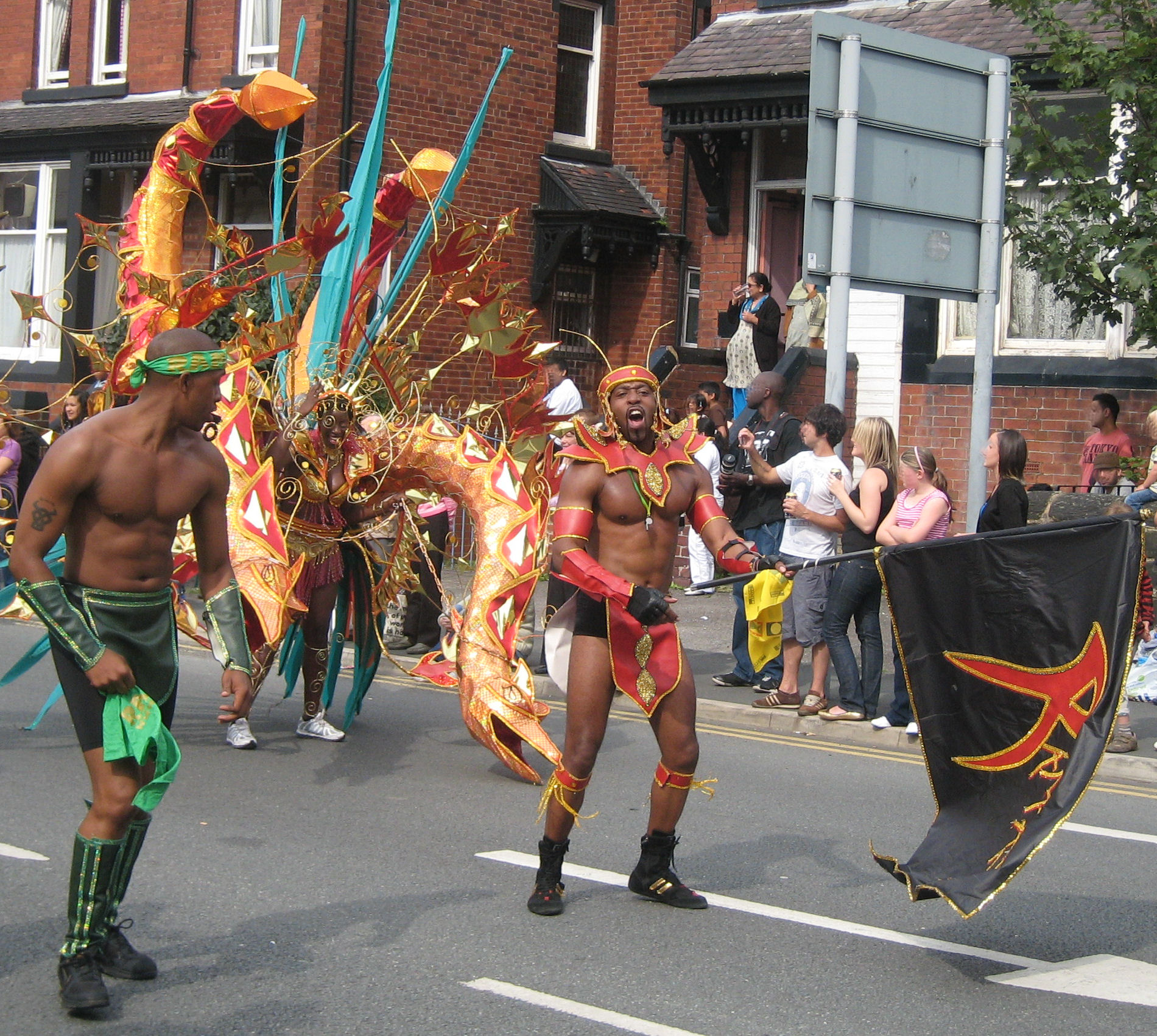
Leeds Carnival 2008

== See also ==
- Listed buildings in Leeds (Gipton and Harehills Ward)
