= Fforde Grene =

Former public house in Leeds, West Yorkshire, England

Coordinates: 53°49′03.9″N 1°30′55.3″W

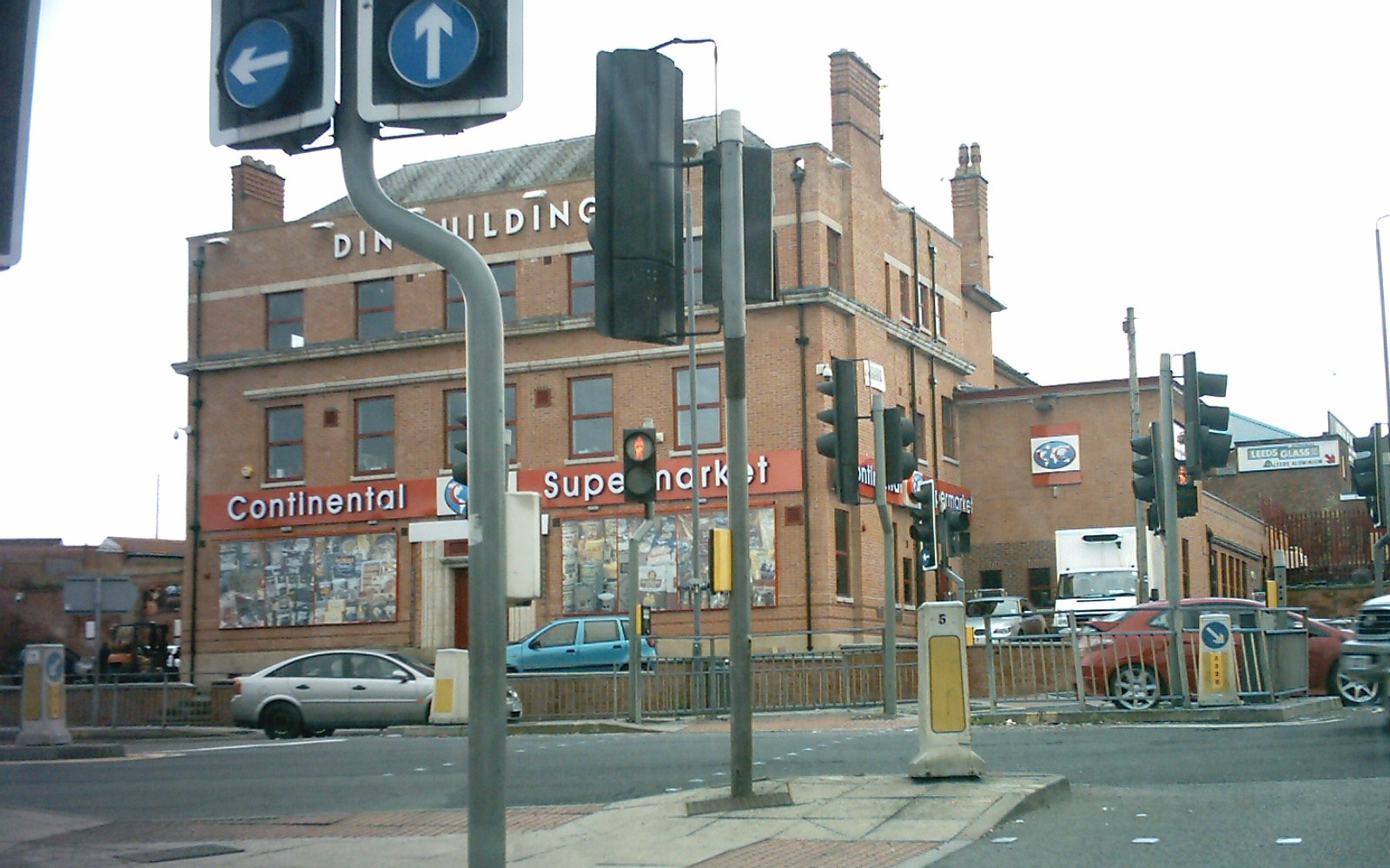
The Continental Supermarket on the A58 Roundhay Road, was formerly the Fforde Grene

The Fforde Grene was a public house and music venue located in the Harehills district of the city of Leeds, West Yorkshire, England. It is now an ethnic supermarket and online grocer, CC Continental Supermarket.

== Music venue ==
It hosted many bands before they became famous, including The Sex Pistols, U2, Simple Minds, Dire Straits, Diamond Head, Be Bop Deluxe, Def Leppard, and The Rolling Stones and artists including Bo Diddley.

Be Bop Deluxe played the venue to a packed house of fans who became incensed that the landlord would not allow an encore, resulting in a riot. The police were called to find the carpet under a sea of broken glass and the furniture smashed to matchwood. The band's gear was untouched.

Built in 1938, the pub closed its doors in July 2004 and is now one of the UK's largest ethnic supermarkets and online grocer which opened in 2007 as CC Continental Supermarket.

The patrons of Fforde Grene were an inspiration for Chumbawamba's classic "Tubthumping."

== History ==
The pub took its name from a director of Melbourne's Brewery (a forerunner of Tetleys) who could trace his ancestry back to a 13th-century relative called Richard del Fforde who lived in a house called Fford Grene.

This venue was at the busy junction of Roundhay Road and Easterly Road A58 and Harehills Lane (B6159). This junction is still named the "Fforde Grene Junction"

The name of the pub was to lend itself to a tram stop on the proposed Leeds Supertram project. This project was abandoned in 2004 owing to spiralling costs.

In 2007 it opened to the public as CC Continental Supermarket, an ethnic retail supermarket, providing fresh meat, vegetables and world foods.
