= Fotbollskanalen Europa =

Swedish television program

Fotbollskanalen Europa was a Swedish TV-program about the big football leagues in Europe. The program was broadcast on Sundays on TV4 and led by Patrick Ekwall. The program also has a Facebook page with over 50,000 members. In 2010 the program lost their rights to show Premier League.

On 18 August 2015, TV4 announced that the show had been cancelled.
