= Eilert Ekwall =

Philologist, etymologist & educator (1877–1964)

- Born: Bror Oscar Eilert Ekwall; 8 January 1877; Vallsjö Parish, Småland, Sweden
- Died: 23 November 1964 (aged 87); Lund, Sweden
- Resting place: Northern Cemetery in Lund
- Education: Uppsala University, 1894
- Spouse: Dagny Ekwall
- Relatives: Knut Ekwall (cousin)

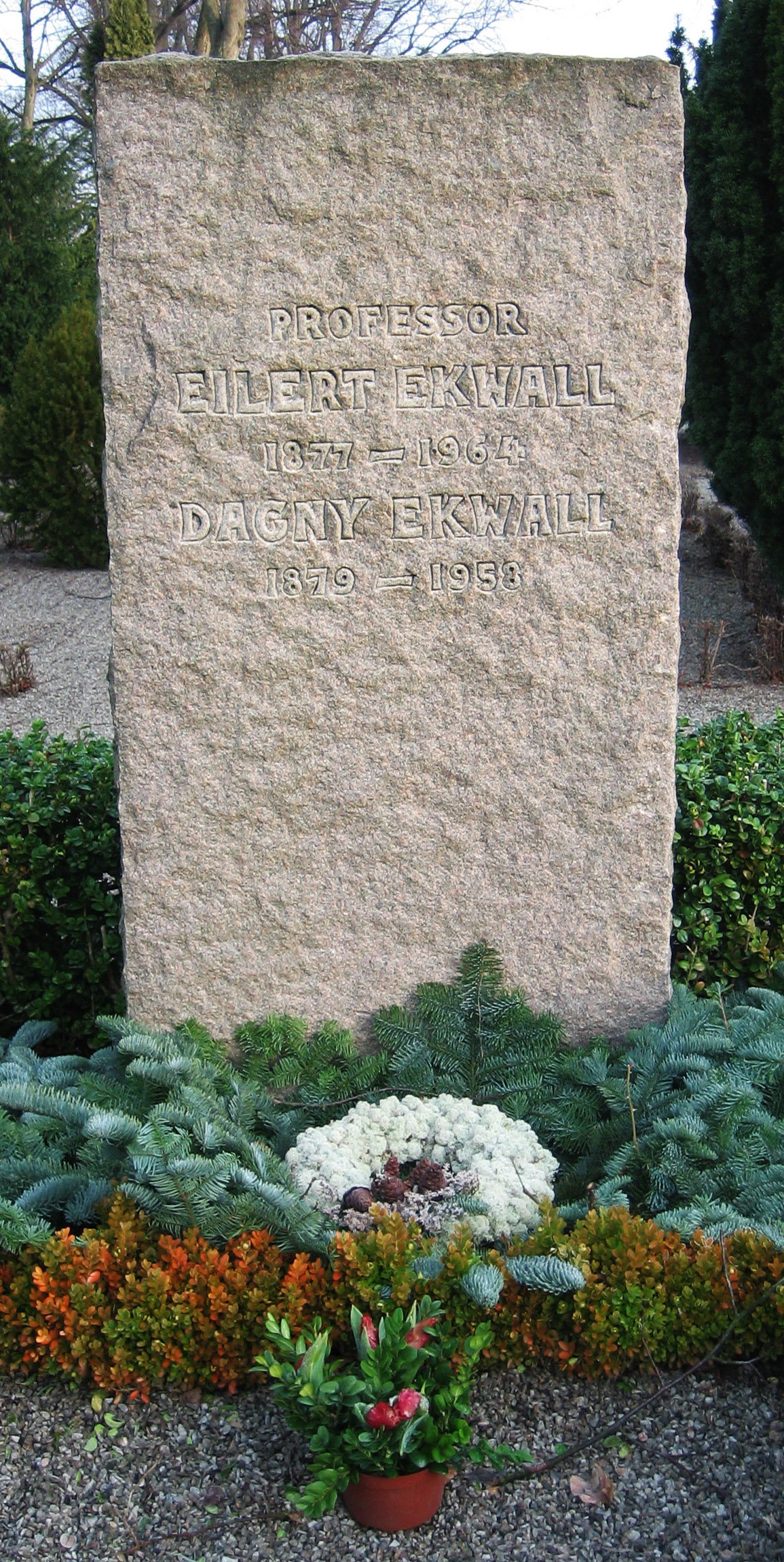
Eilert Ekwall's gravestone at the Northern Cemetery in Lund, Sweden, where he is buried with his wife Dagny.

Bror Oscar Eilert Ekwall (8 January 1877 – 23 November 1964) was a Swedish academic, Professor of English at Sweden's Lund University from 1909 to 1942 and one of the outstanding scholars of the English language in the first half of the 20th century. He wrote works on the history of English, but he is best known as the author of numerous important books on English place-names (in the broadest sense) and personal names.

== Early life and education ==
Ekwall was born on 8 January 1877 in Vallsjö Parish, Småland. Ekwall was the cousin of Knut Ekwall.

In 1894, Ekwall graduated from Uppsala University.

== Scholarly works ==
His chief works in this area are The Place-Names of Lancashire (1922), English Place-Names in -ing (1923, new edition 1961), English River Names (1928), Studies on English Place- and Personal Names (1931), Studies on English Place-Names (1936), Street-Names of the City of London (1954), Studies on the Population of Medieval London (1956), and the monumental Concise Oxford Dictionary of English Place-Names (1936, new editions 1940, 1947/51 and the last in 1960). The Dictionary remained the standard national reference resource for over 40 years, and is still valuable even though some aspects of Ekwall's methodology and some of his ideas are no longer accepted. Although not a county editor of the survey conducted by the English Place-Name Society (1923-date), his philological advice was often sought and acknowledged by scholars preparing the county volumes, such as Allen Mawer and Frank Stenton. He was competent not only in English philology, but also in Scandinavian and Celtic, making him ideally qualified as an authority on linguistic aspects of the place-names of England.

His other work on English included scholarly editions of classic early-modern works such as John Jones' Practical Phonography of 1701 (1907), the anonymous Writing Scholar's Companion of 1695 (1911), and John Lydgate's Siege of Thebes (1930). Notable other books or booklets were that on modern English phonology and morphology originally published in German in 1914, and still being reprinted in 1965 (English edition finally after Ekwall's death, in 1975); and that on the genitive of groups, with much relevance for place-name studies (1943).

Ekwall also left behind an extensive body of influential academic articles and notes (many collected in the books of 1931 and 1936 mentioned above), local working papers of Lund University, and a very large number of book reviews, all published over a period of some 60 years, in English, Swedish and German, and mostly referenced in von Feilitzen's bibliography.

From 1935, Ekwall was a Fellow of the Swedish Academy of Letters and the Swedish Academy of Sciences. He and his wife Dagny founded a bursary for students at Lund University from the Småland region.

== Personal life ==
In 1908, Ekwall married Dagny Ekwall (née Schmidt-Nielsen; 1879–1958).

Ekwall died in Lund on 23 November 1964, aged 87.

== Further reading (not mentioned above) ==
- Ekwall, Eilert (1924) "The Celtic element" and "The Scandinavian element", in A. Mawer and F. M. Stenton, eds, Introduction to the Survey [of English Place-Names]. Cambridge: Cambridge University Press (English Place-Name Survey vol. 1, part 1, pp. 15–35 and 55–92).
- von Feilitzen, Olof (1961) The Published Writings of Eilert Ekwall: a Bibliography. Lund: C.W.K. Gleerup WorldCat catalogue record.
