= Emma Ekwall =

Swedish artist (1838–1925)

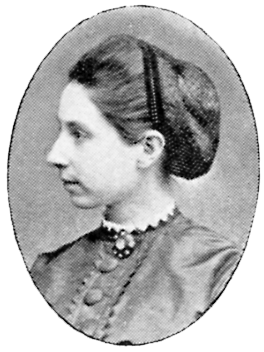
Emma Ekwall (1838–1925)

Emma Amalia Ekwall (18 January 1838 – 1 February 1925) was a Swedish painter.

== Life and career ==
Born in Gransbo, Småland, she was the daughter of the official Nils Fredrik Ekvall and Emelie Bernhardina Carolina Djurström and the sister of Knut, Gustaf, and Hugo Ekwall.

Ekwall studied at the Royal Swedish Academy of Fine Arts, Stockholm between 1865 and 1871. The latter year also saw her become the first woman to receive a royal medal. After her studies, she went abroad, spending time in Munich and Leipzig. She most notably painted portraits, as well as flowers and children, some of which are on display at Nationalmuseum.

In 1925, Ekwall died in Stockholm, at the age of 87.

== Gallery ==
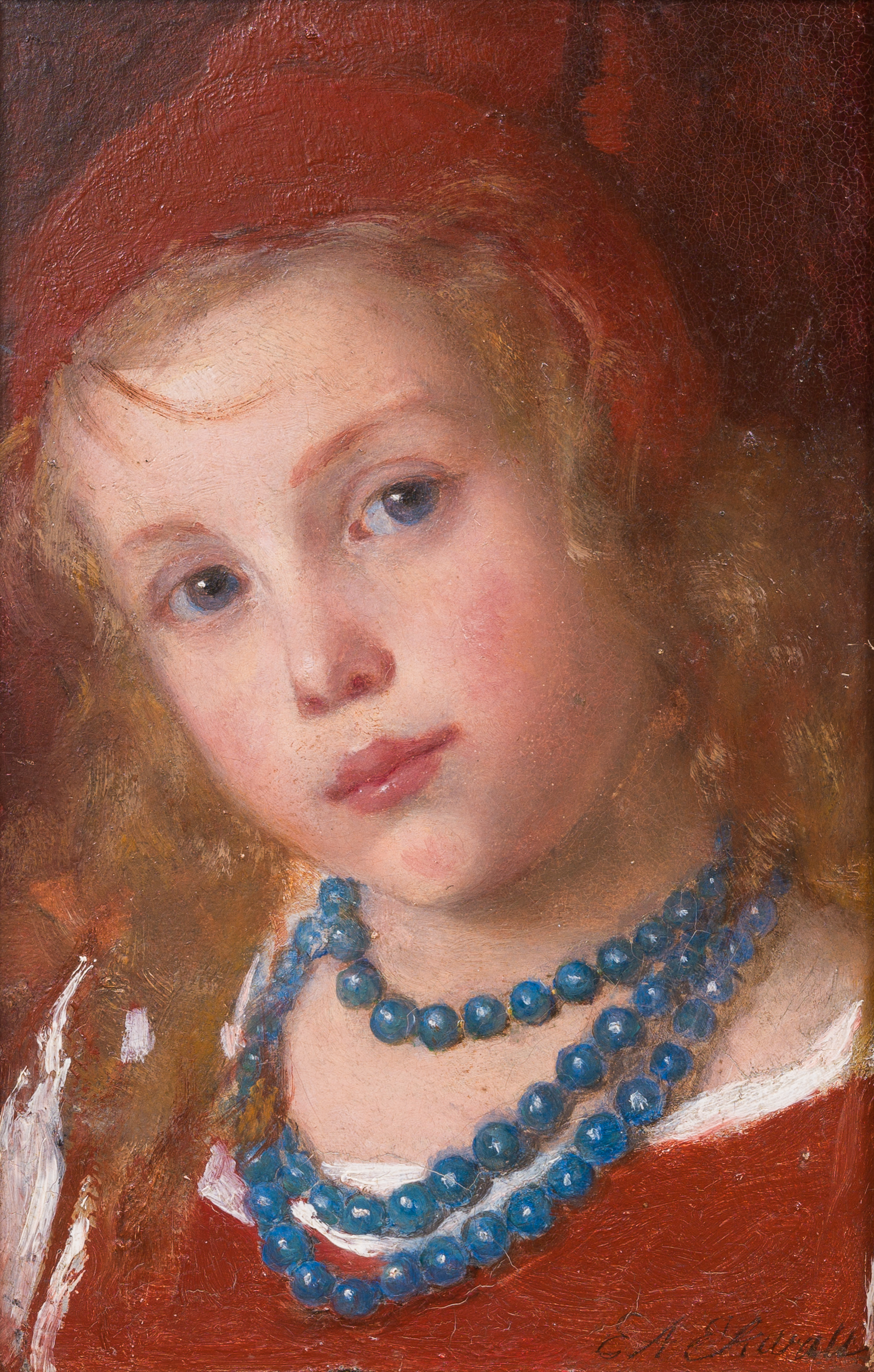
The Girl With Blue Necklace

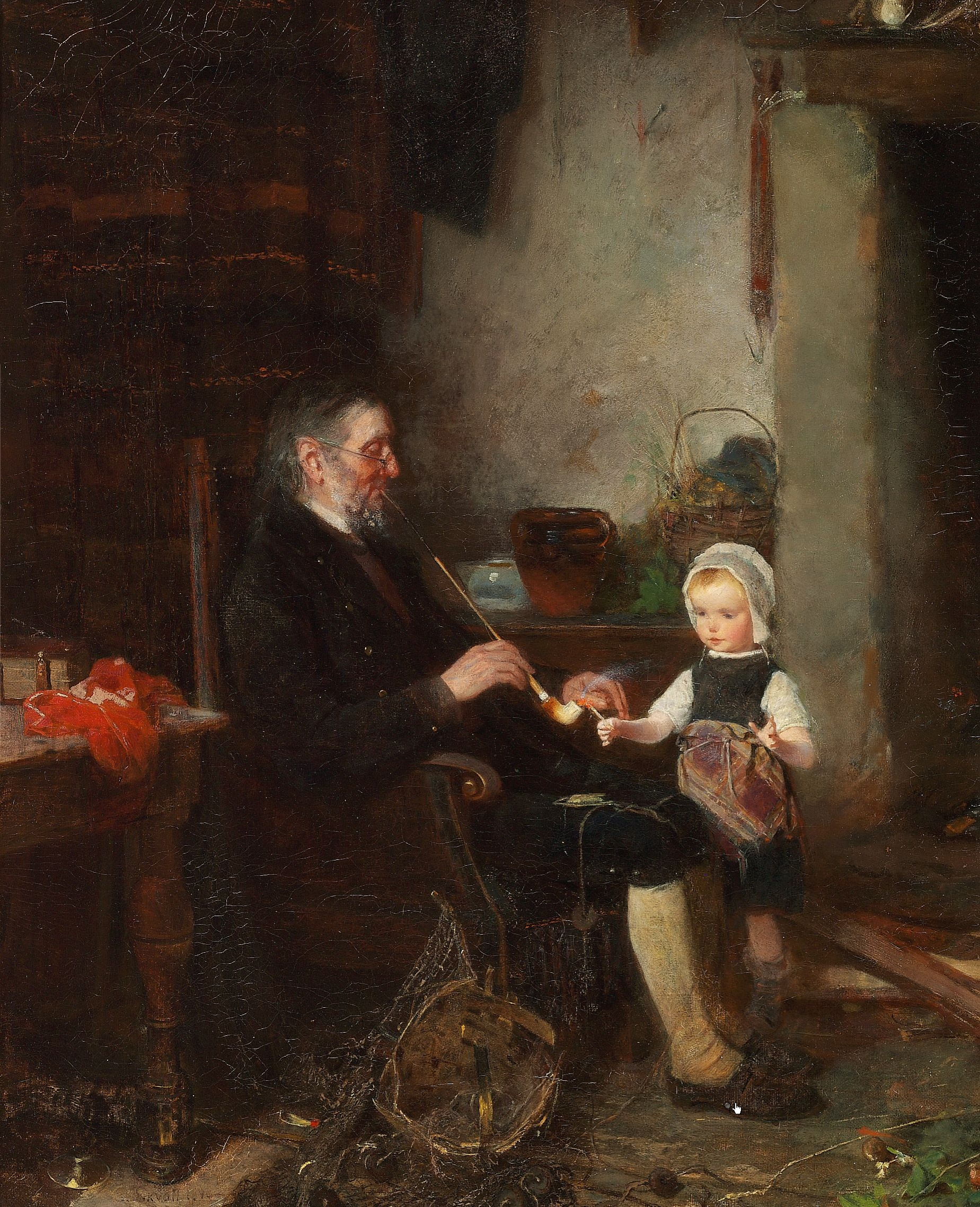
Lighting the pipe, 1890

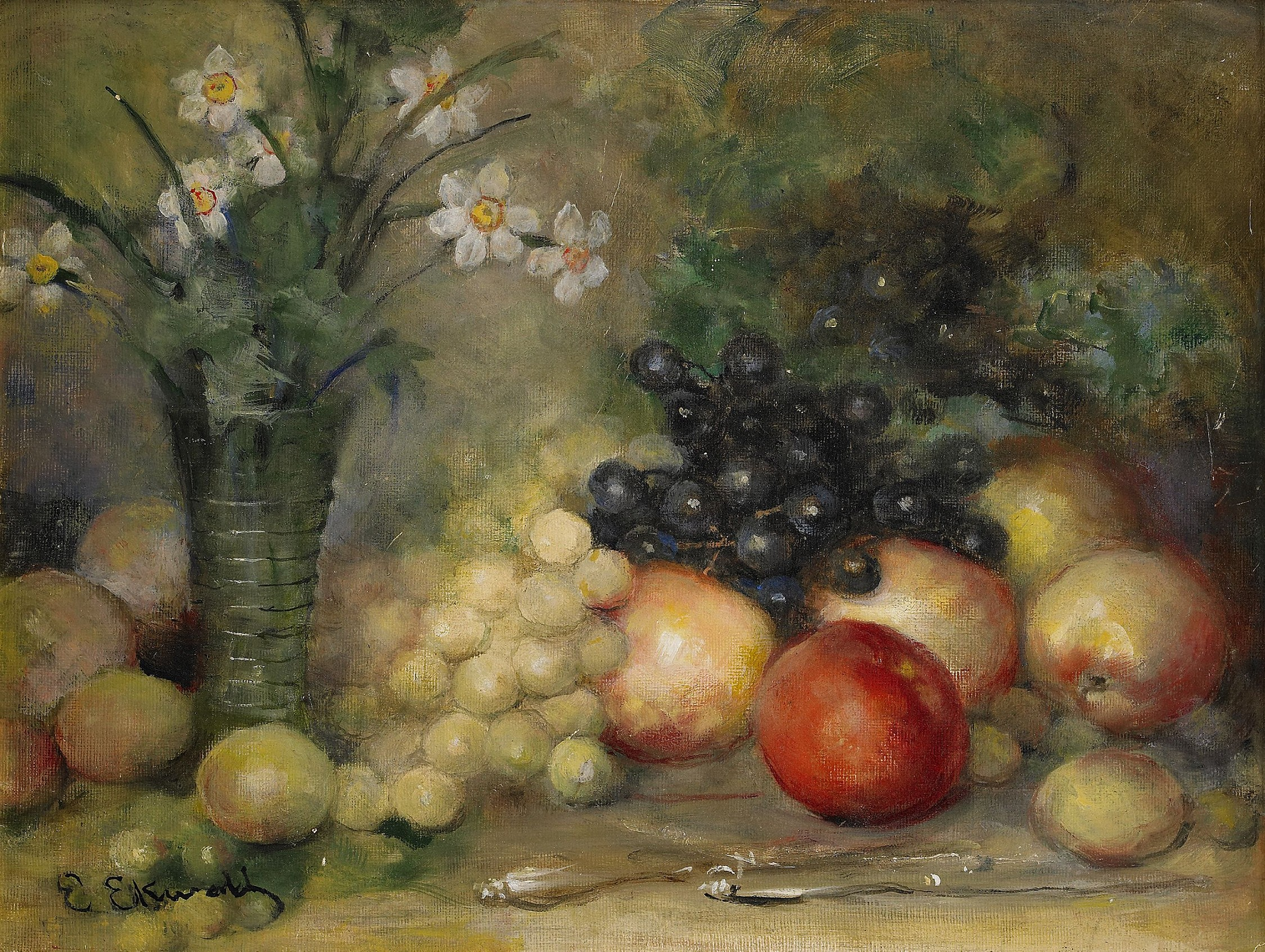
Still life with fruit

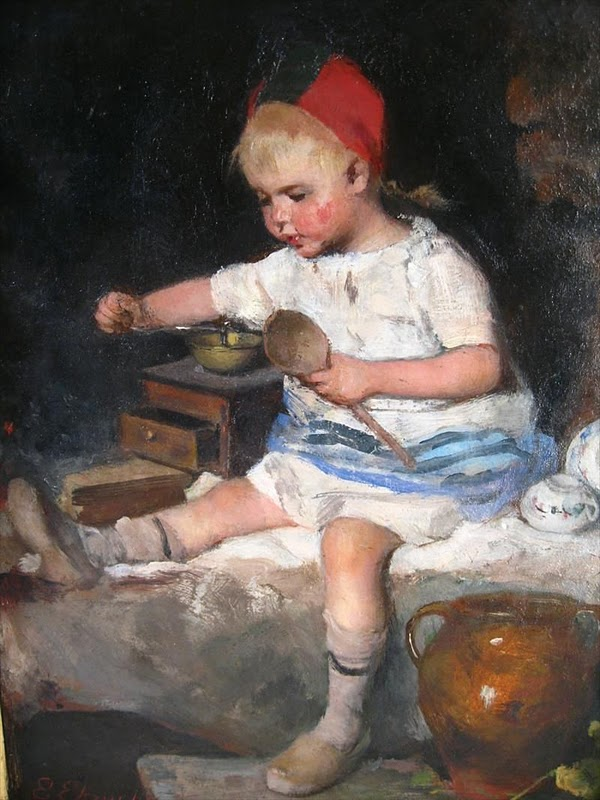
Young girl with wooden spoon and coffee mill
