= Patrick Ekwall =

Swedish sports journalist

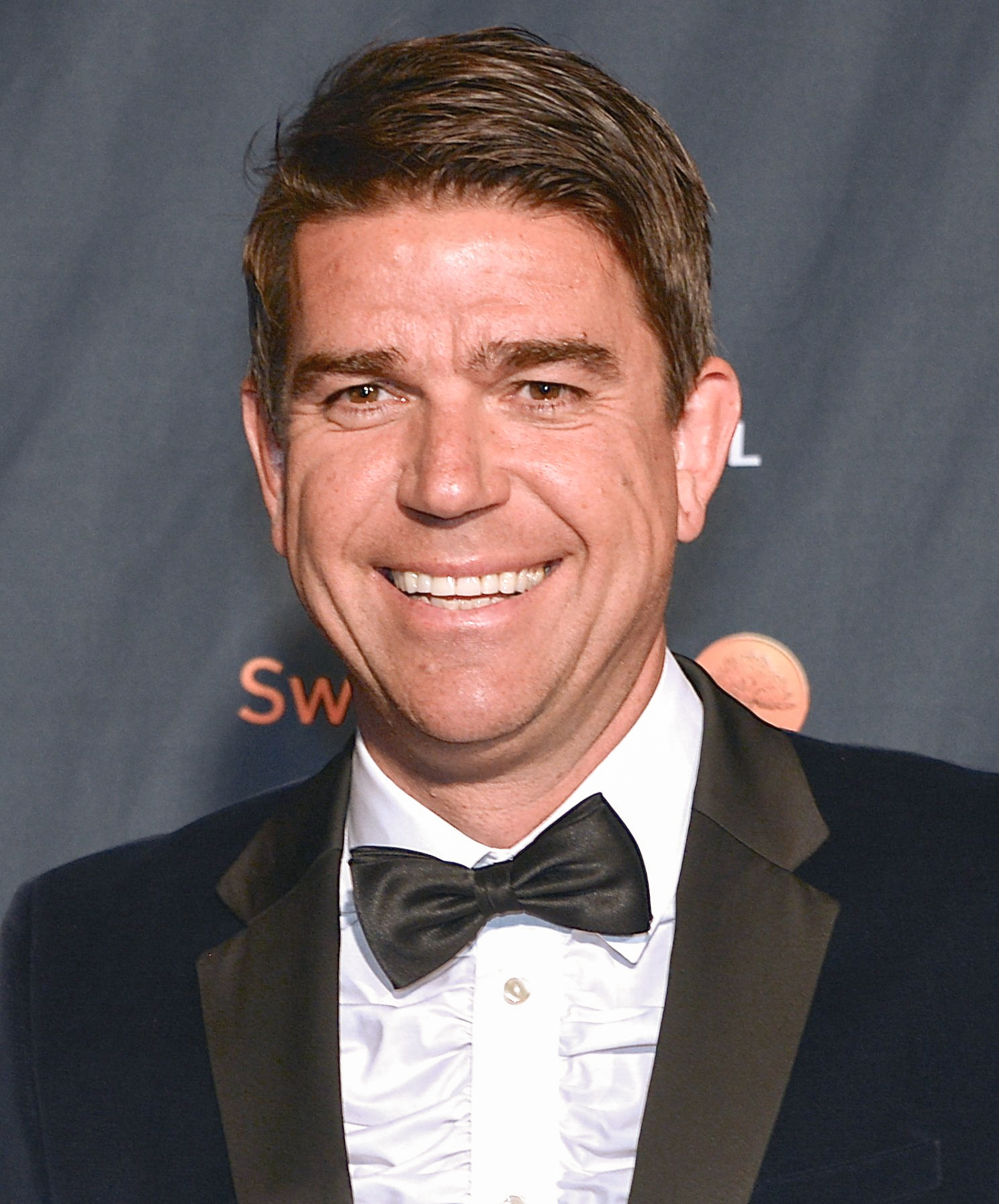
- Ekwall in 2013
- Born: 16 July 1965 (age 59); Landskrona, Sweden

Patrick Ekwall (born 16 July 1965) is a Swedish sports journalist.

== Biography ==
He grew up with his mother in Landskrona. His parents got divorced.

Ekwall is a reporter and commentator for TV4 sports department. He covers athletics events, and he also makes the channels sports reviews for the late sportnews. He presents the sports shows "Fotbollskanalen Europa" and "Ekwall vs Lundh".

He participated in the celebrity dance show Let's Dance 2007 which was broadcast on TV4, dancing with Carin da Silva.

Ekwall has written a book about the footballer Martin Dahlin. He has also released detective fiction.
