= Knut Ekwall =

German painter

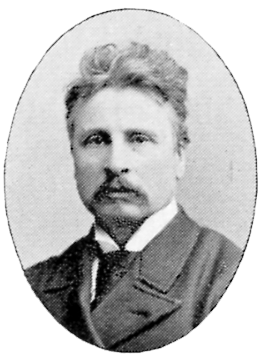
Knut Ekwall, from the Svenskt Porträttgalleri XX

Knut Alfred Ekwall (3 April 1843 – 16 April 1912) was a Swedish painter and illustrator. He is best known for his genre works, many of which have women and children for their subjects.

== Biography ==
He was born in Säby Parish (now Tranås), Småland. His father was a bailiff for the Crown Enforcement Authority. His talents were noticed by Marcus Larson who offered him space in his studio in 1858. The studio burnt down, but he was still able to study with Larson then, on that basis, gain admission to the Royal Swedish Academy of Fine Arts, where he studied from 1860 to 1866, with an emphasis on woodcutting. After graduating, he was employed as a cartoonist by the Ny illustrerad Tidning. Thanks to financial support from Count Gustaf Trolle-Bonde, he was able to study in Germany. he was a student of Ludwig Knaus in Berlin.

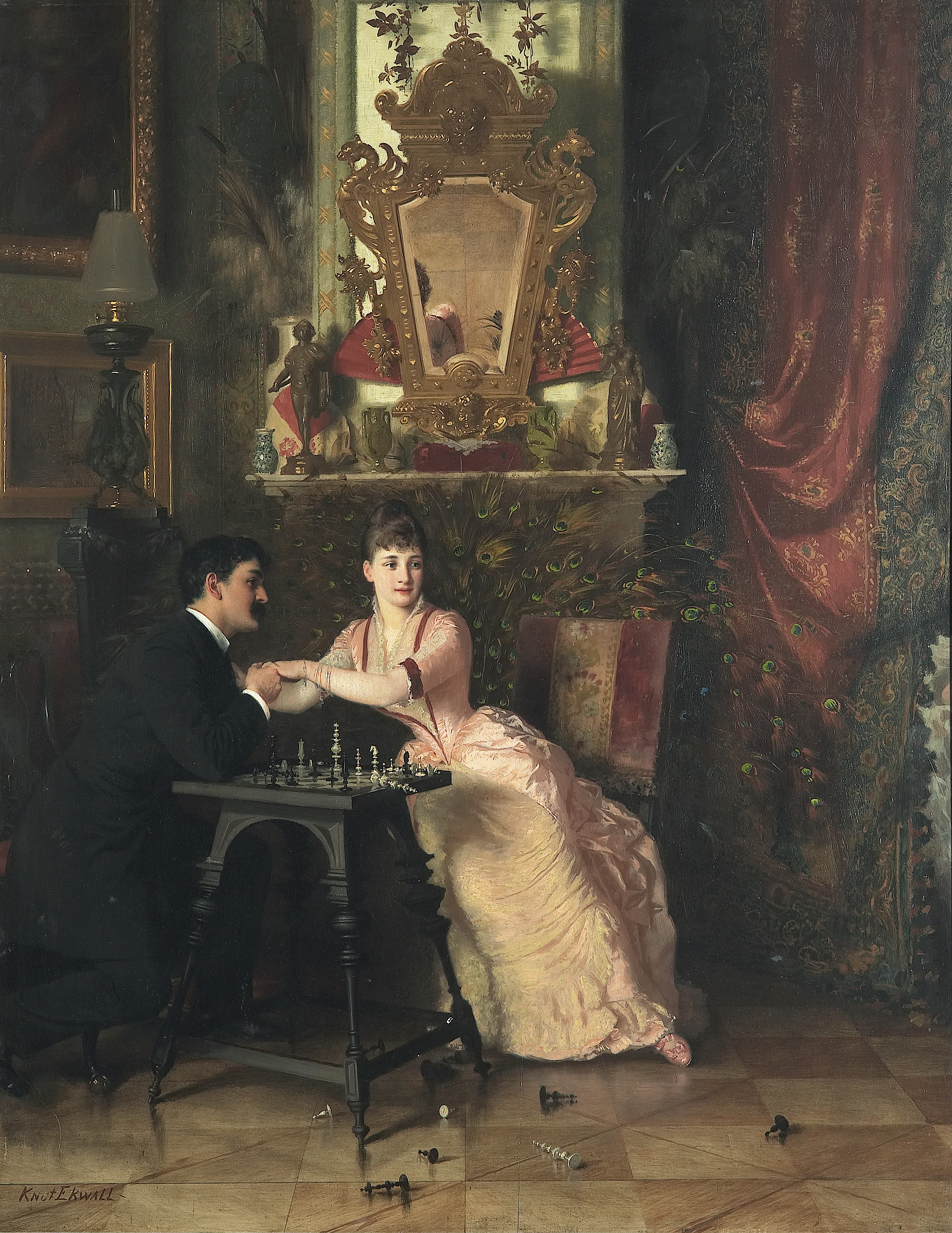
The Proposal (1880s)

In 1870, he worked as an artist in Munich, then moved to Leipzig, where he worked for the Illustrirte Zeitung. In 1871, he married the opera singer, Johanna Maria Theresia Burkowitz-Pönitz (1851–1933), and decided to stay in Germany. In 1876, they moved to Berlin, where he studied with the famous portrait and genre painter, Ludwig Knaus. While there, he continued his work as an illustrator, for several publications, including Die Gartenlaube. He also provided illustrations for the epic poem Frithiofs saga, translated by Esaias Tegnér.

He and Johanna returned to Sweden in 1885, with their seven children, and settled into a home he had designed himself, on the shores of Lake Sommen. Although he held no official position, the locals called him "Professor". He travelled constantly, however, arranging exhibitions. During his absences, Johanna gave music lessons to the children. Five of them became known as the Ekwallska Kvintetten and toured throughout the area. In 1890, they had another daughter, Runa, who became a sculptor.

In 1912, his home at Lake Sommen burned down. Most of his work and personal papers were lost. He had been lying in his bedroom, ill, for some time, but was rescued and taken to the nearby Romanäs sanatorium. A few weeks later, he died there.

His works may be seen at the Nationalmuseum and the Nordiska museet.

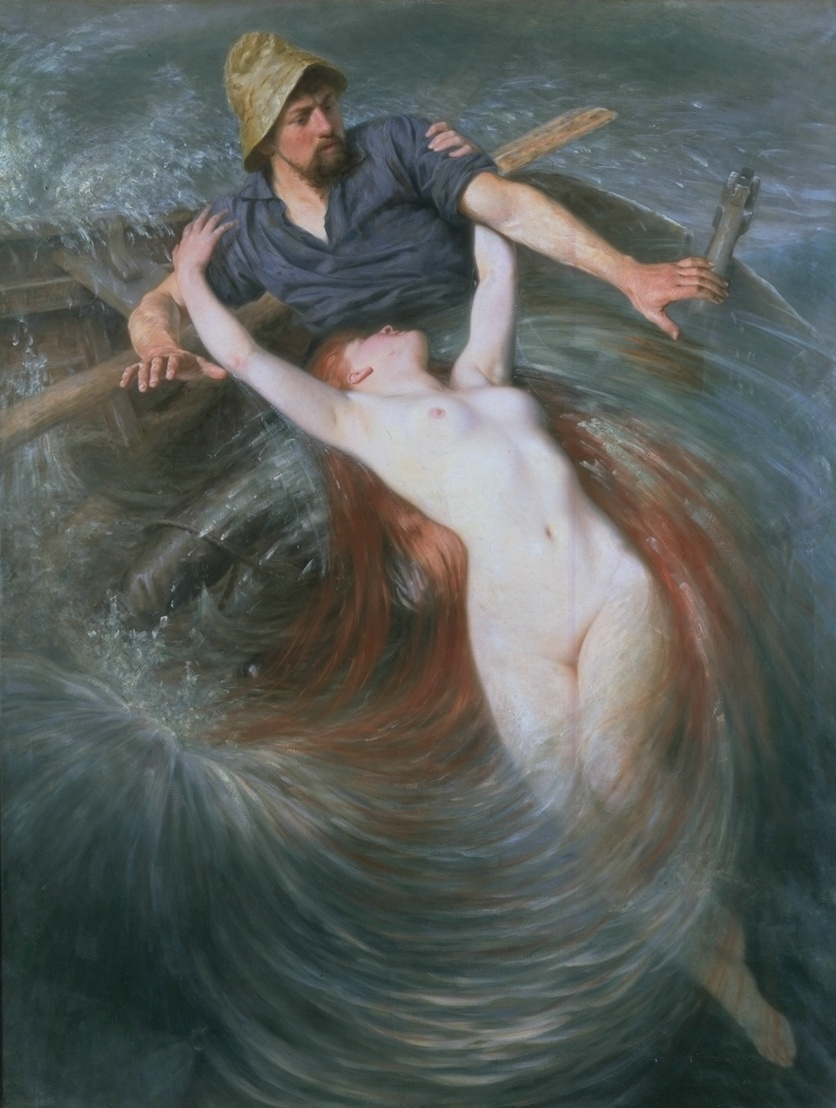
The Fisherman and the Siren

His sister, Emma, also became an artist. His brothers, Gustaf (1858–1920) and Hugo (1854–?) both became metal engravers.

== Other sources ==
- Biography @ the Svenskt Biografiskt Lexikon
- Biography from the Nordisk Familjebok @ Project Runeberg
- Vital statistics @ Lexikonett Amanda
