= Uneasy Listening (Chumbawamba album) =

Compilation album by Chumbawamba
- Released: 1998
- Recorded: 1986–1998
- Genre: Anarcho-punk, pop
- Length: 74:38
- Label: EMI (UK)

Chumbawamba chronology
Tubthumper (1997)	Uneasy Listening (1998)	The ABCs of Anarchism (1999)

Uneasy Listening is a compilation album by anarcho-punk band Chumbawamba. It contains songs from the time of their first album Pictures of Starving Children Sell Records up to 1998.

== Release ==
The album was released in the United States in 1998, to expose American audiences to the group's music before "Tubthumping", as their preceding studio albums had received only a limited stateside release and the record labels were being uncooperative with regards to the group's preceding albums there. The album compiles songs from the group's pre-Tubthumper albums, from Pictures of Starving Children Sell Records to Swingin' with Raymond, although the majority of the songs are from the group's two preceding albums, Anarchy and Swingin' with Raymond. However, the album contains one previously unreleased song, "We Don't Go to God's House Anymore", which is based on a tune derived from the Alabama 3 song "U Don't Danse 2 Tekno Anymore".

The cover photograph depicts Buenaventura Durruti, an anarchist soldier and revolutionary who died fighting fascists in Spain in 1936.

The album was initially released in 1998 as a German import, although it was re-released in 1999 and 2001 by EMI Music Distribution.

== Critical reception ==
Professional ratings
Review scores
Source	Rating
AllMusic	4/5 stars
Robert Christgau	A−
The Rolling Stone Album Guide	3.5/5 stars

The album elicited highly favourable reviews upon its release. Music critic Robert Christgau gave the album a grade of an "A−" and praised the album as "funny", opining that the collection also demonstrates that their music was "catchy" long before "Tubthumping" and noting that "the notes (in the booklet) are worth reading". AllMusic awarded the album four out of five stars and praised the collection's inclusion of "Ugh! Your Ugly Houses", also commenting that "if you don't have the studio albums, this is the best place to start." In The Rolling Stone Album Guide, the album holds a score of three and a half stars; critic Douglas Wolk felt that the album contains the group's "angriest", "funniest", and "most tuneful" songs in the group's repertoire, singling out the lyric "Nothing ever burns down by itself/Every fire needs a little bit of help" as the single best line on the record.

== Track listing ==
All tracks written and produced by Chumbawamba except where noted.

#	Title	Length	Original album	Year	Notes
1	"...And in a Nutshell"	1:16	Pictures of Starving Children Sell Records	1986	
2	"Mouthful of Shit"	3:38	Anarchy	1994	
3	"Behave"	4:14	"(Someone's Always Telling You How To) Behave" single	1992	
4	"Timebomb"	4:08	Anarchy	1994	Single remix
5	"Morality Play in Three Acts"	4:06	"Homophobia" single	1994	
6	"Enough Is Enough"	4:35	Anarchy	1993	Written and performed by Chumbawamba & Credit to the Nation
7	"On Being Pushed"	0:30	Anarchy	1994	
8	"Hanging on the Old Barbed Wire"	2:02	English Rebel Songs 1381-1914	1988	
9	"Ugh! Your Ugly Houses!"	2:19	Swingin' with Raymond	1995	
10	"Look! No Strings!"	5:00	Shhh	1992	
11	"Big Mouth Strikes Again"	5:34	Shhh	1992	
12	"This Girl"	3:42	Swingin' with Raymond	1995	
13	"Smash Clause 29!"	4:46	"Smash Clause 28! Fight the Alton Bill!" single	1988	
14	"Georgina"	2:24	Anarchy	1994	
15	"Waiting, Shouting"	2:55	Swingin' with Raymond	1995	
16	"Song of the Mother in Debt..."	6:10	Pox Upon the Poll Tax compilation	1989	
17	"On the Day the Nazi Died"	1:20	"Homophobia" single	1994	Previously unreleased live version
18	"Give the Anarchist a Cigarette"	4:00	Anarchy	1994	
19	"Nothing Knocks Me Over"	3:04	Portraits of Anarchists EP	1996	
20a	"We Don't Go to God's House Anymore"	8:55	Previously unreleased	1998	Written by Chumbawamba and Alabama 3
20b	"Harry's Ambient Mantra" (excerpt)	(n/a)	"Hat Trick for Harry" unreleased EP	1993	Hidden track. A brief portion of an otherwise unreleased ten-minute remix of "Happiness Is Just a Chant Away".
