= Get On with It =

Live album by Chumbawamba
- Released: 2006
- Recorded: 2006
- Genres: Anarcho punk, pop, folk
- Length: 47:50
- Producer: Chumbawamba

Chumbawamba chronology
A Singsong and a Scrap (2005)	Get On with It (2006)	The Boy Bands Have Won (2008)

Professional ratings
Review scores
Source	Rating
Allmusic	link

Get On with It is a live album by British anarchist punk band Chumbawamba released in 2006. It features recordings made at shows throughout England in 2006, covering songs from all throughout their musical career.

The songs "Timebomb", "Homophobia" and "Stitch That/A Stitch in Time" were also on their 1994 live album Showbusiness!

Vocal group Coope, Boyes & Simpson are featured. Their songs were previously sampled by Chumbawamba on the album Readymades and they contributed vocals to the previous album A Singsong and a Scrap. They are also label mates on No Masters Records.

== Track listing ==
All songs are written and arranged by Chumbawamba, except where noted.

#	Song name	Length	Original Album	Notes
1	"Buy Nothing Day"	3:26	Un	About Buy Nothing Day
2	"A Stitch in Time"	2:39	Shhh	Written by Mike Waterson & Martin Carthy (uncredited), arranged by Chumbawamba; A faster rock version called "Stitch That" was on Shhh and Showbusiness!
3	"Song on the Times"	2:42	English Rebel Songs 1381-1984	Traditional, arranged by Chumbawamba
4	"Hard Times of Old England"	2:11	N/A	Originally by folk group The Copper Family, arranged by Chumbawamba
5	"By & By"	4:29	A Singsong and a Scrap	
6	"Jacob's Ladder (Not In My Name)"	4:21	Readymades	Written by Chumbawamba & Davey Graham
7	"Timebomb"	3:19	Anarchy	
8	"Homophobia"	2:07	Anarchy	
9	"William Francis"	4:43	A Singsong and a Scrap	
10	"Learning to Love"	3:16	A Singsong and a Scrap	
11	"The Diggers' Song"	2:27	English Rebel Songs 1381-1984	Traditional, arranged by Chumbawamba
12	"On eBay"	4:42	Un	
13	"Hanging on the Old Barbed Wire"	2:31	English Rebel Songs 1381-1984	Featuring vocals by Coope, Boyes & Simpson; Traditional, arranged by Chumbawamba
14	"Bella Ciao"	4:48	A Singsong and a Scrap	Traditional, arranged by Chumbawamba
15	"Walking into Battle with the Lord"	3:02	A Singsong and a Scrap	Bonus track on some editions
16	"Rich Pop Stars"	2:06	N/A	Bonus track on some editions

== Personnel ==
- Boff Whalley
- Jude Abbott
- Lou Watts
- Neil Ferguson

with

- Phil 'Crikey!' Moody – Accordion
- Richard 'Why Not?' Ormrod – Accordion
- Coope, Boyes & Simpson – vocals on 13
