= The ABCs of Anarchism =

EP by Negativland and Chumbawamba
- Released: April 27, 1999
- Genre: Anarcho punk, experimental, sound collage
- Length: 21:11
- Label: Seeland
- Producer: Negativland; Chumbawamba

Negativland chronology
Happy Heroes (1998)	The ABCs of Anarchism (1999)	These Guys Are From England and Who Gives a Shit (2001)

Chumbawamba chronology
Uneasy Listening (1998)	The ABCs of Anarchism (1999)	WYSIWYG (2000)

The ABCs of Anarchism is an EP by American electronic group Negativland and British rock band Chumbawamba. A three-track collection, it incorporates samples of songs from Chumbawamba's Tubthumper (1997) as well as music by the then-current artists including Ice Cube and the Spice Girls, and television shows such as M*A*S*H and Teletubbies. The release's lyrics focus on political theory and children's media.

The EP was released on April 27, 1999, by Seeland Records. It elicited generally favorable response from critics, who commended the collaboration between the two groups as well as their social commentary and sampling. It also received play on some American college radio stations, appearing on multiple radio playlists compiled by CMJ New Music Monthly.

== Composition ==
The EP, whose name is taken from the 1929 Alexander Berkman book of the same name, makes extensive use of sampling of pop songs and themes from movies and TV. The EP's overall effect has been described as sounding like "Rauschenberg-like musical collages". Lyrically, it focuses on children's media as well as political theory, and criticizes PBS, the BBC, WWF (since renamed the WWE), Noam Chomsky, George Bush, and Doris Lessing.

Negativland described the 13-minute long title track as a "simultaneously informative and confused trolley tour through the backlot of an often misunderstood political point of view". It includes loops of songs by Chumbawamba, interspersed with samples of music by the Spice Girls, the Sex Pistols, Ice Cube, James Brown, and Elvis Costello, in addition to samples from film and television (including M*A*S*H* and the children's television show Teletubbies). It also samples Chumbawamba's hit "Tubthumping" and combines it with a sample of Chic's "Good Times". The second track, "Smelly Water", discusses the issue of water pollution and extensively samples Chumbawamba's "Drip Drip Drip", from their 1997 album Tubthumper. "© Is for Stupid" is an adaptation by Jonathan Land (“DJ Dr. J Land”, a member of Negativland at the time) of the title track and includes samples of the Cookie Monster (from Sesame Street), Tinky Winky (from Teletubbies), and American rapper Ice Cube; it has been described as an "electro track" that is "slightly more coherent" than the original version.

== Release ==
Beginning in April 1999, copies of the album were available through mail order; the official release date was initially announced as May 23, 1999. The album was ultimately released by Seeland Records on April 27, 1999, in both compact disc and digital formats. The title track was also made available as a free digital download on Chumbawamba's website, Chumba.com. Physical copies of the album included a mock children's storybook as an album booklet.

== Reception ==
=== Critical ===
Professional ratings
Review scores
Source	Rating
Allmusic	3/5 stars
Austin Chronicle	4/5 stars

The EP was favorably reviewed by the Austin Chronicle, whose critic Kate Messer awarded the release four stars and wrote that Negativland "tubthump sampled Teletubbie tunes and those of millionaire anarchists Chumbawamba"; Messer also deemed the release superior to, but not wholly dissimilar from, the soundtrack for Teletubbies. A review in the Orlando Weekly concluded that the album was unlikely to persuade listeners on political matters, but that "it's fun to hear the band try"; the review also argued that the album's title was not representative of its subject matter, and that the list of artists and media sampled in the release "seems more interesting than it actually sounds on record". Heather Phares, writing for Allmusic, awarded the EP three stars and wrote that the album highlighted the "common ground" between two politically radical groups, one of whom was commercially successful.

=== Commercial ===
The album found some success on college radio stations: it debuted at number 22 on the CMJ New Music Monthly "Core Radio" tally, based on the playlists of 65 "influential" American college radio stations. It also attained a peak of number 43 on the CMJ Radio 200, based on the playlists of 306 American college radio stations.

== Track listing ==
No.	Title	Length
1.	"The ABCs of Anarchism"	12:50
2.	"Smelly Water"	5:35
3.	"© Is for Stupid"	2:46
Total length:		21:11

== See also ==
- Anarchism and the arts
- Anarcho-punk
- Punk ideology
