= WYSIWYG (album) =

Studio album by Chumbawamba
- Released: 4 April 2000
- Recorded: 1999
- Studio: Shabby Road Studios (Pudsey); Woodlands Studio (Castleford); The Chapel Studios (Lincolnshire)
- Genre: Pop; dance-pop; alternative rock; experimental; sound collage
- Length: 47:48
- Label: EMI; Universal; Republic
- Producer: Chumbawamba; Neil Ferguson

Chumbawamba chronology
The ABCs of Anarchism (1999)	WYSIWYG (2000)	Readymades (2002)

Singles from WYSIWYG
- 1. "She's Got All the Friends That Money Can Buy" Released: 29 February 2000

WYSIWYG (an abbreviation of What You See Is What You Get) is the ninth studio album by English rock band Chumbawamba, released on 4 April 2000 by EMI. The album was written and produced by Chumbawamba (excluding a cover of the Bee Gees' "New York Mining Disaster 1941"), with additional production by Neil Ferguson. Originally a continuation of the sound of predecessor Tubthumper (1997), the group scrapped the material from the album's initial recording sessions and sought to explore new sounds with WYSIWYG. The album incorporates elements of pop, dance-pop, alternative rock, and experimental music. Thematically, the album explores various aspects of pop culture that the group had been exposed to due to the success of their 1997 single "Tubthumping". WYSIWYG was promoted with one single: "She's Got All the Friends That Money Can Buy".

WYSIWYG received polarized reviews from music critics. Some music critics praised the album's catchy hooks and references to pop culture, while others criticized the album for being dull and lacking cohesion. The album was met with some controversy due to the song "Passenger List for Doomed Flight #1721", a B-side to "She's Got All the Friends That Money Can Buy" and bonus track on the album, in which the group names off prominent public figures that they wish would disappear on an astray flight. In a stark contrast to Tubthumper, the album failed to attain any notable commercial success, failing to chart on any major music charts. Following the commercial failure of WYSIWYG, Chumbawamba parted ways with EMI in 2001.

== Recording ==
About 8 months after the release of Tubthumper, Chumbawamba returned to the studio to work on a follow-up record. They recorded a full 10-song album, but decided it was too similar to its predecessor, so they scrapped it and started over.

== Critical reception ==
Professional ratings
Review scores
Source	Rating
AllMusic	4/5 stars
The Encyclopedia of Popular Music	3/5 stars
Entertainment Weekly	B+
Lincoln Journal-Star	4/5 stars
Los Angeles Times	3/4 stars
MTV Asia	7/10
Rolling Stone	1.5/5 stars
The Village Voice	A−
Wall of Sound	71/100

The album was subject to polarized reviews from music critics upon its release. Some critics were extremely positive regarding the album. Robert Christgau awarded the album an "A−" and praised it as "an unslackening stream of infectious invective and simplistic satire," going on to praise "Hey Hey We're the Junkies". AllMusic's Stephen Thomas Erlewine also praised the album, giving it 4 stars and felt that although the album didn't contain any obvious hit singles and was rather short, concluding that the record "delivers far more than anyone could have expected, especially anyone that considered the group one-hit wonders."

Some critics' feelings regarding the album were more mixed. MTV Asia gave the album 7 out of 10 and commented that the album was "very different" from its predecessor, going on to question the album's subtlety but concluding that the album demonstrates great range, positing that "all the eccentricities of the album, however, are offset by sweet melodies." Entertainment Weekly, though praising the record's melodies and temper, felt that some of the songs' topics (such as album stickering and Rock Hudson) "are thumpingly dated."

However, some critics were extremely negative regarding the album. Rolling Stone's Rob Sheffield awarded the album 1 and a half stars out of 5, commenting that the album sounds like "a self-imitating mishmash of shout-along choruses, tepid beats and confused eclectic diddling", deeming the album "bumbling adult pop". Louis Pattison's review for Amazon.co.uk was also negative, deeming the songs "soulless" and "saccharine" and commenting that the album lacks subtlety and tact.

== Commercial performance ==
Upon its release, the album was a commercial failure for Chumbawamba, causing them to leave EMI a year later, due to disputes. However, in the United States, Republic/Universal handled releases for MUTT Records, especially Readymades, but dropped the band from the label in 2004, allowing them to sign onto Koch Records. As of August 2015, the album had sold 22,000 copies in the US.

== Track listing ==
All tracks are written by Chumbawamba except where indicated.

No.	Title	Writer(s)	Length
1.	"I'm With Stupid"		2:55
2.	"Shake Baby Shake"		1:53
3.	"Pass It Along"		3:24
4.	"Hey, Hey, We're the Junkies"		1:57
5.	"The Health & Happiness Show"		1:07
6.	"I'm Coming Out"		2:47
7.	"I'm in Trouble Again"		2:29
8.	"Social Dogma"		1:08
9.	"WWW Dot"		1:34
10.	"New York Mining Disaster 1941"	Barry Gibb, Robin Gibb	1:57
11.	"I'm Not Sorry, I Was Having Fun"		3:03
12.	"Jesus in Vegas"		2:57
13.	"The Standing Still"		1:32
14.	"She's Got All the Friends"		3:11
15.	"Ladies for Compassionate Lynching"		1:23
16.	"Celebration, Florida"		3:13
17.	"Moses With a Gun"		0:25
18.	"The Physical Impossibility of Death in the Mind of Jerry Springer"		0:48
19.	"Smart Bomb"		2:31
20.	"Knickers"		0:21
21.	"Lie Lie Lie Lie"		2:32
22.	"Dumbing Down"		4:30

German edition bonus tracks
No.	Title	Length
23.	"Just a Form of Music"	3:07
24.	"Lest We Forget"	1:25
25.	"Passenger List for Doomed Flight #1721"	2:49

Japanese edition bonus track
No.	Title	Length
23.	"Passenger List for Doomed Flight #1721"	2:49

== Song notes ==
- "I'm With Stupid", "Hey, Hey, We're the Junkies", "Shake Baby Shake", and "The Standing Still" contain samples from Helter Stupid by Negativland.
- A rock remix of "Pass It Along" was used in a Pontiac commercial, circa 2002.
- "New York Mining Disaster 1941" is a cover of the Bee Gees' 1967 single.
- The hidden track ends in Alice Nutter saying, "It's me trousers," and laughing, after which another voice says, "That's it."

== Personnel ==
Adapted from AllMusic and WYSIWYG liner notes.

Group Members

- Lou Watts - Vocals, Keyboards
- Harry Hamer - Drums, Vocals, Programming
- Danbert Nobacon - Vocals, Banjo
- Dunstan Bruce - Vocals
- Jude Abbott - Trumpet, Flugelhorn, Vocals
- Boff Whalley - Guitar, Vocals
- Alice Nutter - Vocals
- Neil Ferguson - Bass, Keyboards, Mouse

Also appearing

- DJ White Child Rix (from Gunshot) - Scratching
- Simon - Trombone
- Toby - Saxophone
- B. J. Cole - Pedal steel guitar
- Simon Lanzon - Additional vocal
- The Complimentary Peanuts - Vocals on "Health & Happiness Show"
- Armley Community Orchestra - Strings, woodwind
- One Minutes's Silence - Snare Drum
- Seething Wells - "That's It"
