= (Someone's Always Telling You How To) Behave =

Single by Chumbawamba

from the album Shhh
- Released: November 1992
- Recorded: Late Summer 1992
- Studio: Woodlands Studio
- Genre: Hardcore dance
- Length: 4:15
- Label: Agit-Prop Records
- Songwriter(s): Chumbawamba
- Producer(s): Chumbawamba

Chumbawamba singles chronology
"I Never Gave Up" (1990)	"(Someone's Always Telling You How To) Behave" (1992)	"Enough Is Enough" (1993)

"Behave!" (released as a single as "(Someone's Always Telling You How To) Behave") is a song by British rock group Chumbawamba. The song, which incorporates elements of rock and dance, criticizes homophobia in pop and rock music. The group recorded it in late summer 1992 but struggled to reach an agreement with their distributor, Southern Records, over the song's quality, release formats, and promotional budget. The band ultimately opted to form their own label, Agit Prop Records, to oversee the single's release.

"Behave" was released in November 1992 as a stand-alone single, following the release of their fifth studio album, Shhh, earlier in the year. Because the group was touring in America at the time of the single's release, they were unable to promote it, and its commercial impact was minimal. Critical response to the song was favorable, with particular praise going to the song's chorus and its transition between the group's punk and mainstream pop eras.

== Composition ==
"Pop stars can embrace any cause, charity, or issue — but still can't openly embrace people of their own sex. Pop reflects homophobic culture; promotes it, even. Seems like someone's always telling you how to behave..."

—Chumbawamba, (Someone's Always Telling You How to) Behave liner notes, 1992.

The group wrote and recorded "Behave" in response to multiple recent instances in which gay British pop stars were subjected to homophobic attacks or made homophobic comments. In the single's liner notes, the group singled out singer Jason Donovan's lawsuit against The Face magazine for intoning he was gay, as well as Happy Mondays vocalist Shaun Ryder's homophobic comments following speculation about his own sexual orientation, as inspirations for the track.

The song criticizes the music industry's role in promoting homophobic culture, and features a chorus about "brainwashing children", as well as a voice reciting the names of assorted musicians (including David Bowie and the Rolling Stones) who have been influenced by gay culture. Stylistically, the record was regarded as a bridge between their punk and mainstream phases, with Allmusic critic Brian Whitener writing that the song finds the group "somewhere between their Bacchanalian punk band in animal costumes and Tubthumper incarnations", while adding that when they recorded the song, the group were "definitely a dance band, but not yet a pop band." The group reflected that, in spite of the difficulties they faced in releasing and promoting the single, it "remains one of (their) favorite recordings."

== Release ==
The single was commercially released in the United Kingdom by the group's own newly formed record label, Agit Prop Records, in November 1992 as both a twelve-inch and a CD single. The release featured the label catalog number 666. In addition to the single mix, the single release featured a B-side titled "Misbehave", two A-side remixes by English industrial band Papa Brittle, and on the CD edition, an alternate version of "Behave" as a hidden track. Like the group's previous singles, "Behave" did not receive an official release in the United States; their first US release, "Homophobia", would come in May 1994. The single cover features a photo from an article written by New Musical Express journalist Steven Wells, who had favorably reviewed the band since their early days.

Initially, the group had planned to release the single through their then-label and distributor, Southern Records. However, on their website, Chumbawamba reflected that the single had been "not much loved by" the label, which was reluctant to release the song as a CD single (preferring to stick to a twelve-inch release only) and which lacked the financial resources to promote the single. These disagreements led the group to depart from Southern and form their own label, Agit-Prop, to release the single themselves. Ultimately, when "Behave" was released in the UK in November 1992, the group was touring in America and thus unable to promote the record where it had been released. By the time they had returned to England, the single "had virtually disappeared without a trace".

== Reception ==
In a review for AllMusic, Whitener wrote that the song "marks an interesting point of transition for the group" as they shifted from independent to more mainstream-minded music, and praised the song for "combin(ing) lyric and hardcore dance sensibilities" and for its "beautiful, and amusing" chorus. He also commended the B-side, "Misbehave", as evidence that the group "could write a serious hook." He ultimately awarded the single three stars out of five.

New York no wave queercore band God Is My Co-Pilot would go on to cover the song on their 1993 studio album Straight Not. A review by a Spin magazine critic opined that, on that group's cover, the vocal delivery — from group leads Craig Flanagin and Sharon Topper — was not so much angry as "curious".

== Track listing ==
1. "Behave" (4:15)
2. "Behave (Brittle Mix)" (5:36)
3. "Misbehave (Brittle Mix)" (3:41)
4. "Misbehave" (3:35)
5. "Behave" (Alternate Version) (4:14) (Hidden track)

== Credits ==
Adapted from album liner notes

- Engineering (Tracks 1, 4, and 5) — Paul Ferguson
- Engineering (Tracks 2 and 3) — Paul Harding
- Photography — Paula Solloway
- Production — Chumbawamba
