= Readymades =

Readymades may refer to:

- Found objects
- Readymades (album), an album by Chumbawamba

== See also ==
- Readymades of Marcel Duchamp
