= A Singsong and a Scrap =

Studio album by Chumbawamba
- Released: 11 October 2005
- Recorded: 2005
- Genre: Folk
- Length: 42:40
- Label: No Masters

Chumbawamba chronology
Un (2004)	A Singsong and a Scrap (2005)	Get On with It (2006)

Professional ratings
Review scores
Source	Rating
Allmusic	link

A Singsong and a Scrap is the 12th studio album by Chumbawamba, released in 2005. It shows more folk influence than their previous album Un and features guest appearances from folk musicians such as Coope Boyes and Simpson, Andy Cutting and John Jones and Ian Telfer of Oysterband. The first single to be taken from the album is "Fade Away".

It was the first album to feature the four-person lineup of Lou Watts, Boff Whalley, Jude Abbott and Neil Ferguson, without long-established members Alice Nutter, Dunstan Bruce, Harry Hamer and Danbert Nobacon, all of whom departed the band around that time.

== Background ==
"Laughter in a Time of War", "By and By", and "Walking into Battle with the Lord" feature vocals by John Jones of Oysterband. Additionally, Coope Boyes and Simpson contribute vocals to "Walking into Battle with the Lord", "Bankrobber", and "The Land of Do What You're Told". "By and By" is a tribute to Swedish-American labour activist Joe Hill. "You Can (Mass Trespass)" takes inspiration from the Mass Trespass of Kinder Scout, which led to land access reform across the UK. "When Alexander Met Emma" is about anarchists Emma Goldman and Alexander Berkman. "Bankrobber" is a cover of the Clash song of the same name, featured here in an a capella arrangement.

Chumbawamba recorded a cover of the traditional Italian song "Bella Ciao" in the wake of the controversial death of activist Carlo Giuliani in Genoa. The album features a hidden track, "The Untraditional", which is a song about forbidden love in the English folk tradition. Any mention of the track on the package was omitted to reinforce the "taboo" subject nature and "because it tries to make its point in a very quiet way".

== Track listing ==
All songs written, arranged and produced by Chumbawamba, except "Bankrobber" written by Joe Strummer and Mick Jones and "Bella Ciao" (traditional).

1. "Laughter in a Time of War" – 2:46
2. "William Francis" – 3:39
3. "By and By" – 4:31
4. "You Can (Mass Trespass, 1932)" – 4:38
5. "Walking into Battle with the Lord" – 2:56
6. "When Alexander Met Emma" – 3:10
7. "Fade Away (I Don't Want To)" – 3:10
8. "Bankrobber" – 2:07
9. "Learning to Love" – 3:12
10. "The Land of Do What You're Told" – 4:19
11. "Bella Ciao" – 1:34
12. "Smith and Taylor" – 4:00
13. "The Untraditional" – 1:56

== Personnel ==
All instruments and voices

- Jude Abbott
- Lou Watts
- Boff Whalley
- Neil Ferguson

With

- John Jones & Barry Coope, Jim Boyes & Lester Simpson – Vocals
- Winkie Thin – Accordion on 1, 4, 7, 10, 12; Whistling on 6; Cello on 9
- Richard Ormrod – Accordion on 3; Mellophone on 12
- Andy Cutting – Melodeon on 2,9
- James O'Grady – Uilleann pipes on 3, 13; Whistle on 2
- Ian Telfer – Fiddle on 7, 10
