= Ugh! Your Ugly Houses! =

Single by Chumbawamba

from the album Swingin' with Raymond
- Released: 25 September 1995
- Recorded: Woodland Studios, UK
- Genre: Punk rock
- Length: 2:23
- Label: One Little Indian (UK, 1995)
- Songwriter: Chumbawamba
- Producer: Chumbawamba

Chumbawamba singles chronology
"Homophobia" (1994)	"Ugh! Your Ugly Houses!" (1995)	"Just Look at Me Now" (1996)

"Ugh! Your Ugly Houses!" is a song by Chumbawamba. Released in 1995, it served as the lead single from the group's seventh studio album, Swingin' with Raymond. It was later featured on the group's 1999 compilation, Uneasy Listening. The song criticises the homes featured in celebrity gossip magazines such as Hello. Upon its release, the song attained modest chart success in the United Kingdom, where it became their fourth chart entry, spending one week in the top 100. It was generally well-received by critics, who praised its humorous lyrics and composition.

== Lyrics ==
Ugh! Your Ugly Houses! is often thought to be about suburban neighbourhoods, but is actually about the homes of certain rich celebrities. In AllMusic's review of Uneasy Listening, music critic Alex Ogg summarized the song as "a sideswipe at the non-taste of the celebrities featured in Hello magazine."

== Release ==
The song was first included on the group's 1996 album Swingin' with Raymond. It was again featured on their 1999 compilation Uneasy Listening.

== Critical reception ==
AllMusic's Chris Nickson regarded the song as a highlight of Swingin' with Raymond, praising "the interjection of 'In an English Country Garden' [...] that gets trampled by buzzing punk guitar and beats." Music critic Robert Christgau praised the song as "funny."

== Commercial performance ==
The song was a modest hit in the UK, reaching number 84 on their Singles Chart on the chart dated 21 October 1995, becoming the group's fourth entry on that chart.

== Formats and track listings ==
- CD and cassette single
1. "Ugh! Your Ugly Houses!" – 2:23
2. "Mannequin" (Wire cover) – 2:30
3. "This Girl" – 3:43
4. "Hunchback of Notre Dame" – 2:13
- 7" vinyl
1. "Ugh! Your Ugly Houses!" – 2:23
2. "This Girl" – 3:43
