= Un (album) =

Studio album by Chumbawamba
- Released: 8 June 2004
- Recorded: 2003
- Studio: Shabby Road Studios (Bradford)
- Genre: Electronic; folk; pop
- Length: 45:36
- Label: Koch
- Producer: Chumbawamba

Chumbawamba chronology
Readymades (2002)	Un (2004)	A Singsong and a Scrap (2005)

Singles from Un
- 1. "The Wizard of Menlo Park" Released: 2004; 2. "On eBay" Released: 2004

Un is the eleventh studio album by English rock band Chumbawamba, released on 8 June 2004 by Koch Records. The album was written and produced by solely by Chumbawamba. A musical departure from predecessor Readymades (2002), the album incorporates elements of folk, electronic, and world music. Thematically, the album acts as a social commentary on a variety of political and social issues, including individualism and anti-consumerism. Un was promoted with two singles: "The Wizard of Menlo Park" and "On eBay".

It would be the band's last album with long-standing members Alice Nutter, Dunstan Bruce and Danbert Nobacon, apart from their guest appearances on the band's final release Going, Going – Live at Leeds City Varieties in 2012.

Professional ratings
Review scores
Source	Rating
AllMusic	3/5 stars
laut.de	3/5 stars
Robert Christgau	(2-star Honorable Mention)

== Composition ==
In an interview with Dutch music website KindaMuzik, lead guitarist Boff Whalley reflected that the band's previous album, Readymades (2002), was "a real studio record", with calm songs that didn't adapt well to live performances. When writing and recording Un, the band decided to write more upbeat songs that would be good for live performances.

The album features Latin American, Polynesian, and Cuban styles of music. Many of the album's samples were recorded by Alice Nutter in Cuba and Mexico while she was vacationing and visiting with labor activists, respectively.

The band wrote the song "On eBay" after the looting of an Iraqi museum that the United States had vowed to protect. Nutter remarked in a 2004 interview that "we can probably expect half the things – deeply personal possessions and defining historical items - that were taken from the museum to eventually end up on ebay for £1.50."

== Release ==
The album spawned two singles. A CD single for "The Wizard of Menlo Park" featured a radio edit of the track, with an acoustic version of "On eBay" as its B-side. The single for "On eBay" included two versions of the song: the radio version and the "Tower of Babel Mix".

== Critical reception ==
In a review for BBC Music, critic Chris Moss wrote that "All the conviction… has been invested in the words and the moralising message while there is a soft, unimpassioned edge to the arrangements", deeming the album to be the musical equivalent of Naomi Klein's 1999 book No Logo: "worthy, wise but not very sexy". Gavin Miller, writing for Leeds Music Scene, praised the "anarchic humour" of certain tracks but criticized the use of spoken word.

Critic Don Pflaster, writing for Impact Press, called the album "an exercise in political hipness", commending the songs' construction, "lyrical bravery", and "head-bobbin' fun". American critic Robert Christgau gave the album a two-star honorable mention, denoting a "likable effort consumers attuned to its overriding aesthetic or individual vision may well enjoy", and named "When Fine Society Sits Down to Dine" and "On eBay" as highlights.

Reviewer Chris Long, writing for BBC Manchester, awarded the album a score of 8 out of 10, calling it one of the best albums of the year. Playlouder ranked Un at number 42 on its list of the best albums of 2004, praising the record's combination of Spanish, Argentinian, and Cuban music with "their English sense of righteous enjoyment while politicising".

== Track listing ==
All tracks are written by Chumbawamba.

No.	Title	Length
1.	"The Wizard of Menlo Park"	3:41
2.	"Just Desserts"	4:01
3.	"On eBay"	3:47
4.	"Everything You Know Is Wrong"	5:08
5.	"Be with You"	3:27
6.	"When Fine Society Sits Down to Dine"	5:31
7.	"A Man Walks into a Bar"	4:00
8.	"Buy Nothing Day"	3:47
9.	"Following You"	2:48
10.	"We Don't Want to Sing Along"	3:17
11.	"I Did It for Alfie"	2:39
12.	"Rebel Code"	3:28

Notes

- "The Wizard of Menlo Park" contains a sample of "Mary Had a Little Lamb", as recited by Thomas Edison.
- "Just Desserts" contains a sampled excerpt from a 1977 Des Moines press conference featuring Anita Bryant.

== Personnel ==
- Alice Nutter – vocals
- Jude Abbott – trumpet, vocals
- Dunstan Bruce – vocals
- Lou Watts – vocals, keyboards
- Boff Whalley – guitar, vocals
- Neil Ferguson – bass, vocals
- Harry Hamer – drums, vocals
- Danbert Nobacon – vocals

with

- Andy Cutting – diatonic accordion
- Gill Pearson – violin
- Justin Sullivan – mouth organ
