= Top of the World (Olé, Olé, Olé) =

Single by Chumbawamba
- B-side: "The Best Is Yet to Come"; "I'm a Winner, Baby"
- Released: 25 May 1998
- Recorded: January 1998
- Studio: Woodlands Studio (Castleford)
- Genre: Dance-rock
- Length: 3:49
- Label: EMI
- Songwriter: Chumbawamba
- Producers: Chumbawamba; Neil Ferguson

Chumbawamba singles chronology
"Drip Drip Drip" (1998)	"Top of the World (Olé, Olé, Olé)" (1998)	"Tony Blair" (1999)

"Top of the World (Olé, Olé, Olé)" is a stand-alone single from Chumbawamba. It was released in May 1998, and the single reached number 21 on the UK Singles Chart. It was also featured on the World Cup 1998 compilation album Music of the World Cup: Allez! Ola! Ole!. Their 1997 album Tubthumper was re-issued with this song on the album.

== Track listings ==
=== CD1 ===
1. "Top of the World (Olé Olé Olé)"
2. "The Best Is Yet to Come (Acoustic Version)"
3. "The Best Is Yet to Come"
4. "I'm a Winner, Baby"
5. "Strike! (Barnsley 3 Man Utd. 2 Mix)"

=== CD2 ===
1. "Top of the World"
2. "The Best Is Yet to Come (Acoustic Version)"
3. "The Best Is Yet to Come (Bee Hole End Version)"
4. "I’m a Winner Baby"
