= Shhh (Chumbawamba album) =

Studio album by Chumbawamba
- Released: 29 June 1992
- Recorded: 1990–1992
- Genre: Anarcho-punk; alternative rock; alternative dance
- Length: 45:34
- Label: Agit-Prop Records/Southern Records (UK) Reprise Records (France)

Chumbawamba chronology
Slap! (1990)	Shhh (1992)	Anarchy (1994)

Professional ratings
Review scores
Source	Rating
Allmusic	4/5 stars
Spin	positive

Shhh is the fifth studio album by British band Chumbawamba. It was originally written and recorded as Jesus H. Christ, an album that relied heavily on samples. The band was unable to procure rights to a number of the songs they sampled, however, and the album was largely re-worked to defend artistic intent and criticize censorship. The album sleeve artwork itself incorporated various rejection letters received by the band denying the rights to the Christ samples. Shhh is considered by many to be a "genre landmark."

The album was re-released with Slap! in the compilation Shhhlap!, released by MUTT Records on July 15, 2003.

== Track listing ==
All songs written and produced by Chumbawamba, except where noted.

#	Song name	Length	Notes
1	"Shhh"	4:59	Samples "Shopping" by the Pet Shop Boys
2	"Big Mouth Strikes Again"	5:36	Features rap by MC Fusion; Not a cover of The Smiths' song, but about controversial comedian Lenny Bruce.
3	"Nothing That's New"	3:06	
4	"Behave!"	3:03	Different version of "Behave" released as single.
5	"Snip Snip Snip"	2:55	Contains brief sample of piano from ABBA's song "Money Money Money" during the first break
6	"Look! No Strings!"	5:34	
7	"Happiness Is Just a Chant Away"	6:37	The final chant is parody of Hare Krishna mantras, instead chanting name of cop killer Harry Roberts. "Harry Roberts is our friend" is a popular non-sectarian anti police chant at British football matches and is also occasionally heard at political demonstrations; Contains references to several Beatles' songs, including backwards a guitar solo like in "Tomorrow Never Knows", lyrics from "I've Got a Feeling" and a trumpet part mimicking the horn solo from "For No One"
8	"Pop Star Kidnap"	1:26	
9	"Sometimes Plunder"	5:04	Features rap by MC Fusion; The title is a reference to the line "sometimes wonder" from Slap! song "Ulrike," changing it to be an attack on the music industry's attack on sampling, pointing out that bands like the Beatles and Rolling Stones stole from African American music, yet they made "a living sometimes plundering"
10	"You Can't Trust Anyone Nowadays"	4:58	
11	"Stitch That"	2:10	Uncredited cover of the Mike Waterson/Martin Carthy song "A Stitch in Time"; Contains samples from the Beatles' "Sgt. Pepper's Lonely Hearts Club Band," with a drum beat similar to that song's reprise, and the final piano chord from "A Day in the Life". Alternate live arrangement appears on Showbusiness!. Folk version appears Get On With It! Live album.

== Original Jesus H. Christ track listing ==
No.	Title	Appearance on Shhh	Samples and notes
1	"Intro"	-	A 10-second sample of the intro to the Beatles' 1967 album Sgt. Pepper's Lonely Hearts Club Band. Allegedly, original vinyl copies of this LP open with a few seconds of high-pitched tone before the intro, most likely referencing the 15 kHz tone inserted at the end of English Sgt. Pepper's LPs to "irritate listeners' dogs."
2	"Alright Now"	-	Uses the melody of "All Right Now" by Free, as well as the chorus of "That's The Way (I Like It)" by KC and the Sunshine Band. Has a large sample from the movie The Loneliness of the Long Distance Runner
3	"Don't Fence Me In"	-	A cover version of the 1934 song by Cole Porter and Robert Fletcher.
4	"Money Money Money"	Medley of "Snip Snip Snip" and "Pop Star Kidnap"	Uses the chorus from "Money Money Money" by ABBA, as well as bits of "Money (That's What I Want)" and "Who Wants to Be a Millionaire?" Incidentally, this song seems to end very abruptly, leading very awkwardly into the next track.
5	"Solid Gold Easy Action"	Became "Sometimes Plunder"	Uses the chorus from "Solid Gold Easy Action" by T.Rex, as well as a brief melody from Rhapsody in Blue by George Gershwin. Does not yet include MC Fusion's rap verse.
6	"Silly Love Songs"	MC Fusion's opening rap, the piano melody, and the "behave!" sample all reappeared in "Behave"	Uses a line from "Silly Love Songs" by Wings, as well as lyrics from "Little Lies" by Fleetwood Mac and "Gimme Some Truth" by John Lennon.
7	"Get Off My Cloud"	Alternate take became "Look! No Strings!"	Featuring a different ending derived from the chorus of "Get Off Of My Cloud" by The Rolling Stones
8	"Stairway to Heaven"	A version with a drastically different instrumental backing became "Happiness Is Just a Chant Away"	Uses the chorus of "Everybody's Happy Nowadays" by Buzzcocks. Incidentally, unlike the other tracks on the album, the title does not match with a prominent sample – though Led Zeppelin's "Stairway to Heaven" is only heard as a vague string rendition of the "if there's a bustle in your hedgerow" melody, appearing under the main composition directly after the verses.
9	"Big Mouth Strikes Again"	Reused with a very different mix and addition of Fusion's rap verse.	The harmonica that is heard on this version makes a very brief and quiet appearance on the Shhh version, probably by accident.
10	"Street Music"	Became the end of "Snip Snip Snip"	Sound collage, sometimes referred to as "Street Sounds".
11	"I Should Be So Lucky"	Became "You Can't Trust Anyone Nowadays"	Uses the chorus from "I Should Be So Lucky" by Kylie Minogue, as well as lines from "I Heard It Through the Grapevine" by Marvin Gaye and "Brown Shoes Don't Make It" by the Mothers of Invention.
12	"Stitch That"	Reused with different mix	Similar to the Shhh version, except the music consists entirely of looped samples from Sgt. Pepper's Lonely Hearts Club Band (Reprise). The voice after the "A Day In The Life" piano chord says "What about the album?" and not "Shhh!".

== Other Shhh-era tracks ==
- "I Never Gave Up" – A-side. A remake of the track from Slap!, available in two versions – the Rondo Mix and the Cass Mix. The Cass Mix includes a clip of Spinal Tap's Viv Savage saying his motto, "Have a good time, all the time." This would later reappear in the lyrics of "Look! No Strings!".
- "Laughing" – B-side to above. Essentially a variation on "I Never Gave Up", this was re-recorded with a new chorus to become the title track of Shhh.
- "Behave" – A-side. Similar to the album version, albeit with a full set of new lyrics. The single included three mixes – an original version, the Brittle Mix, and a hidden version containing only voice and percussion.
- "Misbehave" – B-side to above, no relation to its similarly titled counterpart. Both an original version and the Brittle Mix were included on the single.
- "Harry's Ambient Mantra" – Not quite a Shhh-era track; actually recorded in the transition period between Shhh and Anarchy. This would have been the B-side to "Hat Trick for Harry," an unreleased single track whose ending section appeared as "Blackpool Rock" on Anarchy. However, this track bore no relation to the A-side, being a lengthy ambient remix of "Happiness Is Just a Chant Away." While never officially released in full, a small portion appeared as a hidden track on the Uneasy Listening compilation.

== Personnel ==
- Lou Watts – vocals, keyboard
- Alice Nutter – vocals, habit, rabbit
- Danbert Nobacon – vocals, elastic band, foam
- Mavis Dillon – bass guitar, vocals, trumpet
- Harry Hamer – drums, percussion, Octopus's Garden
- Boff Whalley – guitar, vocals, refrigerator
- Dunstan Bruce – vocals, percussion, hammering

with

- Simon "Commonknowledge" Lanzon – keyboards, accordion, voice
- MC Fusion – vocals
- Neil Ferguson – guitar, keyboards, engineering
- Geoff Slaphead – fiddle
- Howard Storey – vocals
