= Pass It Along =

Song by Chumbawamba

from the album WYSIWYG
- Released: 2000
- Length: 3:24
- Label: EMI
- Songwriter: Chumbawamba
- Producers: Chumbawamba; Neil Ferguson

"Pass It Along" is a song by English rock band Chumbawamba, taken from their 2000 studio album WYSIWYG. The song mocks gated communities and a lack of public spaces, as well as Microsoft and its founder, Bill Gates. Its chorus is based on the Microsoft slogan "Where do you want to go today?" The song was originally released as a CD single in 2000 in Europe and the United States, and met with favorable critical reception. In October 2000, the group released a free digital download the song's "MP3 Mix", a critique of musicians who opposed file sharing. It drew attention for its samples of songs by Madonna, John Lennon, Metallica, Elvis Presley, and Eminem.

In 2002, General Motors paid the group between $70,000 and $100,000 for the right to use the song in a television commercial for the Pontiac Vibe. Chumbawamba, despite having turned down some previous song-rights offers, accepted the payment from GM, and then donated the money to two consumer advocacy groups which dedicated the money to anti-GM information campaigns.

== Composition and release ==
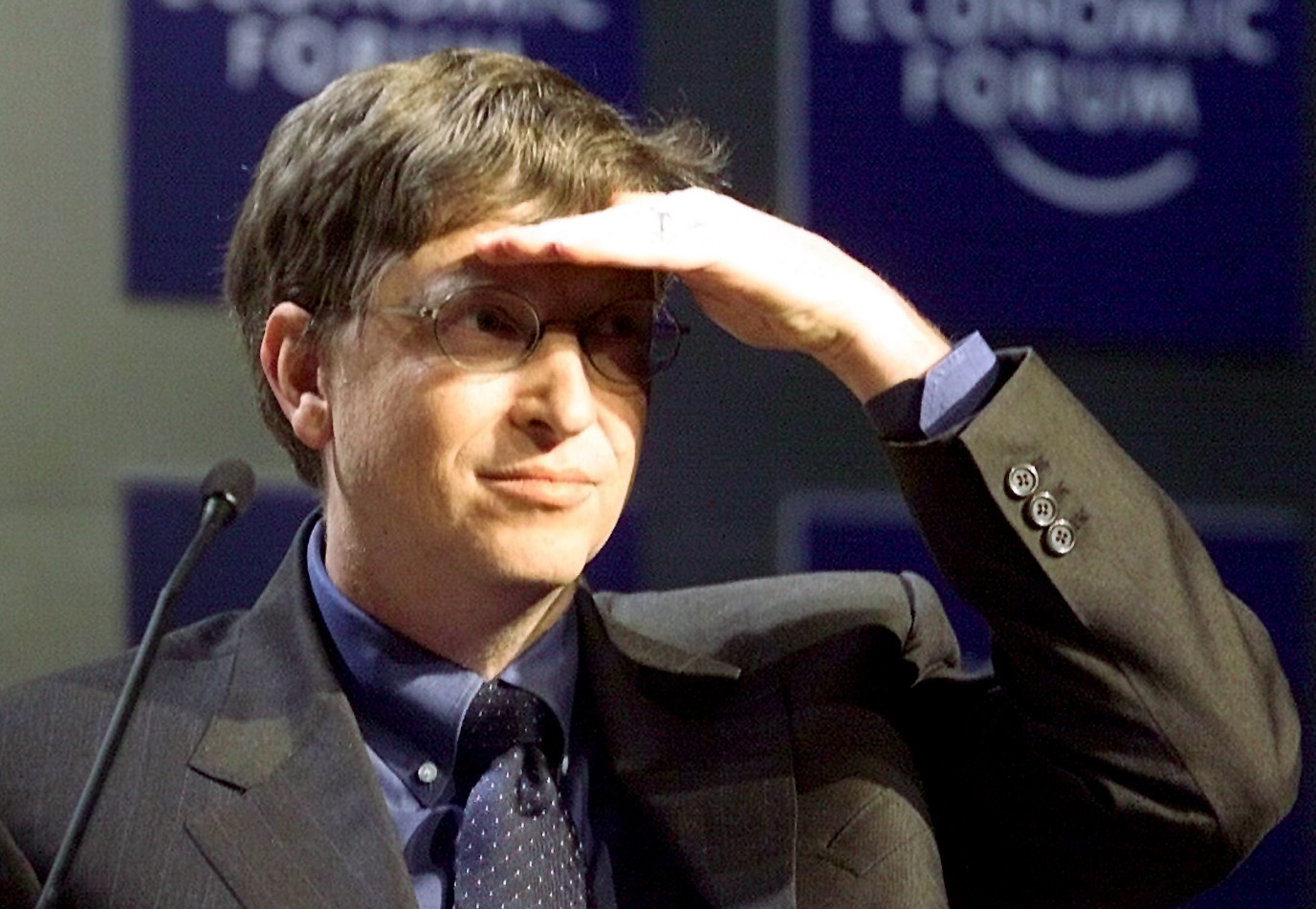
Among the targets of criticism in “Pass It Along” was Microsoft founder Bill Gates.

=== Album version ===
The original album version of "Pass It Along" is performed in the time signature of 4/4, with a tempo of 90 beats per minute. They recorded the single edit of the song at "Shabbey Road Studios" in May 2000. The group was inspired to write the song, which criticizes gated communities, after reading City of Quartz, a book about Los Angeles. In the liner notes for WYSIWYG, they elaborated on their inspiration for the song, lamenting the lack of public spaces. The song's chorus mocks Microsoft's "Where do you want to go today?" slogan.

Billboard reported that the song, along with "WWW Dot", "address(es) the growing influence of the Internet and the need to ensure its positive application." In keeping with their criticisms of Microsoft and Bill Gates, the group originally sought to have the cover of the song's parent album, WYSIWYG, feature a photo of Gates being hit in the face by a pie; the label ultimately overruled them. In a review of WYSIWYG, AllMusic’s Stephen Thomas Erlewine deemed the song’s lyrics, along with those of other tracks on the album, "a little obvious."

=== MP3 Mix ===
The group recorded an alternate mix of the song titled the "MP3 Mix". This version was a sound collage, critiquing and sampling without permission artists who opposed file sharing, including Metallica, Eminem, Dr. Dre, The Beatles, and Madonna. The MP3 Mix includes references to and samples from Noam Chomsky, Jello Biafra, Madonna's "Justify My Love", Metallica's "Enter Sandman", and Eminem's "The Real Slim Shady". It also imagines a "beyond-the-grave" conversation between John Lennon and Elvis Presley, which features an exchange in which the former says "The best things in life are free" and the latter responds "Well it's a-one for the money".

In a statement on the band's website, vocalist Dunstan Bruce explained that it was "a reaction to the hokum that opposing file sharing is somehow linked to artistic integrity", elaborating that "If Ulrich, Madonna and Eminem had never sold any records and were worried about entering a poverty stricken old age, then their determination to stop their music being passed around would be understandable – but what we’re seeing is some of the richest pop stars in the world making the biggest stink". On 25 October 2000, a spokesperson for the band told NME that they had not yet received any notice of legal action from the sampled artists.

=== Release ===
The song was included as the third track on Chumbawamba's 2000 studio album, WYSIWYG. CMJ New Music Report named the song a "recommended track" from the album. In Europe, EMI Group released the song in 2000 as a three-track CD single with the single version, in addition to the "Jeep Reference Version" and an acoustic edit. A single-track CD single was released by Republic Records in the United States. On 20 October 2000, the group digitally released the song's "MP3 Mix" via their website as a free download.

== Media use ==
=== Initial offer ===
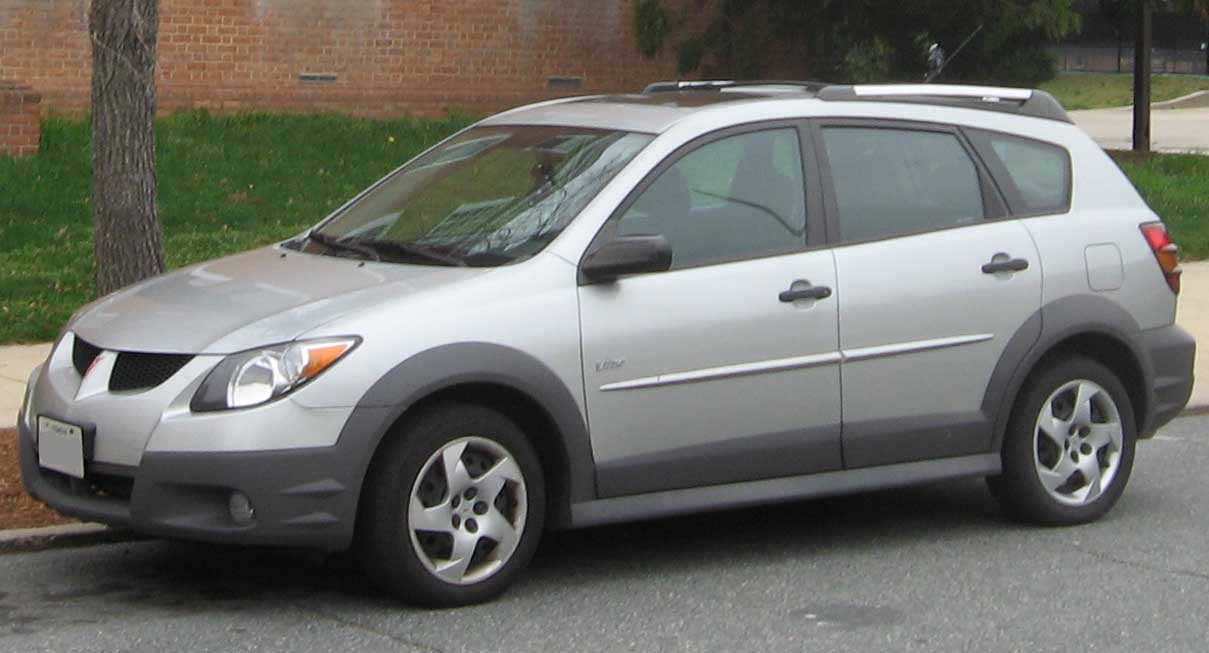
General Motors offered Chumbawamba at least $70,000 to use the song in commercials for the Pontiac Vibe.

In January 2002, General Motors expressed interest in using "Pass It Along" for its latest advertising campaign for its Pontiac line of cars, specifically the Vibe; the campaign's slogan was "Pass It On." The company offered the group a sum of money that has been reported as $70,000, $100,000, and £70,000 for the rights to the song. Chumbawamba had previously rejected some requests for the rights to their music, having previously turned down offers of $700,000 and $1 million from General Electric and Nike, respectively, for the use of their music in commercials for an X-ray machine and the 1998 World Cup; the group had, however, consented to license their music for use in the motion picture Home Alone 3, a video game, and a dancing gorilla toy. Boff Whalley, a Chumbawamba member, stated that the group considers the company's politics and labor practices in deciding to whom to grant rights to their music.

=== Group response ===
Upon receiving the offer from General Motors, the group consulted with Indymedia and Corpwatch, two "corporate jammer" activist groups whom the band supported, to get their advice. Following their conversation with the activists, Chumbawamaba agreed to General Motors's offer, and then donated the proceeds to the two charities. The organizations in turn used the funds to finance "an aggressive information and environmental campaign" against the automaker, criticizing the company for supporting climate change deniers and refusing to revise production techniques. A Philadelphia activist with Indymedia told Salon that the organization was initially reluctant to accept the money, given that it had been indirectly provided by a company whose practices they opposed, but they ultimately decided to accept the donation, viewing it as "coming not from GM but from Chumbawamba." Chumbawamba had previously made similar use of money from licensing deals with Renault in Italy and Ford in South Africa. The band acknowledged, however, that their decision to grant GM rights to the song was also influenced by the increased exposure their recordings might receive.

Following the group's announcement of their use of the money, General Motors declined to comment to Salon. A publicist for GM's Pontiac told the Guardian that "I didn't know that. I did know [the band] had quite a political background in England. That's very interesting." Jacobin reflected on the group's decision, calling it "their most subversive use of corporate money". Their donation of the money was also compared to that of electronic musician Moby, who in 1996 had donated money to an environmental advocacy group after being paid for the use of his music in a car commercial; he had said in an interview that "There's something perversely satisfying about taking money from a car company and then giving it to organizations which work to protect the environment".

== Track listings ==
- European CD single
1. Pass It Along (Single Version) — 3:29
2. Pass It Along (Jeep Reference Version) — 3:14
3. Pass It Along (Acoustic) — 2:10
- US CD single
1. Pass It Along — 3:24

== Personnel ==
Adapted from WYSIWYG and CD single liner notes.

- Lou Watts — vocals, keyboards
- Harry Hamer — drums, vocals, programming
- Danbert Nobacon — vocals, banjo
- Dunstan Bruce — vocals
- Jude Abbot — trumpet, flugelhorn, vocals
- Boff Whalley — guitar, vocals
- Alice Nutter — vocals
- Neil Ferguson — bass, keyboards
- Baader-Meinhof — sleeve design
