= She's Got All the Friends That Money Can Buy =

Single by Chumbawamba

from the album WYSIWYG
- Released: 29 February 2000
- Recorded: 2000 at Woodlands Studio, Castleford, UK
- Genre: Alternative rock, pop
- Length: 3:11 (album version) 2:52 (radio edit)
- Label: EMI
- Songwriter: Chumbawamba
- Producers: Chumbawamba & Neil Ferguson

Chumbawamba singles chronology
| "Tony Blair" (1999) | "She's Got All the Friends That Money Can Buy" (2000) | "Enough Is Enough (Kick It Over)" (2000) |

"She's Got All the Friends That Money Can Buy" is a song by the English band Chumbawamba from their ninth studio album, WYSIWYG (2000). It was written and produced by Chumbawamba with additional production by Neil Ferguson. EMI released it as the album's lead single on 29 February 2000. A pop song, its lyrics describe a socialite who has benefited from her parents' wealth.

The song received mixed reviews from critics. Its B-side, "Passenger List for Doomed Flight #1721", was subject to controversy upon its release, due to its lyrics' criticism of a number of prominent social figures.

The song's introduction samples an audio clip from the American cable barker channel, Sneak Prevue.

== Reception ==
=== Critical ===
The song was met with mixed reviews from critics upon its release. CMJ New Music Monthly, in their review of the song's parent album, described the track as "entertaining" but "ham-fisted." Rolling Stone, although highly critical of the song's parent album, praised the lyric "you can buy your friends but I'll hate you for free."

=== Commercial ===
The song was commercially unsuccessful, failing to enter the UK Singles Chart nor the Billboard Hot 100. The song received very little airplay upon its release. BBC Radio 1 considered the original version of the song "too pop" to receive airplay, so a second version of the song was recorded and released by former Eurovision Song Contest entrants and fellow West Yorkshire band Black Lace. The latter version is available from Chumbawamba's website for download.

== Music video ==
A music video was released to promote the single. It depicts band members performing in front of a white background.

== B-side ==
The B-side, "Passenger List for Doomed Flight #1721", was extremely controversial upon its release due to its subject matter: it called out, by name, a number of public figures (real and fictitious) of whom the group disapproved. Some of these included Courtney Love, Bill Gates, Bill Clinton, Tony Blair, Ally McBeal, Rupert Murdoch, and Bono. Following the song's release, many DJs threatened to remove the group from rotation. Regarding the controversy, vocalist Alice Nutter told MTV that "I'm always shocked by what causes controversy [...] All you have to do is write a song that's not a love song. People pretend they're absolutely stopped dead by a song that waves bye-bye to Bono. It's just pop music."

== Formats and track listings ==
- European CD single
1. "She's Got All the Friends That Money Can Buy" (single edit) – 2:52
2. "Just a Form of Music" – 3:04
- German CD single
1. "She's Got All the Friends That Money Can Buy" (single edit) – 2:52
2. "Just a Form of Music" – 3:04
3. "Lest We Forget" – 1:28
4. "Passenger List for Doomed Flight #1721" – 2:49
- Japanese CD single
1. "She's Got All the Friends That Money Can Buy" (single edit) – 2:52
2. "Just a Form of Music" – 3:04
3. "Lest We Forget" – 1:27

== Release history ==
| Region | Date | Formats(s) | Label(s) | Ref(s). |
|---|---|---|---|---|
| United States | 29 February 2000 | Contemporary hit radio | Republic; Universal | |
