= List of Billboard Adult Top 40 number-one songs of the 1990s =

The Adult Top 40 chart is published weekly by Billboard magazine and ranks "the most popular adult top 40 as based on radio airplay detections measured by Nielsen BDS." The chart was first published in the March 16, 1996, issue of Billboard; however, historically, the chart's introduction was in October 1995, when it began as a test chart.

The Adult Top 40 chart was formed following a split of the "Hot Adult Contemporary" chart due to the growing emergence of Adult Top 40 radio stations in the 1990s. These stations played a wider variety of artists and saw a faster turnover of songs compared to traditional adult contemporary radio. Songs by modern rock, dance, and R&B artists were mixed in with acts more closely associated with adult contemporary. According to Billboard, splitting the chart "better reflect[s] the music being played on adult contemporary and adult/top 40 stations."

== Chart history ==
† – Year-end number-one single

Issue date	Song	Artist	Weeks at number one	Ref.
1995
October 7	"Kiss from a Rose"	Seal	6	
November 18	"As I Lay Me Down"	Sophie B. Hawkins	3	
December 9	"Roll to Me"	Del Amitri	1	
December 16	"As I Lay Me Down"	Sophie B. Hawkins	4	
1996
January 13	"One Sweet Day"	Mariah Carey & Boyz II Men	10	
March 23	"Time"	Hootie & the Blowfish	2	
April 6	"Because You Loved Me"	Celine Dion	12	
June 29	"Give Me One Reason" †	Tracy Chapman	8	
August 24	"Change the World"	Eric Clapton	6	
October 5	"I Love You Always Forever"	Donna Lewis	1	
October 12	"Change the World"	Eric Clapton	1	
October 19	"I Love You Always Forever"	Donna Lewis	7	
December 7	"Head Over Feet"	Alanis Morissette	3	
December 28	"Don't Speak"	No Doubt	15	
1997
April 12	"You Were Meant for Me"	Jewel	6	
May 24	"One Headlight"	The Wallflowers	5	
June 28	"Sunny Came Home"	Shawn Colvin	7	
August 16	"All for You"	Sister Hazel	7	
October 4	"Foolish Games"	Jewel	5	
November 8	"I Don't Want to Wait"	Paula Cole	6	
December 20	"Tubthumping"	Chumbawamba	5	
1998
January 24	"Walkin' on the Sun"	Smash Mouth	3	
February 14	"3 a.m."	Matchbox Twenty	10	
April 25	"Torn" †	Natalie Imbruglia	14	
August 1	"Iris"	Goo Goo Dolls	17	
November 28	"Thank U"	Alanis Morissette	2	
December 12	"Lullaby"	Shawn Mullins	8	
1999
February 6	"Angel"	Sarah McLachlan	7	
March 27	"Slide" †	Goo Goo Dolls	2	
April 10	"Every Morning"	Sugar Ray	10	
June 19	"Livin' La Vida Loca"	Ricky Martin	6	
July 31	"All Star"	Smash Mouth	8	
September 25	"She's So High"	Tal Bachman	1	
October 2	"All Star"	Smash Mouth	1	
October 9	"She's So High"	Tal Bachman	2	
October 23	"Smooth"	Santana featuring Rob Thomas	25^{[A]}	

- A "Smooth" spent the last 10 weeks of 1999 and the first 15 weeks of 2000 at number one

== See also ==
- 1990s in music
