= Showbusiness! =

Showbusiness

Live album by Chumbawamba
- Released: 1994
- Recorded: 18/19 August 1994
- Genre: Anarcho-punk
- Length: 46:36
- Label: One Little Indian Records/London Records (1994)

Chumbawamba chronology
Anarchy (1994)	Showbusiness (1994)	Swingin' with Raymond (1995)

Professional ratings
Review scores
Source	Rating
Allmusic	link

Showbusiness! is a 1994 live album by anarchist punk band Chumbawamba. It was recorded on the 18 and 19 August 1994 at the Duchess of York in Leeds. The album was issued in the United States as the For A Free Humanity: For Anarchy double CD, coupling Showbusiness! with Noam Chomsky's Capital Rules.

== Track listing ==
All songs written and arranged by Chumbawamba.

#	Track name	Song name	Length	Original Album
1	"Never Do"	"Never Do What You Are Told"	1:22	Anarchy
2	"Never Gave Up"	"Rappoport's Testament: I Never Gave Up"	5:59	Slap!
3	"Anarchist"	"Give the Anarchist a Cigarette"	4:07	Anarchy
4	"Heaven/Hell"	"Heaven/Hell"	2:59	Anarchy
5	"Grateful"	"That's How Grateful We Are"	7:50	Slap!
6	"Homophobia"	"Homophobia (Single Version)"	4:06	Anarchy
7	"Morality"	"A Morality Play"	3:29	b-side of "Homophobia" single
8	"Dog"	"Bad Dog"	5:03	Anarchy
9	"Stitch"	"Stitch That"	4:07	Shhh
10	"Mouthful"	"Mouthful of Shit"	3:55	Anarchy
11	"Nazi"	"The Day the Nazi Died (Acapella)"	1:32	b-side of "Homophobia" single
12	"Timebomb (Jimmy Echo Vocal)"	"Timebomb (Jimmy Echo Vocal)"	4:09	Anarchy
13	"Slag Aid"	"How to Get Your Band on Television (Part II)"	5:05	Pictures of Starving Children Sell Records

Mobile studio and recording/engineering: Neil Ferguson

== Personnel ==
- Danbert Nobacon - Vocals
- Dunstan Bruce - Percussion
- Lou Watts - Vocals, Keyboards
- Alice Nutter - Vocals
- Mavis Dillon - Trumpet, Vocals
- Paul Greco - Bass
- Boff Whalley - Guitar, Vocals
