= Jacob's Ladder (Not in My Name) =

Single by Chumbawamba

from the album Readymades And Then Some
- Released: December 16, 2002
- Recorded: 2002 at Woodlands Studio, Castleford, UK
- Genre: Folk
- Length: 2:52
- Label: MUTT
- Songwriters: Chumbawamba & Davey Graham
- Producer: Chumbawamba

Chumbawamba singles chronology
"Her Majesty" (2002)	"Jacob's Ladder (Not in My Name)" (2002)	"Tubthumping (Remix)" (2003)

"Jacob's Ladder (Not in My Name)" is a song by English rock band Chumbawamba. An earlier version of the song, criticizing Winston Churchill, was included on their 2002 studio album Readymades, but in response to the incipient Iraq War, the group rewrote the song as a broader criticism of war. It has been described as an anti-war song, and incorporates folk influences as well as sampling.

The song was released as a CD single and as a free download on the group's website in December 2002; it was later included on a re-release of Readymades. Following its release, it was featured in multiple collections of anti-war songs, and the group performed it at a January 2003 protest in Washington, DC.

== Composition ==
The group recorded their first version of "Jacob's Ladder" for their 2002 studio album Readymades; this original version criticized Winston Churchill and his decision during World War II to allow 1,500 sailors to drown near Norway. In the liner notes of Readymades And Then Some, the group referred to the Iraq War as "a war about oil, fear, revenge, and capital."

They wrote a new version of the song as war with Iraq began looking likely in late 2002. The "Not in My Name" version has been classified as folk and is two minutes and fifty-two seconds long. It has been classified as an anti-war song. It includes the lyrics "When we're pushing up daisies/We all look the same" and also alludes to the September 11 attacks, with the lines "9/11 got branded/9/11 got sold/And there'll be no one left to water/All the seeds you sow". The song features guitarist Davy Graham as well as a sample of a song by folk singer Harry Cox. The Cox sample, taken from "The Pretty Ploughboy", consists of the line "and they sent him to the war to be slain"; in the Readymades and Then Some liner notes, the group referred to the use of the line as "a context in which it surely belongs".

The song was released following a push by some American conservatives to boycott musicians who were critical of the Iraq War; Fleetwood Mac, OutKast, R.E.M., and George Michael were among other artists to release anti-war songs at the same time. In Taboo Tunes, author Peter Blecha argues that the song was more critical of war in general than of the Iraq War in particular, contrasting it with songs critical of the Iraq War in particular such as the Beastie Boys' "In a World Gone Mad", and songs critical of Bush's policy in general such as John Mellencamp's "To Washington". The group later reflected on their website that the song was "as relevant as ever. We are still at war."

== Release ==
The song was released on December 16, 2002, as a CD single, with two additional tracks: the original, "albumesque" version of the song, and a B-side titled "Round 'em Up and Throw 'Em In". On January 18, 2003, the group performed the song on National Public Radio's Weekend Edition, in advance of an anti-war rally in Washington, DC, at which they were also slated to perform. It was also made available as a free download on the group's website, Chumba.com; on the site, they labeled the song "an anti-war MP3". The song was also featured as a B-side to their 2003 promotional single, a Flaming Lips remix of "Tubthumping".

In March 2003, Salon promoted the song download as part of its "Anti-war sampler" playlist. The May 2003 charity compilation Peace Not War also featured the track. The original version of the song was included on the 2008 Putumayo compilation Euro Groove and was part of the set list of their 2007 live compilation Get On with It; the live version swapped out the original's sampling for live elements.

== Legacy ==
The song has been covered by Prague a capella group G*apeels, available on Chumbawamba's site. In December 2016, following Donald Trump's victory in the previous month's presidential election, "Jacob's Ladder (Not in My Name)" was included in a retrospective by Newsweek on "Bush-era protest music" and whether it "still hold(s) up". Zach Schonfeld concluded that the song was "no 'Tubthumping'".

== Track listings ==
Adapted from AllMusic.

1. "Jacob's Ladder (Not in My Name)"
2. "Jacob's Ladder (Albumesque)"
3. "Round 'Em Up and Throw 'Em In"

== See also ==
- List of anti-war songs
