= Drip Drip Drip =

Single by Chumbawamba

from the album Tubthumper
- B-side: "Drip Drip Drip (album version)"
- Released: 30 June 1998
- Genre: Pop rock, electropop
- Length: 5:08 (album version); 3:43 (single edit)
- Label: EMI (UK); Universal (US)
- Songwriter: Chumbawamba
- Producers: Chumbawamba, Neil Ferguson

Chumbawamba singles chronology
"Amnesia" (1998)	"Drip Drip Drip" (1998)	"Top of the World (Olé, Olé, Olé)" (1998)

"Drip Drip Drip" (sometimes stylised as "Drip, Drip, Drip") is a song by British alternative band Chumbawamba, from their eighth studio album, Tubthumper.

== Composition ==
"Drip Drip Drip" is an alternative rock song with a tempo of 105 beats per minute. It is written in the key of C. The album version of the song is five minutes and eight seconds in length, whereas the single version is three minutes and forty-three seconds long.

The song's lyrics have been noted for their "political subtext."

== Release ==
The song was initially included on the group's eighth studio album, Tubthumper. In May 1998, it was released as the third and final single from Tubthumper in the United States in 1998, as a follow-up to "Amnesia," which had reached number 1 on the United States' Bubbling Under Hot 100 chart on 9 May 1998. It was made available as a cassette single from Republic/Universal.

Whereas the group's two previous singles — "Tubthumping" and "Amnesia" — had peaked within the top 10 on the UK Singles Chart, "Drip Drip Drip" never charted in the United Kingdom.

Despite the failure of "Amnesia" on modern rock radio stations, Universal Records still released "Drip, Drip, Drip" to the stations; it received little play.

== Critical reception ==
Larry Flick of Billboard magazine called the song, which he thought "oozes with a political subtext" and was "clever," though he felt the song didn't have what it took to be a hit and that the "instrumental energy doesn't always quite match the intensity of the vocals and chants." The Virgin Encyclopedia of Nineties Music commented that the song, as well as "The Good Ship Lifestyle" and "Mary Mary", "lay(s) a strong bite in the lyric".

== Remix ==
The song was reworked on The ABCs of Anarchism. The new version, titled "Smelly Water" and remixed by experimental American band Negativland, discussed water pollution. On their official site, Negativland compared the song to "It's a Small World", writing that it's "where all the happy animatronic puppets are gasping for air and turning blue right before your very eyes as your little dinghy coasts you though pretty melodies, brown liquids and a very diSTINKt [sic] odor".
