= Amnesia (Chumbawamba song) =

1998 single by Chumbawamba

Single by Chumbawamba

from the album Tubthumper
- Released: 19 January 1998
- Studio: Woodlands (Castleford, UK)
- Length: 4:08
- Label: EMI
- Songwriter: Chumbawamba
- Producers: Chumbawamba; Neil Ferguson

Chumbawamba singles chronology
"Tubthumping" (1997)	"Amnesia" (1998)	"Drip, Drip, Drip" (1998)

"Amnesia" is the second single from English rock band Chumbawamba's eighth studio album, Tubthumper (1997). The song's lyrics address the sense of betrayal that English leftists felt during the rise of New Labour. Released on 19 January 1998 by EMI, the song was met with favorable reception from critics, who regarded the song as a highlight from Tubthumper.

The song was a top-10 hit in Canada and the United Kingdom, giving the group their final top-20 entries in both countries. The song also reached number one on the Billboard Bubbling Under Hot 100 Singles chart, becoming the group's final US chart entry. An accompanying music video was also released.

== Background and writing ==
"Amnesia" lyrically explores the dishonesty of politicians and the ignorance of voters who continue to vote them into office. Chumbawamba's Alice Nutter told MTV that the group "wrote "Amnesia" before the general election in England, and we basically wrote it about Blair's new labor [sic]," adding that the song has a universal message, noting that "people forget that what Bill Clinton says before he gets elected is not what Bill Clinton will do when he's in office, and that's not about Bill Clinton, that's about all politicians." The album version of the song ends with samples from a UK public service announcement on mad cow disease and the British comedy series Rising Damp.

== Release ==
The song was released as a CD single in the UK. A 12-inch single of the song was later released in the US, featuring "Tubthumping" as its B-side. A full-page ad featured in Spin magazine, for the song's parent album mentioned the inclusion of "Amnesia" on the album, was accompanied by partial lyrics.

== Reception ==
=== Critical ===
The song was well-received by music critics, many of whom felt the song was one of the better tracks on Tubthumper. Both music critic Robert Christgau and AllMusic's Stephen Thomas Erlewine noted "Amnesia", as well as "Tubthumping", as a highlight of Tubthumper. Larry Flick from Billboard wrote, "Can this group pull off a second hit? It may be a bit tricky duplicating the sales and radio heat of "Thubthumper", but Chumbawamba makes a respectable effort with this booming follow-up. The song lacks some of the magical immediacy of its predecessor, but it wears extremely well with repeated spins. In fact, by the second go round, you'll be bobbin' your head to the track's feel-good disco-fortified beat and chanting along with the song's oddly catchy "Do you suffer from long-term memory loss?" Ultimately, this is quirky good fun that deserves a fair shake." A reviewer from Music Week gave the single three out of five, adding, "The long-awaited follow-up to "Tubthumping" is marked by a flat verse which is made up for by a catchy radio-friendly singalong chorus."

=== Commercial ===
The song was a successful follow-up to "Tubthumping", reaching the top 10 in the United Kingdom and Canada. In Canada, "Amnesia" debuted on the RPM Top Singles chart on the issue dated 2 February 1998. It reached its number-seven peak on the chart dated 27 April. The song spent a total of 27 weeks in the Canadian Top 100. In the UK, the song was similarly successful, debuting and peaking at number 10 on the UK Singles Chart dated 31 January 1998.

In the United states, the song was somewhat successful, although it was far less so than "Tubthumping". Though the song failed to enter the Billboard Hot 100, it reached number one on the Bubbling Under Hot 100 Singles chart (the equivalent of number 101 on the Hot 100), spending two weeks overall on the chart. It also peaked at number 19 on the Mainstream Top 40 and number 38 on the Adult Top 40. The song was released to modern rock radio stations, on which "Tubthumping" had received much play; however, "Amnesia" was unsuccessful on that format.

== Music video ==
A music video was filmed for the song, with the band performing in a theatre for a packed audience and surrounded by dancers. As the performance progresses, intercut with shots of decaying/spoiling food, the spectators and band members begin to leave and a crew dismantles portions of the backdrop while others fall apart on their own. By the end of the song, only a janitor is present to watch vocalist Alice Nutter sing the final line on a darkened stage. The video was put into rotation on MTV Europe and MuchMusic.

== Track listings ==
- European single
1. "Amnesia" (single mix) (2:55) (minus other single mixes' lounge intro)
2. "Amnesia" (album version) (3:45 according to notes, 4:08 on disc) ("album version" includes album interstitial material but fades out at end)
3. "Amnesia" (acoustic version) (3:02)
4. "Amnesia" (Done Lying Down version) (3:40) (performed by Done Lying Down)
5. "Amnesia" (Jimmy Echo version) (2:45) (vocals by Jimmy Echo)
- UK CD1 single
1. "Amnesia" (single mix) (3:14)
2. "Amnesia" (Done Lying Down version) (3:40) (performed by Done Lying Down)
3. "Amnesia" (Jimmy Echo version) (2:45) (vocals by Jimmy Echo)
4. "Amnesia" (Zion Train 359 Amhurst Road mix) (7:42) (remix by Zion Train)
5. "Amnesia" (Decontrol remix) (5:52) (remix by Decontrol)
- UK CD2 single
1. "Amnesia" (single mix) (3:14)
2. "Tubthumping" (single mix) (3:34)
3. "Tubthumping" (Escape from New York mix) (6:24)
4. "Tubthumping" (Tin Tin Out mix) (4:53)
- US 12-inch single

A1. "Amnesia" (radio remix) (3:10)
A2. "Amnesia" (Zion Train 359 Amhurst Road mix) (7:42) (remix by Zion Train)
B1. "Amnesia" (Decontrol remix) (5:52) (remix by Decontrol)
B2. "Tubthumping" (Escape from New York's Full English Breakfast mix) (6:23)

- Japanese mini-album
1. "Amnesia" (single mix) (3:14)
2. "Tubthumping" (country & western version) (3:38)
3. "Mouthful of Shit" (country & western version) (2:56)
4. "One By One" (acoustic version) (3:12)
5. "Drip, Drip, Drip" (country & western version) (3:53)
6. "The Big Issue" (acoustic version) (3:39)
7. "Stitch That" (country & western version) (2:41)
8. "Amnesia" (acoustic version) (3:01)
9. "Amnesia" (Done Lying Down version) (performed by Done Lying Down) (3:39)
10. "Amnesia" (Jimmy Echo version) (vocals by Jimmy Echo) (2:45)

== Charts ==
=== Weekly charts ===
Weekly chart performance for "Amnesia"
Chart (1998)	Peak position
Australia (ARIA)	34
Belgium (Ultratip Bubbling Under Flanders)	15
Canada Top Singles (RPM)	7
Canada Adult Contemporary (RPM)	39
Estonia (Eesti Top 20)	9
Europe (Eurochart Hot 100)	27
Germany (GfK)	83
Iceland (Íslenski Listinn Topp 40)	31
Italy (Musica e dischi)	12
Italy Airplay (Music & Media)	2
Netherlands (Single Top 100)	96
Scottish Singles Sales (Official Charts)	12
UK Singles (Official Charts)	10
US Bubbling Under Hot 100 Singles (Billboard)	1
US Adult Top 40 (Billboard)	38
US Hot 100 Airplay (Billboard)	60
US Mainstream Top 40 (Billboard)	19

=== Year-end charts ===
Year-end chart performance for "Amnesia"
Chart (1998)	Position
Canada Top Singles (RPM)	69

== Release history ==
Release dates and formats for "Amnesia"
Region	Date	Format(s)	Label(s)	Ref.
United Kingdom	19 January 1998	CD; cassette	EMI	
United States	26 January 1998	Alternative radio	Universal; Republic	
Japan	6 February 1998	CD	EMI	
United States	21 April 1998	12-inch vinyl	Universal; Republic	

== Media usage ==
The radio edit of the song was included on the original TV soundtrack for Sabrina the Teenage Witch.
