= The Diggers' Song =

Song

- by Gerrard Winstanley
- Genre: Folk
- Form: Ballad
- Language: English
- Composed: 17th century, likely December 1649 or March 1650
- Published: 1894

"The Diggers' Song" (Roud 1521, also known as "Levellers and Diggers") is a 17th-century English ballad probably by Gerrard Winstanley, a protest song about land rights inspired by the Diggers movement. The lyrics were published in 1894 by the Camden Society. It is sung to a version of the family of tunes later used for "Sam Hall", "Captain Kidd", and "Admiral John Benbow", which according to Roy Palmer was first printed in 1714.

== Authorship and composition date ==
The historian Charles Harding Firth attributed the song's composition to Gerrard Winstanley, in whose printed works many of the verses are found. While acknowledging Winstanley as a plausible candidate for authorship, Ariel Hessayon also proposed the 'Digger Poet' Robert Coster as an alternative, citing stylistic similarities with Coster's known works.

Hessayon narrowed down the date of composition to either December 1649 or March 1650. The song was probably first written down at some point between March and May 1650, and was preserved in the papers of the Parliamentarian official William Clarke. Firth was responsible for its first publication in 1894, and was the first to give the song its modern title.

== Later versions ==
Chumbawamba released a version of Rosselson's composition on their 1993 single "Timebomb", sang "The Diggers' Song" in 1988 on their LP English Rebel Songs 1381–1914, and recorded it again in 2003 for the re-made CD English Rebel Songs 1381–1984. In 2007, they sang it on their CD Get On With It – Live.

According to Leon Rosselson his 1975 song "The World Turned Upside Down", (Note: Not to be confused with the 17th-century ballad of the same title) while a song about the Diggers, is not a version of Winstanley's "The Diggers' Song". Sung along with Roy Bailey, this song was one the pieces selected by Tony Benn when he appeared on BBC Radio 4's Desert Island Discs on 15 January 1989. However, Rosselson later recorded a version of "The Diggers' Song" (under the title "You Noble Diggers All") using the traditional lyrics and tune on his album Harry's Gone Fishing.

== Lyrics ==
You noble Diggers all, stand up now, stand up now,
You noble Diggers all, stand up now,
The wast land to maintain, seeing Cavaliers by name
Your digging does maintain, and persons all defame
Stand up now, stand up now.

Your houses they pull down, stand up now, stand up now,
Your houses they pull down, stand up now.
Your houses they pull down to fright your men in town,
But the gentry must come down, and the poor shall wear the crown.
Stand up now, Diggers all.

— Stanzas 1 & 2

== See also ==
- Levellers

== Bibliography ==
- Palmer, Roy (1979). A Ballad History of England: From 1588 to the Present Day. London: B. T. Blatsford. ISBN 978-0-7134-0968-0.
