= Jock Purdon =

British poet and songwriter

George "Jock" Purdon (16 November 1925 – 1998) was a British poet and songwriter.

Born in Nitshill near Glasgow, a former coal mining village whose mine had closed before Purdon grew up, by a strange twist of fate Jock Purdon spent most of his life as a coal miner in a pit in Chester-le-Street, County Durham. That occupation shaped his poems and songs and gave him the soubriquet "the miners' poet".

Purdon was almost 14 years old when World War II began, and he saw his older brother, Robert, enlist in the Royal Scots regiment, serving as a Commando until killed in France after the Normandy Landings in 1944. When it was his turn to be conscripted, Purdon's National Service number ended in 0, which meant that he would not be joining his brother in the army – he was bound for the pits (coal mines). Because of the labour shortage in 1943, 1 man in 10 (drawn by lot each week, according to the final digit of their number) was conscripted to make up the manpower needs of the coal mining industry, and Purdon was one of the first contingent designated for the mines on 14 December 1943, becoming a so-called "Bevin Boy". Ernest Bevin was the Minister of Labour and National Service in the wartime coalition cabinet.

Purdon married, stayed in Chester-le-Street after the war and worked in the pits digging coal in three foot seams with water up to his knees at times. He saw and shared the hardship of the miners; many of his songs reflect the sense of community that an embattled people develop. But it was not all doom and gloom. While The Easington Explosion laments the deaths of eighty one miners in one accident, Hally's Piebald Galloway laments the loss of the Lumley pit banner, eaten by a Galloway pony; ponies were used to haul coal carts underground.

Mining and politics are inseparable, and Purdon's verses captured his contempt for those who, in his view, put profit before people. He coined the word "Pitracide", meaning "to murder a pit for economic reasons". His commitment to his ideals and the mining community saw him performing his songs for the benefit of striking miners in the 1984–1985 miners' strike and appearing at the Royal Albert Hall in the "Concert for Heroes" in 1986. He is reported to have said, "For me there's three great generals – Geronimo, Alexander the Great and Arthur Scargill".

Purdon was featured on the Channel 4 Everyman TV series; six of his songs appear in Bert Lloyd's definitive collection of pit poems and songs, Come All Ye Bold Miners and he published a radical album of poems and songs entitled Pitworks, Politics & Poetry. In 2004 the Cotia banner (subject of one of Purdon's songs) was remade and carried to the Durham Miners' Gala with pictures of Purdon and fellow miner and folksinger Jack Elliot of Birtley on the back. The banner was unfurled by Tony Benn, who was an admirer of Purdon's poetry and songs.
