= Enough Is Enough (Chumbawamba and Credit to the Nation song) =

Single by Chumbawamba and Credit to the Nation

from the album Anarchy
- Released: 1993
- Recorded: June 1993
- Genre: Reggae fusion; conscious hip hop; alternative rock; post-punk; anarcho-punk
- Label: One Little Indian (UK, 1993)

Chumbawamba and Credit to the Nation singles chronology
"(Someone's Always Telling You How To) Behave" (1992)	"Enough Is Enough" (1993)	"Timebomb" (1993)

Enough Is Enough is an anti-fascist protest single from Chumbawamba and Credit to the Nation, on Chumbawamba's album Anarchy. It reached #56 on UK charts in 1993 and was supported by a music video.

== History ==
The b-side, "Hear No Bullshit (On Fire Mix)", is a remix of the Credit to the Nation single "Hear No Bullshit See No Bullshit Say No Bullshit" released the same year, and samples Chumbawamba's Song "Mouthful of Shit" from their album Anarchy.

== Commercial performance ==
The song gave Chumbawamba their first entry on the UK Singles Chart. It debuted on the chart dated 18 September 1993, at number 56; the following week, it fell to number 64. The song remained their highest-charting in the UK until "Tubthumping" peaked at number 2 on the chart four years later.

== "Enough is Enough (Kick it Over)" ==
In July 2000, the band recorded a version of the song featuring new topical lyrics, called 'Enough Is Enough (Kick It Over)', and gave away a one-track CD of it at their shows in Austria. This followed the formation of a coalition government including the FPÖ, a party led by Austrian politician and Nazi apologist Jörg Haider, who later that year stepped down from direct control of the party due to international pressure. This version contains an interpolation of Willi Williams' reggae song "Armagideon Time", from which the phrase "kick it over" is drawn. This version of the song was also performed at the band's final gig and appears on the live DVD Going, Going – Live at Leeds City Varieties.

== Track listing ==
1. Enough Is Enough (4:35)
2. Hear No Bullshit (On Fire Mix) (4:20)
3. The Day The Nazi Died (1993 Mix) (2:38)
