= Swingin' with Raymond =

Studio album by Chumbawamba
- Released: 23 October 1995
- Recorded: 1995
- Studio: Woodlands (Castleford); The Wyndings (Wrexham)
- Genre: Folk; anarcho-punk
- Length: 46:30
- Label: One Little Indian
- Producer: Chumbawamba

Chumbawamba chronology
Showbusiness! (1994)	Swingin' with Raymond (1995)	Tubthumper (1997)

Singles from Swingin' with Raymond
- 1. "Ugh! Your Ugly Houses!" Released: 1995; 2. "Just Look at Me Now" Released: 1996

Professional ratings
Review scores
Source	Rating
AllMusic	3/5 stars

Swingin' with Raymond is the seventh studio album by anarchist punk band Chumbawamba. The album cover features a photograph of Raymond Mills.

== Musical style ==
The first half (tracks 1–6), entitled "Love It", features folk-styled love songs, sung by Lou Watts and featuring acoustic guitars and violin; Chris Nickson, an Allmusic critic, described the first half of the album as "ironic," commenting that the songs are "about the love of ideas -- even love itself becomes an idea." The second half (tracks 7–13), entitled "Hate It", features the other vocalists, faster rhythms, trumpet and louder guitars; Nickson felt that the second half contained "strong melodies and choruses." To complement the disparity between the two halves, the cover features a man on the album with "LOVE" and "HATE" tattooed on his knuckles. Some versions of the LP featured two separate discs, one for each part.

== Critical reception ==
The album was met with mixed to positive reviews from critics. AllMusic's Chris Nickson felt that, although the instrumentation occasionally overpowers the lyrics, the album as a whole is artistically successful, concluding that "once again, pop meets politics and, as has to be the case with any good anarchist collective, the politics win -- but you can still think and dance while you listen."

== Chart performance ==
The album was less successful in the UK than its predecessor, Anarchy, which had entered the top 40. Swingin' with Raymond peaked at number 70 on the UK Albums Chart, spending only one week on the tally.

== Track listing ==
All tracks are written by Chumbawamba.

"Love It"
No.	Title	Length
1.	"This Girl"	3:44
2.	"Never Let Go"	4:03
3.	"Just Look at Me Now"	3:22
4.	"Not the Girl I Used to Be"	4:02
5.	"The Morning After (The Night Before)"	3:33
6.	"Love Can Knock You Over"	3:33

"Hate It"
No.	Title	Length
7.	"All Mixed Up"	4:08
8.	"This Dress Kills"	3:31
9.	"Salome (Let's Twist Again)"	3:50
10.	"Oxymoron"	3:36
11.	"Waiting, Shouting"	2:55
12.	"Hey! You! Outside Now!"	3:52
13.	"Ugh! Your Ugly Houses!"	2:21
Total length:		46:30

== Personnel ==
- Lou Watts
- Harry Hamer
- Paul Greco
- Boff Whalley
- Dunstan Bruce
- Mavis Dillon
- Danbert Nobacon
- Alice Nutter
- Dee Scholey – Violin on love songs
- Simon Commonknowledge – Extra vocals on "Salome"
- Babs Fox st The FFRWD – Live tape in middle of "Salome"

== Charts ==
1995 weekly chart performance for Swingin' with Raymond
Chart (1995)	Peak position
UK Albums (OCC)	70
