= Homophobia (song) =

1994 song by Chumbawamba

Single by Chumbawamba featuring the Sisters of Perpetual Indulgence

from the album Anarchy
- Released: 23 May 1994
- Recorded: March 1994
- Studio: Woodlands Studio (Castleford)
- Genre: Folk
- Length: 4:35
- Label: One Little Indian
- Songwriter: Chumbawamba
- Producers: Boff Whalley; Harry Hamer; Neil Ferguson

Chumbawamba singles chronology
"Timebomb" (1993)	"Homophobia" (1994)	"Ugh! Your Ugly Houses!" (1995)

"Homophobia" is a song by English rock band Chumbawamba from their sixth studio album Anarchy (1994). A remixed version of the song featuring the Sisters of Perpetual Indulgence, titled the "Sisters Mix" was released as the third single from the album in 1994. Concerning the topic of modern homophobia, the song remained a regular part of Chumbawamba's live set from its initial release in 1994 up to the band's retirement in 2012. Live recordings of the song are featured on Chumbawamba's two live albums Showbusiness! and Get On with It.

The Sisters Mix of "Homophobia" received a music video in 1994, featuring a choir of the Sisters of Perpetual Indulgence members. This version of the song is sonically different from the album version, having an upbeat synthesized backing and altered lyrics. The physical release of the single featured four B-sides, including "Enough Is Enough", "Morality Play in Three Acts", "The Day the Nazi Died", and "Song for Derek Jarman". The last is a heavily reworked version of "Rage", a song taken from Chumbawamba's Anarchy album.

== Track listings and formats ==
- UK CD 1
1. "Homophobia" (Sisters mix) featuring the Sisters of Perpetual Indulgence – 4:34
2. "Enough Is Enough" – 4:37
3. "Morality Play in Three Acts" – 4:07
4. "The Day the Nazi Died" – 2:38
- UK CD 2
1. "Homophobia" (Sisters mix) featuring the Sisters of Perpetual Indulgence – 4:35
2. "Morality Play in Three Acts" – 4:08
3. "Homophobia" (live a cappella) – 3:12
4. "Song for Derek Jarman" – 5:46

== Charts ==
Weekly charts
Chart (1994)	Peak position
Israel (IBA)	1
UK Singles (Official Charts)	79

Year-end charts
Chart (1994)	Position
Israel (IBA)	47
