= Anarchy (Chumbawamba album) =

Studio album by Chumbawamba
- Released: 25 April 1994
- Recorded: January 1994
- Genres: Alternative rock; anarcho-punk; pop
- Length: 41:32
- Label: One Little Indian/London
- Producers: Chumbawamba, Neil Ferguson

Chumbawamba chronology
Shhh (1992)	Anarchy (1994)	Showbusiness! (1994)

Singles from Anarchy
- 1. "Enough Is Enough" Released: 1993; 2. "Timebomb" Released: 1994; 3. "Homophobia" Released: 1994

Alternative cover
- Alternative cover used in Japan and by Apple Music and Spotify due to the graphic nature of the original cover

Anarchy is the sixth studio album by British anarcho-punk band Chumbawamba. Many of the tracks address specific social issues, such as homophobia, strikes or fascism.

Its graphic cover, depicting a baby's head emerging from a vagina, prompted the record to be banned from some shops and stocked in plain sleeves in others. The Spotify and iTunes version, as well as the Japanese physical edition of the album, replaces the baby picture with a painting of red roses.

== Critical reception ==
Professional ratings
Review scores
Source	Rating
Allmusic	3/5 stars
Robert Christgau	(2-star Honorable Mention)
Select	2/5

In a review for AllMusic, Chris Nickson praised the album's "intelligence" and stylistic diversity, but the album was only awarded three stars. Music critic Robert Christgau regarded the album as "transient punk-style agitprop with announcements," awarding the album two honourable mention stars, and praising "Timebomb" and "Mouthful of Shit" as highlights. Gina Morris gave it 2 out of 5 in the June 1994 issue of Select and called it "disappointingly uninspired, pretty rather than poignant and flooded with lame clichés and, for the most part, feeble subjects."

== Commercial performance ==
The album was a commercial success, giving the group their first top-40 album on the UK Albums Chart. The album debuted and peaked at number 29 on the chart dated 7 May 1994; it spent a total of three weeks on the chart before exiting the top 100.

== Track listing ==
All tracks are written by Chumbawamba.

No.	Title	Length
1.	"Give the Anarchist a Cigarette"	4:07
2.	"Timebomb"	3:41
3.	"Homophobia"	2:31
4.	"On Being Pushed"	0:31
5.	"Heaven/Hell"	2:26
6.	"Love Me"	3:51
7.	"Georgina"	2:26
8.	"Doh!"	0:21
9.	"Blackpool Rock"	0:28
10.	"This Year's Thing"	4:06
11.	"Mouthful of Shit"	3:45
12.	"Never Do What You Are Told"	1:22
13.	"Bad Dog"	4:31
14.	"Enough Is Enough" (featuring Credit to the Nation)	4:34
15.	"Rage"	2:50

Japanese edition bonus track
No.	Title	Length
16.	"Homophobia" (Sisters Mix)	4:35

== Song details ==
- The title of Give The Anarchist A Cigarette comes from a scene in the Bob Dylan documentary Dont Look Back in which Dylan's manager Albert Grossman tells him "They're calling you an anarchist now", to which Dylan replies "Give the anarchist a cigarette".
- The line "give the fascist man a gunshot" from Enough is Enough was referenced by Asian Dub Foundation in their song "TH9".
- The lyrics to Georgina reference the Peter Greenaway movie The Cook, the Thief, His Wife & Her Lover
- The title to the track "Doh!" is named after the catchphrase used by the cartoon character Homer Simpson. The catchphrase is heard at the end of the track.

== Personnel ==
Chumbawamba

- Harry Hamer
- Danbert Nobacon
- Paul Greco
- Lou Watts
- Dunstan Bruce
- Boff Whalley
- Alice Nutter
- Mavis Dillon

Additional personnel

- Neil Ferguson
- MC Fusion
- Simon "Commonknowledge" Lanzon - Accordion
- Kerry and Casey - "Georgina" intro
- Geoff Reid - Mandolin
