= Tubthumping =

1997 single by Chumbawamba

Single by Chumbawamba

from the album Tubthumper
- B-side: "Farewell to the Crown"; "Football Song" ("Shit Ground, No Fans...")
- Released: 11 August 1997
- Studio: Woodlands (Castleford)
- Genre: Dance-rock; alternative rock; dance-punk
- Length: 4:38 (album version); 3:33 (radio edit/video version)
- Label: EMI; Universal; Republic
- Songwriter: Chumbawamba
- Producer: Chumbawamba

Chumbawamba singles chronology
"Just Look at Me Now" (1996)	"Tubthumping" (1997)	"Amnesia" (1998)

Audio sample
- file; help

Music video
- "Tubthumping" on YouTube

"Tubthumping" is a song by British rock band Chumbawamba, released in August 1997 by EMI Records as the first single from their eighth studio album, Tubthumper (1997). Written and produced by the band, it is their most successful single, peaking at number two on the UK Singles Chart and topping the charts of Australia, Canada, Ireland, Italy and New Zealand. In the United States, it reached number six on the Billboard Hot 100 and topped three other Billboard charts. At the 1998 Brit Awards, "Tubthumping" was nominated for the Brit Award for Best British Single.

== Background ==
The song was the group's lead single from Tubthumper, their major-label debut. It was released on 11 August 1997. Vocalist Dunstan Bruce retrospectively observed that, before the group wrote it, they "were in a mess: we had become directionless and disparate". He credited "Tubthumping" with changing that, telling The Guardian, "It's not our most political or best song, but it brought us back together. The song is about us – as a class and as a band. The beauty of it was we had no idea how big it would be."

== Writing and composition ==
A Leeds pub named the Fforde Grene served as the group's inspiration for the song. Guitarist Boff Whalley told The Guardian that it was written about "the resilience of ordinary people"; musically, "Tubthumping" is a dance-rock, alternative rock, and dance-punk song in D major. The intro to the song includes an excerpt from the British film Brassed Off.

In 2024, after the song was used by New Zealand politicians deemed to be anti-liberal, Whalley said, "Let me be clear: the song 'Tubthumping' was written to celebrate the resilience and tenacity of working-class folk who keep fighting when the chips are down. It has nothing whatsoever in common with wealthy politicians with extremist anti-liberal agendas. ...The right doesn't have any good songs. That's why they keep trying to nick ours."

In her trumpet solo, Jude Abbott interpolates the notable Trumpet Voluntary, written by Jeremiah Clarke in about 1700.

== Music video ==
The music video was directed by Ben Unwin. The video opens in a pub. The camera zooms past the clients, who appear to be frozen, and zooms in onto the small television on which the band are performing, dressed in black casual clothes, on a small stage in front of a red curtain which occasionally turns green. The video continues with the band appearing in the pub, intercut with shots of female clients applying make-up and chatting in the ladies' lavatory.

== Critical reception ==
Larry Flick from Billboard magazine wrote, "Some records just demand attention: 'Tubthumping' is one of the rare few. You can spend three times the track's running time plucking out the seemingly disparate sounds and assorted genre references—starting with the forceful alterna-rock guitar scratches, the hip-hop-derived beats, and the swing-style horns. Holding it all together are the kind of rousing, gang-like chants that you hear at football games. Sounds odd, eh? Well, you won't soon forget this jam after first listen. And you'll likely be hearing it on pop and modern rock stations for months to come. If this gem is indicative of the tone of the act's forthcoming album, it should be quite a head trip." A reviewer from Daily Record described it as an "irritating catchy drinking anthem from the anarchist band". It was also named a "raucous anthem". Pan-European magazine Music & Media said, "After a decade and a half spent as indie heroes this collective is likely to break into the mainstream in a big way". Music Week gave the song a score of four out of five, noting that it "combines their unique sound with a very infectious chant that could have come from the terraces. Radio One's Simon Mayo has been heavily championing the song which should prove to be their biggest hit to date." Ian Hyland of the Sunday Mirror rated it eight out of ten, writing, "Sing a terrace chant, mention lager and the rugby boys will be making boozed-up human pyramids on the dance floor in seconds. And you'll have a monster hit – good work, chum." Troy J. Augusto from Variety named it a "drinking-and-dancing anthem" and "the quirk hit of the season".

In The Village Voice's Pazz & Jop poll for 1997, "Tubthumping" was voted the second-best single of the year. Australian radio station Triple J ranked it No. 3 in its Triple J Hottest 100 for the same year. Author Bruce Pollock included it in his 2005 book "The 7,500 Most Important Songs of 1944–2000". "Tubthumping" also placed at No. 12 in Rolling Stone's 2007 list of the "20 Most Annoying Songs" and at No. 8 in the magazine's 2011 list of the "Top 10 One-Hit Wonders of All Time". In 2017, Billboard ranked it No. 38 in their list of "The 100 Greatest Pop Songs of 1997".

== Commercial performance ==
Upon its release, the song became an international hit. On the UK Singles Chart, it debuted at number two on the chart dated 23 August 1997; it spent three consecutive weeks at number two, held off the top spot by Will Smith's "Men in Black." The song spent 11 consecutive weeks in the top 10, and 20 consecutive weeks on the top 100. On the chart dated 24 January 1998, three weeks after its last week on the chart, the song reentered the singles chart at number 88; the next week, it fell to number 96 before exiting the chart.

In the US, the song debuted on the Billboard Hot 100 dated 13 September 1997, at number 79. The next week, it rose to number 63, attaining the week's biggest gain in airplay. Two weeks later, on the chart dated 4 October 1997, the song was again the biggest airplay gainer of the week, entering the top 40 in its rise from 47 to 35. In its 12th week on the chart, 29 November 1997, the song reached its peak of number six, where it spent two weeks In total, it spent 31 weeks on the Billboard Hot 100. Its use in a television commercial for Home Alone 3 reportedly increased album sales. Radio was the primary fuel for its chart run, as it was number-one on the Hot 100 Airplay chart for nine weeks while never making the sales component chart. Instead, a knock-off cover from "Chucklebutt" lasted on the sales chart for two weeks, its debut position of 69 also being its peak.

The single was also present on many year-end singles charts for 1997. In the UK, it ranked as the year's seventh most-popular single, while it placed at number three on Australia's top 100 songs of the year. The single also placed in the top 20 of the year-end chart in Sweden and in the top 100 of 1997 in Belgium, Canada, Germany, the Netherlands, New Zealand, and the United States. In the US, it placed at number 35 on the Billboard Hot 100's year-end ranking for 1998.

The song was also used in the soundtrack of the Electronic Arts game World Cup 98.

== Track listings and formats ==
- UK CD single
1. "Tubthumping" – 3:33
2. "Tubthumping" (Butthumping mix, remixed by ISM) – 5:24
3. "Tubthumping" (Danny Boy mix) – 5:37
4. "Tubthumping" (MAWR mix/Pablo & Lawrie) – 5:10
5. "Tubthumping" (Timeshard mix) – 4:57
6. "Tubthumping" (Gunshot mix) – 5:17
- UK 7-inch single

A1. "Tubthumping" – 3:33
B1. "Farewell to the Crown" (featuring the Oysterband) – 2:58
B2. "Football Song" ("Shit Ground, No Fans...") – 2:26

- UK cassette single
1. "Tubthumping" – 3:33
2. "Tubthumping" (Butthumping mix) – 5:24
3. "Tubthumping" (Danny Boy mix) – 5:37
- European CD single
1. "Tubthumping" – 3:37
2. "Farewell to the Crown" (featuring the Oysterband) – 2:55
- US and Australian CD single
1. "Tubthumping" (original mix) – 3:33
2. "Farewell to the Crown" (featuring the Oysterband) – 2:58
3. "Football Song" ("Shit Ground, No Fans...") – 2:26
4. "Tubthumping" (Butthumping mix, remixed by ISM) – 5:24
5. "Tubthumping" (Danny Boy mix, remixed by the Dr Quantize Clinic) – 5:37
- US 7-inch single

A. "Tubthumping"
B. "Amnesia"

- US 12-inch single

A1. "Tubthumping" (MAWR mix/Pablo & Lawrie) – 5:10
A2. "Tubthumping" (original mix) – 3:33
B1. "Tubthumping" (Timeshard mix) – 4:57
B2. "Tubthumping" (Gunshot mix) – 5:17

== Charts ==
=== Weekly charts ===
Chart (1997–1998)	Peak position
Australia (ARIA)	1
Austria (Ö3 Austria Top 40)	14
Belgium (Ultratop 50 Flanders)	9
Belgium (Ultratop 50 Wallonia)	30
Canada Top Singles (RPM)	1
Canada Adult Contemporary (RPM)	1
Canada Rock/Alternative (RPM)	1
Denmark (IFPI)	9
Estonia (Eesti Top 20)	4
Europe (Eurochart Hot 100)	8
Europe (European Hit Radio)	3
France (SNEP)	38
Germany (GfK)	11
Hungary (Mahasz)	5
Iceland (Íslenski Listinn Topp 40)	10
Ireland (IRMA)	1
Israel (IBA)	3
Italy (Musica e dischi)	1
Netherlands (Dutch Top 40)	10
Netherlands (Single Top 100)	16
New Zealand (Recorded Music NZ)	1
Norway (VG-lista)	2
Poland Airplay (Music & Media)	4
Scottish Singles Sales (Official Charts)	1
Sweden (Sverigetopplistan)	6
Switzerland (Schweizer Hitparade)	14
UK Singles (Official Charts)	2
US Billboard Hot 100	6
US Adult Top 40 (Billboard)	1
US Mainstream Top 40 (Billboard)	1
US Maxi-Singles Sales (Billboard)	36
US Modern Rock Tracks (Billboard)	1
US Rhythmic Top 40 (Billboard)	15

Chart (2025)	Peak position
Poland (Polish Airplay Top 100)	72

=== Year-end charts ===
Chart (1997)	Position
Australia (ARIA)	3
Belgium (Ultratop 50 Flanders)	61
Canada Top Singles (RPM)	24
Canada Adult Contemporary (RPM)	57
Canada Rock/Alternative (RPM)	10
Europe (Eurochart Hot 100)	32
Europe (European Hit Radio)	9
Germany (Media Control)	69
Iceland (Íslenski Listinn Topp 40)	36
Netherlands (Dutch Top 40)	77
Netherlands (Single Top 100)	76
New Zealand (RIANZ)	32
Norway (VG-lista)	6
Romania (Romanian Top 100)	93
Sweden (Topplistan)	20
UK Singles (OCC)	9
US Billboard Hot 100	69
US Modern Rock Tracks (Billboard)	37
US Top 40/Mainstream (Billboard)	49

Chart (1998)	Position
Australia (ARIA)	46
Canada Top Singles (RPM)	43
Canada Adult Contemporary (RPM)	46
US Billboard Hot 100	35
US Adult Top 40 (Billboard)	25
US Mainstream Top 40 (Billboard)	23
US Modern Rock Tracks (Billboard)	45
US Rhythmic Top 40 (Billboard)	80

== Certifications ==
Region	Certification	Certified units/sales
Australia (ARIA)	2× Platinum	140,000^{^}
New Zealand (RMNZ)	Platinum	30,000^{‡}
Norway (IFPI Norway)	Platinum	
Sweden (GLF)	Gold	15,000^{^}
United Kingdom (BPI)	2× Platinum	1,200,000^{‡}
^{^} Shipments figures based on certification alone.^{‡} Sales+streaming figures based on certification alone.

== Release history ==
Region	Date	Format(s)	Label(s)	Ref(s).
United Kingdom	11 August 1997	7-inch vinyl; CD; cassette	EMI	
United States	15 September 1997	Alternative radio	Universal; Republic	
United States	7 October 1997	Contemporary hit radio	Universal; Republic	

== "Tubthumping" (2003 remix) ==
"Tubthumping" (remix)

Single by Chumbawamba

from the album Readymades and Then Some (bonus DVD)
- B-side: "Salt Fare, North Sea"; "Jacob's Ladder (Not in My Name)"
- Released: 2003
- Label: Koch

Chumbawamba singles chronology
"Jacob's Ladder (Not in My Name)" (2002)	"Tubthumping" (remix) (2003)	"Home with Me" (2003)

"Tubthumping (remix)" was released in 2003 as a promotional CD by Chumbawamba on Koch Records. The remixed version of the song was done by The Flaming Lips and Dave Fridmann.

The single was released promotionally by Mutt Records, with their previous single, "Jacob's Ladder (Not in My Name)", as a B-side. It was also included on the bonus DVD accompanying Readymades and Then Some, the rerelease of their 2002 album Readymades. Stereogum also made the song available as a free MP3 download in June 2004.

== Legacy ==
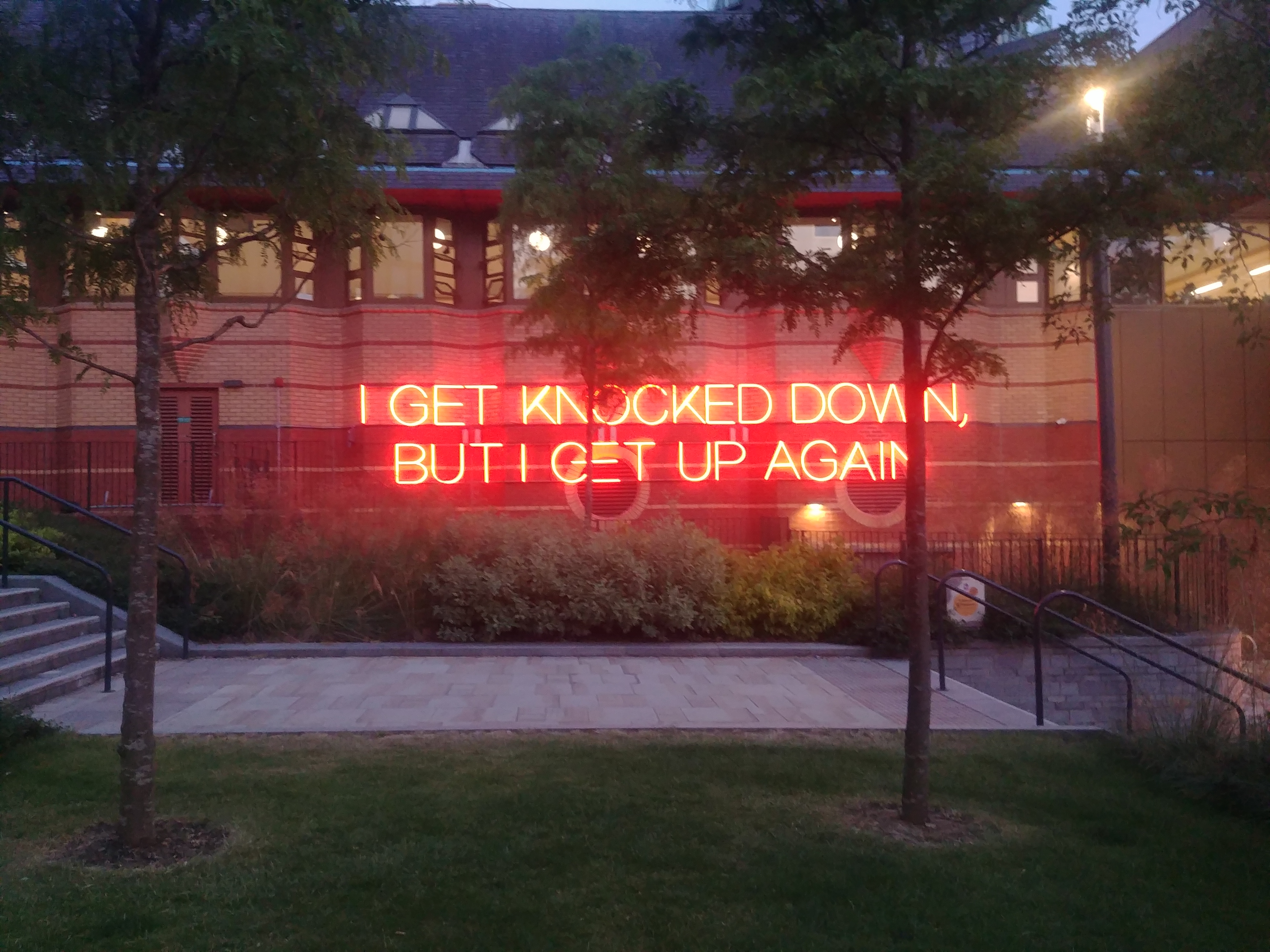
Neon sculpture at Leeds Playhouse with the words "I get knocked down, but I get up again"

A neon sculpture on the Leeds Playhouse features the lyric "I get knocked down but I get up again". During the COVID-19 pandemic in Leeds, the song was given a remix by local young musicians and sportspeople.

Alternative rock band They Might Be Giants covered "Tubthumping" for The A.V. Club's A.V. Undercover series, and included on the compilation album Album Raises New and Troubling Questions.

In 2024, New Zealand deputy prime minister Winston Peters used the song at a political rally for his right wing party New Zealand First. Chumbawamba accused Peters of hijacking the song and asked their record label to issue a cease and desist letter. Peters responded on Twitter, "there's nothing to 'cease or desist'. [...] The song worked like a charm for our first public meeting after the election. The over 700 people in the crowd thought so too."

== See also ==
- List of number-one singles in Australia during the 1990s
- List of RPM number-one alternative rock singles
- List of number-one singles of 1997 (Ireland)
- List of number-one singles from the 1990s (New Zealand)
- List of Billboard Mainstream Top 40 number-one songs of the 1990s
- List of Adult Top 40 number-one songs of the 1990s
