= Tubthumper =

Studio album by Chumbawamba
- Released: 1 September 1997
- Recorded: August 1996 – February 1997
- Studio: Woodlands Studio (Castleford)
- Genres: Power pop; pop rock; dance-pop; alternative rock
- Length: 58:49
- Labels: EMI; Universal; Republic
- Producers: Chumbawamba; Neil Ferguson

Chumbawamba chronology
Swingin' with Raymond (1995)	Tubthumper (1997)	Uneasy Listening (1998)

Singles from Tubthumper
- 1. "Tubthumping" Released: 11 August 1997; 2. "Amnesia" Released: January 1998; 3. "Drip, Drip, Drip" Released: 30 June 1998

Tubthumper is the eighth studio album and the major label debut by English rock band Chumbawamba, released on 1 September 1997 by EMI. The album was written and produced by Chumbawamba, with additional production from Neil Ferguson. A musical departure from the group's anarcho-punk roots, the album incorporates elements of pop rock, dance-pop, power pop and alternative rock. Thematically, the album acts as a social commentary on a variety of political issues, particularly that of class conflict. Tubthumper was promoted with three singles: "Tubthumping", "Amnesia", and "Drip, Drip, Drip". "Top of the World (Olé, Olé, Olé)", a standalone single previously featured on the official music compilation album for the 1998 FIFA World Cup, was included on a European reissue of Tubthumper.

Tubthumper received generally positive reviews from music critics, who noted it as a sonically distinctive record, in addition to praising its subtle social commentary. Following the international commercial success of lead single "Tubthumping", the album peaked at number three in the United States and within the top ten in several other countries. The album's release was met with several controversies, including controversial comments in interviews by group vocalist Alice Nutter and allegations of the band selling out after signing to a major label. Tubthumper remains as Chumbawamba's most successful album, having sold over 3.2 million units in the United States alone.

== Background and release ==
Sessions for Tubthumper spanned from August 1996 through February 1997 at Woodlands Studio in Castleford, West Yorkshire, England. The album was written and produced by Chumbawamba, with additional production from Neil Ferguson. Approximately twenty songs were written for the album, with the group choosing to pursue a more mainstream sound entailing elements of pop rock, dance-pop, and alternative rock. The album resulted in a stalemate between Chumbawamba and their record label, One Little Indian Records, with the latter rejecting the record in opposition to the group's new sound. As a result, Chumbawamba parted ways with the label, then signing with EMI in England and Universal Music Group in the United States. The group intended to reach a larger audience with their music by signing with a major record label.

The album catapulted the group into the mainstream, released by EMI in the UK and in the US by Universal Records, and was noted for its departure from the group's typical style of outspoken punk rock in favour of a more mainstream sound. The album's title refers to "Someone who stands on a soapbox on the street corner and shouts what's wrong with the world". The cover for the album was designed by Michael Calleia at Industrial Strength Design in New York City. The cover was loosely based on the album cover for the group's 1994 album Anarchy, with the group commenting, "the anarchy baby was just being born on Anarchy, and we thought it should be eight months to a year old with a bit of attitude on Tubthumper."

== Composition ==
A recurring lyrical theme on Tubthumper is social commentary, in particular class conflict. However, critic Elisabeth Vincentelli opined that the group had "toned down some of the radical rhetoric", and that the album's lyrics, where they were previously had a "brusque directness", Tubthumper contained "oblique pathos".

The song "One by One" has been described as an "elegiac tale of treachery" committed by politicians. "The Good Ship Lifestyle" criticises "lifestylism", which the group defined as the "practice of wrapping yourself in a blinkered, self-perfecting, ideologically-sound cocoon", telling other people how to live their lives but not abiding those rules oneself.

Tubthumper incorporates a number of musical styles, including synth-pop, hip hop, jungle, and madrigals. The album was noted for its presence of trumpet solos. Music critic Greg Kot likened the album's catchiness to that of the Spice Girls. An album review by Rolling Stone compared the musical style of "Smalltown" to that of British alternative group Everything But the Girl, while deeming the album's overall genre "radio-friendly dance pop". The Los Angeles Times concurred that the album was dance-pop.

== Critical reception ==
Professional ratings
Review scores
Source	Rating
AllMusic	4.5/5 stars
Chicago Tribune	3/4 stars
Christgau's Consumer Guide	(3-star Honorable Mention)
Encyclopedia of Popular Music	4/5 stars
Entertainment Weekly	B+
Los Angeles Times	2/4 stars
Music Week	4/5 stars
NME	6/10
Rolling Stone	3/5 stars
The Rolling Stone Album Guide	3/5 stars

Tubthumper garnered praise from critics upon its release. Writing for AllMusic, Stephen Thomas Erlewine called it a "distinctive" album, concluding that "there's a handful of cuts scattered throughout the record that make the album worthwhile." Entertainment Weekly's Tom Lanham wrote that "social commentary never tasted so sweet" and awarded the album a "B+". Greg Kot, writing for the Chicago Tribune, praised the album and commented that the group "sounds way too smart to be so easily dismissed". He went on to call the album "twice as catchy... and four times as riotously subversive" as the Spice Girls' music.

Some critics were more lukewarm in their assessments of the album, however: Rolling Stone's Elisabeth Vincentelli awarded the album 3 stars and opined that the album's lyrics "have traded the brusque directness of yore for oblique pathos", though she did go on to praise "Smalltown" as being "coolly collected" and "Tubthumping" as having "a fist-in-the-air quality that would work equally well at a union rally and in an arena." She concluded that the album "may not enlighten the masses, but it'll make them dance". Music critic Robert Christgau awarded the album a 3-star honourable mention rating and cited "Tubthumping" and "Amnesia" as highlights, with the note "Tub as platform, tub as cornucopia, tub as slop bucket".

== Commercial performance ==
Tubthumper was Chumbawamba's most successful album in several respects. It spawned the worldwide hit "Tubthumping", which was a top 10 hit in the US, the UK, Sweden, Norway, and Belgium, and a number 1 hit in Canada, Italy, Ireland, and Australia. The follow-up single, "Amnesia", also proved a commercial success, managing to reach the top 10 in the UK and Canada. The album spawned a third single, "Drip Drip Drip", which failed to make an impression on any international chart but was met with positive critical reception.

The album became a commercial success. In the United States, it hit number 3 on the Billboard 200 and sold more than 3,200,000 copies, thanks in large part to the success of "Tubthumping;" Canada, where the album reached number 2; and the UK, where the album reached number 19. The album also placed at number 17 on the American tally of top-selling albums of 1997. Tubthumper remains the group's highest-charting album in all three territories; its sales in the US stand at 3,200,000.

== Controversies ==
=== Signing to a major label ===
The group's decision to sign with a major record label caused a huge upheaval in Chumbawamba's fan base, with many of their older fans feeling the band had trivialised all that they had stood for in signing to EMI. The band was targeted by many as being sell-outs and hypocrites, after having been sternly do-it-yourself for their fifteen-year history up until that point.

The band defended their decision on their official FAQ page, issuing a statement that read, in part: "We signed to EMI/Universal not because we'd been co-opted into the 'If you can't beat capitalism ... join it' school of thought, but because experience had taught us that in a capitalist environment almost every record company operates on capitalist principles. Our previous record label One Little Indian didn't have the evil symbolic significance of EMI BUT they were completely motivated by profit. Our [Chumbawamba's] position was that whoever we signed with would want us not for our ideas but for the potential profit, so we'd battle for a contract where we still had autonomy."

=== Alice Nutter interview ===
In early 1998, group vocalist Alice Nutter made an appearance on the American television show Politically Incorrect to promote the album. During the interview, she appeared to encourage fans who were unable to afford Tubthumper to steal it from big chain music stores like HMV and Virgin. Her statement led several music retailers to stop carrying the album altogether. In the United States, following the interview, Virgin Megastores pulled the album from store shelves, while the album was number 7 on the US album chart; the company continued to sell the album, but kept it behind the counter. Virgin's Vice-President of Marketing issued a statement about the incident, which said that the company did not genuinely believe fans would steal the disc, but that the company wanted to make a statement: "We were one of the earliest supporters of the band...We've been pushing the band since the beginning, and this is the kind of thanks we get?"

Nutter maintained that her comments had been taken out of context, and that they were "tongue-in-cheek" and not to be taken seriously. She told MTV in a January 1998 interview that "They wanted to talk about people stealing our record, which is irrelevant in the scheme of things. What I wanted to talk about was why people shoplift and why in some cases it's absolutely valid. Some people have two houses and two cars and luxuries for far more than themselves, and other people struggle to survive day by day." The ensuing controversy also served to stoke the public's interest in the album.

== Track listing ==
All tracks are written by Chumbawamba.

No.	Title	Length
1.	"Tubthumping"	4:38
2.	"Amnesia"	4:08
3.	"Drip, Drip, Drip"	5:08
4.	"The Big Issue"	4:37
5.	"The Good Ship Lifestyle"	5:13
6.	"One by One"	5:45
7.	"Outsider"	4:08
8.	"Creepy Crawling"	4:03
9.	"Mary, Mary"	4:58
10.	"Smalltown"	3:13
11.	"I Want More"	4:01
12.	"Scapegoat"	5:15

European edition bonus track
No.	Title	Length
13.	"Top of the World (Olé, Olé, Olé)"	3:49

Japanese edition bonus tracks
No.	Title	Length
13.	"Farewell to the Crown"	2:56
14.	"Football Song"	2:25
15.	"Seven Days"	4:07
16.	"May Day"	3:51

Notes

- "Tubthumping" and "Scapegoat" contain sampled excerpts from the 1996 film Brassed Off, as spoken by Pete Postlethwaite.
- "Amnesia" contains sampled excerpts from the television series Rising Damp, as spoken by Richard Beckinsale and Leonard Rossiter, and from a government-produced public service announcement on mad cow disease.
- "The Big Issue" contains sampled elements from the composition "Danke Für Diesen Guten Morgen", as written and performed by Martin Gotthard Schneider.
- "The Good Ship Lifestyle" contains a sampled excerpt from the BBC Radio 4 Shipping Forecast.
- "Mary, Mary" contains a sampled excerpt from the 1993 film Raining Stones.
- Material at the end of "Outsider", "Creepy Crawling", and "Scapegoat" is bleeped in the US release.
- "Creepy Crawling" contains a sample of "Orbit Aurora'' by Tom Dissevelt, from the album "Song of the Second Moon" released 1957.
- The piano end of "One by One" fades out in the US release as opposed to cutting abruptly to the interstitial material.
- An apparent discrepancy in times for track 6 and 7 on the US CD is due to the coding of track 7 to start at the interstitial material rather than afterward. The US CD seems to have tracks of lengths 4:45 and 5:08, though the printed labelling lists the intended times.

== Personnel ==
Credits are adapted from the album's liner notes.

Chumbawamba

- Lou Watts – vocals, keyboards
- Danbert Nobacon – vocals
- Paul Greco – bass
- Boff Whalley – guitar, vocals
- Jude Abbott – trumpet, vocals
- Alice Nutter – vocals
- Dunstan Bruce – vocals, percussion
- Harry Hamer – drums, programming

with:

- Neil Ferguson – keyboards, guitars

Additional musicians

- Chopper – cello on "I Want More"
- Michael Cohen – vocal on "Amnesia"
- Abbott Sauce Works Band – brass on "Scapegoat"
- Geoff Clout – vocals
- Kye Coles – vocals on "Thank You"

Artwork

- Baader-Meinhof – sleeve design
- Industrial Strength Design – art direction
- Casey Orr – photography

Technical

- Recorded and mixed at Woodlands Studio, Castleford
- Produced and engineered by Chumbawamba and Neil Ferguson

== Charts ==
=== Weekly charts ===
Weekly chart performance
Chart (1997)	Peak position
Australian Albums (ARIA)	78
Canadian Albums (Billboard)	2
Dutch Albums (Album Top 100)	76
German Albums (Offizielle Top 100)	18
Hungarian Albums (MAHASZ)	23
New Zealand Albums (RMNZ)	26
Norwegian Albums (VG-lista)	13
Scottish Albums (Official Charts)	38
Swiss Albums (Schweizer Hitparade)	32
UK Albums (Official Charts)	19
US Billboard 200	3

=== Year-end charts ===
Year-end chart performance
Chart (1997)	Position
US Billboard 200	150
Chart (1998)	Position
Canada Top Albums/CDs (RPM)	65
US Billboard 200	17

== Certifications ==
Region	Certification	Certified units/sales
United States (RIAA)	3× Platinum	3,000,000^{^}
Canada (Music Canada)	4× Platinum	400,000^{^}
United Kingdom (BPI)	Silver	60,000^{^}
^{^} Shipments figures based on certification alone.
