= Timebomb (Chumbawamba song) =

Single by Chumbawamba

from the album Anarchy
- Released: 22 November 1993
- Label: One Little Indian

Chumbawamba singles chronology
"Enough Is Enough" (1993)	"Timebomb" (1993)	"Homophobia" (1994)

"Timebomb" is a single from Chumbawamba's album Anarchy. It reached #59 on UK Charts in 1993. The album version of "Timebomb" combined elements of both the main single version and the "Techno Timebomb" remix, which was included as a B-side on this single.

The chorus of the song is derived from Stephen Stills' Buffalo Springfield song "For What It's Worth" .

The single also includes a cover of Leon Rosselson's 1975 song "The World Turned Upside Down", which was originally made popular by fellow English singer/songwriter Billy Bragg. The song is about the 17th-century Digger movement's struggles against their landowners, and shares a lot of lyrical themes with the 1649 Gerrard Winstanley composition "Diggers' Song", which was also recorded by Chumbawamba on their English Rebel Songs 1381-1914 album, which also features another song called "The World Turned Upside Down".

== Commercial performance ==
The song was commercially successful in the UK, giving the group their second entry on the UK Singles chart. The single spent one week on the chart, peaking at number 59.

== Track listing ==
1. Timebomb (4:09)
2. Techno Timebomb (4:22)
3. The World Turned Upside Down (2:15) (written by Leon Rosselson)
