= Readymades (album) =

Studio album by Chumbawamba
- Released: 18 June 2002
- Recorded: 2001–2002
- Genres: Dance-pop, folk
- Length: 48:33
- Labels: MUTT (UK); Universal/Republic (US)

Chumbawamba chronology
WYSIWYG (2000)	Readymades (2002)	English Rebel Songs 1381–1984 (2003)

Professional ratings
Review scores
Source	Rating
Allmusic	3/5 stars
No Ripcord	0/10
Robert Christgau	(1-star Honorable Mention)
The Rolling Stone Album Guide	1.5/5 stars

Readymades is the tenth studio album by Chumbawamba. It also features vocal samples from contemporary and traditional folk artists, some of whom Chumbawamba would go on to work with in the future. The album's title refers to the use of everyday objects as art by Marcel Duchamp.

The album's artwork pays a homage to the I Have Nothing to Say And I'm Saying It poster designed by Alan Fletcher, which was in turn a self-portrait of German Dadaist John Heartfield (born Helmut Herzfelde).

== Critical reception ==
The album was met with mixed reviews from critics. Writing for AllMusic, critic Michael Gallucci awarded the album three stars out of five; Gallucci praised the album's consistency and noted that it "basically follows the pattern laid out on their previous two albums," adding that "the pop is a little more forward, as is the political theorizing." Music critic Robert Christgau dismissed the album as containing "faux-slick truths about real world horror", singling out "All in Vain" and "Don't Pass Go" as highlights. The album holds a rating of one and a half stars in the Rolling Stone Album Guide, which called the album "skippable" and commented that it was "a vacant, hookless dud: folk song samples and bland singing pasted onto prefab dance grooves."

== Release ==
The album was released on 18 June 2002. A special version of the album, Readymades And Then Some was released in 2003. It came with bonus track–peace anthem "Jacob's Ladder (Not in My Name)" and a bonus DVD.

== Track listing ==
All tracks written, arranged and produced by Chumbawamba, except where noted.

#	Song name	Length	Samples	Notes
1	"Salt Fare, North Sea"	4:28	Lal Waterson & Olly Knight ("Salt fare, north sea"), from their song "Some Old Salty"	Released as a promotional single
2	"Jacob's Ladder"	2:52	Harry Cox's vocals from the song "The Pretty Ploughboy" the album A Century of Song ("And they sent him down into the war to be slain, be slain... / And they sent him down into the war to be slain."); Guitar from Davey Graham's song "Anji"	"(Not in My Name)" version released as single; Written by Chumbawamba & Davey Graham
3	"All in Vain"	4:15	Janet Russell ("I wish, I wish, but it's all in vain...")	The sample sounds very close to the start of the second verse of Jacqui McShee's rendition of "A Bold Young Farmer" (a.k.a. A Brisk Young Sailor Courted Me) on The John Renbourn Group's 1980 album, "The Enchanted Garden".
4	"Home With Me"	3:56		Originally contained a sample from "Say Yes" by Elliott Smith ("I'm in love with the world...") at the beginning of each verse, but the band could not get the sample cleared and changed the line to "your world, my world".
5	"If It Is to Be, It Is Up to Me"	4:42	Coope, Boyes & Simpson, lyrics ("And as we sail, blows wild the gale") from the poem "Bound for Van Diemen's Island" by Jock Purdon	
6	"Don't Try This at Home"	4:02		Was promoted as a single on the exterior of some releases of the album; song was never officially released, though it was later used as the theme song to the film Revengers Tragedy.
7	"Song for Len Shackleton"	3:36	Belle Stewart	See Len Shackleton
8	"Without Reason or Rhyme (The Killing of Harry Stanley)"	3:45	Joe Heany; Janet Russell ("I wish, I wish, but it's all in vain..."); Spoken introduction by Jeremy Hardy	See Harry Stanley
9	"Don't Pass Go"	4:18	Coope, Boyes & Simpson ("Didn't he know it was a waste of time / All stitched up by a thin blue line")	See Satpal Ram
10	"One Way or the Other"	4:02	Dick Gaughan's song "Prisoner 562" (also known simply as "Prisoner"), written by Oswald Andrae ("Peace won't come by words alone")	
11	"When I'm Bad"	4:21	Coope, Boyes & Simpson, lyrics ("They try in vain our minds to chain") from the poem "Bound for Van Diemen's Island" by Jock Purdon	Vocals by Sally Riozzi
12	"Sewing Up Crap"	3:45		Vocals by Michelle Plum & Abi Riozzi
13	"After Shelley"	4:29	Kate Rusby ("Sho lo, lu la lo, sho lo, lu la") The Fight Game, a 1963 radio ballad, opening quote ("Anybody can press a button")	Written by Chumbawamba & Kate Rusby

== Album detail ==
In a statement on their website, Chumbawamba stated that "When we decided to mimic Moby's sampling of traditional black American blues singers on his album Play, we turned to British folk music and its great voices. Kate Rusby, Dick Gaughan, Coope, Boyes & Simpson, Harry Cox. Our album Readymades was put together in a skewed homage to some of those voices. We half expected criticism from the folk world for messing around with the music, but found that the folk audience is assuredly open to change and diversity. Since then – even in the last four or five years – the modern folk voices and players have multiplied and expanded, folkies are looking younger and cooler and there are loads of new folk albums out every month. Good or bad, the music's often inspiring and exciting. That there's still a radical voice in folk music (and especially in its audience) makes it easy for us to write and play the way we're doing right now. Trying to be part of a radical tradition that, for us, encompasses our own histories (mostly northern working towns, The Beatles and punk rock!) and the history of rebel songs in the places we've lived."

== Personnel ==
- Jude Abbott – Trumpet, vocals
- Dunstan Bruce – Vocals, bruitist sound collages
- Lou Watts – Vocals, keyboards
- Boff Whalley – Guitar, merz
- Neil Ferguson – Bass, mouse
- Alice Nutter – Vocals, propaganda
- Harry Hamer – Drums, programming
- Danbert Nobacon – Vocals, ukulele

with

- Simon Pugsley – Trombone
- Toby Greenwood – Saxophone
- Rrose Selavy – Acoustic guitar
- James Reiss – Scratching
- Richard Mutt – Tea-chest bass
- Michelle Plum (credited as Michelle Plumb), Abi Riozzi, Sally Riozzi & Janet Russell – vocals
