= Credit to the Nation =

British hip hop group

- Origin: England
- Genres: Hip hop, conscious hip hop
- Years active: 1992–1998; 2010-present
- Website: www.cttn.co.uk

Credit to the Nation are a British hip hop group, who had chart success in the 1990s and are best known for their Nirvana-sampling single "Call It What You Want". The band is fronted by Matty Hanson (a.k.a. MC Fusion) and was initially noted for fusing a conscious hip hop style with political elements taken from the British left-wing and anarchist movements. Following their initial split in 1998, the band reformed in 2011.

== Career ==
=== Formation and early years ===
Credit to the Nation were formed in the early 1990s by Matthew (Matty) David Hanson (b. Wednesbury, West Midlands, England) with his friends Tyrone and Kelvin while all three were still teenagers. Under the name of MC Fusion, Hanson became the group's frontman and main creative force, while Tyrone and Kelvin took on the role of dancers (and occasional vocalists) under the names of T-Swing and Mista-G. Although they took strong inspiration from American acts such as Public Enemy, Credit to the Nation made no attempt to disguise their origins as second/third generation black Britons from the English Midlands: they rapped and sang in their own native accents (Brummie and West Indian patois), frequently dealt with British lyrical concerns and integrated pop and ragga aspects into their music.

The band had also developed their own brand of conscious hip hop drawing on British life and experience (including, but not restricted to, the black British experience) and espousing a strong opposition to sexism and homophobia. Their political leanings brought them into contact with the veteran British agit-pop band Chumbawamba, with whom they toured on the eight-date "Fuck Me Jesus" tour. Hanson would later cite Chumbawamba's iconoclastic attitude and fervent disrespect for authority as being inspirational for his own band's development and confidence. The two bands would maintain a close relationship, with Credit to the Nation releasing their first single ("Pay the Price") through Chumbawamba's Agit Prop record label in September 1991.

=== 1992–93 – On the rise ("Call It What You Want" and "Enough is Enough") ===
In 1992 Credit to the Nation recorded what would become their best-known song, "Call It What You Want", which sampled the iconic opening guitar riff from Nirvana's "Smells Like Teen Spirit". The band released the single via Rugger Bugger, a London punk label, pressing an initial run of 1000 7" singles. The single came to the attention of BBC Radio 1 DJ John Peel, who played it on his John Peel Session on Radio 1. Within a week, the band had a three-album deal with One Little Indian (the label of Björk and The Shamen) who had heard the show and promptly bought the rights to and re-released the single.

Despite the attention and the added marketing abilities of One Little Indian, "Call It What You Want" eventually charted outside the Top 40 (at number 57). However, the single had brought Credit to the Nation closer to the attention of the British indie-rock music press (Melody Maker and NME), and would also make an appearance on the soundtrack to the Jude Law movie Shopping. While the band's use of a Nirvana sample was widely discussed in the music press, it was less well-publicised that the song also sampled "Welcome to the Terrordrome" by one of the band's more significant influences, Public Enemy.

During 1993, Credit to the Nation spent much of their time touring with Manic Street Preachers, The Levellers, Therapy? and The Disposable Heroes of Hiphoprisy. Most of these were acts with a strong political element and all of them appealed to a white indie-rock/college fanbase. This provided Credit to the Nation with access to a solid commercial audience which was not available to those of their peers who operated only within the British hip hop scene.

The band also maintained their close links with Chumbawamba, with whom they toured extensively and recorded the joint single "Enough Is Enough". Listed at number 1 in John Peel's Festive Fifty list for the year, the song was a strident anti-fascist anthem which received attention for its suggestion of meeting violence with violence: the pay-off line, delivered by Hanson, was "give the fascist man a gunshot." Both bands maintained a strong anti-fascist stance which in turn drew attention and threats from British neo-Nazi groups.

=== 1993–94 – Take Dis ===
In 1993, Credit to the Nation recorded and released their debut album, Take Dis, with various members of Chumbawamba contributing heavily to both production and performance. The album incorporated styles from hardcore approaches reminiscent of Public Enemy and The Bomb Squad to ragga and new jack swing and drew on a selection of unusual (and frequently British-themed) sample sources including Benjamin Britten, Glenn Miller, The Sex Pistols and even the Band of the Coldstream Guards.

The album generated three subsequent singles: "Teenage Sensation" (the band's biggest hit and only Top 40 placing, reaching number 23 on the UK Singles Chart in March 1994), "Sowing the Seeds of Hatred" (UK number 72) and "Hear No Bullshit, See No Bullshit, Say No Bullshit" (which was, in live performance, dedicated mockingly to acts like Kris Kross and East 17). While the band's placings in the mainstream charts remained disappointing, all of these singles reached the number one position in the independent charts in Melody Maker and NME – at the time, an unheard-of achievement for a rap group.

During 1994, Credit to the Nation would also make high-profile British festival appearances at The Glastonbury NME stage, the Reading Festival Melody Maker Stage and the Phoenix Festival (to which they would also return in 1995). While he continued to receive plenty of attention from the indie rock press, Hanson was less fortunate in achieving a mainstream breakthrough in the hip hop world. His trenchant criticisms of the sexism, materialism and fetishisation of violence expressed by hardcore hip hop by acts such as Onyx and Ice-T led to backlash and rejection and his own youth and talent level were subject to attack. Even the indie-rock press sometimes questioned Hanson's position. One memorable critical assault from reviewer Neil Kulkarni (in the usually supportive Melody Maker) directly accused him of selling out to the expectations and tastes of white audiences.

=== 1995–96 – Daddy Always Wanted Me To Grow A Pair of Wings ===
Preparing for a follow-up to Take Dis proved difficult. Hanson's outspokenness (and his continued closeness to Chumbawamba and their own political confrontations) had made him the target of enmity and intimidation in his home region. These eventually forced him to move out of his home following death threats. Hanson found these conflicts (and his own growing celebrity) difficult to deal with. In subsequent interviews, he would confess to having had problems with cannabis addiction during this time, and even to having spent time sectioned in a psychiatric hospital.

Due to these factors, the completion of the band's second album, Daddy Always Wanted Me To Grow A Pair of Wings was delayed by a year. It was preceded by two singles: the self-flagellating "Liar Liar" (which charted at number 60) and a follow-up, "Mad Dog", which failed to chart. As with Take Dis, the album was produced by and featured various Chumbawamba members. Daddy Always Wanted Me to Grow a Pair of Wings was eventually released in 1996. It was received poorly (both critically and commercially), and proved to be an unfortunate turning point in the band's career.

=== 1997–1998 – Commercial decline ("Tacky Love Song" and Keep Your Mouth Shut) ===
The poor performance of Daddy Always Wanted Me to Grow a Pair of Wings led to Credit to the Nation parting company with One Little Indian Records. In 1997, Hanson went on to sign to the German independent Laughing Horse record label (which was affiliated to Chrysalis Records). Credit to the Nation subsequently recorded a third album in Hamburg from which a new single, "Tacky Love Song", was released in 1998. The single attempted to replicate the impact of "Call It What You Want" by once again sampling an iconic current alternative rock act – in this case, Radiohead and their single "High and Dry".

The attempt was partially successful (receiving some positive reviews), but failed to make a significant impression on the charts, peaking at number 60. Having been already delayed by a year, the third Credit to the Nation album – called Keep Your Mouth Shut – was never fully released although a few copies were made available.

=== 1999–2009 – hiatus ===
It was unclear as to precisely when Credit to the Nation formally split up, but recent press releases suggest that a version of the band was still performing live as late as 2002.

Hanson would spend most of the next decade away from music to concentrate on his young family. He would resurface in 2007 as the rapping frontman of a hip-hop/heavy metal band called Backup Radio with guitarist/vocalist Karl Morey, bass player David McMillan, drummer Tom Flinders and DJ Philly Blunt. The band's debut album, 'Blood in the Water', was scheduled for release on Morey's own Crossflow Recordings label in 2008 but was never released. Although Backup Radio no longer continued to write, Hanson maintained his relationship with Crossflow Recordings.

=== 2010–present – reformation ===
In April 2010, Credit to the Nation announced their reformation. The band's first live appearance for eight years was on 15 May 2010 at The Slade Rooms in Wolverhampton, alongside Dreadzone. The band went on to play at the Endorse It in Dorset festival, Shambhala and various festivals around the UK.

The band were completing their as-yet-untitled comeback album, scheduled for release on Crossflow Recordings. Described as "a reinvention of the signature sound" by the band in the press release for the single "RTA", it features collaborations with Chuck D of Public Enemy, Sadat X of Brand Nubian, Benji Webbe of Skindred and label mates Kinkaid and Charly Vox. The album's first single "RTA" (featuring Chuck D) was released on 1 November 2011, followed by "Duppy System" featuring reggae artist Ras Boops on 10 June 2013 and 'Long Time Dead' featuring Benji Webbe on 21 October. As of late 2019, no further recording has been forthcoming.

==== "RTA" ====
"RTA" was the first single from Credit to the Nation's next proposed album. It was released on 1 November 2010 by Digital download. It was remixed to feature American rapper, Chuck D, made available as a b-side remix on the single. On 12 August 2010, they performed the song at Endorse It At Dorset. The song received strong radio support from BBC 6 Music, with playlisting from BBC 6 Music presenters Chris Hawkins, Gideon Coe, Nemone, Don Letts, Lauren Laverne and Steve Lamacq. The song was featured on Steve Lamacq's Roundtable, on 7 October 2010, where it received positive reviews.

Eddy Temple Morris of XFM London, gave the song a positive review on 29 October 2010, stating "I really like that". A review from music news journal Up To Date Music, quoted "A much needed lift for UK hip hop in terms of content, and subject matter."

==== "Mad Dogs and Englishmen" ====
In March of 2023, Credit to the Nation released their first album since their reformation, entitled "Mad Dogs and Englishmen."

== Selected discography ==
=== Singles ===
- "Call It What You Want" (1993) UK number 57
- "Enough Is Enough" (1993) UK number 56
- "Teenage Sensation" (1994) UK number 23
- "Sowing the Seeds of Hatred" (1994) UK number 72
- "Liar Liar" (1995) UK number 60
- "Mad Dog" (1995)
- "Tacky Love Song" (1998) UK number 60
- "Simsalabim" (1999)
- "Ring the Alarm" feat. Chuck D (2010)
- "Duppy System" feat. Ras Boops (2013)
- "Long Time Dead" feat. Benji Webbe (2013)

=== Albums ===
- Take Dis (1994) UK number 20
- Daddy Always Wanted Me to Grow a Pair of Wings (1995)
- 'Keep Your Mouth Shut' (1998) – Unreleased
- 'Mad Dogs and Englishmen (2023)
