= Chester Burn Viaduct =

Railway viaduct in County Durham, England

Chester Burn viaduct
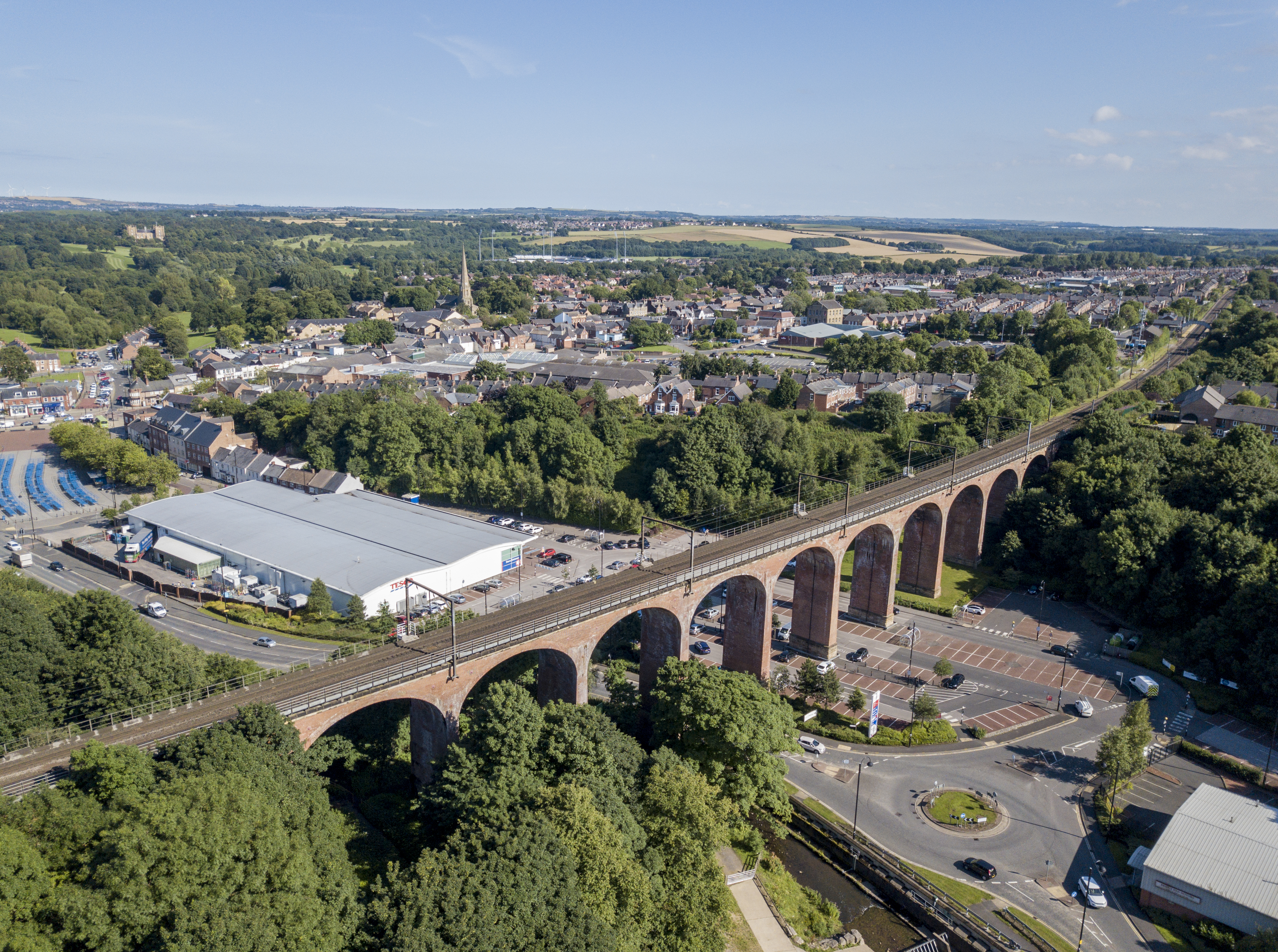
- The viaduct from the north west
- Coordinates: 54.858745°N 1.579095°W
- Carries: Rail traffic
- Heritage status: Grade II listed

Characteristics
- Design: Arch bridge, viaduct
- Total length: 230 metres (750 ft)
- Height: 90 feet (27 m)

History
- Construction start: 1862
- Construction end: 1868

Location
- Interactive map of Chester Burn viaduct

Chester Burn viaduct is a railway viaduct in Chester-le-Street, County Durham, England. It is an imposing structure, dominating the marketplace and north end of the town. It carries the East Coast Main Line, the main railway from Newcastle to London. Chester-le-Street station on that line is just south of the viaduct. It is a Grade II listed structure.

== History ==
A railway line from Gateshead to Durham through Team Valley was proposed in 1846, and authorised in 1848. The downfall of "Railway King" George Hudson in 1849 led to its postponement, and work was delayed until 1862 when the North Eastern Railway regained the authority to build the Team Valley line, which required the building of the viaduct.

The viaduct was completed in 1868 by Benjamin Carr Lawton, under the control of Thomas Elliot Harrison. The line opened the same year, on 2 March for freight and 1 December for passengers. The viaduct is still in use, carrying the East Coast Main Line.

== Architecture ==
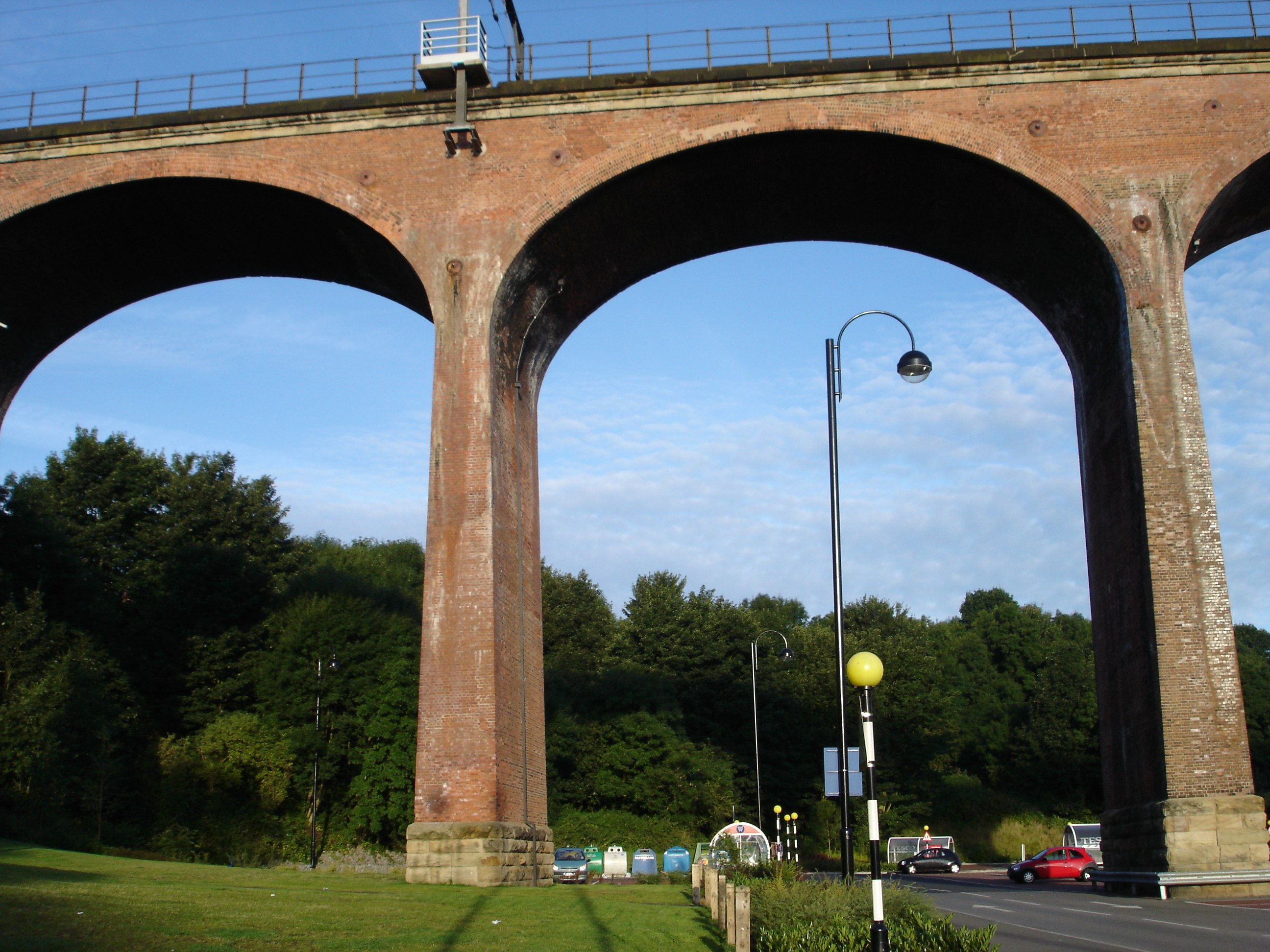
One of the arches

The viaduct consists of 11 semi-elliptical arches, each 60 feet (18 m) wide and is 90 feet (27 m) high, for a total length of 230 metres (750 ft). It is mostly red engineering brick in English bond, with seven rows of header bond around the arches and with stone for the plinths and parapet edge. The stone and bricks are all original, though there has been some resurfacing on the west. Railings and refuges added later are not part of the listed structure. It lies on a north–south axis with a slight curve, passing over Chester Burn.

The viaduct was built to cross Chester Burn (also known as Cong Burn), then a centre of activity with both industrial and residential properties around its banks. In 1955 to establish a new market the area east of the viaduct was cleared and the burn concreted over below the viaduct. More recently a Tesco superstore was built, and its carpark occupies the space beneath the arches today.
