= Waldridge, County Durham =

Village in County Durham, England

Coordinates: 54.8418°N 1.6083°W

Waldridge
- Location within County Durham
- Population: 215 (2001)
- OS grid reference: NZ251497
- Unitary authority: County Durham
- Ceremonial county: County Durham
- Region: North East
- Country: England
- Sovereign state: United Kingdom
- Post town: CHESTER LE STREET
- Postcode district: DH2
- Dialling code: 0191
- Police: Durham
- Fire: County Durham and Darlington
- Ambulance: North East
- UK Parliament: North Durham

Waldridge is a village in County Durham, in England. The population at the 2001 Census was 215. Prior to the 2011 Census the parish boundaries changed and the population shown at this census was 4,215. It is situated to the south west of Chester-le-Street. It is known as either Waldridge Fell or Waldridge Village, the 'Fell' referring to the surrounding area of moorland. The village used to be known as Waldridge Colliery. The current village dates back to the 1890s, the original village having been located on the fell which overlooks the present location. Rainwater runs into the Cong Burn to the north and the South Burn to the south, both of which flow into the River Wear which is a few miles to the east.

== Waldridge Fell ==
Waldridge Fell is a Site of Special Scientific Interest (SSSI), as it is one of the last remaining areas of lowland fell (heathland less than 300m above sea level), in the county, with a raised valley floor peat bog. Wanister Bog is the most significant area of wetland and contains plants such as marsh marigold, bogbean, sedges and bog moss. There is extensive evidence of coal mining with subsidence and other features related to the colliery and pits. Typical heathland vegetation and wildlife are present consisting of heather, bracken, gorse, rabbit, game birds, blackberry, bilberry and raspberry. Waldridge Fell has had many uses over the years;grazing, part of the Prince Bishops' hunting chase and even a military training ground during the Napoleonic Wars. Extensive coal mining took place from the early 1800s until 1963. Waldridge colliery and village community thrived here. The present car parks are named after the rows of houses that once stood here. There are panoramic views across the Fell and surrounding countryside. A number of way-marked routes around the site enable access to different parts of the Fell. Guided walks often take place around this fascinating site. Coppicing of birch trees takes place on a rotational basis to prevent the Fell from returning to woodland, and the rare heathland habitat would be lost. The heather itself is cut on rotation. This encourages new growth and creates stands of different aged heather which benefits a broader range of animals. The Country Park is home to a number of interesting insects and plants, some of which are scarce in this county, such as the green hairstreak butterfly and emperor moth. The very rare red tipped clearwing moth has been recorded here. Pairs of breeding European stonechat may be seen, often perching on a gorse bush.

== Farming ==
Over recent decades Waldridge area farms have engaged in typical farming such as free-range poultry, dairy processing, beekeeping, potatoes and rapeseed. Farmland area continues to reduce as housing expands out from Chester-le-Street, ever closer to Waldridge. The List of farms in Waldridge, County Durham shows farm names, dates and production in more detail.

== Coal mining ==
Waldridge became a coal-mining village. Waldridge Colliery was located on the hill south of Waldridge overlooking the village and the Wear valley. It opened in 1831 and closed in April 1926, having been linked, underground, to a nearby colliery (Chester Moor); the shaft and pithead gear remained until 1967 for ventilation and emergency access. The large slag heap was to the south of the colliery winding gear and buildings. There were other small drift mines on the fell. A waggonway which was in service until 1955 took Waldridge coal to the Tyne via Stella Gill sidings. The most recent mining ended in 1992, when Smithy Dene drift closed; Daisy hill to the southwest of the fell was extensively opencast mined at this time. As the mine was closed & the buildings & winding gear due for demolition, the mine was used as a set for the BBC 2 drama Germinal, shown in 1970. The winding gear was "blown up" during filming. This took two attempts before the winding gear was destroyed.

== Roman times ==
The Waldridge Fell region south of the Cong Burn is suspected to be the location of the Roman road from Chester-le-Street Roman fort to Lanchester Roman fort and the Roman aqueduct to Chester-le-Street.

== Points of interest ==
The main points of interest are the unique (for the county) flora and fauna of the Fell and surrounding area

== Transport ==
The only form of scheduled public transport to/from Waldridge Village/Fell is by bus.

== Tourism ==
The Fell and the Cong Burn woodland are the main tourist attractions.
