= South Burn =

River in County Durham, England

Coordinates: 54.84°N 1.598°W

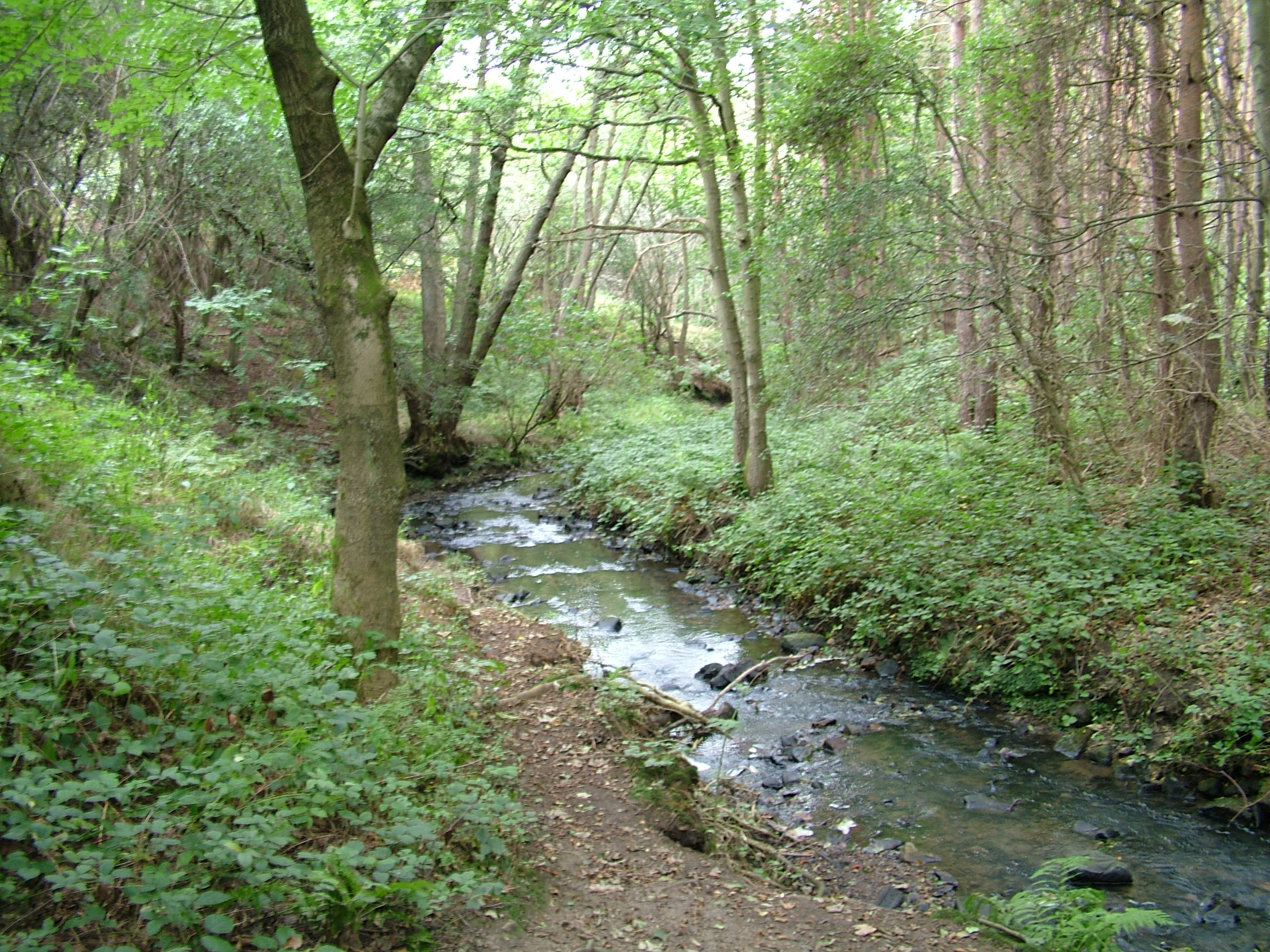
South Burn, Waldridge Fell

The South Burn is a small river in County Durham, England. One branch of the river has its source on Waldridge Fell, the other (and longer) branch, known as Black Burn, rises on the northern slope of Barras Hill, north-east of Sacriston village.

The lower course of the burn occupies an incised valley, Southburn Dene, from which it emerges to cross the floodplain of the River Wear, into which it flows just south of Chester-le-Street.

Part of the river's valley is included in the Waldridge Fell Site of Special Scientific Interest.
