= Waldridge Fell =

Protected area in County Durham, England

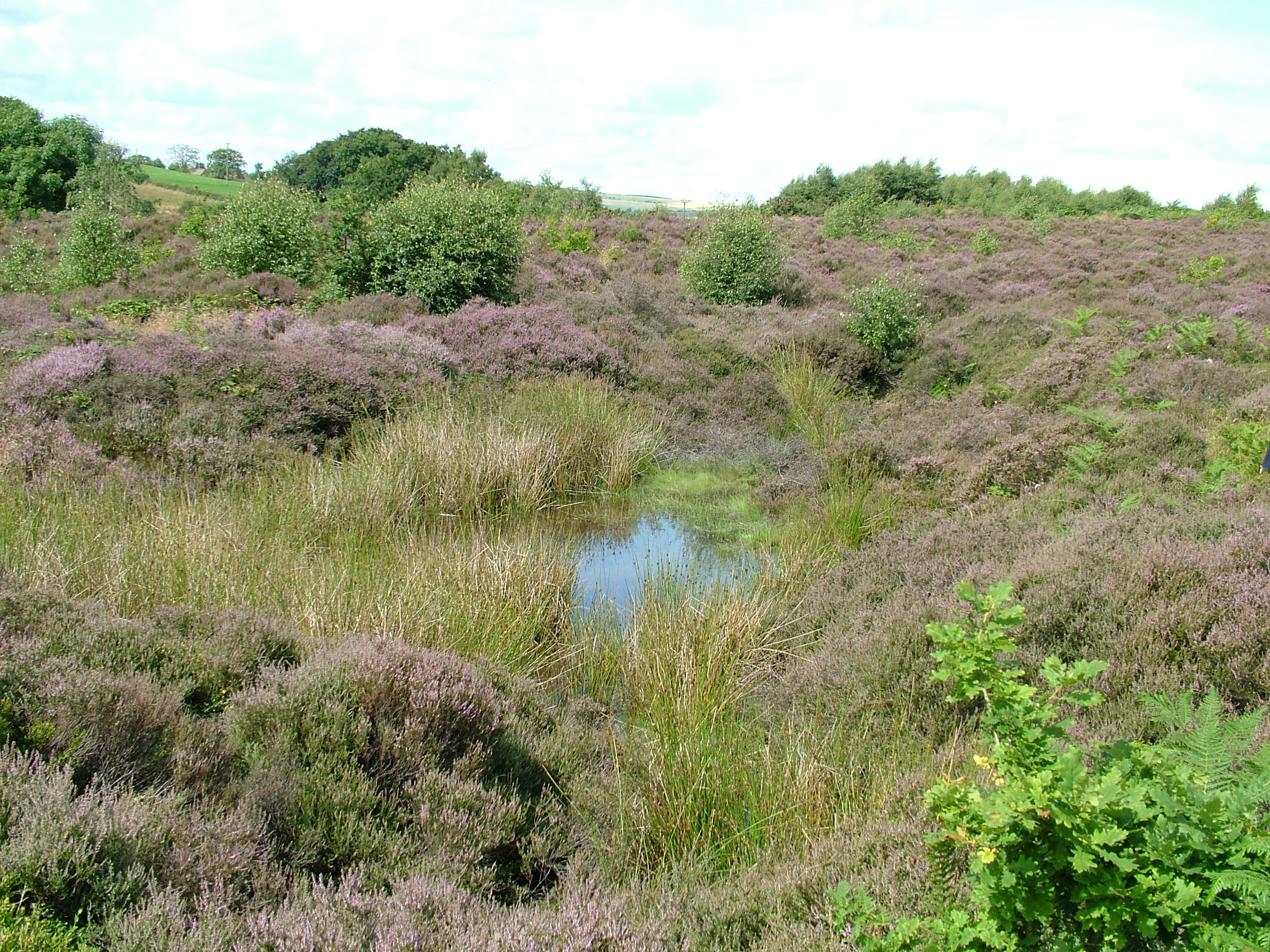
- Calluna vulgaris heathland surrounding a rain-fed pond on Waldridge Fell

- Location within County Durham
- Location: MAGiC MaP
- Nearest town: Chester-le-Street
- Coordinates: 54°50′25″N 1°36′38″W
- Area: 113.5 ha (280 acres)
- Established: 1965 / 1981
- Governing body: Natural England
- Website: Waldridge Fell SSSI

Waldridge Fell is a Site of Special Scientific Interest located immediately south-west of Chester-le-Street in the northern part of County Durham, England. It is one of the largest areas of lowland heath in County Durham and contains the only lowland valley-mire in the county. The fell is home to a number of plants and insects that are scarce to rare elsewhere in the county.

== SSSI status ==
Waldridge Fell was first notified as an SSSI in 1965. The designated area was revised in 1985, the boundary being extended in some places, while portions around Waldridge village were deleted from the SSSI.

The area is important as one of the largest expanses of lowland heath in County Durham, which is close to northern limit for this type of habitat, and is one of the few such areas in North East England. Lowland heath is a threatened habitat in the United Kingdom, which holds around 20 per cent of the world's stock of the habitat: over the last 200 years some 80 percent of the lowland heath in England has been destroyed, and in the UK as a whole only 44 per cent of the area that existed before 1940 still remains.

Also significant is that the Wanister Bog, an area of seasonally-flooded wetland on the south-east side of the fell, is the only valley-mire in lowland County Durham.

The area currently designated as an SSSI occupies 113.5 ha, of which 98.5 ha is classed as dwarf shrub heath, 13 ha is broadleaved woodland, and the remainder is marsh.

The SSSI shares a common boundary on the south-west side with Daisy Hill Local Nature Reserve, while the north-east corner abuts the Cong Burn Wood Local Nature Reserve.

== Geography, geology and ecology ==
Waldridge Fell SSSI is a broadly rectangular area, lying between the valleys of two tributaries of the River Wear, the Cong Burn to the north-west and the South Burn to the south-east. Most of the area lies between 80 and 120 metres above sea level, with a high point of 129 metres.

The area is underlain by Carboniferous coal measures, which are capped by glacial deposits of varying thickness. Spring-lines are prominent on the lower valley slopes and have a significant effect on the vegetation. The soils are predominantly gley and acidic, well-drained and covered with a thin peaty layer on the higher ground, wetter and with a deeper layer of peat in less well-drained areas.

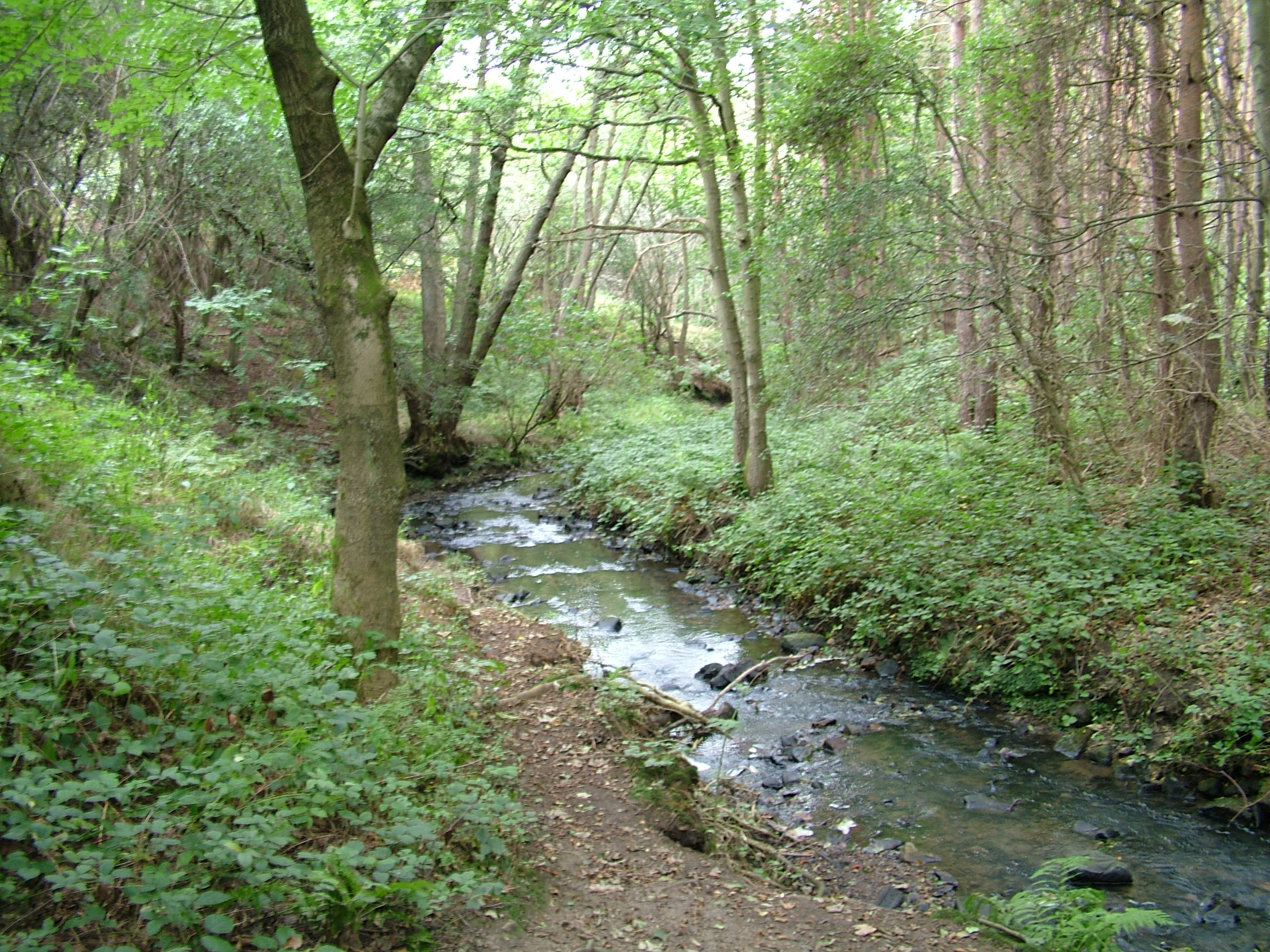
South Burn, Waldridge Fell

Over most of the area, the habitat is heathland, in which the dominant species is ling, Calluna vulgaris, except on shallower soils, where bilberry, Vaccinium myrtillus, and, to a lesser extent, crowberry, Empetrum nigrum, are dominant. The habitat in the valleys of the Cong Burn, and its tributary Little Burn, and the South Burn, is broadleaved woodland. The principal species are sessile oak, Quercus petraea, birch, Betula pubescens and hazel, Corylus avellana, with alder, Alnus glutinosa, locally dominant along the watercourses and at spring-lines. The understorey includes species such as wavy hair-grass, Deschampsia flexuosa, common bracken, Pteridium aquilinum, broad buckler fern, Dryopteris dilatata, and rowan, Sorbus aucuparia.

Wanister Bog occupies a depression in which rainwater from higher up the fell has accumulated and created fen conditions. The characteristic species are Sphagnum mosses, which have also contributed largely to the thick layer of peat that now underlies the bog. Other species that are locally dominant are rushes, Juncus spp., and sedges, Carex spp.

== Fauna and flora ==
The varied habitats within the SSSI support a number of plant and insect species that are rare or local in North East England.

One of the rarest is the red-tipped clearwing, Synanthedon formicaeformis, which was recorded three times in July 2006; this inconspicuous and elusive moth had only been recorded 12 times before in County Durham, the last occasion being in 1948, also in the Waldridge Fell area.

Other notable insects include two other moths, northern drab, Orthosia opima, and dingy shell, Euchoeca nebulata, and a butterfly, the green hairstreak, Callophrys rubi. Another butterfly, the small pearl-bordered fritillary, Boloria selene, used to be common at Waldridge Fell but within County Durham is now confined to only four locations, all on heathland at around 300 metres above sea level.

The most notable plant species are found in the alder woodland along the spring-lines on the lower valley slopes. They include royal fern, Osmunda regalis, and narrow buckler fern, Dryopteris carthusiana, hemlock water dropwort, Oenanthe crocata, and smooth-stalked sedge, Carex laevigata, all of which are rare or have a localised distribution in North East England.

Rare plants that occur in Wanister Bog include devil's-bit scabious, Succisa pratensis, and marsh violet, Viola palustris. The former is the food plant of the marsh fritillary, Euphydryas aurinia, and the narrow-bordered bee hawk-moth, Hemaris tityus, while the latter is the food plant of the pearl-bordered fritillary, Boloria euphrosyne, and the small pearl-bordered fritillary.

The fell is believed to support a significant population of the slowworm, Anguis fragilis, a protected species in the UK.

== Other uses ==
Waldridge Fell SSSI is broadly coterminous with Waldridge Fell Country Park, which is a popular recreational facility for walkers, dog owners and country lovers. The road between Chester-le-Street and Edmondsley cuts across the northern part of the fell and there are several car parks, from which footpaths radiate over the area, including one all-weather footpath for the disabled.

Coal mining took place on and around Waldridge Fell until late in the 20th century—the last mine in the area, Smithydene drift mine—did not close until 1992. Evidence of coal mining activities is still visible in the form of waste tips, subsidence, and the remains of the old waggonway along which the coal was transported.

== Conservation issues ==
The fell is actively managed by Durham County Council, in an effort to maintain a broad range of heathland species, including such desirable species as heath bedstraw, Galium saxatile, and common tormentil, Potentilla erecta. Bracken is particularly troublesome because it crowds out the heather and associated species. The County Council has used a combination of burning and selective herbicides to control the bracken, and in 2007 embarked on a three-year trial of a more environmentally-friendly method, using heavy horses to pull a roller that crushes the bracken. These measures have not been entirely successful; areas that have been burnt are susceptible to invasion by rosebay willowherb, Epilobium angustifolium, while crushed areas have been colonised by the alien invasive heath star moss, Campylopus introflexus.

The last time Natural England surveyed the condition of Wanister Bog, it was losing water through a breach in the surrounding bund and, despite active management, the wetland was being invaded by Salix scrub and saplings. To remedy this, Durham County Council has gained approval for a 10-year programme which will involve fencing the bog and introducing highland cattle. It is hoped that a combination of grazing and trampling by the cattle will restore the bog to a favourable condition. Grazing is already being used successfully on the adjacent Daisy Hill LNR, but could not be introduced to Wanister Bog any earlier because Waldridge Fell is common land and approval to fence off part of the common could not be sought until other management options had been tried and shown to be ineffective.

== Land ownership ==
All land within Waldridge Fell SSSI is owned by the local authority.
