= Thomas Watson (trade unionist) =

British trade unionist

Thomas Watson (1860 or 1861 – 1921) was a British trade unionist.

Born in Radcliffe, Watson worked for many years as an engineman near Wigan. He became active in his local trade union, and in 1900 he led it into a merger with ten other local unions of enginemen, forming the Lancashire, Cheshire and North Wales Colliery Enginemen's, Boilermen's and Brakesmen's Federation.

Watson served as president of the National Federation of Colliery Enginemen and Boilermen for many years, and also as president of the National Federation of Enginemen, Stokers, and Kindred Trades. In 1907/1908, he also served on the Parliamentary Committee of the Trades Union Congress.

Trade union offices
Preceded by New position	General Secretary of the Lancashire, Cheshire and North Wales Enginemen's, Boilermen's and Brakemen's Federation; 1900–1921	Succeeded by William Forshaw
