= Robert Shirkie =

British trade unionist

Robert Shirkie (1868 – 15 August 1954) was a British trade unionist.

Shirkie was born in Ireland, the son of Robert Shirkie, an ironworker, and Jane Simpson. Shirkie worked as a colliery engineman for twenty years, both in Scotland in the Transvaal Colony. He joined the United Enginekeepers' Mutual Protective Association of Scotland, becoming its chairman, and then during the 1910s was elected as secretary of the National Federation of Colliery Enginemen and Boilermen. He represented this federation at the Trades Union Congress (TUC), and in 1918 was elected to serve on the Parliamentary Committee of the TUC.

The United Enginekeepers became the Scottish Colliery Enginemen, Boilermen and Tradesmen's Association, and Shirkie was additionally elected as its secretary. He attended the Paris Peace Conference, 1919, on the invitation of the British government, and in 1935 was made an Officer of the Order of the British Empire. He retired in about 1942.

He died in Hillhead, Glasgow, aged 86.
