= William Browell Charlton =

British trade union leader

William Browell Charlton (1855 – 30 January 1932) was a British trade union leader.

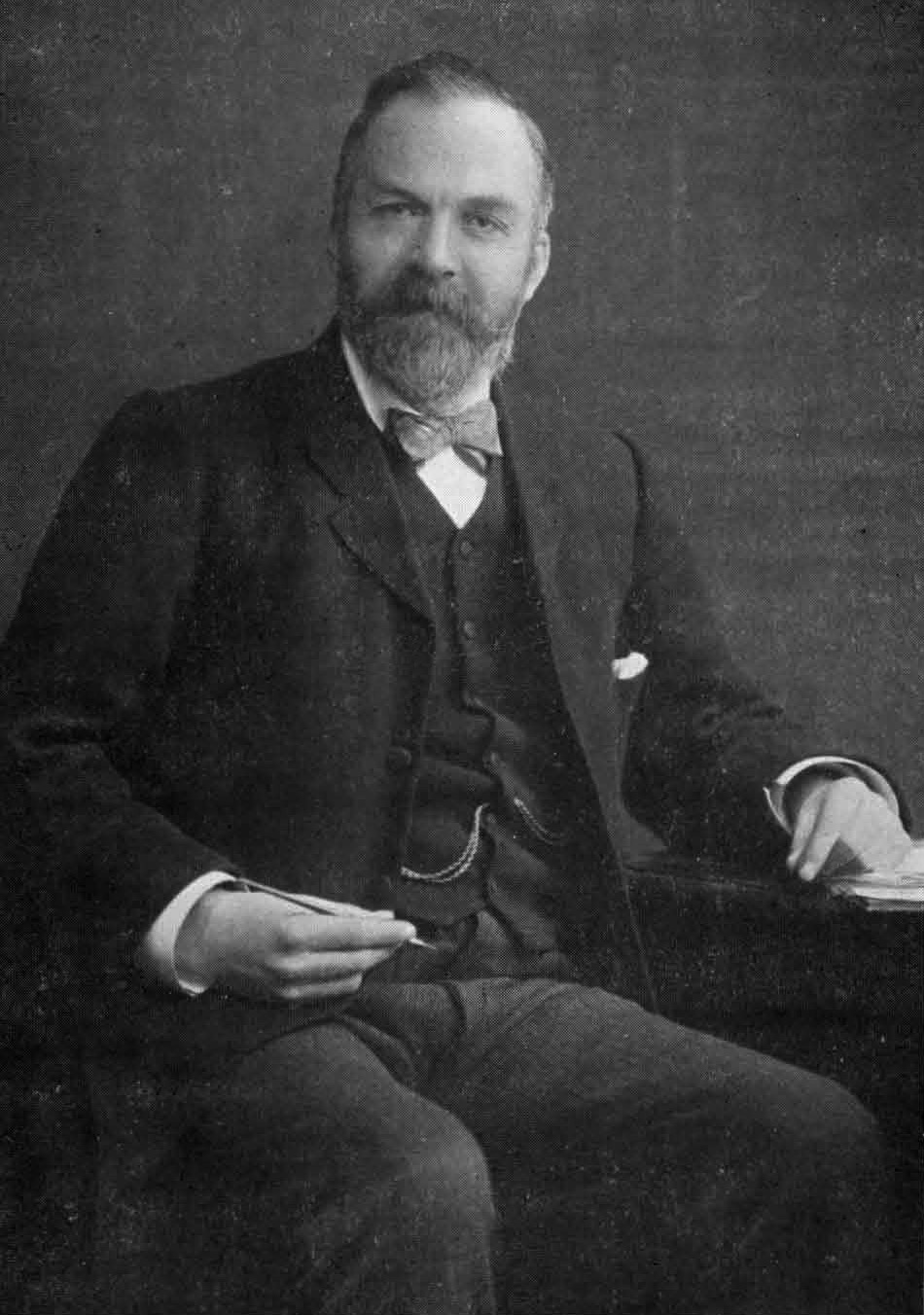
Photo of W.B. Charlton taken in 1907, when giving evidence before Royal Commission.

Charlton was born at Burnt House, just west of Chester-le-Street, in County Durham. He began work coupling at the flats at Edmondsley Colliery when he was eight years old, and then later became a boiler fireman at Littleburn Colliery. He qualified as a winding engineman in 1874, and worked in this role in a variety of mines around the county.

On March 9, 1875, at 20 years of age and with his occupation listed as brakesman, he married (after banns) Mary Green age 19 years, spinster, daughter of John Green, overman at Littleburn Colliery in the parish church at Brancepeth, in County Durham. Both parties residing at Littleburn Colliery.

On November 12, 1882, his wife Mary gave birth to Robert Charlton at 143 Front Street, North Brancepeth Colliery, Brandon, Brandon & Byshottles, UD, their only son to survive until adulthood. W.B. Charlton's occupation at the time is listed as brakesman.

After the marriage, he was employed at Seaham Colliery and later Hetton, when he was elected as the representative of the township on Durham County Council. After periods at Usworth and Hamsteels, he returned to Littleburn in 1894 and took a lively interest in the public affairs of that district. He was the first chairman of Brandon Urban Council, his contemporaries being William Willis, Mr. William Green and Mr. Samuel Galbraith, and was one of the pioneers of the Brandon Co-operative Society. Brandon Urban Council a.k.a Brandon and Byshottle Urban District Council.

Mr. Charlton's connection with the Durham County Colliery Enginemen and Boilerminders' Association began in 1878 when he was elected by the Hamsteels Lodge as delegate to the council of that body. He soon became an ardent trade unionist, and was selected by his fellows for high office, which he carried with dignity and restraint, always exercising an independent judgement on the great issues that cropped up from time to time. In 1889, upon the death of Joseph Routledge, Mr. W. B. Charlton, who had represented the winding enginemen on the executive committee for the twelve months previously, was, at the annual meeting of the delegates, elected president to succeed Mr. Routledge. For four years he was president of the Association, and succeeded in the treasurership Mr. Thomas Hindmarsh when that gentleman was killed at Birtley in July 1893, the result of a fall from the cylinder top while at work. The executive committee resolved that the chairman, W. B. Charlton, act as Treasurer in place of theIr deceased comrade until the end of the year. At the Annual Meeting following, Mr. W. E. Nicholson, of Ferryhill, who had served on the Committee at various periods, was elected president, and Mr. Charlton, Treasurer.

In 1893 Messrs. W. E. Nicholson, W. B. Charlton and W. H. Lambton were appointed as the chief officers representing the enginemen on the County Federation Board.

Mr. Charlton was an earnest Wesleyan Methodist. While in the Crook Circuit he became a local preacher and while living in Durham had occupied many of the pulpits of the Circuit. He was most regular in his attendance at the Old Elvet Church.

He was a Justice of the Peace for the City of Durham. When the court reconvened on the Monday following his death, Councillor T. W. Holiday at the Durham City police court gave the following tribute. "He was one of the most regular members of the Bench. He became a magistrate before I was appointed, but during the whole of the time it has been my privilege to have been associated with this court we could have no more loyal colleague than Mr Charlton, who spared himself in no way in the carrying out of his duties. He was well fitted to occupy the magisterial office and was most conscientious." The court clerk, Mr J.L. Mawson said, "Mr Charlton was one of the oldest and most conscientious members of the City Bench and was a regular attender. He was always scrupulously fair in whatever part he took in making decisions."

Mr. Charlton was fond of the Aged Miners' Homes movement, and attended most of the ceremonies in connection with the foundation stone laying and official opening of these dwellings in various parts of the coalfield. The association had a special claim upon him in the fact that he was one of the founders and in the very early days assisted the late Mr. Joseph Hopper in the multitudinous correspondence.

Having served as treasurer and then president before, in 1905, he was elected as secretary of the union. He was also politically active, winning election to Durham County Council in 1903, and later also becoming the chair of Brandon and Byshottles Urban District Council.

Charlton was keen on the creation of retirement homes for miners, and was involved in the Durham Aged Miners' Homes' Association. He also chaired the Durham County Mining Federation Board, and the National Federation of Colliery Enginemen and Boiler Firemen, spending a short period in the 1890s as general secretary of this organisation.

Trade union offices
| Preceded by William H. Lambton | General Secretary of the Durham County Colliery Enginemen and Boilerminders' Association; 1905–1925 | Succeeded by George Peart |
