= Durham County Colliery Enginemen's Association =

English trade union

The Durham County Colliery Enginemen's Association was a trade union representing engine operators at coal mines in County Durham.

The union was founded on 25 November 1871, at a meeting at the Half Moon Hotel in Durham. Workers at forty different collieries were present, and most had already formed lodges in preparation for the creation of the union. By January 1872, the union had 400 members, and it was able to make an agreement with mine owners, raising wages, while cutting shifts from twelve hours to eight.

The union was central to the formation of the National Federation of Colliery Enginemen and Boiler Firemen, and through this was at times affiliated to the Miners' Federation of Great Britain. It also worked with the Durham Miners' Association, Durham Colliery Mechanics' Association and the Durham Cokemen's Association in the Durham County Mining Federation Board.

By 1907, membership had reached 2,666. In 1944, when it was known as the Durham County Colliery Enginemen, Boilerminders' and Firemen's Association, it became part of Group No.1 of the National Union of Mineworkers.

== General Secretaries ==
1871: John Ambler
c.1880: William H. Lambton
1905: William Browell Charlton
1925: George Peart
