= William Forshaw (trade unionist) =

British trade unionist and politician

William Forshaw (1872 – 22 April 1938) was a British trade unionist and politician who served on the General Council of the Trades Union Congress.

Born in St Helens, then in Lancashire, Forshaw worked underground as a coal miner before working above ground on the mining machinery. He was a founder member of the Labour Representation Committee, and he was elected to St Helens Borough Council in 1905, remaining on it for many years. From 1908 to 1913, he was the political agent for the Labour Party in the Newton constituency.

Forshaw was active in the Lancashire, Cheshire and North Wales Enginemen's, Boilermen's and Brakemen's Federation, and served as its honorary president for some years. In 1913, Forshaw became the full-time assistant secretary of the union, and in 1921 he was elected as its general secretary. As the leading figure in the union, he represented it at the Trades Union Congress (TUC), and from 1933 to 1935 he served on the General Council of the TUC.

In his spare time, Forshaw undertook administration for the St Helens Co-operative Society. He also enjoyed mountain climbing.

Trade union offices
Preceded by Thomas Watson	General Secretary of the Lancashire, Cheshire and North Wales Enginemen's, Boilermen's and Brakemen's Federation; 1921–1938	Succeeded by W. L. Williams
