= Lancashire, Cheshire and North Wales Colliery Enginemen's, Boilermen's and Brakesmen's Federation =

British trade union

Lancashire Enginemen's Association
- Lancashire, Cheshire and North Wales Colliery Enginemen's, Boilermen's and Brakesmen's Federation
- Merged into: North West Area of the National Union of Mineworkers
- Founded: 1900
- Dissolved: 1963
- Headquarters: 50 Queen's Drive, Windle, St Helens
- Location: United Kingdom
- Members: 2,000 (1942)
- Parent organization: National Union of Mineworkers (1945–1963)
- Affiliations: TUC, NFCEB

The Lancashire, Cheshire and North Wales Colliery Enginemen's, Boilermen's and Brakesmen's Federation was a trade union representing engine operators and related workers at coal mines in parts of England and Wales.

The union was founded in 1900 with the merger of eleven local unions of enginemen. This was organised by Thomas Watson, who became the general secretary of the new union. The union affiliated to the National Federation of Colliery Enginemen and Boilermen, and also to the Trades Union Congress (TUC), with Watson serving a term on the Parliamentary Committee of the TUC. Watson died in 1921, and was replaced by William Forshaw, who served a term on the General Council of the TUC.

In 1945, the union became part of Group No.2 of the new National Union of Mineworkers (NUM), and thereafter had much less autonomy. In 1963, the union merged into the North West Area of the NUM, with members based in North Wales instead transferring to the North Wales Area of the NUM. In both areas, former members of the union were placed in their own branch, although over time, some chose instead to join the area's branch for their pit.

== General Secretaries ==
1900: Thomas Watson
1921: William Forshaw
1938: W. L. Williams
