= National Federation of Colliery Enginemen and Boiler Firemen =

The National Federation of Colliery Enginemen and Boiler Firemen was a union federation in the United Kingdom. Its membership changed over time, but was centred on unions representing enginemen at coal mines.

The federation was founded in Manchester in 1873 as the National Federation of Enginemen's Protective Associations of Great Britain. It grew steadily, and by 1894 had seventeen affiliated unions, although their combined membership was less than 10,000.

By 1915, it had refocused on its members in coal mines, and was known as the National Federation of Colliery Enginemen and Boiler Firemen. It affiliated to the Miners' Federation of Great Britain (MFGB) in 1919, but disaffiliated again in 1921, believing that the MFGB's strike that year was not in its members' interests. It began accepting colliery mechanics, and changed its name to the National Federation of Colliery Enginemen, Boilermen and Mechanics.

In 1944, the Durham County Colliery Enginemen, Boilerminders' and Firemen's Association, and Yorkshire Colliery Enginemen and Firemen's Association became part of Group No.1 of the National Union of Mineworkers, while the Lancashire, Cheshire and North Wales Colliery Enginemen's, Boilermen's and Brakesmen's Federation, Derbyshire, Nottinghamshire and Midland Counties Colliery Enginemen, Firemen, Motormen and Electricians' Union, and the Scottish Colliery Enginemen, Boilermen and Tradesmen's Association became part of its Group No.2, and the Cumberland Colliery Enginemen, Boilermen and Electrical Workers along with the colliery membership of the National Union of Enginemen, Firemen, Mechanics and Electrical Workers became part of its Power Group. As a result, the federation appears to have dissolved.

== Secretaries ==
1890s: William Browell Charlton
c.1897: Muir
1910s: C. Hearse
1922: Robert Shirkie
