= Cong Burn =

River in County Durham, England

Coordinates: 54.8582°N 1.5661°W

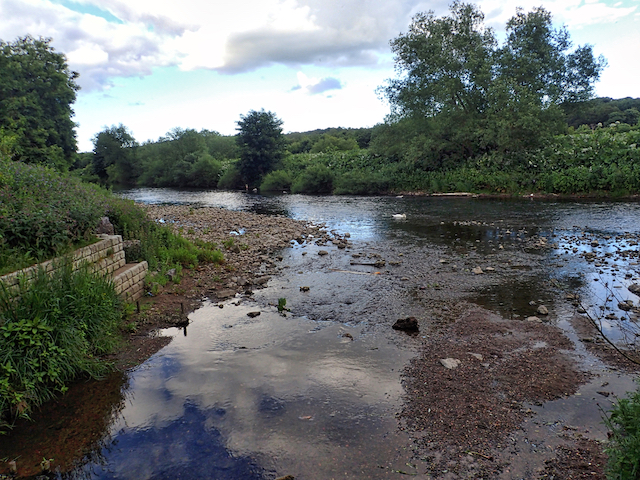
Confluence of the Cong Burn with the River Wear

The Cong Burn, also referred to as the Chester Burn and Wardle's Burn near its source, is a small river in County Durham, England. It has its origin in a number of streams, among them Wheatley Green Burn, that rise on the southern and eastern slopes of Wheatley Hill, north of the village of Burnhope, and other streams, principally Whiteside Burn, that have their source on the southern slopes of Wheatley Hill and the northern slopes of Taylor's Hill, just east of Burnhope.

These streams come together in the vicinity of West Edmondsley to form the Cong Burn, which flows in a broadly easterly or northeasterly direction, around the northern flank of Waldridge Fell and the western edge of Chester-le-Street, before flowing through the town to join the River Wear immediately east of the town.

In 1932, the lower reach of the burn, where it passes through the centre of Chester-le-Street, was channelled into a covered concrete culvert, which passes beneath the town's Market Place.

== Etymology ==
Cong Burn takes its name from the Roman Fort once present at Chester-le-Street, Concangis.
