= Chester-le-Street =

Town in County Durham, England

Coordinates: 54.8594°N 1.5699°W

- Town
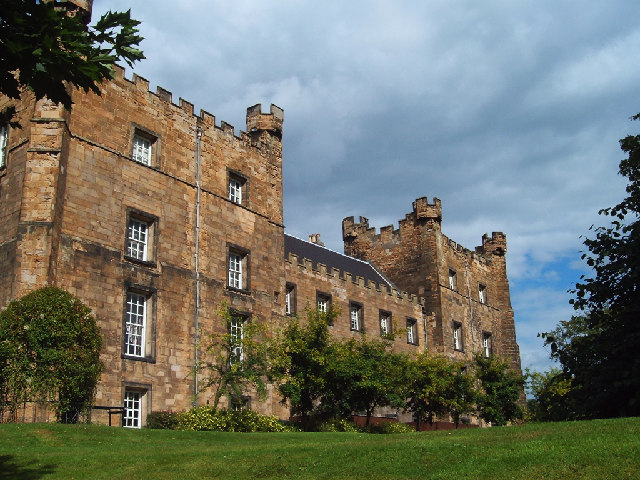
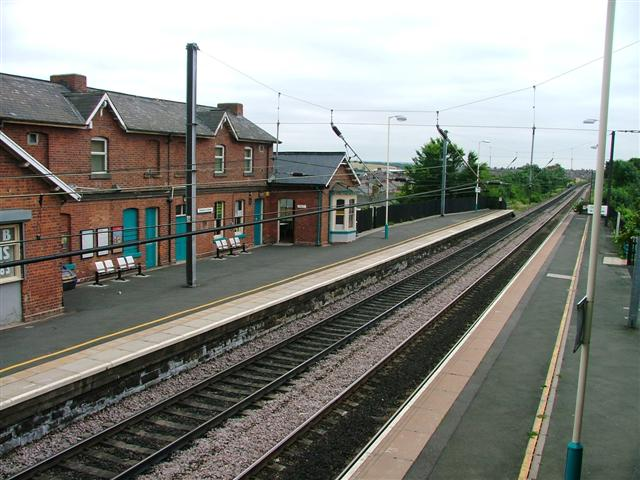
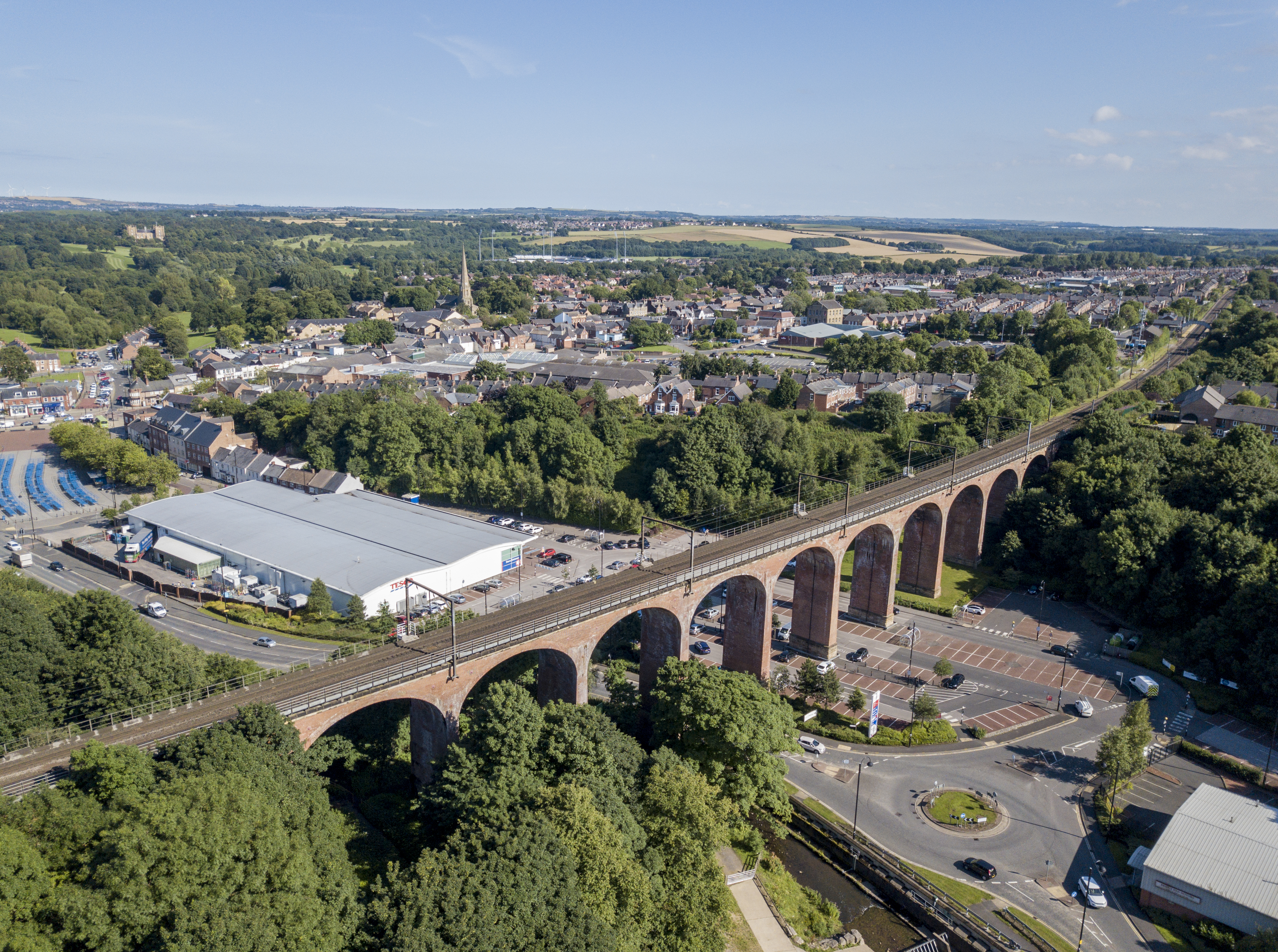
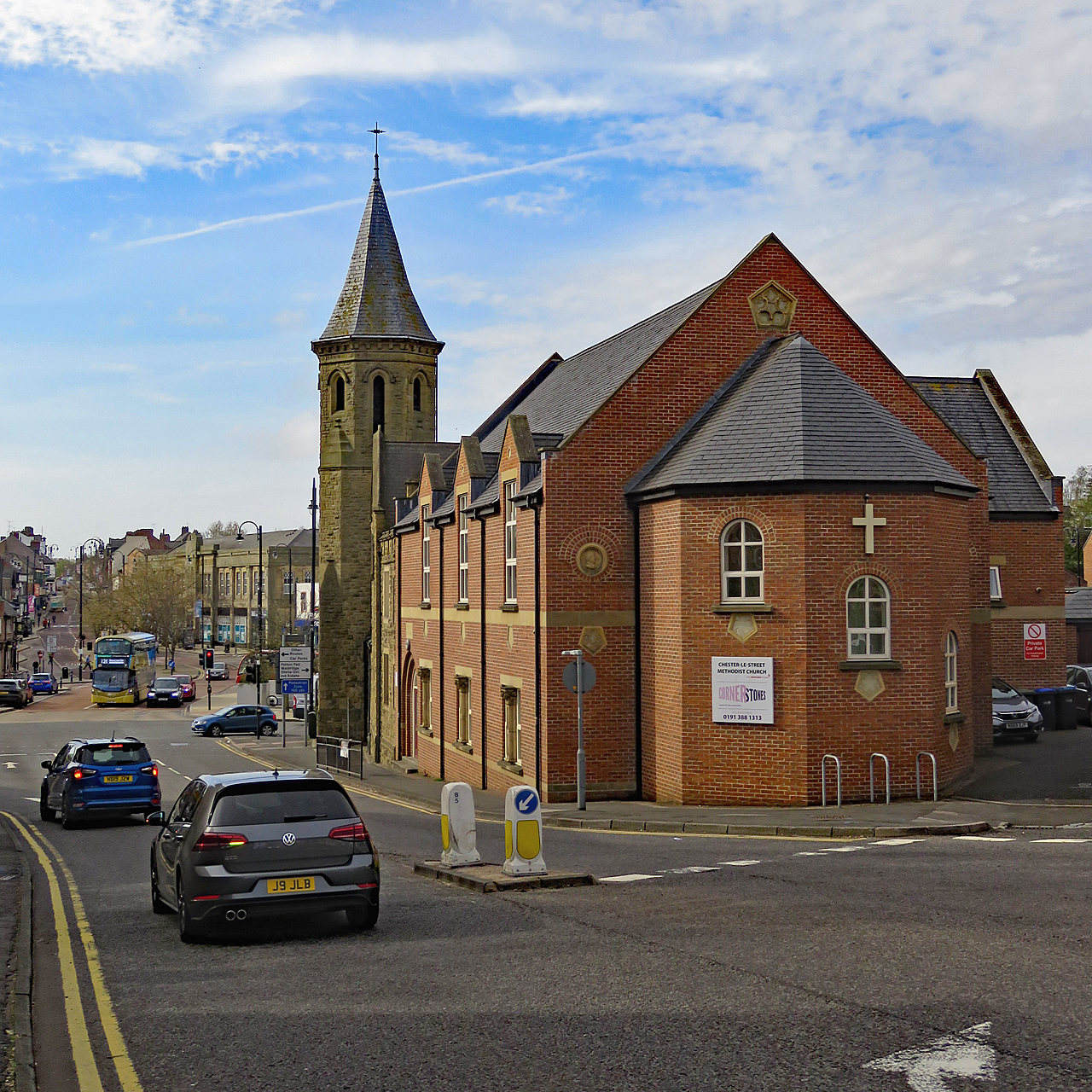
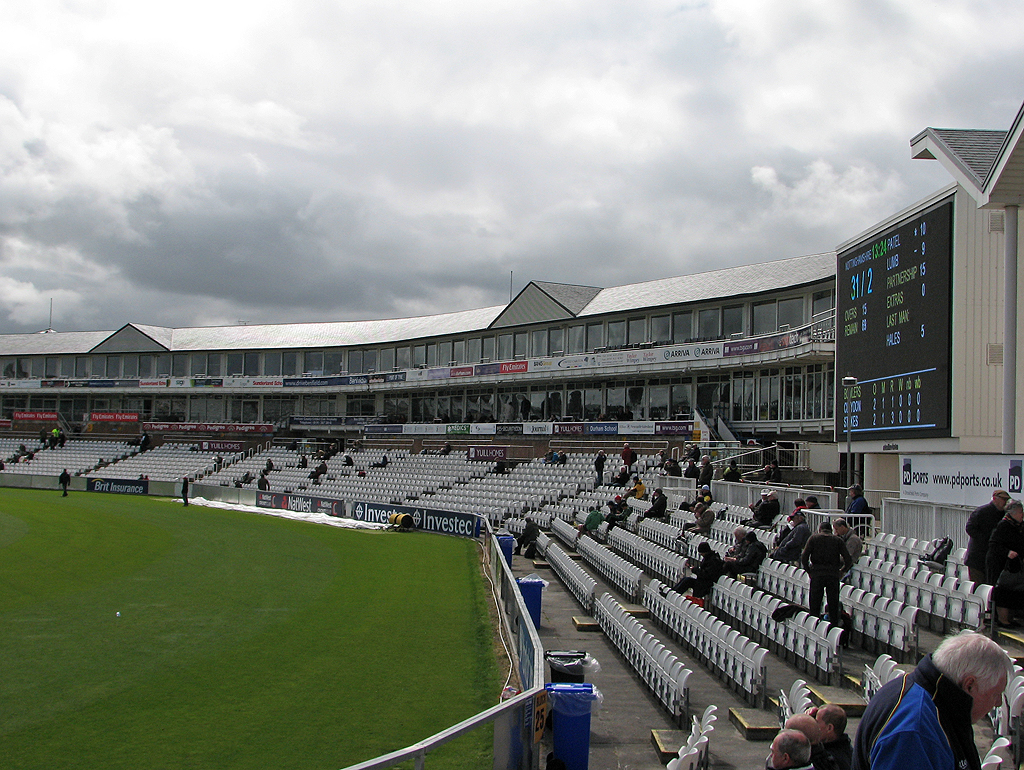
- Lumley Castle The town's railway station Chester Burn Viaduct Methodist Church Riverside Ground

- Location within County Durham
- Population: 23,555 (2021 census)
- OS grid reference: NZ270512
- Unitary authority: County Durham
- Ceremonial county: County Durham
- Region: North East
- Country: England
- Sovereign state: United Kingdom
- Post town: Chester Le Street
- Postcode district: DH2, DH3
- Dialling code: 0191
- Police: Durham
- Fire: County Durham and Darlington
- Ambulance: North East
- UK Parliament: North Durham

Chester-le-Street (/ˈtʃɛstəlistriːt/) is a market town in County Durham, England. It is located around 6 miles (10 km) north of Durham (Note: Measured from Durham Cathedral to St Mary and St Cuthbert's Church, Chester-le-Street) and 9 miles (14 km) south of Newcastle-upon-Tyne. The town holds markets on Saturdays. At the 2021 census, the town had a population of 23,555.

== History ==
=== Toponymy ===
The Romans founded a fort named Concangis or Concagium, which was a Latinisation of the original Celtic name for the area, which also gave name to the waterway through the town, Cong Burn. The precise name is uncertain as it does not appear in Roman records, but Concangis is the name most cited today. Although a meaning 'place of the horse people' has been given, scholarly authorities consider the meaning of the name obscure.

Old English forms of the name include Cuneceastra and Conceastre, which takes its first two syllables from the Roman name, with the addition of the Old English word ceaster 'Roman fortification'. (For example, the old bell in St Mary and St Cuthbert is inscribed in Latin):

Magister Robertus Aschbern, Decanus Cestriae, me fecit. Hac campana data Cuthbertus sic cocitata
Master Robert Ashburn, Dean of the fort, made me. This bell given is thus named Cuthbert

The Universal Etymological English Dictionary of 1749 gives the town as Chester upon Street (and describes it as "a Village in the Bishoprick of Durham"). At some point this was shortened to the modern form.

=== Town biography ===
The town's history is ancient. Records date to a Roman-built fort called Concangis, which is the Chester (from the Latin castra) of the town's name; the Street refers to the paved Roman road that ran north–south through the town. The parish church of St Mary and St Cuthbert is where the body of St Cuthbert remained for 112 years (from 883 to 995 AD), before being transferred to Durham Cathedral.

An Old English translation of the Gospels was made in the 10th century: a word-for-word gloss of the Latin Vulgate text, inserted between the lines by Aldred the Scribe, who was Provost of Chester-le-Street.

There is evidence of Iron Age use of the River Wear near the town, Concangis was built alongside the Roman road Cade's Road (now Front Street) and close to the River Wear, around 100 AD, and was occupied until the Romans left Britain in 410 AD at the time, the Wear was navigable to at least Concangis and may also have provided food for the garrisons stationed there.

In 883, a group of monks, driven out of Lindisfarne seven years earlier, chose a base at Chester-le-Street, having been gifted a church by the Danish king, Guthred. They built a shrine to St Cuthbert, whose body they had borne with them. It became the seat of the Bishop of Lindisfarne, making the church a cathedral. There, the monks translated the Lindisfarne Gospels into English. They stayed for 112 years, leaving in 995 for a safer home in Durham. The title has been revived as the Roman Catholic titular see of Cuncacestre.

The church was rebuilt in stone in 1054 and, despite the loss of its bishopric, seems to have retained a degree of wealth and influence. In 1080, most of the huts in the town were burned and many people killed in retaliation for the death of Walcher, the first prince-bishop, at the hands of an English mob. The town was not recorded in the Domesday Book of 1086.

Cade's Road did not fall out of use but was hidden beneath later roads which became the Great North Road, the main route from London and the south to Newcastle and Edinburgh. The town's location on the road played a significant role in its development, as well as its name, as inns sprang up to cater for the travelling trade. This trade reached a peak in the early 19th century as more people and new mail services were carried by stagecoach, before declining as railways became more popular. The town was bypassed when the A167 road was routed around the town and this was later supplanted by the A1(M) motorway.

From the late 17th century onwards, coal was dug in increasing quantities in the region. At the same time, the growth of the mines and the influx of miners supported local businesses, not just the many inns but new shops and services, themselves bringing in more people to work in them. These people would later work in new industries established in the town to take advantage of its good communications and access to raw materials.

The population at the time of the 1841 census was 2,599 inhabitants.

On the evening of 5 October 1936, the Jarrow Marchers stopped at the town centre after their first day's walk. The church hall was used to house them before they continued onward the following day.

== Governance ==
From 1894 until 2009, local government districts were governed from the town. From 1894 to 1974, it had a rural district, which covered the town and outlying villages. In 1909, the inner rural district formed an urban district, which covered the town as it was at that time.

By 1974, the town expanded out of the urban district, during that year's reforms the urban and rural districts, as well as other areas formed a non-metropolitan district. It was abolished in 2009 reforms when the non-metropolitan county became a unitary authority.

== Climate ==
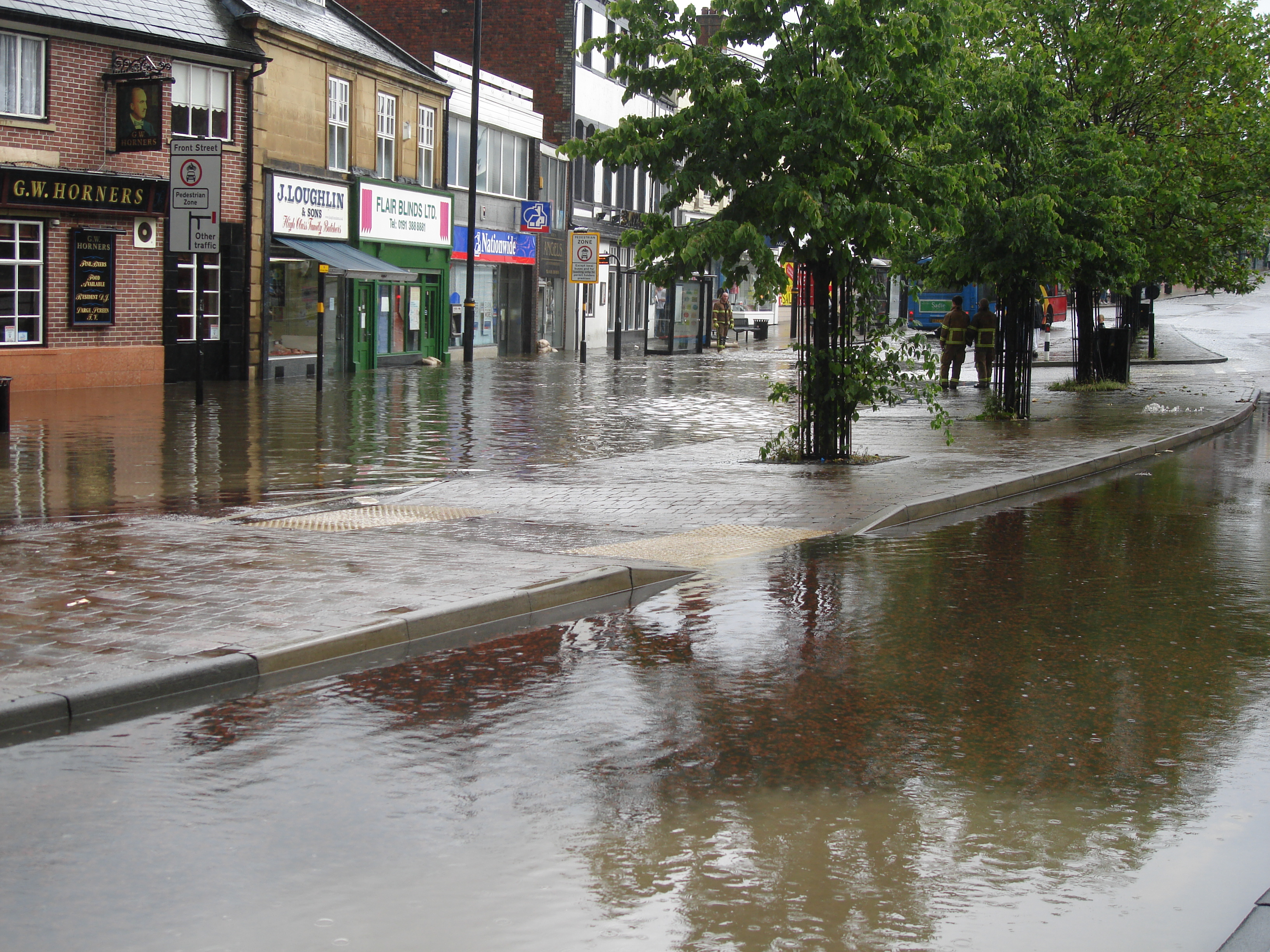
Flooding on Front Street in 2007

The town has a mild climate and gets well below average rainfall relative to the UK; it does though experience occasional floods. To the east of the town lie the Riverside cricket ground and Riverside Park; they were built on the flood plains of the River Wear and are often flooded when the river bursts its banks. The town centre is subject to occasional flash flooding, usually after very heavy rain over the town and surrounding areas, if the rain falls too quickly for it to be drained away by Cong Burn. The flooding occurs at the bottom of Front Street where the Cong Burn passes under the street, after it was enclosed in concrete in 1932.

== Landmarks ==
Chester-le-Street's landmarks
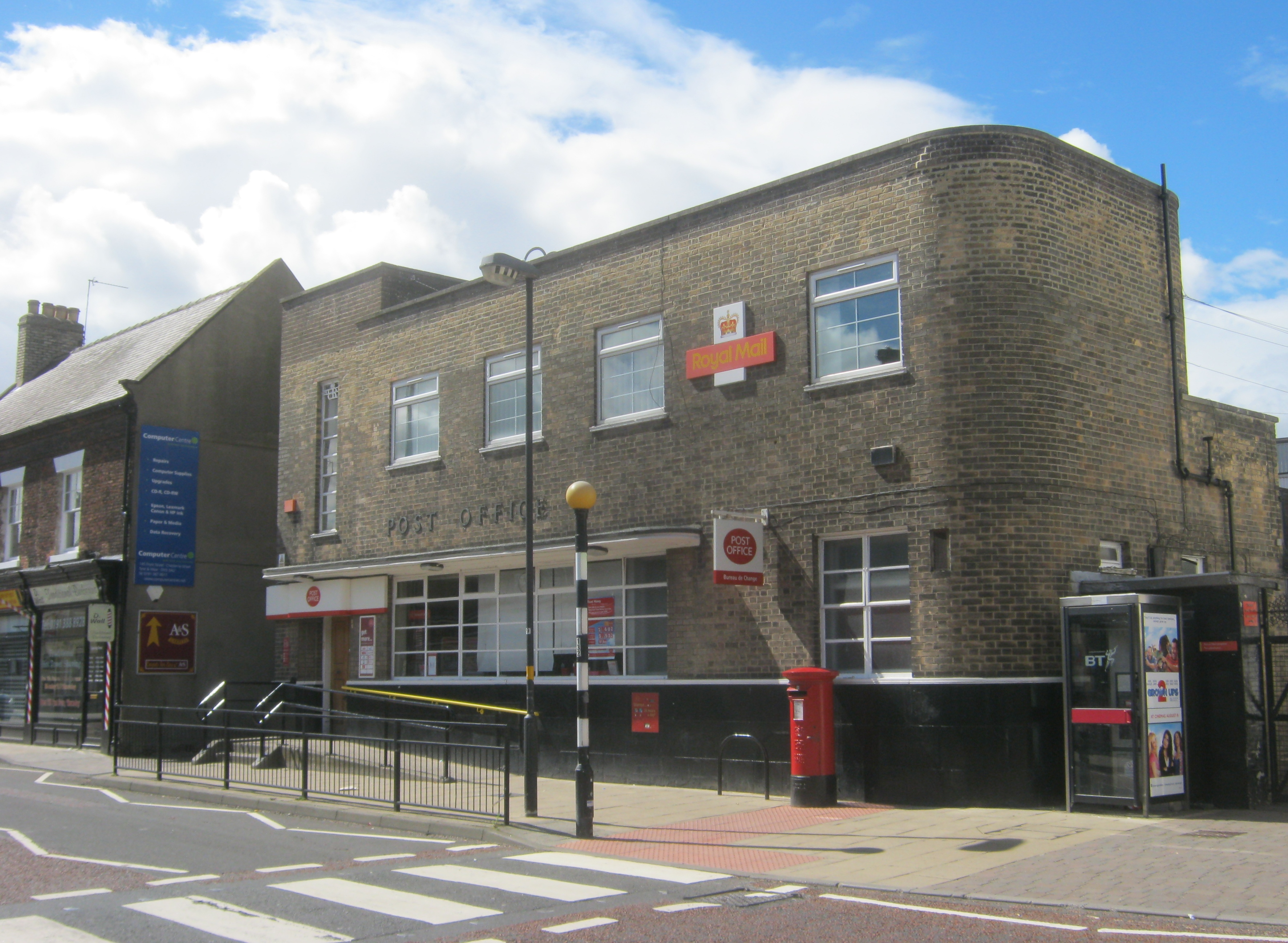
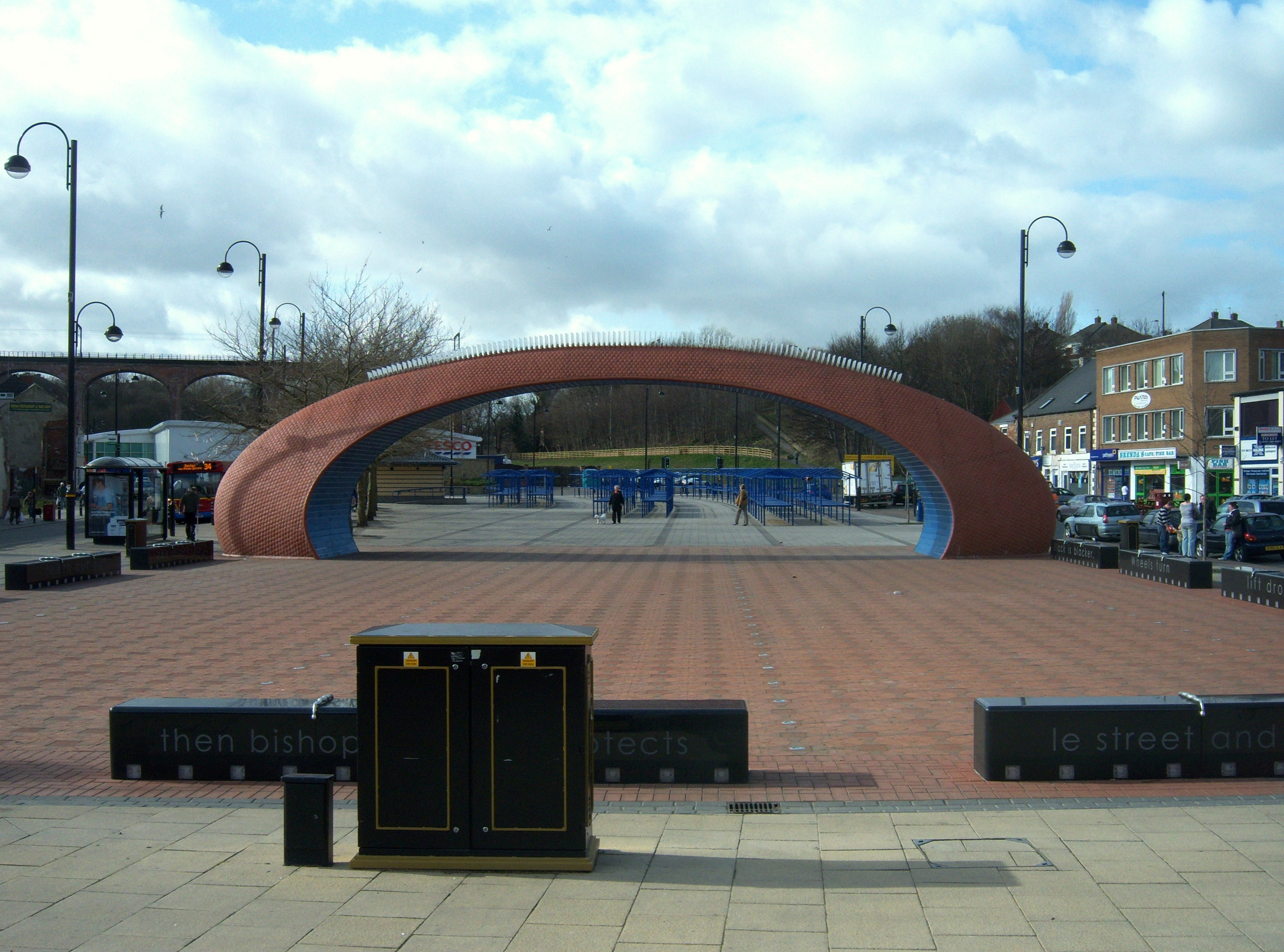
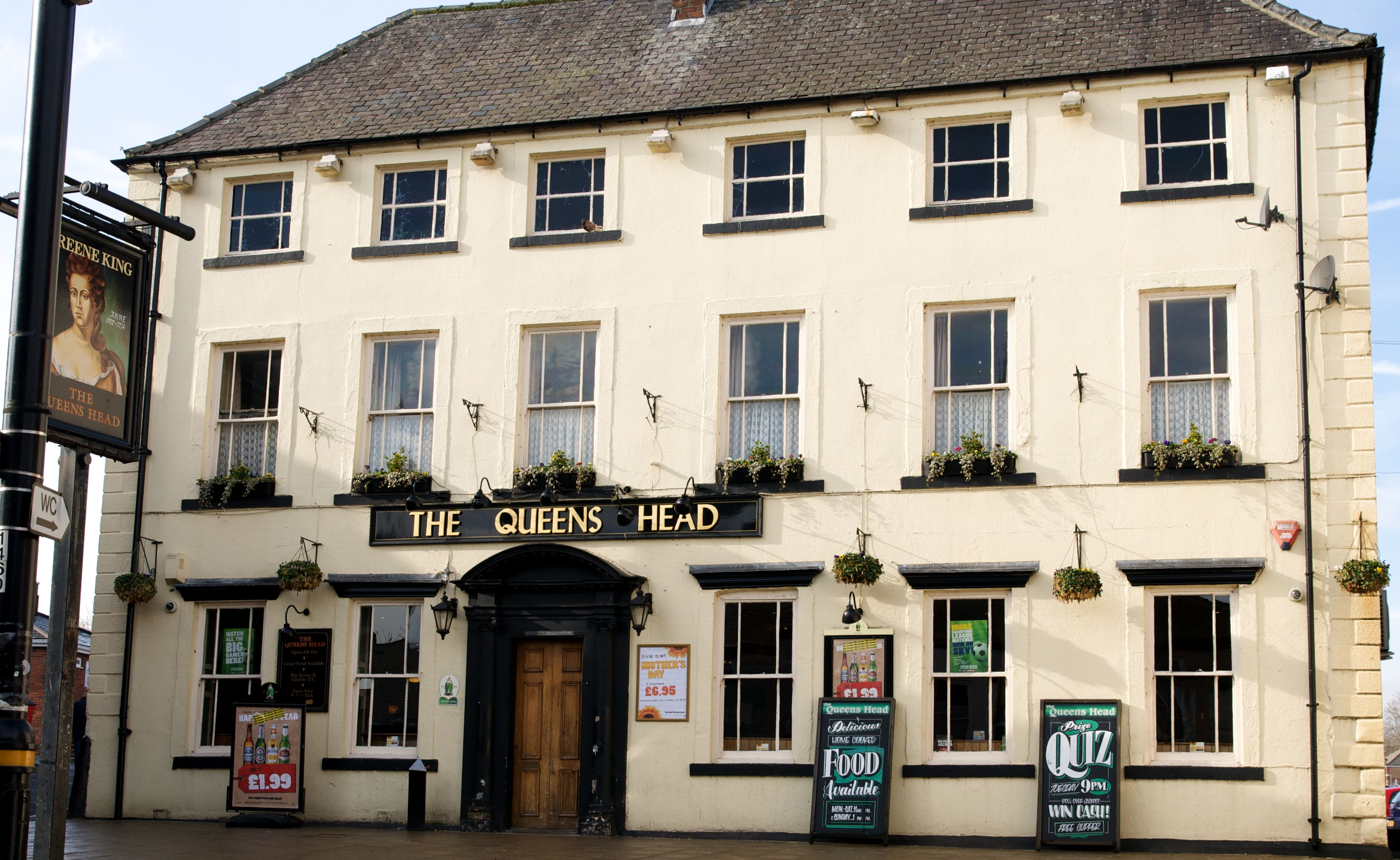
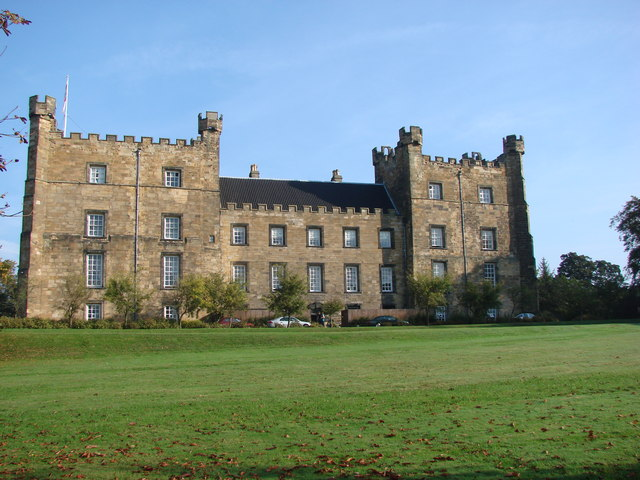
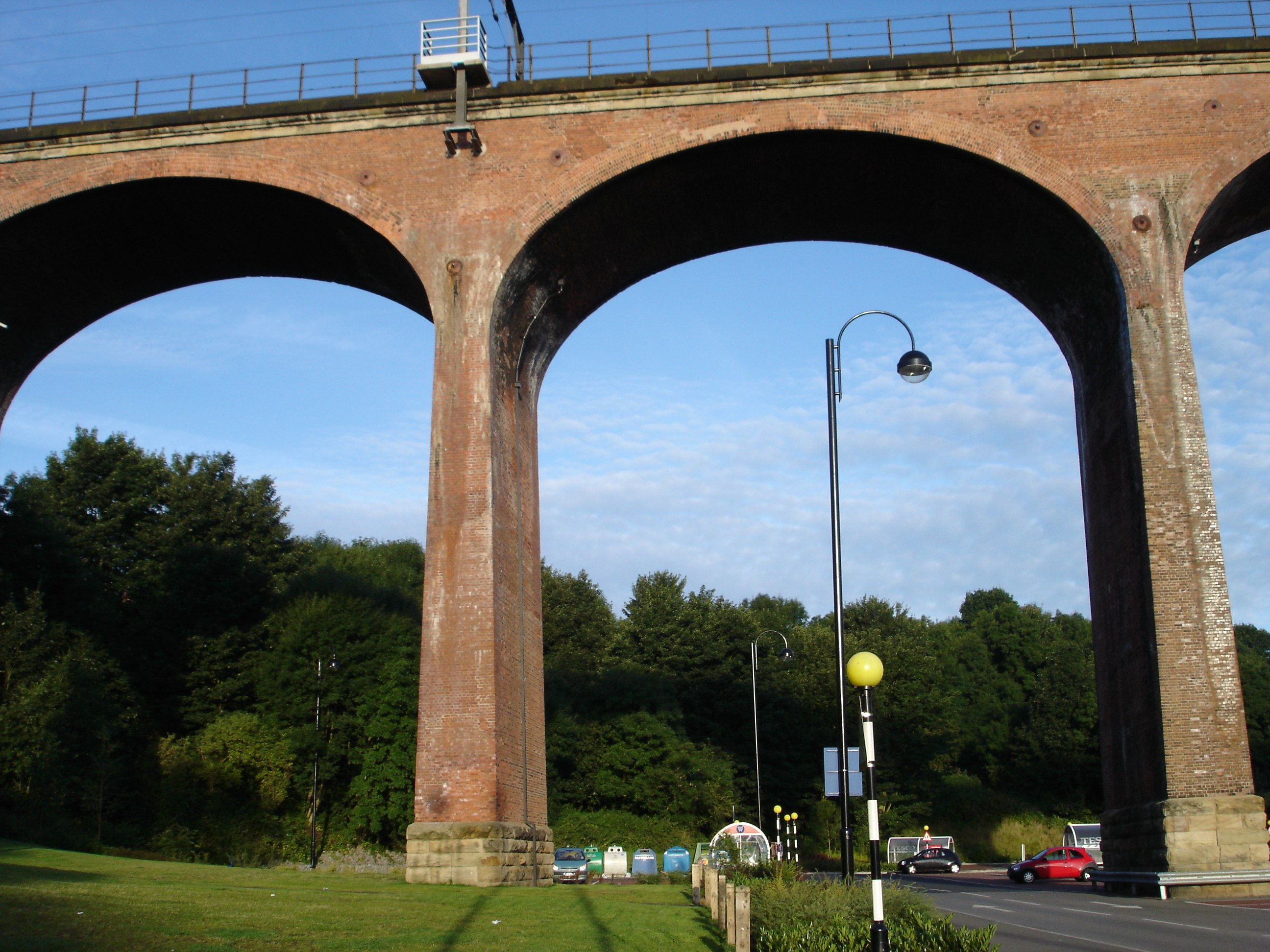
The general Post Office, the marketplace with the former Civic Heart sculpture (now demolished), the Queens Head Hotel on Front Street, Lumley Castle and Chester Burn viaduct

John Leland described Chester-le-Street in the 1530s as "Chiefly one main street of very mean building in height", a sentiment echoed by Daniel Defoe.

=== Chester Burn viaduct ===
The viaduct, which lies to the north-west of the town centre, was completed in 1868 for the North Eastern Railway, to enable trains to travel at high speed on a more direct route between Newcastle and Durham. It is over 230 metres (250 yd) long with 11 arches, now spanning a road and supermarket car park, and is a Grade II listed structure.

=== Lumley Castle ===
Lumley Castle was built in 1389. It is on the eastern bank of the River Wear and overlooks the town and the Riverside Park.

=== The Queens Head Hotel ===
The Queens Head Hotel is located in the central area of the Front Street; it was built over 250 years ago. The road formed part of the main route from Edinburgh and Newcastle to London and the south of England. A Grade II listed building, it is set back from the street and is still one of the largest buildings in the town centre.

=== The Post Office ===
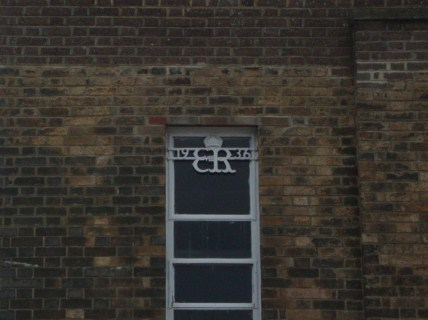
Edward VIII Royal Emblem on the main Post Office

Chester-le-Street post office, on Front Street, is in Art Deco style and replaced a smaller building located on the corner of Relton Terrace and Ivanhoe Terrace. It opened in 1936 and is unusual in that it is one of a handful (Note: The website https://britishpostofficearchitects.weebly.com/ lists Bradford-on-Avon, Builth Wells, Havant, March and Wallingford.) of post offices that display the royal cypher from the brief reign of Edward VIII.

== Religious sites ==
=== St Mary and St Cuthbert Church ===
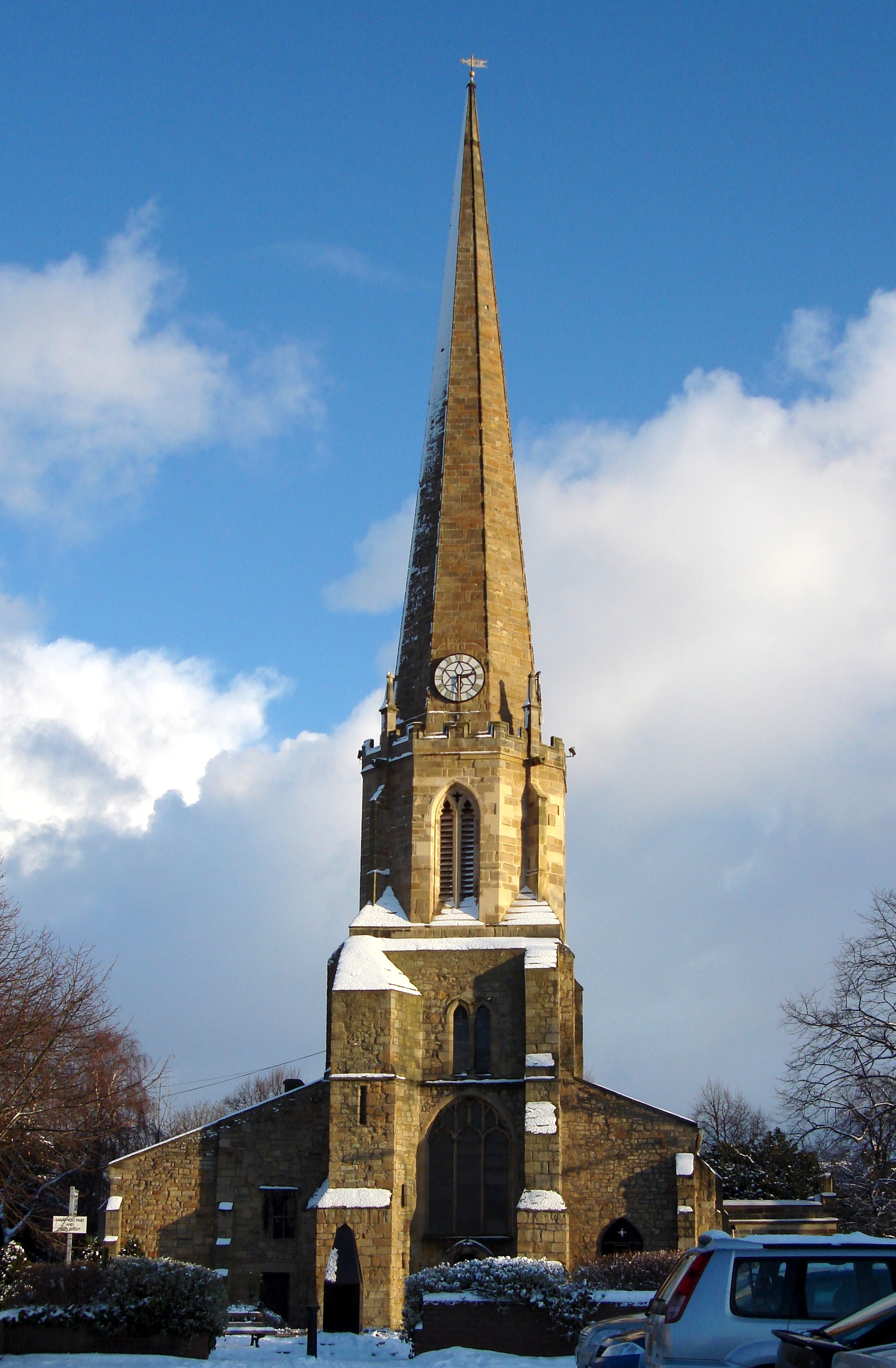
St Mary and St Cuthbert parish church

St Mary and St Cuthbert church possesses a rare surviving 14th century anchorage, one of the best-preserved in the country. It was occupied by six anchorites from 1383 to c. 1538 and its walled-up cell had only a slit from which the anchorite could observe the altar and receive food, while outside was an open grave for when the occupant died. It is now a museum known as the Anker's House. The north aisle is occupied by a line of Lumley family effigies, only five genuine, assembled circa 1590. Some have been chopped off to fit and resemble a casualty station at Agincourt, according to Sir Simon Jenkins in his England's Thousand Best Churches. This and Lumley Castle are Chester-le-Street's only Grade I listed buildings.

=== Bethel United Reformed Church ===
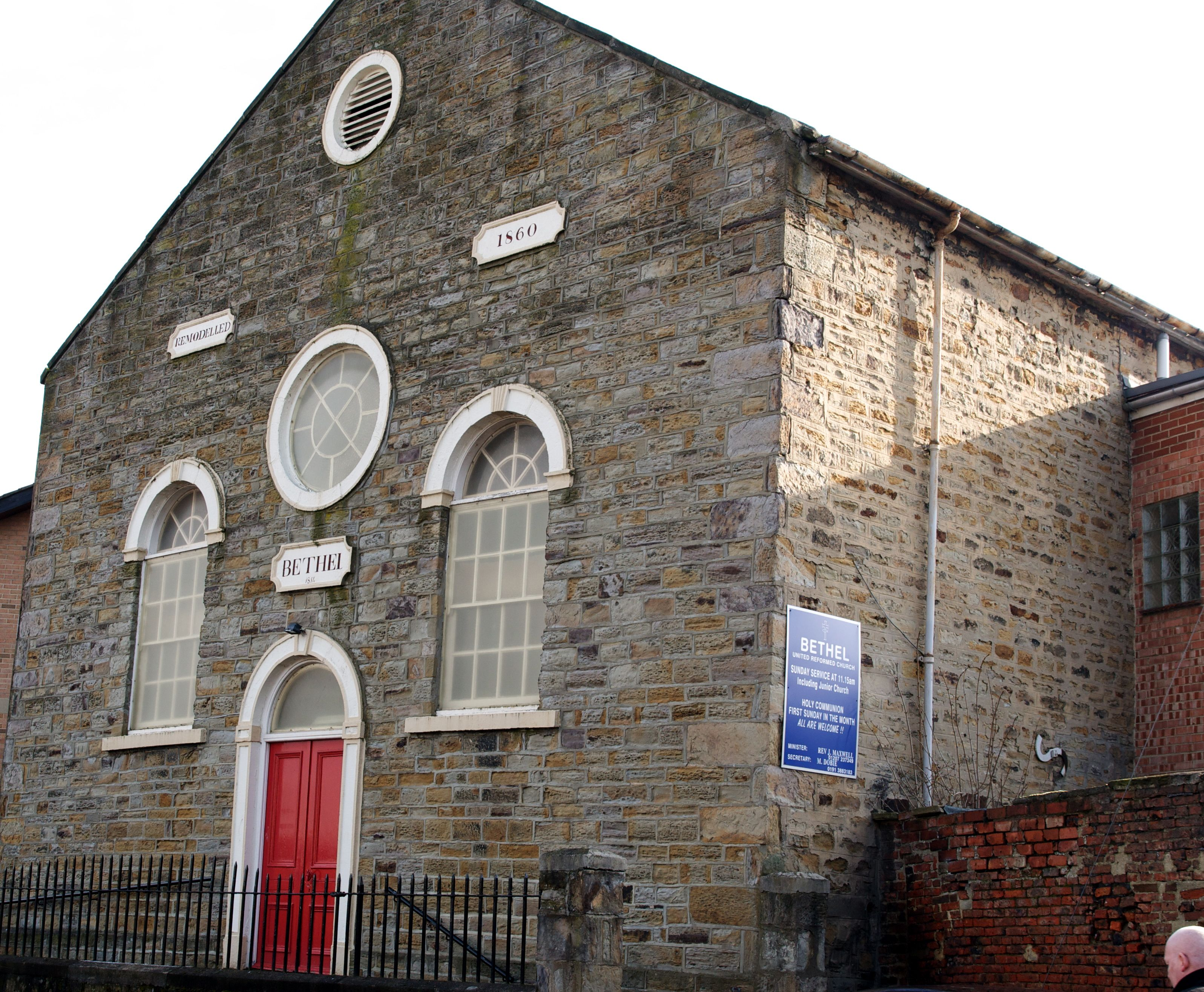
The Bethel United Reformed church on Low Chare

The small United Reformed Church on Low Chare, just off the main Front Street, was built in 1814 as the Bethel Congregational Chapel and remodelled in 1860. It is still in use and is a Grade II listed building.

== Transport ==
=== Railway ===
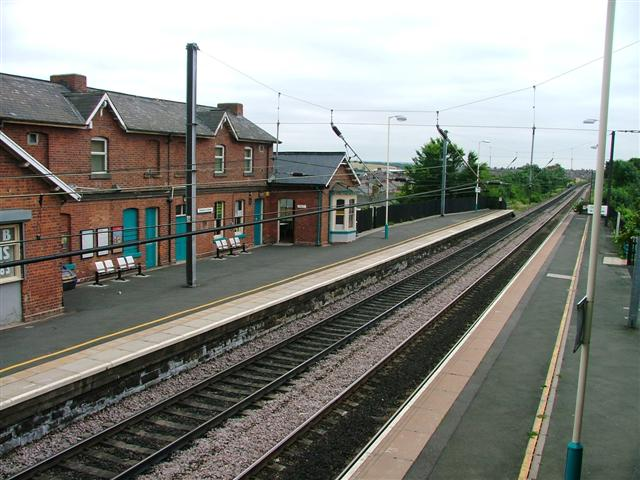
Chester-le-Street station

Chester-le-Street railway station is a stop on the East Coast Main Line of the National Rail network, between Newcastle and Durham; it opened in 1868. The station is served by two train operating companies:

- TransPennine Express provides services between Liverpool Lime Street, Manchester Victoria, Leeds, York, Durham and Newcastle;
- Northern Trains runs a limited service in early mornings and evenings; destinations include Newcastle, Carlisle and Darlington.

The station is managed by Northern Trains.

The town is mentioned in the 1963 song "Slow Train" by Flanders and Swann:

No churns, no porter, no cat on a seat,
At Chorlton-cum-Hardy or Chester-le-Street.

=== Buses ===
Chester-le-Street's bus services are operated primarily by Go North East and Arriva North East; routes connect the town with Newcastle-upon-Tyne, Durham, Middlesbrough and Seaham.

The town is the original home of The Northern General Transport Company, which has since grown into Go North East; it operated from the Picktree Lane Depot until 2023 when it was demolished. It also pioneered the use of Minilink bus services in the North East in 1985.

=== Roads ===
Front Street first carried the A1 road, between London and Edinburgh, through the town. A bypass was built in the 1950s, which still exists today as the A167. The bypass road itself was partly bypassed by, and partly incorporated in, the A1(M) motorway in the 1970s.

The northern end of Front Street was once the start of the A6127, which is the road that would continue through Birtley, Gateshead and eventually over the Tyne Bridge; it become the A6127(M) central motorway in Newcastle-upon-Tyne. However, when the Gateshead-Newcastle Western Bypass of the A1(M) was opened, many roads in this area were renumbered; they followed the convention that roads originating between single digit A roads take their first digit from the single digit A road in an anticlockwise direction from their point of origin. Newcastle Road, which was formerly designated A1, is now unclassified. The A6127 was renamed the A167. Car traffic is now banned from the northern part of Front Street; it is restricted to buses, cyclists and delivery vehicles.

== Education ==
=== Primary schools ===
- Cestria
- Bullion Lane
- Woodlea
- Lumley Junior and Infant
- Newker
- Red Rose
- Chester-le-Street CofE
- St Cuthbert's RCVA.

=== Secondary schools ===
- Park View School
- Hermitage Academy.

== Sport ==
=== Cricket ===
The Riverside Ground, known for sponsorship reasons as the Banks Homes Riverside, is home to Durham County Cricket Club which became a first class county in 1992. Since 1999, it has hosted many international fixtures, usually involving the England cricket team. The ground was also host to two fixtures at the 1999 Cricket World Cup and three at the 2019 Cricket World Cup.

Chester-le-Street Cricket Club is based at the Ropery Lane ground. They won the national ECB 45 over tournament in 2009 and reached the quarter-final of the national 20/20 club championship in 2009.

=== Rowing ===
Blade colours of Chester-le-Street rowing club

Chester-le-Street Amateur Rowing Club is based on the River Wear near the Riverside cricket ground and has been there for over 100 years. During the summer months the club operate mainly on the river, but in the winter move to indoor sessions during the evenings and use the river at weekends.

The club has over 160 members, of which 90 are junior members. It is a lead club for junior development with British Rowing and many juniors regularly compete at national level, with several competing for GB at international events.

=== Football ===
Medieval football was once played in the town. The game was played annually on Shrove Tuesday between the "Upstreeters" and "Downstreeters". Play started at 1pm and finished at 6pm. To start the game, the ball was thrown from a window in the centre of the town and in one game more than 400 players took part. The centre of the street was the dividing line and the winner was the side where the ball was (Up or Down) at 6pm. It was played from the Middle Ages until 1932, when it was outlawed by the police and people trying to carry on the tradition were arrested.

Chester-le-Street United F.C. were founded in 2020 and compete in the Northern Football League Division Two. In the 2022/23 season, they finished above their local rivals Chester-le-Street Town F.C., which was founded in 1972 and compete in the same division.

== Notable people ==
- Michael Barron, footballer
- Aidan Chambers, children's and young adults' author
- William Browell Charlton, trade union leader
- Alan Clark, musician Dire Straits
- Mark Clattenburg, former football referee
- Ellie Crisell, journalist and television presenter
- Ronnie Dodd, footballer
- Grant Leadbitter, footballer
- Sheila Mackie, artist
- Jock Purdon, folk singer and poet
- Adam Reach, footballer
- Bryan Robson, former England football captain
- Gary Robson, footballer
- Gavin Sutherland, conductor and pianist
- Colin Todd, football manager and former England international player
- Olga and Betty Turnbull, children's entertainers
- Kevin "Geordie" Walker, guitarist of post-punk group Killing Joke
- Peter Ward, footballer
- Bruce Welch of pop group The Shadows.

== Twin town ==
Chester-le-Street is twinned with:

- Kamp-Lintfort, Wesel, Germany.
