= Union Cafe =

Studio album by Penguin Cafe Orchestra
- Released: 1993
- Recorded: 1990–1993
- Genre: New Age
- Length: 73:40
- Label: Zopf
- Producer: Simon Jeffes

Penguin Cafe Orchestra chronology
When In Rome... (1988)	Union Cafe (1993)	Concert Program (1995)

Professional ratings
Review scores
Source	Rating
Allmusic	3.5/5 stars

Union Cafe is the fifth and final studio album by the Penguin Cafe Orchestra, released in 1993 under the Zopf label. The album was originally released only as a CD and cassette. It was never released on vinyl until 2017, when a double LP edition was finally released under the Erased Tapes label to commemorate the 20th anniversary since Simon Jeffes' passing.

== Track listing ==
All music composed by Simon Jeffes except as indicated.

1. "Scherzo And Trio" – 6:55
2. "Lifeboat (Lovers Rock)" – 7:15
3. "Nothing Really Blue" – 5:17
4. "Cage Dead" – 4:33
5. "Vega" – 10:20
6. "Yodel 3" – 3:25
7. "Organum" – 3:47
8. "Another One From Porlock" – 2:58
9. "Thorn Tree Wind" – 3:14
10. "Silver Star Of Bologna" – 4:05
11. "Discover America" (Traditional) – 3:02
12. "Pythagoras On The Line" – 1:50
13. "Kora Kora" – 3:04
14. "Lie Back And Think Of England" – 4:21
15. "Red Shorts" – 4:06
16. "Passing Through" – 5:28

== Personnel ==
- Khakberdy Allamurdov – drums
- Barbara Bolte – cor Anglais
- Belinda Bunt – violin
- Roger Chase – viola soloist
- Paul Cullington – bass
- Steve Fletcher – piano
- Roger Garland – violin
- Wilf Gibson – violin
- Roy Gillard – violin
- Tim Good – violin
- Simon Jeffes – arranger, bass, cuatro, guitar, harmonium, mandolin, omnichord, percussion, piano, Prophet 5, viola, violin
- Paul Kegg – cello
- Nigel Kennedy – violin
- Patrick Kiernan – violin
- Boguslav Kostecki – violin
- Kurban Kurbanov – accordion
- Chris Laurence – bass
- Helen Liebmann – cello, soloist
- Martin Loveday – cello
- Ian Maidman – bass, percussion
- Rita Manning – violin
- Peter McGowan – violin
- James McLeod – violin
- Peter Oxer – violin
- Tony Pleeth – cello
- Neil Rennie – ukulele
- Geoffrey Richardson – cello, clarinet, viola
- Sabir Rizaev – clarinet, soprano saxophone
- George Robertson – viola
- Roger Smith – cello
- Stephen Tees – viola
- Kathryn Tickell – Northumbrian smallpipes
- Naná Vasconcelos – clay pot
- Annie Whitehead – trombone
- Barry Wilde – violin
- Katie Wilkinson Khoroshunin – viola
- Gavyn Wright – soloist, violin
