= International Space Orchestra =

Space-scientist orchestra in California, U.S.

- Orchestra
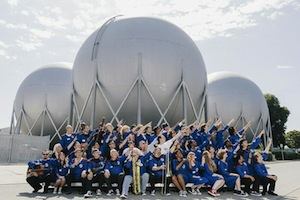
- The ISO in front of the Vacuum Chambers, NASA Ames Research Center, 2012
- Short name: ISO
- Founded: 2012, by Nelly Ben Hayoun-Stépanian
- Location: California, U.S.
- Music director: Evan Price
- Website: internationalspaceorchestra.com

The International Space Orchestra (ISO) is a California-based musical group comprising space scientists from the NASA Ames Research Center, SETI Institute, Singularity University, and the International Space University.

The International Space Orchestra was created (in 2012), assembled, and is directed by Nelly Ben Hayoun-Stépanian. The ISO's music director is the two-time Grammy Award–winning violinist and composer Evan Price. The ISO has collaborated with Kid Cudi, The Avalanches, Sigur Rós, Savages, The Prodigy, Beck, Bobby Womack, Damon Albarn, Maywa Denki, Bruce Sterling, and the Penguin Cafe Orchestra in a musical collaboration that took music into space.

Members of the ISO include Rusty Hunt (NASA LADEE Flight Director), Lewis S. G. Braxton III (NASA Ames Research Center Deputy Director), and Yvonne Cagle (NASA astronaut).

== Public space outreach ==
In the summer of 2012 in California, ISO performed Ground Control: An Opera in Space, a 27-minute-long performance partly scripted and based on the reenactment of the Apollo 11's mission control and partly a musical. Ground Control was composed by a team including Damon Albarn of Blur and Gorillaz, Bobby Womack, Richard Russell, Mike Smith (Music Director of Gorillaz), Arthur Jeffes of Penguin Cafe Orchestra, Maywa Denki (inventor of the Otamatone), and Evan Price, with a libretto by science-fiction author Bruce Sterling and author/filmmaker Jasmina Tešanović.

ISO's first performance took place in front of the 80- by 120-foot wind tunnel located at NASA Ames Research Center; its second was in San Jose, California, during the ZERO1 Biennial.

In addition, public talks by leading NASA and SETI Institute scientists were curated by Nelly Ben Hayoun-Stépanian, giving insights into missions that inspired the musical composition. These included presentations by Gerry Harp (SETI Institute Director of Research), Jacob Cohen (NASA Ames Research Center Chief Scientist), Roger Hunter (Kepler space telescope Mission Manager), and Rusty Hunt (NASA LCROSS/LADEE Flight Director).

In January 2013, the International Space Orchestra feature film had its world premiere at International Film Festival Rotterdam, where it was acclaimed by the critic as a "masterpiece" (Independent Cinema Office), a "real achievement" (DOMUS), and "as thrilling as watching a rocket launch" and "Spine Tingling" (The Guardian). This feature film was later screened at the INDABA Film Festival, the Z33 House Of Contemporary Art, the Victoria and Alber Museum, and the SXSW Interactive Festival in Austin, Texas.

In May 2013, the ISO performed at the Davies Symphony Hall, San Francisco, in front of 2,700 people, with singer Beck. In September 2013, the ISO was featured at the Beijing Design Week.

On April 19, 2016, the ISO performed at the historic Fillmore Auditorium, San Francisco, with the all-female British rock group Savages.

On September 24, 2016, the ISO opened for the Icelandic group Sigur Rós, playing their songs "Vidrar", "Olsen Olsen", "Hoppipola", and "Hafsol" (orchestrated and conducted by Gordon Lustig) to a sold-out audience of 17,500 at the Hollywood Bowl. After the set, members of the ISO also performed outreach as "Space Vikings" to members of the audience, educating the audience on space-research-related topics.

In November 2016, the ISO recorded tracks at 25th Street Recording in Oakland, California, to celebrate their recent collaborations with Savages and Sigur Rós.

The ISO also acts as an experiential and hybrid interdisciplinary research environment. Space scientists and engineers were invited to implement, deconstruct, perform, sing, mix, modify, and design musical acts in control rooms, acting as a provocation to imagine and disrupt human relationships with science and technology.

== Satellite carrying recordings into orbit ==
Ground Control: An Opera in Space was recorded at Skywalker Ranch, the George Lucas studio where Star Wars was developed.

On August 4, 2013, two ArduSat (Arduino-based Nanosatellites by the company NanoSatisfi) carrying the ISO recordings were launched aboard the H-IIB Launch Vehicle HTV-4 from Yoshinobu Launch Complex at the Tanegashima Space Center. A video of the launch is available for public access online.

On November 19, 2013, these ArduSat were released from the International Space Station by the six-member Expedition 38 crew. The orbiting residents worked with mission controllers around the world on deploying the ArduSat from Kibo's airlock on Tuesday the 19th at 7:10 a.m. EST.

In May 2015, the Italian astronaut Samantha Cristoforetti (of the European Space Agency) delivered the ISO recordings to the ISS during her space expedition record for longest single space flight by a woman (199 days, 16 hours) and for the longest uninterrupted spaceflight of a European astronaut.

== Orchestra members ==
Sources:

- Jacob Cohen (Chief scientist, NASA Ames Research Center) – gong
- Rusty Hunt (NASA Flight Director LCROSS Lunar Impactor, NASA Ames Research Center) – saxophone
- Barbara Jo Navarro (Asst. Chief, Flight Systems Implementation Branch at NASA Ames Research Center) – trumpet
- Yvonne Cagle (NASA Astronaut, NASA Ames Research Center) – bass drum and triangle
- Gregory D. Paulson (ARC-P, Universities Space Research Association) – trombone
- Mary Paulson (Gregory Paulson's mother) – flute and piccolo
- Ralph Bach (Analyst at NASA Ames Research Center, Aviation and Aerospace) – trumpet
- Frank Caradonna (Aeronautical engineer, NASA Ames Research Center, NASA Ames Jazz Band) – piano
- Robert "Bob" Crow (Retired, NASA Ames Jazz Band) – saxophone
- Matthew J. Daigle (Research Computer Scientist Intelligent Systems Division NASA Ames Research Center) – guitar
- Paul K. Davis (Instrument Development Technical Group, NASA Ames Research Center) – viola and violin
- Johnathan W. Conley (NASA Ames research Center) – percussion
- Larry Farnsley (Electrical Engineer, NASA Ames Jazz Band) – acoustic and electric bass
- Theodore Garbeff (Research engineer at the experimental fluid physics branch, NASA Ames Research Center) – violin
- Elisabeth B Gee Giessler (Dr. of Optometry) – violin
- Michael A. K. Gross (Software and systems engineer for SOFIA, NASA Ames) – trombone
- Lukas Gruendler (Research Assistant at SETI Institute) – trombone
- Vanessa Kuroda (Code RE Electronics Engineer, LADEE Communications, NASA Ames) – piano
- Matthew Linton (IT Security Specialist at NASA Ames Research Center) – cello
- Gregory Lindsay (NASA Ames Jazz Band) – drums
- Rodney Martin (Intelligent Systems Division, NASA Ames Research Center) – percussion and clarinet
- Veronica Phillips (Technical writer, Stinger Gaffarian Technologies, Inc.) – clarinet
- Annette Rodrigues (Former associate director for Center Operations at NASA Ames Research Center, NASA Ames Bluegrass Band) – ukulele
- David P. Roland (Optics Engineer, Telescope Technologist) – resonator guitar and ukulele
- Peter I. Robinson (Computer Scientist at NASA Ames Research Center) – bassoon
- Gregory K. Schmidt (Solar System Exploration Research Virtual Institute Deputy Director, NASA Ames Research Center; NASA Ames Bluegrass Band) – ukulele
- Arthur Schwartz (retired, founder and ex-officio member of the Air and Space Education Foundation) – French horn
- Michael A. Wilson (NASA Ames Astrobiology Institute) – saxophone
- Janice Bishop (Senior Research Scientist, SETI Institute) – clarinet
- Scott Poll (Intelligent Systems Division, NASA Ames Research Center) – violin
- Shea Comfort (worked for NASA on developing guidance systems for Mercury, Gemini & Apollo) – duduk
- Oliwia Baney (former Earth Science Researcher at NASA Ames) – cello

== Choir members ==
Sources:

- Aileen Aniciete (Administrative Assistant Intern, NASA Ames Research Center)
- Leighton Anunciacion (Technology Partnerships Division, Deltha-Critique. NASA Ames Research Center)
- Karen Bradford (Chief of Staff, NASA Ames Research Center)
- John L. Bresina (LCROSS/LADDEE Activity Planning & Command Sequencing Lead, NASA Ames Research Center)
- Craig D. Burkhard (Micro 6 Project Advisor, NASA Ames Research Center)
- John Cumbers (Synthetic Biology Program, NASA Ames Research Center)
- Zhenzhen Cumbers (John Cumbers' daughter)
- Emeline Paat-Dahlstrom (VP, Operations, Singularity University)
- Aleta Hayes (Lecturer, Stanford, and NASA Ames collaborator)
- Michaela Herman (Web developer, NASA Ames Research Center)
- Sarah Hobart (LADEE, Software and Space Systems manager NASA Ames Research Center)
- Geoffrey Lee (Project Manager, NASA Research Park)
- Derek Love (Office of Diversity and Equal Opportunity, NASA Ames Research Center)
- Laura Shawnee (Education Specialist at NASA Ames Research Center)
- Marianne Ryan (Director of Leadership & Engagement at Singularity University)
- Jasmina Tesanovic (ISO Librettist)
- Ellen Schwartz (Arthur Schwartz’s daughter)
- Jonathan Knowles (Design Chair, Singularity University)
- Jamie Drew (Science Manager, NASA Ames Research Center)
