= Surprise Supplies =

Live album by Caravan
- Released: 1999
- Recorded: 4 May 1976
- Venue: New Victoria Theatre, London
- Genre: Progressive rock, Canterbury scene
- Length: 55:18
- Label: HTD

Caravan chronology
Live: Canterbury Comes to London (1999)	Surprise Supplies (1999)	All Over You...Too (2000)

Professional ratings
Review scores
Source	Rating
AllMusic	2.0/5 stars

In 1976, Caravan played concerts to support the release of their latest album Blind Dog at St. Dunstans (1976). A recording of the show at the New Victoria Theatre in London on 4 May 1976 was released as Surprise Supplies featuring songs from Blind Dog at St. Dunstans plus "Love in Your Eye" from the 1972 album Waterloo Lily.

Recordings from a show recorded on 5 May (broadcast 17 May) for John Peel's BBC Radio show appear on the 1998 album Ether Way: BBC Sessions 1975-77.

== Track listing ==
1. "Here Am I" (Pye Hastings) – 6:15
2. "Chiefs and Indians" (Mike Wedgwood) – 5:22
3. "Can You Hear Me?" (Hastings) – 6:26
4. "All the Way" (Hastings) – 7:17
5. "A Very Smelly, Grubby Little Oik / Bobbing Wide / Come on Back / Oik (reprise)" (Hastings) – 13:01
6. "Love in Your Eye" – 16:57 (Richard Coughlan, Hastings, Richard Sinclair)

== Personnel ==
Caravan

- Pye Hastings – vocals, guitar
- Geoffrey Richardson – viola
- Jan Schelhaas – keyboards
- Mike Wedgwood – vocals, bass guitar
- Richard Coughlan – drums

Additional personnel

- Jimmy Hastings – clarinet, flute, saxophone

== Releases information ==
- 1999: CD HTD 96
- 2000: CD Import 70096
- 2002: CD Talking Elephant 039
