= Penguin Cafe Orchestra (album) =

Studio album by Penguin Cafe Orchestra
- Released: 1981
- Recorded: 1977–1980
- Genre: Ambient, chamber jazz
- Length: 47:28
- Label: E.G.
- Producer: Simon Jeffes

Penguin Cafe Orchestra chronology
Music from the Penguin Cafe (1976)	Penguin Cafe Orchestra (1981)	The Penguin Cafe Orchestra Mini Album (1983)

Penguin Cafe Orchestra is the second studio album by the Penguin Cafe Orchestra, released in 1981, and recorded between 1977 and 1980. By this album, the line-up for the band had expanded greatly, with contribution including Simon Jeffes, Helen Leibmann, Steve Nye, Gavyn Wright of the original quartet, as well as Geoff Richardson, Peter Veitch, Braco, Giles Leaman, Julio Segovia and Neil Rennie. All pieces were composed by Simon Jeffes except for "Paul's Dance" (Jeffes and Nye), "Cutting Branches" (traditional), and "Walk Don't Run" (by Johnny Smith). The cover painting is by Emily Young.

"Cutting Branches for a Temporary Shelter" is based on the traditional Zimbabwean song "Nhemamusasa", a field recording of which can be heard played on mbira on the Nonesuch Records album The Soul of the Mbira. "Telephone and Rubberband" was sampled by the band Spacehog for their song "In the Meantime".

== Critical reception ==
Professional ratings
Review scores
Source	Rating
AllMusic	4.5/5 stars
Robert Christgau	A−

The Boston Globe opined that "this is one of the most eccentric records released this or any year... It's also one of the most delightful."

In 2021, Penguin Cafe Orchestra was named among the fifty best albums of 1981 by Spin.

== Track listing ==
All tracks composed by Simon Jeffes; except where indicated

Side one

No.	Title	Writer(s)	Length
1.	"Air à Danser"		4:27
2.	"Yodel 1"		4:00
3.	"Telephone and Rubber Band"		2:25
4.	"Cutting Branches for a Temporary Shelter"	Traditional; arr. by Jeffes	3:36
5.	"Pythagoras's Trousers"		3:14
6.	"Numbers 1-4"		6:46

Side two

No.	Title	Writer(s)	Length
7.	"Yodel 2"		4:25
8.	"Salty Bean Fumble"		2:07
9.	"Paul's Dance"	Jeffes, Steve Nye	1:37
10.	"The Ecstasy of Dancing Fleas"		3:55
11.	"Walk Don't Run"	Johnny Smith	2:56
12.	"Flux"		1:39
13.	"Simon's Dream"		1:41
14.	"Harmonic Necklace"		1:12
15.	"Steady State"		3:28

== Personnel ==
- Simon Jeffes - guitar, cuatro, ukulele, piano, bass, violin, Dulcitone, harmonium, shakers, drums, ring modulator, rubber band, penny whistle, electric organ
- Braco - shakers, drums, bongos
- Giles Leaman - oboe
- Helen Liebmann - cello
- Steve Nye - electric piano, cuatro
- Neil Rennie - ukulele
- Geoffrey Richardson - viola, guitar, bass, bongos, metal frame, ukulele
- Julio Segovia - cymbals
- Peter Veitch - accordion, violin
- Gavyn Wright - violin
