= Signs of Life (Penguin Cafe Orchestra album) =

Studio album by Penguin Cafe Orchestra
- Released: March 1987
- Recorded: 1985–1987
- Genre: Instrumental folk
- Length: 50:36
- Label: E.G. Records
- Producer: Simon Jeffes

Penguin Cafe Orchestra chronology
Broadcasting from Home (1984)	Signs of Life (1987)	When in Rome (1988)

Professional ratings
Review scores
Source	Rating
Allmusic	4/5 stars

Signs of Life is the fourth studio album by the Penguin Cafe Orchestra. It was recorded at the Penguin Cafe between 1985 and 1987 and released in March 1987. It includes "Perpetuum Mobile", one of their most famous pieces. The album reached number 49 in the UK Albums Chart.

== Track listing ==
All music composed by Simon Jeffes.

=== Side one ===
1. "Bean Fields" - 4:20
2. "Southern Jukebox Music" - 4:39
3. "Horns of the Bull" - 4:32
4. "Oscar Tango" - 3:12
5. "The Snake and the Lotus (The Pond)" - 2:57
6. "Rosasolis" - 4:12

=== Side two ===
1. "Dirt" - 4:46
2. "Sketch" - 3:19
3. "Perpetuum Mobile" - 4:26
4. "Swing the Cat" - 3:19
5. "Wildlife" - 10:54

== Personnel ==
- Simon Jeffes - Ukulele/Violin/Omnichord (1), Bluthner Piano (2), Fretless Guitar/Ring Modulation (3), Bluthner and Bosendorfer Piano (4), Bass Guitar/Soloban Shakers (5), Omnichord/Prophet V (6), Rhythm Violins/Whistles (7), Cuatros/Ukulele/Bass/Drum (8), Bosendorfer Piano/Prophet V/Drum (9), Violins/Cuatro (10), Triangles/Guitar/Tape (11)
- Danny Cummins - Percussion (6), Shakare (7)
- Helen Liebmann - Cello (1, 2, 4, 6, 9, 10, 11)
- Bob Loveday - Violins/Bass (2), Harmony Violin (4), Violins (6), Solo Violin (7), Violins (9), Kalimba (10)
- Steve Nye - Bluthner Piano (1), Wurlitzer Piano (7)
- Elizabeth Perry - Violins (4, 9)
- Neil Rennie - Cuatro (1), Ukulele (7)
- Geoffrey Richardson - Viola (2, 4, 6)
- Gavyn Wright - Violins (4, 9)

== Other information ==
"Perpetuum Mobile" was sampled by Swedish DJ Avicii in his 2011 single "Penguin," aka "Fade into Darkness", which in turn was sampled by British recording artist Leona Lewis in her 2011 single "Collide".

Additionally, the song was used as the main theme for the film Mary and Max.
