= A Matter of Life... =

Studio album by Penguin Cafe
- Released: 31 January 2011
- Genre: Chamber jazz
- Length: 46:16
- Label: Penguin Cafe

A Matter of Life... is the debut album of chamber jazz group Penguin Cafe, released on 31 January 2011 through Penguin Cafe's own independent label.

== Critical reception ==
Professional ratings
Review scores
Source	Rating
The Guardian	3/5 stars
musicOMH	3.5/5 stars

Robin Denselow of The Guardian gave the album three stars, and described it as "some of the most unusual and delightful music of the last 40 years", which didn't quite match classics of the earlier Penguin Café Orchestra, but was an "impressive attempt".

"Stylistically, A Matter of Life... is a near-perfect match with the Penguin Café Orchestra of old. It is undeniably easy-listening background music, but of the best possible kind: it can be a passive soundtrack but generally stands up just as well to direct attention. There are no stand-out 'hits' – no 'Music for a Found Harmonium' or 'Telephone and Rubber Band' – and the whole can feel a bit lacking in substance, but in terms of its aims – "sort of a love letter to the original PCO music" – it's a definite success. As long as you know what to expect," wrote Mark Wilden of musicOMH, and gave the album 3.5 out of 5 stars.

== Track listing ==
No.	Title	Length
1.	"That, Not That"	4:20
2.	"Landau" (feat. Kathryn Tickell)	4:59
3.	"Sundog"	2:29
4.	"The Fox and the Leopard"	2:56
5.	"Finland"	4:54
6.	"Pale Peach Jukebox"	4:58
7.	"Harry Piers"	4:54
8.	"Two Beans Shaker"	1:58
9.	"From a Blue Temple"	8:37
10.	"Ghost in the Pond"	4:09
11.	"Coriolis"	2:02
Total length:		46:16
