= When in Rome (Penguin Cafe Orchestra album) =

When in Rome...

Live album by Penguin Cafe Orchestra
- Released: 24 October 1988
- Recorded: 9 July 1987
- Venue: Royal Festival Hall, London
- Genre: Instrumental folk
- Length: 52:23 (LP) 68:22 (CD)
- Label: E.G. Records
- Producer: Simon Jeffes

Penguin Cafe Orchestra chronology
Signs of Life (1987)	When in Rome... (1988)	Union Cafe (1993)

Professional ratings
Review scores
Source	Rating
Allmusic	3/5 stars

When in Rome... is a 1988 live album by the Penguin Cafe Orchestra, and was recorded at The Royal Festival Hall, London, on 9 July 1987. It was produced by Simon Jeffes and published by E.G. Records. The cover painting is by Emily Young.

The CD edition included four extra tracks not featured on the LP edition.

== LP release ==
Side 1

1. "Air a Danser" (5:17)
2. "Yodel 1" (4:46)
3. "From the Colonies" (3:30)
4. "Southern Jukebox Music" (4:53)
5. "Numbers 1 to 4" (7:44)

Side 2

1. "Beanfields" (4:28)
2. "Paul's Dance" (2:19)
3. "Oscar Tango" (3:20)
4. "Music for a Found Harmonium" (3:18)
5. "Isle of View (Music for Helicopter Pilots)" (4:39)
6. "Prelude and Yodel" (3:56)
7. "Giles Farnaby's Dream" (4:13)

== CD release ==
1. "Air a Danser" (5:17)
2. "Yodel 1" (4:46)
3. "Cutting Branches for a Temporary Shelter" (2:27)
4. "From the Colonies" (3:30)
5. "Southern Jukebox Music" (4:53)
6. "Numbers 1 to 4" (7:44)
7. "Telephone and Rubber Band" (4:05)
8. "Air" (4:00)
9. "Beanfields" (4:28)
10. "Paul's Dance" (2:19)
11. "Oscar Tango" (3:20)
12. "Music for a Found Harmonium" (3:18)
13. "Isle of View (Music for Helicopter Pilots)" (4:39)
14. "Prelude and Yodel" (3:56)
15. "Dirt" (5:27)
16. "Giles Farnaby's Dream" (4:13)

== Personnel ==
- Simon Jeffes - Guitar, pianica (3), bass (5, 12, 15), cuatro (7, 10, 16), ukelele (4, 9), electric guitar (13, 14)
- Helen Liebmann - Cello
- Bob Loveday - Violin
- Jennifer Maidman - Percussion, bass (1), cuatro (10)
- Steve Nye - Piano, electric piano, harmonium, cuatro (10)
- Neil Rennie - Ukelele, cuatro (1, 9)
- Geoffrey Richardson - Viola, bass (2), mandolin (9), ukelele (10), cuatro (14), electric guitar/penny whistles (15)
- Julio Segovia - Percussion
- Paul Street - Cuatro, ukelele (4, 7, 9), guitar (10, 13, 14)
