= Music from the Penguin Cafe =

Studio album by Penguin Cafe Orchestra
- Released: 1976
- Recorded: 1974–1976
- Genres: Pop; chamber music; minimalism; avant-folk; chamber jazz; modern classical
- Length: 44:57
- Label: E.G.
- Producers: Simon Jeffes; Steve Nye; Brian Eno (executive)

Penguin Cafe Orchestra chronology
Music from the Penguin Cafe (1976)	Penguin Cafe Orchestra (1981)

Professional ratings
Review scores
Source	Rating
Allmusic	3/5 stars

Music from the Penguin Cafe is the first studio album by the Penguin Cafe Orchestra. It was recorded between 1974 and 1976, and released in 1976.

The artist credited for the work varies with different issues. Upon original issue, the label credited the artist as Simon Jeffes, while the cover gave the artist as "members of the Penguin Café Orchestra". The line-up for tracks 1, 9, 10 and 11 consisted of the original "Penguin Café Quartet" (as they are referred to in the liner notes): Simon Jeffes (electric guitar), Helen Liebmann (Cello), Steve Nye (electric piano), and Gavyn Wright (violin). Tracks 2–8, meanwhile, were performed by the ensemble "Zopf", which includes all four members of the quartet as well as Neil Rennie (ukulele) and Emily Young (vocals).

Reissues from 1981 forward generally credit the artist as the Penguin Cafe Orchestra. These later reissues have mistakenly listed pieces 2–8 as though they were movements of a suite entitled "Zopf", instead of 7 separate pieces performed by "Zopf".

The executive producer for the album was Brian Eno, who released this album on his experimental Obscure label, with catalogue number "Obscure 7". The original cover was by John Bonis. The reissue cover painting was by Emily Young. The album was later released on CD by E.G. Records in 1991 and later in remastered form in 2006, both using the reissue cover instead of the original.

The album was included in Robert Dimery's 1001 Albums You Must Hear Before You Die.

== Track listing ==
All words composed by Neil Rennie

Side one
No.	Title	Writer(s)	Length
1.	"Penguin Cafe Single"	Simon Jeffes, Steve Nye, Gavyn Wright, Helen Leibmann	6:16
2.	"From the Colonies" (for N.R.)	Jeffes	1:38
3.	"In a Sydney Motel"	Jeffes	2:28
4.	"Surface Tension (Where the Trees Meet the Sky)"	Jeffes	2:22
5.	"Milk"	Jeffes	2:22
6.	"Coronation"	Jeffes	1:33
7.	"Giles Farnaby's Dream"	Jeffes, Giles Farnaby	2:19
8.	"Pigtail"	Jeffes	2:44

Side two
No.	Title	Writer(s)	Length
9.	"The Sound of Someone You Love Who's Going Away and It Doesn't Matter"	Jeffes, Nye, Wright, Leibmann	11:46
10.	"Hugebaby"	Jeffes, Nye, Wright, Leibmann	4:48
11.	"Chartered Flight"	Jeffes, Nye, Wright, Leibmann	6:41

Tracks 1, 9–11 performed by the Penguin Cafe Quartet.

Tracks 2–8 performed by Zopf.

== Personnel ==
Penguin Cafe Orchestra

- Simon Jeffes – electric guitar, bass, ukulele, cuatro, spinet, electric piano, mouth percussion, sheng, ring modulator, vocals
- Steve Nye – electric piano, engineer
- Helen Liebmann – cello
- Gavyn Wright – violin, viola

with:

- Emily Young – vocals on "Milk" and "Coronation", cover painting
- Neil Rennie – ukulele on "Giles Farnaby's Dream"
