= Nelly Ben Hayoun-Stépanian =

French artist and filmmaker (born 1985)

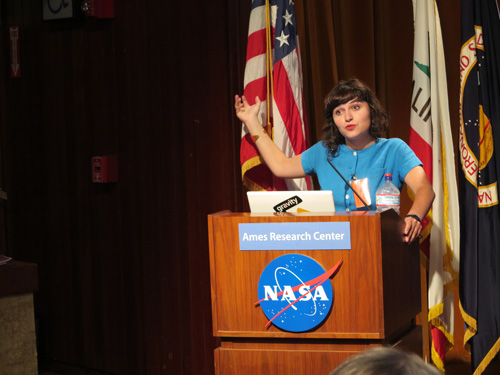
- Born: 1985; Valence, Drôme, France
- Occupations: Designer of Experiences, Director
- Website: nellyben.com

Nelly Ben Hayoun-Stépanian is a designer, artist and filmmaker born in France of Armenian and Algerian descent, based in London. She serves on the Advisory Council of METI (Messaging Extraterrestrial Intelligence) and is the designer of experiences at the SETI Institute (Search for Extraterrestrial Intelligence Institute). She is also an exhibitor and keynote speaker who has worked with museums and design centres across the world.

Ben Hayoun-Stépanian collaborated with Kid Cudi, The Avalanches, Sigur Rós, Savages, The Prodigy, Beck, Bobby Womack, Damon Albarn, Maywa Denki, Bruce Sterling and Penguin Café in a musical collaboration that took music into space. Launched from a Japanese launch pad in August 2013, she assembled the International Space Orchestra (ISO)—the worlds first orchestra of space scientists from NASA Ames Research Center, Singularity University, International Space University and the SETI Institute.

== History ==
In 2013, Icon Magazine nominated Ben Hayoun-Stépanian as one of the 50 international designers “shaping the future”.

In 2014, Wired Magazine awarded her a WIRED Innovation fellowship for her work and for its potential to make a “significant impact on the world”.

In 2015, she was nominated for a Women of the Year Achievement Award. Since 1955, the award has recognized women 'who have made a significant achievement' and 'are being recognised for their strides in making the world a better place'.

Also in 2015, she released her feature film Disaster Playground, based on an investigation of emergency procedures for disasters such as earth-bound rogue asteroids.

In 2016, she began work on her next project, a feature film, digital platform and exhibition entitled “The Life, the Sea and the Space Viking”.

In 2017, Ben Hayoun founded the of the Underground, a tuition-free, transnational postgraduate institution based in underground spaces in London and Amsterdam. It offers a Master’s degree in Design of Experiences and supports unconventional, pluralistic research. Working with cultural institutions and nightlife venues, the university challenges existing power structures through events, designed situations, and immersive experiences while supporting countercultures over the long term. For this, Ben Hayoun-Stépanian was appointed "Ambassador for the Underground" by the independent self-declared artist republic Užupis in 2019.

In 2019, Ben Hayoun-Stépanian released her feature film I am (not) a Monster where, armed with puppets and dressed as Hannah Arendt, she teases great thinkers of our age whilst challenging them to an impossible pursuit: to find the origins of knowledge. For the film, and for advocating pluralistic thinking and thinking in action, she was appointed a fellow of the Hannah Arendt center for Politics and Humanities at Bard College.

In 2020, Ben Hayoun-Stépanian became a grantee of the Sundance Institute with Red Moon, her new documentary currently in production. Through role-play, magic and doppelgängers, it offers an experimental vision and template for future diasporas beyond Earth. Set in Algeria, Armenia and France, the film asks, "How will human inhabitants of the moon understand origin, borders and nations?" Ben Hayoun-Stépanian also investigates her family origins in Algeria and Armenia, which led to the start of Nelly Boum Show, her radio show on underground radio's Worldwide FM. Every month, the show explores a theme in a multiverse of possible new futures, touching on economy, politics, and other systems through music and conversation, including a focus on North African and caucasian music and experts.

In 2020, Ben Hayoun took the artist name Nelly Ben Hayoun-Stépanian. She is now represented by former MET Museum curator Beatrice Galilee.

Ben Hayoun is a member of the International Astronautical Federation and the Space Outreach and Education committee, and is vice-chair of the Committee for the Cultural Utilisation of Space (ITACCUS) at the International Astronautical Federation.

== Background ==
Ben Hayoun is a visiting professor at the Architectural Association School of Architecture (Unknown Fields Division) and the Royal College of Art. She was a senior a lecturer and researcher at Central Saint Martins where she won the CSM University of the Arts Teaching Award in 2016.

Ben Hayoun is a contributing writer at Domus and Design Indaba and guest writer at We Make Money Not Art, Blueprint and Bruce Sterling’s blog "Beyond the Beyond" on Wired.

Ben Hayoun initially trained in painting then Textile Design at Olivier de Serres National College of Art and Design in Paris and then graduated from Design Interactions (MA) at the Royal College of Art. She holds a PhD in Human Geography and Political Philosophy from Royal Holloway, University of London, UK under the supervision of Professor Harriet Hawkins.

== Designer of Experiences at SETI Institute ==
Ben Hayoun was appointed Designer of Experiences at the SETI Institute under the supervision of David Morrison, Jill Tarter, Franck Marchis and Frank Drake in May 2013. Her work at SETI focuses on extending outreach activities and design in terms of scope, scale, and methods of engagement towards architecture, installations, environments, social system, performances, experiences and narratives, as events.

== Extreme fieldwork ==
Ben Hayoun speaks about the value of ‘extreme’ fieldwork which she considers an essential part of designer training. For Ben Hayoun, designing experiences implies tangibility, hence fieldwork, and working collaboratively with experts. Ben Hayoun’s design practice brought her investigation to the empty lands of Chernobyl Exclusion Zone and the Large Hadron Collider, CERN situated 100m below ground. She has also collided atoms at SLAC, trapped herself in a Soyuz rocket capsule in Baikonur Cosmodrome, and experienced a sonic Booum in the neutrino Observatory Super Kamiokande in Japan.

About her practice she said: "My working method is to go in situ in scientists’ research centres and design events that radically change and adapt their attitudes to their research to a non-scientific audience’s creative needs. Design should be embedded in a physical experience, it should be something you remember like seeing a painting and remembering the tone of it."

== Director of the International Space Orchestra (ISO) ==
Alongside her role as designer of experiences at the SETI Institute, Ben Hayoun is directing the International Space Orchestra. The International Space Orchestra is a project she created and assembled over the summer of 2012. It is composed of a team of space scientists from the NASA Ames Research Center, SETI Institute (Search for Extraterrestrial Life), Singularity University, and the International Space University.

In January 2013, the International Space Orchestra feature film had its world premiere at the Rotterdam International Film Festival where it was acclaimed as a "masterpiece" by the Independent Cinema Office (ICO), a "real achievement" (DOMUS), "as thrilling as watching a rocket launch" and "Spine Tingling" (The Guardian).

On April 19, 2016, the International Space Orchestra performed at the historic Fillmore Auditorium, San Francisco, with the all-female British rock group the Savages.

On September 24, 2016, the International Space Orchestra opened for the Icelandic group Sigur Rós, playing the Sigur Rós songs Vidrar, Olsen Olsen, Hoppipola and Hafsol (orchestrated and conducted by Gordon Lustig) to a sold-out audience of 17,500 at the Hollywood Bowl. After their set, members of ISO also performed outreach as "Space Vikings" to members of the audience, educating the audience on space research related topics.

In November 2016, the International Space Orchestra recorded tracks at 25th Street Recording in Oakland, California to celebrate their recent collaborations with rock band Savages and Icelandic group Sigur Rós.

== Launch in space ==
Ben Hayoun's work Ground Control: An Opera in Space, performance recordings by the International Space Orchestra was released from the International Space Station in November, 2013.

On 4 August 2013, two ArduSat (Arduino based Nanosatellite run by the company Nanosatisfi) carrying the ISO recordings of Ground Control: An Opera in Space were launched aboard the H-IIB Launch Vehicle, HTV-4 from Yoshinobu Launch Complex at the Tanegashima Space Centre.

On 19 November 2013, these ArduSat got released from the International Space Station by the six-member Expedition 38 crew. The orbiting residents worked with mission controllers around the world on deploying the ArduSat from Kibo’s airlock Tuesday 19 at 7:10 a.m. EST.

The recordings of Ground Control: An Opera in Space was recorded at Skywalker Ranch, George Lucas' studio, where Star Wars was developed.

== Director of the Disaster Playground ==
In 2015, Nelly Ben Hayoun released her feature film Disaster Playground. The film is based on an investigation of emergency procedures for disasters such as earth-bound rogue asteroids. The film includes an original soundtrack featuring electronic music label Ed Banger Records and The Prodigy and also features an orchestration by the International Space Orchestra. The film's world Premiere took place at SXSW, and Sheffield Doc/Fest. Disaster Playground is a large multi-platform project with a number of components including a feature film, a digital platform and an exhibition. It was one of Indiewire's six highlights of SXSW in 2015 and was selected as part of the visions category. Senior Curator at MOMA, Paola Antonelli reviewed the film, saying ‘It's Dr. Strangelove meets This Is Spinal Tap. You straddle a big red phone and go on a wild ride along a chain of command that is complex and exhilarating.’ The film was also screened at the BFI in London, in June 2015.

== The Life, The Sea & The Space Viking ==
In 2016, Nelly Ben Hayoun began work on her next project: feature film, digital platform and exhibition entitled “The Life, the Sea and the Space Viking”. Described as a ‘Space Odyssey and Viking Saga 11km under the sea’, the picture will attempt to herald a submersible expedition and in turn an encounter with ‘biological archeology’. Merging the fields of astrobiology, terraforming and the research of extremophiles, the project features leading scientists at NASA and the SETI (Search for Extraterrestrial Intelligence) Institute documenting how minute life on Earth can inform colonization across distant planets

== Head of Experiences at WeTransfer ==
In December 2013, Nelly Ben Hayoun announced her collaboration with file sharing service, WeTransfer. Every week WeTransfer features an entry from Ben Hayoun’s visual diary, documenting her experiential practices and collaborations.

About the collaboration she said:

"WeTransfer's 18 million monthly active users will be able to experience the places I go, the activities I do and the people I meet. Each entry will be numbered so people can follow the diaries as they are published," This will extend into a further storytelling platform that will incorporate the service's app, she explains. "I have my practice, which is all about bringing the scientific and creative communities together through carefully designed experiences, and ultimately WeTransfer is about creating unique experiences for their community of digital users."

== Director University of the Underground ==
Dr. Nelly Ben Hayoun is the director of The University of the Underground, a tuition free postgraduate university hosted at the Sandberg Instituut and located in the 'underground, within a hidden network of urban spaces', under nightclubs Village Underground in London and De Marktkantine in Amsterdam. It provides an accredited Master of the Arts (MA Design of Experiences) which 'exists at the nexus between critical design, experiential, theatrical, filmic, semiotics, political and musical practices'; and which ' aims to teach students how to engineer situations, to design experiences and events to best support social dreaming, social actions and power shifts within institutions, companies and governments'.

The Sandberg's Instituut is the postgraduate programme of the Gerrit Rietveld Academie in Amsterdam. The University of the Underground is established as a foundation in Amsterdam, composed of a multidisciplinary team as part of its advisory board, guest tutors and teaching team. The University of the Underground responds to the current trend of increased fees for postgraduate programmes by firstly proposing a model in which students are provided with scholarships to cover their tuition fees. The University of the Underground is providing students with scholarships, through public and private donations, to cover their tuitions and members of the public with series of live events, podcasts and experimental editorial content. Dr. Ben Hayoun said " We are committed to making all our finances public and we are transparent in this process"

Some of the University of the Underground's Advisory Board Members include political activist Prof. Noam Chomsky, MoMA curator Paola Antonelli, author Dave Eggers, Ted Prize winner and SETI scientist Dr. Jill Tarter. Guest Tutors include graphic Designer Paula Scher, science fiction author Bruce Sterling, experimental architect Prof. Rachel Armstrong, blogger Regine Debatty, poet Dana Gioia, sociologist Emma Dabiri and Michael Bierut among others.

== Lectures, talks and speeches ==
Ben Hayoun has delivered keynote lectures in many countries on design and teaching design, experience design and space public outreach.

- 2017 Re:publica 'Design the Impossible' Keynote Speaker, Berlin, Germany
- 2017 Design Indaba Conference, Keynote Speaker, Cape Town, South Africa
- 2017 Convergence, 'Disruptions: a healthy dose of rule-breaking and trouble-making', London, UK
- 2017 LEGO, Lego Innovation Talks, Billund, Denmark
- 2017 BFI, 'Hidden Figures' Panel Discussion, London, UK
- 2016 The New School, New York, USA
- 2016 IxDA Awards, Santiago, Chile
- 2016 The Metropolitan Museum, 'In Our Time: A Year of Architecture in a Day' Symposium', New York, USA
- 2016 Aerial Future Symposium, Keynote Speaker, Venice Italy
- 2016 Dent:Space, Keynote Speaker 'Designing the Impossible', San Francisco, USA
- 2016 67th International Astronautical Congress, co-chairing the E1.9 session_ Space Culture, Guadalajara, Mexico
- 2016 AirBnb, 'Designing the Impossible', San Francisco, CA, USA
- 2016 Red Bull, Salzburg, Germany
- 2016 The Next Web Conference, 'Above and beyond: the design of the impossible', Amsterdam, the Netherlands
- 2016 IDEO, Palo Alto, California, USA
- 2016 Autodesk HQ, California, USA
- 2016 Future Everything, Manchester, UK
- 2016 Meta Morf, Trondheim, Norway
- 2015 American Institute For Graphic Arts (AIGA) National Conference, 'Designing the Impossible' Keynote Speaker, New Orleans, USA
- 2015 American Institute For Graphic Arts (AIGA), 'Design Lecture Series', Keynote Speaker, San Francisco, USA
- 2015 Mattel Inc, Los Angeles, California, USA
- 2015 Resonate, Keynote Speaker, Belgrade, Serbian
- 2015 International Film Festival of Science and Technology, Moscow, Russia
- 2015 Google, 'Designing the Impossible' Talks at Google, London, UK
- 2015 66th International Astronautical Conference, Jerusalem, Israel
- 2015 If Willy Wonka Was A Designer, Stockholm, Sweden
- 2015 Google Creative Retreat, Marrakesh, Morocco
- 2015 Impact Hub, Cluj-Napoca, Romania
- 2015 DocFest, Sheffield, UK
- 2015 Microsoft Research, Cambridge, UK
- 2015 BBC Radio 4, London, UK
- 2015 Sheffield Doc, Meet the Artist-Filmmakers: Working Across Gallery and Cinema Settings, Sheffield, UK
- 2015 Google HQ, Talks at Google Series, Palo Alto, USA
- 2014 You Are In Control Conference, Keynote Speaker, Reykjavik, Iceland
- 2014 Icelandic Design Centre, 'Creative Synergy', Reykjavik, Iceland
- 2014 University of Gothenburg, Seminar, Gothenburg, Sweden
- 2014 London Design Festival, 'Disaster Playground', London, UK
- 2014 STREAM Conference, Athens, Greece
- 2014 Royal Geographical Society Annual International Conference, Crafting critical geographies: The Design of Experiences, London, UK
- 2014 Wired Conference, 'Meet Nelly Ben Hayoun, Director of the International Space Orchestra', London, UK
- 2014 65th International Astronautical Congress, co-chairing the E1.9 session on Space Culture. Toronto, Canada
- 2014 SXSW, Keynote Speaker at SXSW Interactive in Austin, Austin, USA
- 2014 Webstock, Keynote Speaker, Wellington, New Zealand
- 2014 What Design Can Do, Keynote Speaker, Amsterdam, Netherlands.
- 2014 Wow Women of the World Festival, Southbank Centre, London
- 2014 SCL Bits, Keynote Speaker, Mexico City, Mexico
- 2014 CPH:DOX: Conference, Copenhagen, Denmark
- 2013 It's Nice That, Here 2013, 'Manufacturing the Impossible', London, UK
- 2013 NASA Ames Research Centre, 4th International Space Arts Workshop, Singularity University, CA, USA
- 2013 CII-NID Design Summit, 'Designing the Future', New Delhi, India
- 2012 NASA Ames Research Centre, 'Designing Experiences', mountain view, CA, USA
- 2012 SETI Institute, 'Designer of Experiences', Mountain view, USA
- 2012 International Space Orchestra Talk Series, chaired and curated by Ben Hayoun. Speakers: NASA Chief of Science Jacob Cohen, SETI Institute Head of Research Gerry Harp, NASA Kepler Mission Manager Roger Hunter, NASA Flight Director Rusty Hunt. ZERO1 Biennial, San Jose, California.
- 2012 Design Indaba, 'Designing Experiences', Cape Town, South Africa
- 2012 Musée des Arts et Métiers in partnership with La Gaîté Lyrique, Conference, Paris, France
- 2012 International Symposium on Art Research, Paris, France
- 2012 Tama University, Tokyo, Japan
- 2011 Chernobyl Exclusion Zone, 'Unknown Fields Division', Ukraine
- 2011 Royal Geographical Society Annual International Conference, Crafting critical geographies: The Design of Experiences, London, UK
- 2011 Sofia Design Week Festival, Sofia, Bulgaria
- 2011 Festarch Festival, International Architecture Festival, Perugia, Italy
- 2011 Design Indaba, Masterclass on Teaching Design, Cape Town, South Africa
- 2010 PechaKucha, Tel Aviv, Israel

== Exhibitions ==
- 2016 The International Space Orchestra, Performance at the Hollywood Bowl with Sigur Rós, Los Angeles, CA, USA
- 2016 Disaster Playground, Paris Science Film Festival, Museum Of Natural History, Paris, France
- 2016 Disaster Playground, KOSMICA, Toluca, Mexico
- 2016 Disaster Playground, Docs Against Gravity, Warsaw, Poland
- 2016 The International Space Orchestra, Performance at the [Filmmore Theatre], with Savages, San Francisco, CA, USA
- 2016 Disaster Playground, [Docville], Leuven, Belgium
- 2015 The Soyuz Chair, Nationalmuseum Design, Stockholm, Sweden
- 2015 Disaster Playground, CPH: DOX, Copenhagen, Denmark
- 2015 Disaster Playground, Victoria & Albert Museum, London UK
- 2015 Disaster Playground, BFI, London, UK
- 2015 Disaster Playground, Roxie Cinema, San Francisco, USA
- 2015 Disaster Playground UK Premier: Sheffield Doc Fest, UK
- 2015 Disaster Playground World Premiere: SXSW 2015, Texas, USA
- 2014 Disaster Playground: A Preview, Victoria and Albert Museum, London, UK
- 2014, Coming soon, Bureau Europa, Maastricht, NL
- 2014 Disaster Playground: A Pre-enactement, Mu-eindhoven, Nl
- 2014 Future Fiction, Z33, Hasselt, Belgium
- 2013 Design and Violence, MOMA, NYC, USA
- 2013 The International Space Orchestra at the UCCA, Beijing Design Week, Beijing, China
- 2013 The International Space Orchestra film and Disaster Playground project at the Victoria and Albert Museum V&A, London, UK
- 2013 The International Space Orchestra, Performance at the Davies Symphony Hall with singer Beck, San Francisco, CA, USA
- 2013 The International Space Orchestra exhibition in Z33, House for Contemporary Arts, Hasselt, Belgium
- 2013 The International Space Orchestra, Feature Film, 57mins, World Premiere at IFFR, International Film Festival Rotterdam
- 2012 Designer in Residency at La Gaîté Lyrique as part of the Technology of the Everyday's programme, Paris
- 2012 The International Space Orchestra, ZERO1 Biennial, The Arts and Technology Center, San Jose, California, USA
- 2012 Live Performance, The International Space Orchestra in front of World Largest 80X120 foot Windtunnel, NASA Ames Research Center, California, USA, co-produced with XL Recordings and Penguin Café Ltd
- 2011 What if, National Museum of China, First Beijing Internationale Design Triennial, China
- 2011 Glitch Fiction, Paris first Design Week, Cité de la mode et du design, Paris, France
- 2011 Forwards to Mars, British Council, London, UK
- 2011 Micronations Revolution, a show directed, curated, written & co-produced by Nelly Ben Hayoun for Shunt, London, UK
- 2010 Prédiction, International Design Biennial 2010 of St Stienne, France
- 2010 What if.., Welcome Trust, London, UK
- 2010 Super K Sonic BOOOOum 2 Gold, a project directed, designed and curated by Nelly Ben Hayoun, Manchester Science Festival, UK
- 2010 The Soyuz Chair, Cube Gallery and Festival Manchester, UK
- 2010 Interventions, Exhibition of 5 design collaborations with 5 social scientists, NewCastle University, Scotland
- 2009 Super K Sonic Boooum, SHUNT, London, UK
- 2009 What if? Science Gallery, Dublin, Ireland
- 2006 Gooood Food International Design Biennial, St-Etienne, France
- 2006 Cosmetiqu’a la coque at the Palais de Tokyo, Paris, France

== Awards, jury and fellowships ==
- 2022 Karman Project Fellowship
- June 2017 Jury member for D&AD impact Design Awards - Education category
- June 2017 Elected One of the "Top 50 Creative Leaders driving change in the world at large", Creative Review
- March 2017 Elected One of the "Top 50 most inspirational women in architecture and design", Dezeen
- March 2017 Nominated 3 times as one of the "150 Female creative leader 2017, redefining the creative industries", The Dots
- 2016 Jury Chair for WIRED Innovation in Experience Design
- 2016 Teaching Award UAL University of the Arts London, Central Saint Martins
- 2016 Jury Member for Future of Engaging for the Interaction Design Association
- 2016 Best Of The Year Selection, The Life, the Sea and the Space Viking, The Metropolitan Museum, New York
- 2015 Netflix, Selection Highlight Documentary, Disaster Playground
- 2015 Nominated, Vision Award, Disaster Playground SXSW
- 2015 Nominated, Artefact Award, Disaster Playground, Sheffield Doc Fest, UK
- 2015 Nominated, Barclays Women Of The Year Achievement Award
- 2015 Finalist Jarman Award
- 2014 Awarded WIRED Magazine Inaugural Innovation Fellowship, for her work to date and for its potential to make a “significant impact on the world”
- 2014-2015 Awarded Design Fellowship at Akademie Schloss Solitude, Stuttgart, Germany
- 2014 Winner Arts Council England Exceptional Award with the project Disaster Playground, UK
- 2013–Ongoing Appointed Designer of Experiences at SETI Institute, USA, CA
- 2011 Design Indaba Young Designers Award, Cape Town, South Africa
- 2010 Winner – Science in Society Award by Science & Technology Facilities Council (STFC)- UK
- 2010 Winner – Public Engagement Grant Scheme by IOP (Institute Of Physics) UK and Ireland
- 2010 Winner – OUTPUT Grand Prix, International Award, Netherlands
- 2010 Design fellow at Queen Mary University, Physics Department, London, UK
- 2010 Finalist – European Creative Innovation Award, Spain
- 2009 Winner – Blueprint Award – Group Award, London Design Festival, UK
- 2009 Winner – Royal College of Art Society prize, UK; the criteria are for a work that shows exceptional skill and innovation in a particular discipline, and is critical and challenging across the area of art and design
- 2009 Nominated – Helen Hamlyn Design Award, UK
