= Road Dreams =

British television series

Road Dreams is a series of six television programmes, each of approximately 25 minutes duration, last shown on British terrestrial television in the early 1990s on Channel 4.

The programmes were created by Elliott Bristow, being a compilation of Super 8 mm film footage filmed by Bristow during an extended stay in the United States. Each programme opens with the following text: "In 1968 Elliott Bristow went to New York for a two week holiday. In 1980, after twelve years and 500,000 miles on the road in America he returned to England with three trunks containing 75 hours of silent Super 8 film - his diary of this 'holiday'!"

The programmes depict Bristow's journeys across the USA. Many pieces were filmed whilst driving; others show Bristow's friends and locations he visited. Because of the source material, the technical quality of the programme suffers; some may consider this to be part of the charm of the work.

The footage is accompanied by occasional explanatory comments from Bristow, readings by Mark Murphy (mainly from the works of Jack Kerouac and Thomas Wolfe) and music tracks. The music is mainly but not exclusively instrumental classical and new-age music. A DVD with 13 short films using the Road Dreams footage is available and four of the original six original episodes can be viewed on YouTube.

A book titled "Home in October: Twenty-one Years of Road Dreams" by Elliot Bristow was published in a hardcover edition of 192 pages by Mainstream Publishing in September 1991, ISBN 1-85158-334-3. According to Bristow, this book never made it past the proposal stage, and was erroneously publicised by an over-enthusiastic publisher.

An ebook "Road Dreams an American Adventure" (containing road stories, 330 still images & 19 short films and film clips) for the iPad is on sale in the iTunes Bookstore from 31 July 2013 - ISBN 978-0-9575498-1-4.

In early 2006 rumours circulated of a second series of Road Dreams being in production but these may have been a hoax. According to his website, Bristow is working on a new version of Road Dreams called Codachrome.

== Items and music ==
The following is a listing of the items and music tracks featured in each programme. The artist names and track titles are as listed at the end of each programme. The names in brackets are those of commercially available albums which contain the associated track. In many cases tracks many also be available on other albums. Some of the music used in Road Dreams does not appear to be available commercially.

The epilogue of each programme is the same and contains the following reading from Jack Kerouac's novel On the Road.

We passed Las Cruces, New Mexico, in the night and arrived in Arizona at dawn. I woke up from a deep sleep to find everybody sleeping like lambs and the car parked God knows where, because I couldn't see out the steamy windows. I got out of the car. We were in the mountains: there was a heaven of sunrise, cool purple airs, red mountainsides, emerald pastures in valleys, dew, and transmuting clouds of gold; ... It was time for me to drive on.

Programme One

Items:

- Preview
- Arrival in New York
- Travels in New England
- "Snowbird" journey to Florida and Georgia
- Epilogue

Music

- Leo Kottke - Machine #2 (on the Mudlark album)
- Rick Loveridge - Breakfast Special
- Keith Thompson - East Side Hum
- Rick Wakeman - Dandelion Airs
- Penguin Cafe Orchestra - No's 1-4 (on the Penguin Cafe Orchestra album)
- Rick Loveridge - Suitable Favours
- Richard W Gilks - Road Dreams Theme
- Rick Loveridge - Person To Person

Programme Two

Items:

- Preview: The Dakotas
- Culver, Kansas
- Running down to Alamosa
- Burma-Shave
- On to Las Vegas
- Epilogue

Music:

- Leo Kottke - Machine #2
- Rick Loveridge - Brimscombe
- Penguin Cafe Orchestra - Perpetuum Mobile
- Francois Godefroy - Dancers
- Rick Loveridge - Never Here Never Home
- Rick Loveridge - Leave A Message
- Leo Kottke - Pamela Brown (on the Ice Water album)
- Richard W Gilks - Road Dreams Theme
- Rick Loveridge - Person To Person

Programme Three

Items:

- Preview: Iowa
- Winter Driving
- Detroit to Washington DC
- Eastern suburbs and Jersey Shore
- Epilogue

Music:

- Leo Kottke - Machine #2
- Rick Loveridge - Root And Branch
- Keith Thompson - Slipping South
- Rick Loveridge - Brimscombe
- St Saens - Carnival Of The Animals - The Aquarium (widely available with performances by various orchestras)
- Rick Wakeman - Waterfalls (on the Standing Stones compilation album)
- Penguin Cafe Orchestra - White Mischief (on the Broadcasting From Home album)
- Keith Thompson - East Side Hum
- Richard W Gilks - Eastway
- Richard W Gilks - Road Dreams Theme
- Rick Loveridge - Person To Person

Programme Four

Items:

- Preview: Rhode Island
- Boston: Fall in New England
- Cross-country to Oregon
- Stonehenge
- Down to San Francisco
- Epilogue

Music:

- Leo Kottke - Machine #2
- Pat Metheny - Goin' Ahead (on the 80/81 album)
- Leo Kottke - Born To Be With You (on the Ice Water album)
- Rick Loveridge - Never Here Never Home
- Rick Loveridge - Leave A Message
- Rick Loveridge - Suitable Favours
- Richard W Gilks - Road Dreams Theme
- Rick Loveridge - Person To Person

Programme Five

Items:

- Preview: Los Angeles
- New York
- Cross-country Drive
- Los Angeles
- Epilogue

Music:

- Leo Kottke - Machine #2
- Francois Godefroy - Cactus Lunch
- Tom Waits - Frank's Wild Years (on the album Frank's Wild Years)
- Francois Godefroy - Dancers
- Pat Metheny Group - Cross The Heartland (on the American Garage album)
- Penguin Cafe Orchestra - Music For A Found Harmonium (on the Broadcasting From Home album)
- Richard W Gilks - Road Dreams Theme
- Rick Loveridge - Person To Person

Programme Six

Items:

- Preview
- Train ride to Oregon
- Leave L.A.
- Final Cross-country trip
- Long Island and leave
- Epilogue

Music:

- Leo Kottke - Machine #2
- Unknown Artist - Blue Valley Junction (the artist is uncredited in the programme but is almost certainly Bob Palladino)
- Rick Loveridge - Breakfast Special
- Simon Kitson - LA Freeway
- Philip Aaberg - Spring Creek (on the High Plains album)
- Rick Loveridge - Home in October
- Rick Loveridge - Suitable Favours
- Francois Godefroy - Tracy's Big Moment
- Richard W Gilks - Road Dreams Theme
- Rick Loveridge - Person to Person

An alternative version of the song "L.A. Freeway", sung by Roger Creager, is available commercially.

The track "Dandelion Dreams" appears on Rick Wakeman's "Country Airs" album. The name "Dandelion Airs" listed in Road Dreams may have been an error or possibly a working title.

According to some sources the artist name "Rick Loveridge" can also be spelt "Rik Loveridge". The spelling "Rick" is used in the captions in Road Dreams.

The track "Tracy's Big Moment" is written by the guitarist Adrian Legg. "Tracy's Big Moment" is on his 1990 album "Guitars & Other Cathedrals" and is an electric guitar version of the acoustic track used in Road Dreams. This version is played by François Godefroy.
