= Broadcasting from Home =

Studio album by Penguin Cafe Orchestra
- Released: 1984
- Recorded: 1982–1984
- Genres: Instrumental, avant-pop
- Length: 47:17
- Label: E.G.
- Producer: Simon Jeffes

Penguin Cafe Orchestra chronology
The Penguin Cafe Orchestra Mini Album (1983)	Broadcasting from Home (1984)	Signs of Life (1987)

Professional ratings
Review scores
Source	Rating
AllMusic	4.5/5 stars
Robert Christgau	B+

Broadcasting from Home is the third studio album by the Penguin Cafe Orchestra, released in 1984 on E.G. Records. The opening song was named after PCO leader Simon Jeffes found a discarded harmonium in an alleyway in Japan.

The original vinyl record was pressed by Polydor from a damaged master and had a distinctive click on the first track. Polydor wouldn't pay to restore this, and fans therefore had to wait until the CD's 2008 release by Virgin (which by then had bought the Editions EG catalogue) to hear the undamaged track.

== Track listing ==
All music composed by Simon Jeffes except as indicated

Side one

No.	Title	Writer(s)	Length
1.	"Music for a Found Harmonium"		3:34
2.	"Prelude and Yodel"		3:51
3.	"More Milk"	Jeffes, Geoffrey Richardson	3:05
4.	"Sheep Dip"	Jeffes, Richardson	3:57
5.	"White Mischief"		5:48
6.	"In The Back of a Taxi"		3:21

Side two

No.	Title	Writer(s)	Length
7.	"Music by Numbers"	Jeffes, Richardson	4:40
8.	"Another One from the Colonies"	Jeffes, Neil Rennie	3:04
9.	"Air"		4:20
10.	"Heartwind"	Jeffes, Ryuichi Sakamoto	4:10
11.	"Isle of View (Music for Helicopter Pilots)"		4:29
12.	"Now Nothing"		2:58

== Personnel ==
- Simon Jeffes -Harmonium, Cuatro, Guitar, Electric Guitar, Milk bottles, Triangle, Bass, Violin (4), Drum, Piano (5, 10, 12), Linn Drum Computer, Ukulele (8, 10), Metal Plate, Omnichord, Soloban, Spinet, Dulcitone, Penny Whistles (11)
- Marcus Beale - Electric Violin (9)
- Dave Defries - Trumpet, Flugelhorn
- Kuma Harada - Bass (1, 11)
- Fami - Drums (6)
- Michael Giles - Drums (11)
- Geoffrey Richardson - Viola, Shaker (3), Bass (10), Electric Guitar (10), Penny Whistle (10)
- Helen Liebmann - Cello
- Trevor Morais - Hi Hat, Wood Block, Cow Bell
- Steve Nye - Piano (6, 7, 11)
- Neil Rennie - Ukulele (6), Cuatro (8)
- Annie Whitehead - Trombone
- Gavyn Wright - Violin
