= Live: Canterbury Comes to London =

Canterbury Comes to London: Live from Astoria

Live album by Caravan
- Released: 20 April 1999
- Recorded: 17 September 1997
- Venue: The Astoria, London
- Genre: Progressive rock
- Length: 76:10
- Label: Transatlantic
- Producer: Julian Gordon Hastings

Caravan chronology
Ether Way (1998)	Canterbury Comes to London: Live from Astoria (1999)	Surprise Supplies (1999)

Professional ratings
Review scores
Source	Rating
AllMusic	3/5 stars

Canterbury Comes to London: Live from Astoria is a live album by the progressive rock band Caravan from 17 September 1997 at The Astoria, London, being released 20 April 1999.

== Track listing ==
1. "Memory Lain" (Pye Hastings) – 5:04
2. "Headloss" (Pye Hastings) – 4:53
3. "Nine Feet Underground" (Coughlan, Hastings, D. Sinclair, R. Sinclair) – 17:33
4. "The Dog, the Dog, He's at It Again" (Pye Hastings) – 6:28
5. "Cold as Ice" (Pye Hastings) – 5:47
6. "Somewhere in Your Heart" (Pye Hastings) – 5:39
7. "I Know Why You're Laughing" (Pye Hastings) – 5:47
8. "Liar" (Pye Hastings) – 6:42
9. "For Richard" (Coughlan, Hastings, D. Sinclair, R. Sinclair) – 11:04
10. "Golf Girl" (Coughlan, Hastings, D. Sinclair, R. Sinclair) – 7:08

== Personnel ==
Caravan

- Pye Hastings – vocals, guitar
- Doug Boyle – guitar
- Geoffrey Richardson – flute, mandolin, viola, spoons
- Dave Sinclair – keyboards
- Jim Leverton – bass, vocals
- Richard Coughlan – drums
- Simon Bentall – percussion
