= The Penguin Cafe Orchestra Mini Album =

EP by Penguin Cafe Orchestra
- Released: 1983
- Genre: Instrumental folk
- Length: 25:56
- Label: EG Records
- Producer: Simon Jeffes

Penguin Cafe Orchestra chronology
Penguin Cafe Orchestra (1981)	The Penguin Cafe Orchestra Mini Album (1983)	Broadcasting from Home (1984)

Professional ratings
Review scores
Source	Rating
Robert Christgau	B

The Penguin Cafe Orchestra Mini Album is an EP by Penguin Cafe Orchestra consisting of six pieces, two derived from previous released recordings ("The Penguin Cafe Single" and "Air a Danser"), two that were recorded from a live performance in Tokyo ("Numbers 1-4" and "Salty Bean Fumble"), and two previously unreleased pieces which had not appeared elsewhere ("The Toy" and "Piano Music"). The two live pieces were recorded by NHK Radio at the Kan-i Hoken Hall on 10 June 1982. "Piano Music" is a solo piece recorded by Simon Jeffes in Tokyo on 7 July 1982 and "The Toy" was recorded in 1983. The cover painting was by Emily Young.

== Track listing ==
All tracks composed by Simon Jeffes; except where indicated

1. "The Penguin Cafe Single" (Simon Jeffes, Helen Liebmann, Gavin Wright)
2. "Air a Danser"
3. "The Toy"
4. "Numbers 1-4"
5. "Salty Bean Fumble"
6. "Piano Music"
