= Kathryn Tickell =

English musician (born 1967)

Kathryn Tickell OBE, DL
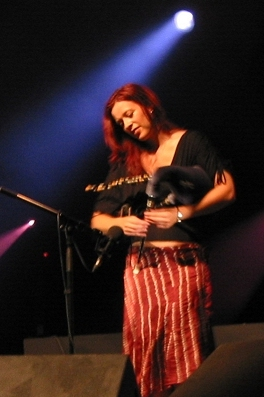
- Kathryn Tickell in Lorient, Brittany, 2004

Background information
- Born: 8 June 1967 (age 59); Walsall, Staffordshire, England
- Genres: Traditional, folk, Celtic
- Occupations: Musician, composer
- Instruments: Northumbrian smallpipes, fiddle
- Years active: 1984–present
- Labels: Black Crow, Park, Resilient
- Website: www.kathryntickell.com

Kathryn Tickell, OBE, DL (born 8 June 1967) is an English musician, noted for playing the Northumbrian smallpipes and fiddle.

== Music career ==
=== Early life ===
Kathryn Tickell was born in Walsall, to parents who originated from Northumberland and who moved back there from Staffordshire with the family when Kathryn was seven. Her paternal grandfather played accordion, fiddle, and organ. Her father, Mike Tickell, sings and her mother played the concertina. Her first instrument was piano when she was six. A year later, she picked up a set of Northumbrian smallpipes brought home by her father, who intended them for someone else. Frustrated by fiddle and piano, she learned that the pipes rewarded her effort. She was inspired by older musicians such as Willy Taylor, Will Atkinson, Joe Hutton, and Billy Pigg.

=== Performing and recording ===
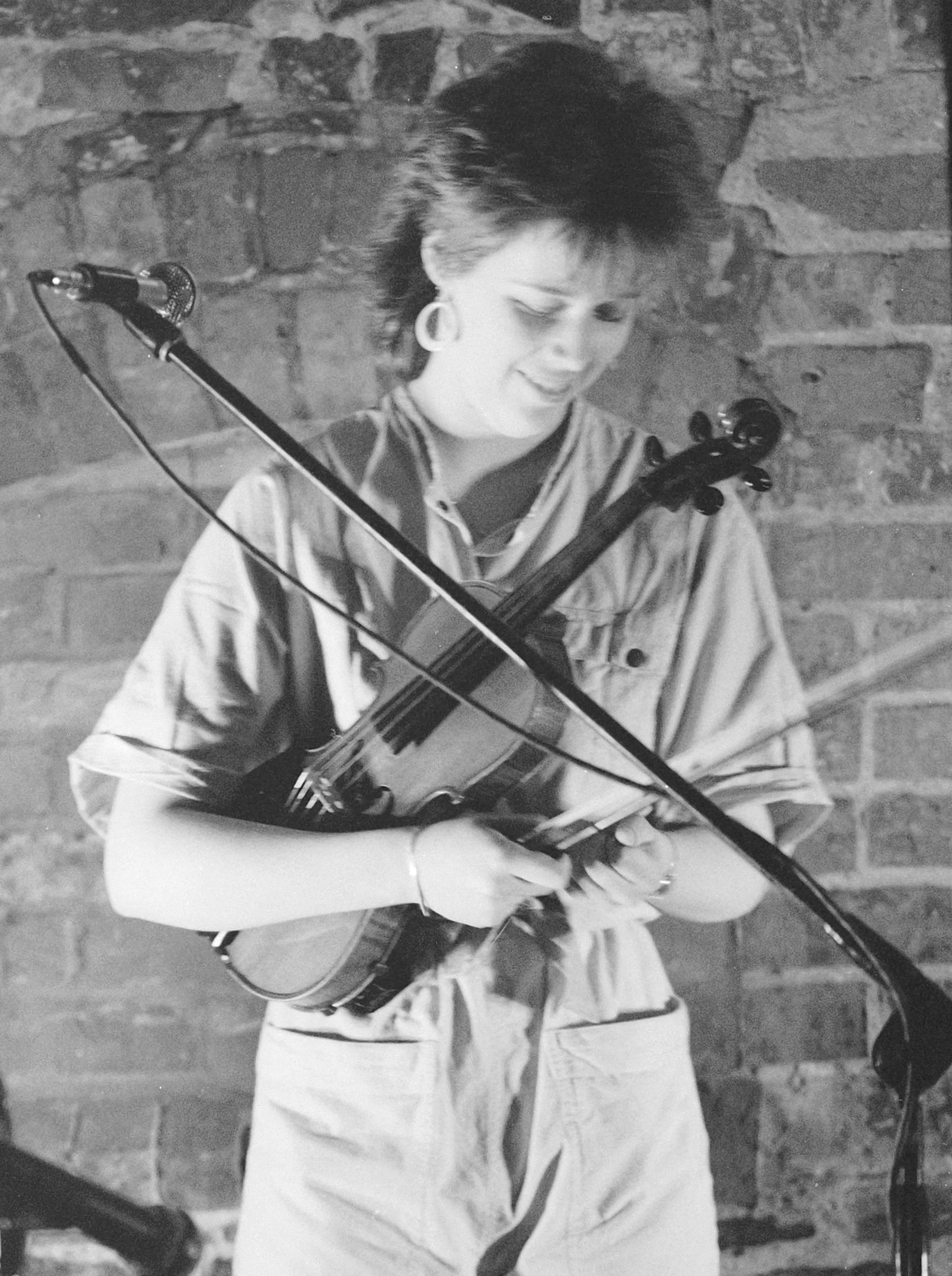
Tickell on stage in 1985, shortly after the release of her first recording

At thirteen, she had gained a reputation from performing in festivals and winning pipe contests. When she was seventeen, she released her first album, On Kielder Side (Saydisc, 1984), which she recorded at her parents' house. During the same year, she was named Official Piper to the Lord Mayor of Newcastle, an office that had been vacant for 13 years, since George Atkinson's appointment for a single year in 1971. She formed the Kathryn Tickell Band, with Karen Tweed on accordion, bass, and Ian Carr on guitar, and released the band's first album in 1991 on Black Crow Records. Later, the band comprised Peter Tickell on fiddle, Julian Sutton on melodeon, and Joss Clapp on guitar. In 2001, the Kathryn Tickell Band performed in a Proms in the Park concert in Gateshead that was linked up to the Last Night of the Proms, the first time traditional folk music had been featured at that event.

She recorded with the Penguin Cafe Orchestra, led by Simon Jeffes. She met Jeffes while she was in her teens, and he wrote the song "Organum" for her. Over a decade after Jeffes's death, she played with Penguin Cafe, run by his son, Arthur.

Tickell has also recorded with The Chieftains, The Boys of the Lough, Jon Lord, Jimmy Nail, Linda Thompson, Alan Parsons, and Andy Sheppard. She has performed live with Sting, and has recorded with him on his albums The Soul Cages (1991), Ten Summoner's Tales (1993), Mercury Falling (1996), Brand New Day, (1999), If on a Winter's Night... (2009), and The Last Ship (2013).

Two ex-members of the North East England traditional music group The High Level Ranters have appeared on her albums: Tom Gilfellon on On Kielder Side and Alistair Anderson on Borderlands (1986). The latter album included to a tribute to the Wark football team. Several other pipers have appeared on her albums: Troy Donockley on Debatable Lands, Patrick Molard on The Gathering and Martyn Bennett on Borderlands. Debatable Lands included "Our Kate", a composition by Kathryn Tickell dedicated to Catherine Cookson.

In 2011, she took part in the Sunderland A.F.C. charity Foundation of Light event.

She formed Kathryn Tickell and the Side, with Ruth Wall on Celtic harp, Louisa Tuck on cello, and Amy Thatcher on accordion. The group plays a mixture of traditional and classical music. They released an eponymous album in 2014.

In 2018 Tickell established a new band, Kathryn Tickell & The Darkening, with whom she released the album Hollowbone in 2019. This project signals a different approach, with new material. There is a semi-imaginary incursion into the prehistory of Northumbrian music in the track "Nemesis" based on Roman-era texts and a melody by Emperor Hadrian’s court musician Mesomedes. There is a foray into a world of ancestral shamanism in "O-u-t Spells Out". The album was greeted with critical acclaim, with four-star reviews in The Observer and the Financial Times, as were the band's various national tours in its first two years of existence.

=== Other projects ===
In 1987, the early part of her career was chronicled in The Long Tradition, a TV documentary. Kathryn Tickell's Northumbria, another documentary, appeared in 2006. In 1997, Tickell founded the Young Musicians Fund of the Tyne and Wear Foundation to provide money to young people in northeastern England who wanted to learn music. She founded the Festival of the North East and from 2009 to 2013 was the artistic director of Folkworks.

She is also a regular presenter for BBC Radio 3's weekly world music programme Music Planet.

== Awards and honours ==
- Official Piper for the Lord Mayor of Newcastle upon Tyne, 1984
- Musician of the Year, BBC Radio 2 Folk Awards, 2004, 2013
- The Queen's Medal for Music, 2009
- Best Traditional Album, Spiral Earth Awards, Northumbrian Voices
- Officer of the Order of the British Empire (OBE) Civil Division, 2015
- Honorary Degree, Open University, 2015
- Deputy Lieutenant (DL) for the County of Northumberland, 2015
- Honorary Degree (M.Mus), Durham University, 2017
- Honorary Degree (D.Mus), Newcastle University, 2019

== Discography ==
Kathryn Tickell

- On Kielder Side (Saydisc, 1984)
- Borderlands (Black Crow, 1987)
- Common Ground (Black Crow, 1988)
- The Gathering (Park, 1997)
- Debateable Lands (Park, 2000)
- Strange But True (2006)
- Northumbrian Voices (Park, 2012)

Kathryn Tickell & Corrina Hewat

- The Sky Didn't Fall (Park, 2006)

Kathryn Tickell & Ensemble Mystical

- Ensemble Mystical (Park, 2001)

Kathryn Tickell & Friends

- The Northumberland Collection (Park, 1998)
- Water of Tyne (Resilient, 2016)

Kathryn Tickell & Peter Tickell

- What We Do (Resilient, 2008)

Kathryn Tickell & The Darkening

- Hollowbone (Resilient, 2019)
- Cloud Horizons (Resilient, 2023)

Kathryn Tickell & the Side

- Kathryn Tickell & The Side (Resilient, 2014)

The Kathryn Tickell Band

- The Kathryn Tickell Band (Black Crow, 1991)
- Signs (Black Crow, 1993)
- Air Dancing (Park, 2004)
- Instrumental (Park, 2007)

With Sting

- 1991 The Soul Cages
- 1993 Ten Summoner's Tales
- 1996 Mercury Falling
- 1999 Brand New Day
- 2009 If on a Winter's Night
- 2013 The Last Ship

With others

- 1987 Wide Blue Yonder, Oysterband
- 1991 The Bells of Dublin, The Chieftains
- 1993 Union Café, Penguin Cafe Orchestra
- 1993 You Hold the Key, Beth Nielsen Chapman
- 1995 The Shouting End of Life, Oysterband
- 2000 Stamping Ground, Rod Clements
- 2001 "Music for a New Crossing", Andy Sheppard & Kathryn Tickell
- 2002 Fashionably Late, Linda Thompson
- 2003 25th Hour, Terence Blanchard
- 2003 Echo of Hooves, June Tabor
- 2006 Reunion, Daniel Lapp
- 2008 Durham Concerto, Jon Lord
- 2011 A Matter of Life, Penguin Cafe
- 2012 California 37, Train
- 2012 Seventeen Summers, Skinny Lister
- 2013 Wintersmith, Steeleye Span
- 2016 River Silver, Michel Benita
- 2019 Djesse Vol. 2, Jacob Collier
