= Still Life at the Penguin Cafe =

Ballet by David Bintley

Still Life at the Penguin Cafe is an ecocritical ballet choreographed by David Bintley and featuring music composed by Simon Jeffes, founder of the Penguin Cafe Orchestra. It is also the title of the accompanying album. Geoffrey Richardson co-wrote one of the pieces. The name of the ballet is derived from that of the Penguin Cafe Orchestra, which was Simon Jeffes' ensemble.

The ballet's debut production in 1988 was performed by The Royal Ballet at Covent Garden, in England. The ballet was conceived by David Bintley (at that time resident choreographer at Covent Garden), who approached Simon Jeffes about the music that was to be used in the choreography. The music for the ballet was drawn from several musical pieces composed by Jeffes before the ballet was conceived, composed during the period 1981 to 1987. Most of the pieces were originally written for small ensembles, consisting of, for example, violin, cello, guitar and piano. Jeffes orchestrated the pieces for the ballet, and in the Royal Ballet production, they were performed by a full orchestra. The ballet was filmed in 1988 by Thames Television and commercially released. The ballet premiered in the United States in 1991.

== Ballet story ==
The pieces / sections in the ballet are:

1. The Penguin Cafe (musical piece Air à Danser)
2. Utah Longhorn Ram (musical piece Prelude and Yodel)
3. Texan Kangaroo Rat (musical piece Long Distance, original title Horns of a Bull)
4. Humboldt's Hog Nosed Skunk Flea (musical piece Pythagoras's Trousers)
5. Southern Cape Zebra (SCZ) (musical piece White Mischief)
6. Rain Forest People (musical piece Now Nothing)
7. Brazilian Woolly Monkey (musical piece Music By Numbers)
8. Conclusion (musical piece Numbers 1–4)

== Story line ==
The ballet begins with a voice-over (by Jeremy Irons) describing how the great auk was very recently made extinct by man. The initial segment is set in a cafe, where several humans are served by penguins dressed as waiters. The humans watch a number of performances in which endangered species (or culture, in the cast of the Rain Forest People) dance. In the conclusion, all the characters withstand a downpour by gathering on an ark-like boat.

== Production Details ==
From the 1988 production:

- Performed by the Royal Ballet
- Composed by Simon Jeffes (Geoffrey Richardson co-composed "Brazilian Woolly Monkey" i.e. "Music by Numbers")
- Choreographed by David Bintley
- Designed by Hayden Griffin
- Music performed by The Orchestra of the Royal Opera House, Covent Garden
- Conducted by Isaiah Jackson
- Narrated by Jeremy Irons

=== Dancers ===
- Utah Longhorn Ram - Deborah Bull
- Ram Partner - Guy Niblett
- Texan Kangaroo Rat - Bruce Sansom
- Humboldt's Hog-nosed Skunk Flea - Fiona Brockway
- Southern Cape Zebra - Phillip Broomhead
- Rainforest People - Tracy Brown, Jonathan Cope, Michelle di Lorenzo
- Brazilian Woolly Monkey - Stephen Jefferies
- The Great Auk - Nicola Roberts

== Recordings and publications ==
- LaserDisc: London/Decca #071 222-1 (1991). See production details above for choreographer, etc. Out of print.
- Sheet music, arranged for piano by Henry Roche. Published by Peters Edition Ltd (London) 2002; ISBN 0-9542720-0-5. Still in print as of November 2007.
- VHS tape — Polygram Records; ASIN 630202367X, 1992. Out of print.
- DVD — Published by ArtHaus. ASIN: B000Y351ZC. In print since January 2008.

Both the LaserDisc and DVD contain a 50-minute documentary on the Penguin Cafe Orchestra.

=== Album ===
The music for the ballet was released as an album, under Jeffes' name, together with an 18-minute suite called Four Pieces for Orchestra, comprising orchestral recordings of earlier Penguin Cafe Orchestra tracks:

1. Perpetuum mobile
2. Southern Jukebox Music
3. Oscar Tango
4. Music for a Found Harmonium
- CD: Polygram records (1991) ASIN B00000E42T. BBC Concert Orchestra, conducted by Barry Wordsworth. Out of print but available as a digital download.
