= Ether Way =

Ether Way: BBC Sessions 1975-77

Live album by Caravan
- Released: 24 November 1998
- Recorded: 1975–1977
- Genre: Progressive rock
- Label: Hux

Caravan chronology
Songs for Oblivion Fishermen (1998)	Ether Way: BBC Sessions 1975-77 (1998)	Live: Canterbury Comes to London (1999)

Professional ratings
Review scores
Source	Rating
AllMusic	2.5/5.0 stars

Ether Way: BBC Sessions 1975-77 is a live album by the progressive rock band Caravan released 1998.

== Track listing ==
1. "The Show of Our Lives" (John Murphy, Dave Sinclair) – 4:54
2. "Stuck in a Hole" (Pye Hastings) – 3:15
3. "The Dabsong Conshirto" (John Murphy, Dave Sinclair) – 12:32
4. "All the Way" (Pye Hastings) – 6:33
5. "A Very Smelly Grubby Little Oik/Bobbing Wide/Come on Back/Grubby Oik" (Pye Hastings) – 11:44
6. "Behind You" (Pye Hastings) – 5:13
7. "The Last Unicorn" (Geoffrey Richardson) – 5:34
8. "Nightmare" (Pye Hastings) – 6:17
9. "Better by Far" (Pye Hastings) – 4:48
- 1 – 3 recorded for John Peel, 26.6.1975. First transmitted 3.7.1975
- 4 – 5 recorded for John Peel, 6.5.1976. First transmitted 17.5.1976
- 6 – 9 recorded for John Peel, 2.5.1977. First transmitted 10.5.1977

== Personnel ==
Caravan

- Pye Hastings – vocals, guitar, vocals, liner notes (all)
- Richard Coughlan – drums (all)
- Geoffrey Richardson – clarinet, flute, guitar, viola, spoons (all)
- Dave Sinclair – keyboards, vocals (1–3)
- Mike Wedgwood – bass, conga (1–5)
- Jan Schelhaas – keyboards (4, 5)
- Dek Messecar – bass (6–9)
