= All Over You Too =

All Over You...Too

Compilation album by Caravan
- Released: 20 June 2000
- Recorded: June 1999
- Genre: Progressive rock
- Length: 46:38
- Label: Castle

Caravan chronology
Surprise Supplies (1999)	All Over You...Too (2000)	Green Bottles for Marjorie: The Lost BBC Sessions (2002)

Professional ratings
Review scores
Source	Rating
AllMusic	2.5/5.0 stars

All Over You...Too is the second compilation album volume of the 1990s reformation of the progressive rock band Caravan released in 2000.

== Track listing ==
1. "Hoedown" (Pye Hastings) – 4:08
2. "A Very Smelly Grubby Little Oik" (Hastings) – 3:28
3. "Bobbing Wide" (Hastings) – 3:01
4. "The Dog, the Dog, He's at It Again [1999 version]" (Hastings) – 6:01
5. "Stuck in a Hole" [1999 version] (Hastings) – 3:57
6. "Ride" [1999 version] (Richard Coughlan, Hastings, Richard Sinclair, Dave Sinclair) – 7:27
7. "Nightmare" (Hastings) – 7:00
8. "C'thlu Thlu" (Hastings) – 7:03
9. "Bobbing Wide (Reprise)" (Hastings) – 4:22

== Personnel ==
- Pye Hastings – vocals, guitar, rhythm guitar, bass, harmony
- Doug Boyle – guitar
- Jimmy Hastings – woodwind
- Geoffrey Richardson – cello, viola
- Dave Sinclair – keyboards
- Hugh Hopper – bass, bass guitar
- Jim Leverton – bass, bass guitar
- Richard Coughlan – drums

== Release information ==
Year	Type	Label	Catalog #
1999	CD	HTD	102
2000	CD	Transatlantic	325
2000	CD	Castle	609
