= Green Bottles for Marjorie: The Lost BBC Sessions =

Live album by Caravan
- Released: 11 October 2002 and 28 December 2004
- Recorded: 31 December 1968; 16 May 1971; 11 April 1972
- Genre: Progressive rock
- Length: 61:44
- Label: Caravan

Caravan chronology
All Over You...Too (2000)	Green Bottles for Marjorie: The Lost BBC Sessions (2002)	Live at the Fairfield Halls, 1974 (2002)

Professional ratings
Review scores
Source	Rating
AllMusic	3.5/5.0 stars
DPRP	7.5/10 stars

Green Bottles for Marjorie: The Lost BBC Sessions is a live album by the progressive rock group Caravan, offering several early BBC Radio broadcast.

== Track listing ==
1. "Green Bottles for Marjorie"
2. "Place of My Own"
3. "Feeling, Reeling & Squealing"
4. "Ride"
5. "Nine Feet Underground"
6. "In the Land of Grey & Pink"
7. "Feeling, Reeling & Squealing"
8. "Love in Your Eye"
- Tracks 1–4: Top Gear session – Recorded 31.12.1968
- Tracks 5–7: Radio One in Concert – Recorded and first broadcast 16.5.1971
- Track 8: John Peel session – Recorded 11.4.1972
- Remastered and compiled at The Audio Archiving Company, London

== Personnel ==
- Pye Hastings – guitar, vocals
- David Sinclair – keyboards (tracks 1–7)
- Steve Miller – keyboards (track 8)
- Richard Sinclair – bass, vocals
- Richard Coughlan – drums
