= Live at the Fairfield Halls, 1974 =

Live album by Caravan
- Released: 2002
- Recorded: 1 September 1974
- Venue: Fairfield Halls in Croydon, London by the Pye Mobile Recording Unit
- Genre: Progressive rock, Canterbury scene
- Length: 79.54
- Label: Decca
- Producer: David Hitchcock

Caravan chronology
Green Bottles for Marjorie: The Lost BBC Sessions (2002)	Live at the Fairfield Halls, 1974 (2002)	The Unauthorized Breakfast Item (2003)

Professional ratings
Review scores
Source	Rating
AllMusic	4/5 stars

Live at the Fairfield Halls, 1974 is a live album by Caravan. It remained unreleased in the UK until 2002, though most of the set was issued as a double vinyl LP in France and Germany called The Best of Caravan "Live" in 1980. This issue is now very rare and was only available for 3 years. This live set happened to be the first time Mike Wedgwood had played bass for the band.

== Track listing ==
1. "Memory Lain, Hugh / Headloss" – 9:27
2. "Virgin on the Ridiculous" – 7:14
3. "Be Alright / Chance of a Lifetime" – 6:37
4. "The Love in Your Eye" – 15:23
5. "L'Auberge Du Sanglier / A Hunting We Shall Go / Pengola / Backwards / A Hunting We Shall Go (Reprise)" – 9:49
6. "The Dog the Dog He's at It Again" – 6:23
7. "For Richard" – 19:01
8. "Hoedown" – 5:58

== Personnel ==
Caravan

- Pye Hastings – guitar, lead vocals
- David Sinclair – Hammond organ, electric piano, synthesizer
- Geoffrey Richardson – viola
- Mike Wedgwood – bass, backing vocals
- Richard Coughlan – drums
