= Gavyn Wright =

British violinist

- Origin: England
- Occupations: Violinist; orchestra leader
- Instruments: Violin; viola
- Formerly of: London Session Orchestra, Penguin Cafe Orchestra

Gavyn Wright is a British violinist and orchestra leader with the London Session Orchestra and Penguin Cafe Orchestra.

He is best known for his orchestral arrangements on pop productions (including Elton John, Simply Red, Bush, Fito Páez, Gustavo Cerati, Mecano, Oasis, Gordon Haskell, Donna Lewis, Tina Turner, Italian singer-songwriter Alice, Lucio Battisti, Van Morrison) as well as numerous TV and movie soundtracks (including Shrek 1 and 2, The Constant Gardener, Stuart Little, Spider-Man, Thunderbirds, Batman Begins, The Black Dahlia, Shakespeare in Love, 12 Monkeys, The Last Emperor, We Were Soldiers, Shall We Dance?).

Wright's brother was the late actor Adrian Wright.

== Penguin Cafe Orchestra ==
In 1973, he joined Simon Jeffes project Penguin Cafe Orchestra, he worked on the first three albums of the orchestra, Music from the Penguin Cafe, Penguin Cafe Orchestra and Broadcasting From Home, after leaving the group in 1985.
