= Arthur Jeffes =

English composer and musician (born 1978)

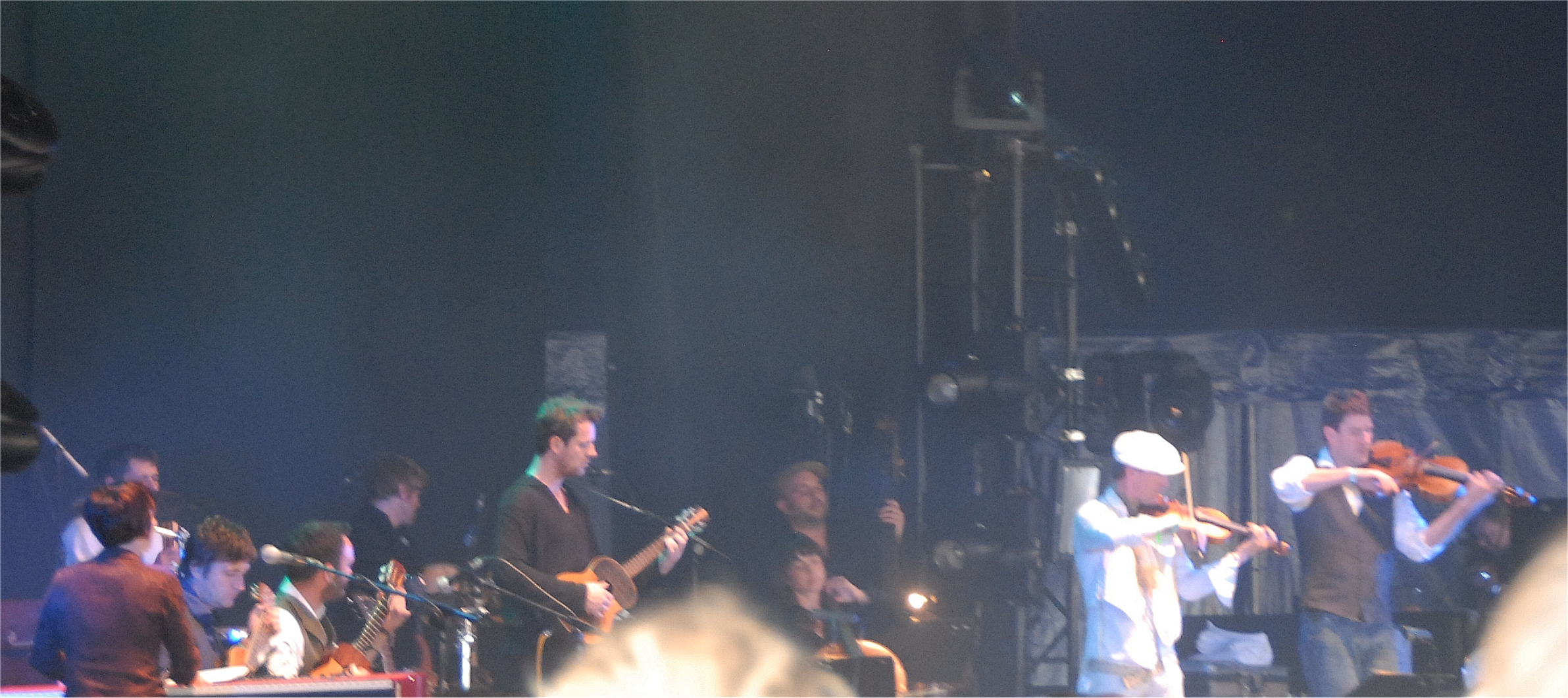
- Penguin Cafe performing in 2011

Background information
- Born: Arthur William Phoenix Young Jeffes; 21 July 1978 (age 48); Paddington, London, England
- Genres: Chamber jazz; folk
- Occupations: Musician; composer; explorer
- Member of: Penguin Cafe

Arthur William Phoenix Young Jeffes (born 21 July 1978) is an English composer, musician, and arctic explorer. He is the frontman of the musical group Penguin Cafe, which he formed in 2007 to play the music of his father's band, the Penguin Cafe Orchestra.

== Early life ==
Jeffes was born in London to the artist Emily Young and musician and composer Simon Jeffes. His interest in experimental music was recognised by his father when he took a hammer to the keys of a piano. He studied archaeology and anthropology at Trinity College, Cambridge.

== Penguin Cafe ==
In 2007, original members of Penguin Cafe Orchestra played a series of three memorial concerts, with Jeffes performing onstage with the band for the first time, to mark ten years since Simon Jeffes' death. Encouraged by the public response to the concerts, which all sold out, Jeffes decided that keeping his father's music alive was a worthwhile endeavour. He founded a new band, Penguin Cafe, with a lineup including Cass Browne, Neil Codling of Suede, Oli Langford, and Darren Berry. The band plays both music by Simon Jeffes and their own compositions.

== International Space Orchestra ==
In 2012, Jeffes was commissioned by the artist Nelly Ben Hayoun-Stépanian to write several pieces for the NASA Kepler space telescope mission, to be played by the International Space Orchestra. The pieces "1420" and "Aurora" were beamed into space in 2013. "1420" was inspired by the WOW! signal.

== Other work ==
Jeffes has also recorded music with pianist Mark Springer under the name Aparat.

== Discography ==
Penguin Cafe

- A Matter of Life... (2011)
- The Red Book (2014)
- The Imperfect Sea (2017)
- Handfuls of Night (2019)
- Rain Before Seven... (2023)

Aparat

- Aparat (2016)
