= John Cumbers =

British molecular biologist and founder of SynBioBeta

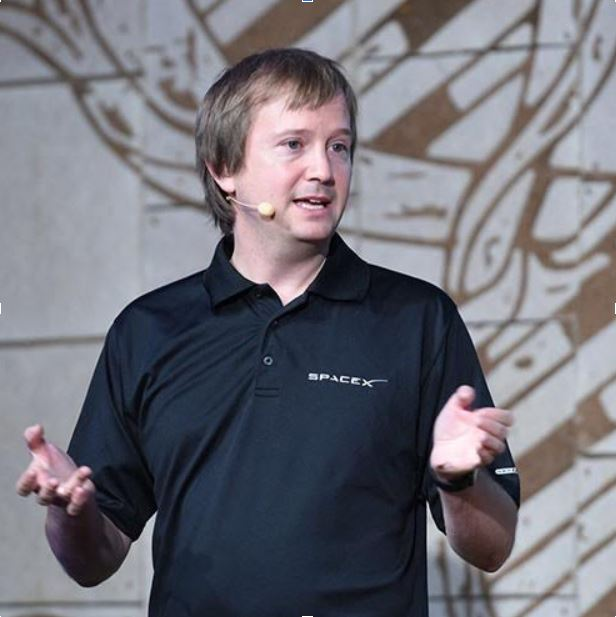
- Born: 1979 (age 46–47)
- Education: Brown University, University of Edinburgh, University of Hull
- Known for: synthetic biology, investing, biostrategy, space settlement
- Awards: National Academies Keck Futures Initiative in 2010
- Scientific career
- Fields: Molecular Biology, Cell Biology, Biochemistry, Synthetic Biology
- Workplaces: SynBioBeta, NASA

John Robert Cumbers (born 1979) is a British molecular biologist living in the San Francisco Bay Area. He is founder and chief executive officer of SynBioBeta which promotes synthetic biology to build a more sustainable universe. He founded BetaSpace, a space settlement innovation network aimed at sustaining human life on and off our planet and is an operating partner at DCVC, a firm in Silicon Valley focused on investments in biotechnology.

== Education and early life ==
John Cumbers was born on October 5, 1979, in Watford, Hertfordshire, Eastern England, 15 miles north-west of London. Since childhood, he showed a keen interest in biology and information technology. Cumbers attended Queens' School in Bushey, Hertfordshire for high school. In 2004, he obtained his BSc in Computer Science with Information Engineering at the University of Hull, a public research university in Kingston upon Hull, Yorkshire. For his master's in science and bioinformatics, he studied at the University of Edinburgh in Scotland. He obtained his PhD in molecular biology, Cell Biology and Biochemistry at Brown University, under the supervision of Lynn J. Rothschild at NASA Ames Research Center where they initiated a program in space synthetic biology for NASA.

== Career ==
After obtaining his doctorate, Cumbers served as lead for the Planetary Sustainability Initiative of the National Aeronautics and Space Administration (NASA), the US federal agency responsible for aerospace research, aeronautics and the civilian space program. Between 2008 and 2015, Cumbers worked at the NASA Ames Research Center as a student and then contractor bioengineer and co-organized the first workshop on the applications of synthetic biology for space exploration. He spent seven years in NASA's synthetic biology program, engineering organisms to provide food, fuel, medicine and other support materials for space missions as well as mission design for space resource utilization, terraforming asteroids and life support.

In 2012, Cumbers founded SynBioBeta, a network for biological engineers, innovators and entrepreneurs who use biology to build a better and more sustainable universe. SynBioBeta hosts the Global Synthetic Biology Summit in San Francisco, California, every October. The Summit showcases the developments in synthetic biology that are transforming how people fuel, heal and feed the world. In addition to the Summit, SynBioBeta hosts a podcast and weekly digest.

In 2018, Cumbers founded BetaSpace, an innovation ecosystem investigating an off-Earth planet future. BetaSpace is focused on the broad areas of food and agriculture; water and waste; energy; and habitat and materials.

In 2017, Cumbers joined the Silicon Valley investment firm Data Collective (DCVC), a venture capital fund that backs entrepreneurs applying deep tech to transform giant industries.

== Publications ==
Cumbers is the author, with Karl Schmieder, of What's Your Bio-Strategy? How to Prepare Your Business for Synthetic Biology

Cumbers has written on aging and insulin signalling, the characterization of biological parts, resource utilization on space missions, synthetic biology in space, extremophiles (cyanobacteria and tardigrades) and the impact of space resources on financial markets. He is a regular contributor to Forbes.com, writing on the impact of synthetic biology on manufacturing industries

== Awards and achievements ==
In 2010, Cumbers received the National Academies Keck Futures Initiative Award for his work in using synthetic biology in NASA's missions.
