= Otamatone =

Electronic musical synthesizer

Otamatone オタマトーン

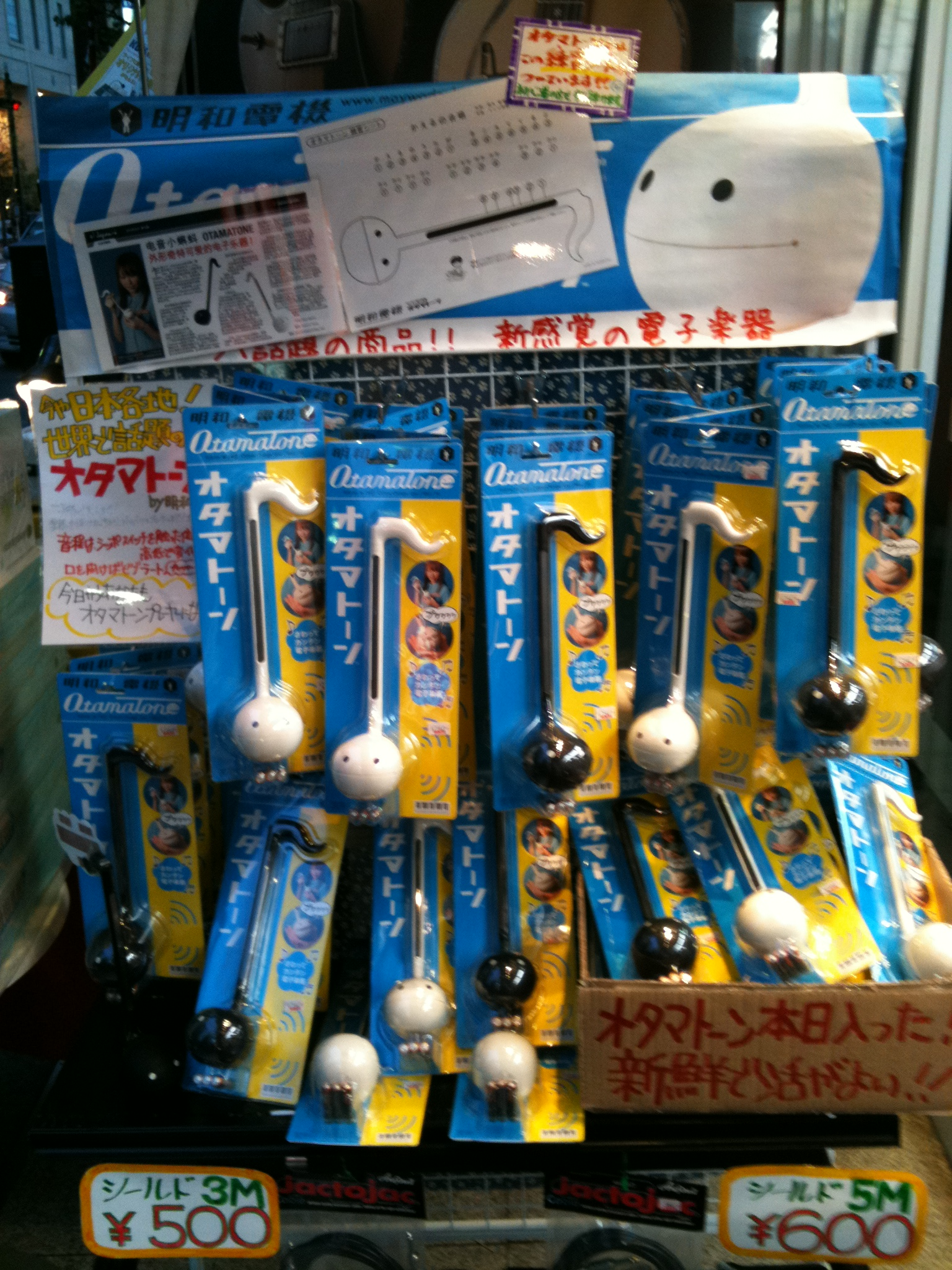
- Several Otamatones in a store
- Product type: Electronic musical synthesizer
- Current owner: Maywa Denki
- Country: Japan
- Introduced: 2009
- Website: https://otamatone.com

The Otamatone (Japanese: オタマトーン, Hepburn: Otamatōn) is an electronic musical synthesizer. Shaped like an eighth note, the ribbon controller on its stem is used to control pitch, while the notes produced by the synthesizer are played from the Otamatone's "head". It was developed in Japan by the CUBE Works toy company and the Maywa Denki design firm, led by the brothers Masamichi and Nobumichi Tosa, and is produced and marketed by Hamee.

== Description ==
The Otamatone is a synthesizer, the body of which is shaped like an eighth note (quaver) (it also somewhat resembles a tadpole, or a ladle, otamajakushi (お玉杓子 / おたまじゃくし) being Japanese for tadpole and ladle), with sound emerging from a "mouth" on the notehead. It requires two hands to play: while one hand holds and squeezes the "head", the other hand controls the pitch of the tune by placing the finger on a ribbon controller on the stem; a higher position on the stem creates a lower sound.

The ribbon controller is logarithmic to resemble a string instrument; there is a shorter distance between higher notes than between lower ones. Varying the pressure on the head (thereby opening and closing the "mouth" of the Otamatone) creates a wah-wah effect, and shaking the neck (and thereby slightly changing pressure on the head and ribbon) creates a vibrato effect. Switches on the back of the head allow users to change octave, turn it off or on, or change the volume.

A range of frequencies and a rendition of Greensleeves played on an Otamatone Deluxe.

The structure on top of the Otamatone's stem is called the tail.

The sound made by this instrument can be compared to the sound of a theremin or jinghu.

== History ==
The Otamatone was invented by Maywa Denki, a Japanese art and design group, in cooperation with CUBE Works. It was first introduced to the public in 2009, combining elements of electronic music and playful product design. While the instrument was initially marketed as a toy, it quickly became associated with experimental music and performance art.

In its early years, the Otamatone gained popularity within Japan, where its unusual appearance and humorous character appealed to a broad audience. The sliding-pitch design drew comparisons to the Theremin, though unlike the Theremin, the Otamatone required direct physical contact. These similarities helped spark curiosity among music enthusiasts who valued both its novelty and its creative potential.

By the mid-2010s, the Otamatone achieved international recognition through social media and video-sharing platforms such as YouTube. Viral performances and cover songs showcased its expressive range and comedic charm to global audiences.It became especially popular in internet culture, where memes and collaborative performances highlighted its quirky character. Over time, the instrument moved beyond its status as a novelty and became recognized as part of the broader category of electronic instruments.

== Design and structure ==
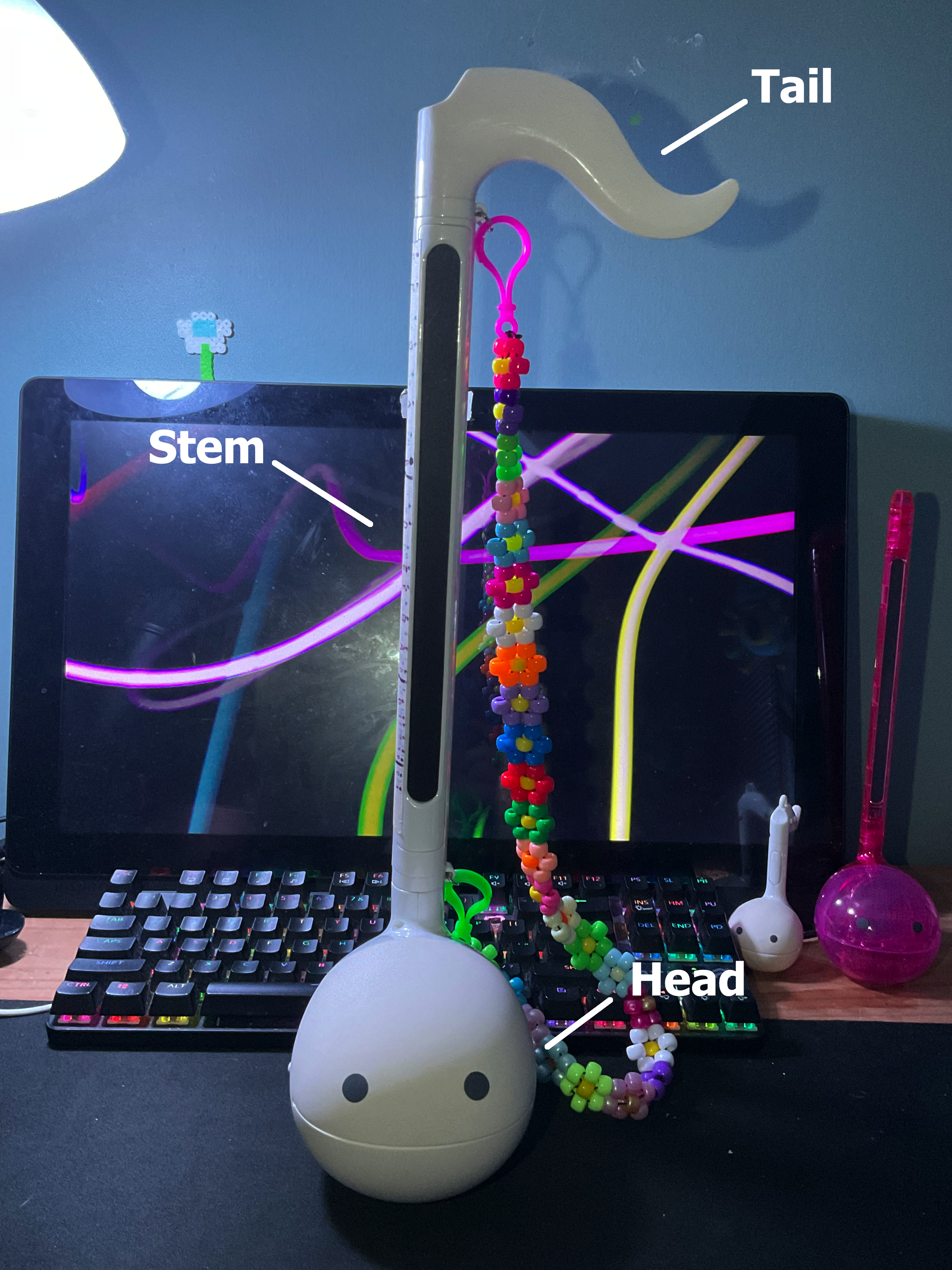
A simple diagram of an Otamatone (Deluxe shown, Standard and Melody are seen in the background.)

The Otamatone features a unique design that resembles a musical note. Its body is made of lightweight plastic, making it both durable and portable. The instrument consists of two main parts: a long stem and a round head. The stem functions as the sliding pitch controller, where the player touches and moves their fingers up and down to change the pitch and frequency of the sound.

The head of the Otamatone includes a squeezable mouth, which opens and closes to create a wah-like effect. Inside the head is a small electronic speaker that produces the instrument’s sound. The sliding pitch mechanism is similar to that of the Theremin, but unlike the Theremin, the Otamatone requires physical touch to control notes. Different versions of the instrument vary in size, tone quality, and features, with some models offering volume control, octave settings, or even digital connectivity. Overall, the Otamatone’s simple structure and playful design make it a distinctive and accessible electronic instrument for both beginners and experienced musicians.

== Playing technique ==
Playing the Otamatone involves both sliding pitch control and mouth movement to create expressive sounds. The player holds the stem with one hand and presses along the touch-sensitive strip to produce different pitches. Moving the finger up and down the stem changes the frequency. Lower positions on the touch-sensitive strip results in higher notes, while higher positions produce lower tones, which can be compared to fretless stringed instruments such as a violin or cello. This sliding motion allows for smooth pitch transitions similar to a Theremin or string instrument.

A C major scale and "Twinkle Twinkle Little Star" are played on an Otamatone Deluxe.

The other hand is used to squeeze the Otamatone’s mouth, opening and closing it to shape the sound. This motion acts like a filter or tone control, producing a characteristic “wah” effect. The combination of pitch sliding and mouth movement gives the instrument its distinctive voice-like quality. Some advanced models, such as the Otamatone Deluxe or Techno, allow players to connect to amplifiers or apps, adding effects like reverb, echo, or pitch correction. With practice, players can perform simple melodies or complex arrangements.

== Variations ==
=== Hamee models ===
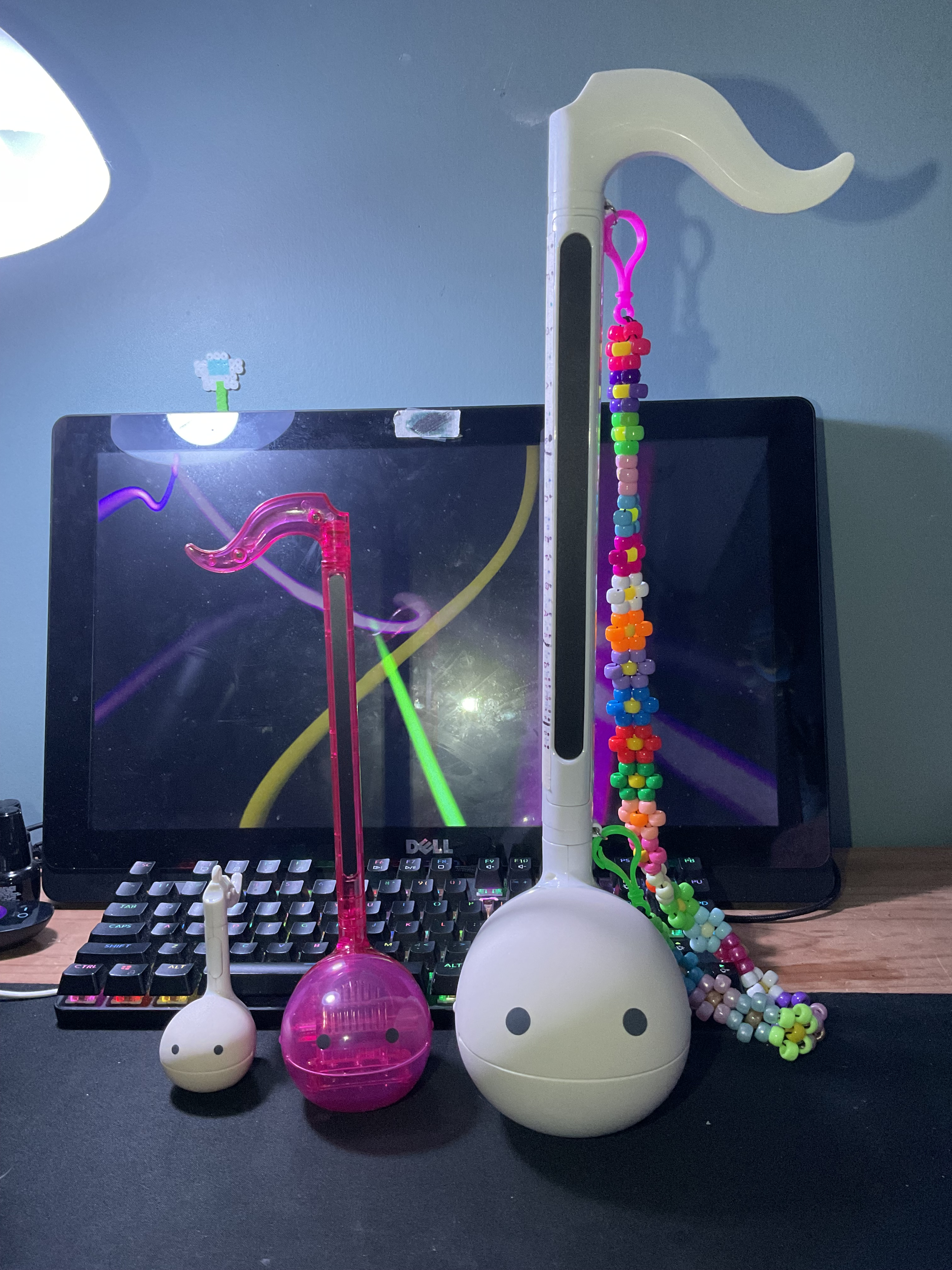
The three common Otamatone models usually sold by Hamee. From left to right: Melody, Standard, and Deluxe.

The Otamatone has various models. The three models produced and marketed by Hamee are:

- The Otamatone, or Otamatone Standard, the original model;
- The Otamatone Melody, a smaller Otamatone that can be held on a keychain, which replaces the ribbon controller with a single push-button and can only play a pre-programmed series of pitches in the tapped rhythm;
- The Otamatone Deluxe, a larger Otamatone with a longer ribbon controller which allows greater note precision and an output jack allowing an amplifier or effects to be connected.

Some Otamatones have designs based on popular Japanese characters, such as Kirby, Hello Kitty and Hatsune Miku. Kirby is the most popular, both as a video game character design and a Otamatone.

=== Maywadenki models ===
A number of models of Otamatone are produced only by Maywadenki themselves, either before the transfer of production to Hamee or otherwise not part of it. These are sold only in Japan:

- The Otamatone Digital, which replaces the ribbon controller with a small musical keyboard and supports multiple sounds on-board;
- The Otamatone Neo and Otamatone Techno, which resemble the Otamatone Standard and Otamatone Deluxe respectively but add an "OTM link" connector. This allows the Otamatone's onboard synthesis to be replaced by a smartphone app connected via an audio jack, thus allowing different voices and accompaniments to be played. Although the app remains available internationally, a wireless audio jack adapter would now be required.
- The Otamatone Jumbo, which has the feature set of the Otamatone Deluxe but is the length of a full-size guitar, intended to be played side-slung and incorporating a grip used to squeeze the head. Originally produced as a marketing device, it is now available for purchase internationally directly from Maywadenki, individually handmade at a price around US$2000.

== Comparison with similar instruments ==
Theremin

- Both the Otamatone and Theremin use continuous pitch control, allowing smooth changes in sound.
- The Theremin is played without physical contact, using hand movements near antennas.
- The Otamatone requires touch along its sliding stem to control pitch.
- The Otamatone includes a mouth-shaped speaker, adding visual expression to performance.
- The Theremin produces a pure electronic tone, while the Otamatone has a softer, voice-like sound.

Synthesizers

- Both generate sound through electronic oscillators that control pitch and frequency.
- Synthesizers offer advanced control through keyboards, knobs, and modulation options.
- The Otamatone simplifies sound control with a single ribbon controller and mouth filter.
- The Techno Otamatone model can connect to MIDI systems or smartphone apps, adding modern features.
- Synthesizers are used in professional music, while the Otamatone focuses on playful, simple performance.

Stylophone

- Both are compact electronic instruments known for their distinctive tones.
- The Stylophone uses a stylus to touch metal keys for each note.
- The Otamatone uses finger sliding on a touch strip for continuous pitch.
- The Stylophone offers precise note positions, while the Otamatone is more expressive and flexible.

Toy instruments

- The Otamatone is made of plastic and often seen as a toy instrument.
- It is affordable, portable, and designed for fun and learning.
- Unlike most toy instruments, it allows accurate pitch control and expressive sound effects.
- It bridges the gap between a musical toy and a true electronic instrument.
- Its simple design and unique voice-like tone make it popular among children and musicians alike.

== Reception ==
The instrument has gained significant popularity online, especially on YouTube and TikTok. It is often used to create cover songs, with channels such as TheRealSullyG and mklachu gaining popularity primarily from the use of the instrument. The Otamatone has also been used by musicians such as the Swedish heavy-metal guitarist Ola Englund.

On February 3, 2021, Juanjo Monserrat performed "Nessun Dorma" on the original Otamatone on the auditions for the sixth season of Got Talent España and won the Golden Buzzer award after two of the judges tried playing the instrument themselves.
