= Roger Chase =

British violist

Roger Chase (born in London in 1953) is a British violist who currently teaches at the Chicago College of Performing Arts at Roosevelt University.

== Life ==
Roger Chase was born in London and studied under Bernard Shore (with occasional lessons from Lionel Tertis) during his studies at the Royal College of Music from 1964 to 1974. He received his ARCM degree [associate honors diploma] in 1974, one year prior to Tertis's death. He is the current owner of the 1717 Montagnana viola, which is the instrument that Tertis used during the height of his performing career, originally acquired in Paris when it was in pieces. This 17 1/8" instrument was the inspiration for his developing, after his retirement, the Tertis model viola. His hope was to create an instrument more manageable by those with smaller hands, yet with the same deep sonority of his Montagnana. The 1717 Montagnana was acquired by Bernard Shore during Tertis's retirement in 1937 and upon Bernard Shore's death, was passed down to Chase.

Chase made his debut performance in 1979 with the English Chamber Orchestra. Since then, he has played as a soloist or chamber musician in major cities in the UK, US, Canada, Australia, Japan, India, and all of Western Europe. He has played as guest principal violist with every major British orchestra and many others in Europe and North America, including the Berlin Philharmonic. He served as the principal violist of the London Sinfonietta for 10 years, performed and recorded with the Nash Ensemble for over 20 years, the period instrument ensemble Hausmusik of London for 12 years, as well as recording and touring with the Esterhazy Baryton Trio (which has performed the Haydn oeuvre for baryton) and numerous other ensembles.

Chase has recorded for EMI, CRD, Hyperion, Cala, Virgin, and Floating Earth Records. He has taught at the Royal College of Music, the Guildhall School, the Royal Northern College of Music in Manchester, the Académie Internationale des Music de Chambre in the Netherlands, and Oberlin College.

Viola concertos have been written for Chase by Richard Harvey, Jonathan Lloyd, and Francis Holmes.
