= Jacob Cohen (scientist) =

NASA scientist

- Occupation: Scientist

Jacob Cohen is a scientist at NASA Ames Research Center. He is Chief Scientist for the International Space Station (ISS) Utilization Office, the Deputy Division Chief (Acting) for the Mission Design Division and the Director of the Ames Biology Office within the Engineering Directorate at the Ames Research Center. He is also responsible for implementing new biology-based opportunities.

Cohen also works with the Mission Development Division, the NanoSatellite Mission Office, and other directorates and divisions to develop small spacecraft utilization and application strategies. As part of his interest in the utilization of space for international, commercial and educational advancements, Cohen leads and coordinates the development of international collaboration opportunities in the Small Spacecraft Class of vehicles and the development of commercial and educational biology, ISS and small spacecraft opportunities.

Cohen received a Ph.D. from New York University in the area of molecular evolution. He then completed a postdoctoral fellowship at Cedars-Sinai Medical Center’s Ophthalmology Research Laboratories in the area of viral host relationships.

Cohen has been a guest speaker on TEDx; and has given a talk on "Evolution to Space" at TEDxSugarLand.
