= Penguin Cafe Orchestra =

English avant-pop band

Background information
- Origin: England
- Genre: Avant-rock
- Years active: 1972–1997 (Reunion: 2007)
- Labels: Obscure; E.G.; Virgin; EMI
- Website: penguincafe.com

The Penguin Cafe Orchestra (PCO) was an avant-rock band led by English guitarist Simon Jeffes. Co-founded with cellist Helen Liebmann, the band toured extensively during the 1980s and 1990s. The band's sound is not easily categorized, having elements of exuberant folk music and a minimalist aesthetic occasionally reminiscent of composers such as Philip Glass.

The group recorded and performed for 24 years until Jeffes died of an inoperable brain tumour in 1997. Several members of the original group reunited for three concerts in 2007. Since then, five original members have continued to play concerts of PCO's music, initially as the Anteaters, then as the Orchestra That Fell to Earth. In 2009, Jeffes' son Arthur founded a successor band simply called Penguin Cafe. Although it includes no original PCO members, the band features many PCO pieces in its live repertoire, and records and performs new music written by Arthur.

== History ==
After becoming disillusioned with the rigid structures of classical music and the limitations of rock, in which he also dabbled, Simon Jeffes became interested in the relative freedom in folk music and decided to imbue his work with the same immediacy and spirit.

Describing how the idea of the Penguin Cafe Orchestra came to him, Jeffes said:

In 1972 I was in the south of France. I had eaten some bad fish and was in consequence rather ill. As I lay in bed I had a strange recurring vision, there, before me, was a concrete building like a hotel or council block. I could see into the rooms, each of which was continually scanned by an electronic eye. In the rooms were people, everyone of them preoccupied. In one room a person was looking into a mirror and in another a couple were making love but lovelessly, in a third a composer was listening to music through earphones. Around him there were banks of electronic equipment. But all was silence. Like everyone in his place he had been neutralized, made grey and anonymous. The scene was for me one of ordered desolation. It was as if I were looking into a place which had no heart. Next day when I felt better, I was on the beach sunbathing and suddenly a poem popped into my head. It started out 'I am the proprietor of the Penguin Cafe, I will tell you things at random' and it went on about how the quality of randomness, spontaneity, surprise, unexpectedness and irrationality in our lives is a very precious thing. And if you suppress that to have a nice orderly life, you kill off what's most important. Whereas in the Penguin Cafe your unconscious can just be. It's acceptable there, and that's how everybody is. There is an acceptance there that has to do with living the present with no fear in ourselves.

The group's debut album, Music from the Penguin Cafe, recorded from 1974 to 1976, was released in 1976 on Brian Eno's experimental Obscure Records label, an offshoot of the EG label. It was followed in 1981 by Penguin Cafe Orchestra, after which the band settled into a more regular release schedule. The next three albums were Broadcasting From Home (1984), Signs of Life (1987) and Union Cafe (1993).

The band gave its first major concert on 10 October 1976, supporting Kraftwerk at The Roundhouse. They went on to tour the world and play at a variety of music festivals as well as residencies on the South Bank in London. From 1976 to 1996 they played in the US, Canada, Australia, Japan, and throughout Europe and the UK. In March 1987, they were the subject of an episode of the ITV arts series The South Bank Show, where they performed "Air", "Bean Fields", "Dirt" and "Giles Farnaby's Dream".

== Evolution ==
Simon Jeffes experimented with various configurations live and in the studio, including an occasional 'dance orchestra' and a quintet of strings, oboe, trombone and himself on piano. On the studio albums, he sometimes played several instruments, and brought in other musicians according to the needs of each piece.

There were a number of incarnations of the live band. Original members Gavyn Wright and Steve Nye left in 1984 and 1988 respectively. Bob Loveday replaced Gavyn Wright on violin. Gradually a regular lineup evolved around:

- Jeffes and Helen Liebmann (violoncello)
- Gavyn Wright (violin, pizzicato)
- Neil Rennie (ukulele), who joined in 1975
- Geoffrey Richardson (viola, cuatro, guitar, clarinet, mandolin, ukulele), who had joined in 1976 and co-wrote three pieces on Broadcasting from Home (1984)
- Julio Segovia (percussion), who answered an advert in Melody Maker and joined in 1978 on percussion
- Paul Street (guitar, cuatro, ukulele), who joined in 1984 and left in 1988
- Jennifer Maidman (percussion, bass, ukulele, cuatro), who joined in 1984
- Steve Fletcher (piano, keyboards) who replaced Steve Nye in 1988
- Annie Whitehead (trombone), who had appeared on Broadcasting from Home (1984) and joined the live band in 1988
- Peter McGowan (violin), succeeding Bob Loveday
- Barbara Bolte (oboe)

Doug Beveridge also became a regular fixture at the live mixing desk. The album Concert Program (1995) is the definitive recording of this lineup, and includes many of the group's best-known pieces.

== Later bands ==
After Simon Jeffes' death in 1997, the band's members continued to meet occasionally, but there were no new recordings or public appearances for over ten years. The band briefly reformed in 2007, with the lineup as featured on Concert Program (minus Julio Segovia), with Jennifer Maidman now handling Simon's guitar parts. The original members, joined onstage by Simon Jeffes's son Arthur on percussion and additional keyboards, played three sold-out shows at the Union Chapel in London.

After those concerts, Arthur Jeffes wanted to form a new group without any of the original PCO members. He called it "Music from the Penguin Cafe", later shortened to simply Penguin Cafe. The all-new ensemble, sometimes inaccurately billed as The Penguin Cafe Orchestra, played at a number of festivals in 2009, combining Penguin Cafe numbers with new pieces. In 2010, they appeared at the BBC Proms (with Northumbrian piper Kathryn Tickell).

With the Penguin Cafe name now being used by Arthur, the original PCO members who wanted to continue playing their music needed an alternative name. Four of them, multi-instrumentalists Geoffrey Richardson and Jennifer Maidman, trombonist Annie Whitehead, and pianist Steve Fletcher, have since played some festivals as The Anteaters. They have been joined by percussionist Liam Genockey, former member of Ian Gillan’s post Deep Purple project the Ian Gillan Band and well known as a member of Steeleye Span, and who played live with the Penguins in Italy in the 1980s. The name 'Anteaters' came from an incident on the 1983 PCO tour of Japan when Simon Jeffes discovered there was a craze for penguins in the country. He joked that, if the fashion changed, the orchestra would have to change its name to 'The Anteater Cafe Orchestra'. In October 2011, the same lineup appeared at the Canterbury Festival in Kent, UK, performing two hours of original PCO music as The Orchestra That Fell To Earth. They have continued to perform under that name.

In 2014 Simon Jeffes' son Arthur Jeffes recorded an album with the ensemble, calling themselves Penguin Cafe.

== Notable pieces ==
=== Telephone and Rubber Band ===
The Penguin Cafe Orchestra's most famous piece may be "Telephone and Rubber Band", which is based around a tape loop of a UK telephone ring tone intersected with a reorder tone, accompanied by the twanging of a rubber band. It is featured on the soundtracks of Nadia Tass's film comedy Malcolm (1986) and Oliver Stone's film Talk Radio (1988), in the Argentine TV show Caloi en su tinta (1990) and in a long-running advertising campaign for the telecoms company One2One (now EE). The 1996 single "In the Meantime" by New York City-based English rockers Spacehog featured a tweaked and detuned sample of "Telephone and Rubber Band". It was also the trademark song of Caloi en su tinta, an Argentinean TV show about artistic animation. The tape loop was recorded when Jeffes was making a phone call and discovered he was hearing a combination of a ring tone and an engaged signal due to a fault in the system. He recorded it on an answering machine.

=== Music for a Found Harmonium ===
Another famous tune featured in Malcolm (among other films) is "Music for a Found Harmonium", which Jeffes wrote on a harmonium he had found in a back street in Kyoto, where he was staying in the summer of 1982 after the ensemble's first tour of Japan. He wrote that after installing the found harmonium "in a friend's house in one of the most beautiful parts at the edge of the city," he "frequently visited this instrument during the next few months, and I remember the time fondly as one during which I was under a form of enchantment with the place and the time." "Music for a Found Harmonium" was used in the trailer for, and over the end credits of, the 1988 John Hughes movie She's Having a Baby. In the credits, many film actors and celebrities of the time invent their favourite name for an imagined child. (It was not included in the soundtrack released from the movie.)

"Music for a Found Harmonium" gained exposure when it was released on the first Café del Mar volume in 1994. Because its rhythm, tempo and simple structure made it suitable for adaptation as a reel, it was subsequently recorded by many Irish traditional musicians, including Patrick Street, De Dannan, Kevin Burke and Sharon Shannon. An Irish traditional version was used on the soundtrack of the film Hear My Song, made in Ireland in the early 1990s. In 2004, Patrick Street's cover of "Music for a Found Harmonium" was featured in the film Napoleon Dynamite, and the following year in the film It's All Gone Pete Tong. The Scottish folk rock band Rock Salt and Nails, from Shetland, also recorded a version of the song for their debut album Waves in 1993. The piece is also featured in the 2016 film, The Founder.

=== Still Life at the Penguin Cafe ===
Simon Jeffes composed music for the ballet Still Life at the Penguin Cafe, largely based on earlier compositions for the Penguin Cafe Orchestra. (Geoffrey Richardson co-wrote one of the pieces.) The ballet was first performed by the Royal Ballet in 1988, and the music was released as an album under Jeffes' name.

Film

The music to the 1986 Australian film Malcolm, was composed by Simon Jeffes and performed by PCO.

=== Perpetuum Mobile ===
Another of the group's well-known pieces is "Perpetuum Mobile" from their 1987 album Signs of Life. It has been used in several films, television and radio programmes, including as the main theme of the Australian stop-motion animated film Mary and Max (2009), and in the television adaptation of The Handmaid's Tale. Swedish DJ Avicii sampled the main melody for his song "Fade into Darkness". "Fade into Darkness" was in turn sampled on Leona Lewis's song "Collide". Because it was written in the 15/8 time signature, the melody seems to end and repeat one beat sooner than expected, giving it the feel of a perpetual motion device.

=== Numbers 1-4 ===
Another piece called "Numbers 1-4" was featured in a dance film shown on Mister Rogers' Neighborhood episode 1604, when Mr. McFeely brings the video in to show. The film featured dancers from Pittsburgh's Dance Alloy, who used fitness balls in the dance.

A number of pieces including "Numbers 1-4", "Perpetuum Mobile" and "Music for A Found Harmonium" were included on the soundtrack of the Channel 4 documentary series Road Dreams.

== Personnel ==
- Simon Jeffes – acoustic guitar, electric guitar, piano, cuatro, ukulele, bass, voice, Omnichord, Dulcitone, penny whistle, pitch pipes, harmonium, shakers, drums, ring modulator, rubber band, electronic organ, milkbottles, triangle, violin, drum, Linn Drum computer, soroban, spinet, Prophet V, fretless guitar, Bluthner and Bosendorfer pianos, zebra drum, tape, pianica, mandolin, electric aeolian harp
- Helen Liebmann – cello
- Steve Nye – electric piano, cuatro, Bluthner piano, Wurlitzer piano, harmonium
- Gavyn Wright – violin
- Geoffrey Richardson – viola, slide guitar, bass, bongos, metal frame, ukulele, mandolin, electric guitar, penny whistle, clarinet
- Jennifer Maidman – percussion, bass guitar, ukulele, cuatro, electric guitar, zebra drum.
- Emily Young – vocals
- Michael Giles – drums
- Dave DeFries – trumpet, fluegelhorn
- Annie Whitehead – trombone
- Nigel Kennedy – violin
- Naná Vasconcelos – clay pot, twigs
- Kathryn Tickell – Northumbrian small pipes
- Chris Laurence – bass
- Wilfred Gibson – violin
- Roger Chase – viola
- Braco – drums
- Marcus Beale – violin
- Kuma Harada – bass
- Barbara Bolte – oboe
- Stephen Fletcher – piano
- Peter McGowan – violin
- Giles Leaman – woodwinds
- Bob Loveday – violin
- Neil Rennie – ukulele
- Julio Segovia – percussion
- Jill Streater – oboe
- Peter Veitch – accordion
- Fami – drums
- Trevor Morais – drums
- Danny Cummings – percussion
- Paul Street – guitar
- Elisabeth Perry

== Discography ==
=== Studio albums ===
- Music from the Penguin Cafe (1976) OBSCURE 7, later EGED27
- Penguin Cafe Orchestra (1981) EGED11
- Broadcasting from Home (1984) EGED 38
- Signs of Life (1987) EGED 50 – UK No. 49
- Union Cafe (1993) ZOPFD 001

=== Extended play ===
- The Penguin Cafe Orchestra Mini Album (1983) EGMLP 2 – Six-song mini-LP consisting of 2 previously released tracks, 2 live tracks, and 2 new compositions.

=== Live albums ===
- When in Rome... (1988) EGED56
- Concert Program (1995) ZOPFD 002

=== Collections ===
- Preludes, Airs & Yodels (A Penguin Cafe Primer) (1996)
- A Brief History (2001) CDV 2954
- History (2001) Virgin Records LCO 3098
- The Second Penguin Cafe Orchestra Sampler (2004)

=== Simon Jeffes albums ===
- 'Still Life' at the Penguin Cafe (1990) DECCA 425 218-2
- Piano Music (2000) ZOPFD 003 – Solo pieces, collected after Jeffes' death.

=== Related album ===
- Arcane (1994), credited to 'Assorted Artists'

Arcane consists of recordings by diverse musicians brought together in August 1992 at the Real World studios in Wiltshire for a week of spontaneous collaborations and performances. No one musician appears on every track, but Jeffes is one of the more constant presences on this album and it includes new versions of previous PCO tracks "Yodel 3" and "Cage Dead". Amongst the many other collaborators are Billy Cobham, Andy Sheppard, Jane Siberry, Ayub Ogada, Nigel Kennedy, and Nana Vasconcelos.

=== Soundtracks ===
- Nightshift (1981) ("Cutting Branches for a Temporary Shelter")
- Malcolm (1986) ("Music For A Found Harmonium," "Paul's Dance," "Yodel 1," "Yodel 2," "Telephone And Rubber Band," "The Ecstasy Of Dancing Fleas")
- Talk Radio trailer (1988) ("Telephone and Rubber Band")
- Oskar und Leni (1999) (soundtrack was released on CD, containing 10 songs from Union Cafe and Concert Program)
- Chuck and Buck (2000) ("Air a Danser," "Paul's Dance," "Prelude and Yodel," "Nothing Really Blue")
- Slim Susie (2003) ("Perpetuum Mobile")
- The Good Girl (2002) ("Air" and "Steady State")
- The Princess and the Warrior official soundtrack (2000) ("Nothing Really Blue")
- Napoleon Dynamite official soundtrack (2005) ("Music for a Found Harmonium")
- It's All Gone Pete Tong official soundtrack (2005) ("Music for a Found Harmonium")
- Hewlett-Packard commercial (2006) ("Perpetuum Mobile")
- 3 lbs episode "Lost for Words" (2006) ("Perpetuum Mobile")
- Year of the Dog (2007) ("Music for a Found Harmonium")
- All the Little Animals music written by Simon Jeffes, performed and recorded by PCO members Geoffrey Richardson, Jennifer Maidman and Steve Fletcher
- Capitalism: A Love Story (2009) ("Music for a Found Harmonium")
- Mary and Max (2009) ("Perpetuum Mobile", "Prelude and Yodel")
- Origin Energy "Sustainability Drive" commercial ("Perpetuum Mobile")
- The Founder (2016) ("Music for a Found Harmonium")
- The Handmaid's Tale (2017) ("Perpetuum Mobile")
- It's a Sin (2020) ("Telephone and Rubber Band")
