= Geoffrey Richardson (musician) =

British musician

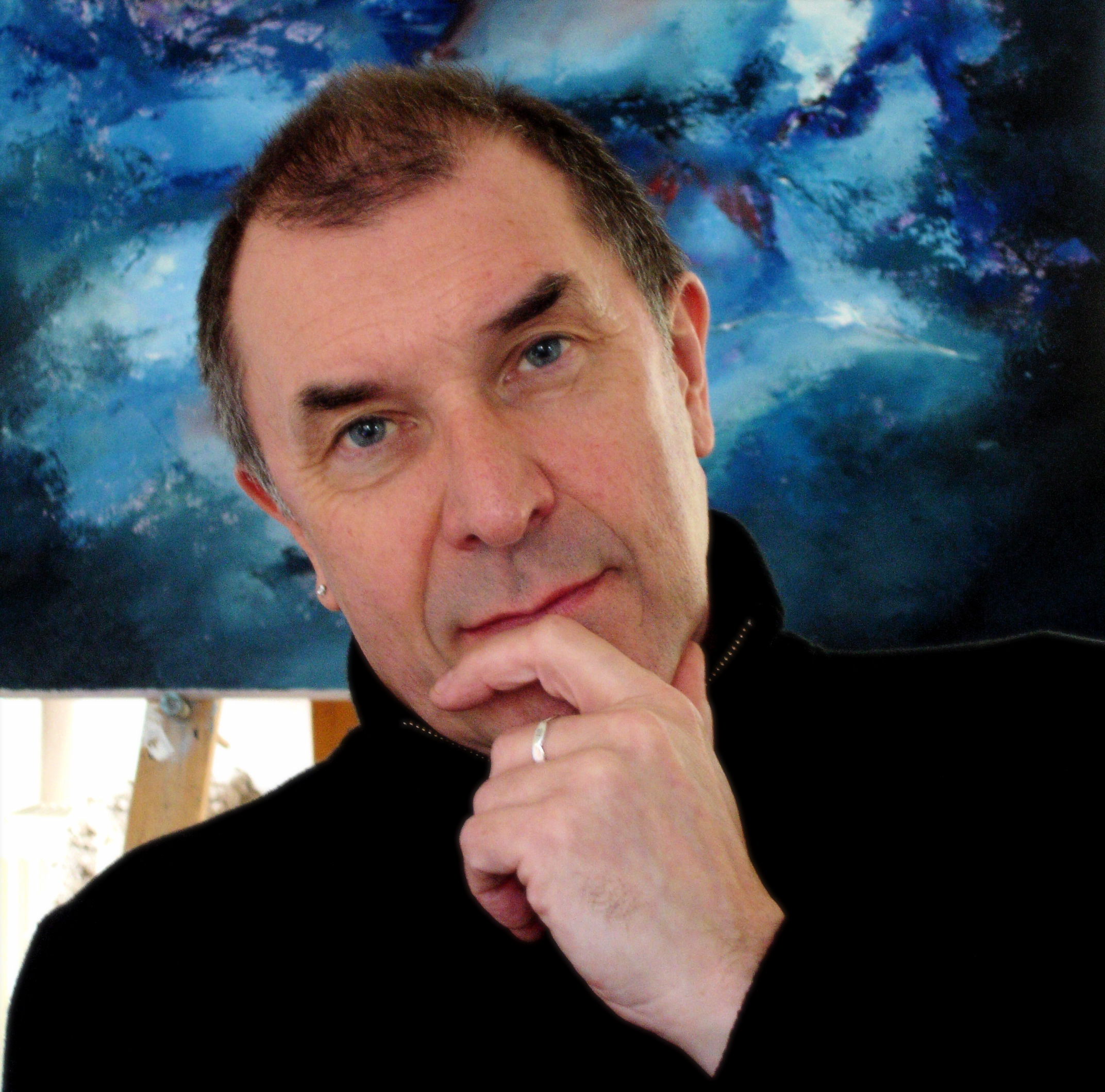

Background information
- Born: Peter Geoffrey Richardson; 15 July 1950 (age 76)
- Origin: Hinckley, Leicestershire, England
- Genres: Progressive rock; acoustic music
- Occupations: Musician; composer
- Instruments: Viola; violin; guitar; flute
- Years active: 1971–present
- Member of: Caravan
- Formerly of: Penguin Cafe Orchestra
- Website: geoffreyrichardson.com

Peter Geoffrey Richardson (born 15 July 1950), is a British viola player and multi-instrumentalist best known for his work with Caravan, Murray Head and the Penguin Cafe Orchestra.

== Career ==
Richardson's father was a semi-pro musician. Richardson himself studied at Winchester School of Art. He joined the Attack in 1967, playing guitar and writing on their album Magic in the Air, and left shortly after. Richardson then joined Spirogyra in 1972, but the band broke up shortly after and he joined Caravan on viola. In the mid-1970s, he diversified into session work, including with Kevin Ayers, Café Jacques, Penguin Cafe Orchestra, and The Buzzcocks. He left Caravan in 1978, but returned in 1980, playing on The Album.

Later in his career, he toured with Murray Head, Penguin Cafe Orchestra and Bob Geldof. He has also recorded with Murray Head, including Between Us (1979), Innocence (1993) and Pipe Dreams (1996). He released a solo album, Viola Mon Amour, in 1993, followed by three albums with fellow Caravan band member Jim Leverton, Follow Your Heart (1995), Poor Man's Rich Man (2000) and The End of The Pier Show (2006). In 2011 he released another solo album, Moving Up A Cloud, and in 2016, The Garden of Love.

As of 2016, Richardson continues to be an active member of Caravan, having toured in 2011 and performed on a cruise with the group in 2015.

== Discography ==
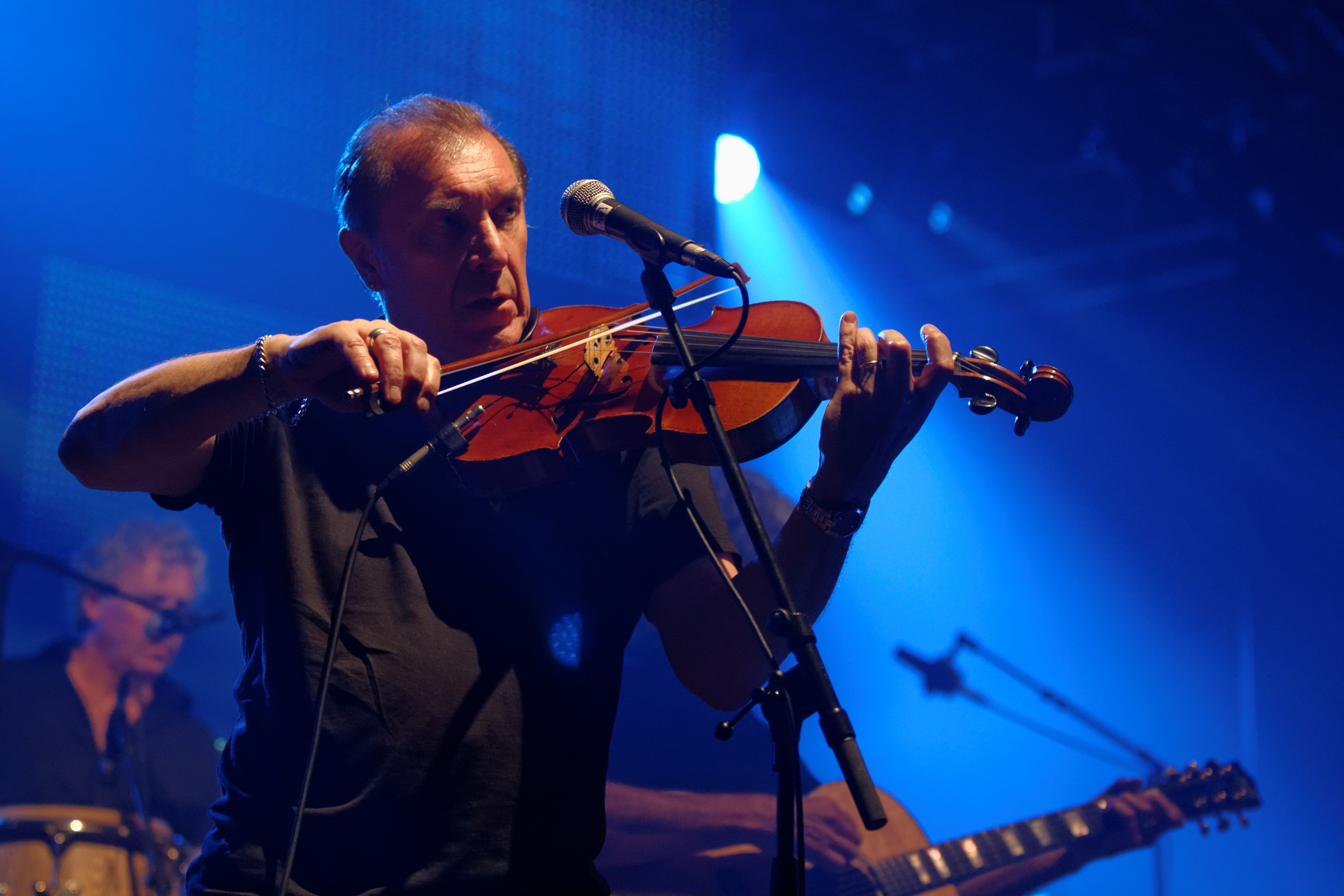
Richardson performing in 2013

Year	Player	Title
1973	Caravan	For Girls Who Grow Plump in the Night
1974	Caravan	Caravan and the New Symphonia
1974	Kevin Ayers	The Confessions of Dr. Dream and Other Stories
1975	Caravan	Cunning Stunts
1976	Caravan	Blind Dog at St. Dunstans
1976	John G. Perry	Sunset Wading
1977	Caravan	Better by Far
1977	Quantum Jump	Barracuda
1977	Quantum Jump	Mixing
1977	Ozark Mountain Daredevils	Don't Look Down
1977	Café Jacques	Round The Back
1978	Café Jacques	International
1979	Murray Head	Between Us
1979	John Glover	Midnight Over England
1980	Caravan	The Album
1980	Buzzcocks	Why She's a Girl From The Chainstore
1980	Bob Weston	Nightlight
1980	Wildlife	Burning
1980	Rupert Hine	Immunity
1981	Murray Head	Voices
1981	Murray Head	Find the Crowd
1982	Rupert Hine	Waving Not Drowning
1982	Murray Head	Shade
1982	John Greaves	Accident
1982	Julien Clerc	Femmes, Indicrétions, Blasphéme
1983	Penguin Cafe Orchestra	Penguin Cafe Orchestra
1983	Penguin Cafe Orchestra	The Penguin Cafe Orchestra Mini Album
1984	Penguin Cafe Orchestra	Broadcasting from Home
1984	Murray Head	Restless
1985	Microdisney	The Clock Comes Down The Stairs
1986	Murray Head	Sooner or Later
1986	Murray Head	Some People
1987	Paul Brady	Primitive Dance
1987	Penguin Cafe Orchestra	Signs of Life
1988	Penguin Cafe Orchestra	When in Rome
1990	Thinkman	Hard Hat Zone
1990	Dubh Chapter	Silence, Cunning & Exile
1990	Bob Geldof	The Vegetarians of Love
1991	The Cross	Blue Rock
1991	BBC Concert Orchestra	'Still Life' at the Penguin Cafe
1991	Murray Head	Wave
1991	Renaud	Marchand de cailloux
1991	Bliss	A Change in the Weather
1992	Bob Geldof	The Happy Club
1992	Chris de Burgh	Power of Ten
1993	Milla Jovovich	The Divine Comedy
1993	Penguin Cafe Orchestra	Union Café
1993	Rachid Taha	Rachid Taha
1993	Geoffrey Richardson	Viola Mon Amour
1993	Salif Keita & Steve Hillage	L'Enfant Lion
1994	Penguin Cafe Orchestra	Concert Program
1994	Renaud	A La Belle de Mai
1995	Caravan	The Battle of Hastings
1995	Murray Head	When You're in Love
1995	Jim Leverton & Geoffrey Richardson	Follow Your Heart
1995	Murray Head	Pipe Dreams
1995	Nina Morato	L'Allumeuse
1995	John G Perry	Seabird
1995	Rachid Taha	Olé, Olé
1996	Caravan	All Over You
1996	Nick Heyward	Tangled
1996	Bruno Maman	Aujourd'hui
1996	Renaud	Paris/Provinces
1997	Frankie Valentine	Summary of Evidence
1997	Rachid Taha	Diwan
1997	Métisse	Singe
1997	Justin Hayward	The View From The Hill
1997	Penguin Cafe Orchestra	Preludes, Airs and Yodels
1998	Linda McCartney	Wide Prairie
1998	Wolf Maahn	Album
1998	Rachid Taha/Khaled/Faudel	1,2,3 Soleils
1998	Rachid Taha	Carte Blanche
1998	Bloem de Ligny	Zink
1999	Sadia	Pieces
1999	Nova Nova	La Chanson de Roland
1999	The Uncalled Four	Rubbed Raw
1999	Caravan	Surprise Supplies – Live
1999	Caravan	All Over You Too
1999	Rachid Taha	Made in Medina
2000	Kofi Dako	Kologo
2000	Jim Leverton & Geoffrey Richardson	Poor Man's Rich Man
2000	Francis Kendall	Goodbye Rambling Man
2000	Penguin Cafe Orchestra	Simon Jeffes Piano Music
2000	Various	Miniatures 2 (Music for the Millennium)
2000	Nova Nova	Plaid
2001	Howard Jones	Metamorphosis
2002	Caravan	Live at Fairfield Halls, 1974
2002	Mostly Autumn	Catch The Spirit
2002	Michael Giles	Progress
2003	Caravan	The Unauthorized Breakfast Item
2003	Francis Kendall & Geoffrey Richardson	Oh Sister...
2004	Francis Kendall & Geoffrey Richardson	Estella in Lux
2005	David Blosse	Pilot Episode
2005	Julian Whitfield	Christopher
2005	Jim Leverton	Bright New Way
2005	The Fat River Band	The Last Great Guitar Heist
2005	Jim Laslett	Loving Should Be Easy
2006	Lupen Crook	Accidents Occur Whilst Sleeping
2006	Jim Leverton & Geoffrey Richardson	The End of the Pier Show
2006	Paul Roland	Re-animator
2007	Maestoso	Caterwauling
2007	Raphael Mead	On The Hill
2007	Murray Head	Tête à Tête
2007	Darwin Bay	Pluies Acides
2008	Murray Head	Rien N'est Ecrit
2008	Up-C Down-C Left-C Right-C	Embers
2008	Chris de Burgh	Footsteps
2008	Renaud	Tournée Rouge Sang (the Rouge Sang live album)
2009	Renaud	Molly Malone – Balade irlandaise
2009	Mandalaband	Ancestors
2009	Amber	Album
2009	Chris de Burgh	You'll Never Walk Alone
2010	Raphael Mead	Ruled by the Heart
2010	Juanes	P.A.R.C.E.
2010	Murray Head	Live 2009/Collection Live 2009
2010	Chris de Burgh	Moonfleet
2011	Chris de Burgh	Footsteps 2
2011	Geoffrey Richardson	Moving Up A Cloud
2011	Last Knight	Talking to the Moon
2011	Mattea de Luca	Album
2013	Caravan	Paradise Filter
2016	Geoffrey Richardson	The Garden of Love

== Filmography ==
- 2015: Romantic Warriors III: Canterbury Tales (DVD)
