= Helen Liebmann =

English avant-pop cellist

- Origin: England
- Genres: Avant-garde; avant-pop
- Occupations: Musician; music therapist
- Instrument: Cello
- Years active: 1970s–present
- Member of: Penguin Cafe Orchestra
- Education: Royal Academy of Music

Helen Liebmann is an English cellist.

She studied at the Royal Academy of Music. In addition to playing cello with a number of different ensembles, she is also a practicing music therapist.

Along with Simon Jeffes, she was a founding member of the Penguin Cafe Orchestra, an avant-pop music group, in 1973.
