= Simon Jeffes =

British musician and composer (1949–1997)

- Born: Simon Harry Piers Jeffes; 19 February 1949; Crawley, Sussex, England
- Died: 11 December 1997 (aged 48); Taunton, Somerset, England
- Occupations: Guitarist; composer; arranger
- Known for: Founder of the Penguin Cafe Orchestra

Simon Harry Piers Jeffes (19 February 1949 – 11 December 1997) was an English classically trained guitarist, composer and arranger. He formed, and was the primary performer of, the Penguin Cafe Orchestra. He was the composer of the ballet Still Life at the Penguin Cafe, of the much-recorded piece Music for a Found Harmonium, and other music recorded by the Penguin Cafe Orchestra.

He is also known for assisting Sex Pistols producer Bill Price with the string arrangement for the Sid Vicious version of "My Way" which reached #7 on the UK singles charts as part of The Great Rock 'n' Roll Swindle soundtrack.

A recording of piano works by Jeffes, Piano Music, was released by Zopf Records in 1998.

== Life and death ==
Jeffes was born at the Montalan Nursing Home, Crawley, Sussex, on 19 February 1949, the son of James Henry Elliston Jeffes, a research chemist, and his wife, Anne Hope Madeline Jeffes (née Clutterbuck).

Jeffes is the father of Arthur Jeffes, who is continuing his father's musical work with Penguin Cafe.

Jeffes died of an inoperable brain tumor on 11 December 1997 in Taunton, leading to the dissolution of the Penguin Cafe Orchestra.
