= Last (Unthanks album) =

Studio album by the Unthanks
- Released: 14 March 2011
- Genre: Folk
- Length: 49:38
- Labels: UK: Rabble Rouser/ EMI Records (EMI 095 9942); Australia: Fuse Australia (FMG101); Europe and North America: Rough Trade Records (RGTE 617)
- Producer: Adrian McNally

The Unthanks chronology
Here's the Tender Coming (2009)	Last (2011)	The Songs of Robert Wyatt and Antony & the Johnsons (2011)

Singles from Last
- 1. "Last (radio edit)" Released: 13 June 2011

Professional ratings
Aggregate scores
Source	Rating
Metacritic	81/100
Review scores
Source	Rating
AllMusic	4/5 stars
The Daily Telegraph	4/5 stars
The Guardian	4/5 stars
Mojo	4/5 stars
NME	8/10
Pitchfork	7.6/10
PopMatters	8/10
Q	4/5 stars
Record Collector	4/5 stars
Uncut	4/5 stars

Last, the fourth album by English folk group the Unthanks, was released on 14 March 2011. It reached number 40 in the UK Albums Chart and was well received by the critics, receiving a five-starred review in the Sunday Express and four-starred reviews in The Guardian and The Daily Telegraph.

== Songs ==
As well as traditional material, the album included a song written by band member Adrian McNally ("Last"), and versions of songs by Jon Redfern ("Give Away Your Heart"), Tom Waits and Kathleen Brennan ("No One Knows I'm Gone"), King Crimson ("Starless") and Alex Glasgow ("Close the Coalhouse Door"). "Last" was also issued as a single, edited for radio play; this was released on 13 June 2011.

== Reception ==
Sid Smith, for BBC Music, said that "Proving once again that sad songs are very often the best, their fourth album is brimming with material that is as haunting as it is beautiful." In a five-starred review for the Sunday Express, Martin Townsend proclaimed it "a gorgeously unhurried, utterly mesmerising masterpiece".

Mark Deming, in a four-starred review for AllMusic, described Last as "a striking fusion of British folk music with austere, arty pop, featuring adventurous arrangements and dynamics that recall acts like Tindersticks, Sufjan Stevens, and American Music Club". In a four-starred review for The Guardian, Robin Denselow described it as "a bold and highly original set". Thomas H Green of The Daily Telegraph also gave the album four stars and said it was "string-laden and luscious but also delicate, wistful and melancholy".

Josh Modell of Spin magazine said that on the album the Unthank sisters "sing gorgeously doleful tales inspired by (and frequently taken from) Old English history, rendered in crisp, warm recordings". David Bevan, reviewing the album for Pitchfork, said of Rachel and Becky Unthank's voices: "The revolving harmonies of 'Canny Hobbie Elliot' are emblematic of how well they can work together. Though it's one of the few songs on Last that isn't sad and bleak, their voices come together just so, and the result is mystifying and devastating." Writing in NME, Anthony Thornton said that the album "proves the mix of Rachel and Becky’s voices to be one of the true wonders of 21st-century music".

Graeme Thomson, writing for Uncut, said: "This is a bleakly beautiful record which unfolds slowly... And while there’s a tendency for the songs to merge into one indistinct flow, it seems self-defeating to try to unpick the individual strands of this LP: its strength lies in holding a distinct – and chilly – atmosphere throughout." Ben Myers, reviewing Last for The Quietus, said: "When the latest pop fad fades from view, The Unthanks music will continue to resonate down through the generations... This is music that will last. And that perhaps is precisely the point that the ambiguous album title is getting at."

The album reached number 40 for two weeks in the UK Albums Chart.

== Charts ==
Chart (2011)	Peak position
Irish Albums (IRMA)	44
Scottish Albums (Official Charts)	47
UK Albums (Official Charts)	40
UK Album Downloads (Official Charts)	75

== Track listing ==
No	Title	Lyrics and music	Length
1	"Gan To The Kye" (Roud 3162)	Traditional, arranged by the Unthanks	5:39
2	"The Gallowgate Lad"	Lyrics: Joe Wilson. Music: Traditional (Tune: Sally Grey), arranged by the Unthanks	6:06
3	"Queen of Hearts" (Roud 3195)	Traditional, arranged by the Unthanks	4:32
4	"Last"	Adrian McNally	7:09
5	"Give Away Your Heart"	Jon Redfern	3:49
6	"No One Knows I'm Gone"	Tom Waits/Kathleen Brennan (Tom Waits cover)	2:11
7	"My Laddie Sits Ower Late Up" (Roud 3181)	Traditional, arranged by the Unthanks	2:45
8	"Canny Hobbie Elliot" (Roud 8986)	Traditional, arranged by the Unthanks	3:28
9	"Starless"	Cross/Fripp/Wetton/Palmer-James (King Crimson cover)	6:00
10	"Close The Coalhouse Door"	Alex Glasgow	7:02
11	"Last" (reprise)	Adrian McNally	0:57

Total album length = 49:38

== Personnel ==
The Unthanks

- Rachel Unthank – voice, kalimba
- Becky Unthank – voice
- Niopha Keegan – violin, voice
- Adrian McNally – piano, dulcitone, voice, drums
- Chris Price – bass, acoustic and electric guitar, ukulele

Additional musicians

- Ros Stephen – violin
- Becca Spencer – viola
- Jo Silverston – cello
- Lizzie Jones – trumpet
- Dean Ravera – double bass
- Alex Neilson – drums
- Julian Sutton – melodeon

== Production and release ==
The album was produced by Adrian McNally; he and Thom Lewis were the sound engineers. The album was mastered by Denis Blackham and was released in the UK by Rabble Rouser Music on 14 March 2011. It was released in Europe and North America by Rough Trade Records and in Australia on the Fuse Music Group label.

The artwork for the album was by Steven Wainwright. The front cover incorporated an illustration from an 1863 edition of Harper's Weekly by American artist Winslow Homer whose career included painting for two years in the North East of England. (Note: Homer lived in the coastal village of Cullercoats from 1881 to 1882.)

== See also ==
- Archive Treasures 2005–2015, which includes an alternative demo version of "Queen of Hearts"
