= Live and Unaccompanied =

Live album by The Unthanks
- Released: 15 May 2020
- Recorded: April/May 2019
- Venues: Belfast, Bellaghy, Brighton, Dublin, Durham, London and Newcastle upon Tyne
- Genres: Folk, a cappella
- Label: Rabble Rouser Music
- Producer: Adrian McNally

The Unthanks chronology
Lines (2019)	Live and Unaccompanied (2020)	Sorrows Away (2022)

Live and Unaccompanied is an a cappella album by English folk group the Unthanks, recorded live at various venues in the UK and Ireland in April and May 2019 and released in March 2020. It consists of 13 songs, sung by Rachel and Becky Unthank and Niopha Keegan without the accompaniment of other members of the Unthanks band. The audio CD is also packaged in a "Special film edition" which includes a film on DVD, As We Go, by Ainslie Henderson (who is the partner of band member Becky Unthank), about the Unthanks' life on the road.

The album is designated Vol. 5 in the Unthanks' Diversions series and follows on from Vol. 1 (The Songs of Robert Wyatt and Antony & the Johnsons), released in November 2011, Vol. 2 (The Unthanks with Brighouse and Rastrick Brass Band), released in July 2012, Vol. 3 (Songs from the Shipyards), released in November 2012 and Vol. 4 (The Songs and Poems of Molly Drake), released in May 2017.

== Track listing ==
- "One by One" (Connie Converse) – 2:55
- "Magpie" (Davey Dodds) – 5:01
- "I'm Weary of Lying Alone" (Roud 9384) (traditional; arranged by the Unthanks) – 3:16
- "Geordie Wedding Set: We'll Aal Be Wed in Our Auld Claiths" (traditional; arranged by the Unthanks) / "Hi Canny Man" (traditional; arranged by the Unthanks) – 2:43
- "Griesly Bride" (words by John Manifold, music by Tom Campbell) – 3:55
- "Bees: Honeybee"(Connie Converse) / "The Bee-Boy's Song" (words by Rudyard Kipling, music by Peter Bellamy) – 4:31
- "Guard Yer Man Weel" (Johnny Handle; the Unthanks) – 4:35
- "Poor Mum" (Molly Drake) – 2:05
- "Where've Yer Bin Dick" (Lee Nicholson) – 1:08
- "We Picked Apples in a Graveyard Freshly Mowed" (Richard Dawson) – 4:54
- "Bread and Roses" (James Oppenheim, Mimi Fariña) – 3:27
- "Caught in a Storm" (Graeme Miles) – 4:46
- "Farewell Shanty" (traditional; arranged by the Unthanks) – 2:16

== Personnel ==
- Rachel Unthank – voice
- Becky Unthank – voice
- Niopha Keegan – voice
