= The Unthanks =

English folk group

Background information
- Origin: Tyne and Wear, England, United Kingdom
- Genre: Folk
- Years active: 2004–present
- Labels: Rabble Rouser, EMI, Rough Trade
- Members: Rachel Unthank; Becky Unthank; Adrian McNally; Niopha Keegan; Chris Price
- Past members: (of Rachel Unthank and the Winterset); Belinda O'Hooley; Jackie Oates; Stef Conner
- Website: www.the-unthanks.com

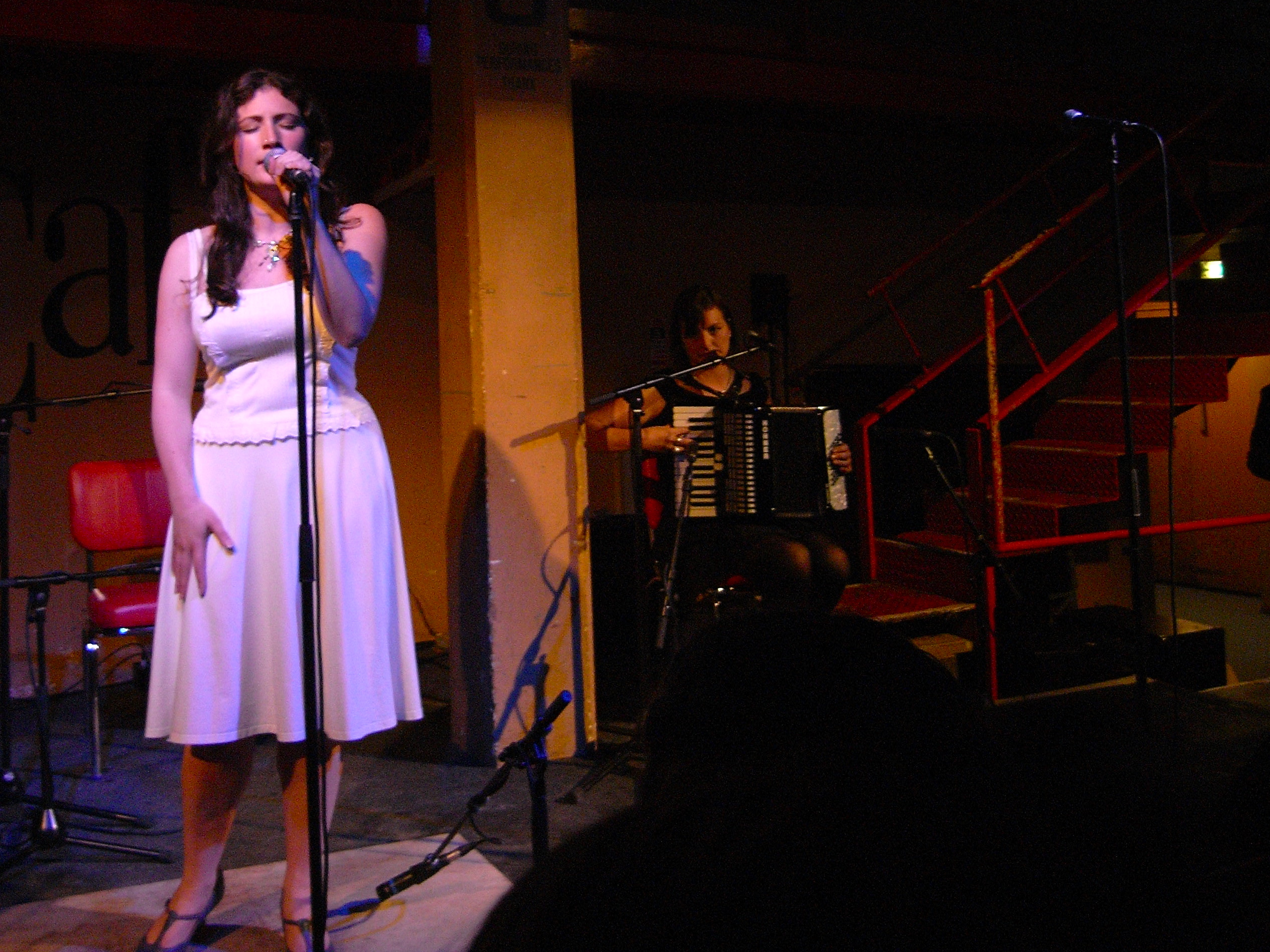
The Unthanks

The Unthanks (until 2009 called Rachel Unthank and the Winterset) are an English folk group known for their eclectic approach in combining traditional English folk, particularly Northumbrian folk music, with other musical genres. (Note: "They may call themselves folk musicians, but it is the strains of jazz, foreign scales and other unlikely influences that set The Unthanks apart from the rest of the Neo-folk movement." Ed Rex (10 December 2011). "Singing Siblings". The Spectator. Archived from the original on 9 February 2017.) (Note: "The Unthanks seem to regard folk music the same way Miles Davis regarded jazz: as a launchpad for exploring the wider possibilities." Graeme Thomson (18 March 2011). "The Unthanks – Last". Uncut. Archived from the original on 24 July 2021.) Their debut album, Cruel Sister, was Mojo magazine's Folk Album of the Year in 2005. Of their 11 subsequent albums, ten have received four or five-starred reviews in the British national press. Their album Mount the Air, released in 2015, won in the best album category in the 2016 BBC Radio 2 Folk Awards. Their 2024 double album, In Winter, received a four-starred review in the Financial Times and a five-starred review in The Times.

== Career ==
=== Rachel Unthank and the Winterset ===
==== Cruel Sister ====
Originally an all-female band, Rachel Unthank and the Winterset made their debut performance at Holmfirth Folk Festival on 7 May 2004 and launched their debut album Cruel Sister at the same festival venue the following year, on 11 May 2005. Cruel Sister received support from a number of DJs on BBC Radio 2 and was subsequently awarded Folk Album of the Year by Mojo magazine.

==== The Bairns ====
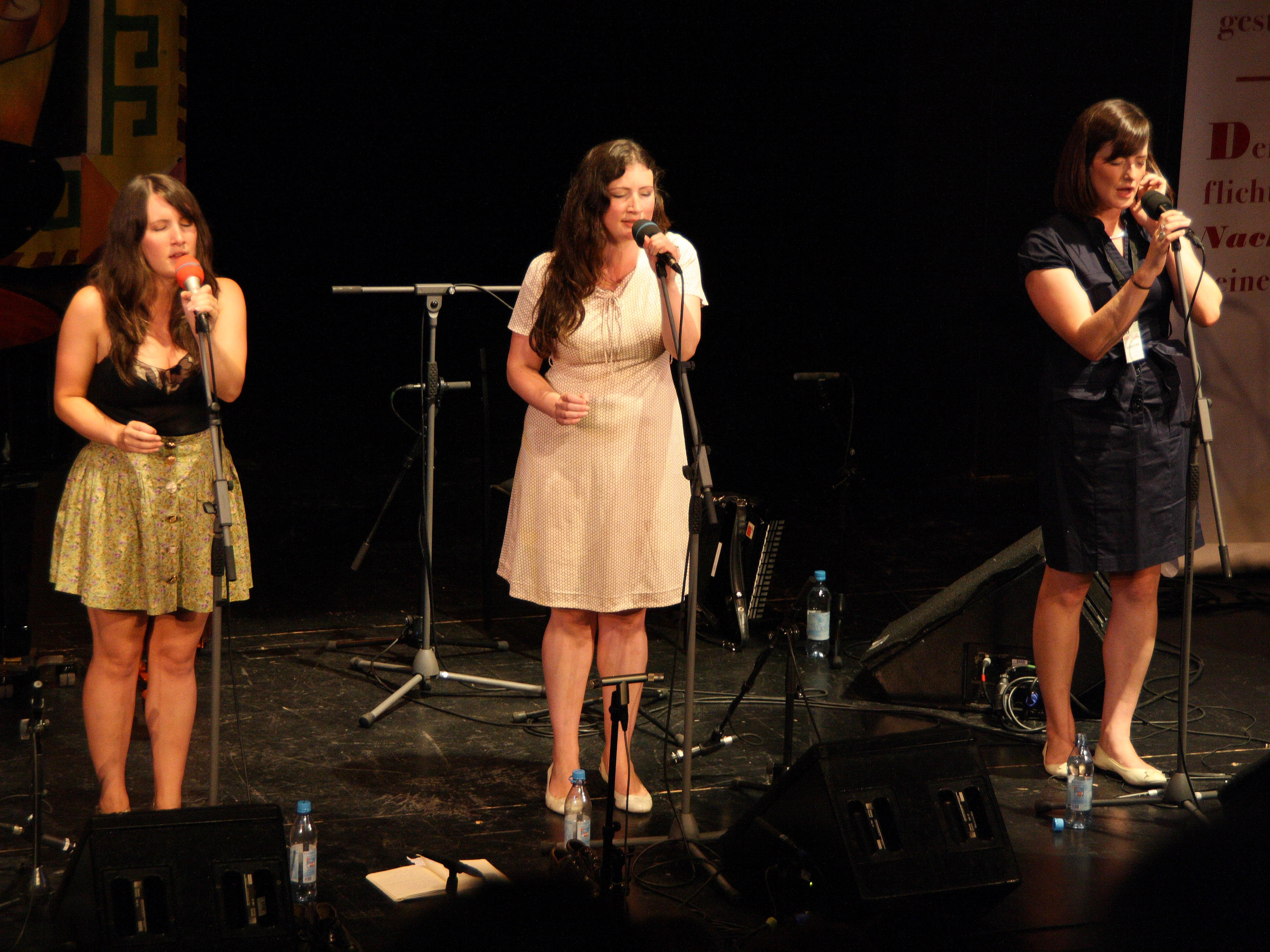
Becky and Rachel Unthank with Niopha Keegan at TFF Rudolstadt, 2009

Their follow-up album, The Bairns, released on 20 August 2007, was nominated for the Best Album award at the BBC Radio 2 Folk Awards 2008 and was runner-up for the 2008 Mercury Prize. The album debuted in the UK Top 200 Albums Chart at number 178 in the week after the Mercury Prize award ceremony. Reviewing The Bairns for BBC Music, Mel Ledgard described it as "an album with a cinematic quality, huge in dramatic atmosphere". In a four-starred review, Robin Denselow of The Guardian nominated it as "one of the folk records of the year".

The band were nominated for three further BBC Radio 2 Folk Awards in 2008 (Best Band, Best Live Act, Horizon Award), and were successful in one category, receiving the Horizon Award at the ceremony in The Brewery, London.

=== The Unthanks ===
==== Here's the Tender Coming ====
In 2009, the band became the Unthanks, and their manager Adrian McNally and his childhood friend Chris Price joined the group. Here's the Tender Coming, their third album (and the first under the Unthanks moniker), was released on 14 September 2009. It was Folk Album of the Year for The Guardian and also for Mojo magazine. Sid Smith, of BBC Music, described it as an "astonishing record", "beautiful", "haunting", and "beguiling". In a four-starred review for The Guardian, Colin Irwin said: "Their arrangement of the title track − a traditional song about the emotional devastation wrought by press gangs − brilliantly encapsulates the story's fraught desperation. Their version of Nobody Knew She Was There, one of Ewan MacColl's lesser-known songs about his mother, painstakingly paints a similarly dramatic backdrop with more atmospheric brass, and they put their own stamp on the Nic Jones classic, Annachie Gordon."

==== Last ====
Their fourth album, Last, was released on 14 March 2011, reaching number 40 in the UK albums chart, and received a five-starred review in the Sunday Express and four-starred reviews in The Guardian and The Daily Telegraph. In his review for the Sunday Express, Martin Townsend proclaimed it "a gorgeously unhurried, utterly mesmerising masterpiece". Thomas H Green of The Daily Telegraph said it was "string-laden and luscious but also delicate, wistful and melancholy". Robin Denselow, for The Guardian, described it as "a bold and highly original set". Sid Smith, for BBC Music, said that "Proving once again that sad songs are very often the best, their fourth album is brimming with material that is as haunting as it is beautiful."

Writing in NME, Anthony Thornton said that the album "proves the mix of Rachel and Becky's voices to be one of the true wonders of 21st-century music". As well as traditional material, the album included a song written by band member McNally ("Last"), and versions of songs by Jon Redfern ("Give Away Your Heart"), Tom Waits and Kathleen Brennan ("No One Knows I'm Gone"), King Crimson ("Starless") and Alex Glasgow ("Close the Coalhouse Door").

==== The Songs of Robert Wyatt and Antony & The Johnsons ====
In a departure from their usual practice of showcasing material from their studio albums, the Unthanks performed two concerts at London's Union Chapel on 8 and 9 December 2010 consisting entirely of material written by Robert Wyatt and by Anohni of Anohni and the Johnsons. The Songs of Robert Wyatt and Antony & The Johnsons, a live album based on recordings of these concerts, was released on 28 November 2011 to coincide with a UK tour. In a four-starred review, The Observer called the album "A triumphant excursion".

==== The Unthanks with Brighouse and Rastrick Brass Band ====
In July 2011, starting with concerts at Durham Cathedral and at London's Barbican Hall, they began a UK tour with the Brighouse and Rastrick Brass Band, performing new brass arrangements of songs from all four Unthanks albums, as well as new material. A live album, based on these concerts, was released in July 2012. In a four-starred review, Robin Denselow of The Guardian described the album as the Unthanks' boldest experiment yet. In a five-starred review, Martin Townsend in the Daily Express said it was "easily the band's best and most mature album to date". The album was designated Vol. 2 in the Unthanks' Diversions series and followed on from Vol. 1 (The Songs of Robert Wyatt and Antony & The Johnsons).

==== Songs from the Shipyards ====
Songs from the Shipyards, Vol. 3 in the Unthanks' Diversions series, was released in November 2012. This is a studio-recorded album of songs from a soundtrack, compiled by the Unthanks, which was first performed live in February 2011 at Newcastle upon Tyne's Tyneside Cinema to accompany the showing of a documentary film by Richard Fenwick about the history of shipbuilding on the Tyne, Wear and Tees. The album includes Elvis Costello's "Shipbuilding" and songs by Graeme Miles, Alex Glasgow, Archie Fisher, John Tams, Peter Bellamy and Jez Lowe, plus a centrepiece track, "The Romantic Tees", written by McNally. In a four-starred review The Observer's Neil Spencer described it as "a stark creation, using little more than piano, violin and voices" but said that its minimalism "lends poignancy to songs and poetry narrating the glory and grime of a vanished era".

==== Mount the Air ====
Their album Mount the Air, released in February 2015, received five-starred reviews in The Daily Telegraph and The Irish Times. The Telegraph's reviewer Helen Brown described the album as "a slow, swirling affair that mixes original material with traditional tales. Underpinned by McNally's cool, fluid piano it's simultaneously ancient and fresh." Joe Breen, writing in The Irish Times, called it "their most ambitious work" and said that it "places them in the same league as the likes of The Gloaming and the Punch Brothers".

In a four-starred review for the Financial Times, David Honigmann said: "Once a bleak Northumbrian chamber folk outfit, the Unthanks have reinvented themselves on a symphonic scale, as witness the 10-minute title track, ushered in on harps and with an orchestration that recalls Gil Evans's work for Miles Davis." Robin Denselow, in a four-starred review for The Guardian, said: "This is a return to the gentle melancholia of Last, and while there are fine vocals from the Unthank sisters, the dominant figure is Rachel's husband, Adrian McNally, who plays keyboards and percussion, and produced and wrote much of the music... It's a lush, often exquisite set". Teddy Jamieson, writing in the Sunday Herald, said: "The Unthanks return with an album that takes the folk tradition the sisters grew up on and sails it into wilder waters... Folk's storytelling tradition is still very much at the heart of this album. But what thrills here is the sense of scale at play in the music, the unrushed, easeful way the musicians stretch into songs, let them linger without ever overstaying their welcome. That and the earthy humanity of the sisters' voices." However, The Observer's Neil Spencer bucked the trend, giving the album three stars and criticising the "ambitious but lumbering orchestration... Two instrumentals eschew the group's strength; more voices please".

Mount the Air was the winner in the best album category in the 2016 BBC Radio 2 Folk Awards.

==== Memory Box and Archive Treasures 2005–2015 ====
In December 2015 the Unthanks released Memory Box, a package containing a new CD, a Christmas 7" single (their first single to be issued in this format) and other items to commemorate the band's 10th anniversary. The CD, Archive Treasures 2005–2015, which was also released as a stand-alone item, includes exclusive live tracks, demos and outtakes and BBC session tracks.

==== The Songs and Poems of Molly Drake ====
In May 2017 they released two albums, The Songs and Poems of Molly Drake and The Songs and Poems of Molly Drake: Extras, featuring songs written by Molly Drake, mother of Nick Drake. The Songs and Poems of Molly Drake received a five-starred review in The Independent.

==== Lines ====
Lines, a trilogy of albums about the 1968 Hull triple trawler tragedy, poetry of the First World War and the poems of Emily Brontë, was pre-released on the band's website in November 2018 and officially released on 22 February 2019. It received a four-starred review in The Guardian.

==== Live and Unaccompanied ====
Live and Unaccompanied, released in March 2020, is an audio CD of 13 songs, sung by Rachel and Becky Unthank and Niopha Keegan without the accompaniment of other members of The Unthanks band. The album was recorded live at various venues in the UK and Ireland in April and May 2019. It was also packaged in a "special film edition" which includes a film, As We Go by musician and animator Ainslie Henderson (Becky Unthank's partner), about The Unthanks' life on the road.

The album is designated Vol. 5 in the Unthanks' Diversions series and follows on from Vol. 1 (The Songs of Robert Wyatt and Antony & The Johnsons), released in 2011, Vol. 2 (The Unthanks with Brighouse and Rastrick Brass Band), released in 2012, Vol. 3 (Songs from the Shipyards), released in 2012 and Vol. 4 (The Songs and Poems of Molly Drake), released in 2017.

==== Sorrows Away ====
The Unthanks' album Sorrows Away was released on 14 October 2022 and received four-starred reviews in The Observer and The Scotsman and a five-starred review in the Financial Times.

==== In Winter ====
Their double album, In Winter, released on 29 November 2024, received a four-starred review in the Financial Times and a five-starred review in The Times.

==== Other recordings ====
The Unthanks performed the title track "Oak, Ash and Thorn" on the 2011 album Oak Ash Thorn, a compilation of songs by Rudyard Kipling set to music by Peter Bellamy. The 2012 album Harbour of Songs, produced by McNally, featured the Unthanks in two songs, "The Ruler" with Nick Hornby and "Dream of a Tree in a Spanish Graveyard" with Ian MacMillan. The latter track subsequently appeared on the Unthanks' album of archive recordings, Archive Treasures 2005–2015. In 2015, the Unthanks contributed vocals to the song "A Forest" from the album 8:58, a project by Paul Hartnoll.

Rachel and Becky Unthank are featured on Sting's 2013 album The Last Ship and on Kathryn Tickell's 2016 album Water of Tyne. Rachel Unthank provided vocals and cello on Simon Haworth's 1998 album Coast to Coast and on his 2003 album Taking Routes. She also played cello on Julian Sutton's 2005 album Melodeon Crimes. Rachel Unthank and Adrian McNally provided backing vocals on Jonny Kearney & Lucy Farrell's 2010 EP The North Farm Sessions and on their 2011 album Kite. Becky Unthank provided vocals and music boxes on Martin Green's 2014 album Crows' Bones and co-wrote two of the songs. She also sings on Martin Green's 2016 album Flit.

In February 2023 Rachel Unthank released an album with Paul Smith, lead singer of the alternative rock band Maxïmo Park. Reviewing it for KLOF Magazine, Hannah Webber described Unthank: Smith’s Nowhere and Everywhere as "a triumph, an amalgamation of musical style and defiance of genre, one that celebrates and commemorates the experiences of ordinary people". The album, which received a four-starred review from Jude Rogers in The Guardian, includes an original song by Rachel Unthank: "Seven Tears".

==== Television and radio ====
On 16 December 2012 (repeated on 4 March 2013), the Unthanks presented A Very English Winter: The Unthanks, a one-hour television programme on BBC Four. This showed the customs that people celebrated on different days of the later autumn and winter, and ended with information about the famous Pancake Race at Olney.

Series 3 of the BBC Four TV series Detectorists was inspired by Davey Dodds' song "Magpie", as performed by the Unthanks on their album Mount the Air, and the song was played in the first episode of the series, first broadcast in November 2017. On 3 August 2018 the group performed at The Proms in Prom 27: Folk Music around Britain and Ireland. The Unthanks composed and performed the soundtrack for the 2019 BBC production of the television drama series Worzel Gummidge, and appeared on screen in the Christmas 2020 episode "Saucy Nancy".

== Personal lives ==
Rachel and Becky Unthank are sisters, born seven and a half years apart, who grew up in Ryton, Tyne and Wear. Rachel graduated from the University of Glasgow with a degree in History and Theatre Studies; Becky studied History of Art and Design at Manchester Metropolitan University. Their father, George Unthank, is an interior designer and a well-known local Northumberland folk singer in a group called The Keelers, named after the boatmen (keelmen) who sailed the Tyne. Their mother sings in folk choirs.

Rachel was married to, but is now divorced from, group member Adrian McNally. McNally grew up in a mining village near Barnsley, Yorkshire and as well as being a member of the band is also its manager, musical arranger and producer. They have two sons, born in 2011 and 2014.

== Members ==
Current

- Rachel Unthank (voice, cello, kalimba, feet) (Note: Clog dancing – and the sound that the feet make when they do it – is integral to the Unthanks' stage act and to the recording of some of their songs. They include "feet", alongside vocals and instruments, on their albums' track listings.)
- Becky Unthank (voice, autoharp, feet)
- Niopha Keegan (violin, viola, voice)
- Adrian McNally (piano, dulcitone, autoharp, marimba, celeste, kalimba, Fender Rhodes piano, chord organ, glockenspiel, Indian harmonium, drums, percussion, voice)
- Chris Price (guitar, bass guitar, double bass, ukulele, voice)

Former

- Belinda O'Hooley (piano, voice)
- Jackie Oates (violin, voice)
- Stef Conner (piano, voice)

== Discography ==
=== Rachel Unthank and the Winterset ===
Album	Release date
Cruel Sister	11 May 2005
The Bairns	20 August 2007

=== The Unthanks ===
Album	Release date	Notes
Here's the Tender Coming	14 September 2009	
Last	14 March 2011	
The Songs of Robert Wyatt and Antony & the Johnsons	28 November 2011	Vol. 1 in the Unthanks' Diversions series
The Unthanks with Brighouse and Rastrick Brass Band	30 July 2012	Vol. 2 in the Unthanks' Diversions series
Songs from the Shipyards	5 November 2012	Vol. 3 in the Unthanks' Diversions series
Mount the Air	9 February 2015	
Archive Treasures 2005–2015	11 December 2015	Archive recordings, most of them previously unreleased, spanning the group's then 10-year history of recording
The Songs and Poems of Molly Drake and The Songs and Poems of Molly Drake: Extras	26 May 2017	Vol. 4 in the Unthanks' Diversions series
Lines	22 February 2019	A trilogy of albums with a poetic theme – Part One: Lillian Bilocca; Part Two: World War One; Part Three: Emily Brontë
Live and Unaccompanied	15 May 2020	Vol. 5 in the Unthanks' Diversions series. Also available in a "Special film edition" which includes a film by Ainslie Henderson, As We Go, about The Unthanks' life on the road
Sorrows Away	14 October 2022	
In Winter	29 November 2024	Double album

Singles	Release date	Notes
"Lucky Gilchrist" (Single edit) (Adrian McNally)/ "Tar Barrel in Dale" (Live) (George Unthank)/ "Sexy Sadie" (Lennon and McCartney)	30 November 2009	Although sometimes described as an EP, this was released as a double A-sided single with a bonus track. "Lucky Gilchrist" is a single edit of one of the tracks on the Unthanks' Here's the Tender Coming album. "Tar Barrel in Dale" is taken from a live performance on Radcliffe and Maconie, BBC Radio 2, on 23 December 2008. The "bonus track", "Sexy Sadie", first appeared on the Mojo covermount CD album of Beatles covers, MOJO Presents the White Album Recovered.
"Last" (Radio edit) (Adrian McNally)	13 June 2011	From the album Last
"Mount the Air" (Single version) (Adrian McNally/Traditional/Becky Unthank)/ "Died for Love" (Traditional, arranged by Adrian McNally)	8 December 2014	From the album Mount the Air
"Flutter" (Becky Unthank/Adrian McNally)	16 February 2015	From the album Mount the Air
"Died For Love" (Traditional, arranged by Adrian McNally)	8 June 2015	From the album Mount the Air
"2000 Miles" (Chrissie Hynde) / "Tar Barrel in Dale" (George Unthank) (Christmas single 2015)	11 December 2015	From the album Archive Treasures 2005–2015
"The Bay of Fundy"	12 April 2022	From the album Sorrows Away
"The Old News"	22 July 2022	From the album Sorrows Away
"Dear Companions" (Tune: traditional; words by Becky Unthank and Ainslie Henderson)	21 October 2024	From the album In Winter

=== Various artists ===
Album	Release date	Notes
Oak, Ash, Thorn	21 February 2011	The Unthanks perform one track: "Oak, Ash and Thorn" (Traditional, arranged by the Unthanks).
Harbour of Songs	June 2012	The Unthanks perform two tracks: "The Ruler" with Nick Hornby and "Dream of a Tree in a Spanish Graveyard" with Ian MacMillan.
