= Here's the Tender Coming =

Studio album by the Unthanks
- Released: 14 September 2009
- Genre: Folk
- Length: 55:02
- Labels: Rabble Rouser (UK); Rough Trade Records/EMI (USA and Canada)
- Producer: Adrian McNally

The Unthanks chronology
| The Bairns (2007) | Here's the Tender Coming (2009) | Last (2011) |

Singles from Here's the Tender Coming
- 1. "Lucky Gilchrist" Released: 30 November 2009

Professional ratings
Aggregate scores
| Source | Rating |
|---|---|
| Metacritic | 81/100 |
Review scores
| Source | Rating |
| AllMusic | 4/5 stars |
| The Boston Phoenix | 3.5/4 stars |
| The Guardian | 4/5 stars |
| Mojo | 4/5 stars |
| The Observer | 4/5 stars |
| PopMatters | 8/10 |
| Q | 3/5 stars |
| Spin | 8/10 |
| Uncut | 4/5 stars |

Here's the Tender Coming, the third album by English folk group the Unthanks, and the first under The Unthanks moniker, was released in the United Kingdom on 14 September 2009 and in North America on 23 March 2010. It was Folk Album of the Year for Mojo and received four-starred reviews from The Observer and The Guardian. In the sleeve notes for the album, Rachel Unthank said that although the Tender in the album's title track refers to the boat that is on its way to press men to sea, "the title of this song seemed to encapsulate for us the feeling of our new album, which is perhaps calmer and a little warmer in contrast to the stark bleakness of The Bairns".

== Songs ==
The press-gang song "Here's the Tender Coming" (number 3174 in the Roud Folk Song Index) has been recorded by many other well-known folk artists, including Frankie Armstrong and Dave Burland.

"Lucky Gilchrist", the only original song on the album, was also released on 30 November 2009 as a single. Written by Adrian McNally, it tells the story of Gary Gilchrist, who Rachel Unthank knew when she was studying history at Glasgow University and who has since died. The song includes references to composer Steve Reich and Queen's lead vocalist Freddie Mercury, and its musical arrangement has been described as reminiscent of multi-instrumentalist Sufjan Stevens.

== Reception ==
Sid Smith of BBC Music described Here's the Tender Coming as an "astonishing record", "beautiful”, “haunting” and “beguiling". In a four-starred review for The Observer, Colin Irwin said: "This album may not be quite as bleak as The Bairns, and the sound is more sophisticated, but they still sound like nobody else... Tracks build slowly and mysteriously, but all are in service of the song. Their arrangement of the title track − a traditional song about the emotional devastation wrought by press gangs − brilliantly encapsulates the story's fraught desperation. Their version of Nobody Knew She Was There, one of Ewan MacColl's lesser-known songs about his mother, painstakingly paints a similarly dramatic backdrop with more atmospheric brass, and they put their own stamp on the Nic Jones classic, Annachie Gordon." Robin Denselow, in a four-starred review for The Guardian, called it "haunting, original and magnificent". Neil Spencer, for UNCUT, said: "It’s an often exquisite mixture of light and dark, instinct and artistry, that honours both the power of old songs and the stoicism of the lives that shaped them. Rarely has the deep past sounded so stirring, or so modern." The Italian website Ondarock said that by including songs such as "Where've Yer Bin Dick?", "Lucky Gilchrist", "Betsy Bell" and "Because He Was A Bonny Lad" on the album, the Unthanks had "add[ed] panache and verve, following the tradition of the music hall". Gavin Leech, for MusicVice.com, described the album as "a pleasant ride through misery" and praised its "sheer precision", claiming that tracks such as "Annachie Gordon" and "Living By The Water" are "the most polished folk you’re ever likely to hear". Luke Winkie, for DOA (Delusions of Adequacy), said: "Here’s The Tender Coming is incredibly methodical – everything moves at a very deliberate, very planned pace... The album feels very crafted because of it, organized as a true listening experience rather than a collection of songs".

== Track listing ==
1. "Because He Was a Bonny Lad" (Traditional: Roud 22834) (2:36)
2. "Sad February" (Graeme Miles) (4:36)
3. "Annachie Gordon" (Traditional: Child 239, Roud 102) (8:15)
4. "Lucky Gilchrist" (Adrian McNally) (4:52)
5. "The Testimony of Patience Kershaw" (Frank Higgins/The Unthanks) (4:05)
6. "Living by the Water" (Anne Briggs) (6:08)
7. "Where've Yer Bin Dick?" (Traditional) (0:47)
8. "Nobody Knew She Was There" (Ewan MacColl) (5:53)
9. "Flowers of the Town" (Anonymous) (3:06)
10. "Not Much Luck in Our House" (Traditional) (0:48)
11. "At First She Starts" (Lal Waterson/Oliver Knight) (3:38)
12. "Here's the Tender Coming" (Roud 3174) (Traditional) (5:28)

Hidden track: "Betsy Bell" (Traditional, arranged by the Unthanks: Roud 5211) (4:14)
Album length = 55:02

== Personnel ==
=== The Unthanks ===
- Rachel Unthank – voice, cello, ukulele, clogs
- Becky Unthank – voice, feet, (Note: Clog dancing – and the sound that the feet make when they do it – is integral to the Unthanks' stage act and to the recording of some of their songs. They list "feet", alongside vocals and instruments, in the album's sleeve notes.) autoharp
- Niopha Keegan – violin, voice, accordion, mandolin
- Adrian McNally – piano, dampened piano, plucked piano, drums, marimba, chime bars, autoharp, Wu-Han tam tam, Chinese temple gongs, tubular bells, backing voice
- Chris Price – guitar, bass, ukulele, dulcitone, marimba, backing voice

=== Additional musicians ===
- Jo Silverston – solo cello
- Rosie Biss – quartet cello
- Mike Gerrard – viola
- Andre Swanepoel – violin
- Iona Brown – violin
- Jenny Chang – violin
- Dan Rogers – bowed double bass
- Graham Hardy – trumpet, flugelhorn
- Simon Tarrant – trumpet
- Chris Hibberd – trombone
- Adam Sinclair – drums, cymbals, shaky egg
- Julian Sutton – melodeon
- Neil Harland – double bass
- Shelley Thomson – backing voice
- Jane Pollinger – backing voice

== Production and design ==
Adam Sinclair was the recording engineer for the album, which was recorded between April and June 2009 at Blast Studios, Newcastle upon Tyne. It was mixed at City Road Studios, Newcastle upon Tyne in June 2009 by the album's producer, Adrian McNally; Darren Hall was the engineer. It was mastered at Skye Mastering on the Isle of Skye by Denis Blackham and Adrian McNally.

The album cover was designed by Helen Thomas and Steven Wainwright, using photographs by Alex Telfer.
