= The Bairns (album) =

Studio album by Rachel Unthank and the Winterset
- Released: 20 August 2007 (UK)
- Recorded: January–March 2007
- Genre: Folk
- Length: 65:11
- Labels: EMI / Rabble Rouser (UK) • Shock Records/ Rabble Rouser (Australia) • Real World Records, Rykodisc (USA)
- Producer: Adrian McNally

Rachel Unthank and the Winterset chronology
Cruel Sister (2007)	The Bairns (2007)	Here's the Tender Coming (2009)

Professional ratings
Review scores
Source	Rating
AllMusic	4.5/5 stars
The Guardian	4 stars
MusicOMH	4.5/5 stars

The Bairns was the second album by Rachel Unthank and the Winterset (now the Unthanks), which then comprised Rachel Unthank, her younger sister Becky, pianist Belinda O'Hooley and fiddle player Niopha Keegan. Produced by Adrian McNally and released by Rabble Rouser on 20 August 2007, it was nominated for the Best Album award at the 2008 BBC Folk Awards and was also nominated for the 2008 Mercury Prize. It received a four-starred review in The Guardian.

== Reception ==
Reviewing The Bairns for BBC Music, Mel Ledgard described it as "an album with a cinematic quality, huge in dramatic atmosphere". Nic Oliver, in a 4.5-starred review for musicOMH, said it was a "remarkable album that is both contemporary and timeless". Iain Hazlewood, for Spiral Earth, described it as "[a] gorgeously melancholy and sensual album that has raised the bar several notches". FolkWorld said that The Bairns is "not your run-of-the-mill folk music. It is fragile and intimate, dark and chilling, with influences from blues and jazz music. It makes you shiver at times, at others uplifting like a vaudeville stage act." Justin Hopper, writing in Paste, called it "a milestone in English folk music". In a four-starred review, Robin Denselow of The Guardian nominated it as "one of the folk records of the year".

The Bairns was nominated for the Best Album award at the BBC Folk Awards 2008 and was also nominated for the 2008 Mercury Prize. The album debuted in the UK Top 200 Albums Chart at number 178 in the week after the Mercury Prize award ceremony.

== Track listing ==
1. "Felton Lonnin" (Roud 3166) (traditional/Johnny Handle, arranged by Rachel Unthank & The Winterset) 7:23
2. "Lull I" (traditional, arranged by Rachel Unthank & The Winterset) 1:23
3. "Blue Bleezing Blind Drunk" (traditional/Belle Stewart, arranged by Rachel Unthank & The Winterset) 5:13
4. "I Wish" (Roud 60; Laws P25) (traditional, arranged by Rachel Unthank & The Winterset) 6:24
5. "Blue's Gaen Oot o'the Fashion": "The Wedding O' Blythe" / "When the Tide Comes in" / "Blue's Gaen Oot o'the Fashion" / "The Lad With the Trousers on" / "The Sailors Are All at the Bar" (traditional, arranged by Rachel Unthank & The Winterset) 4.31
6. "Lull II: My Lad's a Canny Lad" (traditional, arranged by Rachel Unthank & The Winterset) 0:23
7. "Blackbird" (Belinda O'Hooley) 2:53
8. "Lull III: A Minor Place" (Will Oldham) 0:22
9. "Sea Song" (Robert Wyatt) 6:19
10. "Whitethorn" (Belinda O'Hooley) 6:04
11. "Lull IV: Can't Stop It Raining" (Richard Scott) 1:45
12. "My Donald" (Owen Hand) 8:06
13. "Ma Bonny Lad" (Roud 204) (traditional, arranged by Rachel Unthank & The Winterset) 1:57
14. "Fareweel Regality" (Terry Conway) 6:20
15. "Newcastle Lullaby" (Roud 2644) (traditional, arranged by Rachel Unthank & The Winterset) 6:23

Album length = 65:11

== Personnel ==
=== Rachel Unthank and the Winterset ===
- Rachel Unthank – voice, cello, ukulele, feet (Note: Clog dancing – and the sound that the feet make when they do it – is integral to the Unthanks' stage act and to the recording of some of their songs. They list "feet", alongside vocals and instruments, in the album's sleeve notes.)
- Becky Unthank – vocals, feet
- Belinda O'Hooley – piano, voice
- Niopha Keegan – fiddle, voice

=== Additional musicians ===
- Neil Harland – double bass
- Julian Sutton – melodeon
- String section on "Felton Lonnin": Iona Brown – violin; Andre Swanepoel – violin; Michael Gerrard – viola; Rosie Biss – cello

== Production and release ==
The album, which was released in the UK by EMI on 20 August 2007, was recorded and produced between January and March 2007 by Adrian McNally. It was mastered by Adrian McNally and Denis Blackham at Syke Mastering. The sound engineer was Oliver Knight.

The CD sleeve was designed by Steven Wainwright, incorporating photographs of the band taken at Beamish Museum, Co. Durham.

== See also ==
- The Songs of Robert Wyatt and Antony & the Johnsons, a 2011 album by the Unthanks, which includes a live version of "Sea Song"
- Archive Treasures 2005–2015, a compilation album by the Unthanks, which includes live versions of "Felton Lonnin'", "I Wish" and "Blue Bleezing Blind Drunk"
- WinterFolk Volume 1, a 2017 album by O'Hooley & Tidow, which includes a reworking of the song "Whitethorn"
