= The Unthanks with Brighouse and Rastrick Brass Band =

Live album by the Unthanks
- Released: 30 July 2012
- Genre: Folk
- Label: Rabble Rouser (RRM010)
- Producer: Adrian McNally

The Unthanks chronology
| The Songs of Robert Wyatt and Antony & the Johnsons (2011) | The Unthanks with Brighouse and Rastrick Brass Band (2012) | Songs from the Shipyards (2012) |

Professional ratings
Review scores
| Source | Rating |
|---|---|
| Daily Express | 5/5 stars |
| The Guardian | 4/5 stars |
| The Observer | 3/5 stars |

The Unthanks with Brighouse and Rastrick Brass Band, the sixth album by English folk group the Unthanks, was released on 30 July 2012. Its extended title is: Diversions, Vol. 2: The Unthanks with Brighouse and Rastrick Brass Band. Recorded at Salford's The Lowry, at Leeds Town Hall, at the Derby Assembly Rooms and St George's Bristol, it was the Unthanks' second live album. It was acclaimed by the critics, receiving a five-starred review in the Daily Express and a four-starred review in The Guardian.

== History ==
In a project commissioned by the Durham International Festival of Brass and supported by Arts Council England, and starting with concerts at Durham Cathedral and at London's Barbican Hall, the Unthanks began a UK tour in July 2011 with the Brighouse and Rastrick Brass Band, performing new brass arrangements of songs from all four Unthanks albums, as well as new material. The recording is of performances on that tour.

The album is designated Vol. 2 in the Unthanks' Diversions series and follows on from Vol. 1 (The Songs of Robert Wyatt and Antony & the Johnsons), which was released in December 2011. Vol. 3 (Songs from the Shipyards) was released in November 2012 and Vol. 4 (The Songs and Poems of Molly Drake) in May 2017.

== Reception ==
In a five-starred review, Martin Townsend in the Daily Express said it was "easily" the Unthanks' "best and most mature album to date". In a four-starred review, Robin Denselow of The Guardian described the album as the Unthanks' boldest experiment yet. Jeanette Leach, for BBC Music, said that while the album is "often emotionally naked, it is musically restorative. By entwining folk and marching bands, two boldly working-class styles, The Unthanks offer a strong hand of comfort to these tales of ordinary sadness". Kitty Empire, reviewing the album for The Observer, said: "The emotional clout is undeniable". Karin Horowitz of Bright Young Folk described it as "[a] suitable validation of The Unthanks’ evolving originality and their ability to blend traditional folk with a new edge". Tom Moyser, reviewing the album for For Folk's Sake, said: "every track is as reassuringly traditional as logs on a fireplace, but they crackle with a new wit in combinations that, without contradiction, show British folk – and brass band music – at its most innovative".

== Track listing ==
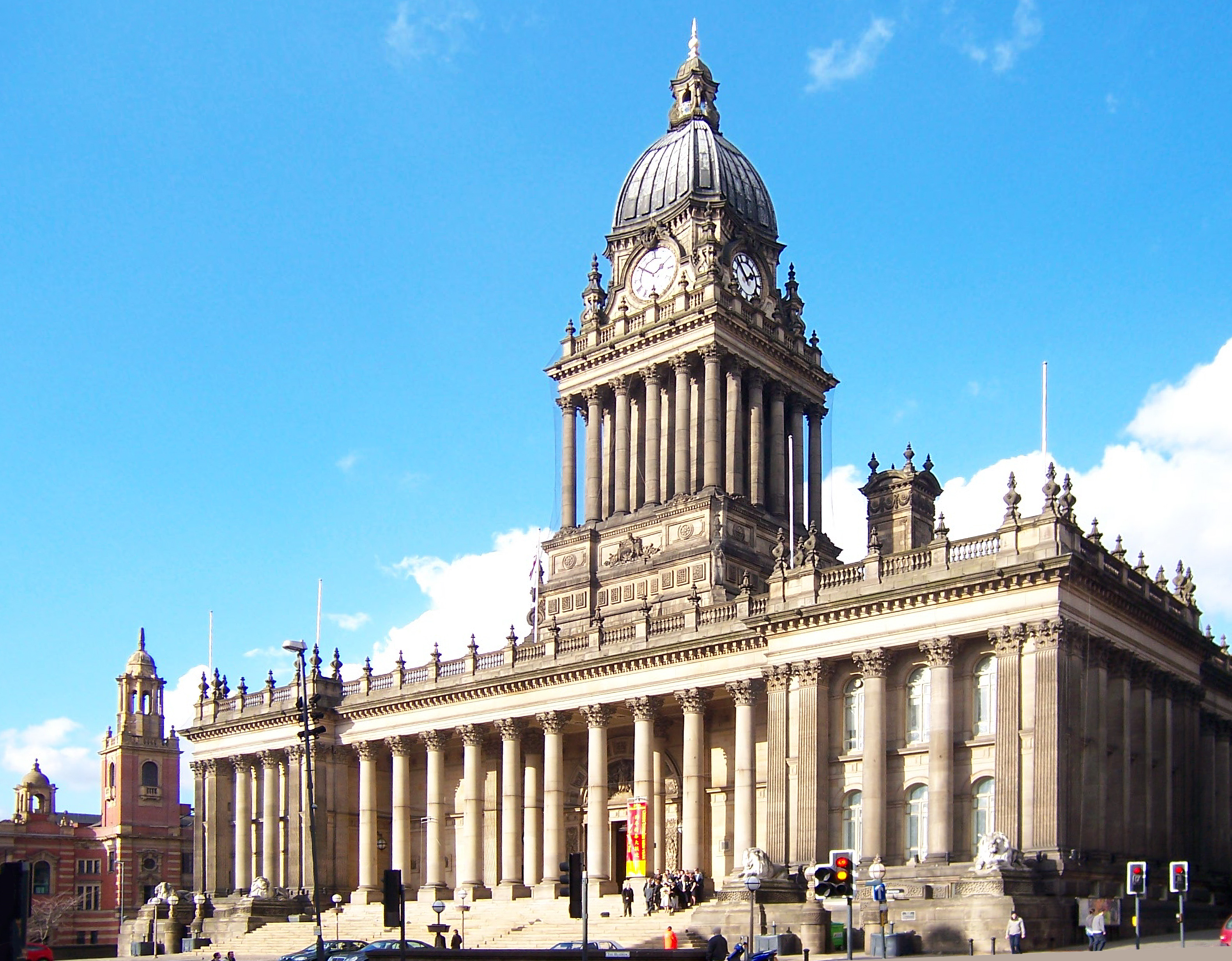
Several of the tracks were recorded live at Leeds Town Hall

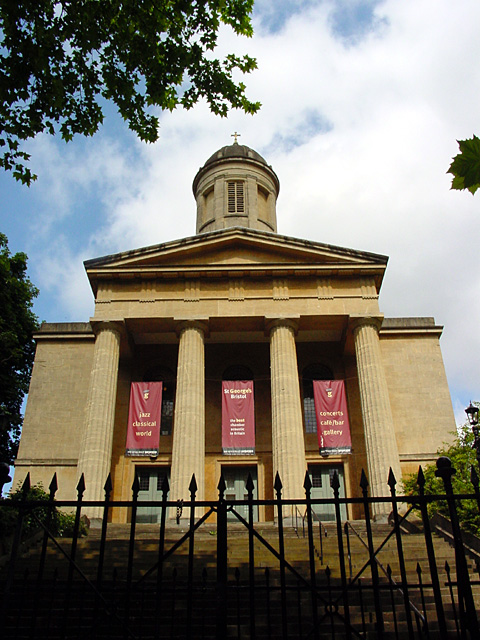
Three tracks were recorded live at St George's Bristol

1. "The King of Rome" (Dave Sudbury); recorded live at The Lowry, Salford for the BBC Folk Awards, 7:38
2. "Trimdon Grange Explosion" (Tommy Armstrong); recorded live at Leeds Town Hall 6:29
3. "The Father's Suite"; recorded live at the Derby Assembly Rooms. Voice of Jack Elliott taken from the BBC film Death of a Miner
  1. "George" (Adrian McNally) 3:26
  2. "The Happiness or Otherwise of Society (Jack Elliott)" (Adrian McNally) 1:27
  3. "The Father's Song" (Ewan McColl/Adrian McNally) 5:58
  4. "George II" (Max McNally/ Adrian McNally) 4:08
4. "My Lagan Love" (Traditional) 4:24; recorded at the Derby Assembly Rooms
5. "Queen of Hearts" (Roud 3195) (Traditional); recorded live at Leeds Town Hall 3:56
6. "Gan to the Kye" (Traditional); recorded live at Leeds Town Hall 5:49
7. "Felton Lonnin" (Roud 3166) (Traditional); recorded live at St George's Bristol 7:27
8. "Blue Bleezing Blind Drunk" (Traditional); recorded live at St George's Bristol 5:41
9. "Newcastle Lullaby" (Traditional); recorded live at Leeds Town Hall 6:12
10. "Gresford (The Miner's Hymn)" (Robert Saint); recorded live at St George's Bristol 4:30
11. "Fareweel Regality" (Terry Conway); recorded live at Leeds Town Hall 6:19

== Personnel ==
The Unthanks

- Rachel Unthank – voice
- Becky Unthank – voice
- Adrian McNally – piano, voice, drum on "King of Rome"
- Chris Price – voice (lead vocal on "Queen of Hearts"), drums on "Felton Lonnin", cymbals on "The King of Rome"
- Niopha Keegan – voice (lead vocal on "My Lagan Love")

performing with Brighouse and Rastrick Brass Band, conducted by Sandy Smith

== Production ==
The album was produced by Adrian McNally and mastered by Nigel Palmer at Lowland Masters in Saffron Walden, Essex.

== Album artwork ==
The illustration on the album cover is by Becky Unthank (who is the lead singer on "The King of Rome") and depicts the character Charlie from the song. The sleeve design was by Steven Wainwright and featured photography by Graham Whitmore, Ken Drew and Jeff Goldberg.
