= Mount the Air =

Studio album by the Unthanks
- Released: 9 February 2015
- Genre: Folk
- Length: 61:01
- Label: Rabble Rouser
- Producer: Adrian McNally

The Unthanks chronology
Songs from the Shipyards (2012)	Mount the Air (2015)	Archive Treasures 2005–2015 (2015)

Singles from Mount the Air
- 1. "Mount the Air" Released: 8 December 2014; 2. "Flutter" Released: 16 February 2015; 3. "Died for Love" Released: 8 June 2015

Professional ratings
Review scores
Source	Rating
AllMusic	4/5 stars
The Arts Desk	4/5 stars
The Australian	3.5/5 stars
The Daily Telegraph	5/5 stars
Financial Times	4/5 stars
The Guardian	4/5 stars
Hartlepool Mail	8/10 stars
The Irish Times	5/5 stars
MusicOMH	4/5 stars
The Observer	3/5 stars
Record Collector	4/5 stars
The Scotsman	4/5 stars
The Skinny	4/5 stars
Uncut	7/10 stars

Mount the Air is the eighth album by English folk group the Unthanks, released on 9 February 2015. It received five-star reviews in The Daily Telegraph and The Irish Times and four-star reviews in the Financial Times and The Guardian. It was the winner in the best album category in the 2016 BBC Radio 2 Folk Awards.

== Singles ==
Three tracks from the album were released as singles – the title track on 8 December 2014, "Flutter" on 16 February 2015 and "Died For Love" on 8 June 2015.

== Reception ==
Mount the Air received a five-starred review in The Daily Telegraph. Reviewer Helen Brown described the album as "a slow, swirling affair that mixes original material with traditional tales. Underpinned by McNally’s cool, fluid piano it’s simultaneously ancient and fresh."

Joe Breen, writing in The Irish Times, also gave the album five stars, describing the Unthanks' Mount The Air as "their most ambitious work" and saying that it "places them in the same league as the likes of The Gloaming and the Punch Brothers".

In a four-starred review for the Financial Times, David Honigmann said: "Once a bleak Northumbrian chamber folk outfit, the Unthanks have reinvented themselves on a symphonic scale, as witness the 10-minute title track, ushered in on harps and with an orchestration that recalls Gil Evans’s work for Miles Davis." Robin Denselow, in a four-starred review for The Guardian, said: "This is a return to the gentle melancholia of Last, and while there are fine vocals from the Unthank sisters, the dominant figure is Rachel’s husband, Adrian McNally, who plays keyboards and percussion, and produced and wrote much of the music... It’s a lush, often exquisite set". Alexis Petridis, also writing in The Guardian, said it was "ambitious and rooted in folk traditions, without being hard work for the listener". Duncan Haskell, reviewing the album for Songwriting magazine, described it as "a majestic tour de force of classical beauty". Mike Davies, for Folking.com, hailed it as "a masterpiece". The Hartlepool Mail said it was The Unthanks' "most rewarding record to date".

Teddy Jamieson, writing in the Sunday Herald, said: "The Unthanks return with an album that takes the folk tradition the sisters grew up on and sails it into wilder waters... Folk's storytelling tradition is still very much at the heart of this album. But what thrills here is the sense of scale at play in the music, the unrushed, easeful way the musicians stretch into songs, let them linger without ever overstaying their welcome. That and the earthy humanity of the sisters' voices."

In a four-starred review, Chris White, for MusicOMH, said that Mount the Air "continues The Unthanks’ journey away from the traditional north-east folk of their earlier albums towards a style that's uniquely their own. It's hard to think of another group anywhere who are creating music quite like this; still grounded in the sounds and spirit of their native region yet compositionally on a different planet to the pub back room strums and ceilidh jigs knocked out by most of their contemporaries." Also giving the album four stars, Thomas Ingham, writing for The Skinny, praised "the swelling and soaring arrangements of Adrian McNally, who manages to merge folk with the unease and medieval European gloom of recent records like Last Ex and the infamous In the Aeroplane Over the Sea". Michael Ainscoe, for Louder Than War, described the album as "a textured soundscape of splendour and sensitive intensity".

James Christopher Monger, in a four-starred review for AllMusic, described this Unthanks album as "a far more ambitious outing" than its predecessors. Simon Holland, for Folk Radio UK, said: "With two tracks at over 10 minutes, this was never going to be a short album, but... [it] does what great albums do, takes you on a journey, offers surprises, but gives you rewards on route, satisfying head and heart, with some moments of pure emotional static charge that make the hairs on the neck stand proud." Describing the album as "a floating, swirling, blend of folk, indie-rock, and jazz", Russ Coffey, in a four-starred review for The Arts Desk, said: "Adrian McNally's piano motifs... bring a Wyatt-like warmth. Similarly, Tom Arthur's free-form trumpet lines add a lovely sense of yearning... Mount The Air is, above all, Adrian McNally’s album and shines brightest where his arrangements are at their most ambitious. The title track is masterful: 10 minutes of a grieving Dorset folk song set against Arthur's laconic jazz horn licks". Aaron Lavery, reviewing the album for Drowned in Sound, said: "The Unthanks have never been gentle background music as some might expect, as they’re always drawn to the darker stories that they can dig up. On Mount The Air, those stories are matched by some sumptuous, confident music, and they sound all the better for it."

However, The Observer's Neil Spencer bucked the trend, giving the album three stars, and criticising the "ambitious but lumbering orchestration... Two instrumentals eschew the group’s strength; more voices please". And Jim Wirth, for Uncut, thought it "stylish, and extremely skillful, but a bit too much arr and not enough trad". Norman Miller, for Bearded magazine, said: "Less kow-towing to the glum side of a band of self-confessed 'miserable buggers' would have been good. As it is, we're left with one masterpiece track, a few good 'uns – and a few too many clunkers".

== Awards ==
Mount the Air was the winner in the best album category in the 2016 BBC Radio 2 Folk Awards.

== Track listing ==
1. "Mount the Air" (music by Adrian McNally; first verse based on "I'll Mount the Air on Swallows' Wings" (Roud 578); other words Adrian McNally/Becky Unthank) 10:34
2. "Madam" (Roud 542) (Traditional, arranged by Adrian McNally) 4:54
3. "Died for Love" (Roud 60) (Traditional, arranged by Adrian McNally) 3:48
4. "Flutter" (words by Becky Unthank; music by Becky Unthank/ Adrian McNally) 3:38
5. "Magpie" (Davey Dodds) 5:03
6. "Foundling" (Adrian McNally) 10:48
7. "Last Lullaby" (contains "Golden Slumbers" (traditional); additional words by Rachel Unthank; music traditional) 5:55
8. "Hawthorn" (Charles Causley/ Becky Unthank/ Adrian McNally) 4:22
9. "For Dad" (Niopha Keegan) 4:40
10. "The Poor Stranger" (Roud 414) (Traditional, arranged by Adrian McNally/ Rachel Unthank) 4:01
11. "Waiting" (Chris Price/Adrian McNally) 3:00

== Personnel ==
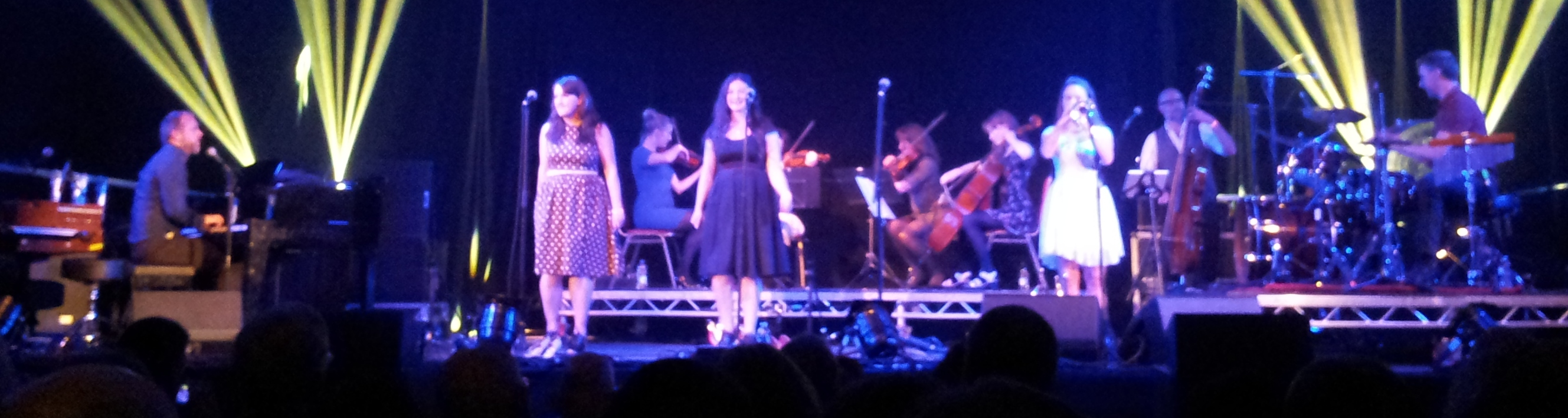
The Unthanks at Castle Armoury Drill Hall, Bury, Greater Manchester, on 17 October 2015, during their UK tour to promote their Mount the Air album

The Unthanks

- Rachel Unthank – voice
- Becky Unthank – voice
- Adrian McNally – piano, voice, celeste, kalimba, Fender Rhodes piano, chord organ, glockenspiel, Indian harmonium, percussion
- Niopha Keegan – quartet violin, solo fiddle, voice
- Chris Price – electric bass, guitar, piano tinkles on "Last Lullaby"

Additional musicians

- Lizzie Jones – trumpet, flugelhorn
- Martin Douglas – drums, percussion
- Dan Rogers – double bass
- Tom Arthurs – trumpet on "Mount the Air"
- Kathleen Ord – violin
- James Boyle – violin
- Gabriel Wait – cello
- Nick Byrne – cello
- Eilidh Gillespie – flute
- Esther Swift – harp

== Production ==
The album was recorded and produced by Adrian McNally between August 2012 and October 2014 at the Unthanks' studio in Northumberland. It was mastered by Denis Blackham at Skye Mastering. The album sleeve, designed by Steven Wainwright, incorporated photographs by Sarah Mason and artwork by Natalie Rae Reid.

== Charts ==
Chart performance for Mount the Air
Chart (2015)	Peak position
Scottish Albums (Official Charts)	40
UK Albums (Official Charts)	26
UK Independent Albums (Official Charts)	4
