= Songs from the Shipyards =

Soundtrack album by the Unthanks
- Released: 5 November 2012
- Genre: Folk
- Length: 41:21
- Label: Rabble Rouser
- Producer: Adrian McNally

The Unthanks chronology
The Unthanks with Brighouse and Rastrick Brass Band (2012)	Songs from the Shipyards (2012)	Mount the Air (2015)

Professional ratings
Review scores
Source	Rating
Daily Express	3/5 stars
The Independent	4/5 stars
Metro	4/5 stars
The Observer	4/5 stars
The Skinny	3/5 stars

Songs from the Shipyards, the seventh album by English folk group the Unthanks, was released on 5 November 2012. The album is designated Vol. 3 in The Unthanks' Diversions series and follows on from Vol. 1 (The Songs of Robert Wyatt and Antony & The Johnsons), released in November 2011 and Vol. 2 (The Unthanks with Brighouse and Rastrick Brass Band), released in July 2012.

It is a studio-recorded album of songs from a soundtrack, compiled by The Unthanks, which was first performed live in February 2011 at Newcastle upon Tyne’s Tyneside Cinema to accompany the showing of a documentary film by Richard Fenwick about the history of shipbuilding on the Tyne, Wear and Tees. (Note: A DVD of the film was included, alongside the compilation CD Archive Treasures 2005–2015, in The Unthanks' Memory Box package released in December 2015.) The album includes a cover version of Elvis Costello's "Shipbuilding" and songs written by Graeme Miles, Alex Glasgow, Archie Fisher, John Tams, Peter Bellamy and Jez Lowe, plus a centrepiece track, "The Romantic Tees", written by Adrian McNally.

The album received four-starred reviews in The Observer, The Independent and Metro.

== Reception ==
In a four-starred review The Observer's Neil Spencer described it as "a stark creation, using little more than piano, violin and voices" but said that its minimalism "lends poignancy to songs and poetry narrating the glory and grime of a vanished era". In another four-starred review, Andy Gill for The Independent referred to "the wistful blend of piano and ambient sounds" on "The Romantic Tees" and Becky Unthank's "soft timbre" and Rachel Unthank's "more ingenuous tone" on "Black Trade" and "A Great Northern River".

However, Jen Bowden for The Skinny felt that it "lacks the buzz of previous Unthanks albums... As a film soundtrack it is an emotive, image-ridden heart-breaker, but as an stand-alone listen it too easily fades, like its ghosts, into the background." And Martin Townsend, writing in the Daily Express, said that "Rachel and Becky Unthank’s admirably prolific output is beginning to count against them a little, as the delicacy of their earlier work gives way to a slightly clichéd earnestness."

Yet John Lewis, in a four-starred review for Metro, appreciated the Unthanks' sisters' "spine-tingling harmony". He said that The Unthanks "conjure a lament for a dying industry without recoursing to empty nostalgia or unearned sentimentality". Rosamund Woodroffe, for Bright Young Folk, admitted that the album can be "slightly more abstract than other release by The Unthanks" but said that "it is beautifully crafted, delicately put together and lovingly performed – a stunning testament to the shipyards".

== Track listing ==
No.	Title	Writer(s)	Length
1.	"The Romantic Tees (Prelude)"	Adrian McNally	1:33
2.	"A Great Northern River"	Graeme Miles	3:40
3.	"Black Trade"	Jez Lowe	4:36
4.	"Fairfield Crane"	Archie Fisher, Bobby Campbell	1:52
5.	"Big Steamers"	Rudyard Kipling, Peter Bellamy; arranged by The Unthanks	5:19
6.	"All in a Day"	Alex Glasgow	3:24
7.	"The Romantic Tees; I. The Romantic Tees; II. Tyne Slides By; III. The Looking Back Song"	Adrian McNally & Chris Price, Graeme Miles; Alex Glasgow; Johnny Handle	9:43
8.	"Shipbuilding"	Declan McManus, Clive Langer	3:46
9.	"Monkey Dung Man"	Jez Lowe	2:06
10.	"Taking on Men"	Jez Lowe	1:27
11.	"Only Remembered"	John Tams	3:55

Total album length = 41:21

== Personnel ==
The Unthanks

- Rachel Unthank – voice
- Becky Unthank – voice
- Niopha Keegan – violin, voice
- Adrian McNally – piano, harmonium, drum, voice
- Chris Price – guitar, bass, voice

Additional musicians

- Keith Hill – vibraphone on "The Romantic Tees"
- Julian Sutton – melodeon on "The Romantic Tees"

== Production ==
The album was produced by Adrian McNally and engineered by Adrian McNally and Chris D'Adda. The photographs used on the CD sleeve were by Keith Pattison.
