= Cruel Sister (Rachel Unthank and the Winterset album) =

Studio album by Rachel Unthank and the Winterset
- Released: 11 May 2005 (UK)
- Genre: Folk
- Length: 54:30
- Labels: Rabble Rouser – RR005 (UK); Cortex – CTX392CD (Australia), licensed to Shock Records
- Producer: Adrian McNally

Rachel Unthank and the Winterset chronology
Cruel Sister (2005)	The Bairns (2007)

Cruel Sister, the first album by English folk group Rachel Unthank and the Winterset (later to become the Unthanks) was released on 11 May 2005 and launched at Holmfirth Festival of Folk. Described by BBC Music as "an outstanding debut", it received support from a number of DJs on BBC Radio 2 and was subsequently awarded Folk Album of the Year by MOJO.

== Songs ==
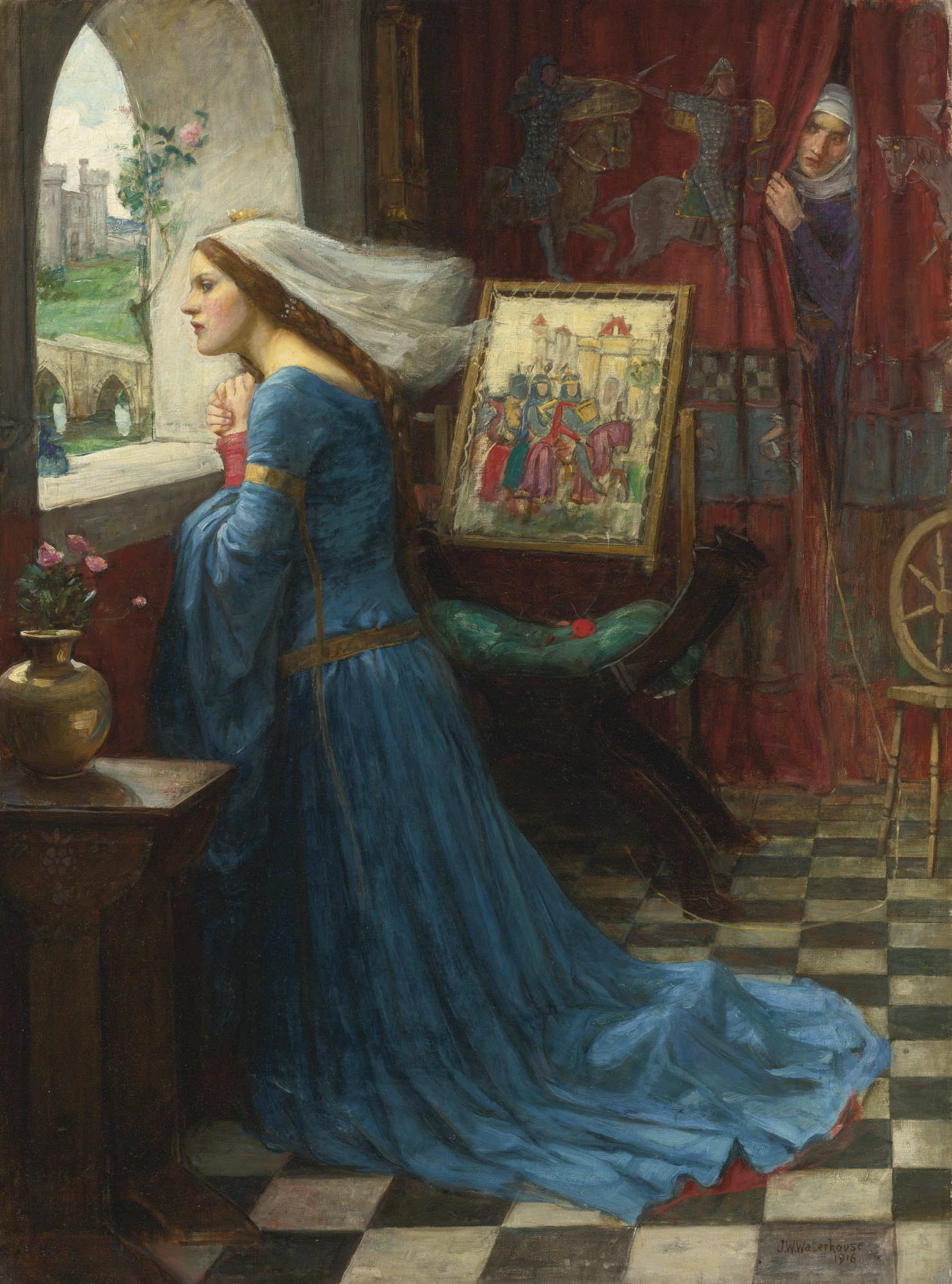
Rosamund Clifford pictured in a 1917 oil painting, Fair Rosamund by John William Waterhouse

Most of the tracks on the album are traditional folk songs.

"Cruel Sister", the song which provides the title for the album, is a traditional murder ballad (known in some versions as "The Twa Sisters"). It tells the story of the violent rivalry between two sisters for the love of a knight. One of the sisters murders her sibling, whose bones and hair are turned into a harp by a passing musician. The ballad was collected by Francis J. Child (Child 10) and is also listed in the Roud Folk Song Index.

"Fair Rosamund" is about Rosamund Clifford, a mistress of King Henry II of England. "The Greatham Calling on Song" is from the mummers' play which is performed in Greatham, County Durham every Boxing Day. "Raven Girl" is a traditional folk song with an additional verse written by Ester Watson of Hexham, Northumberland. "Bonny at Morn" was collected in the 19th century and published in 1882 in the Northumbrian Minstrelsy. "John Dead" is a sea shanty from the Windward Islands, collected by Roger D. Abrahams.

The album also includes an acclaimed cover version, sung by Becky Unthank, of Nick Drake's song "River Man".

== Track listing ==
1. "On a Monday Morning" (Cyril Tawney, arranged by Rachel and Becky Unthank/Belinda O'Hooley), 3:13
2. "January Man" (Dave Goulder, arranged by Rachel Unthank), 3:31
3. "Fair Rosamund" (Roud 3729) (Traditional, arranged by Rachel Unthank/Belinda O'Hooley), 2:57
4. "Cruel Sister" (Roud 8, Child 10) (Traditional, arranged by Rachel Unthank), 8:41
5. "Rap Her to Bank" (Roud 1786) (Traditional, arranged by Becky Unthank), 1:34
6. "Raven Girl" (Unknown/Ester Watson), 2:08
7. "Twenty Long Weeks" (Alex Glasgow, arranged by Rachel and Becky Unthank/Belinda O'Hooley), 3:20
8. "The Fair Flower of Northumberland" (Roud 25, Child 9) (Traditional, arranged by Rachel Unthank), 4:51
9. "The Greatham Calling on Song" (Roud 610) (Traditional, arranged by Rachel and Becky Unthank), 5:58
10. "Riverman" (Nick Drake, published by Island, arranged by Rachel and Becky Unthank), 5:01
11. "Bonny at Morn" (Roud 3064) (Traditional, arranged by Rachel Unthank), 4:14
12. "John Dead" (Traditional, arranged by Rachel and Becky Unthank), 3:47
13. "Troubled Waters" (Matt McGinn, arranged by Rachel and Becky Unthank), 5:06

Running time: 54:30

== Personnel ==
Rachel Unthank and the Winterset

- Rachel Unthank – voice, cello
- Becky Unthank – voice
- Belinda O'Hooley – piano, voice
- Jackie Oates – five-stringed viola, voice

Additional musicians

- Ben Green – voice
- Bryony Griffith – fiddle
- Kevin Hall – voice
- Will Hampson – melodeon
- Beth Hardy – voice
- Mike Hockenhull – banjo
- David Kosky – guitar
- Adrian McNally – guitar, voice
- Colin Mather – voice
- Rosie Morton – clàrsach (Celtic harp)
- Brian Pearce – voice
- Chris Sherburn – concertina
- Julian Sutton – melodeon
- George Unthank – voice
- Mat Unthank – voice
- Pat Unthank – voice
- John Winton – voice

The Keelers – George Unthank, Jim Mageean, Alan Fitzsimmons and Peter Wood – sing vocals on the introduction to "John Dead".

== Production and release ==
The album was produced and recorded by Adrian McNally and mixed and mastered at Panda Studios. The sound engineer was Oliver Knight. The album cover, which was illustrated by Becky Unthank, was designed by Steven Wainwright and incorporated photographs by Stephen Redfearn and Adrian McNally. The sleeve notes were by Rachel Unthank. The album was released in the United Kingdom on 11 May 2005 on Rabble Rouser Records.

== See also ==
- The Unthanks' 2015 compilation album Archive Treasures 2005–2015 which includes a live recording of "On a Monday Morning"
- Cruel Sister (Pentangle album)
- "River Man" (Nick Drake song)
