= Adrian McNally =

British songwriter, producer and composer

Adrian McNally is a record producer, a composer/songwriter and a musician with English folk group the Unthanks, which he also manages. As well as producing all of the Unthanks' albums he has produced the compilation album Harbour of Songs for which he was commissioned by The Stables in Milton Keynes as part of the London 2012 Cultural Olympiad, an album for Belinda O'Hooley and albums for Jonny Kearney & Lucy Farrell.

== Discography ==
=== EPs ===
- Jonny Kearney & Lucy Farrell: The North Farm Sessions (2010)

=== Albums ===
- Sherburn, Bartley & Scott's Last Night's Fun: Dubh (2001)
- Rachel Unthank and the Winterset: Cruel Sister (2005)
- Belinda O'Hooley: Music is My Silence (2005)
- Rachel Unthank and the Winterset: The Bairns (2007)
- Sherburn, Bartley & Scott's Last Night's Fun: Tempered (2007)
- The Unthanks: Here's the Tender Coming (2009)
- The Unthanks: Last (2011)
- Jonny Kearney & Lucy Farrell: Kite (2011)
- The Unthanks: The Songs of Robert Wyatt and Antony & the Johnsons (2011)
- Various artists: Harbour of Songs (2012)
- The Unthanks with Brighouse and Rastrick Brass Band (2012)
- The Unthanks: Songs from the Shipyards (2012)
- The Unthanks: Mount the Air (2015)
- The Unthanks: Archive Treasures 2005–2015 (2015)
- The Unthanks: The Songs and Poems of Molly Drake and The Songs and Poems of Molly Drake: Extras (2017)
- The Unthanks: Lines (2019)
- The Unthanks: Live And Unaccompanied (2020)
- The Unthanks: Sorrows Away (2022)
- The Unthanks: In Winter (2024)

== Broadcasts ==
In 2022 he gave his perspective on the composer Ralph Vaughan Williams in an "essay" broadcast on BBC Radio 3.

== Personal life ==
McNally grew up in a mining village near Barnsley, Yorkshire. He was married to, but is now divorced from, Rachel Unthank, singer with the Unthanks. They have two sons: George, born in 2011; and Arthur, born in 2014.
