= Lines (Unthanks album) =

Studio album by The Unthanks
- Released: 22 February 2019 (UK); pre-released on band's website on 22 November 2018
- Genre: Folk
- Label: Rabble Rouser Music
- Producer: Adrian McNally

The Unthanks chronology
| The Songs and Poems of Molly Drake (2017) | Lines (2019) | Live And Unaccompanied (2020) |

Professional ratings
Review scores
| Source | Rating |
|---|---|
| The Guardian | 4/5 stars |
| The Wee Review | 3/5 stars |

Lines (Parts One, Two & Three), a trilogy of albums with a poetic theme by English folk group the Unthanks, was pre-released on the band's website in November 2018, on 10" vinyl, CD and download, prior to their official release on 22 February 2019. They were made available as three separate albums and also packaged together in a slipcase.

Lines Part One: Lillian Bilocca is about the 1968 trawler disaster in Kingston upon Hull in which 58 men died. The songs were written by actor and writer Maxine Peake, with music by Adrian McNally. They were originally performed live by the Unthanks in The Last Testament of Lillian Bilocca, a theatrical event written by Peake.

Lines Part Two: World War One is about the First World War. Its songs were originally conceived for a live audio-visual project in 2014, A Time and a Place. One of the songs, "Roland and Vera", is adapted from letters between the writer Vera Brittain who was a Voluntary Aid Detachment nurse in the war, and her fiancé Roland Leighton, a poet, who died from a gunshot wound sustained on the war front.

Lines Part Three: Emily Brontë consists of ten poems by Emily Brontë, set to music by Adrian McNally. The songs were commissioned by the Brontë Society to mark the 200th anniversary of her birth.

== Reception ==
The album received a four-starred review in The Guardian from Neil Spencer. Also writing in The Guardian, Jude Rogers said that "The Unthanks continue to experiment ravenously and joyously".

However, Robert Peacock, in a three-starred review for The Wee Review, said that the Unthanks' voices, "solo or in harmony, remain one of the most captivating sounds in contemporary music and McNally’s measured, minor key piano balladry makes a great setting for them. But because it’s effectively soundtrack work, the charms of Lines are often understated and brief. Each of these [songs] is crying out to be experienced live, with verbal explanation, or accompanying their original inspirations. Cold, in recorded form, they’re harder to digest, and three courses of Lines are too much in one sitting."

== Track listing ==
=== Part One: Lillian Bilocca ===
- "Lillian (Prelude)" (Adrian McNally)
- "A Whistling Woman" (words: Maxine Peake / music: Adrian McNally and Becky Unthank)
- "The Sea is a Woman" (words: Maxine Peake / music: Adrian McNally)
- "Lonesome Cowboy" (Claude Bolling/ Jack Fishman)
- "Lillian II (The Banqueting Hall Scene)" (Adrian McNally)

=== Part Two: World War One ===
- "Roland and Vera" (Sam Lee, Nico Brown, Cosmo Sheldrake, Gwendolen Chatfield, Adrian McNally)
- "Everyone Sang" (Tim Dalling)
- "War Film" (words: Teresa Hooley / music: Adrian McNally)
- "Breakfast" (words: Wilfrid Wilson Gibson / music: Adrian McNally)
- "Suicide in the Trenches" (words: Siegfried Sassoon / music: Adrian McNally)
- "Socks" (words: Jessie Pope / music: Adrian McNally)

=== Part Three: Emily Brontë ===
- "The Parsonage" (words: Emily Brontë / music: Adrian McNally, arranged by Adrian McNally, Rachel Unthank and Becky Unthank)
- "Shall Earth No More Inspire Thee" (words: Emily Brontë / music: Adrian McNally, arranged by Adrian McNally, Rachel Unthank and Becky Unthank)
- "High Waving Heather" (words: Emily Brontë / music: Adrian McNally, arranged by Adrian McNally, Rachel Unthank and Becky Unthank)
- "She Dried Her Tears and They Did Smile" (words: Emily Brontë / music: Adrian McNally, arranged by Adrian McNally, Rachel Unthank and Becky Unthank)
- "The Night is Darkening Round Me" (words: Emily Brontë / music: Adrian McNally, arranged by Adrian McNally, Rachel Unthank and Becky Unthank)
- "Deep Deep Down in the Silent Grave" (words: Emily Brontë / music: Adrian McNally, arranged by Adrian McNally, Rachel Unthank and Becky Unthank)
- "Lines" (words: Emily Brontë / music: Adrian McNally, arranged by Adrian McNally, Rachel Unthank and Becky Unthank)
- "Remembrance" (words: Emily Brontë / music: Rachel Unthank / Adrian McNally, arranged by Adrian McNally, Rachel Unthank, Becky Unthank, based on a traditional tune)
- "O Evening Why" (words: Emily Brontë / music: Adrian McNally, arranged by Adrian McNally, Rachel Unthank and Becky Unthank)
- "I'm Happiest When Most Away" (words: Emily Brontë / music: Adrian McNally, arranged by Adrian McNally, Rachel Unthank and Becky Unthank)

== Personnel ==
- Rachel Unthank – voice
- Becky Unthank – voice
- Niopha Keegan – violin, voice, harmonium
- Adrian McNally – piano, voice
- Chris Price – double bass, electric bass, lap steel guitar, voice
- Martin Douglas – drums

== Production ==
The album's cover artwork is by Natalie Rae Reid.
