= The Songs and Poems of Molly Drake =

2017 album by The Unthanks

Studio album by the Unthanks
- Released: 26 May 2017
- Genre: Folk
- Labels: Rabble Rouser (UK) – RRM016 and RRM016LP
- Producer: Adrian McNally

The Unthanks chronology
| Archive Treasures 2005–2015 (2015) | The Songs and Poems of Molly Drake (2017) | The Songs and Poems of Molly Drake: Extras (2017) |

Professional ratings
Review scores
| Source | Rating |
|---|---|
| Financial Times | 3/5 stars |
| The Guardian | 3/5 stars |
| The Independent | 5/5 stars |
| MusicOMH | 4/5 stars |
| The Observer | 3/5 stars |

The Songs and Poems of Molly Drake: Extras

Studio album by the Unthanks
- Released: 26 May 2017
- Genre: Folk
- Labels: Rabble Rouser (UK) – RRM017 and RRM017EP
- Producer: Adrian McNally

The Unthanks chronology
| The Songs and Poems of Molly Drake (2017) | The Songs and Poems of Molly Drake: Extras (2017) | Lines (2019) |

The Songs and Poems of Molly Drake is an album by English folk group the Unthanks. It was pre-released on the band's website in April 2017, prior to its official release on 26 May 2017, and received a five-starred review in The Independent. It contains recordings of songs and poems written by Molly Drake, the mother of Nick Drake, and recitations of Molly's poems by her daughter Gabrielle Drake. An album of further poems and songs, The Songs and Poems of Molly Drake: Extras, was released simultaneously.

Both albums are designated Vol. 4 in the Unthanks' Diversions series and follow on from Vol. 1 (The Songs of Robert Wyatt and Antony & The Johnsons), released in November 2011, Vol. 2 (The Unthanks with Brighouse and Rastrick Brass Band), released in July 2012 and Vol. 3 (Songs from the Shipyards), released in November 2012.

== Reception ==
The Songs and Poems of Molly Drake received a five-starred review in The Independent. Reviewer Andy Gill said: "Adrian McNally's subtle arrangements draw the maximum impact from Rachel and Becky Unthanks' distinctive intonations... the most moving piece here is surely 'I Remember', an account of a crumbling relationship aching with regret."

However, David Honigmann in the Financial Times was less complimentary. In a three-starred review he said: "Not every song is weighty enough to carry the full force of the sisters' singing, and some of the dappled pastoral feels like outtakes from Virginia Astley's chamber folk albums".

Neil Spencer, in a three-starred review for The Observer, described Molly Drake's songs, "often as brooding and melancholic as her son's" as "a natural fit for the Unthanks' poignant sibling harmonies".

Jude Rogers, in a three-starred review for The Guardian, said: "Fans of the girlish northern voices of sisters Becky and Rachel Unthank, and the soft, shining piano of Adrian McNally, will adore it; others might get lost in the whispery sweetness of Dream Your Dreams and Never Pine for the Old Love, longing for more gravel and grit. When it comes, at the end of the subtly heartbreaking, I Remember, and the sombre Set Me Free, it hits".

== Songs ==
All the songs were written by Molly Drake and – except for two ("Bird in the Blue" and "Soft Shelled Crabs") – had previously been recorded by her.

== Track listing ==
1. "What Can a Song Do to You?" (with poem: "Lost Grief")
2. "Dream Your Dreams"
3. "Martha"
4. "How Wild the Wind Blows"
5. "Little Weaver Bird"
6. "Bird in the Blue" (with poem: "Lost Blue")
7. "The Road to the Stars" (with poem: "Warning to Heroes")
8. "Set Me Free" (with poem: "Escape Me Now")
9. "Woods in May"
10. "I Remember"
11. "Never Pine for the Old Love"
12. "The Shell"
13. "Soft Shelled Crabs"
14. "Do You Ever Remember?" (with poem: "Time")
15. "The First Day" (with poem: "A Prayer for Love")

The Songs and Poems of Molly Drake: Extras

1. "Dog on a Wheel"
2. "Happiness"
3. "Two Worlds"
4. "Night Is My Friend"
5. "Primary Colour"
6. "Poor Mum"
7. "Well It Is Finished"
8. "Love Isn't a Right"

== Personnel ==
- Gabrielle Drake – spoken word

The Unthanks

- Rachel Unthank – voice
- Becky Unthank – voice
- Adrian McNally – piano, voice
- Chris Price – double bass, guitar, voice
- Niopha Keegan – violin, viola, voice

Additional musicians

- Faye MacCalman – clarinet, tenor saxophone
- Martin Douglas – cymbals on "Little Weaver Bird"

== See also ==
- Family Tree (2007) – home recordings of songs performed by Nick Drake, in a compilation album which also includes two original songs performed by Nick's mother, Molly
- Molly Drake (2013) – compilation album of songs performed by Molly Drake
