= In Winter (Unthanks album) =

Studio album by the Unthanks
- Released: 29 November 2024
- Genre: Folk
- Label: Rabble Rouser Music
- Producer: Adrian McNally

The Unthanks chronology
Sorrows Away (2022)	In Winter (2024)

Singles from In Winter
- 1. "Dear Companions" Released: 21 October 2024

Professional ratings
Review scores
Source	Rating
Americana UK	7/10 stars
The Arts Desk	4/5 stars
Financial Times	4/5 stars
Spiral Earth	4/5 stars
The Times	5/5 stars

In Winter is a double album by English folk group the Unthanks, released on 29 November 2024. It received a four-starred review in the Financial Times and a five-starred review in The Times.

== Personnel ==
The Unthanks

- Rachel Unthank – voice
- Becky Unthank – voice
- Niopha Keegan – violin, viola, voice
- Adrian McNally – pianos, harmonium, voice, drums
- Chris Price – voice, double bass, electric bass

Additional musicians

- Dan Rogers – double bass, electric bass, celeste, voice
- Faye MacCalman – saxophone, clarinet, voice
- Will Hammond – vibraphone, jingle bells, drums, harmonium, celeste, voice
- Jane Nossek – violin
- Chrissie Slater – viola
- Gabriel Waite – cello

== Charts ==
Chart performance for In Winter
Chart (2024–2025)	Peak position
Scottish Albums (Official Charts)	29
UK Album Downloads (Official Charts)	18
UK Folk Albums (Official Charts)	2
UK Independent Albums (Official Charts)	3
