= Sorrows Away =

Studio album by the Unthanks
- Released: 14 October 2022
- Genre: Folk
- Length: 56:58
- Label: Rabble Rouser Music
- Producer: Adrian McNally

The Unthanks chronology
Live and Unaccompanied (2020)	Sorrows Away (2022)	In Winter (2024)

Professional ratings
Aggregate scores
Source	Rating
Metacritic	88/100
Review scores
Source	Rating
Financial Times	5/5 stars
The Observer	4/5 stars
The Scotsman	4/5 stars

Sorrows Away is an album by English folk group the Unthanks. It was released on 14 October 2022 and received four-star reviews in The Observer and The Scotsman and a five-star review in the Financial Times.

== Critical reception ==
Sorrows Away was met with "universal acclaim" reviews from critics. At Metacritic, which assigns a weighted average rating out of 100 to reviews from mainstream publications, it received an average score of 88, based on four reviews.

== Track listing ==
No.	Title	Length
1.	"The Great Silkie of Sule Skerry"	7:45
2.	"The Sandgate Dandling Song"	8:49
3.	"The Old News"	3:56
4.	"The Royal Blackbird"	4:02
5.	"The Isabella Colliery Coke Ovens"	4:05
6.	"The Bay of Fundy"	4:29
7.	"The Month of January (Uncle Rat)"	4:38
8.	"My Singing Bird"	7:05
9.	"Waters of Tyne"	2:58
10.	"Sorrows Away (Love Is Kind)"	9:11
Total length:		56:58

== Charts ==
Chart (2022)	Peak position
Scottish Albums (Official Charts)	9
UK Albums (Official Charts)	26
UK Album Downloads (Official Charts)	22
UK Folk Albums (Official Charts)	1
UK Independent Albums (Official Charts)	4
