= The Songs of Robert Wyatt and Antony & the Johnsons =

Live album by the Unthanks
- Released: 28 November 2011
- Recorded: 8 and 9 December 2010 at the Union Chapel, Islington, London
- Length: 67:44
- Labels: Rabble Rouser RRM009 (UK); Rough Trade Records RTRADCD636 (UK/USA); High Note Records HN925CD (Taiwan)
- Producer: Adrian McNally

The Unthanks chronology
Last (2011)	The Songs of Robert Wyatt and Antony & the Johnsons (2011)	The Unthanks with Brighouse and Rastrick Brass Band (2012)

Professional ratings
Review scores
Source	Rating
AllMusic	4/5 stars
The Guardian	4/5 stars
The Independent on Sunday	3/5 stars
MusicOMH	4/5 stars
The Observer	4/5 stars
Pop Matters	7/10 stars
Rolling Stone	4.5/5 stars

The Songs of Robert Wyatt and Antony & the Johnsons, the fifth album by English folk group the Unthanks and the first to be recorded live, was released on 28 November 2011. Its extended title is: Diversions Vol. 1: The Songs of Robert Wyatt and Antony & the Johnsons: Live from the Union Chapel, London.

The album, which consists entirely of songs by Robert Wyatt and by Antony Hegarty (now known as Anohni) of Antony and the Johnsons, was recorded at the Union Chapel, Islington, London, on 8 and 9 December 2010. It received a 4.5-starred review in Rolling Stone, four-starred reviews in The Guardian and The Observer and four-starred ratings from AllMusic and musicOMH.

== Reception ==
David Fricke, in a 4.5-starred review for Rolling Stone magazine, said there is "a silvery deceptive spine running through the sisters' Earth-angel voices". In a four-starred review, Neil Spencer of The Observer called the album "[a] triumphant excursion", adding that "...the Unthanks' intertwining voices – cadent, mournful, tender – never falter and the between-songs banter ('There will be clog dancing!') grounds an ethereal atmosphere". Robin Denselow, in a four-starred review for The Guardian, described the album as "a thoughtful, delicate and bravely original tribute to two fine contemporary songwriters". Reviewing the album for BBC Music, Martin Aston was struck by "hearing You Are My Sister sung to each other by sisters in blood as well as spirit, the arrangement and tone touching rather than cloying".

Writing in The Independent on Sunday, Nick Coleman said that "The Hegarty songs respond slightly better to the treatment than do Wyatt's, with the exception of 'Sea Song'." In a four-starred review for musicOMH, Chris White said: "In a largely flawless set, the Antony & The Johnsons songs in particular are luminously beautiful, perfectly suited to the sisters’ passionate, breathy vocals and McNally's elegant arrangements" but felt that the Unthanks are "at their best when providing a mixed palette of the centuries-old music of their native county and their own unique takes on the work of some of today’s most interesting performers. Just focusing on the latter, they’re marginally less interesting."

In a four-starred review for AllMusic, James Christopher Monger described it as "one of the more riveting and idiosyncratic tribute albums of the past ten years". Alex Young, reviewing the album for Consequence of Sound, said: "Rachel and Becky Unthank convey the intensity of Antony and the Johnsons, as well as Wyatt’s weariness. This kind of tribute doesn’t come about often enough, and they’ve nailed it, letting the lyricism and emotionality ring out".

== Track listing ==
Antony and the Johnsons songs

1. "Bird Guhl" (Antony Hegarty) from I Am a Bird Now (3:57)
2. "Man Is the Baby" (Antony Hegarty) from I Am a Bird Now (5:43)
3. "You Are My Sister" (Antony Hegarty) from I Am a Bird Now (5:56)
4. "For Today I Am a Boy" (Antony Hegarty) from I Am a Bird Now (4:06)
5. "Paddy's Gone" (Antony Hegarty) from I Am a Bird Now (4:13)
6. "Spiralling" (Antony Hegarty) from I Am a Bird Now (4:41)

Robert Wyatt songs

1. "Stay Tuned" (Anja Garbarek) from Comicopera (4:43)
2. "Dondestan" (Robert Wyatt) from Dondestan (Revisited) (3:18)
3. "Lullaby for Hamza" (Robert Wyatt/Alfreda Benge) from Cuckooland (3:44)
4. "Lisp Service" (Hugh Hopper/Robert Wyatt) from Dondestan (Revisited) (3:11)
5. "Free Will and Testament" (Wyatt/Kramer) from Shleep (5:03)
6. "Out of the Blue" (Wyatt/Elfriede Ellidge) from Comicopera (4:11)
7. "Cuckoo Madame" (Wyatt/Benge) from Cuckooland (5:13)
8. "Sea Song" (Wyatt) from Rock Bottom (6:59)
9. "Forest" (excerpt) (Wyatt/Benge) from Cuckooland (2:51)

Total album length = 1:07:44

== Personnel ==
The Unthanks

- Rachel Unthank – voice, feet, (Note: Clog dancing – and the sound that the feet make when they do it – is integral to the Unthanks' stage act and to the recording of some of their songs. They list "feet", alongside vocals and instruments, in the album's sleeve notes.) dulcitone
- Becky Unthank – voice, feet
- Adrian McNally – piano on Robert Wyatt set, drums on Antony set, harmonium, voice
- Chris Price – drums on Robert Wyatt set, electric bass on Antony set, voice
- Niopha Keegan – violin, accordion, voice

Additional musicians

- Ros Stephen – violin, voice
- Becca Spencer – viola, voice
- Jo Silverston – cello, voice
- Lizzie Jones – trumpet, voice
- Dean Ravera – double bass
- Jonny Kearney – piano on Antony set

== Arrangements ==
- Strings on Antony set transcribed by Niopha Keegan
- Strings on "Stay Tuned" by Niopha Keegan
- Strings on "Lisp Service" by Jo Silverston
- Strings on "Out of the Blue" by Becca Spencer and Lizzie Jones

== Production and design ==
The album, which was recorded live at the Union Chapel, Islington, London on 8 and 9 December 2010, was mixed and produced by Adrian McNally and mastered by Denis Blackham. The tri-fold album cover, designed by Steven Wainwright, incorporates illustrations by Becky Unthank and photographs by Mark Winpenny.
