= Graeme Miles =

English folk singer and songwriter

Graeme Miles (1935 – 29 March 2013) was an English folk singer and songwriter based in Middlesbrough. Born in Greenwich, London, he grew up in Teesside and studied at West Hartlepool Art School. He became enamored with folk music and with the Teesside area in his teens, and upon realizing there was little to no folk music about Teesside itself, he set out to create it. He worked at the Middlesbrough Museum for a time, but gave up that comfortable job to work in the foundries and factories in order to better understand his community and what he was writing about. His mission was to find the beauty in the traditionally "ugly" and overlooked Northeast of England. Despite never officially releasing any recordings himself, many artists have sung and recorded Miles' songs, his more famous compositions including "Sea Coal", "Jack Ironside," "Blue Sunset," and "Ring of Iron".

During late 1982 and early 1983, Teesside Folk Group The Wilson Family, of Billingham, collaborated with Miles to produce their debut album, "Horumarye", the first album dedicated solely to Miles' works.

In 2001, Fellside Records released a full album of Miles' songs by Martyn Wyndham-Read with No Man's Band. Wyndham-Read had previously recorded a number of Miles' songs on other releases, and has continued to since. Miles himself wrote the sleeve notes for the album, giving commentary on each of the songs and explaining how, in preparation for the selection, he looked out old reels of tape- the album's 15 tracks coming from a collection of 'perhaps two hundred pieces'. Among the chosen songs is "Over Yonder Banks", previously recorded by Ray Fisher for her 1981 album, Willie's Lady.

Miles' "A Great Northern River" was included on The Unthanks' 2012 album Songs from the Shipyards. They also performed his song "Sad February" on their 2007 album Here's the Tender Coming.

The English folk group The Young'uns champion the folk music of Northeast, with a special interest in reviving the music of Graeme Miles. They have recorded several of his songs, such as "The Running Fox" and "Jack Ironside."

The Graeme Miles Bursary, established in his memory, is open to artists and groups between the ages of 18 and 25 who are based in the Northeast of England. Funded by the proceeds of concerts organised by The Unthanks, it is administered by the English Folk Dance and Song Society. The Rachel Hamer Band received a bursary in 2016.

In 2025, a biography of Miles was published by McGeary Media. Shadows & Whispers: Graeme Miles Remembered, by Ailsa MacKenzie, includes interviews with many of his friends and contemporaries and a selection of his songs with musical notation.
