= Jonny Kearney & Lucy Farrell =

English folk duo

Jonny Kearney & Lucy Farrell were a contemporary English folk duo. Although they played some traditional songs, most of the songs they sang were their own compositions influenced by the folk tradition, but also songs by other artists such as Bob Dylan, Tom Waits, Cole Porter, Brian Wilson and The Beatles.

Kearney provided vocals, guitar and piano; Farrell played fiddle, viola and saw and vocals. Together they produced a sparse sound described by The Guardian as "delicate, thoughtful and intimate".

== Career ==
Kearney is from Hexham in Northumberland and Farrell from Maidstone in Kent. They met whilst studying on Newcastle University's Folk and Traditional Music course in 2005, where Kearney was awarded the Alan Hull prize for songwriting. Having gigged at folk clubs and festivals, including Green Man, End of the Road and Cambridge Folk Festival, they came to the attention of fellow North East England folk musicians The Unthanks. Adrian McNally from The Unthanks produced their first six-song EP entitled The North Farm Sessions after the farm belonging to Rachel Unthank and Adrian McNally, where it was recorded. The EP, released in May 2010 on Rabble Rouser Records, comprised largely their own compositions with a rearrangement of one traditional song, and met with effusive reviews from The Guardian, Uncut, Q Magazine and MTV. Tracks from the EP were featured on BBC Radio 1, BBC Radio 2, BBC Radio 3 and BBC 6 Music with a Campfire Special session recorded for Rob da Bank's Radio 1 show in October 2010.

Support slots on tours by The Unthanks and Bellowhead followed in 2009/10, with favourable reviews. In 2010 Jonny Kearney & Lucy Farrell were nominated for the BBC Radio 2 Folk Awards' Horizon award which is given to best emerging artists. They were also nominated for an award for best duo in the 2012 BBC Radio 2 Folk Awards.

Their first full-length album, Kite, also recorded at North Farm, was released on 10 October 2011. The intimacy of the duo's sound is still at the heart of the record, but is fleshed out at times by Adrian McNally (Unthanks) on piano, Dean Ravera on double bass, Chris Hibbard on trombone, Paul Ruddick on saxophone and clarinet and Peter Tickell (Peatbog Fairies, Sting, Kathryn Tickell Band) on fiddle.

The duo also contributed to a range of other people's work, including viola and vocals from Farrell on Emily Portman's album The Glamoury. Farrell is also part of the Emily Portman Trio and The Furrow Collective (the Trio joined by Alasdair Roberts). Kearney played piano on The Unthanks' autumn 2011 tour of Robert Wyatt and Antony Hegarty songs.

== Discography ==
The North Farm Sessions EP

1. "Hares on the Mountain" (Roud 329) (Traditional, arranged by Farrell/Kearney)
2. "Sweetheart" (Kearney, arranged by Farrell/Kearney/Rogers)
3. "Benjamin Brown" (Kearney, arranged by Farrell/Kearney)
4. "To a Boy" (Farrell, arranged by Farrell/Kearney)
5. "Letters to Lenore" (Kearney, arranged by Farrell/Kearney)
6. "Lullaby" (Kearney, arranged by Farrell/Kearney)

Kite album

1. "There’s a Disease" (Kearney)
2. "Just Like the Old Days" (Kearney)
3. "Winter Got Lost" (Farrell)
4. "Green Leaved Trees" (Kearney)
5. "Down in Adairsville" (Traditional, arranged by Kearney/Farrell/McNally)
6. "I Write this Note" (Kearney)
7. "Stand Up Show" (Kearney)
8. "A Dream" (Kearney)
9. "Call Yourself a Friend of Mine" (Kearney)
10. "Swing Low" (Kearney)
11. "Peggy Gordon" (Traditional, arranged by Kearney/Farrell/McNally)
12. "Jack and Jill" (Kearney)

"Green Leaved Trees" digital single

1. "Green Leaved Trees" (Kearney)
2. "Winter Got Lost" (Farrell)
3. "Letters to Lenore" (Kearney, arranged by Farrell/Kearney) (recorded live in Newcastle, 2 October 2011)
4. "No one can love you"(Traditional, arranged by Kearney/Farrell/McNally)
