= Archive Treasures 2005–2015 =

Compilation album by the Unthanks
- Released: 11 December 2015 (UK)
- Genre: Folk music
- Length: 76:00
- Label: Rabble Rouser (UK) – RRM015; Cadiz (Europe) – 8473531
- Producer: Adrian McNally

The Unthanks chronology
Mount the Air (2015)	Archive Treasures 2005–2015 (2015)	The Songs and Poems of Molly Drake (2017)

Professional ratings
Review scores
Source	Rating
Contactmusic.com	4/5 stars
Financial Times	4/5 stars
Music News	4/5 stars

Archive Treasures 2005–2015, the ninth album by English folk group the Unthanks, was released on 11 December 2015. It contains archive recordings, most of them previously unreleased, spanning the group's 10-year history of recording. These include live tracks, demos and outtakes and BBC session tracks. A recording from 2000 of the Unthank Family Band also appears on the album.

== Memory Box ==
Although also available as a stand-alone item, the album was initially released as part of a limited edition package called Memory Box, which also contained a Christmas 7" single (the first Unthanks single to be issued in this format) and other items to commemorate the band's 10th anniversary.

== Track listing ==
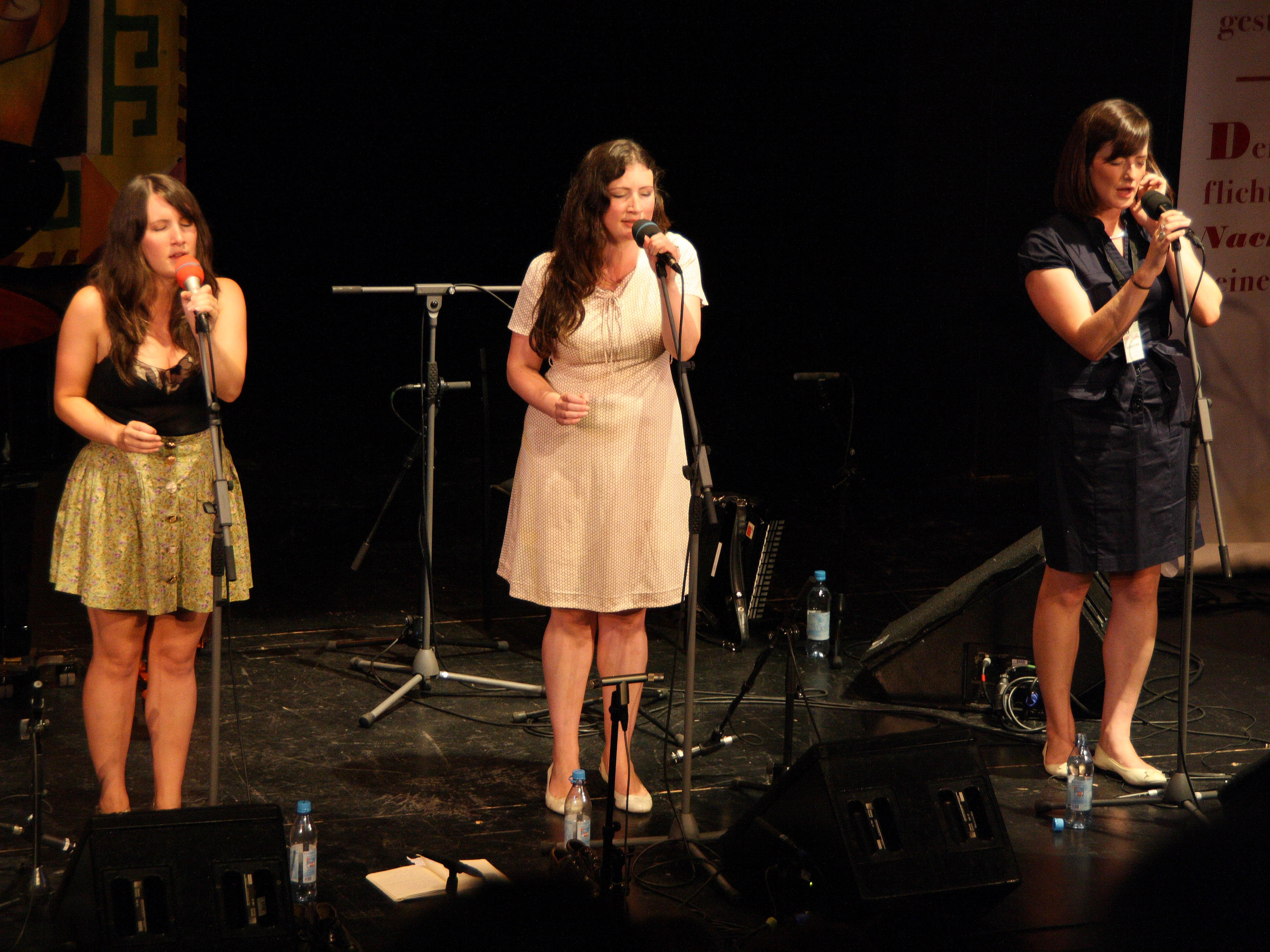
Becky and Rachel Unthank with Niopha Keegan at TFF Rudolstadt, 2009

1. "2000 Miles" (Chryssie Hynde) (the Unthanks' 2015 Christmas single), 2.04
2. "On a Monday Morning" (Cyril Tawney) (live from TFF Rudolstadt, Germany, 2009), 4.48
3. "I Wish, I Wish" (Roud 60) (Traditional) (live from Melbourne, Australia, 2008), 6.54
4. "Blue Bleezing Blind Drunk" (Roud 6333) (Traditional) (live from Holywell Music Room, Oxford, 2008), 5.25
5. "Close the Coalhouse Door" (Alex Glasgow) (live from Tyne Theatre and Opera House, Newcastle upon Tyne, 2011), 7.55
6. "Alifib/Alifie" (Robert Wyatt) (live from Brighton Dome, 2012), 9.27
7. "The Gallowgate Lad" (lyrics: Joe Wilson; music: traditional (tune: "Sally Grey")) (live from Tyne Theatre and Opera House, Newcastle upon Tyne, 2011), 5.53
8. "Felton Lonnin" (Roud 3166) (Traditional) (from BBC Radio 1 session on Rob Da Bank's programme), 5.08
9. "Tar Barrel in Dale" (George Unthank) (performed live on Radcliffe and Maconie, BBC Radio 2, 23 December 2008), 3.53
10. "Queen of Hearts" (Roud 3195) (Traditional) (alternative demo, 2009), 5.27
11. "Sexy Sadie" (Lennon/McCartney) (from MOJO Presents the White Album Recovered, MOJO 179, 2008), 6.27
12. "A Dream of a Tree in a Spanish Graveyard" (lyrics: Ian McMillan; music: Adrian McNally) (from Harbour of Songs, The Stables CD001, 2012), 3.02
13. "Oak, Ash & Thorn" (lyrics: Rudyard Kipling; music: Peter Bellamy) (from the Oak Ash Thorn tribute album, Folk Police FPR 003, 2011), 6.18
14. The Unthank Family Band (recorded at Hartlepool Folk Club, 2000), 3.59
