= Queen of Hearts (Joan Baez song) =

"Queen of Hearts" (Roud 3195) is a song sung by, among others, Joan Baez and Martin Carthy.

The lyrics are from a traditional song.

To the Queen of Hearts is the Ace of Sorrow,
He's here today and he's gone tomorrow.
Young men are plenty but sweethearts few;
If my love leave me, what shall I do?

== Joan Baez version ==
It was released as the B-Side of Baez' "Farewell, Angelina", a Bob Dylan song, on Fontana Records in 1965. In The Joan Baez Ballad Book it is said to be traditional, though elsewhere erroneously attributed to David Coverdale and Micky Moody.
