= Dulcitone =

Keyboard instrument

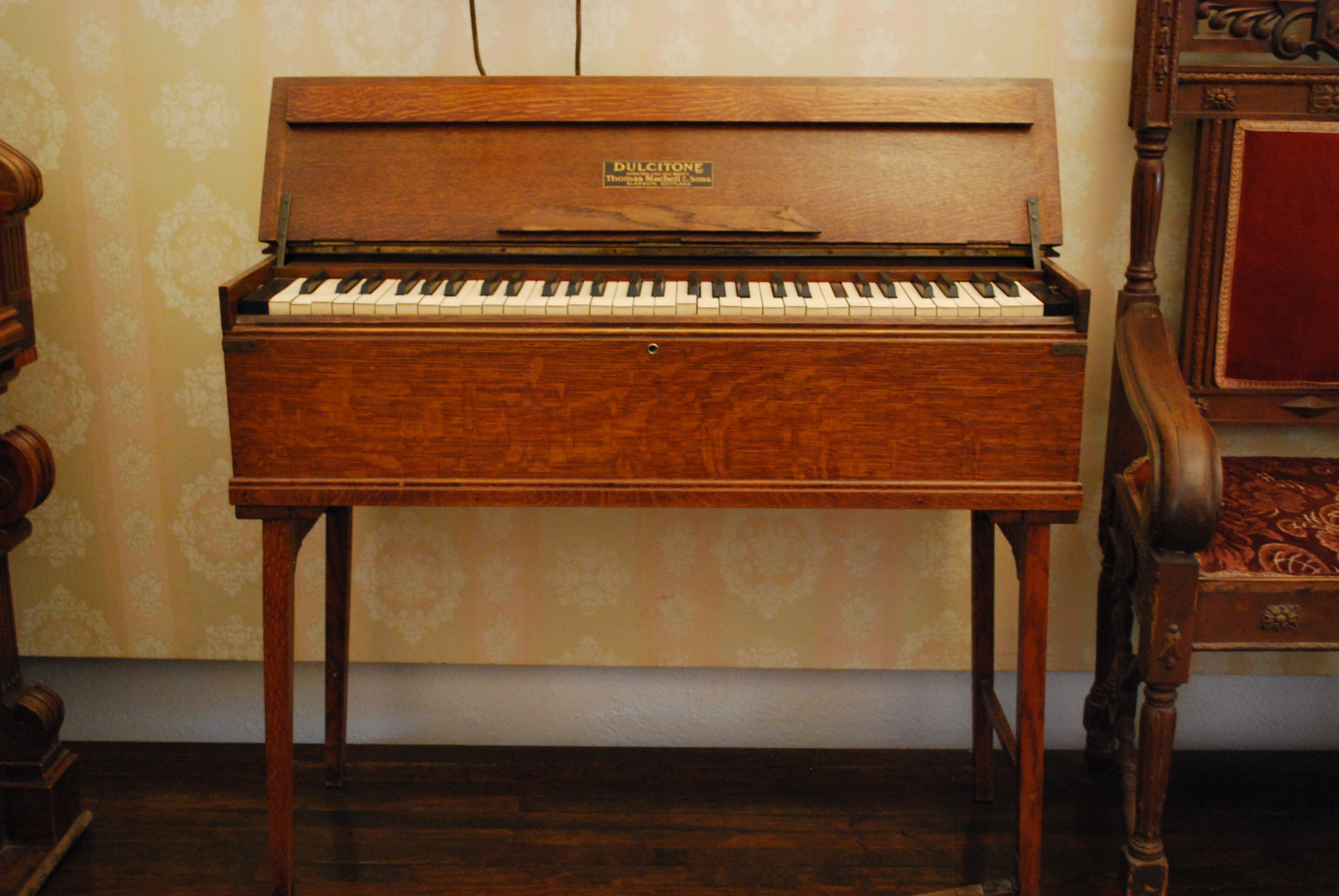
Dulcitone, display at the Palace of Cortés, Cuernavaca, Mexico

A dulcitone is a keyboard instrument in which sound is produced by a range of tuning forks, which vibrate when struck by felt-covered hammers activated by the keyboard. The instrument was designed by Thomas Machell of Glasgow in the 1860s, at the same time as Victor Mustel's organologically synonymous typophone, and manufactured by the firm of Thomas Machell & Sons during the late nineteenth and early twentieth centuries.

Most of the early models are tuned to sharp pitch, or the diapason normal of A435. Some of the late models use an action suspended on a system of leaf springs, which is considerably quieter than that illustrated.

== Description ==
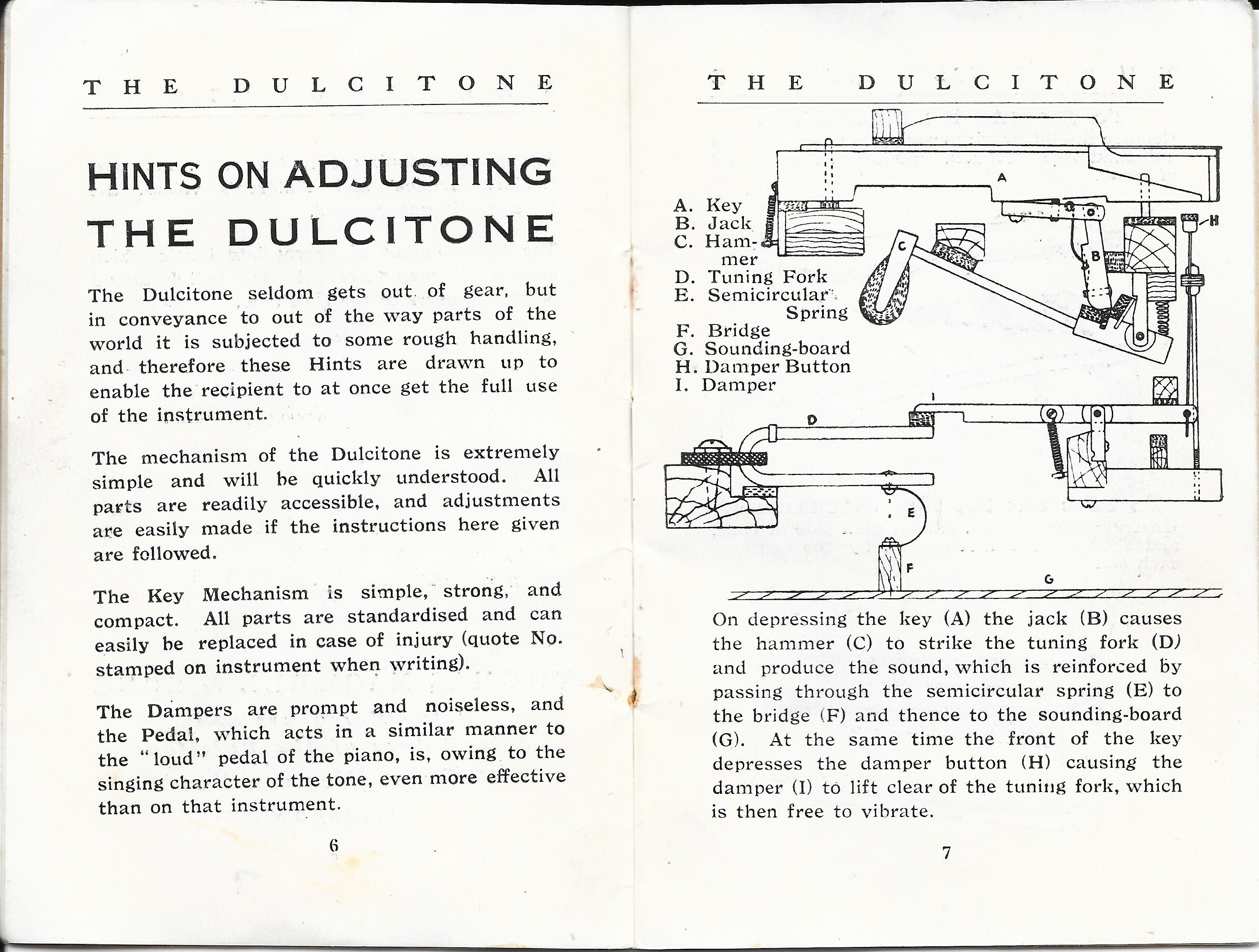
Diagram showing layout of action

The dulcitone is a transposing instrument of the idiophone class; it speaks an octave higher than the standard (eight foot pitch) written pitch. It has a five octave written range from AA to a3 (sounding range from A to a4).

A significant feature of the dulcitone was its portability, a product of its lightweight and compact construction and the fact that the tuning forks (unlike, for instance, the strings of a piano) were not prone to going out of tune. However, the volume produced is extremely limited, and the dulcitone's part is frequently substituted by a glockenspiel.

Two pieces scored for the dulcitone are Vincent d'Indy's Song of the Bells (1888) and Percy Grainger's "The Power of Rome and the Christian Heart" (1943).

In 1911 there were 3 versions listed: Style B, with 3½ octaves in solid mahogany (polished Chippendale) or in solid oak (fumed) complete with folding stand, for £12; Style R - in mahogany or oak with 4 octaves for £15; Style F - in mahogany or oak with 5 octaves, for £18.

Surviving examples exist as far afield as New Zealand, where one is preserved in the Whittaker's Musical Museum. A Style F Dulcitone may be seen and played at the Musical Museum, Brentford, England.

== See also ==
- Rhodes piano, another keyboard instrument which produces sound via hammers striking pronged forks - unlike the purely acoustic dulcitone, the Rhodes is an electric instrument and is intended to be amplified making it essentially an 'Electric Dulcitone'.
- Celesta, another keyboard-operated metallophone.

== Gallery ==
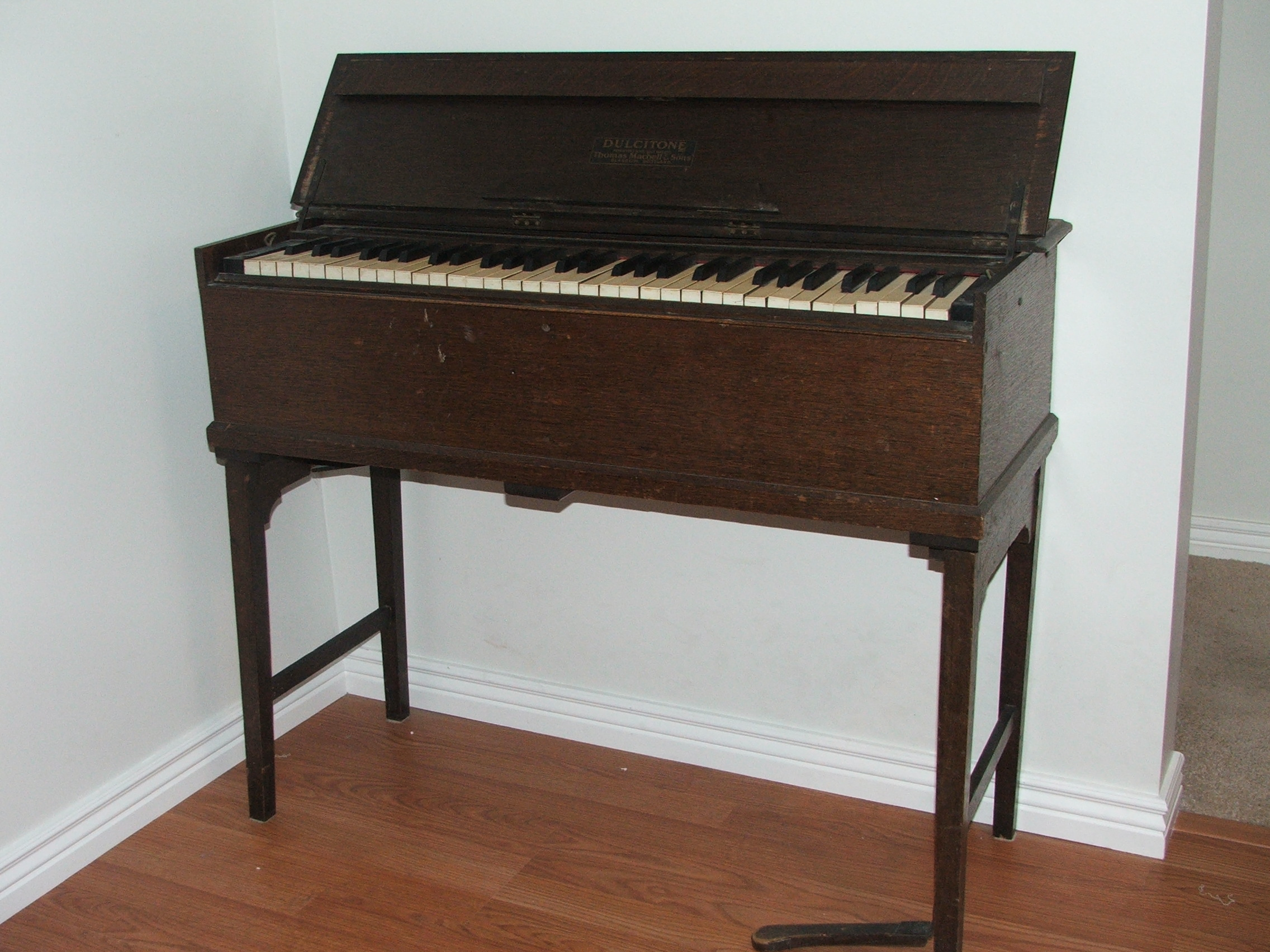
Overall view of Dulcitone

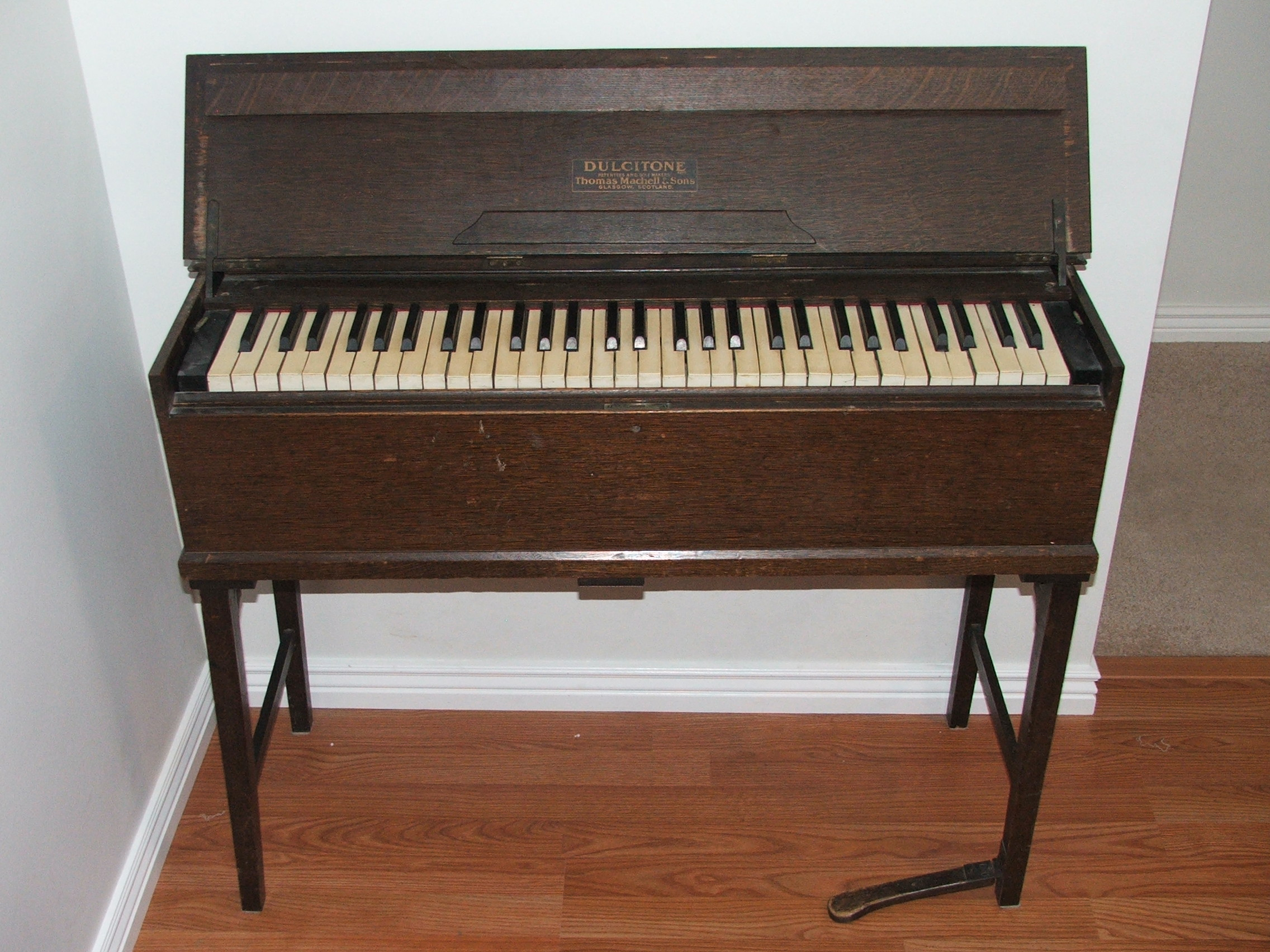
View of Dulcitone keyboard

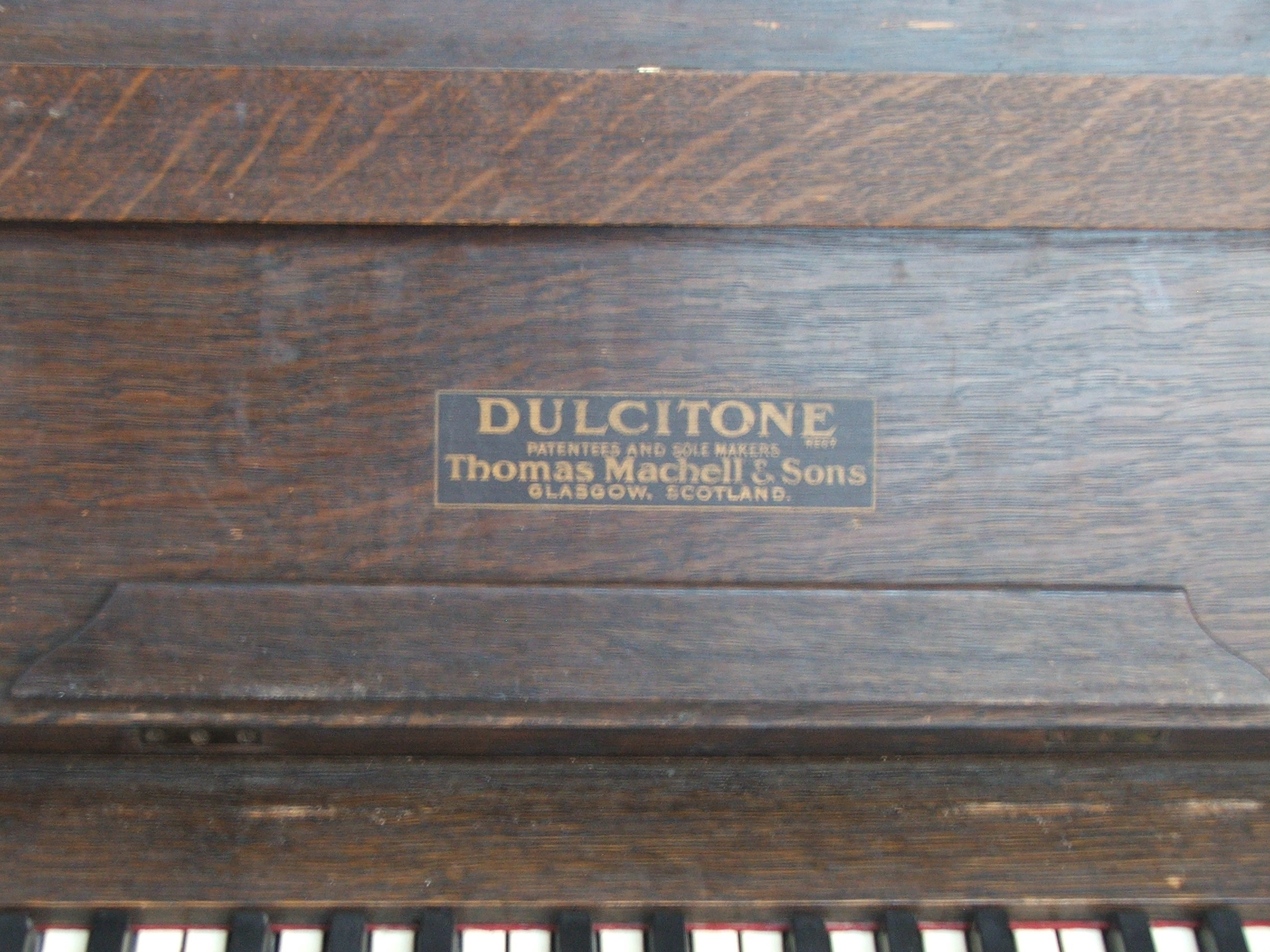
Name decal on inside of lid

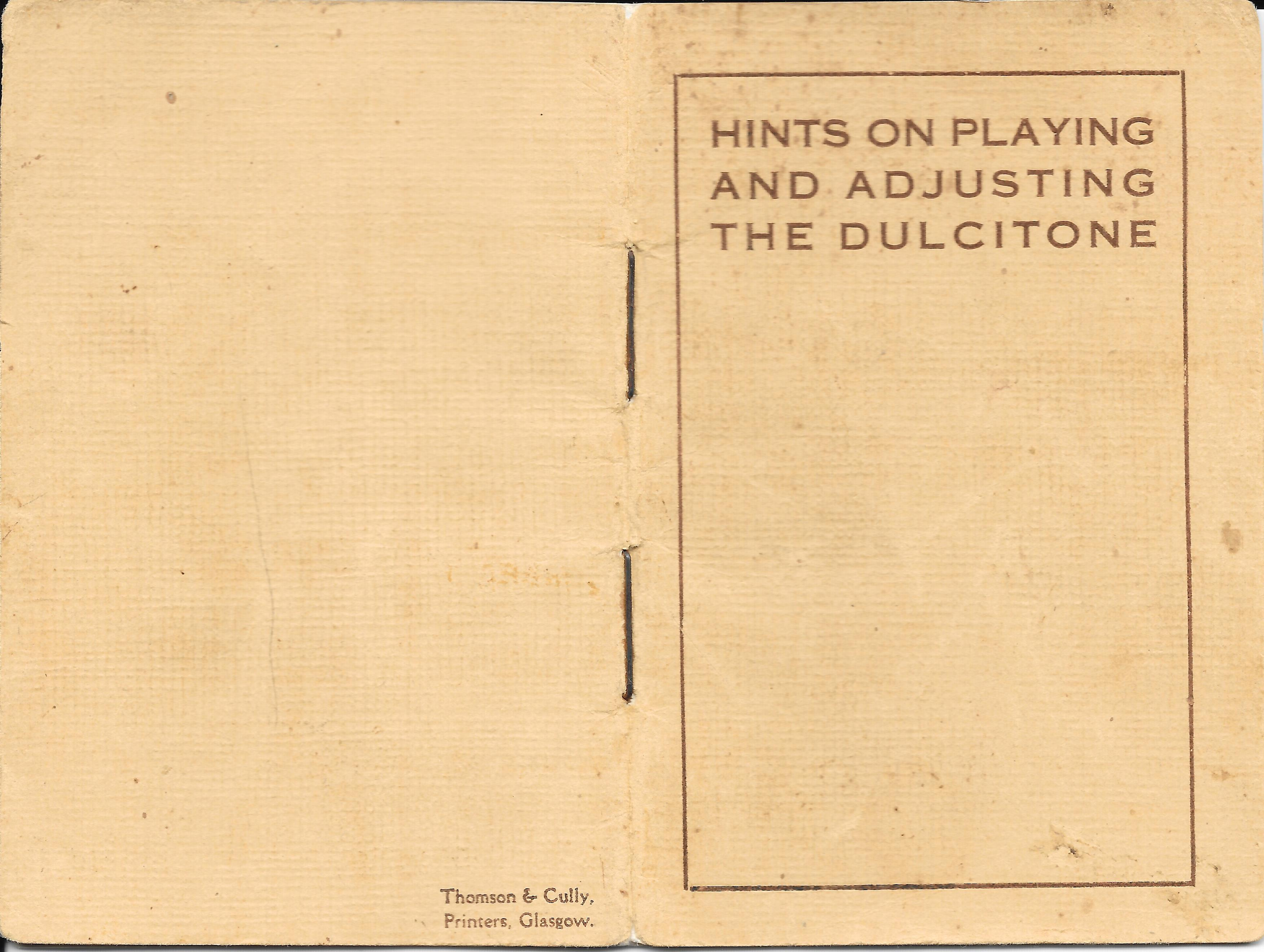
Front cover of users manual

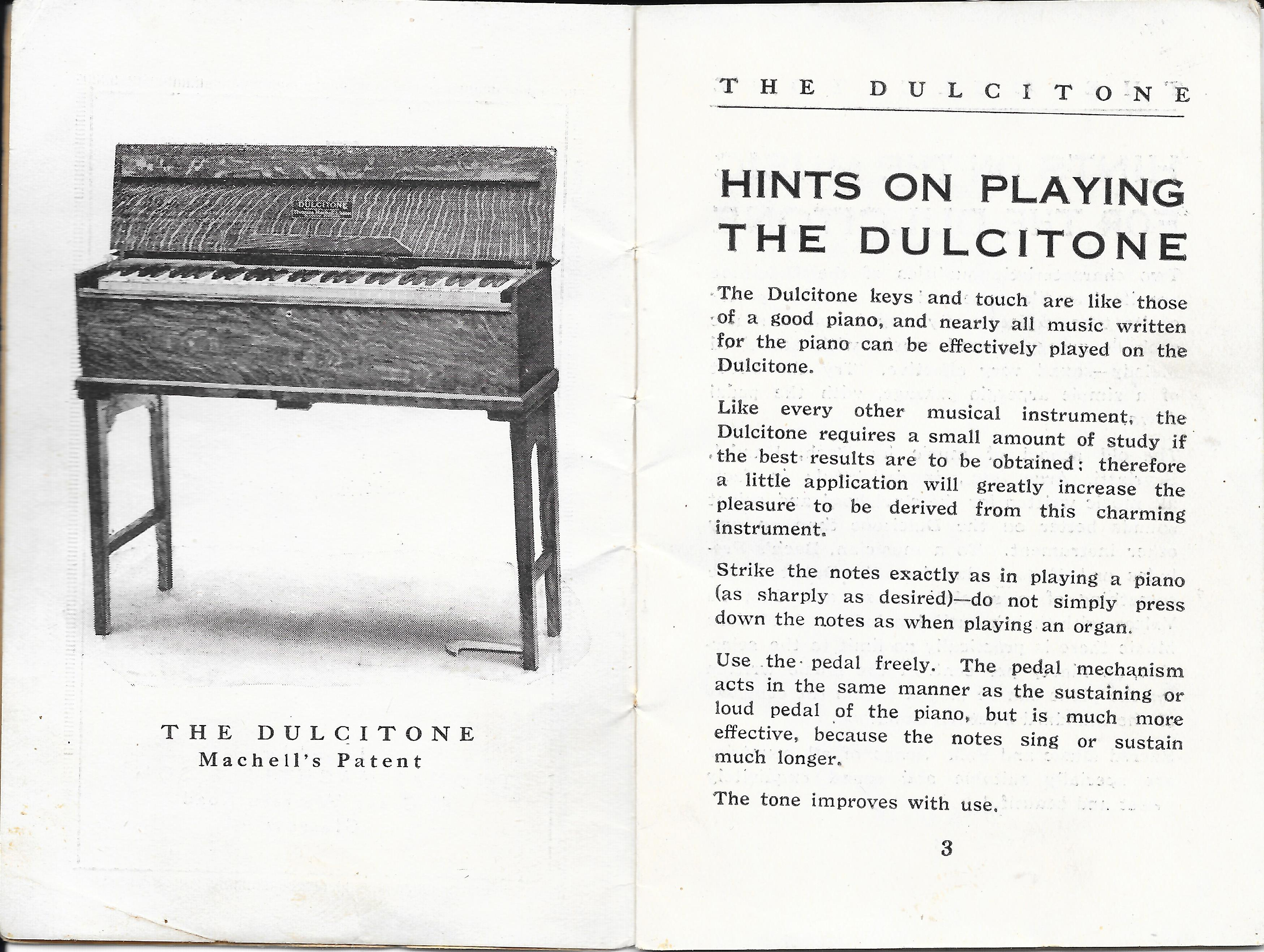
Page 2 & 3 of users manual
