= Martin Townsend (journalist) =

British newspaper editor (1960–2025)

Martin Townsend (11 July 1960 – 17 October 2025) was a British journalist. He was the editor of the Sunday Express from 2001 to 2018.

== Education and career ==
Townsend attended Harrow County School for Boys (which became Harrow High School in 1975) and the London College of Printing. He gained his first job as a journalist in 1979, working on Caravan magazine, then was pop music correspondent at Today.

In 1987, Townsend became a freelance reporter, but in 1994 was appointed showbusiness editor of The Mail on Sunday's You magazine, then in 1999 was appointed editor of OK!. During his tenure, he persuaded Anthea Turner and Grant Bovey to pose with chocolate bars in their wedding photos, as part of a promotion. In 2001, he was appointed editor of the Sunday Express.

In 2006, Townsend had a cameo role in the television series Hustle in which he, as editor of the Sunday Express, bought an exposé story from some con men regarding the unscrupulous editor of a rival (fictional) Sunday newspaper.

== Personal life and death ==
In 1989, Townsend married Jane O'Gorman. The couple had two sons and a daughter. O'Gorman has worked at the Daily Star as the paper's agony aunt.

Townsend died from pancreatic cancer at Chelsea and Westminster Hospital in London, on 17 October 2025, at the age of 65.

== Awards and recognition ==
In 2007, Townsend published The Father I Had, an autobiographical account of his relationship with his father, who had bipolar disorder. This won the Mind Book of the Year Award 2008.

Townsend left his job in early August 2018 during editorial changes at the Express Newspapers group which was initiated in February 2018. Reach plc (formerly Trinity Mirror) bought the titles owned by Richard Desmond's Northern and Shell at that time.

Townsend was the ghost writer of (former) Express owner Richard Desmond's autobiography, The Real Deal: The Autobiography of Britain's Most Controversial Media Mogul which was published in 2015. Lynn Barber, in her Sunday Times review wrote that "the bulk of this memoir, about getting on, is a ripping yarn, fluently and wittily told".

In late 2018, it was announced Townsend had been appointed by the public relations company Pagefield as a partner. The company's clients include Camelot which was the franchise holder for the National Lottery.

Media offices
Preceded by Sharon Ring	Editor of OK! 1999–2002	Succeeded by Nic McCarthy
Preceded by Michael Pilgrim	Editor of the Sunday Express; 2001–2018	Succeeded by Gary Jones
