= Alex Glasgow =

British singer-songwriter (1935–2001)

Alex Glasgow (14 October 1935 – 14 May 2001) was an English singer-songwriter from Low Fell, Gateshead, England. He wrote the songs and music for the musical plays Close the Coal House Door and On Your Way, Riley! by Alan Plater, and scripts for the TV drama When the Boat Comes In, the theme song of which he sang.

== Biography ==
The son of a coal miner, Glasgow was born in Gateshead. His parents had previously emigrated during the depression in the 1930s to New Zealand and then Sydney in Australia, where his sister Isabelle was born. They later returned to the UK and Alex was born in 1935.

He was educated at Gateshead Grammar School, where he was a founding member of the Caprians Choir in 1953. He graduated in Languages from University of Leeds and taught in Germany.

Glasgow met Patricia Wallace, known as "Paddy", at Leeds University in 1955. They married in Bremen, in the north of West Germany, on 5 July 1961. They had three children: Richard, Daniel and Ruth. He left Gateshead and moved to Fremantle, Western Australia with his family in 1981. The press reported that Alex suffered from arthritis and Australia's climate was expected to give him some relief. He spent his last years there and died aged 65 on 14 May 2001, after a long battle with early-onset dementia.

== Career ==
Upon his return from teaching in Germany, Glasgow joined the BBC.

Glasgow was a traditional working class singer-songwriter. His style would be regarded as solidly within the British (and wider) folk music tradition, but Glasgow himself was uncomfortable with the "folk" tag. He became widely known for his own style of Geordie songs, often on political topics, generally socialist and/or trades union-focused. He wrote his own songs, not all political, and earlier in his career sang versions of other popular Geordie folk and socialist political tunes and some of the best of these can be found on albums such as Songs of (Alex Glasgow) and Now and Then. His songs included "The Sunsets, Bonny Lad (the sunsets, that will drive your breath away)", "Any Minute Now", "(They're) Turning the Clock Back (he could hear his granny say)", "The Mary Baker City Mix", "In My Town" and "When It's Ours" (Jackie Boy, when it's ours...).

He is well-remembered for the song cycle "The Tyne Slides By" written in the 1970s for the BBC series The Camera and the Song. The cycle covers the life of a working person in Newcastle when there was still work to be had in the shipyards, from childhood and schooling, early experience of work, the exuberance of free Saturday afternoons and going to see Newcastle United play, musing on a working life as the ship goes down the slipway, grandparenthood and death.

Glasgow was also a writer and radio and television broadcaster; he presented the BBC 2 arts programme New Release in 1967, among other series. While teaching English in Germany he was invited to record the single "True True Happiness" with Nana Gualdi. The song entered the German pop charts in 1959 and led to a job at the BBC on his return to the UK. His theme music from When the Boat Comes In reached the UK singles chart. The song also peaked at number 93 in Australia. He was a long-time friend and collaborator of the playwright and actor Henry Livings with whom he starred in a 1971 comedy sketch series for BBC2, Get The Drift, based on their stage show, The Northern Drift. This included a version of "As Soon as This Pub Closes (The Revolution Starts)". In 1980, he appeared with Livings at the Perth Festival in Western Australia in The Northern Drift. Glasgow emigrated to Australia the following year.

His songs include several which explore the contradictions of socialism, both inside and outside the Labour Party such as "The Socialist ABC", "My Daddy Is A Left-Wing Intellectual", "Little Cloth Cap" and "As Soon As This Pub Closes".

== See also ==
- Geordie dialect words
