= Neil Spencer =

Author, broadcaster and astrologer

Neil Spencer is a British journalist, author, broadcaster and astrologer who lives in north London. He edited the New Musical Express (NME) from 1978 to 1985 and was a founding editor of the men's magazine Arena and of the jazz/art magazine Straight No Chaser. He writes regularly for The Observer, specialising in astrology, music and other aspects of popular culture. According to his website, his work has also appeared in The Independent, Mojo, Uncut and Elle, among other publications.

Spencer was assistant editor of the NME until November 1978, when he took over as editor from Nick Logan. By the early 1980s, it was the most influential music paper in the country. Writing in The Observer in 2005, Spencer selected his tenure as editor as the magazine's "so-called Golden Age", for its positioning of music within "a wider oppositional culture in which politics, books, movies, illustration and photography all had a major role". He cited the magazine's opposition to Thatcherism and the rise of the National Front in the UK, and the US policies under Ronald Reagan.

Spencer's final years at the NME coincided with a period when, as with other established UK music publications such as Melody Maker, Record Mirror and Sounds, the magazine's popularity suffered with the emergence of the more pop-focused Smash Hits. In 1983, he told Rolling Stone: "The fans of that music are, for the most part, very young ... We are a bit of a grown-up publication. And I have no interest in editing a fab-pix issue. Besides, Smash Hits, quite honestly, has got that market." After leaving the NME, he was the founding editor of Arena, which launched in 1986.

In November 1985, Spencer helped found Red Wedge with British musicians Paul Weller and Billy Bragg. The collective aimed to engage young people with politics, and the policies of the Labour Party in particular, in the lead-up to the 1987 general election. According to Bragg, Spencer's involvement was "absolutely crucial" since, further to his support of politically minded artists while at the NME, "He was a child of '68 and still believed that music should say something, and that as a musician you should be able to express an alternative lifestyle to the mainstream." In early 1986, Spencer was the press officer for the Red Wedge UK tour, which featured a large cast of musicians, including Bragg, Weller's band the Style Council, the Communards and Tom Robinson.

In 2000, Spencer's book True As the Stars Above: Adventures in Modern Astrology was published in the UK by Gollancz. He has also contributed to the books Fatherhood (Gollancz; ed. Peter Howarth), Chic Thrills, A Fashion Reader (Pandora Press; ed. Juliet Ash), David Bailey's Rock & Roll Heroes, and City Secrets London.

Among his film projects, Spencer co-wrote the screenplay for Bollywood Queen (2003), directed by Jeremy Wooding.

== Books ==
- Spencer, Neil. True As the Stars Above: Adventures in Modern Astrology. Gollancz, 2000.

Media offices
Preceded by Nick Logan	Editor of the NME; 1978–1985	Succeeded by Ian Pye
