= Robin Denselow =

English writer, journalist, and broadcaster

Robin Denselow is an English writer, journalist, and broadcaster.

== Education ==
Denselow was educated at Leighton Park School, a boys' Quaker boarding independent school (now co-educational) in Reading, Berkshire, followed by New College, Oxford, where he studied English.

== Life and career ==
After a student-trip to India with COMEX, the Commonwealth Expedition in 1965, Denselow first joined the BBC African Service as a producer and reporter working on current affairs programmes. In 1980, when BBC Two's flagship news programme Newsnight started, he became a reporter for them. Denselow has reported from all over the world but with a particular interest in Africa, South America and the Middle East. His report on Gulf War syndrome in 1993 won the International TV Programming Award at the New York Television Festival.

As well as reporting on current affairs, Denselow has written extensively on world music and folk music for The Guardian newspaper and other publications. By 1989, he was also covering rock/pop reviews for the paper. In the 1980s, he chaired the music discussion programme Eight Days a Week. His book When the Music's Over: the Story of Political Pop was published by Faber and Faber in 1989.
