= 1933 New Year Honours =

British royal recognitions

The 1933 New Year Honours were appointments by King George V to various orders and honours to reward and highlight good works by citizens of the United Kingdom and British Empire. They were announced on 30 December 1932.

The recipients of honours are displayed here as they were styled before their new honour, and arranged by honour, with classes (Knight, Knight Grand Cross, etc.) and then divisions (Military, Civil, etc.) as appropriate.

== United Kingdom and British Empire ==
=== Baron ===
- Sir Joseph Duveen Bt Trustee of the National Gallery. Trustee of the Wallace Collection. Trustee of the Imperial College of Art. For public services.
- Sir Thomas Jeeves Horder Bt KCVO FRCP Senior Physician to St. Bartholomew's Hospital.
- Field-Marshal Sir George Francis Milne GCB GCMG DSO Colonel Commandant, Royal Artillery. Master Gunner, St. James's Park. Chief of the Imperial General Staff since 1926.
- Sir Charles Alexander Nall-Cain Bt JP DL For political and public services in Lancashire and Hertfordshire.
- The Right Honourable Sir (James) Rennell Rodd GCB GCMG GCVO Member of Parliament for Marylebone, 1928-32. His Majesty's Ambassador at the Court of the Quirinal, 1908-19. For political and public services.
- Sir Walter Runciman Bt JP Senior partner of the firm of Walter Runciman & Co., Ltd. Chairman and Managing Director of the Moor line of cargo steamships and many other shipping organisations.

=== Privy Councillor ===
The King appointed the following to His Majesty's Most Honourable Privy Council:

- The Honourable John Greig Latham CMG KC Attorney-General and Minister for External Affairs, and for Industry, Commonwealth of Australia.
- Captain Henry David Reginald Margesson MC MP Member of Parliament for the Upton Division of West Ham, 1922–23; and for Rugby since 1924. Assistant Government Whip, 1924. Junior Lord of the Treasury, 1926–29 and Chief Whip since November.

=== Baronetcies ===
- Frederick Charles Allen, President of the Chamber of Shipping, 1931-32. Chairman of the National Maritime Board. Chairman of the National Council of Port Labour Employers. Chairman of the Shipping Federation.
- Captain Sir George Edward Wentworth Bowyer MC DL MP Member of Parliament for Buckingham since December 1918. Junior Lord of the Treasury, 1927 to June 1929. An Assistant Conservative Whip since 1925. For political and public services.
- Sir Ernest Musgrave Harvey KBE Deputy Governor of the Bank of England.
- The Right Honourable (James) Ian Macpherson KC JP MP Member of Parliament for Boss and Cromarty since 1911. Recorder of Southend since 1931. Undersecretary of State for War, 1914-16. Chief Secretary for Ireland, 1916-20. Minister of Pensions, 1920-22. For political and public services.
- Major Sir Robert Spencer-Nairn TD JP President of the Scottish Unionist Association, 19S1-1932. For political and public services.
- Sir Owen Seaman Editor of Punch since 1906.

=== Knight Bachelor ===
- Walter Galpin Alcock MVO FRCM FRCO Organist of Salisbury Cathedral since 1916. For services to music.
- Percy Alden, Chairman of the British Institute of Social Service. Honorary Secretary of the Settlements Association. Bursar of the Sir Richard Stapley Educational Trust. A Trustee of the Halley Stewart Trust. Chairman of the Save the Children Fund.
- Derwent Hall Caine, Member of Parliament for the Everton Division of Liverpool, 1929-31. For political and public services.
- Cornelius Chambers JP For political and public services in Birmingham.
- Cecil Algernon Cochrane DCL JP Chairman of the Council of Armstrong College, University of Durham.
- (Ernest George) Stenson Cooke, Secretary of the Automobile Association since 1905.
- Montagu Hounsel Cox JP Clerk to the London County Council.
- Major Frederick William Beresford Cripps DSO JP DL For political and public services in Gloucestershire.
- Colonel William Warrington Dobson VD TD JP DL Chairman of the Stafford Division Conservative Association for the past 30 years. For political and public services in Staffordshire.
- Harriss Firth Chief Valuer, Board of Inland Revenue.
- James Wilson Garner JP For political and public services in Bermondsey.
- John Hobbis Harris, Parliamentary Secretary to the Anti-Slavery and Aborigines Protection Society.
- Harley Hugh Dalrymple-Hay MInstCE Consulting Engineer. For his inventions and services in connection with the construction of tube railways.
- Ambrose Heal, Chairman and Managing Director of Messrs. Heal and Sons, Ltd. In recognition of his services to the industrial arts and crafts.
- Professor Frederick Thomas George Hobday CMG FRCVS FRSE Principal and Dean of the Royal Veterinary College.
- Arthur James Croft Huddleston CMG OBE lately Economic Adviser to the Sudan Government.
- John Peter Todd Jackson JP DL For political services and for public services especially in connection with agricultural co-operation in Lancashire.
- Eric Robert Dalrymple Maclagan CBE FSA Director and Secretary, Victoria and Albert Museum.
- Major Alan McLean MBE MP Member of Parliament for South-West Norfolk, December, 1923 to May, 1929, and since October, 1931. For political and public services.
- Lieutenant-Colonel Watkin Randall Kynaston Mainwaring CBE JP DL For political and public services in North Wales.
- Philip Hubert Martineau, Senior partner in the firm of Martineau and Reid. Late President of the Law Society.
- William Henry Mountstephen JP Chairman of the Devonport Liberal Association. For political and public services.
- Lieutenant-Colonel Charles Frederick Oliver TD DL For political and public services in Leicestershire.
- Robert Sangster Rait CBE JP DL Principal and Vice-chancellor of Glasgow University since 1929. Chairman of the Board of Trustees of the National Library of Scotland.
- Eugene Joseph Squire Hargreaves Ramsden OBE JP MP Member of Parliament for Bradford North, October, 1924 to May, 1929, and since October, 1931. For political and public services.
- Samuel Thomas Rosbotham JP MP Member of Parliament for Ormskirk since 1929. For political and public services.
- Major Isidore Salmon CBE JP DL MP Member of Parliament for Harrow since October, 1924. Member of the London County Council for eighteen years. For political and public services.
- Michael Grieve Thorburn, Convener of Peeblesshire for thirty years. For political and public services in Peeblesshire.

Diplomatic Service and Overseas List

- Herbert William Gepp, Consultant to the Government of the Commonwealth of Australia and Chairman of the Consultative Committee advisory to the Commonwealth Government on development.
- Alexander Gray KC President of the Law Society, Dominion of New Zealand.
- The Honourable Walter Kingsmill, President of the Senate, Commonwealth of Australia.
- John Lawrence McKelvey. For services to Surgery in the Commonwealth of Australia.
- William Perry, President of the Royal Agricultural Society, Dominion of New Zealand.
- Alexander Fraser Russell, Chief Justice of Southern Rhodesia.
- Alderman the Honourable Samuel Robert Walder, Lord Mayor of Sydney and Member of the Legislative Council of the State of New South Wales.

Colonies, Protectorates, etc.

- Edward St. John Jackson OBE KC Attorney-General, Ceylon.
- Harry Charles Luke CMG Lieutenant-Governor of the Island of Malta.
- James Stanley Rae, Chief Justice of the Leeward Islands.
- William Edward Leonard Shenton, Unofficial Member of the Executive and Legislative Councils of Hong Kong. For public services.
- Henry William Watlington OBE Member of the Executive Council and of the House of Assembly of Bermuda. For public services.

British India

- Nawab Muhammad Yusuf, Barrister-at-Law, Minister to the Governor of the United Provinces for Local Self-Government.
- Malik Feroz Khan Noon, Barrister-at-Law, Minister to the Governor of the Punjab for Education.
- Lieutenant-Colonel Richard John Charles Burke, of the Political Department, Resident in Mysore.
- Justice Thomas Stewart Macpherson CIE Indian Civil Service, Puisne Judge of the High Court of Judicature at Patna, Bihar and Orissa.
- Sardar Sahib Suleman Cassum Haji Mitha CIE Merchant, Bombay.
- Thomas Ryan CIE Indian Audit and Accounts Department, Director-General of Posts and Telegraphs.
- M. R. Ry. Diwan Bahadur Konkoth Ramunni Menon Avargal, Vice-chancellor, University of Madras.
- George Lethbridge Colvin CB CMG DSO Agent, East Indian Railway, Calcutta.
- Colonel Cusack Walton DSO lately Agent, North-Western Railway, Lahore.
- Maharaj Singh CIE United Provinces Civil Service, Agent to the Government of India in South Africa.
- Dudley Myers, First President of the European Association in India, and lately Joint Honorary Secretary of the Conservative India Committee.
- M. R. Ry. Rao Bahadur Vangal Thiruvenkatachari Krishnamachari Avargal CIE Madras Civil Service, Dewan of Baroda State.
- Khan Bahadur Nawab Liaqat Hayat Khan OBE Prime Minister, Patiala, Punjab States.
- San Crombie Po CBE Medical Practitioner, and Municipal Commissioner, Bassein, Burma.
- Edward Charles Benthall, Head Partner, Messrs. Bird & Co., Calcutta, Bengal.

=== The Most Ancient and Most Noble Order of the Thistle ===
==== Knight of the Most Ancient and Most Noble Order of the Thistle (KT) ====
- The Right Honourable Sir Herbert Eustace Maxwell Bt FRS DCL Chairman of the Royal Commission on Scottish Historical Monuments, and late Chairman of the Board of Trustees of the National Library of Scotland. President of the Society of Antiquaries of Scotland, 1900-13. Lord Lieutenant of Wigtownshire since 1903.

=== The Most Honourable Order of the Bath ===
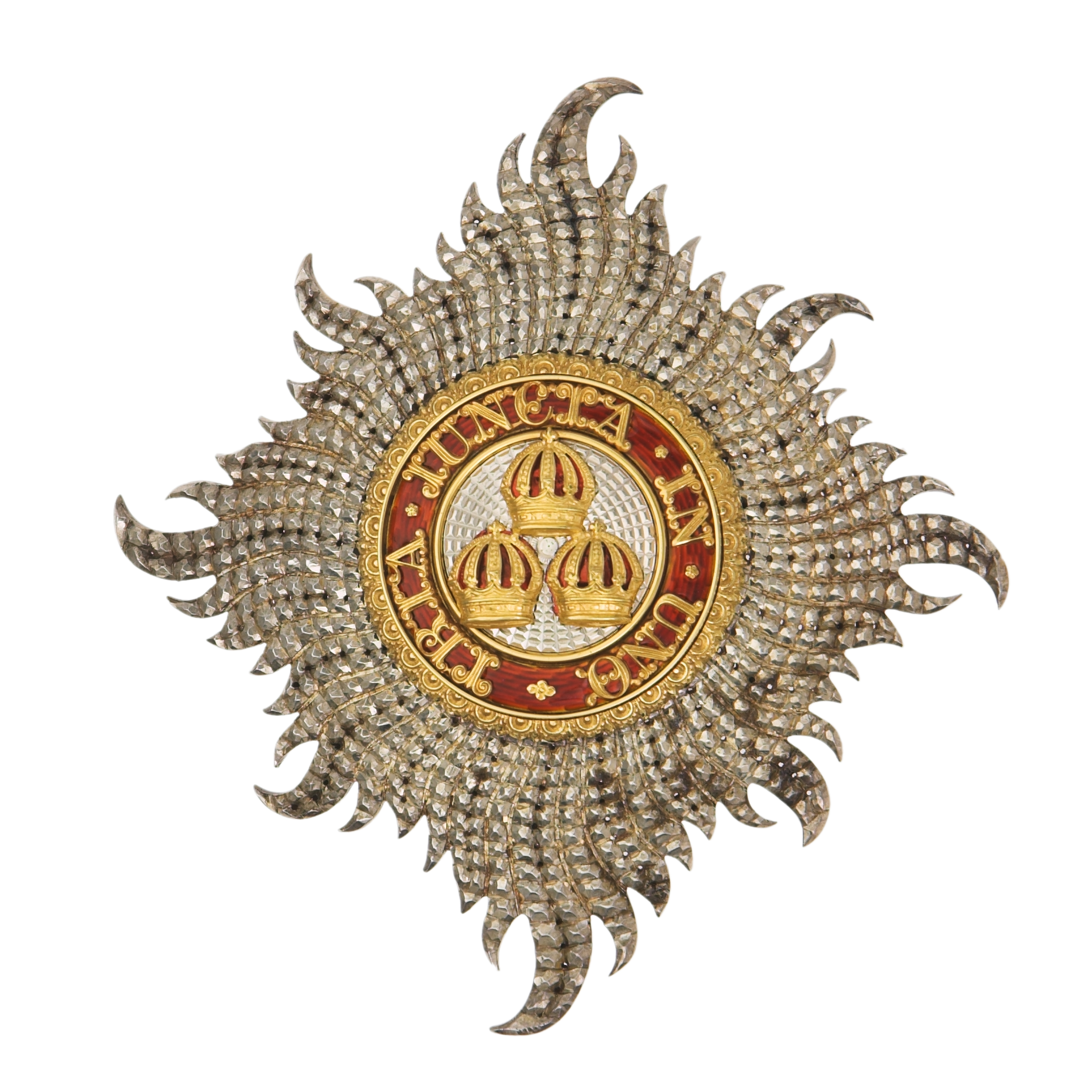
Civil star of the Knight Grand Cross of the Order of the Bath

==== Knight Grand Cross of the Order of the Bath (GCB) ====
Military Division
Army

- General Sir Charles Harington Harington CBE KCB DSO DCL Colonel, The King's Regiment (Liverpool), Colonel Commandant, Army Educational Corps, Colonel, 4th/15th Punjab Regiment, Indian Army, Aide-de-camp General to The King, General Officer Commanding-in-Chief, Aldershot Command.

==== Knight Commander of the Order of the Bath (KCB) ====
Military Division
Royal Navy

- Vice-Admiral Roger Roland Charles Backhouse CB CMG
- Vice-Admiral Henry Percy Douglas CB CMG (Retired).
- General Richard Vernon Tredinnick Ford CB CBE RM

Army

- Lieutenant-General Archibald Rice Cameron CB CMG Colonel, The Black Watch (Royal Highlanders), General Officer Commanding-in-chief designate, Scottish Command.

Royal Air Force

- Air Vice-Marshal Edgar Rainey Ludlow-Hewitt CB CMG DSO MC Royal Air Force.

Civil Division

- Arthur William Johns CB CBE
- Sir Frederick William Leith-Ross KCMG CB Chief Economic Adviser to His Majesty's Government.
- Edward Henry Pelham CB Permanent Secretary, Board of Education.
- Gilbert Charles Upcott CB Comptroller arid Auditor General.

==== Companion of the Order of the Bath (CB) ====
Military Division
Royal Navy

- Rear Admiral Sidney Robert Bailey CBE DSO
- Engineer Rear-Admiral George Preece.
- Surgeon Rear-Admiral Herbert Reginald Harry Denny MRCS LRCP

Army

- Major-General George Henry Addison CMG DSO (late Royal Engineers), Engineer-in-Chief, Army Headquarters, India.
- Major-General John Randle Minshull Minshull-Ford DSO MC (late The Royal Welch Fusiliers), Half-Pay List.
- Major-General Harry Reginald Walter Marriott Smith CBE DSO (late Royal Artillery), President, Ordnance Committee, and Royal Artillery Committee.
- Major-General Charles Clement Armitage CMG DSO (late Royal Artillery), Half-Pay List.
- Colonel (temporary Brigadier) Herbert Edmund Reginald Rubens Braine CMG DSO (late The Royal Munster Fusiliers), Commander, 12th (Secunderabad) Infantry Brigade, India.
- Colonel (temporary Brigadier) David Forster CMG DSO (late Royal Engineers), Commander, 13th Infantry Brigade.
- Colonel Charles Reed DSO Indian Army, Inspector of Indian Army Ordnance Services.
- Colonel (temporary Brigadier) John Henry Foster Lakin CSI ADC Indian Army, Commander, Delhi (Independent) Brigade Area, India.
- Colonel (temporary Brigadier) David Graeme Ridgeway DSO Indian Army, Commander, Allahabad Brigade Area, India.
- Colonel Kenelm Digby Bold Murray DSO Indian Army, General Staff Officer, 1st Grade, The War Office.

Royal Air Force

- Air Commodore Cuthbert Trelawder Maclean DSO MC

Civil Division

- Rear-Admiral Richard Augustus Sandys Hill CBE
- Rear-Admiral Francis Loftus Tottenham CBE
- Rear-Admiral Robin Campsie Dalglish.
- John Bradley Abraham, Assistant Secretary, Air Ministry.
- Colonel Thomas Macdonald Banks DSO MC Controller Post Office Savings Bank Department.
- Leonard Browett CBE Principal Assistant Secretary, Board of Trade.
- Charles Matthews Bruce OBE Principal Assistant Secretary, Admiralty.
- Bryan Hugh Fell, Principal Clerk, Public Bill Office, House of Commons, and Clerk of the Fees.
- Frederick William Leggett, Principal Assistant Secretary (Acting), Ministry of Labour.
- Sir Lawrence Margerison CBE Secretary, National Savings Committee.
- Sigismund David Waley MC Principal Assistant Secretary, H.M. Treasury.
- Colonel Alexander Kirkwood Reid DSO MC TD Territorial Army.

=== The Most Exalted Order of the Star of India ===
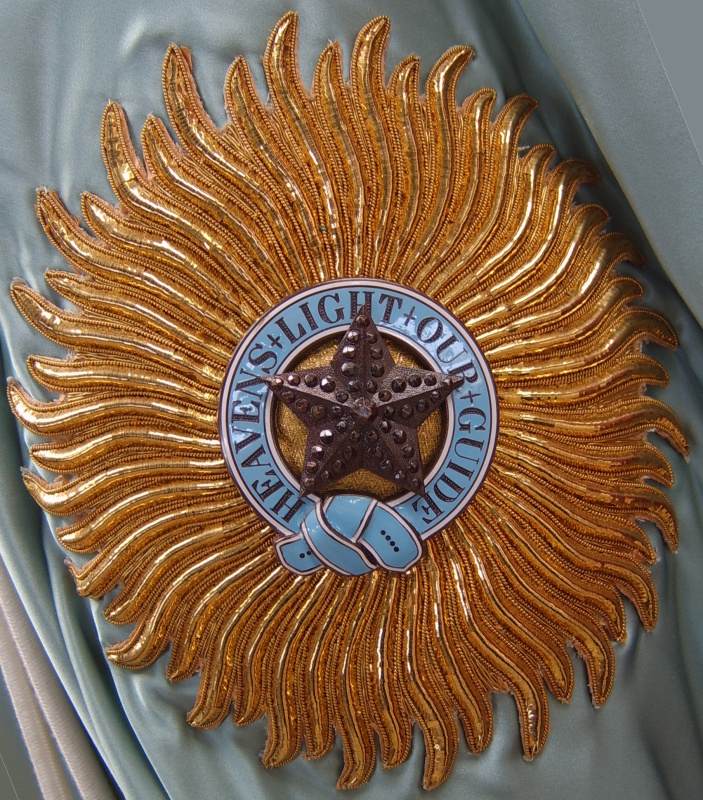
Star of a Knight Grand Commander of the Most Exalted Order of the Star of India.

==== Knight Grand Commander (GCSI) ====
- Colonel His Highness Maharaja Sir Hari Singh, Indar Mahindar Bahadur Sipar-i-Sultanat GCIE KCVO ADC Maharaja of Jammu and Kashmir.

==== Knight Commander (KCSI) ====
- Sir Joseph William Bhore KCIE CBE Indian Civil Service, Member of the Governor-General's Executive Council.
- Harry Graham Haig CSI CIE Indian Civil Service, Member of the Governor-General's Executive Council.
- Captain Nawab Sir Muhammad Ahmad Said Khan KCIE MBE of Chhatari, Member of the Executive Council of the Governor of the United Provinces.
- Sir Provash Chandra Mitter CIE Member of the Executive Council of the Governor of Bengal.
- Sir Henry Duffield Craik Bt CSI Indian Civil Service, Member of the Executive Council of the Governor of the Punjab.
- Vice-Admiral Humphrey Thomas Walwyn CB DSO Flag Officer Commanding, and Director, Royal Indian Marine.
- Sir Reginald Arthur Mant KCIE CSI Member of the Council of India.

==== Companion (CSI) ====
- Idwal Geoffrey Lloyd, Indian Civil Service, Acting Member of the Executive Council of the Governor of Burma.
- Bertrand James Glancy CIE of the Political Department, Agent to the Governor-General in Central India.
- John Collard Bernard Drake CIE CBE Indian Civil Service, Secretary to the Government of India, Commerce Department.
- Charles William Aldis Turner CIE Indian Civil Service, Chief Secretary to the Government of Bombay, Political Department, and Reforms Officer, Bombay.
- Charles Alexander Souter, Indian Civil Service, Member of the Board of Revenue, Madras.
- John Austen Hubback, Indian Civil Service, Commissioner, Chota Nagpur Division, and now Officiating Member of the Board of Revenue, Bihar and Orissa.
- Digby Livingstone Drake-Brockman CIE Indian Civil Service, Commissioner, United Provinces.
- John Arthur Laing Swan, Indian Civil Service, Chairman, Calcutta Improvement Trust, at present Chairman, Bengal Retrenchment Committee, Bengal.
- Arthur Ralph Astbury CIE Indian Service of Engineers, Secretary to Government (Electricity) and Commercial Manager, Hydro-Electric Branch, Public Works Department, Punjab.

=== The Most Distinguished Order of Saint Michael and Saint George ===
Star of the Order of Saint Michael and Saint George.

==== Knight Grand Cross of the Order of St Michael and St George (GCMG) ====
- The Right Honourable Sir George Halsey Perley KCMG Minister without Portfolio, Dominion of Canada.
- Sir Horace John Wilson KCB CBE Chief Industrial Adviser to His Majesty's Government in the United Kingdom.

==== Knight Commander of the Order of St Michael and St George (KCMG) ====
- Admiral Sir Dudley Rawson Stratford de Chair KCB MVO formerly Governor of the State of New South Wales.
- The Honourable Henry Somer Gullett, Minister of State for Trade and Customs, Commonwealth of Australia.
- Rupert Beswicke Howorth CB CMG Deputy Secretary, Cabinet Office.
- The Honourable Harry Sutherland Wightman Lawson, Member for the State of Victoria of the Senate, Commonwealth of Australia; formerly Premier of Victoria.
- Frederick Phillips CB Under-Secretary, Treasury.
- Geoffrey Granville Whiskard CB CMG Assistant Under-Secretary of State, Dominions Office.

Colonies, Protectorates, etc.

- Herbert Richmond Palmer CMG CBE Governor and Commander-in-Chief of the Colony of the Gambia.
- Colonel Sir Kinahan Cornwallis CMG CBE DSO Adviser to the Ministry of the Interior, Iraq.

Diplomatic Service and Overseas List

- Eric Teichman CMG CIE Chinese Secretary at His Majesty's Legation in Peking.
- Frank Pears Watson OBE Financial Adviser to the Egyptian Government.
- Charles John FitzRoy Rhys Wingfield CMG His Majesty's Envoy Extraordinary and Minister Plenipotentiary at Oslo.

==== Companion of the Order of St Michael and St George (CMG) ====
- Captain Henry Thomas Birch-Reynardson, Secretary to the Governor-General of the Union of South Africa.
- John Job Crew Bradfield MICE Government Engineer, Sydney Harbour Bridge, State of New South Wales.
- Professor Douglas Berry Copland Professor of Commerce, University of Melbourne. For services to the Commonwealth of Australia.
- Lawrence Ennis OBE Constructing Engineer for Messrs. Dorman, Long and Company, Sydney Harbour Bridge, State of New South Wales.
- Charles Joseph Flynn, Assistant Secretary, Board of Customs and Excise.
- Robert Sutherland Forsyth, Representative of the Dominion of New Zealand on the Empire Marketing Board, and Representative in the United Kingdom of the New Zealand Meat Producers Board.
- Alan Frederick Lascelles MVO MC Secretary to the Governor-General of the Dominion of Canada.
- Stuart Gordon McFarlane MBE Assistant Secretary (Administrative), Treasury, Commonwealth of Australia.
- James Marchbanks MICE lately General Manager, and Chief Engineer, Wellington Harbour Board, Dominion of New Zealand.
- Arnold Edersheim Overton MC Assistant Secretary, Board of Trade.
- Arthur William Street CIE MC Principal Assistant Secretary, Ministry of Agriculture and Fisheries.
- William James Uglow Woolcock CBE Chairman of the Committee of Non-official Advisers associated with the Industrial Advisers of the United Kingdom Delegation at the Ottawa Conference.

Colonies, Protectorates, etc.

- Captain Gerard Leslie Makins Clauson OBE Principal, Colonial Office.
- John Ernest William Flood, Assistant Secretary, Colonial Office.
- Colonel Will Hodgson Franklin CBE DSO His Majesty's Trade Commissioner in East Africa; and Commissioner in London for His Majesty's Eastern African Dependencies (Trade and Information) Office.
- Walter Burford Johnson West African Medical Staff, Director of Medical and Sanitary Service, Nigeria.
- Arthur Frederick Richards, Governor of the State of North Borneo.
- Robert Walter Taylor CBE Treasurer, Tanganyika Territory.
- Colonel Charles William Game Walker DSO Secretary to the Conference of Governors of the East African Dependencies, and Secretary to the High Commissioner for Transport, Kenya and Uganda.
- Colonel John Chappell Ward CIE DSO MBE Port Director and Director-General of Navigation, Basra, Iraq.

Diplomatic Service and Overseas List

- Robert Vickers Bardsley OBE lately Governor of the Blue Nile Province, Sudan.
- Charles St. John Collier, Governor of the Bank of Ethiopia.
- Leonard Arthur de Lacy Meredith OBE Managing Director of the Travel and Industrial Development Association of Great Britain and Ireland.
- Maurice Drummond Peterson, a Counsellor in the Foreign Office.
- Geoffrey Harington Thompson, First Secretary at His Majesty's Embassy at Santiago.
- Herbert Adolphus Grant Watson, His Majesty's Envoy Extraordinary and Minister Plenipotentiary at Guatemala.
- Ralph Follett Wigram, First Secretary at His Majesty's Embassy in Paris.

Honorary Companion

- His Highness Abu Bakar ibni Al-Marhum Sultan Abdullah, Sultan of Pahang, Malay States.

=== Order of the Indian Empire ===
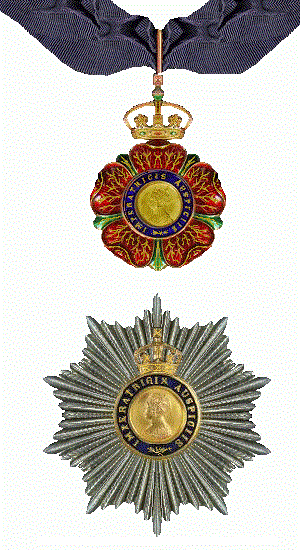
Riband, badge and star of the Knight Grand Commander of the Order of the Indian Empire

==== Knight Grand Commander (GCIE) ====
- Sir Geoffrey Fitzhervey de Montmorency KCIE KCVO CBE Governor of the Punjab.
- Sir Atul Chandra Chatterjee KCSI KCIE Member of the Council of India.

==== Knight Commander (KCIE) ====
- His Highness Sri Rai-i-Rayan Maharawal Prithi Singh Bahadur, Maharawal of Banswara, Rajputana.
- Khan Bahadur Sir Muhammad Usman Sahib Bahadur, Member of the Executive Council of the Governor of Madras.
- Brigadier-General Terence Humphrey Keyes CSI CMG CIE of the Political Department, Resident at Hyderabad.
- Walter Frank Hudson CIE Indian Civil Service, Member of the Executive Council of the Governor of Bombay.
- Major-General John Wallace Dick Megaw CIE Indian Medical Service, Director-General, Indian Medical Service.
- Maharajadhiraja Kameshwar Singh, of Darbhanga; landholder, Bihar and Orissa.

==== Companion (CIE) ====
- Allan Macleod, Indian Civil Service, Financial Adviser, Military Finance, Government of India.
- Earn Chandra MBE Indian Civil Service; Joint Secretary to the Government of India, Department of Education, Health and Lands.
- Major-General William Charles Hughan Forster, Indian Medical Service, Surgeon-General with the Government of Bombay.
- Sao Kin Maung, Sawbwa of Mong Mit State, Burma.
- James Braid Taylor, Indian Civil Service, Controller of the Currency.
- Charles Lyall Philip, Indian Civil Service, Commissioner, Orissa Division, Bihar and Orissa.
- Captain Sher Muhammad Khan MBE Member of the Legislative Assembly, of Jhelum, Punjab.
- Edmond Nicolas Blandy, Indian Civil Service, Secretary to the Government of Bengal, Finance, Commerce and Marine Departments.
- Noel James Roughton, Indian Civil Service, Secretary to the Government of the Central Provinces, Finance Department.
- Charles Gerald Trevor, Indian Forest Service, Chief Conservator of Forests, Punjab and North-West Frontier Province.
- Colonel John Norman Walker, Indian Medical Service (retired), Director, Medical Department, and Sanitary Commissioner, His Exalted Highness the Nizam's Government, Hyderabad, Deccan.
- Lieutenant-Colonel Robert Beresford Seymour Sewell, Indian Medical Service, Director, Zoological Survey of India.
- Lieutenant-Colonel Arthur Henry Eyre Mosse, of the Political Department, Vice-President of the State Council, Bhavnagar, Western India States Agency.
- Lieutenant-Colonel Charles Terence Chichele Plowden, of the Political Department, lately Political Agent in Kalat, Baluchistan.
- Edgar Stuart Roffey, Member of the Legislative Council, Solicitor, Dibrugarh, Assam.
- Vivian Augustus Short, Indian Police Service, Commandant, Frontier Constabulary, North-West Frontier Province.
- William Duncan MacGregor, MIEE Posts and Telegraphs Department, lately Postmaster-General, Bengal and Assam.
- Lieutenant-Colonel David Seton Johnston, R.E. Chairman, Aden Port Trust and of the Executive Committee of the Aden Settlement, Aden.
- Harold Riley Roe, Indian Police Service, Superintendent of Police, United Provinces.
- Hugh George Rawlinson FRHistS Indian Educational Service, Principal, Deccan College, Poona, Bombay.
- John Gordon Cameron Scott, Principal, Prince of Wales Royal Indian Military College, Dehra Dun.
- The Reverend William Herbert Greenland Padfield, lately Principal and Secretary, Lawrence Memorial Royal Military School, Madras.
- Rai Bahadur Pandit Seetla Prasad Bajpai, Chief Justice, Jaipur State, Rajputana.
- Khan Bahadur Hafiz Hidayat Husain, Member of the Legislative Council Barrister-at-Law, Cawnpore, United Provinces.
- Rai Bahadur Abinash Chandra Banarji, Merchant and Chairman, District Board, Birbhum, Bengal.
- David Keith Cunnison, Secretary, Bengal Chamber of Commerce, Calcutta, Bengal.

=== The Royal Victorian Order ===
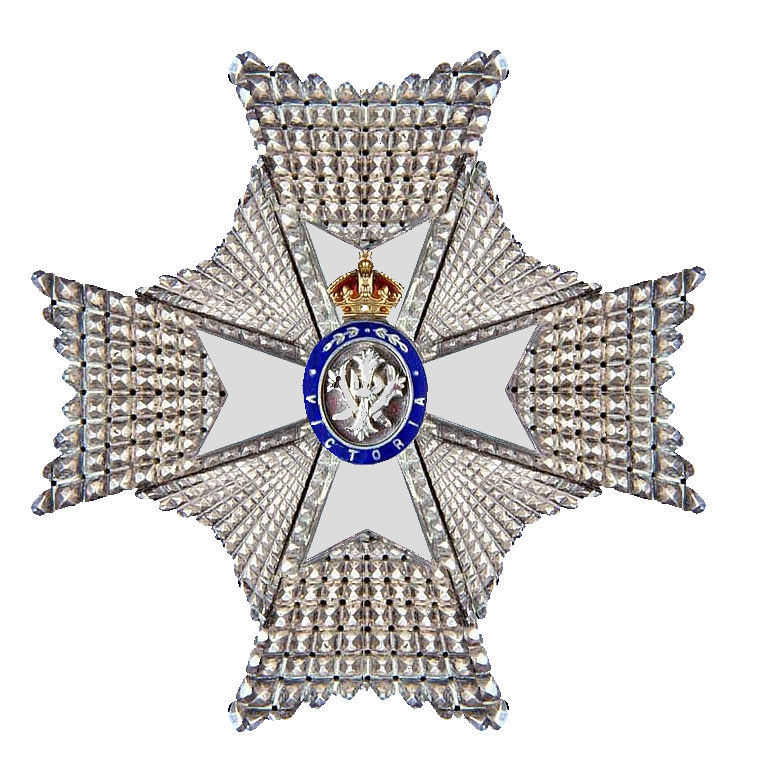
Insignia of a Knight / Dames Commander of the Royal Victorian Order

==== Knight Grand Cross of the Royal Victorian Order (GCVO) ====
- John Charles, The Marquess Camden.
- Admiral Sir Montague Edward Browning GCB GCMG MVO
- Sir Lionel Earle KCB KCVO CMG

==== Knight Commander of the Royal Victorian Order (KCVO) ====
- Sir Philip Horace Freeman KBE
- Edward Denny Bacon CVO (dated 21 December 1932).
- Frederic Jeune Willans CVO MRCS LRCP

==== Commander of the Royal Victorian Order (CVO) ====
- Captain The Lord Claud Nigel Hamilton CMG DSO MVO
- Brigadier-General Archibald Fraser Home CB CMG DSO
- Major Colin William MacRae CBE
- Colonel Walter Willis Chitty CMG CIE
- Reginald Gerard Leigh CMG CBE
- Robert Uchtred Eyre Knox DSO
- William Hope Fowler FRCSE
- Frederick Charles Ruddle.

==== Member of the Royal Victorian Order, 4th class (MVO) ====
- Lieutenant-Commander Eric Langton Woodhall RN (dated 8 August 1932).
- Owen Frederick Morshead DSO MC
- Reginald Stagg OBE

==== Member of the Royal Victorian Order, 5th class (MVO) ====
- Edward Wyndham Monkhouse MICE
- Andrew Sinclair Buchanan.
- William Johnston (dated 22 August 1932)
- Harry Mercer
- Henry Gulliver Barrett (dated 29 July 1932).

=== The Most Excellent Order of the British Empire ===
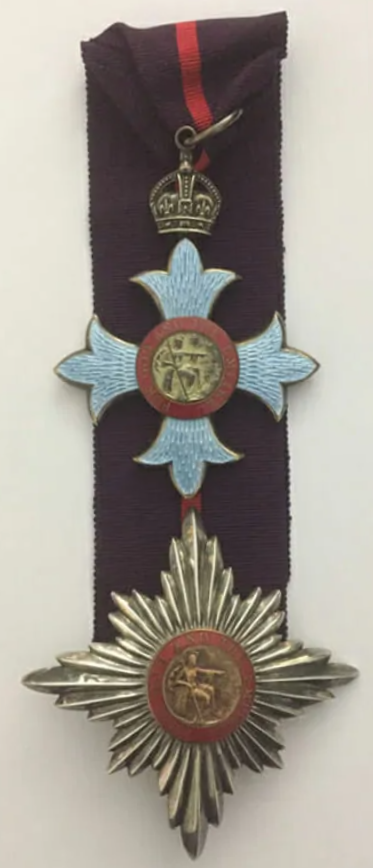
Knight Commander of the Order of the British Empire, insignia 1917–35

==== Knight Commander of the Order of the British Empire (KBE) ====
Civil Division

- Arthur James Dyke CB CBE Deputy Chairman of the Board of Customs and Excise.

Colonies, Protectorates, etc.

- Sir Gilbert Christopher Vyle, Past President of the Association of British Chambers of Commerce, and one of the Industrial Advisers of the United Kingdom Delegation at the Ottawa Conference.

British India

- Khan Bahadur Captain Sardar Sikandar Hayat Khan MBE Member of the Executive Council of the Governor of the Punjab.

==== Commander of the Order of the British Empire (CBE) ====
Military Division
Royal Navy

Army

- Lieutenant-Colonel and Brevet Colonel Louis Napoleon George Filon TD late Commanding University of London Contingent, Senior Division, Officers Training Corps.
- The Reverend George Standing DSO MC KHC Chaplain to the Forces, 1st Class, Royal Army Chaplains Department. Deputy Chaplain-General to the Forces, The War Office.

Civil Division

- Oswald Barclay JP DL For benefactions and public services in Edinburgh.
- Lieutenant-Colonel Alexander Stevenson Blair CMG TD JP DL WS Honorary Treasurer of the British Legion (Scotland) and Chairman of the Earl Haig Fund Committee since its formation.
- Reginald Blunt Founder and Honorary Secretary of the Chelsea Society. Chairman of the Finance Committee of the Cheyne Hospital for Children for fifty years. Trustee, Carlyle House, since 1895.
- Walter Willson Cobbett FRCM Compiler and Editor of the Cyclopaedic Survey of Chamber Music. Chairman of the Corporation of Trinity College of Music. Founder of the Cobbett Free Library of Chamber Music.
- Commander Alexander Guthrie Denniston OBE RNVR Head of a Department, Foreign Office.
- Oscar Follett Dowson OBE Assistant Legal Adviser, Home Office.
- Peter Macintyre Evans JP Vice-chairman of the Advisory Committee on the Welfare of the Blind.
- Robert Samuel Godfrey Surveyor and Clerk of the Works at Lincoln Cathedral.
- Jane Ewing Hannay OBE JP Member of the Scottish Savings Committee.
- Thomas Henderson FRSE FSA Scot JP Actuary, Glasgow Savings Bank. Honorary Secretary of the Trustee Savings Bank Association.
- Captain John Reid McLean OBE Commandant Metropolitan Special Constabulary.
- James Gracie Maddan, Postmaster-Surveyor, Manchester.
- Francis Hugh Adam Marshall FRS FRSE Fellow of Christ's College, Cambridge and Reader in Agricultural Physiology in the University.
- Edward Hugh Rhodes OBE Assistant Secretary, Ministry of Health.
- Sydney William Smith FIC FCS Chief Assayer, Royal Mint. President of the Institute of Mining and Metallurgy.
- George Thorpe JP Elected a member of the Board of the Co-operative Wholesale Society 1898. President of the Co-operative Wholesale Society 1920-1924. For services to the Co-operative Movement.
- Katharine Talbot Wallas. For services as a member of the late Unemployment Grants Committee.

Diplomatic Service and Overseas List

- Arthur Abbott, His Majesty's Consul-General at São Paulo.
- Arthur Horace Reid, Assistant Director-General of the Ottoman Bank.
- David John Rodgers, His Majesty's Consul at Liege, lately serving at San Salvador.

Colonies, Protectorates, etc.

- Edwin Abbott, Deputy Comptroller-General, Department of Trade and Customs, Commonwealth of Australia.
- Alice Baker, one of the founders of the Thomas Baker, Alice Baker, and Eleanor Shaw Medical Research Institute, Melbourne, Commonwealth of Australia.
- Mabel Balcombe Brookes. For charitable and philanthropic services in the State of Victoria.
- Tan Cheng Lock, Nominated Unofficial Member of the Legislative Council of the Straits Settlements. For public services.
- George Percival Newton, formerly Under-Secretary, Department of Internal Affairs, Dominion of New Zealand.
- John Rutherford Parkin Postlethwaite MBE lately Provincial Commissioner, Uganda Protectorate.
- Julian Ito Piggott OBE MC Manager, British Steel Export Association.
- Charles Robert Rennie, lately Provincial Commissioner, Northern Rhodesia.
- Colonel George Stops, Commissioner of the British South Africa Police, Southern Rhodesia.
- Kingsley Willans Stead OBE Director, Department of Customs, Excise and Trade, Palestine.
- Harold Augustin Tempany Director of Agriculture, Straits Settlements and Federated Malay States.
- Professor Hubert Edwin Whitfield, Vice-chancellor of the University, State of Western Australia.

British India

- Arthur Campbell Armstrong CIE OBE Indian Police Service, Deputy Inspector-General of Police (Crime and Railways), Central Provinces.
- John Dawson Tyson, Indian Civil Service, Private Secretary to His Excellency the Governor of Bengal.

==== Officer of the Order of the British Empire (OBE) ====
Military Division
Royal Navy

- Surgeon Commander William Harold Edgar RN
- Paymaster Captain Norman Scott Robertson RN (Retired).
- Headmaster George Anthony David Brown RN

Army

- Major (Commissary) Henry Joseph Cheetham MBE India Miscellaneous List, Officer Supervisor, Quarter Master General's Branch, Army Headquarters, India.
- Major Edward Francis Gwynne Davies MC Officer Commanding Johore Volunteer Engineers.
- Major Lowry Philip Payne-Gallwey MC 7th Queen's Own Hussars, Commanding 2nd (Nyasaland) Battalion, The King's African Rifles.
- Lieutenant-Colonel (Quarter-Master) William Macpherson, late Extra Regimentally Employed List, late Quarter-Master, Royal Hospital, Chelsea.
- Captain Eric John Roderick Mitchell, Machine Gun Company, Hong Kong Volunteer Defence Corps.
- Captain James Moffatt, 1st Kumaon Rifles, 19th Hyderabad Regiment, Indian Army, Chief Instructor, Kitchener College, Nowgong (to be dated 21 December 1932).
- Major William Ronald Campbell Penney MC Royal Corps of Signals, Brigade Major, Shanghai Area.
- Lieutenant-Colonel Joseph Elwin Bishop Scrafton, Supernumerary List, Indian Army, Cantonments Department, Inspecting Officer, Military Lands and Cantonments, Northern Command, India (to be dated 21 December 1932).
- Captain Douglas Stuart, 1st Battalion, 5th Mahratta Light Infantry, Indian Army, General Staff Officer, 2nd Grade, Headquarters, Lucknow District, India.
- Captain (Deputy Commissary) Arthur Edwin Ashton, Indian Corps of Clerks, Chief Clerk, Headquarters, Lahore District, India.
- Lieutenant Lionel Attwell Beale, Regular Army Reserve of Officers, Royal Corps of Signals (to be dated 21 December 1932).
- Lieutenant (Quarter-Master) Edgar Arthur Carter, Extra Regimentally Employed List, Clerk to the Overseas Defence Committee.
- Honorary Captain Faujdar Singh, Cantonments Department, Executive Officer, Class II, Rawalpindi, India.
- Captain Frederick Charles Trevett Lyall, The Royal Fusiliers (City of London Regiment), Station Staff Officer, 1st Class, Rawalpindi, India (to be dated 21 December 1932).
- Risaldar Noor Ahmed, No. 13 Army Transport Company (Mule), Indian Army Service Corps.
- Honorary Captain Peter Donald Pelpola, Assistant Adjutant, Ceylon Cadet Battalion, Ceylon Defence Force.
- Captain (Deputy Commissary) George Archibald Richards, Indian Corps of Clerks, Headquarters, Western Command, India (to be dated 21 December 1932).
- Major Percy Neil Sandways, India Medical Department, British Military Hospital, Trimulgherry, India.
- Major (Commissary) Hector Walsh, India Miscellaneous List, Officer Supervisor, Master-General of the Ordnance Branch, Army Headquarters, India.
- Second Lieutenant Harry Hector Adie Whitson, The Bombay Battalion, Auxiliary Force, India.

Civil Division

- Frederick William Abbott MVO MBE Chief Constable, Metropolitan Police.
- Robert Askew Assistant Chief Constable, Lancashire County Constabulary.
- Alderman Charles Aveling JP Chairman of the Southport Local Employment Committee since its formation.
- Alderman Francis James Ballard. Mayor of Dudley, 1927-28. For public services in Dudley.
- The Reverend Alfred Barrett. A member of the Monmouthshire County Council. For services to local government in Wales.
- Alfred Edward Baxter JP A member of the National Savings Committee.
- Vivian Harry Boyse MBE Accountant, Dominions and Colonial Offices.
- Thomas Chadwick MBE Accountant, His Majesty's Treasury.
- Margaret Elizabeth Cleeve. A senior member of the staff of the Royal Institute of International Affairs.
- Alfred Vincent Elsden MBE War Department Chemist, Royal Arsenal, Woolwich.
- Lilian Annie Margueretta Franklin MBE Lately Commandant of the First Aid Nursing Yeomanry Corps.
- Helen Gower JP Chairman of the Women's Unionist Association, Pontypool Division. For political and public services in Monmouthshire.
- John Hooper MBE Chief Technical Officer for Furniture, His Majesty's Office of Works and Public Buildings.
- Alice Mabel Erskine Jackson MBE Convener of the Women's Committee of the Eastern Divisional Council of the Scottish Unionist Association. For political and public services.
- Thomas Gwynfab James MBE A member of the National Savings Committee.
- Edward Knox JP Chairman of the Frome Rural District Council.
- Harry Wesson Longley, Director of Stamping, Board of Inland Revenue.
- Alexander McCallum Senior Inspector for Agricultural Education, Department of Agriculture for Scotland.
- Alick Henry Herbert Maclean Secretary, Girls Public Day School Trust.
- Donald James Macleod Honorary Chieftain, Gaelic Society of Inverness. For services to Gaelic studies.
- John Palmer Scott Main MIMechE Assistant to the Chief Inspecting Officer of Railways, Ministry of Transport.
- Charles Henry Martin Late Assistant Registrar-General.
- Winifred Mercier Principal, Whitelands Training College, Putney.
- Charles James Mills, Superintending Inspector, Board of Customs and Excise.
- William Cleverly Osmond, Deputy Director of Training, Ministry of Labour.
- Fred Pickering MBE JP One of the Magistrates for the City of Bradford; Deputy Chairman of the Unemployment Committee; Chairman of the local Income Tax Commissioners. For public services in Bradford.
- Edward Llewellyn Pickles MBE Assistant Director of Contracts, Air Ministry.
- Ewart Watson Ravenshear Principal, Mines Department of the Board of Trade.
- Violet Roberta Stewart-Richardson. Establishment Clerk, Treasurer's Office, Buckingham Palace.
- John Robertson Chief Constable of Renfrew and Bute. James Charles Stibbs Assistant Accountant-General, India Office.
- Frederick Henry Taylor, Chief Staff Officer, Board of Trade.
- Florence Thorneycroft. For political and public services in Staffordshire.
- Frederic Weston, Superintending Naval Store Officer, His Majesty's Dockyard, Devonport.
- Commander Alfred James Windebank JP RNR (retired). Chairman of the Herefordshire War Pensions Committee.

Diplomatic Service and Overseas List

- Falconer Evans Crowe, Retiring President of the British Chamber of Commerce in Switzerland.
- Agnes Gibson MBE Headmistress of St. Andrew's School for Girls, Alexandria.
- Douglas Newbold, District Commissioner, Sudan.
- Arthur Joseph Pack, Commercial Secretary at His Majesty's Embassy at Santiago.
- Douglas Gerald Rydings, His Majesty's Vice-Consul at Paris, lately serving at Monrovia, Liberia.
- Robert Charles Owen-Wells MBE formerly British Agent and Secretary on the Anglo-Turkish Mixed Arbitral Tribunal.

Colonies, Protectorates, etc.

- Arthur Edward Victor Barton, Collector of Customs and Excise, Colony of Trinidad and Tobago.
- Harry Blackmore VD Director of Education, Sierra Leone.
- August Bolle, Loans Officer, Department of the Treasury, Commonwealth of Australia.
- Edith Charlotte Onians. For child welfare work in the State of Victoria.
- John Thomas Bradley Chief Medical Officer, Seychelles.
- Frank Cecil Clarkson MBE Commissioner of the Virgin Islands.
- Frederick James Durman, Assistant Chief Secretary, Tanganyika Territory.
- John Medlicott Ellis, Colonial Secretary, Falkland Islands.
- Alexander Murdoch Fraser, Elected Member of the Legislative Council of Saint Vincent. For public services.
- Joseph Trounsell Gilbert MBE Assistant Chief Secretary, Zanzibar.
- William Harold Ingrams, Assistant Colonial Secretary, Mauritius.
- William Marston Logan, Principal Assistant Commissioner for Local Government Lands and Settlement, Kenya.
- Sheffield Airey Neave Assistant Director, Imperial Institute of Entomology.
- Max Nurock, Assistant Secretary, Palestine.
- Charlotte Purnell MS For long and devoted medical work amongst the Arabs in Palestine and Trans-Jordan.
- Eric Slack Medical Officer, Leper Settlement, Botshabelo, Basutoland.
- Harry Lester Smith, Chief Clerk, Office of the High Commissioner for South Africa.
- George Alexander Whitlam, Officer in the Prime Minister's Department, Commonwealth of Australia.
- Thomas Traill Smellie, Unofficial Member of the Executive and Legislative Councils of British Guiana. For public services.
- John Smith MRCVS Director of Animal Health and Acting Secretary for Agriculture, Northern Rhodesia.
- Robert Stanley Taylor East African Medical Service. Principal Medical Officer, Somaliland Protectorate.

British India

- Douglas Eric Augier, Indian Opium Department, Joint Opium Officer for Central India and Rajputana, Joint Scheme States, Central India.
- Denzil Harold Cowper, Jail Department, Superintendent, Karachi District Prison, Bombay.
- Khan Bahadur Kuli Khan; Provincial Civil Service, Supernumerary Assistant Commissioner and Publicity. Officer, North-West Frontier Province.
- Hector Ian Macdonald MBE Director, Regulations and Forms, Army Department, Government of India.
- Mitharam Pribhdas Mathrani, Indian Service of Engineers, Executive Engineer, Left Works Division, Lloyd Barrage Circle, Sukkur, Bombay.
- Harry Willoughby Oddin Taylor AMICE Indian Service of Engineers, Executive Engineer, Right Works Division, Lloyd Barrage Circle, Sukkur, Bombay.

Honorary Officers

- Musa Effendi El Alami, Assistant Government Advocate, Palestine.

==== Member of the Order of the British Empire (MBE) ====
Military Division
Royal Navy

- Shipwright Lieutenant Walter Thomas Ford Miller RN
- Commissioned Engineer Victor Gordon Scott DSM RN
- Senior Chief Officer (Shore Wireless Service) Francis Weaver Johnston RN

Civil Division

- John William Bateman Adams Headmaster, Christ Church Senior School, Hampshire.
- Albert George Banks, Clerical Officer, Cabinet Office.
- Henry James Frederick Barber, member of the staff of the Conservative Central Office for the past 28 years. For political services.
- Sydney Charles Barham, Acting Assistant Accountant, Ministry of Health.
- Edwin Percy Bennett Chief Superintendent, Birmingham City Police.
- Edward Abel Ely Engineer and Manager of the Crinan Canal, Ministry of Transport.
- Nina Mary Popham Blyth. Juvenile Court Probation Officer.
- Thomas Atkinson Bourne, Accountant, Board of Customs and Excise.
- Walter Thomas Brattle, Superintendent Storekeeper, Lambeth Police Store.
- William Henry Cann. Principal Clerk, Post Office Savings Bank Department.
- George William Collins, Superintendent, Metropolitan Police.
- Jessie Reid Crosbie, Headmistress, Infants Department, Salisbury Council School, Liverpool.
- William Percival Daniels, Civil Assistant to the Director of Naval Ordnance, Admiralty.
- Elizabeth Date Davis (Sister Lillie Davis). Founded the Sister Lillie Shelter at Silloth, Cumberland. For her services in Carlisle and District.
- John Hanks Day, Controller, Maidstone Centre, Observer Corps (Maidstone Special Constabulary).
- Richard Deacon, Clerk, Higher Grade, Board of Inland Revenue.
- George William Downs, Chief Superintendent, Nottingham City Police.
- Leah Francesca Mary Edmonds, Administrative Assistant, War Office.
- William Eyre, Confidential Shorthand Writer, Board of Trade.
- Percy Lovell Godley, Chief Superintendent, Control Division, Ordnance Survey, Southampton.
- Arthur Clement Hamilton, Staff Officer, Air Ministry.
- Frederick George Hanham, Second Class Officer, Ministry of Labour.
- Mabel Molyneux Hankins, Headmistress, Grayhurst Road Senior Girls School, Shoreditch.
- Wilfrid John Hewkley, Superintending Estate Surveyor, His Majesty's Office of Works & Public Buildings.
- Percy Reginald Clive Hidden, Officer in Charge of Ministry of Pensions Archives Registry, Hollinwood.
- William Frederick Jacobs, Superintendent, Hampshire County Constabulary.
- Mary Eleanor Elizabeth James JP In recognition of her public service in the Borough of Bethnal Green.
- Horace John Johns, Staff Officer, Ministry of Agriculture and Fisheries.
- Frederick William Judge, Rating Officer, Ipswich County Borough.
- James Hamilton Kelly JP For political and public services in the West of Scotland.
- Robert Ponton Kerr, Staff Clerk, War Office.
- Walter Kettle, Clerk, Higher Grade, lately of the Joint Substitution Board (Treasury and Ministry of Labour).
- Thomas Kidd AMInstCE Chairman of the Burton-on-Trent, Lichfield and District. War Pensions Committee.
- Robert John Lawrence, Higher Executive-Officer (Acting), Export Credits Guarantee Department.
- Thomas Smeeton Leah. For services in connection with the National Mark Beef Scheme.
- Hilda Victoria Emily Hart Lupton, Clerical Officer, Board of Trade.
- Sidney Alfred Lynn, First Class Clerk, Royal Courts of Justice.
- Jane McDermont, FEIS, a Mistress at James Gillespie's High School for Girls, Edinburgh.
- Angus Macdonald, lately Superintendent Relieving Officer, Camberwell Board of Guardians.
- (Lorna) Eilidh Louisa MacDougall. For services in connection with the Mary Leaf Fund established for promoting the welfare of women and girls in the Metropolitan Police District.
- Henry McLeod, Superintendent, Higher Grade, East Central District Office, General Post Office.
- Mary Stuart Miller, Chief Juvenile Employment Officer of the Birmingham Local Education Authority.
- Dorothy Newcombe. In recognition of her work for the patients at the Ministry of Pensions Hospitals in Newcastle.
- Francis William Norledge, Securities Officer, Public Trustee Office.
- Charles Petty, Shipping Master, Armament Supply Department, Admiralty.
- Lilian Alice Annie Plincke, Chief Superintendent of Typists, Board of Education.
- Anna Albertina Isabel Pollard, Chief Inspector of Midwives and Superintendent of Health Visitors, County Council of Middlesex.
- Caroline Wingfield Raxworthy, Chairman of the Children's Sub-Committee of the Guildford, Aldershot and District War Pensions Committee.
- Charles Frederick Stuart, Inspector, Office of the Inspector-General of Waterguard, Board of Customs and Excise.
- Robert Sweeney, Superintendent, Central Division, Glasgow City Police.
- Alfred Ernest Thomas, Secretary, Middlesbrough Juvenile Organisations Committee.
- William Henry Walton, Chief Superintendent, Mercantile Marine Office, Board of Trade, Newcastle.
- Thomas Skinner Ward In recognition of his services to the Ministry of Pensions Hospitals in the Glasgow area.
- Maurice Arthur Willis, Clerical Officer, Dominions Office.

Diplomatic Service and Overseas List

- Bimbashi Alexander Dugald Fraser, Inspector, Cairo City Police.
- Edward William Longworth Knocker, employed in the Department of the Commercial Counsellor at His Majesty's Embassy at Rome.
- Frederick William Shirley, British Consular Agent, Minia.
- Mildred Walkley, a British resident, and worker for charity, in Khartoum.

Colonies, Protectorates, etc.

- Maurice Bookham, Deputy Assistant Superintendent of Prisons, Colony of Trinidad and Tobago.
- Montague-Brown, Chief Clerk, Department of Agriculture and Forests, Palestine.
- William Brown, Superintendent of Police, Gibraltar.
- John Coelho, Assistant Crown Surveyor and Assistant Engineer, Public Works Department, Gibraltar.
- May Evans, Senior Nursing Sister, Nursing Home, Baghdad, Iraq.
- Thomas Richard Ginger MC Inspector of Water Supplies, Public Works Department, Kenya.
- Georgina Rose Johnson, Superintendent of Female Education, Zanzibar.
- Margaret Lowe. For social welfare work in Northern Rhodesia.
- Evangeline Louise Peries. For social welfare work in Ceylon.
- Thomas Irwin Potter. For public services in the Colony of Trinidad and Tobago.
- Shankar Rao Eranna Furam, Sub-Assistant Surgeon, Tanganyika Territory.
- Aubrey Harris Silver, Bandmaster, Department of Police and Prisons, Palestine.
- Subadar Kishen Singh, Medical Department, Kenya.
- Robert Burnell Skinner, Treasurer and Collector of Customs, Antigua, and Federal Treasurer, Leeward Islands.
- William James Walker, lately Town Clerk of Kingston and St. Andrew, Jamaica. For public services.
- Henry Nevill Williams, Assistant Engineer, Irrigation Department, Iraq.
- Herbert Frank Wilton, Head Keeper, Hamilton Gaol, Bermuda.

British India

- Chamier Birch, Superintendent, Political Branch, North-West Frontier Province Secretariat.
- Alfred Bux, Superintendent of Accounts, Office of the Private Secretary to the Governor of the United Provinces.
- Richard Joseph Henry Fitzpatrick, Inspector-General of Police, Tonk State, Rajputana.
- Joseph Leonard Jaques (retired), Deputy Collector and lately President of the First Class Bench Court, Calicut, Malabar District, Madras.
- Rai Bahadur Sohan Lai, lately of the Punjab Civil Service, Secretary, Municipal Committee, Delhi.
- James John Minto, Principal Foreman, Kirkee Arsenal.
- Sheikh Faiz Muhammad MLC of Dera Ghazi Khan, Punjab.
- Charles Henry Francis Pereira, Assistant Secretary to the Government of India in the Legislative Department.
- William Mathew Schutte Indian Agricultural Service, Agricultural Engineer to the Government of Bombay.
- James Woolley VD Assistant Commissioner of Police, Headquarters, Lalbazar, Calcutta, Bengal.

Honorary Members

- Michaelaki Shishmanoglou, Assistant Senior Medical Officer of Health, Palestine.

=== Members of the Order of the Companions of Honour (CH) ===
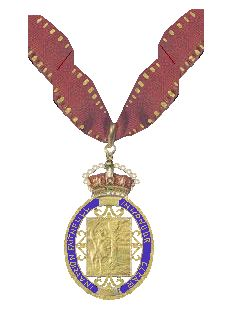
The riband and badge of the "Companions of Honour"

- The Reverend Philip Thomas Byard Clayton MC FSA Vicar of All Hallows, Barking-by-the-Tower. Founder of Talbot House.
- The Reverend John Scott Lidgett President of the Methodist Church. Honorary Secretary of the National Council of Evangelical Free Churches of England and Wales since 1914. Vice-chancellor of London University 1930-31 and 1931-32. Warden of the Bermondsey Settlement since 1891.

=== Kaisar-i-Hind Medal ===
First Class

- Deaconess Jane Blissett Bardsley, Church of England Zenana Mission, Katni, Central Provinces.
- Sister Dorothy Frances Honorary Principal, Diocesan College, Calcutta, Bengal.
- Charlotte Rose Greenfield, Medical Officer in charge of St. Margaret's Hospital, Poona, Bombay.
- Agatha Rosalie, Lady Innes (wife of Sir Charles Innes, lately Governor of Burma).
- M. R. Ry. Tiruvarur Swaminatha Ayyar Ramaswami Ayyar Avargal, lately President, Corporation of Madras.
- Muazzim Husain Muhammad Furrokh, Bengal Civil Service, Sub-Divisional Officer, Tangail, Mymensingh District, Bengal.
- M. R. Ry. Rao Sahib Gidugu Venkata Ramamurti Pantulu Garu, Parlakimidi, Ganjam District, Madras.
- Robert Harold Hull Goheen, Medical Missionary in charge of the American Presbyterian Mission Hospital at Vengurla, Ratnagiri District, Bombay.
- The Right Reverend Kenneth William Stewart Kennedy Bishop of Chota Nagpur, Bihar and Orissa.
- The Reverend Williams Sherratt, lately Secretary, British and Foreign Bible Society, Burma.

=== British Empire Medal (BEM) ===
Military Division
For Meritorious Service

- Sergeant William Dunlop Carroll, Royal Army Service Corps, Military Headquarters, Shanghai Area.

Civil Division
For Gallantry

- Mirghany Ahmed Mohammed. Citation: "On September 18th, 1932, at the height of the Nile flood, and at a point where the stream is particularly dangerous even for the strongest swimmer, Mirghany Ahmed rescued three girls, the eldest fifteen years of age, from certain death by drowning."

For Meritorious Service

- Charles Crunden Phelps. Chief Inspector, Metropolitan Special Constabulary Reserve.
- Thomas Lister. Civilian Clerk to Commander, Royal Artillery, 47th (2nd London) Division, Territorial Army.
- Harry Whent. Clerk, War Department Experimental Establishment, Shoeburyness.
- Frank Ray, Head Gardener and Caretaker, Imperial War Graves Commission, France.
- Mir Alam Khan. Sub-Inspector of Indian Police, Admiralty Dockyard, Hong Kong.
- Osman Suleiman. Permanent Way Foreman, Sudan Railways.
- Saleh Allagabo. Chief of Wan Town, Sudan. Lately Bash Shawi'sh (Sergeant-Major) Ba-hr el Ghazal Province Police Force.
- Hamid Effendi Abdulla Sol (Warrant Officer) Kordofan Province Police, Sudan.
- Mahmoud Effendi Abd El Karim. Assistant Superintendent of Customs, Sudan.
- Frank Fletcher. Reserve Inspector of Police, United Provinces, India.
- Frederick George Peters DCM Reserve Inspector of Police, Nagpur, Central Provinces, India.
- Oliver Alexander Chidgey. Messenger and personal attendant to successive Prime Ministers of the Commonwealth of Australia since 1921, and Principal Messenger to the Federal Cabinet.
- Raymond John Tracy. Chauffeur to the Prime Minister of the Commonwealth of Australia.
- Previously Chauffeur to Ministers of the Commonwealth since 1919.
- Joshua Constant. Lately 3rd Class Officer, Prison Service, Trinidad.
- Savvas Papanicolaou. Mukhtar of Stroumbi, Paphos District, Cyprus.

=== Air Force Cross ===
- Flight Lieutenant Eric Delano Barnes.
- Flight Lieutenant Charles Howard Cahill.

=== Air Force Medal ===
- Sergeant (Pilot) Ernest Charles Kidd.
- Sergeant (Pilot) James Hughes Jones.

=== King's Police Medal (KPM) ===
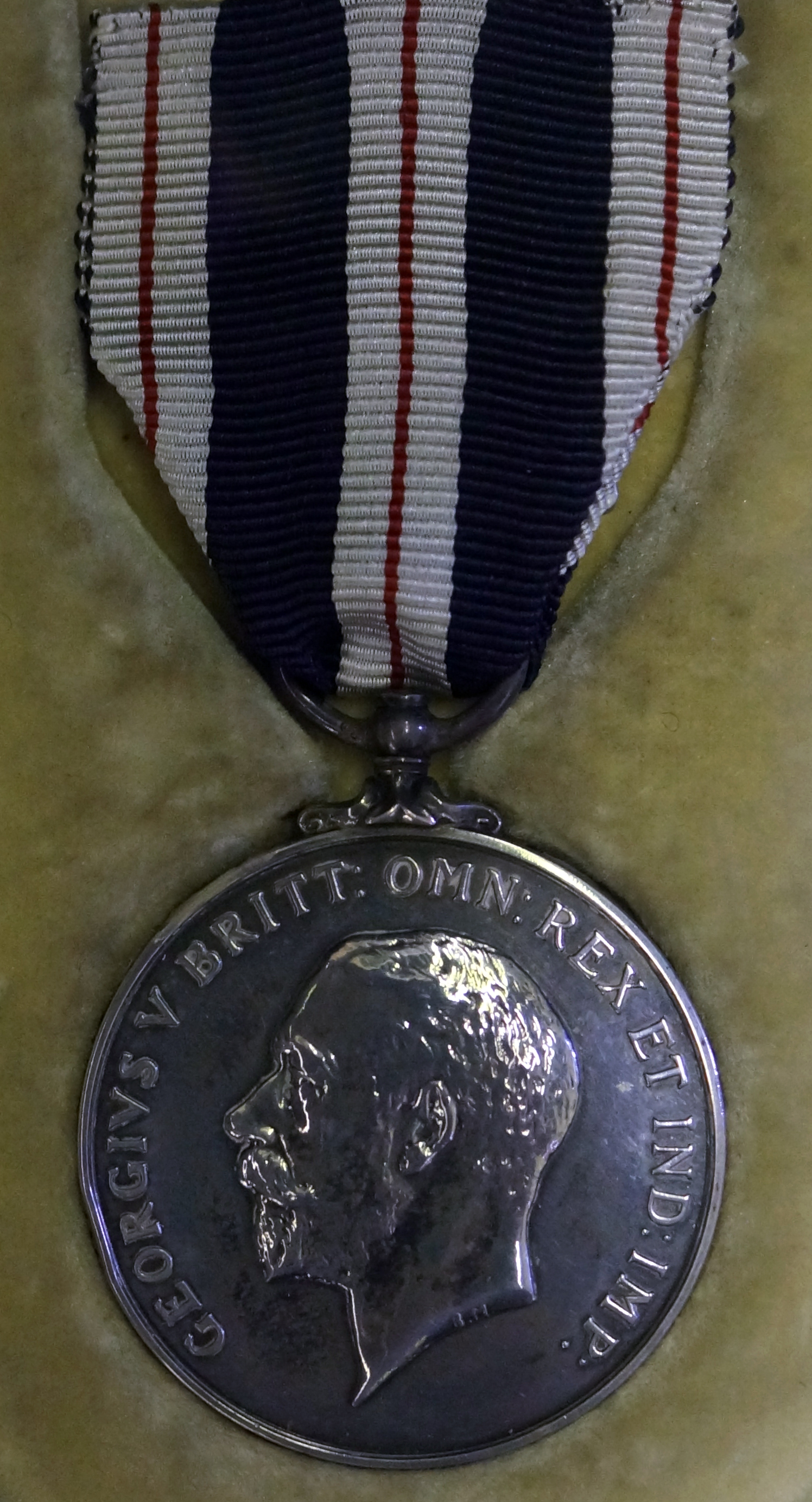
King's Police Medal with the riband for gallantry

For Gallantry

England and Wales

- Thomas Danby, Chief Constable, of the Liberty of Peterborough constabulary and of the Peterborough City Police Force.
- Captain Archibald Frederick Hordern AFC Chief Constable of the East Riding of Yorkshire.
- Thomas Bell, Chief Constable, Bootle Borough Police Force.
- Captain Alberto Charles Dawson, Chief Constable, Birkenhead Borough Police Force
- Frederic Edward Crack, Chief Superintendent, Hull City Police Force.
- Joseph Adams, Superintendent, Staffordshire Constabulary.
- Gilbert Alexander McDowall, Superintendent, West Riding of Yorkshire Constabulary.
- Edward Seymour Woodeson MBE Superintendent and Deputy Chief Constable, Norfolk Constabulary.
- William Francis Milsom, Superintendent, Worcestershire Constabulary.
- Arthur Thompson, Superintendent, Leeds City Police Force.
- Harry Battley, Chief Inspector, Metropolitan Police Force.
- George Duncan, Chief Inspector, Metropolitan Police Force.
- Walter Calver, Sub-Divisiona, Inspector, Metropolitan Police Force.
- William Cain, Detective Inspector, Metropolitan Police Force.
- Robert Wallen, Sergeant, Metropolitan Police Force.
- Collingwood Arnold, Sergeant, Eastbourne Borough Police Force.
- Herbert Cockburn, Constable, Metropolitan Police Force.
- Sidney Pattenden, lately Constable, Metropolitan Police Force.
- Alfred Scheide, Constable, Metropolitan Police Force.
- Robert Swan, Constable, Metropolitan Police Force.
- Herbert. Hayes, Constable, Lancashire Constabulary.
- James. Tinlin, Constable, Northumberland Constabulary.
- Edgar Harold Olpin, Constable, Somerset Constabulary.
- William Alexander Marr, Constable, Oldham Borough Police Force.
- Cyril Simmons, Constable, Eastbourne Borough Police Force.
- William MacKay, Deputy Firemaster, Dundee.

Scotland

- James Lowden, Chief Constable, Ayr Burgh Police Force.

Australia

- Arthur Leary, Metropolitan Superintendent, New South Wales Police Force.
- William John MacKay, Metropolitan Superintendent, New South Wales Police Force.
- Christopher George Digby, Fourth Officer, Board of Fire Commissioners, New South Wales.
- James Sorlie, Divisional Inspector, Board of Fire Commissioners, New South Wales.
- Albert Henry Jackson, Senior Constable, Tasmanian Police Force.

Union of South Africa

- Diederik Johannes Steyn, Lance-Sergeant, South African Police Force.

British India

- Frederick Douglas Bartley CBE Deputy Commissioner of Police, Bengal. (bar to the King's Police Medal)
- Narindar Singh, Sub-Inspector, Punjab Police. (bar to the King's Police Medal)
- Shaik Jamal Ahmad, Head Constable, Madras Police.
- Cecil Justin Philomen Pinto, Inspector, Madras Police.
- Ramaswami Pillai Muthuswami Pillai, Constable, Madras Police.
- Lalkhan Abdullakhan, Head Constable, Bombay Police.
- Babaji Jiwaji, Head Constable, Bombay Police.
- George Edward Hartnup, Sergeant, Bombay Police.
- Walter Robert George Smith, Deputy Commissioner of Police, Bombay.
- Harold Edwin Butler, Deputy Commissioner of Police, Bombay.
- Michael Edward Guider, Deputy Commissioner of Police, Bombay.
- Jnanendra Nath De, Head Constable, Bengal Police.
- Lal Muhammad Joarder, Officiating Assistant Sub-Inspector, Bengal Police.
- Jamadar Singh, Constable, Bengal Police.
- Deoraj Ram, Constable, Bengal Police.
- Berhamdeo Singh, Constable, Bengal Police.
- Henrick Ericksen Hansen, Deputy Commissioner of Police, Bengal.
- Bhujendra Nath Sarker, Inspector, Bengal Police.
- Mafizuddin Ahmed, Officiating Inspector, Bengal Police.
- Sasadhar Mazumdar, Officiating Inspector, Bengal Police.
- Denys Pilditch, Assistant to the Deputy Inspector General of Police, Criminal Investigation Department, United Provinces.
- Pirthi Singh, Constable, United Provinces Police.
- Sheikh Edu, Naik, United Provinces Police.
- Ram Rattan Singh, Officiating Deputy Superintendent, United Provinces Police.
- Sarwar Khan, Constable, Punjab Police.
- Khem Singh, Constable, Punjab Police.
- Kishan Chand, Constable, Government Railway Police, Punjab.
- Dayal Singh, Head Constable, Punjab Police.
- Teo Hmong IDSM Subedar, Burma Military Police.
- Nazir Singh Lama, Subedar, Burma Military Police.
- Captain Lawrence Gamble Burma Military Police.
- Captain Eugene Daniel McCarthy OBE Burma Military Police.
- Boota Singh, Jemadar, Burma Military Police.
- U Tun Tin, Sub-Inspector, Burma Police.
- Rai Sahib Ajit Kumar Ganguli, Inspector of Police, Criminal Investigation Department, Bihar and Orissa.
- Khagendra Nath Chatterji, Sub-Inspector, Bihar and Orissa Police.
- Ram Bahadur Singh, Constable, Bihar and Orissa Police.
- Clarence James Creed MC Superintendent, Bihar and Orissa Police.
- Frank Herbert Graham Taylor, Superintendent, Central Provinces Police.
- Vernon Thomas Bay ley, Assistant Superintendent, North-West Frontier Province Police.
- Mohammad Nazir Khan, Sub-Inspector, North-West Frontier Province Police.
- Abbas Ali, Assistant Sub-Inspector, North-West Frontier Province Police.
- Abdul Rauf, Officiating Assistant Sub-Inspector, North-West Frontier Province Police.
- Mir Afzal, Lance Head Oonstable, North-West Frontier Province Police.
- Rab Nawaz, Constable, North-West Frontier Province Police.
- Gul Badshah, Head Constable, Baluchistan Police.
- Basil Churton Taylor, Inspector General, Indore State Police.
- Bhagwan Singh, Superintendent, Patiala State Police.

Colonies, Protectorates and Mandated Territories

- Stanley Charles Sinclair, Assistant Commissioner of Police, Gold Coast. (for gallantry)
- Adolphus Harry Leeves, British Inspector of Police, Palestine. (for gallantry)
- Audu Zaria, First Class Constable, Nigeria Police Force.
- Douglas John Gerrard Hennessy, Superintendent of Police, Ceylon.
- Eustice Forbes Lanyon Penno, Assistant Commissioner of Police, Gold Coast.
- Peter Grant, Chief Inspector of Police, Hong Kong.
- Wilfred Edmund Power, Inspector of Constabulary and Superintendent of the Port-of-Spain Fire Brigade, Trinidad.
- Philip Nathaniel Kendall, Sergeant Major of Constabulary attached to the Port-of-Spain Fire Brigade, Trinidad.
- Qaid Sudqi Bey Qasim, Commandant, Belqa District, Arab Legion, Trans-Jordan.

His Majesty has also graciously consented to the King's Police Medal being handed to the next-of-kin of the deceased officers whose names appear below, and who would have received the decoration had they survived:

- Narathoo, lately Jemadar of Peons in the Foreign and Political Department, Government of India.
