= Reparagen =

Joint health product

Reparagen is a joint health product that scientists at Albany Medical College ran clinical trials on to test the theory that the combination of Uncaria guianensis and Lepidium meyenii can turn on Insulin-like growth factor
