= Robert Skinner =

Robert or Bob Skinner may refer to:

- Robert Skinner (bishop) (1591–1670), English bishop of (successively) Bristol, Oxford, and Worcester
- Robert Peet Skinner (1866–1960), U.S. diplomat
- Robert T. Skinner (1867–1946), Scottish mathematician, historical author and antiquarian
- Robert Burnell Skinner (1893–1969), British colonial administrator
- Robert J. Skinner, United States Air Force general
- Bob Skinner (1931–2026), American baseball player
- Bob Skinner, fictional Scottish policeman in the novels of Quintin Jardine
