= Adrian Sandra Dobs =

American endocrinologist

- Education: Cornell University (B.S., 1974), Albany Medical College (M.D., 1978)
- Scientific career
- Fields: Internal medicine, Endocrinology
- Workplaces: Johns Hopkins University
- Website: www.hopkinsmedicine.org/profiles/details/adrian-dobs

Adrian Sandra Dobs is an American internal medicine and endocrinology physician, Professor of Medicine and Oncology at Johns Hopkins University, Director of the Johns Hopkins Clinical Research Network, and co-director of the Johns Hopkins Center to Reduce Cancer Disparities. Her clinical practice is focused on sex hormone disorders in both men and women, and her research focus is on male gonadal function particularly new forms of male hormone replacement therapy and aging.

== Education ==
Dobs received her M.D. from Albany Medical College in 1978. She completed a medical residency and was selected to be a Chief Resident at Albert Einstein College of Medicine, and completed both research and clinical fellowships in endocrinology and metabolism at Johns Hopkins Hospital.

== Career and research ==
In 2005, Dobs was promoted to Professor at Johns Hopkins University. From 2005 to 2015 she served as Vice Chair of Medicine for Faculty Development in the Department of Medicine at Johns Hopkins Hospital.

Dobs' research has focused primarily on disorders of male gonadal function, with over 250 published works. She has also provided opinion on clinical research in the scientific literature.

== Select media ==
- 1995 Washington Post story "FDA Approves Patch for Low Testosterone"
- 2016 Newsweek story "Meet the Canadian Athlete Changing Sports' Attitude to Gender"
- 2019 ABC News story "Lovingly, a family raises an intersex child - again"
- 2020 NBC News story "Testosterone treatment should be given only for sexual dysfunction, guideline suggests"
- 2021 Discover article "Why It's Harder for Many Transgender People to Access (and Trust) COVID-19 Vaccines"
