= Sally Temple =

American neuroscientist

- Education: Cambridge University, University College London, Columbia University
- Awards: MacArthur Fellows Program Jacob Javitz Merit Award Citizen Laureate Award
- Scientific career
- Fields: Neuroscience
- Workplaces: Albany Medical College

Sally Temple is an American developmental neuroscientist in Albany, New York. She is a co-founder and scientific director for The Neural Stem Cell Institute and is a professor of Neuroscience and Neuropharmacology at Albany Medical College Temple is also the principal investigator in her laboratory that focuses on neural stem cells and therapies for neurological-related disorders

== Life ==
Temple received her B.A. from Cambridge University. She then continued her PhD education at the University College London and competed her postdoctoral fellowship at Columbia University. Her focus at this time was on optic nerve development.

Temple became a pioneer in the field of stem cell research when she discovered that the embryonic mammalian brain contained a rare stem-like cell. After this discovery, she focused on neural stem cells and how they develop over time and produce progeny.

She has since been labelled an innovator in the field of stem cells, specifically neural stem cells, which are potentially applicable in cell replacement therapy for ailments like spinal cord injury and neurodegeneration. She is the president and co-founder of StemCulture, LLC., a company created by scientists in order to create innovative products and promote scientific research.

In 2010 she and John J. Nigro were recipients of the 2010 Citizen Laureate Awards. This award is meant to recognize leaders in the fields of business, industry, government, and academia.

Previously, she was a fellow of the Alden March Bioethics Institute.

Temple currently is the scientific director of the Neural Stem Cell Institute. She also is a faculty member for Albany Medical College, Rensselaer Polytechnic Institute, and SUNY Albany. Dr. Temple is married to Dr. Jeffrey Stern, a retinal surgeon, who is the other co-founder of the Regenerative Research Foundation and Neural Stem Cell Institute.

She is a member of the Editorial Board for Developmental Cell.

== Research ==
Temple's current laboratory focuses primarily on neural stem cells and the development for therapies related to eye, brain, and spinal cord disorders.

One of her major accomplishments in her field is the isolation and culturing of a progenitor cell line of glia. This led to the discovery that the number of cell divisions the cell underwent was determined by internal counting mechanisms. This research also led to her indicating specific markers on progenitor cell lines and external signaling molecules that are involved in the maintenance of neural stem cells.

Some of her other research has indicated that the limited success of embryonic stem cell transplants in neurological cases may be due to the introduction of cells at the wrong developmental stage. This may have a huge impact on neurological therapies using stem cells as a future of medicine.

She has also provided evidence in her field that has shown that progenitor cells gradually lose the ability to divide. She established that the Foxg1 gene is important in this, because a reduction in its expression results in a delay in this process.

As president of StemCulture, LLC. she is currently working on a new study involving a new product, StemBeads FGF2. StemCulture, LLC. describe this product as a growth factor supplement that is able to grow FGF2 dependent stem cell cultures in a more efficient way. She also recently identified an important human central nervous stem cell that may lead to important developments in retinal disease treatments. In 2015, she attended a RPI stem cell and bioengineering meeting and spoke about her retinal pigmented epithelial (RPE) research. She discussed how her team has been furthering their research into culturing human retinal stem cells and the use of RPE cells in therapy for age-related macular degeneration.

=== Patents ===
Temple has a large number of patents related to neural stem cells and for various methods for culture undifferentiated cells.

== Awards ==
In 2003 Dr. Temple received the Jacob Javitz Merit Award from the National Institute of Health. She was then awarded the MacArthur Fellowship in 2008. This award in considered a no-strings attached grant intended to supplement the winner's potential for creativity. Dr. Temple was also the recipient of the 2010 Citizen Laureate Awards. This was awarded to her by The University at Albany Foundation for her research into treatments for both macular degeneration and Parkinson's disease.

== Publications ==
- Spred1, a negative regulator of Ras-MAPK-ERK, is enriched in CNS germinal zones, dampens NSC proliferation, and maintains ventricular zone structure. Phoenix TN, Temple S. Genes Dev. 2010 Jan 1;24(1):45-56.
- The timing of cortical neurogenesis is encoded within lineages of individual progenitor cells. Shen Q, Wang Y, Dimos JT, Fasano CA, Phoenix TN, Lemischka IR, Ivanova NB, Stifani S, Morrisey EE, Temple S. Nat Neurosci. 2006 Jun;9(6):743-51. Epub 2006 May 7.
- LeX is expressed by principle progenitor cells in the embryonic nervous system, is secreted into their environment and binds Wnt-1. Capela A, Temple S. Dev Biol. 2006 Mar 15;291(2):300-13. Epub 2006 Feb 3.
- Asymmetric distribution of EGFR receptor during mitosis generates diverse CNS progenitor cells. Sun Y, Goderie SK, Temple S. Neuron. 2005 Mar 24;45(6):873-86.
- LeX/ssea-1 is expressed by adult mouse CNS stem cells, identifying them as nonependymal. Capela A, Temple S. Neuron. 2002 Aug 29;35(5):865-75.
