= William H. Oldendorf =

American physician

William Henry Oldendorf (March 27, 1925 – December 14, 1992) was an American neurologist, physician, researcher, medical pioneer, founding member of the American Society for Neuroimaging (ASN), and originator of the technique of computed tomography.

== Early life ==
William "Bill" Oldendorf was born in 1925, the youngest of four children, in Schenectady, New York. According to his sister Dorothy, William developed an interest in science and imaging through his fascination with telescopes. While still in high school, he placed one on the front sidewalk of their abode and studied the stars late into the night.

=== Academic education ===
Oldendorf graduated from high school at the age of 15 and afterwards attended Union College in Schenectady, New York—completing premedical studies in just 3 years. He received his medical degree from the Albany Medical College in Albany, New York in 1947.

=== Medical training ===
Following medical internship at Ellis Hospital in Schenectady, Oldendorf completed a residency in psychiatry through the New York State Department of Mental Health Residency Training Program. Then he enlisted for active duty in the United States Navy as a medical officer and was posted at the U.S. Naval Hospital in Newport, Rhode Island. Two years later Oldendorf left the Navy to complete a fellowship in neurology at the University of Minnesota Hospitals in Minneapolis, Minnesota; for this reason, he was subsequently certified by the American Board of Psychiatry and Neurology as a diplomate in both specialties.

== Professional career ==
In 1956, Oldendorf joined the faculty of the new medical school at the University of California, Los Angeles and the staff of the nearby UCLA-affiliated West Los Angeles Veterans Administration Medical Center. He became an active member of the academic community, where his scientific, clinical, and teaching abilities were admired at the bedside, in seminars, at clinical conferences, in the auditorium, and in his laboratory. He engaged students and colleagues in long discussions about neurologic theory, the scientific process, or results of medical research. By 1959, Oldendorf was an attending neurologist at the Wadsworth VA-UCLA Medical Center where his ability to apply techniques from one field to another did not go unnoticed. He was universally characterized as "likable", "friendly", "amusing", "creative", "intense", and "humble".

Oldendorf's interest neuroimaging was precipitated by a dislike for invasive procedures (like pneumoencephalography and direct carotid puncture) that he performed as a clinical neurologist. Oldendorf found that these traumatic, tedious tests provided only limited and indirect information about the brain. At UCLA, he started his seminal investigations into the two major lines of research that would define his career: X-ray shadow radiography and cerebral angiography. The first line was influential in the evolving concept of neuroimaging; the second yielded fundamental knowledge of brain metabolism and mechanisms of the blood–brain barrier.

== Contributions to medical science ==
=== Role in development of neuroimaging ===
In 1959, Oldendorf conceived an idea for "scanning a head through a transmitted beam of X-rays, and being able to reconstruct the radiodensity patterns of a plane through the head" by watching an engineer who was working on an automated apparatus to reject frostbitten fruit by detecting dehydrated portions. Not until 1961 did he complete a working prototype of his idea, apply (for $1700) for a patent on his idea, and publish an article detailing the work. Ingeniously, by using materials found in his home (such as his son's toy train, a phonograph turntable, and an alarm clock motor), Oldendorf demonstrated a method of producing cross-sectional images of soft tissue by back-projection and reconstruction. In his landmark paper, also published in 1961, he described the basic concept later used by Allan McLeod Cormack to develop the mathematics behind computerized tomography, though Prof. Cormack was unaware of Oldendorf's work. In October, 1963 Oldendorf finally received a U.S. patent for a "radiant energy apparatus for investigating selected areas of interior objects obscured by dense material,". This work was recognized by Godfrey Hounsfield as the only other attempt at tomographic reconstruction, and, indeed, formed the basis of much of his Nobel prize-winning work. The prototype developed by Dr. Oldendorf, however, did not lead to the development of the first industrial CAT scanning device. When suggested to a leading X-ray manufacturer of the time, the president of the company retorted,

Even if it could be made to work as you suggest, we cannot imagine a significant market for such an expensive apparatus which would do nothing but make a radiographic cross-section of a head.

Faced with this reaction, Oldendorf "turned his attention to other scientific work and heard nothing further about the idea until 1972."

However, his idea was a fundamental discovery which also led to MRI, positron emission tomography (PET), single photon emission computed tomography (SPECT), and other imaging techniques. Once these techniques became widely accepted, Dr. Oldendorf, along with William Markley McKinney, MD (1930–2003) were instrumental in promoting the use of Computed Tomography among neurologists to help decrease the use of superfluous and invasive tests.

=== Blood–brain barrier ===
Oldendorf made many other discoveries that have significantly affected neuroscience and the practice of medicine. He developed an original method to analyze blood flow in the brain and the kinetics of blood-brain permeability. The idea of the blood–brain barrier was already entrenched in medical science by this time, but had never been quantified. Oldendorf's work in measuring blood flow with radioactive isotopes was fundamental to the subsequent development of techniques now used in many nuclear medicine laboratories. His methods of assessing blood–brain barrier permeability increased knowledge of the mechanisms whereby drugs and metabolic substrates enter into the brain. Especially important was his characterization of more than a dozen independent carrier systems, along with their saturation kinetics.

Today, most of what is known of the selective permeability of the blood–brain barrier was either established by Oldendorf in his laboratory, or by others using his ingenious techniques. These results have been essential in developing PET and SPECT imaging; in studying glucose transport and brain metabolism; and in characterizing clinically important diseases such as cerebral ischemia, starvation, and epilepsy. Oldendorf's experiments were also the first to prove that cerebrospinal fluid functions as a "sink" in relationship to brain metabolism, a concept that is being investigated in relation to the pathophysiology of presenile dementias such as Alzheimer's disease.

=== Professional publications and societies ===
In his lifetime, Oldendorf wrote three textbooks and over 250 scientific articles, including The Quest for an Image of the Brain: Computerized Tomography in the Perspective of Past and Future Imaging Methods (Raven Press, New York, 1980) and Basics of Magnetic Resonance Imaging (Kluwer Academic Press, Boston, 1988). The book Basics of Magnetic Resonance Imaging is notable for being co-authored with his son and namesake, William Oldendorf, Jr.

Oldendorf was one of the 30 attendees of the Neurology Computed Tomography Symposium, organized by William Kinkel from September 24 to September 25, 1975, in Buffalo, New York. He participated in the ad hoc committee that unanimously voted to form the Society for Computerized Tomography so as to continue its educational activities. Realizing that other imaging modalities may eventually be prominent, the following year Oldendorf pushed to have the name of the society changed to Society for Computerized Tomography and Neuroimaging, and served as its president from 1978 to 1979. This society was to rename itself the American Society for Neuroimaging (ASN) in 1981, also with the prodding of Oldendorf.

Oldendorf was on several editorial boards and was a Fellow of the American Academy of Arts and Sciences. In 1992, he became the first neurologist ever to be elected to the National Academy of Sciences.

== Awards and prizes ==
In 1974, he shared the Ziedses des Plantes Gold Medal (given by the German Society of Neuroradiology and the Medical Physics Society of Wurzburgin) with Godfrey Hounsfield. Oldendorf was also awarded the Albert and Mary Lasker Award for Clinical Research in 1975 along with Prof. Hounsfield for "concepts and experiments which directly anticipated and demonstrated the feasibility of computerized tomography, which has revolutionized the field of neurological diagnosis". He received a Special Leadership Award from the American Academy of Neurology in 1980 for "contributions to clinical neurology, including computerized tomographic scanning, studies on the blood–brain barrier, and research on cerebral metabolism." In 1981 he received the President's Award for Distinguished Federal Civilian Service and the Medical Sciences Award from the UCLA Alumni Association.

Oldendorf was also

- Fellow of the Institute of Electrical and Electronics Engineers (1986),
- Distinguished Founder of the American Board of Nuclear Medicine Science,
- Honorary Doctorate of Science (1982) from Albany Medical College and Union College,
- Honorary Doctorate of Science (1986) from St. Louis University, and
- Keynote Speaker at the annual meeting of the Japanese Society of Neuroradiology in Tokyo in February, 1990

=== Nobel Prize controversy ===
Despite all his contributions to medical science, and despite the awards won in conjunction with the other eventual winners, Oldendorf was not awarded the Nobel Prize in Physiology or Medicine with his colleagues Godfrey Hounsfield and Allan Cormack in 1979. This was in concordance with the Nobel committee's tradition of denying the prize to researchers in applied research (who have M.D. degrees) in favor of researchers in the basic sciences (who have Ph.D. degrees). Rosalyn Yalow, a Nobel laureate herself, nominated Oldendorf for the prize and was reportedly upset that he did not get it. In the January 1980 issue of the journal Science (vol. 207, page 31), William J. Broad wrote an article titled "The Riddle of the Nobel Debate" in which he posited that politics in Stockholm forced the removal of Dr. Oldendorf's name during the nomination process. It was theorized that giving the prize to another American could sway pending patent litigation in Europe over the rights to the CT Scanner.

== Death and legacy ==
Despite the controversy over the Nobel Prize, Oldendorf was remarkably aplomb about the issue. He was supposed to have remarked

Naturally I'm disappointed; but I'll keep working and maybe one day I'll win a Nobel Prize for something else--if I live long enough.

He died unexpectedly on December 14, 1992 from the complications of heart disease. In his eulogy, L. Jolyon West (Chairman of Psychiatry at UCLA) stated,

Bill's mind was Einstein's universe, finite, but boundless. Always reaching into spheres you wouldn't imagine.

He was survived by his wife, Stella Oldendorf, three sons, and the implications of his work which are still being investigated.

In his honor, The Oldendorf Award is given annually by the American Society of Neuroimaging based on the submission of a manuscript that involves clinical research in computerized tomography, magnetic resonance imaging, SPECT or PET scanning.
