= Idwal Geoffrey Lloyd =

British administrator (1878–1946)

Sir Idwal Geoffrey Lloyd CSI
- Born: 13 January 1878
- Died: 6 March 1946 (aged 68)
- Education: Gonville and Caius College, Cambridge
- Occupation: Colonial administrator
- Children: 3, including Mary Drake

Sir Idwal Geoffrey Lloyd (13 January 1878 – 6 March 1946) was a British colonial administrator who served as Financial Commissioner and member of the Governor's Council in Burma during the 1930s.

== Early life and education ==
Lloyd was born on 13 January 1878, the son of John Lloyd of Cheshire. He was educated at King William's College, Isle of Man and Gonville and Caius College, Cambridge where in 1902 he was awarded the Bhavnagar Medal for prospective Indian Civil Service candidates studying at Cambridge University.

== Career ==
Lloyd joined the Indian Civil Service in 1902, and went to Burma where he served his entire career except from 1909 to 1910 when he was Assistant Commissioner and Under-Secretary to the Government of India. He served in a number of high offices including in 1916 when he was appointed Deputy Commissioner, promoted to Commissioner, Burma in 1927. From 1930 to 1935, he served as Financial Commissioner while also serving as temporary member of the Governor’s Council from 1930 to 1931 and in 1932. From 1935 to 1937, he served as permanent member of the Governor’s Council, representing the Finance and Revenue Departments. When India and Burma were separated in 1937, Lloyd retired and was knighted.

== Personal life and death ==
Lloyd married Georgette Helena Grant in 1910 and they had three daughters. Lloyd served with the rank of major in the Rangoon Battalion of the Indian Defence Force in Burma.

Lloyd died suddenly on 6 March 1946 at Fleet, Hampshire, aged 68.

== Honours ==
In the 1933 New Year Honours, Lloyd was appointed Companion of the Most Exalted Order of the Star of India (CSI). He was created a Knight Bachelor in the 1937 Coronation Honours.

== See also ==
- British rule in Burma
