= Molly Drake =

English poet and musician (1915–1993)

- Born: Mary Lloyd; 5 November 1915; Rangoon, Burma, British India
- Died: 4 June 1993 (aged 77); Tanworth-in-Arden, Warwickshire, England
- Occupations: Poet, musician
- Spouse: Rodney Drake (m. 1937; died 1988)
- Children: Gabrielle Drake; Nick Drake
- Website: brytermusic.com

Mary Drake (born Mary Lloyd; 5 November 1915 – 4 June 1993), also known as Molly Drake, was an English poet and musician. She is known as the mother of actress Gabrielle Drake and musician Nick Drake.

Molly Drake never released any official publications of her poetry or compositions in her lifetime, but she had a profound impact on the musical style of her son. As Nick Drake's music gained a larger following after his death, Molly Drake's recordings have been released, revealing similarities in music and lyrics between her work and her son's.

== Biography ==
Drake was born to father Sir Idwal Geoffrey Lloyd (13 January 1878, Cheadle Hulme, Cheshire – 6 March 1946, Surrey) and mother Georgie Lloyd, in Rangoon, Burma. She was christened "Mary", but no one used that as "Molly" was deemed more suitable. Both her parents were involved in the military, and the country was not considered the ideal place to raise Drake and her siblings, so the children were sent to England to be raised by the Dunn family, close associates of the Lloyds.

Drake and her siblings were placed in the Wycombe Abbey Boarding School where she struggled as a student, but managed to obtain her School Certificate. Once her studies were complete, Drake returned to Rangoon and soon met her future husband, Rodney Drake. The couple's marriage was postponed until Molly Drake reached the age of 21, as required by her parents. On 14 April 1937 they married in the cathedral at Rangoon.

In 1942, with World War II raging, Japan invaded Burma forcing Drake into refuge. She was separated from her husband, who enlisted for the Burma Campaign. Drake and her sister Nancy were evacuated to their uncle's home, which was in Delhi, India where the war hardly infringed on their lives. In order to find comfort, the sisters both sang and played the piano. They formed a duet, and Drake worked in her only musical career as a co-host on All India Radio. Molly and Nancy were known as The Lloyd Sisters while hosting the station. However, no known recordings of the sisters performing exist. Although Drake enjoyed singing and playing the piano for friends and on the radio, composing pieces was a private affair. She would only share her drafts with her immediate family.

Drake was reunited with her husband towards the end of the war, and she gave birth to her first child, Gabrielle Drake, on 30 March 1944. The family returned to Rangoon after the war and on 19 June 1948 their second child, Nick Drake, was born. In 1952, the family moved to Tanworth-in-Arden, England where Molly Drake spent the rest of her life and wrote most of her compositions. Her home was a place of social gathering where Drake would play the piano for friends, but, again, she never showed interest in publishing or recording her work.

Drake was supportive of her son's and daughter's career choices and encouraged Nick Drake's musical career. Nick Drake was closer to his mother than to his father. She often wrote songs to play for her children, one of Nick Drake's earliest influences. As her son suffered through depression, her poetry would reflect the turmoil she knew her son was going through, and the inability to help improve his condition. The toll of losing her son in 1974 took years to recover from, but through her family and composing, Drake was able to recover to live out the last part of her life. Drake died on 4 June 1993 and was buried in the Tanworth-in-Arden graveyard with her husband, who had died in 1988, and her son. On her tombstone it reads "Now we rise, and we are everywhere" as written by Nick Drake.

== Official releases ==
Molly Drake's material first met exposure on the documentary pertaining to her son's life, A Skin Too Few in 2000. The first official inclusion in an LP release was on the 2007 album, Family Tree. Two of her compositions, "Poor Mum" and "Do You Ever Remember?", were included on the release.

Nick Drake's increasing cult following led to further interest in his mother. In 2011, an album entitled Molly Drake was released with the intent of focusing solely on the work of Molly Drake. The nineteen songs were recorded on a rudimentary setup in the 1950s in seclusion at her home, engineered by her husband Rodney. Piano accompanies Drake's soft vocals on tracks that mainly last two minutes. The tracks are poetic and heavy-hearted, similar to her son's musical style. The album was first released on Bryter Music complete with a small book of poems in a black card portfolio. The album was first released in the USA by the Squirrel Thing Recordings label and was engineered by Nick Drake's past engineer, John Wood. Joe Boyd says this compilation is "the missing link in the Nick Drake story".

== Compilation albums ==
- Family Tree (2007)
- Molly Drake (2011)
- The Tide's Magnificence: Songs and Poems of Molly Drake (2017)

== In popular culture ==
The song "Little Weaver Bird" plays over the closing scene of the 2020 series Mrs. America.

The Songs and Poems of Molly Drake is a 2017 album by the English folk group, the Unthanks. The band has, as of October 2017, released two albums of their recordings of Drake's songs.

The song "I Remember" plays during the ending credits of "No Weddings and a Funeral", Season 2, Episode 10 (released on September 24, 2021) of Apple TV+’s series Ted Lasso. Also, it plays in another series by Apple TV+, "The Crowded Room", Season 1, Episode 9, "Family" (released on July 21, 2023). The song is also present in the critically acclaimed piece “Theatre of Dreams” by the critically acclaimed choreographer Hofesh Shechter.

The song "Happiness" was played in Resident Alien's Season 2, Episode 9.

Molly inspired Xan Tyler to write "Forever Things" which was released on 2024 in Glasgow.

== Cover versions ==
In 2013 Tracey Thorn recorded two Molly Drake tracks for a documentary, The Songs of Molly Drake, which was broadcast on BBC Radio 4.
