= Jesse Montgomery Mosher =

American physician

Jesse Montgomery Mosher, M.D. (1864–1922), an American physician, practiced psychiatry in Albany, New York and served as editor to medical journals. He was credited with establishing the first psychiatric ward within the organization of a general hospital.

Mosher was born in Albany, New York, the son of a physician. In 1876, he entered The Albany Academy. In 1882, he entered the Union College in New York and graduated in 1866. During his senior year, he served as an apothecary at the Utica State Hospital. He studied medicine at the Albany Medical College, receiving his M.D. in 1889. His thesis was "General Paralysis of the Insane." He visited the Willard State Hospital and the Willard Asylum for the Insane in New York in 1883 when he spent summer vacations in the area. After receiving his medical degree, he entered employment at Willard as a junior physician and then second assistant physician. When the then Superintendent of Willard transferred to the St. Lawrence State Hospital in 1890, Mosher followed him. He stayed for five years there as first assistant physician. He resigned because of political interference.

Preparing to enter medical practice in Albany, Mosher spent six months in Europe visiting medical and psychiatric clinics in Vienna, Berlin, London, and Edinburgh. On his return, the Albany Medical College and Hospital appointed him clinical professor of psychiatry and provided a clinic. The hospital, which had opened in 1849, opened new facilities in 1898, which included several connected buildings. With the support of local physicians, Mosher persuaded the hospital authorities to include a separate pavilion for psychiatric patients since the nearest state mental hospital was 75 miles away. The purpose of the ward was transient accommodation for insane patients committed to the state hospital, treatment of mild cases of insanity who may recover in general hospital, alcoholic and drug addicted patients, and patients in the course of treatment for medical and surgical illnesses who develop mental disorders. From 1902 to 1904, the ward admitted 331 patients: 24 transferred from other wards, 24 with acute delirium, 20% with melancholy or mania, 20% alcoholics, and others with dementia, uremia, and eclampsia. Recovered patients numbered 110: 96 improved while 25 died.

In 1908, Mosher was named Clinical Professor of Insanity, Nervous Disease and Electro-Therapeutics at the Albany Medical College, a position he held until his death in 1922. He became a joint editor of the Albany Medical Annals and held the position for 25 years until his death. For many years, he served on the editorial board of the American Journal of Insanity (later the American Journal of Psychiatry). He was a member of the American Neurological Association, and was affiliated with the Brady Memorial Hospital in Albany, the Albany Hospital for Incurables, and the Children's Hospital in Albany. He was active in civic organizations including the Albany Academy, the Albany Hospital, and the Advisory Selective Service Board for New York during World War I.

Mosher is credited with establishing the first psychiatric ward as part of a general hospital, a practice later adopted throughout the United States. By 1931, 122 of 420 general hospitals reported building special facilities for psychiatric patients.

He died of heart disease in December 1922.

== Works ==
- Mental Wards in General Hospitals. Albany, 1904.
- Scheme for the Differential Testing of Nerves and Muscles, for Use in Diagnosis. Albany, NY: Brandow Printing Co., 1903.
