= Harold Tempany =

British agricultural chemist (1881–1955)

Sir Harold Augustin Tempany
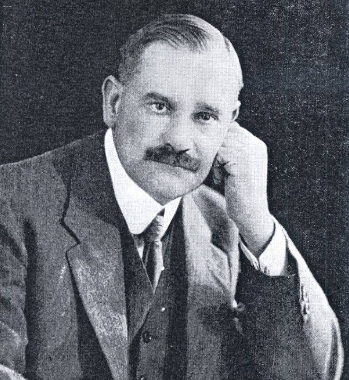
- Circa 1920
- Born: 23 July 1881
- Died: 2 July 1955 (aged 73)
- Education: University College, London
- Occupation: Agricultural chemist
- Years active: 1903-1955
- Honours: CBE CMG

Sir Harold Augustin Tempany CBE CMG (23 July 1881 – 2 July 1955) was a British agricultural chemist who served for forty-three years in the Colonial Agricultural Service.

== Early life and education ==
Tempany was born on 23 July 1881, son of Thomas Tempany and Emily Palmer. He was educated at the County School, Richmond, and University College, London where he received his DSc.

== Career ==
Tempany joined the Colonial agricultural service in the Leeward Islands in 1903 as an agricultural chemist and rose to the position of Superintendent of Agriculture in 1909.

He then went to Mauritius, serving as Director of Agriculture and Registrar Co-operative Credit Societies from 1917, was appointed a member of Mauritius Council of Government in the same year, and in 1924, was appointed principal of the Mauritius College of Agriculture, in addition to his other duties.

From 1929 to 1936, he served as Director of Agriculture of the Straits Settlements and Federated Malay States, and served as a Member of the Federal Council, Federated Malay States from 1934 to 1936.

In 1936, he returned to the Colonial Office as Agricultural Adviser to the Secretary of State for the Colonies, initially as assistant, remaining in the post until 1946.

Whilst working at the Colonial Office he also served on the Colonial Advisory Council on Agriculture (1937–1946) including as vice-chairman (1940–1943); was a member the Board of Governors of Imperial Institute (1942); was a member of Imperial Institute Council of Plant and Animal Products (1937) including as chairman (1940); was a member of the Governing Body of the Imperial College of Tropical Agriculture (1941–1946); served on the Chemical Council (1940–1943); the Council of the Royal Institute of Chemistry (1937–1940), including as vice-president (1940–1943); was chairman of the Commission of Enquiry for the Uganda Cotton Industry (1938); was Chairman of the Agriculture Group, and a member of the Council of the Chemical Industry Society (1950).

== Personal life and death ==
Tempany married Annie Goodwin in 1911, and after she died in 1945 he married Kate Welfare in 1946. Tempany died in London on 2 July 1955.

== Honours ==
Tempany was appointed Commander of the Order of the British Empire (CBE) in the 1933 New Year Honours, and was appointed Companion of the Order of St Michael and St George (CMG) in the 1941 Birthday Honours. He was appointed a Knight Bachelor in the 1946 New Year Honours.

He was awarded the King's Jubilee Medal in 1935, the Coronation Medal in 1937, and the silver medal, Royal Society of Arts in 1950.

== Publications ==
- Agriculture in the West Indies (1911).
- The campaign against phytalus smithi in the Colony of Mauritius (1920).
- The Practice of Soil Conservation in the Colonial Empire (1949).
- An Introduction to Tropical Agriculture (1958).
- Numerous technical and administrative papers and reports on Tropical Agriculture.
