= Alden March =

American physician

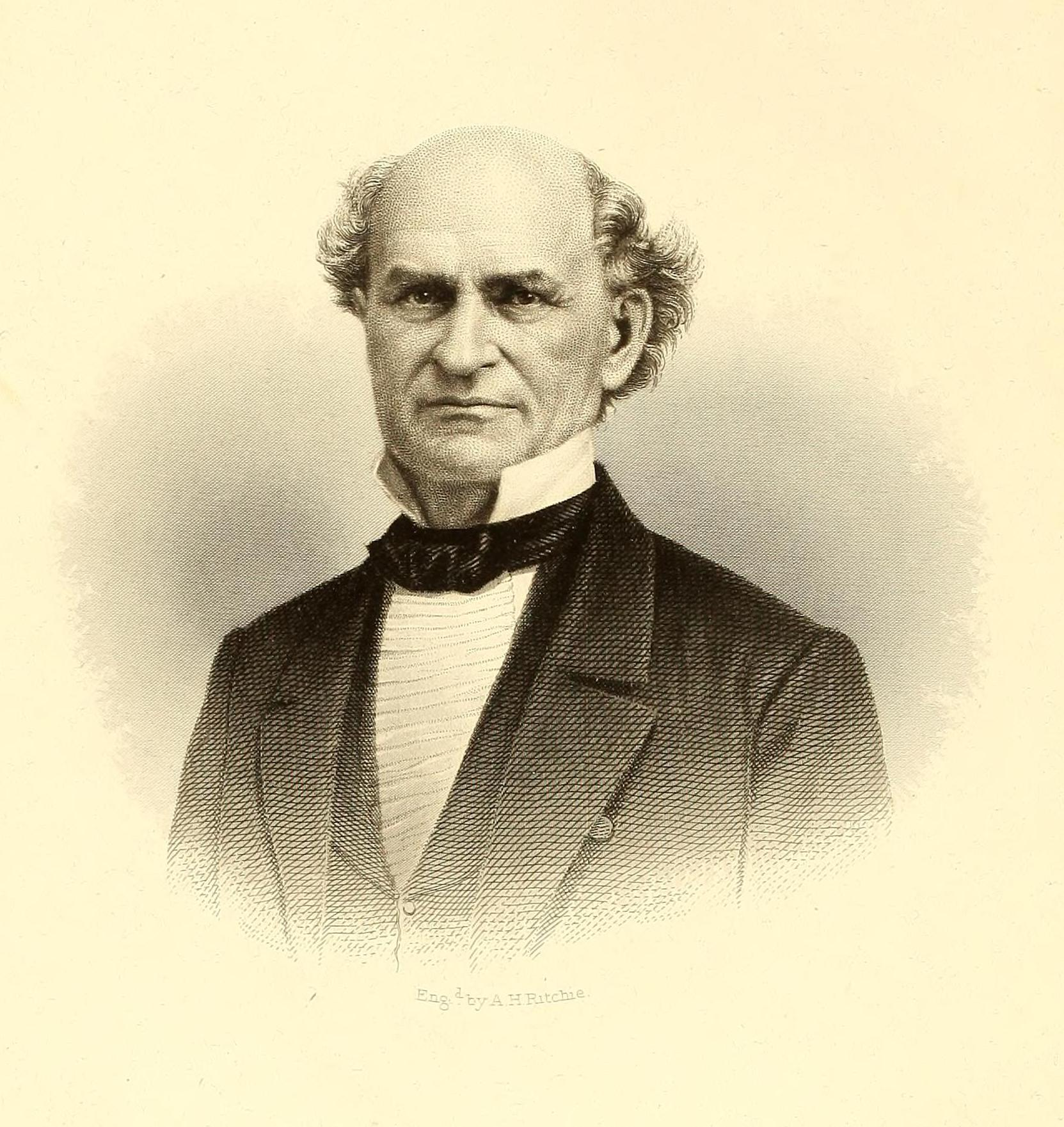
- Born: September 20, 1795; Sutton, Massachusetts
- Died: June 17, 1869 (aged 73); Albany, New York
- Education: Brown University School of Medicine
- Spouse: Joanna Perry Armsby (1824)

Alden March (1795–1869) was a nineteenth century American medical doctor, surgeon, educator and medical inventor. March is noted as a president of the American Medical Association and the co–founder of Albany Medical College.

== Early life ==
Alden March was born in Sutton, Massachusetts, on September 20, 1795, to Jacob March and Eleanor Moore. March studied locally until the age of 19; in 1817, he began working as a teacher in Upstate New York. At the suggestion of his brother, David March—an army surgeon, March returned to Massachusetts to study medicine.

Upon his return to Massachusetts, March studied under Dr. William Ingalls of Boston. In 1820 he received his MD from the Brown University School of Medicine.

March married Joanna P. Armsby on February 22, 1824

== Career ==
In 1821, March taught the first anatomy course in the history of New York State. He later founded the Practical School for Anatomy and Surgery in Albany, NY, now known as Albany Medical College, where he held the first chair in surgery.

Among the devices invented by March were novel methods for removing dead bone and renal calculi.

March served as president of the American Medical Association and the New York State Medical Society.

In 1868, William College conferred on March the degree of LLD.

== Legacy ==
March died on June 17, 1869, in Albany, New York.

The Alden March Bioethics Institute at Albany Medical College is named after March.
