= Molly Drake (album) =

Compilation album by Molly Drake
- Released: 5 March 2013
- Recorded: 1950s, Tanworth-in-Arden, Warwickshire, England
- Genre: English folk, parlour song
- Length: 37:21
- Label: Squirrel Thing Recordings
- Producer: Cally Callomon

Professional ratings
Review scores
Source	Rating
Allmusic	4/5 stars

Molly Drake is a compilation album of songs performed by the English poet and musician, Molly Drake. The recordings were made during the 1950s at the family home in Tanworth-in-Arden by her husband, Rodney Drake. A collection of these recordings and poems was released by Bryter Music as a limited privately pressed edition of 500 copies in 2011. It came as a single CD with a booklet of poetry housed in a black card portfolio. The album was later released by Squirrel Thing Records in March 2013. The recordings were originally made by her husband Rodney Drake on a home Ferrograph recorder, the released versions of which were engineered by John Wood and produced by Cally Callomon. John Wood was the sound engineer for her son Nick Drake's albums. The Squirrel Thing release of these recordings were officially licensed from Nick Drake's Estate: Bryter Music. The custom CD die cut sleeve and letterpress printing was produced by Middle Press in Brooklyn, NY.

== Reception ==
AllMusic awarded the album with 4 stars and its review by Fred Thomas states: "This collection of home-recorded songs by Molly Drake, mother of Nick and writer of her own private, secluded songs, offers another perspective on where Nick might have developed his songwriting voice. Recorded at home to a rudimentary tape setup during the 1950s, the 19 songs here feature solely Molly's soft but strong vocals and spare piano accompaniment. Her poetic lyrics are sometimes storytelling, sometimes nostalgic, and other times more vague, but even at their most lighthearted are touched by a sombre tone of despair."

== Track listing ==
All compositions by Molly Drake.

1. "Happiness" (1:49)
2. "Little Weaver Bird" (1:50)
3. "Cuckoo Time" (1:37)
4. "Love Isn’t a Right" (2:03)
5. "Dream Your Dreams" (1:54)
6. "How Wild The Wind Blows" (1:19)
7. "What Can A Song Do To You?" (2:29)
8. "I Remember" (3:04)
9. "A Sound" (1:54)
10. "Ballad" (1:56)
11. "Woods in May" (1:10)
12. "Night Is My Friend" (1:39)
13. "Fine Summer Morning" (1:20)
14. "Set Me Free" (1:29)
15. "Breakfast at Bradenham Woods" (1:50)
16. "Never Pine for the Old Love" (4:00)
17. "Poor Mum" (1:41)
18. "Do You Ever Remember?" (1:38)
19. "The First Day" (2:39)

== Personnel ==
- Molly Drake – piano, vocals
