= Edith Charlotte Onians =

(1866–1955) voluntary welfare worker

Edith Charlotte Onians OBE
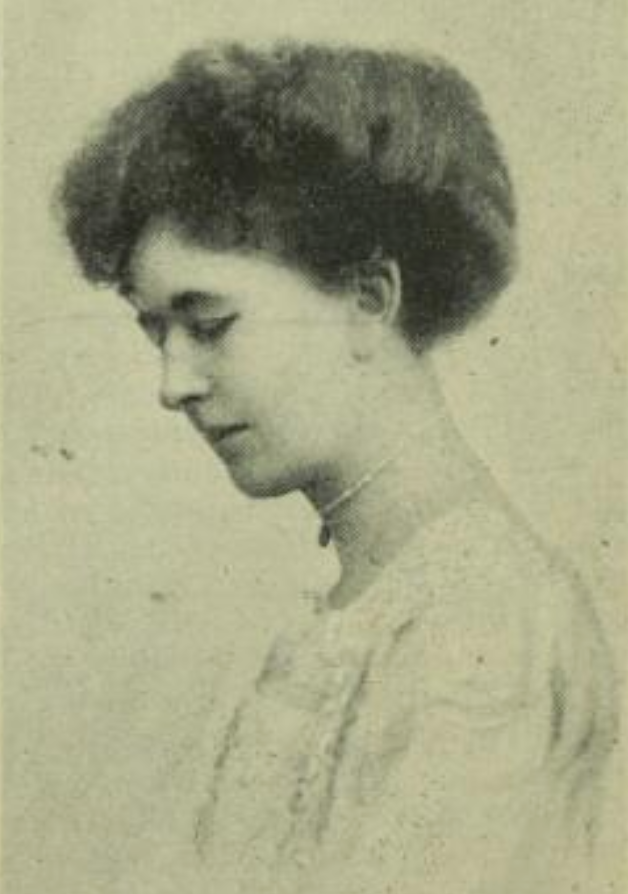
- Born: 2 February 1866; Lancefield, Victoria, Australia
- Died: 16 August 1955 (aged 89); Heidelberg, Victoria, Australia
- Education: Fontainebleau Ladies' College, St Kilda, Victoria, Australia
- Occupation: Social reformer

Edith Charlotte Onians OBE (2 February 1866 – 16 August 1955) was an Australian social reformer and voluntary welfare worker concerned with the welfare of newsboys in Melbourne.

== Life ==
Onians was born in 1866 in Lancefield. Her parents Charlotte (born Smith) and Richard Onians were both English immigrants. Her father sold grain and he was an auctioneer. Charlotte did not need to work.

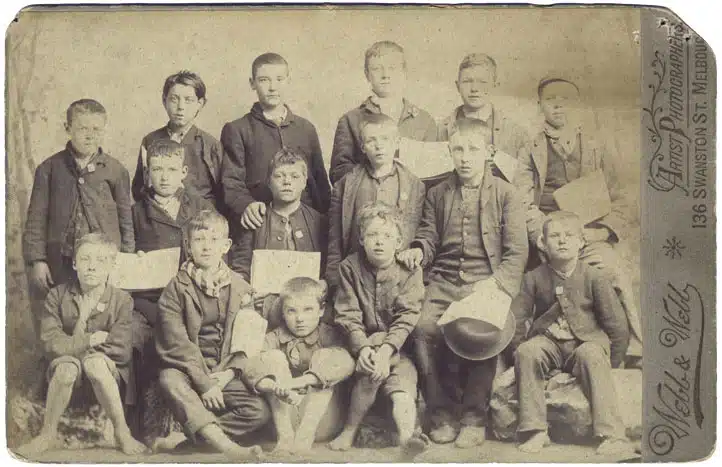
These are Edith Onian's first fifteen Boys of 1897

The City Newsboys Try Society was started in 1895 by William Mark Forster and it was based in a store room at the Cyclorama Building in Melbourne at 192 Little Collins Street. Onians became involved in 1897 and she gathered her fifteen newsboys. She was known as the "Mother of the Newsboys" and she described the boys as rough and they were poor. Australians would have called them "Larrikins". She offered to give classes to the boys and these were accepted. She taught them reading, writing and arithmetic and on Sundays, as a good Anglican, she gave them lessons in scripture. The organisation moved in 1903 to Coromandel Place and in 1907 there was 700 members. In 1923, they moved back to Little Collins Street. This time it was in custom built two storey building. Onians served as the organiser and secretary for over 55 years. Onians donated the records of the Melbourne Newsboys' Club Foundation to the State Library of Victoria.

In 1928, the Street Trading Act came into force and it introduced licensing for street traders. This was due in part due to campaigning by Onians. Boys under twelve were not allowed to trade on the street. The board created by the act was made up of all men, except for Onians.

She was appointed an Officer of the British Empire in the 1933 New Year Honours for her child welfare work in Victoria.

Onians died in 1955, aged 89, in a hospital in Heidelberg, Victoria. Her obituary said that she would be missed by a government minister, the heads of two government departments and 20,000 others who had passed through her organisation.
