= Thomas Hale Jr. =

American Christian missionary, physician and author (born 1937)

Dr. Thomas Hale Jr. (born October 10, 1937) is an American physician and author who is best known for his 25 years of missionary work in the Himalayan Mountains of Nepal. Self-described as "deeply Christian", Hale was driven to become a missionary due to his strong faith and devotion to God. Shortly after returning from his first trip, Hale began writing books, some of which have received critical acclaim, about Christianity and life as a missionary. After his permanent settlement back in the United States, he served as a board member for both the International Nepal Fellowship (INF) North America and the MedSend organization.

== Early life and family ==
Hale was born in New Haven, Connecticut. He grew up in Slingerlands, a suburb of Albany, New York, with aspirations of becoming a politician. As an adolescent, he attended the Phillips Academy boarding school in Andover, Massachusetts, where he experienced a spiritual epiphany that led him to believe God wanted him to become a medical missionary. In his search to find his missionary home, Hale stumbled upon a pamphlet that described the ongoing medical need in Nepal. After reading this brochure, he chose Nepal as his future missionary destination. Hale attended Arizona State University.

Hale's father, Dr. Thomas Hale Sr., was a hospital administrator. Thomas Hale Jr. met his wife, Dr. Cynthia Hale, during their first year attending Albany Medical College. They bonded over their shared commitment to Jesus Christ and missionary service. The couple married in 1959 and had two sons, Thomas III and Christopher. Thomas and Cynthia Hale received their respective medical degrees in June 1962.

== Career ==
After graduating from Albany Medical College, Hale was trained in general surgery. Cynthia Hale became a pediatrician. Thomas Hale served as a major in the U.S. Army Medical Corps; the family was stationed at Sandia Base in New Mexico. While there, the Hales were assigned by the United Mission to Nepal to a rural hospital. Hale collected surgical supplies in the form of donations from his hospital and the Brooke Army Medical Center.

=== Missionary work ===
Hale moved to Nepal with Cynthia and their sons Tommy (age four) and Christopher (age 1). The family brought with them sufficient food and supplies for four years. The family arrived in the capital city of Kathmandu in August 1970. In Nepal, Hale was assigned to work in a small, newly constructed hospital in Amppipal, a tiny village in the Himalayas in Gorkha District. The Amppipal Mission Hospital was built in 1969 by the United Mission to Nepal (UNM), the missionary organization that was responsible for placing the Hales.

The Amppipal Hospital provided medical services for an area approximately the size of Rhode Island, that included about half a million people. Throughout his years at the hospital, Hale acted as the head surgeon, while treating other general injuries and common diseases that faced the Nepalese people. After several years, Hale was appointed medical director of the Amppipal Hospital.

In 1996, Thomas and Cynthia returned to the United States. Following their return, Thomas Hale served as the president of the North America Board of the International Nepal Fellowship and as a board of reference member for the MedSend organization. With these two organizations, as well as their sending mission, Interserve USA, the Doctors Hale worked together to provide opportunities for medical professionals to travel to other countries to contribute medical services, and they coauthored a study guide on medical missions for the Christian Medical & Dental Society.

== Published works ==
Hale is also known for his published works:

- Don't Let the Goats Eat the Loquat Trees (1986), a chronicle of his first years as a missionary in Nepal and the cultural issues he faced while living in a primarily Hindu country.
- On the Far Side of Liglig Mountain (1993)
- Living Stones of the Himalayas
- On Being a Missionary (1995), which details the challenges faced when working as a medical missionary. In the book, Hale discusses the positive and negative outcomes associated with missionary work and uses his personal experience to address the best ways to cope with them. He specifically writes about the preparations it takes to become a missionary and how to endure the culture shock, social barriers and emotional stress that can accompany living in a foreign world.
- A Light Shines in Central Asia (2000)
- Light Dawns in Nepal (2012)
- On Being a Missionary Revised Edition, with Gene Daniels (2012)

In 1993, Hale wrote Nayaa Karaarko Tippani in the Nepalese language. The book is a commentary on the New Testament, with general articles contributed by Dr. Stephen Thorson. The two doctors then re-wrote the commentary in English under the title The Applied New Testament Commentary (1996) and it has been translated into more than 30 different languages, including Amharic, Malagasy, Marathi, Serbian, Sinhalese and Yoruba.

Hale and Thorson also wrote The Applied Old Testament Commentary in English (2007).
