= Rene Juchli =

US Army medical officer for the Nuremberg trials

Lt. Col Rene Juchli
- Born: Rene Hardy Juchli; 25 September 1889; Zurich, Switzerland
- Died: 2 November 1965 (aged 76); Amsterdam, New York, USA
- Burial place: Fairview Cemetery, Amsterdam, NY
- Alma mater: Albany Medical College (MD)
- Spouse: Eva M. Shobee (m. 1923–1965)
- Military career
- Allegiance: United States
- Branch: US Army Medical Corps
- Rank: Lieutenant Colonel
- Known for: discovered that Rudolf Hess was faking amnesia
- Awards: Legion of Merit

Rene Juchli (September 25, 1889 - November 2, 1965) was a medical doctor and American soldier who was the Medical Chief for the Nuremberg war crime trials held in Germany after World War II. During the trials, Nazi Party leader Rudolf Hess claimed to be suffering from amnesia. Juchli refuted Hess' claim, stating that he suffered from intentional amnesia. Hess later recanted his claim.

== Early life ==
Juchli was born in Zurich, Switzerland on September 25, 1889, the oldest of five children to Reinhard Juchli and Anna Elizebth Stilli. He attended grammar and secondary schools in Zurich. He served as a lay preacher for a year then he went to Frankfurt, Germany where he attended the Methodist Theological Seminary, graduating with a Bachelor of Divinity degree. He served in Germany for a year as assistant pastor of nine country congregations of the Methodist Church. On September 11, 1913, he emigrated to the United States and became assistant pastor of the German Methodist Church of Brooklyn, NY where he served for one year then he became pastor of the German Methodist Church of Amsterdam, New York. Next, he we went to Berea, Ohio to study science at Baldwin Wallace College, graduating in three years with a Bachelor of Science degree in medicine. In 1931 he earned his M.D. from Albany Medical College.

== Military and medical career ==
Juchli enlisted in the Army in 1917 and served at the Army Medical School in Washington, D.C. and in North Carolina, where he was promoted to sergeant. After the war, he worked for a brief time as a principal and superintendent of schools at Hitchcock and Capron, Oklahoma. He returned to Amsterdam, NY where he was employed as an X-ray and clinical specialist for Dr. Lew Finch. After graduating from medical school he returned to the Army and was commissioned a first lieutenant at the Medical Field Service School in Carlisle, PA. Returning to Amsterdam in June 1932, he practiced family medicine until Pearl Harbor when he returned to the military as a captain. He served as a radiologist in New York City and St. John's Newfoundland until 1943, when he was promoted to major and transferred to the office of the Surgeon General, Washington D.C., to serve as chief liaison officer of the Provost Marshal General. He was responsible for the health of prisoners of war held in the continental US.

=== Nuremberg trials ===
Juchli was promoted to lieutenant colonel and appointed as chief of medical staffs at the International Military Tribunal in Nuremberg, Germany. He was responsible for the medical care of Hitler's most famous Nazi leaders who were on trial for plotting and carrying out invasions of other countries across Europe and committing atrocities against their citizens in World War II. Juchli was fluent in German and was able to personally examine the famous Nazi prisoners who were on trial; Robert Ley, Hermann Göring, Hitler's Deputy Fuhrer Rudolf Hess, Joachim von Ribbentrop, grand admiral Karl Dönitz, Ernst Kaltenbrunner, field marshal Wilhelm Keitel, Baldur von Schirach, Alfred Rosenberg, Hans Frank, Julius Streicher, generaloberst Alfred Jodl, and Franz von Papen. Juchli found Göring good-humored and he had to constantly remind himself of the atrocities that he had committed in order to keep himself from liking him. Göring was found guilty and sentenced to death. He committed suicide with a potassium cyanide capsule the night before he was scheduled to be hanged. Hess claimed complete amnesia. French and English psychiatrists had confirmed Hess' claim of amnesia. Juchli refuted this saying, "The case is strange as Hess does not remember his flight to Britain but, in his next statement, complains that we (the Americans) are not treating him as well as the British did". When he was questioned as to why he disagreed Juchli said, "I have the advantage of knowing the language, and having common sense. Besides, I searched his cell and found his well hidden diary." Hess eventually admitted faking amnesia. Hess was found guilty and sentenced to life in prison. He committed suicide by hanging himself in Spandau Prison in 1987.

== Later life ==
After his retirement from the Army, Juchli was assigned to the Honorary Reserve. He returned to his medical practice in Amsterdam, NY. He was a member of the Society of Military Surgeons, a charter member of the New York Academy of Medicine, a member and former secretary and president of the Medical Society of the County of Montgonery. He was also a member of Phi Sigma Kappa and an honorary member of Theta Kappa Psi, medical fraternities. He retired in 1956. He subsequently served on his local draft board for the Selective Service System.

== Awards and recognitions ==
- Legion of Merit
- Citation from President Lyndon Johnson for his service to the local draft board.

== Personal life ==
Juchli became a naturalized United States citizen in 1918. On May 12, 1923, Juchli married 21 year old Eva Shobe in Alva, Oklahoma. They had no children. He was known to his friends and family as Hardy. He died on November 2, 1965, in Amsterdam, NY and is buried in Fairview Cemetery, Amsterdam, NY.
