= John Scott (English cricketer) =

English cricketer

John Gordon Cameron Scott (14 March 1888 – 21 March 1946) was an English cricketer active from 1907 to 1918 who played for Sussex and during the First World War in India. He was born in Eastbourne and died in Southampton. He appeared in thirteen first-class matches as a righthanded batsman who scored 347 runs with a highest score of 137.
