= San C. Po =

Sir San Crombie Po, CBE (4 October 1870 – 7 June 1946) was a Karen nationalist who devoted himself to improving the situation of the Karen people of Burma in the early 20th century.

He was born in 1870 near the village of Bassein. His family was Sgaw Karen and Christian. He attended a school headed by an American missionary, Charles Nichols, who was impressed with his motivation and decided Po should continue his education in the United States. At the age of fourteen, he was sent to live with relatives of Dr. Nichols. After high school, he attended Albany Medical College and received his MD degree in 1893. He applied for naturalization as a U.S. citizen but was denied on the grounds of his race.

He returned to Burma and served as the district medical officer in Bassein, followed by Kyaukse and Myaungmya. He increasingly became involved in Karen nationalist affairs and in 1915 was appointed to the Legislative Council of Burma, an advisory council to the British colonial governor.

He was appointed a CBE and was further knighted in 1933.

He is also known for his book Burma and the Karens. Published in 1928, Burma and the Karens now functions as a survey on the situation facing the Karen people in the early 20th century.
