= Albany Medical College =

Private medical school in Albany, New York, US

- Type: Private medical school
- Established: 1839; 187 years ago
- Affiliations: Union University
- Students: 566
- Location: Albany, New York, United States
- Campus: Urban and Suburban
- Website: amc.edu

Albany Medical College (AMC) is a private medical school in Albany, New York. It was founded in 1839 by Alden March and James H. Armsby and is one of the oldest medical schools in the nation. A component of Union University, the college is part of the Albany Medical Center, which includes the Albany Medical Center Hospital.

Over its 170-year history, Albany Medical College has attracted and produced many leaders in medicine and research. Among its present and past faculty, researchers, and alumni there are two Nobel Prize winners, two Lasker Award winners, two MacArthur Fellowship recipients, one Gairdner Foundation International Award winner, former Surgeon General of the United States Army, former Surgeon General of the United States Air Force, several presidents and CEOs of major academic hospitals, as well as an early president and co-founder of the American Medical Association. AMC is attributed as the site where David S. Sheridan perfected the modern-day disposable catheter, among other major discoveries and innovations. Among AMC alumni accomplishments include the discovery of the hormone leptin, the invention of computed tomography, and the discovery of oral rehydration therapy.

== Academics ==
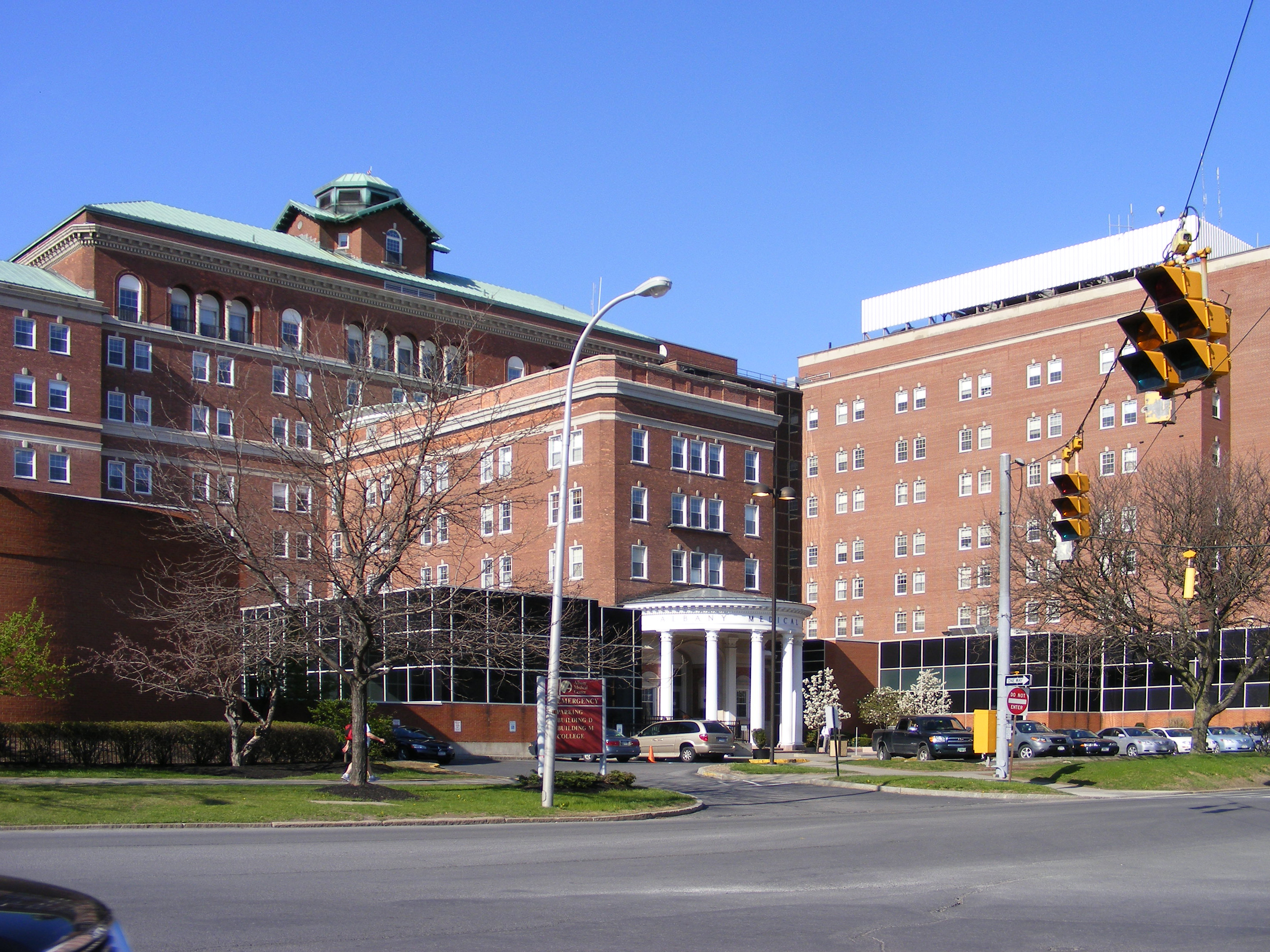
Albany Medical Center Hospital, a 734-bed Level-I Trauma Center contiguous with the medical college

There are multiple courses of study at the college with tracks that end in an MD degree, as well as a Graduate Studies program with the following departments:

- Center for Physician Assistant Studies
- Center for Nurse Anesthesia
- Alden March Bioethics Institute
- Center for Cardiovascular Sciences
- Center for Cell Biology and Cancer Research
- Center for Immunology and Microbial Disease
- Center for Neuropharmacology and Neuroscience

In addition to the traditional medical school application process, AMC reserves up to 50 places in its first-year class for participants in combined-degree programs. Students from Rensselaer Polytechnic Institute, Union College and Siena College complete certain undergraduate requirements prior to matriculation at Albany Medical College, then finish their undergraduate degrees at AMC while concurrently earning their MDs. Programs range from a total of seven to eight years.

The AMC Physician Assistant Program was established in 1972, in collaboration with Hudson Valley Community College. Its graduates received from HVCC the A.A.S. in Physician Assistant Studies, and a certificate of completion from AMC. Since 2005, the program has granted a Master of Science in PA studies. The program's curriculum consists of a variety of courses in basic and medical science within four didactic terms and an additional twelve months of medical rotations.

== Alden March Bioethics Institute ==
The Alden March Bioethics Institute (AMBI) is a multi-institutional bioethics research organization based at the Albany Medical College in New York. 26 faculty originate first-rate scholarship with the support of more than $3 million in federal and foundation grants. The Institute until recently housed The American Journal of Bioethics (AJOB) and bioethics.net. Its faculty direct a number of graduate programs including those offering the M.S. and Doctor of Professional Studies (D.P.S.) in Bioethics. The Institute is named in honor of Alden March, a 19th-century physician.

== WAMC public radio ==
In October 1958, the college, alongside the medical center, started a public radio station, WAMC. The callsign comes from both the college and medical center. In 1980, citing financial burdens, the station was spun off to an independent entity, WAMC, Inc. WAMC is now the primary NPR station for the Albany area.

== Notable alumni and faculty ==
- Jacob M. Appel, bioethicist, is a graduate of AMC's Alden March Bioethics Institute.
- Sir James W. Black, Visiting Professor, a Scottish doctor and pharmacologist who invented Propranolol, synthesized Cimetidine and was awarded the Nobel Prize for Medicine in 1988 for these discoveries.
- Samuel Baldwin Ward, M.D., Ph.D., Dean of AMC 1905–1914.
- Betty Q. Banker, pediatric neuropathologist and medical researcher
- Kenneth Blackfan, well-known pediatric hematologist and mentor of Louis K. Diamond and Sidney Farber, proclaimed "father" of modern-day chemotherapy. Diamond-Blackfan Syndrome is named after him. Children's Hospital Boston is located on Blackfan Street, which is named after Blackfan.
- Edward Bove, well known for his contributions to the repair of congenital heart defects, most notably hypoplastic left heart syndrome.
- Steven J. Burakoff, cancer specialist and the author of both Therapeutic Immunology (2001) and Graft-Vs.-Host Disease: Immunology, Pathophysiology, and Treatment (1990)
- Charles S. Butler, physician and a member of the New York State Assembly
- Levi Ruggles Church, Canadian jurist.
- Chester Bidwell Darrall, Union Army Surgeon and Republican Congressman from Louisiana in the latter 19th Century.
- Thomas C. Durant, Vice President of the Union Pacific Railroad and creator of the financial structure which led to the Crédit Mobilier scandal
- Walter Millard Fleming, MD, founder of the Ancient Arabic Order Nobles of the Mystic Shrine in 1872.
- Jeffrey M. Friedman, MD, PhD a molecular geneticist at New York City's Rockefeller University. His discovery of the hormone leptin and its role in regulating body weight has had a major role in the area of human obesity. For these achievements, he received the prestigious Gairdner Foundation International Award.
- Nancy E. Gary, former dean of Albany Medical College. Executive Vice President of the Uniformed Services University of the Health Sciences and Dean of its F. Edward Hébert School of Medicine, 1992–1995.
- Ivar Giaever, 1973 Nobel Prize in Physics Recipient, performed antibody-antigen experiments at The Albany Medical Center.
- Gary Gottlieb, current president of Brigham and Women's Hospital and succeeding CEO of Partners HealthCare.
- Thomas Hale, Jr, American medical missionary and author.
- Ferdinand Vandeveer Hayden, noted for his pioneering surveying expeditions of the Rocky Mountains in the late 19th century.
- Timothy Johnson (TV medical presenter), Emmy award winning television personality, author and physician who, as "Dr. Tim Johnson", is best known to TV viewers in his capacity as the longtime chief medical correspondent for ABC News.
- Rene Juchli, US Army medical officer for the Nuremberg trials
- Edward Khantzian, co-originator of the self-medication hypothesis of drug abuse.
- Matthew N. Levy, physiologist and textbook author.
- Alden March, founder of Albany Medical College, co-founder and past president of the American Medical Association.
- Jesse Montgomery Mosher, psychiatrist, established first psychiatric ward in a medical hospital.
- David Nalin, discoverer of oral rehydration therapy, which is accredited with saving an estimated 50 million lives from diarrhea across the world. Both The Lancet and UNICEF cited ORT as one of the most important medical advances in the 20th century.
- William H. Oldendorf, an American neurologist, physician, researcher, medical pioneer, founding member of the American Society for Neuroimaging (ASN), and originator of the technique of computed tomography. Winner of the Lasker Award, his fundamental discovery also led to MRI, positron emission tomography (PET), single photon emission computed tomography (SPECT), and other imaging techniques. Originally nominated for the 1979 Nobel Prize for Physiology or Medicine with his colleagues, his name was eventually withdrawn for political reasons.
- Henry Palmer, Union Army Surgeon.
- Sir San Crombie Po, a Karen nationalist who devoted himself to improving the situation of the Karen people of Burma in the early 20th century.
- Tabor B. Reynolds, an American physician who served as town supervisor, New York State Assemblyman, and Sheriff of Saratoga County.
- James Salisbury, M.D. physician, and the inventor of the Salisbury steak.
- John A. Sampson, a gynecologist who advanced the study of endometriosis. The Sampson artery is named after him.
- Richard Selzer, MD, widely published short-story writer and novelist, Guggenheim Fellowship recipient, and surgeon at Yale University School of Medicine.
- Theobald Smith, pioneering microbiologist and the first person to prove that diseases can be transmitted through insects. He is widely considered to be America's first internationally significant medical research scientist.
- Sally Temple, Ph.D., Professor, MacArthur Fellow and Director of the New York Stem Cell Institute.
- Jef Valkeniers, Belgian doctor and politician.
- Willis R. Whitney, an American chemist and founder of the research laboratory of the General Electric Company.
