= Robert Burnell Skinner =

The Honourable Robert Burnell Skinner MBE
- Born: 24 November 1893; Roseau, Dominica
- Died: 26 January 1969 (aged 75); Port of Spain, Trinidad and Tobago

The Hon. Robert Burnell Skinner MBE (24 November 1893 – 26 January 1969), also known as R. B. Skinner, was variously Accountant General of Trinidad and Tobago, Chairman of the Agricultural Credit Bank of Trinidad and Tobago, Treasurer and Collector of Customs in Antigua and Federal Treasurer of the Leeward Islands for which he was made a Member of the Order of the British Empire in 1933. He also served as a member of the Executive and Legislative Councils of Montserrat, Antigua, Dominica and Trinidad and Tobago.

== Life ==
Robert Burnell Skinner was born in Roseau, Dominica, on 24 November 1893. He was the son of William Skinner, originally of Bedford, and Maria (née Gridley). Skinner was educated in England at Bedford Modern School.

Skinner joined the Colonial Service, holding various minor appointments in the Leeward Islands between 1910 and 1920. He was appointed Chief Clerk to the Administrator of St Kitts and Nevis in November 1920 and Chief Clerk to the Administrator of Dominica in November 1924. In May 1926, Skinner was appointed Secretary of the Loan Board and later made a member of the Roseau Town Board in April 1927 before taking up an appointment as Commissioner of Income Tax in Dominica in May 1927.

Skinner served as Private Secretary to Sir Eustace Fiennes between November 1927 and June 1929 before moving to the Agricultural Treasury in Dominica where he also served as an official member of the Executive and Legislative Council. He worked in the Office of the Attorney General in Montserrat from February 1930 where he was also a member of the Executive and Legislative Councils.

In 1931 he was made Treasurer of Antigua and later Federal Treasurer of the Leeward Islands and was also an official member of the Federal Executive Council and General Legal Council. For these roles he was made a Member of the Order of the British Empire in 1933.

By 1946, Skinner was in Trinidad and Tobago where he was Accountant General, Chairman of the Agricultural Credit Bank of Trinidad and Tobago and, for a time, Assistant Financial Secretary. He was a member of the Trinidad and Tobago legislative council. He retired in 1948.

Skinner died in Port of Spain on 26 January 1969 and was survived by a wife, Mildred Isabella (née Rochford), and three of their four children.
